= Judaism by country =

These articles deal with the practice of Judaism and the life and history of Jews in the listed countries.

Country	Jewish populations	Jewish history	Lists of Jews
Afghanistan	Afghan Jews, Bukharan Jews	Afghanistan	Asian
Albania		Albania	South-East European
Algeria	Sephardi Jews and Mizrahi Jews	Algeria	Arab World
Andorra		Andorra	South European and Iberian
Angola		Angola	Sub-Saharan African
Antigua and Barbuda		Antigua and Barbuda	Caribbean
Argentina	Argentine Jews (mainly Ashkenazi and Sephardi Jews)	Argentina	Latin American; Argentine
Armenia		Armenia	Asian and East European
Aruba		Aruba	Caribbean
Australia	Australian Jews (mainly Ashkenazi Jews)	Australia	Oceanian
Austria		Austria	West European; Austrian
Azerbaijan	Mountain Jews and Azerbaijani Jews	Azerbaijan	Asian and East European
Bahamas		Bahamas	Caribbean
Bahrain		Bahrain and exodus	Arab World
Bangladesh		Bangladesh	Asian
Barbados		Barbados	Caribbean
Belarus		Belarus	East European; Belarusian
Belgium	Jews in Antwerp	Belgium	West European
Belize		Belize	Caribbean
Benin		Benin	Sub-Saharan African
Bermuda		Bermuda	Caribbean
Bhutan		Bhutan	Asian
Bolivia		Bolivia	Latin American
Bosnia and Herzegovina		Bosnia and Herzegovina	South-East European
Botswana		Botswana	Sub-Saharan African
Brazil	Brazilian Jews (mainly Ashkenazi and Sephardi Jews)	Brazil	Latin American
British Virgin Islands		British Virgin Islands	Caribbean
Brunei		Brunei	Asian
Bulgaria		Bulgaria	South-East European
Burkina Faso		Burkina Faso	Sub-Saharan African
Burundi		Burundi	Sub-Saharan African
Cambodia		Cambodia	Asian
Cameroon		Cameroon	Sub-Saharan African
Canada		Canada	Canadian
Cape Verde	Jews of Bilad el-Sudan	Cape Verde	Sub-Saharan African
Central African Republic		Central African Republic	Sub-Saharan African
Chad		Chad	Sub-Saharan African
Chile		Chile	Latin American; Chilean
China	Kaifeng Jews	China	Asian
Colombia		Colombia	Latin American
Comoros		Comoros	Sub-Saharan African
Democratic Republic of the Congo		Democratic Republic of the Congo	Sub-Saharan African
Republic of the Congo		Republic of the Congo	Sub-Saharan African
Costa Rica		Costa Rica	Latin American
Croatia		Croatia	South-East European
Cuba		Cuba	Latin American and Caribbean
Curaçao		Curaçao	Caribbean
Cyprus		Cyprus	South-East European
Czechia		Czechia and Carpathian Ruthenia	East European; Czech
Denmark		Denmark	North European
Djibouti		Djibouti	Sub-Saharan African
Dominica		Dominica	Caribbean
Dominican Republic		Dominican Republic	Latin American and Caribbean
Ecuador		Ecuador	Latin American
Egypt		Egypt and exodus	Arab World
El Salvador		El Salvador	Latin American
Equatorial Guinea		Equatorial Guinea	Sub-Saharan African
Eritrea		Eritrea	Sub-Saharan African
Estonia		Estonia	North European
Eswatini		Eswatini	Sub-Saharan African
Ethiopia	Beta Israel; Qemant people	Ethiopia	Sub-Saharan African
Faroe Islands		Faroe Islands	North European
Fiji		Fiji	Oceanian
Finland		Finland	North European
France		France	West European; French
French Guiana		French Guiana	Caribbean
French Polynesia		French Polynesia	Oceanian
Gabon		Gabon	Sub-Saharan African
Gambia		Gambia	Sub-Saharan African
Georgia	Georgian Jews	Georgia	Asian and East European
Germany	Ashkenazi Jews	Germany	West European; German
Ghana	House of Israel (Ghana)	Ghana	Sub-Saharan African
Gibraltar	Sephardi Jews	Gibraltar	South European and Iberian
Greece	Sephardi Jews, Romaniotes	Greece	South-East European
Greenland		Greenland	North European
Grenada		Grenada	Caribbean
Guatemala		Guatemala	Latin American
Guinea		Guinea	Sub-Saharan African
Guinea-Bissau		Guinea-Bissau	Sub-Saharan African
Guyana		Guyana	Caribbean
Haiti		Haiti	Caribbean
Honduras		Honduras	Latin American
Hong Kong	Iraqi Jews (Sephardi/Baghdadi Jews), Israeli, Jewish American	Hong Kong	Asian
Hungary	Oberlander Jews, Satmar Hasidic dynasty, and Neolog	Hungary and Carpathian Ruthenia	East European; Hungarian
Iceland		Iceland	North European
India	Bene Israel and Cochin, Indian, Baghdadi and Bnei Menashe	India	Asian
Indonesia		Indonesia	Asian
Iran	Persian, Mizrahi, and Kurdish	Iran	Asian
Iraq	Mizrahi Jews, Baghdadi Jews, and Kurdish Jews	Iraq and exodus	Arab World
Ireland		Ireland	West European
Israel	Israeli Jews	Israel	Israeli
Italy	Italian Jews, Jewish Community of Trieste	Italy	South European
Ivory Coast		Ivory Coast	Sub-Saharan African
Jamaica		Jamaica	Caribbean
Japan		Japan	Asian
Jordan		Jordan	Arab World
Kazakhstan	Kazakh Jews	Kazakhstan	Asian
Kenya	Kehillat Israel Kenya	Kenya	Sub-Saharan African
Kiribati		Kiribati	Oceanian
North Korea		North Korea and Radhanites	Asian
South Korea		South Korea and Radhanites	Asian
Kosovo		Kosovo	South-East European
Kuwait		Kuwait	Arab World
Kyrgyzstan	Bukharan Jews	Kyrgyzstan	Asian
Laos		Laos	Asian
Latvia		Latvia	North European
Lebanon	Mizrahi Jews	Lebanon and exodus	Arab World
Lesotho		Lesotho	Sub-Saharan African
Liberia		Liberia	Sub-Saharan African
Libya		Libya and exodus	Arab World
Liechtenstein		Liechtenstein	West European
Lithuania	Lithuanian Jews	Lithuania	North European
Luxembourg		Luxembourg	West European
Macau		Macau	Asian
Madagascar		Madagascar	Sub-Saharan African
Malawi		Malawi	Sub-Saharan African
Malaysia		Malaysia	Asian
Maldives		Maldives	Asian
Mali	Jews of Bilad el-Sudan	Mali	Sub-Saharan African
Malta		Malta	South European
Marshall Islands		Marshall Islands	Oceanian
Martinique		Martinique	Caribbean
Mauritania		Mauritania	Arab World and Sub-Saharan African
Mauritius		Mauritius	Sub-Saharan African
Mexico		Mexico, Latin America	Latin American; Mexican
Micronesia		Micronesia	Oceanian
Moldova	Bessarabian Jews	Moldova	East European
Monaco		Monaco	West European
Mongolia		Mongolia	Asian
Montenegro		Montenegro	South-East European
Morocco	Sephardi Jews, Mizrahi Jews	Morocco	Arab World
Mozambique		Mozambique	Sub-Saharan African
Myanmar		Myanmar	Asian
Namibia		Namibia	Sub-Saharan African
Nauru		Nauru	Oceanian
Nepal		Nepal	Asian
Netherlands	Sephardi and Ashkenazi	Netherlands and Chuts	West European
New Zealand		New Zealand	Oceanian
Nicaragua		Nicaragua	Latin American
Niger		Niger	Sub-Saharan African
Nigeria	Igbo Jews	Nigeria	Sub-Saharan African
North Macedonia		North Macedonia	South-East European
Norway		Norway	North European
Oman	Mizrahi Jews	Oman and exodus	Arab World
Pakistan	Pakistani Jews	Pakistan	Asian
Palau		Palau	Oceanian
Palestine	Palestinian Jews	Palestine	Arab World
Panama		Panama	Latin American
Papua New Guinea		Papua New Guinea	Oceanian
Paraguay	Ashkenazi Jews and Sephardi Jews	Paraguay	Latin American
Peru	Inca Jews, Amazonian Jews	Peru, Latin America, B'nai Moshe	Latin American
Philippines	Filipino Jews	Philippines	Asian
Poland	Chronology of Jewish Polish history	Poland	East European; Polish
Portugal	Spanish and Portuguese Jews	Portugal	South European and Iberian
Puerto Rico		Puerto Rico, Latin America	Latin American and Caribbean
Qatar		Qatar	Arab World
Romania	Ashkenazi Jews and Sephardi Jews	Romania and Moldova	East European; Romanian
Russia	Mountain Jews	Russia and Jewish Autonomous Oblast	East European; Russia, Ukraine, and Belarus
Rwanda		Rwanda	Sub-Saharan African
Saint Kitts and Nevis		Saint Kitts and Nevis	Caribbean
Saint Lucia		Saint Lucia	Caribbean
Saint Vincent and the Grenadines		Saint Vincent and the Grenadines	Caribbean
Samoa		Samoa	Oceanian
San Marino		San Marino	South European
São Tomé and Príncipe		São Tomé and Príncipe	Sub-Saharan African
Saudi Arabia		Saudi Arabia	Arab World
Senegal	Jews of Bilad el-Sudan	Senegal	Sub-Saharan African
Serbia		Serbia	South-East European
Seychelles		Seychelles	Sub-Saharan African
Sierra Leone		Sierra Leone	Sub-Saharan African
Singapore		Singapore	Asian
Slovakia	Oberlander Jews	Slovakia and Carpathian Ruthenia	East European
Slovenia		Slovenia	South-East European
Solomon Islands		Solomon Islands	Oceanian
Somalia		Somalia	Sub-Saharan African
South Africa		South Africa	Sub-Saharan African
South Sudan		South Sudan	Sub-Saharan African
Spain	Sephardi Jews	Spain	South European and Iberian
Sri Lanka		Sri Lanka	Asian
Sudan	Sudanese Jews	Sudan	Arab World and Sub-Saharan African
Suriname	Jodensavanne	Suriname	Caribbean
Sweden		Sweden	North European
Switzerland		Switzerland	West European
Syria	Syrian Jews and Kurdish Jews	Syria and exodus	Arab World
Taiwan		Taiwan	Asian
Tajikistan	Bukharian Jews	Tajikistan	Asian
Tanzania		Tanzania	Sub-Saharan African
Thailand		Thailand	Asian
Timor-Leste		Timor-Leste	Asian
Togo		Togo	Sub-Saharan African
Tonga		Tonga	Oceanian
Trinidad and Tobago		Trinidad and Tobago	Caribbean
Tunisia	Mizrahi Jews	Tunisia	Arab World
Turkey	Turkish Jews, Sephardi Jews, Karaite Jews, Ashkenazi Jews and Romaniotes	Turkey	Asian and South-East European
Turkmenistan	Bukharan Jews	Turkmenistan	Asian
Tuvalu		Tuvalu	Oceanian
Uganda	Abayudaya	Uganda	Sub-Saharan African
Ukraine	Crimean Karaites	Ukraine and Carpathian Ruthenia	East European; Ukrainian
United Arab Emirates		United Arab Emirates	Arab World
United Kingdom	British Jews	United Kingdom	West European; British
United States	American Jews	United States and Colonial era	American
United States Virgin Islands		United States Virgin Islands	Caribbean
Uruguay	Sephardi Jews and Ashkenazi Jews	Uruguay, Latin America	Latin American
Uzbekistan	Uzbek Jews (some of whom are Bukharan Jews)	Uzbekistan	Asian
Vanuatu		Vanuatu	Oceanian
Venezuela		Venezuela	Latin American
Vietnam		Vietnam	Asian
Western Sahara		Western Sahara	Arab World
Yemen	Yemenite Jews and Mizrahi Jews	Yemen and exodus	Arab World
Zambia		Zambia	Sub-Saharan African
Zimbabwe	Lemba people, Jews of Rusape	Zimbabwe	Sub-Saharan African

== See also ==
- Who is a Jew?
- Jewish ethnic divisions
- History of the Jews under Muslim rule
- Jewish population by country
- Historical Jewish population
- Historical Jewish population by country
- Lists of Jews
- Crypto-Judaism
- Antisemitism by country
