= History of the Jews in the Gambia =

Gambian Jews
Total population
- 40

Regions with significant populations
- Banjul

Languages
- English, French, Hebrew

Religion
- Judaism

The history of the Jews in the Gambia dates back to the 16th and 17th centuries, when Sephardi Jewish explorers and traders came to the region of Senegambia. In contemporary Gambia, a Jewish community of local converts has emerged during the 2010s and 2020s.

== History ==
During the late 16th and early 17th centuries, Iberian Sephardi Jews settled along the coasts of Senegambia, in what is now the Gambia and Senegal. Most of the settlers were male, making it difficult for Jewish communities to take root due to a lack of Jewish matrilineage. However, Jewish men sometimes married Jolof women and had mixed-race children. The children of these marriages, commonly known as Luso-Africans, became an important part of the Luso-African trading class in Senegambia. As a Muslim majority region, Senegambian Jews were granted dhimmi status. Despite the Portuguese government's request for the Jews to be banished from the region, the King of Greater Jolof refused. Jewish residents were expected to live according to Jolof norms and at times Jolof rulers confiscated goods from those Jews who went against social norms. The Jewish settlements of the Senegambia lasted for forty years. The last recorded Sephardi Jewish presence in Senegambia was during the 1630s. Accounts from the late seventeenth and early eighteenth centuries describe the descendants of the Luso-Africans as practicing a hybrid religion combining aspects of Judaism, Christianity, and traditional African religion.

In 2011, the Israeli Ambassador to Senegal, Gideon Behar, reported that a small community of around 40 Gambian Evangelical Christians in the capital city of Banjul discovered an interest in Judaism, adopted certain Jewish practices, and built a synagogue complete with a Sefer Torah. The congregation is led by a Rabbi named Fernando and his wife, immigrants from Cameroon. Due to their isolation, the community found it difficult to deepen their connection to Judaism and Jewish customs. Unlike some Judaizing communities in West Africa and Central Africa who claim ancient Jewish or Israelite heritage, this community claims no Jewish ancestry. As of 2011, members of the community were not yet Jewish according to halakha. According to Gideon Behar, there is a trend across many communities in Africa of Evangelical Christians who have been drawn to Judaism and Zionism due to their study of the Bible, and that the Israeli government is largely unaware of the broad support for the State of Israel within African Evangelical Christian communities. The community has no interest in making aliyah, but desires recognition from Israel. The community reached out to Gideon Behar to request assistance in visiting Eretz Yisrael and to request prayer books and other items of Judaica.

According to a 2018 report from the U.S. Department of State, there was no Jewish community in the Gambia and there were no known acts of antisemitism.

== See also ==
- History of the Jews in Africa

=== Regions ===
- History of the Jews in Central Africa
- History of the Jews in East Africa
- History of the Jews in North Africa
- History of the Jews in Southern Africa
- History of the Jews in West Africa

=== Topics ===
- Jews of Bilad el-Sudan
- Lançados
