= History of the Jews in Gabon =

Gabonese Jews
Regions with significant populations
- Bitam, Oyem

Languages
- French; Hebrew

Religion
- Judaism

The history of the Jews in Gabon dates back to at least the 17th century, when Black Jewish communities existed along the Gabonese coastline. The contemporary Jewish community in Gabon is small.

== History ==
In the seventeenth century, a Black Jewish community existed on the Loango coast in the Kingdom of Loango in what is now Gabon, the Republic of the Congo, and the Cabinda Province of Angola. This community was first mentioned in 1777 and a more thorough description was provided by the scientific works which were produced by the German Loango Expedition of 1873–76. This community had no links with Jewish communities elsewhere and has now disappeared. According to Tudor Parfitt, these communities were of considerable interest to race scientists during the period of the European Enlightenment. The Jewish community in the region may have been of Iberian Sephardi origin. Some European maps from the 17th century designate the Loango coastline as the Gulf of the Jews, golfo do judeus or golfos dos judeos. According to the Moravian missionary Christian Georg Andreas Oldendorp, the Black Jewish community in the Loango region was established by Jews from São Tomé who had been expelled and that it was from this population of exiles that "the black Portuguese and the black Jews of Loango, who were despised even by the local black population, were descended."

In 1994, an April Fool's Day broadcast on Israeli radio claimed that there was a tribe of Black Jews in Gabon who were descended from the Lost Tribes of Israel. At the time, there was only a tiny Jewish community in Gabon composed mostly of Israeli expatriates.

Small Jewish communities composed of former Christians have developed in the towns of Bitam and Oyem. These communities practice Jewish customs, but do not yet have synagogues. These communities are located in northern Gabon near the border with Cameroon and are led by Pascal Meka Ngomo, a former Evangelical Christian leader who abandoned Christianity for Judaism. The community hung its first mezuzah in 2014.

== See also ==
- History of the Jews in Africa

=== Regions ===
- History of the Jews in Central Africa
- History of the Jews in East Africa
- History of the Jews in North Africa
- History of the Jews in Southern Africa
- History of the Jews in West Africa
