= History of the Jews in Angola =

The location of Angola in Africa

The recorded history of the Jews in Angola stretches from the Middle Ages to modern times. A very small community of Jews lives in Angola mostly in the capital city of Luanda with a handful scattered elsewhere of mixed origins and backgrounds. There are also a number of transitory Israeli businesspeople living in Angola.

== Background ==
Angola is a country in southwestern Africa. From the fifteenth century, Portuguese colonists began trading there and a settlement was established at Luanda during the sixteenth century. Portugal annexed territories in the region which were ruled as a colony from 1655, and Angola was incorporated as an overseas province of Portugal in 1951. After the Angolan War of Independence (1961–1974) Angola's independence was achieved on 11 November 1975.

== Middle Ages ==
Some historians have noted the presence of Sephardi Jews in Portuguese West Africa by researching records from the Portuguese Inquisition relating to the New World. These show that there was a significant Sephardic presence in Angola and Guinea-Bissau trading posts and that Portuguese settlements were crucial in the development of a Crypto-Jewish diaspora across the Atlantic region.

Some historians claim that Paulo Dias de Novais (1510–1589), a grandson of Bartholomew Dias was a "Jewish" (probably meaning "Crypto-Jewish" or a Converso of some sort) colonizer who became "Lord-Proprietor" of Angola in 1571 who brought Jewish artisans to Luanda where a so-called "clandestine rabbi" was conducting services in a secret Luanda synagogue. By the late eighteenth century more Jews arrived and a community was functioning in Dondo.

=== Angola as a center of "Judaizers" ===
Historians record that there are a number of cases of Portuguese New Christians, such as Gaspar de Robles, Manuel Alvarez Pricto, testifying in the Americas that they were introduced to "Judaizing" by relatives and friends while in Angola, many attesting they were introduced to the "Law of Moses" in Angola.

== Early Modern history ==
Mariana Pequena, a black woman from Angola, was exported as a slave to Rio de Janeiro in Brazil in the late seventeenth century. After obtaining her freedom in Brazil, she began a relationship with a white Portuguese New Christian chose to convert to "Judaism" (perhaps meaning: Crypto-Judaism). In her confession, she revealed the full extent of her network which included many fellow believers. In 1711, being "accused of Judaism" she was condemned by the Portuguese Inquisition in Lisbon for her beliefs.

Some of the Jews of São Tomé and Príncipe later settled in the Kingdom of Loango, along the coasts of continental Africa in what is now the Cabinda Province of Angola, Gabon, and the Republic of the Congo.

== Modern history ==
There was a suggestion to create a Jewish "colony" or agricultural settlement in the Portuguese colony of Angola for Russian and Romanian Jews in the early 1900s. There was a prior proposal to set up a Jewish settlement in 1886 by the Alliance Juive Universelle encouraged by the Portuguese Jew S.A. Anahory. These efforts did not come to fruition. Another failed effort was the so-called "Angola Plan" with attempts from 1907 to 1913 by the Jewish Territorial Organization, under the influence of Israel Zangwill in Britain, to set up an autonomous Jewish entity somewhere in West Africa with Angola as a strong possibility. After 1910, Portugal's new republican leaders proposed Angola for Jewish colonization as both a practical solution to increasing the white population and to win support from liberal Jewish circles. By June 1912 the Portuguese chamber of deputies passed the final version of a bill to authorize concessions to Jewish settlers, clearly indicating Portugal's desire to use Jewish immigration to consolidate its hold over Angola. No financial support was offered and by 1913, many officials of the Jewish Territorial Organization in London turned against it in favor of settling Palestine. Another failed suggestion to settle Jews from Eastern Europe in Angola resurfaced in 1934.

In 2014 the Chabad Lubavitch movement opened a Chabad house in Luanda with many Jews in attendance.

=== Angola–Israel relations ===
Angola–Israel relations refers to the historical and current bilateral relationship between Angola and Israel. Angola has an embassy in Tel Aviv and Israel has an embassy in Luanda. The Israeli government aided the National Front for the Liberation of Angola in 1963 and 1969, during the Angolan War of Independence (1961–1974). In the 1960s, Holden Roberto, head of the NFLA, visited Israel and FNLA members were sent to Israel for training. In the 1970s, Israel shipped arms to the FNLA through Zaire. The Israeli embassy in Luanda was reopened in 1995, and Tamar Golan, who worked to maintain Israeli contacts with African countries throughout these decades, was appointed the Israeli ambassador. Tamar Golan left this post in 2002, but returned to Angola later on upon the request of the Angolan President José Eduardo dos Santos in order to help establish a task-force, under the auspices of the UN, for the removal of landmines. The Israeli company "Geomine" provided Angola with mine detecting equipment, in order to facilitate their removal. President Dos Santos visited Israel in 2005. In March 2006, the trade volume between the two countries amounted to $400 million. The Israeli ambassador to Angola is Raphael Singer. In 2010, the Angolan government refused to receive openly gay Isi Yanouka as the new ambassador due to his sexuality.

In August 2012, the Angolan chancellor made a three-day visit to Jerusalem, where the governments of Angola and Israel ratified in Tel Aviv an agreement to strengthen the bonds between both countries. Israeli President Shimon Peres said that this should be based on the fields of science and technology, economy, and security, and the Angolan chancellor expressed the desire to continue with the bilateral cooperation in health, agriculture, science and technology, and the formation of Angolan experts.

A 2018 report in the Algemeiner Journal: "Ambassador: Israel to Invest $60 million in Angola, Including Solar Power Plant," that Israel allocated $60 million to invest in Angola, including the construction of a solar power plant in the province of Benguela according to an AllAfrica.com report. Ambassador Oren Rosenblat made the announcement after a meeting with Benguela Governor Rui Falcão.

=== Arcadi Gaydamak ===
In a 2006 article titled "Luanda Made Him a Billionaire and a Diplomat" in the Israeli newspaper Haaretz, it was reported that Arcadi Gaydamak was "one of the most influential business people in Angola and one of the closest to the corridors of power with ties to president Jose Eduardo dos Santos and dos Santos' daughter businesswoman Isabel dos Santos, generals and high-ranking police officers trace back several years." According to this report the close relationship garnered Gaydamak an Angolan diplomatic passport, as well as French, Canadian, Russian and Israeli citizenship and holding a "title" in the Angolan embassy in Moscow. Angola turned him into a billionaire estimated at $3 billion in an interview with Haaretz. Flying the new president of the state-owned Russian rough diamond exporter Alrosa to Luanda to introduce him to dos Santos.

=== Angolagate ===
In October 2009, Arcadi Gaydamak (b. 1952) a Russian Jew from Israel living in France and French magnate Pierre Falcone were convicted by a French court of organizing arms trafficking in Angola during the civil war in 1993–1998, to the value of US$790 million, in violation of the Lusaka Protocol. Gaydamak was sentenced in absentia, and it was unclear whether he would ever serve the six-year prison term, since he returned to Israel where he is known as a generous Israeli philanthropist. His conviction on the arms dealing charges was overturned by the Court of Appeal in Paris on 29 April 2011.

== See also ==
- History of the Jews in Africa

=== Regions: ===
- History of the Jews in Central Africa
- History of the Jews in East Africa
- History of the Jews in North Africa
- History of the Jews in Southern Africa
- History of the Jews in West Africa

=== Topics: ===
- Religion in Angola: Judaism
- Freedom of religion in Angola
