= History of the Jews in Guinea-Bissau =

Guinea-Bissauan Jews
Regions with significant populations
- Bissau

Languages
- Portuguese, Hebrew

Religion
- Judaism

The history of the Jews in Guinea-Bissau date back at least to the 15th century, when Sephardi Jewish traders and explorers arrived in the region from Portugal. Portuguese Sephardi Jews maintained a presence in colonial Guinea for centuries. The contemporary Jewish community in Guinea-Bissau is small.

== History ==
During the late 15th century and early 16th century, Portuguese Jews escaping religious persecution in Portugal during the Portuguese Inquisition formed Jewish communities along the coasts of the Upper Guinea from Sierra Leone to Senegal, including what is now Guinea-Bissau. These Portuguese settlers, known as lançados, married local African women and formed families. These mixed-race Black Sephardi communities are often known as Luso-Africans. Much early commerce in along the Upper Guinea coastline was conducted by lançados who sailed to and from S. Domingos, located north of present-day Bissau. Mixed-race Black Sephardi Jews in the region were referred to as filhos de terra and were generally considered "Portuguese".

According to Gideon Behar, the Israeli ambassador to Senegal, Jewish people maintained a continuous presence in Guinea-Bissau until 1943, when the Jewish community was uprooted during the rule of the fascist dictator Antonio de Oliveira Salazar. Guinea-Bissau was then known as Portuguese Guinea, a colony of Portugal.

According to a 2019 report from the United States Department of State, the Jewish community in Guinea-Bissau was small and mostly composed of foreign-born residents.

== See also ==
- History of the Jews in Africa

=== Regions ===
- History of the Jews in Central Africa
- History of the Jews in East Africa
- History of the Jews in North Africa
- History of the Jews in Southern Africa
- History of the Jews in West Africa

=== Topics ===
- Jews of Bilad el-Sudan
- Lançados
- Luso-Africans
