= History of the Jews in Guinea =

Guinea Jews
Regions with significant populations
- Conakry

Languages
- French, Hebrew

Religion
- Judaism

The history of the Jews in Guinea date back at least to the 15th century, when Sephardi Jewish traders and explorers arrived in the region from Portugal. The contemporary Jewish community in Guinea-Bissau is very small.

== History ==
During the late 15th century and early 16th century, Portuguese Jews escaping religious persecution in Portugal during the Portuguese Inquisition formed Jewish communities along the coasts of the Upper Guinea from Sierra Leone to Senegal, including in what is now Guinea. These Portuguese settlers, known as lançados, married local African women and formed families. These mixed-race Black Sephardi communities are often known as Luso-Africans. Much early commerce in along the Upper Guinea coastline was conducted by lançados who sailed to and from S. Domingos, located north of present-day Bissau, to other Sephardi settlements in Cape Verde, Senegal, the Gambia, and elsewhere. Mixed-race Black Sephardi Jews in the region were referred to as filhos de terra and were generally considered "Portuguese".

In 2008, 50 Israelis became stranded in the Guinean capital city of Conakry during an army mutiny. The Israelis maintained contact with Chabad of Central Africa during the unrest. Some were evacuated, while others chose to remain until the unrest had settled. None were injured.

According to a 2022 report from the United States Department of State, the Jewish community in Guinea was very small and there were no reported instances of antisemitic acts.

== See also ==
- History of the Jews in Africa

=== Regions ===
- History of the Jews in Central Africa
- History of the Jews in East Africa
- History of the Jews in North Africa
- History of the Jews in Southern Africa
- History of the Jews in West Africa

=== Topics ===
- Jews of Bilad el-Sudan
- Lançados
- Luso-Africans
