= History of the Jews in Liberia =

The history of the Jews in Liberia is very strongly linked with Israel–Liberia relations. Liberia cast the deciding vote at the United Nations for the creation of the Jewish state of Israel in 1947. Liberia voted in favor of UN Resolution 181 on November 29, 1947, supporting the partition of Palestine and creation of a Jewish state. Official records of this vote are maintained in the "Welcome to the United Nations archives" detailing the 33–13 tally. In 1958, Israel's then Foreign Minister Golda Meir visited Liberia to discuss expansion of Israel-Liberian diplomatic and trade relations, the opening of a Liberian embassy in Jerusalem, the establishment of a joint Israel-Liberian shipping line, and the possibility of Israel purchasing diamonds from Liberia.

== The Holocaust ==
In 1938, 400 Jewish refugees sailed from Austria, on the steamer Draga, from the Danube port of Galatz for Monrovia, capital of Liberia. The refugees were scheduled to settle in Liberia with the permission of the Liberian Government.

== African Hebrew Israelites in Israel: Settlement in Liberia (1967–1969) ==
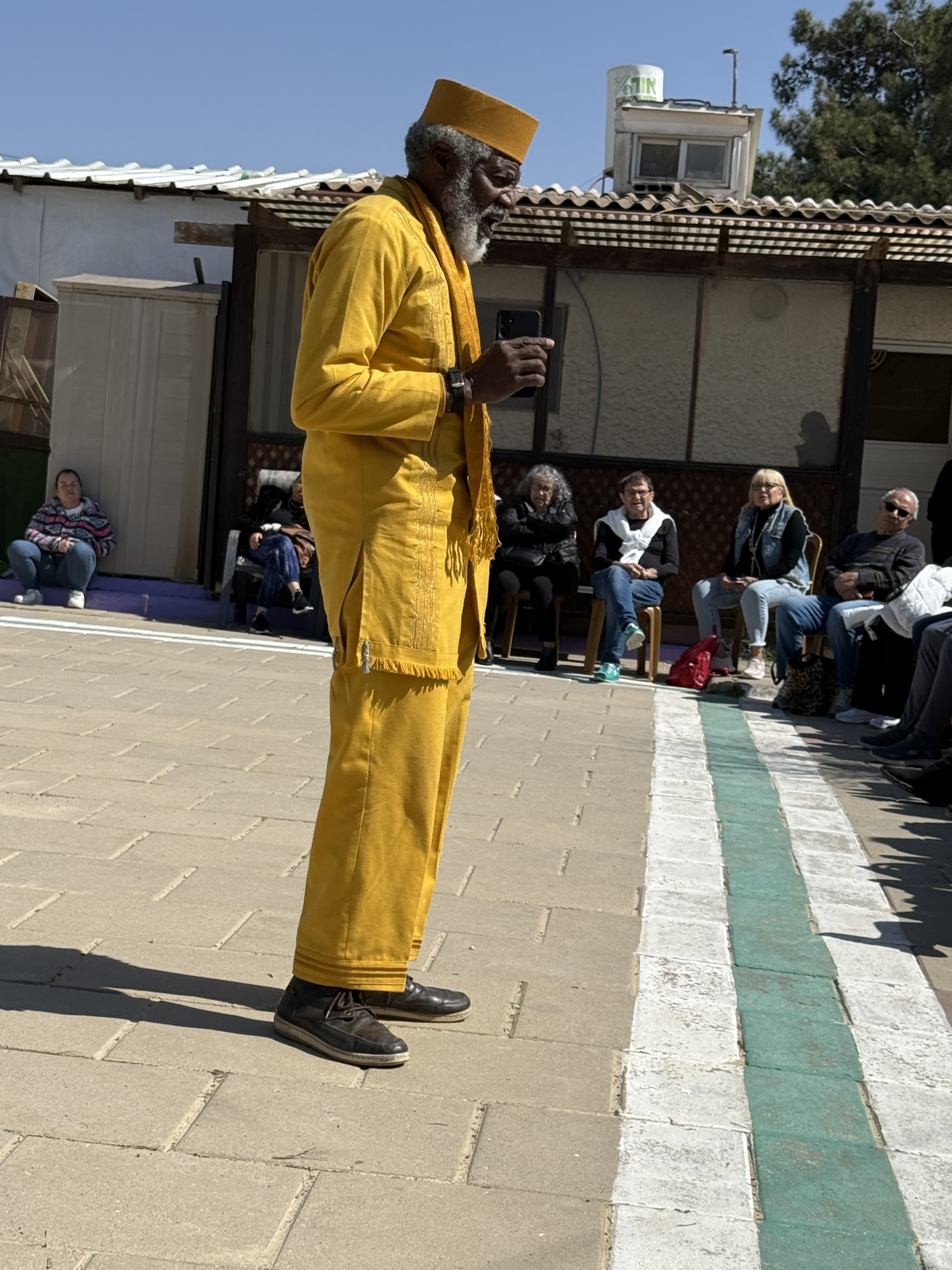
African Hebrew Israelites in Israel migrated to Israel from the USA via Liberia.

In 1967 a reported total of 173 black men, women and children arrived in Liberia from the United States. The men chose names such as El Kannann ben Israel, Gavreale Kahtan Israel and Ahshare Ahkiba Israel. Ben Ammi Ben-Israel and eventually 350 of his followers first settled in Liberia in 1967. There, they built a community which adhered to the "laws of righteousness". Prince Rakhamim, who was a community leader at that time, described what living in Liberia did for the community:

We chose to stay there about two and a half years in order to get rid of the foolishness of America before making way to the land of Israel. To make a person born again. To die from the hell we came out of, to get rid of it, to learn to get rid of the hate, to get rid of our bitterness, Liberia was always conceived as the place where we would learn to be righteous. Those of us who wanted to do right shedded off the hate and came home to Israel.

=== Ben Ammi Ben-Israel (Ben Carter) ===
Ben Ammi Ben-Israel (1939–2014) in 1964 he and several others founded the Abeta Hebrew Israel Culture Center in Chicago. According to the Hebrew Israelite community, in 1966, Ben Ammi received a vision from the angel Gabriel, who told him to lead African-Americans to Israel. In the vision, he claimed he was instructed to: "Lead the children of Israel among African Americans to the promised land, and establish the long-awaited Kingdom of God." In any case, Ben Ammi was one of four members of the Abeta Hebrew Israel Cultural Center to be chosen to travel to Liberia to explore the possibility of settlement there. In July 1967, a number of Abeta families began to arrive in Liberia, settling in spartan conditions on land purchased by an African American citizen of Liberia on behalf of the community. In accordance with their beliefs they were the descendants of "ancient Israelites".

== Israel–Liberia relations ==
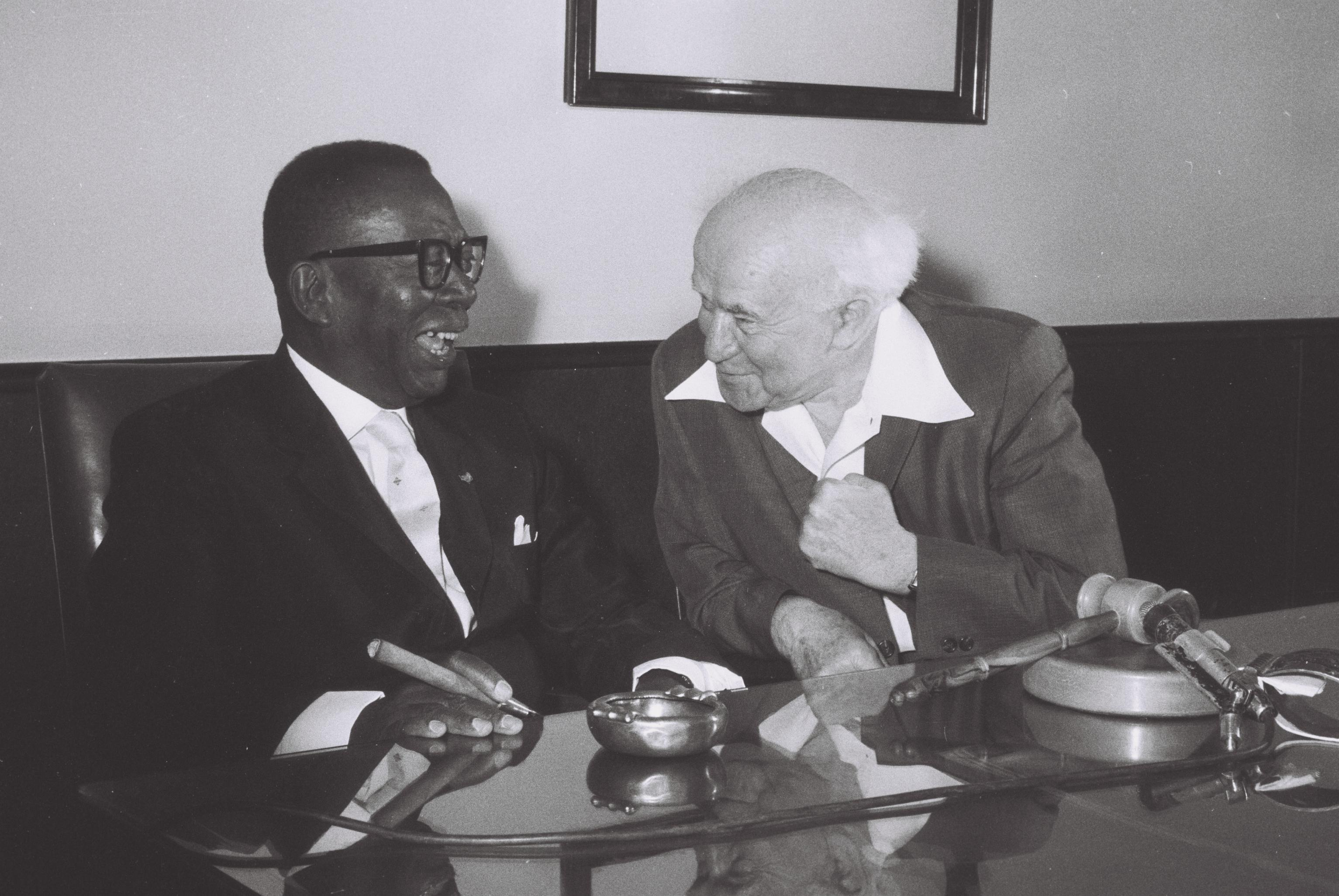
Former Liberian President William Tubman with then Israeli Prime Minsiter David Ben-Gurion in 1962.

Liberia was one of the United Nations member states to vote in favor of statehood for Israel in 1947. Liberia was initially against the partition plan, but was threatened by the United States with cutting foreign aid funds if Liberia voted against the plan. Liberian President William Tubman was a supporter of Israel while in office. It was shown in declassified documents from the Israeli Ministry of Foreign Affairs that diplomatic officials in the Tubman administration, including representatives to the UN, were bribed by Israel in the form of cash and gifts in exchange for diplomatic support.

Israeli and Liberian relations were severed by Liberian President William Tolbert in 1973, following the Yom Kippur War. In 1980, Tolbert was assassinated by Samuel Doe and his People's Redemption Council, who subsequently took control of the Liberian government. In 1983, Israel bribed five officials in the Doe regime in exchange for a renewal of relations, and on 13 August, Doe re-established ties with Israel.

In 1983 Doe stated that to equate Zionism with racism—as the United Nations did in 1975—is to "desecrate" Israel's struggle to achieve independence and nationhood and esserted that at a reception in his honor given at the headquarters of the Anti-Defamation League of B'nai B'rith opposite the United Nations headquarters. That same year, then Israeli Premier Menachem Begin met with President Samuel Doe and complimented him on the courage of his decision to renew diplomatic relations with Israel and to visit Jerusalem. Doe, in turn, promised to do everything in his power to influence other Black African heads of state to renew diplomatic ties with Israel. Agreements were reached for Israel to send a team of eye specialists and agricultural experts and set up a Liberian shipping line and a chain of supermarkets. Doe reportedly also asked Israel to help convince American Jews to invest in Liberia. In 2019 Liberian President George Weah met in Jerusalem with Israeli Prime Minister Benjamin Netanyahu, who has made strengthening ties with Africa a foreign policy priority. Netanyahu visited the Liberian capital Monrovia in 2017 to attend a summit of West African leaders and said Israel was "returning to Africa in a big way. Africa is coming to Israel and so is the entire world. We are turning Israel into a rising global power."

== Charles Taylor ==
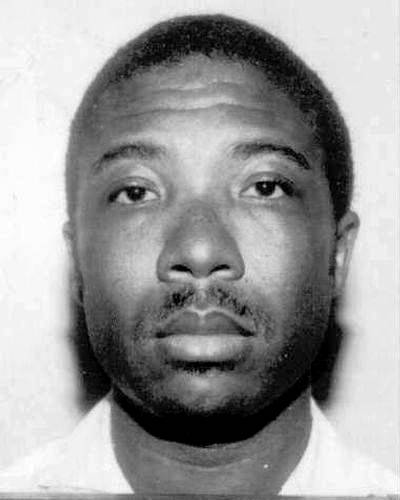
Former Liberian President Charles Taylor is said to have adopted Judaism in 2009.

In 2009, Victoria Taylor, wife of former Liberian president Charles Taylor, claimed in a radio interview that Taylor had adopted Judaism while in prison. "He has decided to become a Jew," she said. "And he wants to follow the true religion according to him. He wants to know deeply about God." In that same interview, however, she also claimed that Taylor remained a Christian, asserting that "He wants to follow the two religions."

== US Jews' relationship to Liberia ==
Various US Jewish charities provided assistance to Liberia and Liberians, such as the American Jewish World Service (AJWS). A 2003 report from the AJWS states that it launched an emergency campaign to help Liberian non-governmental organizations engaged in peacemaking efforts and conflict resolution.

The American based Orthodox Hasidic Chabad organization provided long-distance services to Jewish US troops based in Liberia fighting Ebola. A 2014 report described how Jewish soldiers deployed to Barclay Training Center in Monrovia, as part of Joint Forces Command–United Assistance, were able to hold on to a major traditional holiday, namely Hanukkah, by a Chabad-Lubavitch rabbi and U.S. Army Chaplain, from his home base of Fort Leonard Wood in Missouri.

== See also ==
- History of the Jews in Africa

=== Regions: ===
- History of the Jews in Central Africa
- History of the Jews in East Africa
- History of the Jews in North Africa
- History of the Jews in Southern Africa
- History of the Jews in West Africa
