= History of the Jews in Lesotho =

Lesotho Jews
Regions with significant populations
- Maseru

Languages
- English, Sotho

Religion
- Judaism

The history of the Jews in Lesotho is connected to the much larger Jewish community of the surrounding country of South Africa. The Jewish community is small.

== History ==
The history of the Jewish presence in Lesotho dates back to the Second Boer War of 1864–1865, when a German-Jewish immigrant named Moritz Leviseur fought for the Free State forces that invaded the country. During Lesotho's colonial period, some European Jews settled in Lesotho. Following World War II, Jewish refugees from Nazi Europe temporarily increased the Jewish population. Since World War II, most Jews living in Lesotho have lived there temporarily for business purposes. However, in 1999, Lesotho's Jewish community sent a delegate to the Commonwealth Jewish Congress conference in London.

The World Jewish Congress has reported that only a handful of Jewish people in Lesotho belong to the Lesotho Jewish Community, which is affiliated with the Congress. Almost all Lesotho Jews live in the capital city of Maseru.

In 2005 King Letsie III of Lesotho hosted a delegation of the African Jewish Congress (AJC) at his royal palace in Maseru. The AJC, which operates under the auspices of the South African Jewish Board of Deputies, acts as a coordinating representative body for the Jewish communities of Southern Africa. The delegation comprised Rabbi Moshe Silberhaft, spiritual leader to the AJC, and long-time Maseru resident Yehuda Danziger.

According to a 2020 report from the United States Department of State, Lesotho had a small Jewish community and there were no reported instances of antisemitic acts.

== Israel–Lesotho relations ==
Israel and Lesotho have had full diplomatic relations since 1968 Foreign relations of Israel#Diplomatic relations Foreign relations of Lesotho#Diplomatic relations following Lesotho's independence from Great Britain in 1966, with Israeli ambassadors serving in Lesotho.

== See also ==
- History of the Jews in Africa

=== Regions ===
- History of the Jews in Central Africa
- History of the Jews in East Africa
- History of the Jews in North Africa
- History of the Jews in Southern Africa
- History of the Jews in West Africa
