= History of the Jews in Ivory Coast =

Ivorian Jews
Total population
- 150

Regions with significant populations
- Abidjan

Languages
- French, Hebrew

Religion
- Judaism

The history of the Jews in Ivory Coast dates back at least 50 years. A small Jewish community has emerged in the capital city of Abidjan. Most Ivorian Jews are either local converts or foreign-born residents.

== History ==
The emerging Jewish community in Ivory Coast has its roots in the International Kabbalah Centres that have been established throughout Africa. A group of Kabbalah practitioners led by Cornet Alexandre Zouko decided to begin practicing Orthodox Judaism. Under Zouko's guidance, members of the community began to learn how to daven and observe Jewish holidays, as well as studied Hebrew. Unlike many African Jews who live in poverty, the emerging Jewish community in Abidjan is primarily middle class. The community reached out to the organization Kulanu in 2014, a group that helps isolated and emerging Jewish communities in Africa and elsewhere. Kulanu donated a Sefer Torah to the community, along with siddurim, machzorim, and other Judaica.

According to the U.S. Department of State, there have been no known acts of antisemitism in Ivory Coast.

In 2017, a Jewish conversion panel traveled to Abidjan to finalize the conversion of 42 people to Judaism. Converts were immersed in a mikveh and male converts were circumcised.

In 2018, a Chabad house was established in Abidjan to primarily serve Israeli residents and visitors. The Chabad house in Abidjan is the seventh community founded by Chabad of Central Africa, which maintains a presence throughout Central and West Africa.

In December 2022, representatives of Jewish communities throughout sub-Saharan Africa met in Abidjan in order to create an umbrella organization to represent Jewish communities throughout Central and West Africa. The group announced plans to build a new synagogue in Abidjan.

== See also ==
- History of the Jews in Africa

=== Regions ===
- History of the Jews in Central Africa
- History of the Jews in East Africa
- History of the Jews in North Africa
- History of the Jews in Southern Africa
- History of the Jews in West Africa
