= History of the Jews in the Republic of the Congo =

Congolese Jews
Languages
- French, Hebrew

Religion
- Judaism

The history of the Jews in the Republic of the Congo dates back to at least the 17th century, when Black Jewish communities existed along the Congolese coastline. The contemporary Jewish community is small.

== History ==
In the seventeenth century, a Black Jewish community existed on the Loango coast in the Kingdom of Loango, in what is now the Republic of the Congo and Gabon. This community was first mentioned in 1777 and a more thorough description was provided by the scientific works which were produced by the German Loango Expedition of 1873–76. This community had no links with Jewish communities elsewhere and has now disappeared. According to Tudor Parfitt, these communities were of considerable interest to race scientists during the period of the European Enlightenment. The Jewish community in the region may have been of Iberian Sephardi origin. Some European maps from the 17th century designate the Loango coastline as the Gulf of the Jews, golfo do judeus or golfos dos judeos. According to the Moravian missionary Christian Georg Andreas Oldendorp, the Black Jewish community in the Loango region was established by Jews from São Tomé who had been expelled and that it was from this population of exiles that "the black Portuguese and the black Jews of Loango, who were despised even by the local black population, were descended."

According to a 2021 report from the United States Department of State, there was a small Jewish community in the Republic of the Congo and no reported instances of antisemitic acts. The Congolese Jewish community has no synagogue.

== See also ==
- History of the Jews in Africa

=== Regions ===
- History of the Jews in Central Africa
- History of the Jews in East Africa
- History of the Jews in North Africa
- History of the Jews in Southern Africa
- History of the Jews in West Africa
