= History of the Jews in Mozambique =

The location of Mozambique in Africa

The history of the Jews in Mozambique, until 1975, was closely connected with the history of Judaism through the former Portuguese Empire, particularly those elements of it operating on the coastlines of the Indian Ocean. By the time the first Portuguese ships entered this ocean in the late 15th century, Jewish merchants and persons connected with sea work had lived on, and next to, this ocean for many centuries. As a European presence deepened by the late 19th century in the Portuguese East African colonial capital then called "Lourenço Marques", a cluster of Jews of diverse backgrounds were living there.

== One synagogue ==
After 1900, the same history became closely connected with the identity and operations of what became the Maputo Hebrew Congregation Synagogue. The Maputo synagogue traces its congregational records to 1899 when political upheavals connected with the Boer War caused the rabbi Joseph Hertz, then of Johannesburg, to briefly move to the Mozambique capital as a refugee. Rev. Dr. Hertz urged his co-religionists in Lourenço Marques to take steps to organize themselves as a community, including the commencement of pathways for Jewish education and the acquisition of land parcels for a synagogue and a Jewish cemetery. After a period of community development, these urgings flowered in 1926 with the construction of the Lourenço Marques Synagogue, a facility with a congregation of about 30 Jews. The emigration of European Jews as a result of the Holocaust led to the Jewish population of Lourenço Marques peaking at approximately 500 in 1942.

With other organized religious organizations then operating in Mozambique, the Maputo congregation was dispersed in 1975–1976 by the revolutionary Frelimo government, and the synagogue was expropriated. The Jewish community reclaimed the building and reorganized in 1989; however, a report dated in 2008 indicates that the congregation had not recovered to pre-1975 levels. The Jewish community of Maputo, which was relatively coterminous with the overall Jewish permanent-residency population of Mozambique as a whole, was in 2008 approximately 20 persons.

In 2010 the Jewish community of Maputo officially reorganized as Honen Dalim: The Jewish Community of Mozambique (Associação Honen Dalim - Comunidade Judaica de Moçambique). The original synagogue underwent a complete renovation in 2013. It currently hosts weekly services and events for the Jewish community of Mozambique, attracting permanent residents and guests from around the world. The number in the Jewish community was reported to be 35 in 2018, and described as "thriving."

== See also ==
- History of the Jews in Africa

=== Regions: ===
- History of the Jews in Central Africa
- History of the Jews in East Africa
- History of the Jews in North Africa
- History of the Jews in Southern Africa
- History of the Jews in West Africa
