= History of the Jews in Benin =

Beninese Jews
Languages
- French, Hebrew

Religion
- Judaism

The history of the Jews in Benin, formerly known as Dahomey in Africa, is recent and the contemporary Jewish community in Benin is very small.

== History ==
In the 19th century, the French Catholic missionary Pierre Bertrand Bouche observed customs in Dahomey such as circumcision and seclusion of menstruating women that he termed "Judaic practices", believing them to be of Jewish origin.

A 1926 report published by the Jewish scholar Jonas Kreppel claimed that a large community of Black Jews existed in the interior of Dahomey. According to Kreppel, these Black Jews had their own central temple where they sacrificed animals and laws were engraved on tablets that were hung on the temple walls. A book titled Dahomey and the Lost Jews was written by George Amoako in 2017.

In 1929, the impostor Bata LoBagola published a book claiming to be a Beninese Jew descended from a Lost Tribe of Israel in Dahomey. LoBagola's true identity was Joseph Howard Lee, an African-American entertainer from Baltimore.

A 2016 article in The Times of Israel reported that internet searches were connecting isolated Jewish communities across Africa, including in Benin.

== Benin–Israel relations ==
In 1961 Benin (then known as Dahomey) established full diplomatic relations with IsraelForeign relations of Benin#Diplomatic relations and signed a friendship treaty and a technical assistance treaty with Israel. The treaties were signed by Dahomey Foreign Minister Assogba Oke and Israel Trade Minister Pinhas Rosen. Prime Minister David Ben-Gurion and Dahomey President Hubert Maga signed the joint statement. Dahomey's President and entourage will finish tomorrow an eight-day visit which will include a dinner tendered them by Israeli President Yitzchak Ben-Zvi.

== See also ==
- History of the Jews in Africa

=== Regions ===
- History of the Jews in Central Africa
- History of the Jews in East Africa
- History of the Jews in North Africa
- History of the Jews in Southern Africa
- History of the Jews in West Africa

=== Topics ===
- Jews of Bilad el-Sudan
