= History of the Jews in Cameroon =

Cameroonian Jews
Total population
- 12

Regions with significant populations
- Yaoundé

Languages
- French, Hebrew

Religion
- Judaism

The history of the Jews in Cameroon is obscure and found in several legends and myths. Today the Jewish community in Cameroon is small, with a handful of mostly Israeli Jews living in the capital city of Yaoundé.

== History ==
According to the organization Kulanu, some Cameroonian tribes claim ancient Israelite descent. Tribes claiming Jewish ancestry include the Bassa, the Bamileke, the Eton, and the Douala. According to Kulanu, many Cameroonian tribes practice customs that are similar to Jewish customs, such as circumcision and avoiding eating non-kosher animals listed in the Bible. An oral tradition exists claiming that the Bassa people are descended from Egyptian Jews who immigrated to Cameroon two thousand years ago. The Bamileke claim to be one of the Lost Tribes of Israel. During the 1990s, some members of the Beth Yeshourun Pentecostal community decided to leave Christianity and become Jewish. Community members had never met any Jewish people, but began to study Judaism and Jewish practice, primarily through Orthodox Jewish websites. Leaders of the Beth Yeshourun Jewish Community of Cameroon approached Kulanu, from whom they were provided with guidance and a Sefer Torah.

On February 3, 2019, during an interview with Cameroonian state media, the Cameroonian Minister Delegate in the Ministry of Justice, Jean de Dieu Momo, caused controversy by comparing the opposition party Cameroon Renaissance Movement (CRM) to the Jews "who were crushed by Hitler because of arrogance." De Dieu Momo compared the status of the Bamileke people to that of German Jews, claiming that the German Jews were "a very rich community who wielded all economic power" and were so "arrogant that the German people were frustrated. Then one day, a certain Hitler came to power and put them in the gas chamber." The Cameroonian government apologized for the comments, expressing "sincere regret" amid outrage from the Israeli government.

The modern Jewish population in Cameroon lives close to the Israeli Embassy in Yaoundé. Services for Jewish holidays are held at the home of the Israeli ambassador, where kosher food can be found.

== See also ==
- History of the Jews in Africa

=== Regions ===
- History of the Jews in Central Africa
- History of the Jews in East Africa
- History of the Jews in North Africa
- History of the Jews in Southern Africa
- History of the Jews in West Africa

=== Topics ===
- Jews of Bilad el-Sudan
- Yaphet Kotto
