= History of the Jews in Tanzania =

Tanzanian Jews
Regions with significant populations
- Arusha

Languages
- English, Swahili, Hebrew

Religion
- Judaism

The history of the Jews in Tanzania dates back at least to the 1880s, when Yemenite, Ethiopian, and Omani Jews arrived in Tanzania. A later influx of Polish and German Jews settled in Tanzania between the 1930s and the 1950s, fleeing persecution in Nazi Europe.

== History ==
A Jewish community has existed in the city of Arusha for over a century. The Jewish community of Arusha was founded by Yemenite Jews who had crossed the Gulf of Aden in the 1880s, passing through Ethiopia and Kenya before settling in Tanzania. Moroccan, Omani, and Ethiopian Jews also settled in Arusha. Many were from the towns of Mawza and Sanaa. Some Yemenites from Zanzibar also later moved to Arusha. During the 1930s, around 5,000 Polish Jews fleeing Nazi persecution joined the Arusha Jewish community. Due to antisemitism, the Jewish community kept a low profile. Due to antisemitic violence and aggressive missionary activities, the community began to disperse during the 1960s. The synagogue in Arusha was destroyed and its Sefer Torah burned. Political and economic instability following Tanzania's independence in 1961 motivated many Tanzanian Jews to leave the country. Some Jews who remained practiced Judaism in secret or joined the Maasai people.

In 2018, Chabad-Lubavitch of Zanzibar was established as the first Jewish center in the Muslim-majority province of Zanzibar.

In 2019, Kehillat Beth Israel of Ottawa donated a Sefer Torah to the Jewish community of Arusha.

== See also ==
- History of the Jews in Africa

=== Regions ===
- History of the Jews in Central Africa
- History of the Jews in East Africa
- History of the Jews in North Africa
- History of the Jews in Southern Africa
- History of the Jews in West Africa

=== Topics ===
- Beta Israel
- Yemenite Jews
