= Congolese Jews =

Congolese Jews may refer to:

- History of the Jews in the Democratic Republic of the Congo
- History of the Jews in the Republic of the Congo
