= History of the Jews in Sierra Leone =

Sierra Leonean Jews
Regions with significant populations
- Freetown

Languages
- English, Krio, Hebrew

Religion
- Judaism

The history of the Jews in Sierra Leone date back at least to the 15th century, when Sephardi Jewish traders and explorers arrived in the region from Portugal.

During the late 15th and early 16th centuries, Portuguese Jews escaping religious persecution in Portugal during the Portuguese Inquisition formed Jewish communities along the coasts of the Upper Guinea from, Sierra Leone to Senegal. These Portuguese settlers, known as lançados, married local African women and formed families. These mixed-race Black Sephardi communities are often known as Luso-Africans. Much early commerce in Sierra Leone was conducted by lançados who sailed to and from the region to S. Domingos, located north of present-day Bissau. Mixed-race Black Sephardi Jews in the region were referred to as filhos de terra and were generally considered "Portuguese".

A small of number of European and American Jews settled in the British Sierra Leone Colony and Protectorate between 1831 and 1934. Some of the Jewish merchants who settled in Sierra Leone were an important part of the colonial European population and helped pioneer European commerce in the hinterlands of Sierra Leone.

Matthew Nathan was a British born Jew who was named governor of Sierra Leone in 1899.

== See also ==
- History of the Jews in Africa

=== Regions ===
- History of the Jews in Central Africa
- History of the Jews in East Africa
- History of the Jews in North Africa
- History of the Jews in Southern Africa
- History of the Jews in West Africa

=== Topics ===
- Jews of Bilad el-Sudan
- Lançados
- Luso-Africans
