= History of the Jews in São Tomé and Príncipe =

São Tomé and Príncipe Jews
Total population
- 0

Regions with significant populations
- Príncipe

Languages
- Portuguese, Creole

Religion
- Judaism

The history of the Jews in São Tomé and Príncipe dates back to the late 1400s, when Portuguese Jews were expelled from Portugal.

== History ==
In 1496, King Manuel I of Portugal punished Portuguese Jews who refused to pay a head tax by deporting almost 2,000 Jewish children to São Tomé and Príncipe. The children ranged in age between 2 and 10. The children were forcefully converted, raised as Roman Catholics, and worked in the sugar trade, where they had to fend off crocodiles. A year after being deported to the islands, only 600 children remained alive. Some of the children tried to retain their Judaism and Jewish heritage. Until the early 1600s, descendants of the deported Jewish children retained some Jewish practices. By the 18th century, the Jewish heritage on the islands had largely dissipated.

A generation later, when Portugal colonized Brazil, some of the grown children were sent to work in the Brazilian sugar trade.

A new community of Jews was established on the islands in the 19th and 20th centuries with the arrival of a small number of Jewish sugar and cocoa traders.

In contemporary São Tomé and Príncipe, there are no practicing Jews. However, living descendants of the Portuguese-Jewish children remain on the islands where they are visibly distinctive due to their lighter complexions. On July 12, 1995, an international conference was held on the islands' twentieth independence day to commemorate the Portuguese-Jewish children who were deported to the islands in the 15th century.

Some of the Jews of São Tomé and Príncipe later settled in the Kingdom of Loango, along the coasts of continental Africa in what is now Gabon, the Republic of the Congo, and the Cabinda Province of Angola.

== See also ==
- History of the Jews in Africa

=== Regions ===
- History of the Jews in Central Africa
- History of the Jews in East Africa
- History of the Jews in North Africa
- History of the Jews in Southern Africa
- History of the Jews in West Africa

=== Topics ===
- Religion in São Tomé and Príncipe
