= History of the Jews in Cambodia =

The history of the Jews in Cambodia is based on very small numbers of Jews working or settling in modern-day Cambodia, as well as many Jewish tourists who pass through.

== Facts and figures ==
There is a Chabad house run by a rabbi in the city of Phnom Penh.

An American Jewish attorney, law professor, prosecutor and criminologist Phil Weiner was knighted by the Cambodian government for his training of Cambodian law enforcement officers. He received the Royal Order of Sahametrei.

Elior Koroghli, a granddaughter of a Cambodian princess who had converted from Theravada Buddhism to Orthodox Judaism and great-granddaughter of King Monivong, who ruled Cambodia until 1941, celebrated her Bat Mitzva in Cambodia.

Cambodian women have become a source for the human hair for wigs, known as sheitels worn by very religious Orthodox Jewish women. This has become a lucrative export for Cambodia.

A Jewish philanthropy in America, Jewish Helping Hands, helps support an orphanage in Phum Thom and Phnom Penh.

== Jews and Judaism in Cambodia ==
According to the early Spanish explorer Gabriel Quiroga de San Antonio, the complex of Angkor Wat was built by Roman Jews, who later moved to China, a clearly erroneous statement.

A self-declared rabbi, David Adollah (Cambodian name: Hang Pith), leads a community of native Cambodians who have chosen to follow some Jewish customs and holidays. There is a small Progressive Judaism community in Phnom Penh. The Jews in Cambodia are very progressive according to Brad Gordon, one of the Jewish community's informal organizers. Many of them work for NGOs. The informal Jewish community started getting together during the Jewish holidays and by 2008, the group began to get more serious and sponsored a Conservative Judaism rabbi to lead the Jewish High Holiday services.

There are a few notable Jews and Israelis who are involved in projects to better the lives of Cambodians, for example, the Palti family of Melbourne, Australia founded the not-for-profit Cambodia Rural Students Trust (CRST), which has set up social enterprise projects in the town of Siem Reap in the country's north-west. CRST began after a visit to Cambodia by the Paltis in 2009, when their daughter Stephanie volunteered to teach at a school at Bakong near Siem Reap. The plight of local Cambodian youth dropping out of school to work for meagre wages to support their families stirred Aviv, his wife Michelle, daughters Stephanie and Jessica, Aviv's parents Nili and Uri, and other family members. They felt compelled to offer a helping hand. By 2023 CRST sponsored 104 students from Cambodian rural families to study at the best local high school and university. After consulting Jessica Palti, CRST's co-founder, Israeli embassador Orna Sagiv made proposals to the Israeli Ministry of Foreign Affairs, which approved funding for two key CRST projects: "Project B", Bicycles for Education, which distributes bicycles to students who walk many kilometres to school, deterring some from attending. Israel will fund the purchase of bicycles and "Project T", Trees for Life, a land reclamation program in which semi-mature shade trees are planted on desolate terrain. Israel will fund trees and a watering program.

== Comparison of the Jewish and Cambodian Holocausts ==
Scholars have noted and done research in the similarities and comparisons between The Holocaust of the Jews and the Killing Fields of Cambodia in modern times also known as the Cambodian Holocaust. The Jewish Holocaust during WWII and the Cambodian Genocide were both massive genocides; however, the Holocaust during WWII focused on the Jews and the Cambodian Genocide focused mainly on people who were educated or could not work in a farm. In a 2017 article in the Times of Israel it is reported that through studying the Holocaust, that there are Cambodians who deal with their own genocide organized by an Indiana teacher and a Cambodian scholar documenting the Khmer Rouge atrocities creating workshops for comparative genocide education in Battambang. Some also note both differences and similarities.

The comparisons continue that while there is Holocaust denial, there is also Cambodian genocide denial. Similarly, just as there were the Nuremberg Trials after the Holocaust, Jewish law experts have helped Cambodian genocide victims find justice at a tribunal in pursuing justice for Khmer Rouge war crimes, Jewish legal experts traverse the globe to assist, finding parallels between the Holocaust and the systematic massacre of 1.5 million Cambodians.

== Cambodia–Israel relations ==
Cambodia and Israel established diplomatic ties in 1960 In 1972, Cambodia opened its embassy in Israel in Jerusalem. However, Israel cut its ties with Cambodia in 1975 due to the rise of the Khmer Rouge regime. Ties were restored in 1993.
