= History of the Jews in Macau =

The history of the Jews in Macau can be divided into three distinct periods: Starting from 1557 during the times when it was Portuguese Macau that saw the arrival of Crypto-Jews who were victims of the Portuguese Inquisition. During the time before and during the Holocaust (1937–1945) when hundreds of Jewish refugees settled in Macau for short periods of time to escape antisemitism. Then from 1999 when Macau became one of the special administrative regions of China and its fame as the "gambling capital of the world" with Jewish entrepreneurs such as Sheldon Adelson who invested in Macau. In addition there is a flow of Jewish and Israeli travelers in and out of Macau all the time but there is no active synagogue and kosher food needs to be brought from Hong Kong.

== Crypto Jews and their role in Macau ==
Crypto-Jews, also known as marranos or conversos, of Portuguese origin settled in Macau after fleeing the Inquisition in Portugal. They were active in Macau during the sixteenth and seventeenth centuries. These Crypto-Jews were merchants and they played a major role in early trade networks across Asia. They had reached the far eastern edge of the Portuguese trading world as merchants, and occasionally came to the attention of the Inquisition. A Crypto-Jew/New Christian who surfaces in Macau belongs to the same Lisbon-rooted merchant world as the conversos of Goa, Malacca, Manila and Nagasaki, and almost always connects back to Portugal and to the great trading families of Portuguese India. Crypto-Jews/New Christian merchant capital was central to Portuguese India and the Crown's Asian trade, across the Habsburg period of 1580 to 1640: From Lisbon in Portugal to Goa, Malacca, Macau, Nagasaki. Macau's distance from Goa, its lack of a resident tribunal, and its dependence on merchant money gave it a reputation as a place where a family of converso descent might trade with less scrutiny than in Portugal itself.

=== Leonor (Lianor) da Fonseca ===
Leonor da Fonseca (born 1567) a resident of Macau was arrested by the Portuguese Inquisition in 1594 and sent to Goa for trial. She came under suspicion for who her family was: her father was a New Christian, and a sister had earlier been arrested on the same grounds. She was married to an Old Christian, Marçal Fernandez. The testimony against her did not fit the standard checklist of “Jewish ceremonies” that recurs in Portuguese trials; the substance of it concerned her perceived immorality, poor church attendance, and recourse to popular healing magic, with the one clearly religious charge being that she rested on Saturdays (the Jewish Shabbat) and worked on Sundays. She refused to confess the formal renunciation required where suspicion was strong but due to incomplete proof, she served a short detention, and freed in 1595 or 1596.

== Pre-Holocaust and Holocaust Jewish refugees ==
A few hundred Jewish refugees fleeing the Holocaust left Japanese-occupied Shanghai looking for safety in neutral, Portuguese-administered Macau. Macau served as a stepping stone and offered travel links via Lisbon to ultimate freedom in the United States or Britain. Many of the refugees were younger adults who wanted a chance at a transatlantic escape. Portugal remained neutral therefore Macau was spared direct Japanese military occupation during much of the war. Unlike Shanghai, Macau had no established synagogue or formal organized Jewish community structure, making religious life difficult.

The British author Paul French in 2016 published Strangers on the Praia about this subject and put a lot of research into a piece published in Cha: An Asian Literary Journal. He notes: "I think the whole Jewish refugee experience in Macao has been forgotten largely, certainly against the larger tales of defeat and internment in Hong Kong and the recollections of the Shanghai Ghetto in the war, so I hope this resurrects some interest in this footnote to the refugee experience in the conflict."

== Special administrative region of China ==
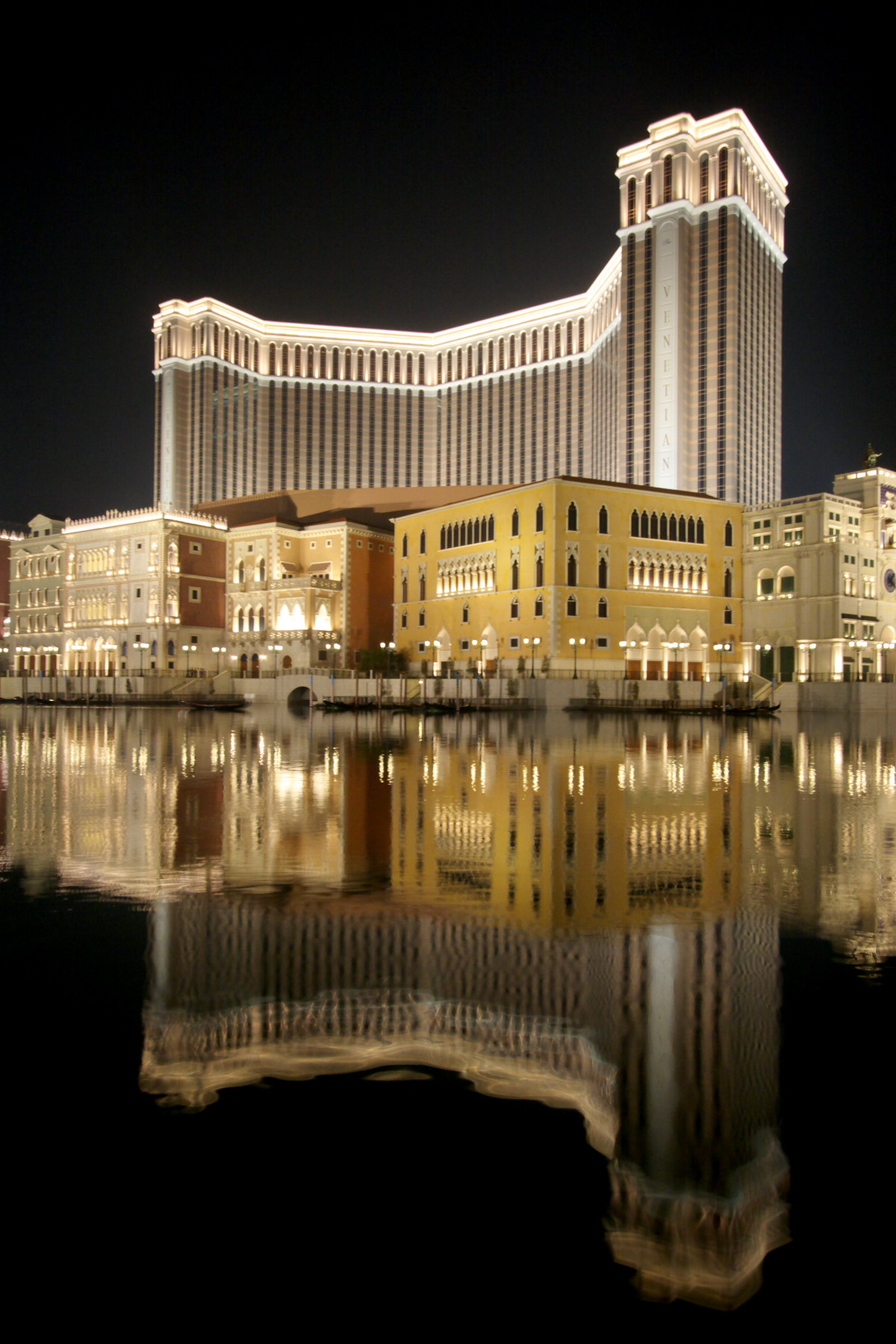
The Venetian Macau, the seventh-largest building in the world by floor space

The Jewish pro-Israel and pro-Trump gambling entrepreneur Sheldom Adelson (1933–2021) invested heavily in modern Macau's gambling industry. Adelson led a project to bring Las Vegas Sands casinos to Macau. The 1,000,000 square feet (93,000 m^{2}) Sands Macao became China's first Las Vegas-style casino when it opened in May 2004. He recovered his initial $265-million investment in one year and, because he owned 69% of the stock, he increased his wealth when he took the stock public in December 2004. Following the opening of the Sands Macao, Adelson's personal wealth supposedly multiplied more than fourteen times.

In August 2007, Adelson opened the $2.4 billion Venetian Macao Resort Hotel on Cotai and announced that he planned to create a massive, concentrated resort area he called the Cotai Strip, after its Las Vegas counterpart. Adelson said that he planned to open more hotels under brands such as Four Seasons, Sheraton, and St. Regis. His Las Vegas Sands planned to invest $12 billion and build 20,000 hotel rooms on the Cotai Strip by 2010.

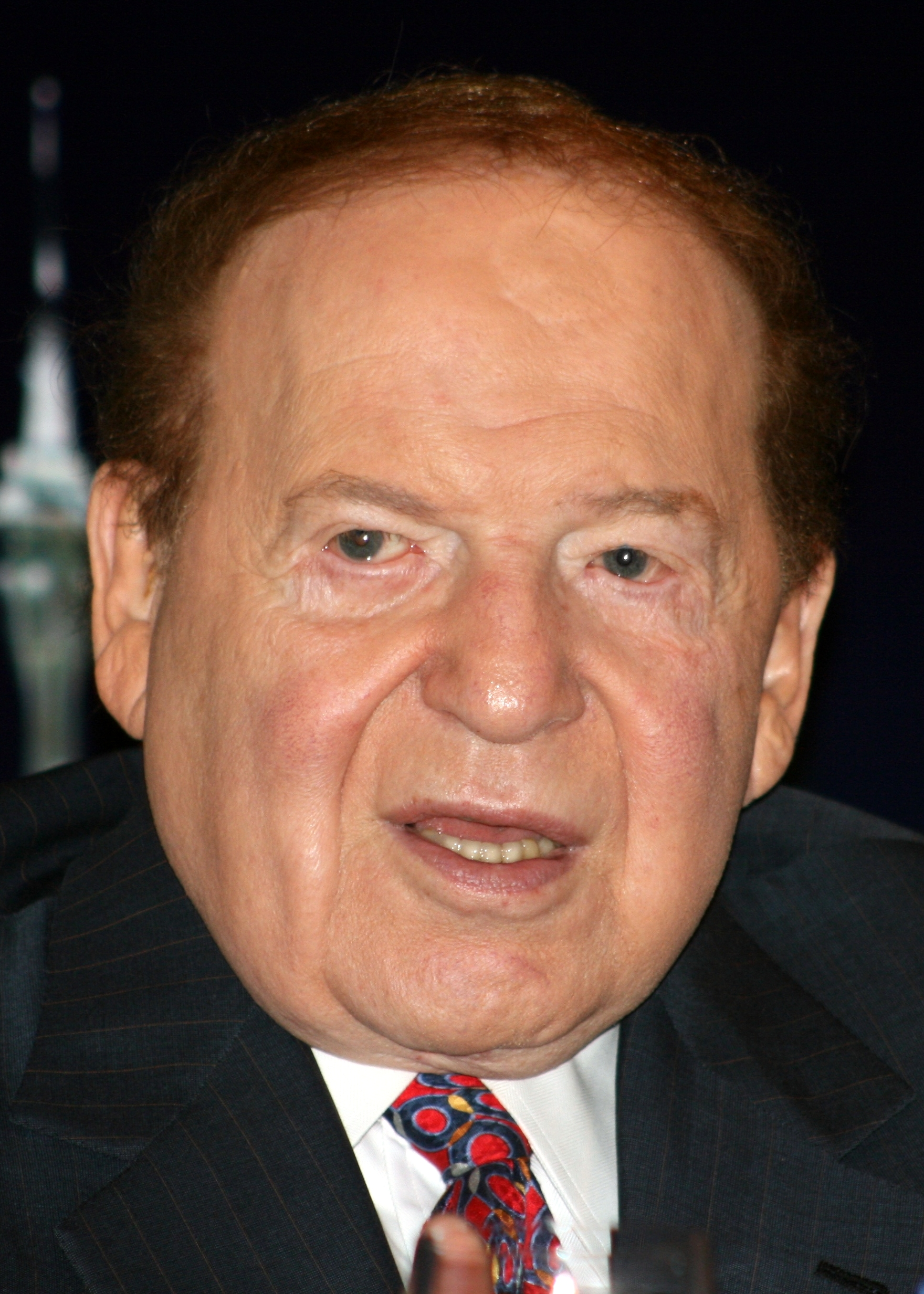
Sheldon Adelson (1933–2021)

Adelson's company was reportedly under federal investigation over alleged violations of the Foreign Corrupt Practices Act relating to payments made to a Macau lawyer. In 2015, Sands agreed to pay a $9 million settlement with the Securities and Exchange Commission, which included no admission of wrongdoing.

Upon Sheldon Adelson's passing his stakes in the Macau casinos were transferred to his wife Miriam Adelson and family.

== See also ==
- History of the Jews in China
- History of the Jews in Portugal
- History of the Jews in Shanghai
- History of the Jews in Hong Kong
- History of the Jews in Goa

== Outside links ==
- Strangers on the Praia by Paul French
