= List of Caribbean Jews =

Here is a list of some prominent Caribbean Jews, arranged by country of origin.

== Antigua and Barbuda ==
- Jamaica Kincaid (1949-), writer, converted to Judaism

== Aruba ==
- Henny Eman (1949-2025), Prime Minister
- Mike Eman (1961-), Prime Minister

== Cuba ==
- Ruth Behar (1956-), writer
- José Antonio Bowen (1962-), jazz musician and president of Goucher College
- Fabio Grobart (1905-1994), Communist Party co-founder
- Olga Guillot (1922-2010), singer
- José Miller (1925-2006), leader of the Cuban Jewish community
- Meyer Rosenbaum (1910-1997), Rabbi and spiritual leader
- William Levy (1980-), actor in American film & TV, quarter Jewish

== Curaçao ==
- Rebecca Cohen Henriquez (1864-1935), philanthropist
- George Maduro (1916-1940),
- Daniel De Leon (1852-1940), socialist leader

== Dominican Republic ==
- Oscar Haza (1954-), journalist
- Francisco Henríquez y Carvajal (1859-1935), Dominican President
- Pedro Henríquez Ureña (1884-1946), academic and writer

== Guyana ==
- Janet Jagan (1920-2009), née Rosenberg, president (1997–99)

== Haiti ==
- Eric André (1983-), actor, comedian, and television host, dual American citizen star of The Eric Andre Show & Bad Trip
- Gilbert Bigio (1935-2026), businessman billionaire of Syrian descent and Israeli honorary consul in Haiti
- Luis de Torres (-1493), one of the first Jews to settle on Haiti, and also Christopher Columbus's interpreter
- Monique Péan (1981-), fine jewelry designer
- Sol (1988-), hip hop musician

== Jamaica ==
- Ivan Barrow (1911-1979), cricketer who played 11 Tests for the West Indies.
- Chris Blackwell (1937-), founder of Island Records
- Jacob De Cordova (1808-1868), the founder of the Jamaica Gleaner
- Cecil Vernon Lindo (1870-1962) Jamaican banker and industrialist
- Leander de Cordova (1877-1969), Jamaican-born actor and film director, grandnephew of Jacob de Cordova
- Rudolph de Cordova (1860-1941), a Jamaican-born British writer, screenwriter and actor.
- Lewis Gordon (1962-), philosopher
- Isaac Mendes Belisario (1795-1849), artist
- Oscar Levis (1898-1983), baseball pitcher in the Negro leagues from 1921 to 1931.
- Sean Paul (1973-), singer, quarter Jewish
- Frank Silvera (1914-1970), actor in American film & TV Killer's Kiss & Hombre, founder of Theatre of Being, half Jewish
- Louis Simpson (1923-2012), poet, half Jewish
- Yehoshua Sofer (1958-), Jamaican-born Israeli hip hop and rap artist, also a martial artist & trainer.

== Puerto Rico ==
- Quiara Alegría Hudes (1977-), author, playwright. Wrote the book for Broadway's musical In the Heights. Her play, Elliot, a Soldier's Fugue, was a Pulitzer Prize finalist in 2007.
- Sandy Alomar Sr. (1943-), Baseball player, father was Jewish but an agnostic who allowed his children to be brought up as a Catholic
- Axel Anderson (1929-2012), German-born actor/director, Anderson made his debut in Puerto Rican television with a sitcom named Qué Pareja a local version of I Love Lucy.
- David Blaine (1978-), magician, Blaine is also an endurance artist and Guinness Book of Records world record-holder, American born, half Jewish.
- Mathias Brugman (1811-1866), was a leader in Puerto Rico's independence revolution against Spain known as El Grito de Lares (Lares' Cry), half Jewish
- Julio Kaplan (1950-), Argentina-born chess player and former world junior champion.
- Raphy Leavitt (1948-2015), composer, director and founder of "La Selecta"
- Ari Meyers (1969-), actress, Best known for her role as Emma Jane McArdle in the Kate & Allie (1984) TV series, born but not raised in Puerto Rico
- Joaquin Phoenix (1974-), actor, won Best Actor Oscar (for Joker), was nominated for the Academy Award for Best Supporting Actor, Gladiator in 2000 and in 2005, he was nominated for the Best Actor Oscar, and won a Golden Globe in the same category in 2006 for his role as Johnny Cash in Walk the Line.
- Geraldo Rivera (1943-), journalist, half Jewish New York City born
- Jorge Seijo (1942-) Puerto Rican radio and television personality
- A. Cecil Snyder (1907-1959) Chief Justice of the Supreme Court of Puerto Rico, continual US born

== Suriname ==
- Edgar Davids (1973-), footballer (Jewish grandmother)
- Jacques Judah Lyons (1814-1877), rabbi, later immigrated to the United States of America
- Pim de la Parra (1940-), film maker

== US Virgin Islands ==
- Gabriel Milan (1631-1689), Governor of the Danish West Indies (U.S. Virgin Islands)
- Judah Benjamin (1811-1844), US and Confederate politician
- Ralph Moses Paiewonsky (1907-1991), businessman, politician and governor
- Camille Pissarro (1830-1903), artist
- David Levy Yulee (1810-1866), US politician

== See also ==
- List of Jews
- List of Jamaicans
