= History of the Jews in Southern Africa =

History of the Jews in Southern Africa: The article is ordered alphabetically and divided by country. There is no single agreed definition of Southern Africa; various definitions include:

- The United Nations geoscheme for Africa
- The intergovernmental Southern African Development Community
- The physical geography definition/s based on the physical characteristics of the land

The most restrictive definition considers the region to consist of Botswana, Eswatini, Lesotho, Namibia, and South Africa.

== Angola ==
The recorded history of the Jews in Angola stretches from the Middle Ages to modern times. A very small community of Jews lives in Angola mostly in the capital city of Luanda with a handful scattered elsewhere of mixed origins and backgrounds. There are also a number of transitory Israeli businesspeople living in Angola. Historians record that there are a number of cases of Portuguese New Christians, such as Gaspar de Robles, Manuel Alvarez Pricto, testifying in the Americas that they were introduced to "Judaizing" by relatives and friends while in Angola, many attesting they were introduced to the "Law of Moses" in Angola.

There was a suggestion to create a Jewish "colony" or agricultural settlement in the Portuguese colony of Angola for Russian and Romanian Jews in the early 1900s. There was a prior proposal to set up a Jewish settlement in 1886 by the Alliance Juive Universelle encouraged by the Portuguese Jew S.A. Anahory. These efforts did not come to fruition. Another failed effort was the so-called "Angola Plan" with attempts from 1907 to 1913 by the Jewish Territorial Organization, under the influence of Israel Zangwill in Britain, to set up an autonomous Jewish entity somewhere in West Africa with Angola as a strong possibility. After 1910, Portugal's new republican leaders proposed Angola for Jewish colonization as both a practical solution to increasing the white population and to win support from liberal Jewish circles. By June 1912 the Portuguese chamber of deputies passed the final version of a bill to authorize concessions to Jewish settlers, clearly indicating Portugal's desire to use Jewish immigration to consolidate its hold over Angola. No financial support was offered and by 1913, many officials of the Jewish Territorial Organization in London turned against it in favor of settling Palestine. Another failed suggestion to settle Jews from Eastern Europe in Angola resurfaced in 1934.

== Botswana ==
The history of the Jews in Botswana is relatively modern and centered in the city of Gaborone. Most Jews in Botswana are Israelis and South Africans. In 1938, with the rise of Nazism in Europe, the colonial authorities in Botswana then known as Bechuanaland, South Africa, and Great Britain attempted to resettle some Jewish refugees in Botswana to leverage their capital and agricultural skills to help improve the territory's struggling economy. However, the outbreak of the Second World War in 1939 abruptly ended these efforts.

In 1994, the Botswana Jewish community drafted a constitution and created its first committee. Rabbi Moshe Silberhaft, spiritual leader to the African Jewish Congress, made a special visit to Gaborone to participate in the meeting where it was decided to call the community the Jewish Community of Botswana.

== Eswatini ==
Figures from 2017 Eswatini official census suggested that there are an estimated 163 Jews in the country. Before and during the Holocaust, Swaziland, as Eswatini was then called, welcomed a large group of German Jewish refugees who lived there for a few years.

In 2002, Swaziland's prime minister, Barnabas Dlamini, said the country appreciates the contribution of its Jewish community: "The Jewish community is small, numbering in the tens rather than hundreds, but over the years it has had quite an influence on the development of our country, the names Kirsh and Goldblatt will be remembered long after their time" referring to two well-known Jewish Swazi entrepreneurs. Kalman Goldblatt who later changed his name to Kal Grant came from Lithuania and built his wealth through several trading stores and by developing the first townships in the country.

== Lesotho ==
The history of the Jewish presence in Lesotho dates back to the Second Boer War of 1864–1865, when a German-Jewish immigrant named Moritz Leviseur fought for the Free State forces that invaded the country. During Lesotho's colonial period, some European Jews settled in Lesotho. Following World War II, Jewish refugees from Nazi Europe temporarily increased the Jewish population. Since World War II, most Jews living in Lesotho have lived there temporarily for business purposes. However, in 1999, Lesotho's Jewish community sent a delegate to the Commonwealth Jewish Congress conference in London. The World Jewish Congress has reported that only a handful of Jewish people in Lesotho belong to the Lesotho Jewish Community, which is affiliated with the Congress. Almost all Lesotho Jews live in the capital city of Maseru.

In 2005 King Letsie III of Lesotho hosted a delegation of the African Jewish Congress (AJC) at his royal palace in Maseru. The AJC, which operates under the auspices of the South African Jewish Board of Deputies, acts as a coordinating representative body for the Jewish communities of Southern Africa. The delegation comprised Rabbi Moshe Silberhaft, spiritual leader to the AJC, and long-time Maseru resident Yehuda Danziger.

== Malawi ==
Press reports of the time state that during World War II (1939–1945), 60 Polish-Jewish families went to Nyasaland, then under British colonial rule and today known as modern day Malawi, arriving via Iran to escape the Holocaust. After the war, however, most of these Polish Jews left the area. By 1959, only twelve Jews were living in Malawi. In 1941 as German forces neared Cyprus 270 Jews were subsequently shipped to Nyasaland and Tanganyika by the British. An eyewitness report states that "a hundred" Jewish refugees from Cyprus were shipped via Palestine to Nyasaland during World War II.

Malawi and Israel established diplomatic relations with each other in July 1964 and have since continued. Malawi under prime minister Hastings Banda's (1898–1997) foreign policy was one of only three Sub-Saharan African countries (the others being Lesotho and Swaziland (since 2018 renamed to Eswatini) that continued to maintain full diplomatic relations with Israel after the Yom Kippur War in 1973. Israel has assisted Malawi with a few social and economic development programs. Post Banda Israel continues a relationship with Malawi on a non-residential basis.

== Mozambique ==
The history of the Jews in Mozambique, until 1975, was closely connected with the history of Judaism through the former Portuguese Empire, particularly those elements of it operating on the coastlines of the Indian Ocean. By the late 15th century, Jewish merchants and persons connected with sea work had lived on, and next to, this ocean for many centuries. As a European presence deepened by the late 19th century in the Portuguese East African colonial capital then called "Lourenço Marques", a cluster of Jews of diverse backgrounds were living there.

In 2010 the Jewish community of Maputo officially reorganized as "Honen Dalim: The Jewish Community of Mozambique" (Associação Honen Dalim - Comunidade Judaica de Moçambique). The original synagogue underwent a complete renovation in 2013. It currently hosts weekly services and events for the Jewish community of Mozambique, attracting permanent residents and guests from around the world. The number in the Jewish community was reported to be 35 in 2018, and described as "thriving."

== Namibia ==
The history of the Jews in Namibia, formerly South West Africa and before that German South West Africa, goes back one and a half centuries. Jews played an important if minor role in the history of Namibia since that point in time, despite their continuous small population.The most famous Namibian Jew was "businessman, philanthropist and Jewish communal leader" Harold Pupkewitz (1915–2012).

The Jewish population in Namibia dramatically declined since 1965, with only 60 to 100 Jews living in Namibia today. Despite this extremely low number of Jews, Windhoek "has a Hebrew congregation dating from 1917, a synagogue built in 1925, a Talmud Torah, a communal hall, an active Zionist movement supported by generous contributions, and the only Jewish minister in the territory." Other than at Windhoek, the only other place in Namibia today where Jews live in is Keetmanshoop, where about twelve Jewish families currently live.

== South Africa ==
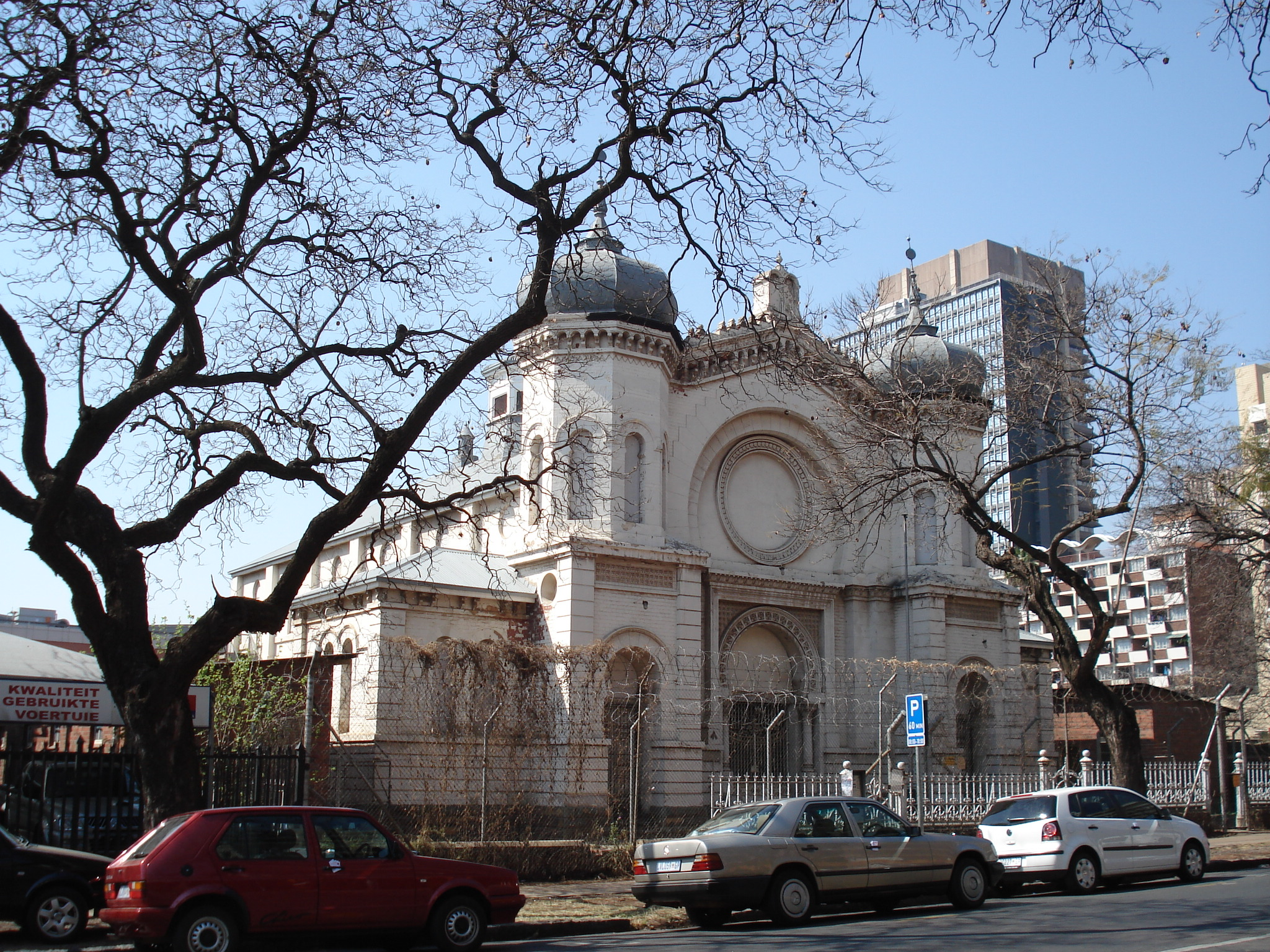
The Old Synagogue in Pretoria.

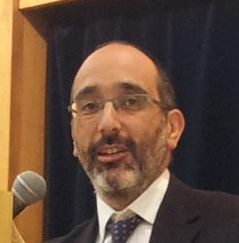
Chief Rabbi of South Africa Warren Goldstein.

Rabbi Warren Goldstein.jpgSouth African Jews, whether by culture, ethnicity, or religion, form the twelfth largest Jewish community in the world, and the largest on the African continent. As of 2020, the Kaplan Centre at the University of Cape Town estimates 52,300 Jews in the country. The South African Jewish Board of Deputies estimates that the figure is closer to 75,000. As of 2026, the Jewish Agency for Israel estimates that the figure is 61,000.

Although the Jewish community peaked in the 1970s at around 120,000 people,) about 52,000 Jews, mostly nominally Orthodox, remain in South Africa. A proportion are secular, or have converted to Christianity. Despite low intermarriage rates (around 7%), approximately 1,800 Jews emigrate every year, mainly to Israel, Australia, Canada, and the United States. The Jewish community in South Africa is currently the largest in Africa, and, although shrinking due to emigration, it remains one of the most nominally Orthodox communities in the world, although there is a smaller Progressive community, especially in Cape Town. The nation's Progressive communities are represented by the South African Union for Progressive Judaism. The current Orthodox Chief Rabbi, Warren Goldstein (2008), has been widely credited for initiating a "Bill of Responsibilities" which the government has incorporated in the national school curriculum. The Chief Rabbi has also pushed for community run projects to combat crime in the country.

== Zambia ==
The history of the Jews in Zambia goes back to the early 1900s. Jews were always a small community with a notable role in Zambian history. The history of the Jews in Zambia dates to 1901 when it was still under British Colonial rule. Northern Rhodesia was colonized in the 1890s by the British South Africa Company, otherwise known as BSAC. Initially, Northern Rhodesia was split into North-eastern and North-western Rhodesia. However, the BSAC united them in 1911 to form Northern Rhodesia, which has its capital in Livingstone. Among the population of 1 million people, there were 1,500 white residents in Northern Rhodesia, of whom many were the Jewish settlers.

Many Jews came to Zambia in order to achieve economic prosperity, first settling in Livingstone and Broken Hill. Some of the first Jews in Zambia were prominent in cattle production and the copper mining businesses. Livingstone already had a permanent Jewish congregation of 38 members by 1905, with the first Jewish wedding in Zambia taking place in 1910. Many Zambian Jews achieved great success in the ranching industry and in the iron foundries. 110 Jews lived in Zambia (with a majority of them living in Livingstone and Lusaka) in 1921, and this population increased over the next decades.Some Jewish refugees came to Zambia before and after the Holocaust, with the Jewish population of Zambia peaking at 1,000 to 1,200 in the mid-1950s by which point "the center of Jewish life had shifted to Lusaka, the copperbelt center of the country". Many Jews left Zambia and immigrated to other countries in the 1960s, with only 600 Jews remaining in Zambia in 1968. Jews were active and prominent in Zambian politics before Zambia became independent in 1964. The Council for Zambia Jewry was created in Lusaka in 1978 "to oversee Jewish communal activities." This council also "provides assistance to political refugees and the poverty-stricken with medical and financial aid."Only about thirty-five Jews currently live in Zambia, with almost all of them living in Lusaka. The Zambian Jewish community did not have a rabbi for several years by this point in time.

== Zimbabwe ==
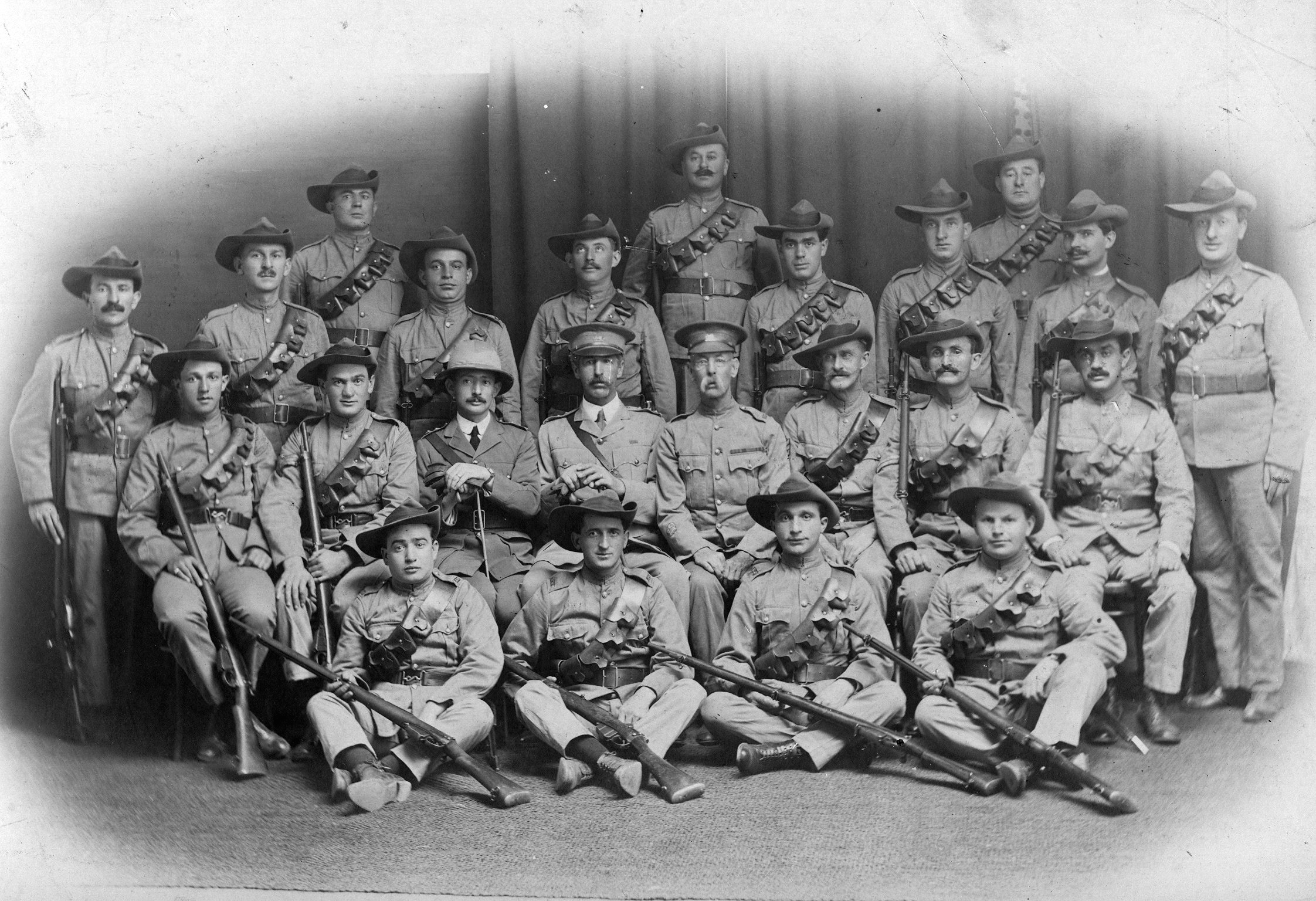
A group of Jewish volunteers in the Rhodesian Reserves during the First World War, pictured having just won an inter-sectional shooting competition in May 1916.

The history of the Jews in Zimbabwe reaches back to the 19th century. Present-day Zimbabwe was formerly known as Southern Rhodesia and later as Rhodesia. The community peaked in 1961, numbering 7,060. During the 19th century, Ashkenazi Jews from the Russian Empire and Lithuania settled in Rhodesia after the area had been colonized by the British, and became active in the trading industry. In 1894, the first synagogue was established in a tent in Bulawayo. The second community developed in Salisbury, (later renamed Harare) in 1895. A third congregation was established in Gwelo in 1901. By 1900, approximately 300 Jews lived in Rhodesia.

In the 1930s a number of Sephardic Jews arrived in Rhodesia from the Greek island of Rhodes and mainly settled in Salisbury. This was followed by another wave in the 1960s when Jews fled the Belgian Congo. A Sephardic Jewish Community Synagogue was established in Salisbury in the 1950s.

In the late 1930s, German Jews fleeing Nazi persecution settled in the colony. In 1943, the Rhodesian Zionist Council and the Rhodesian Jewish Board of Deputies were established, later being renamed the Central African Zionist Council and Central African Board of Jewish Deputies in 1946. After World War II, Jewish immigrants arrived from South Africa and the United Kingdom. By 1961, the Jewish population peaked at 7,060. Some Jews chose to stay behind when the country was transferred to black majority rule and renamed Zimbabwe in 1980. However, emigration continued, and by 1987, 1,200 Jews out of a peak population of about 7,000 remained. Most Rhodesian Jews emigrated to Israel or South Africa, seeking better economic conditions and Jewish marriage prospects. Until the late 1990s, rabbis resided in Harare and Bulawayo, but left as the economy and community began to decline. Today there is no resident rabbi.

== See also ==
- History of the Jews in Africa

=== Regions: ===
- History of the Jews in Central Africa
- History of the Jews in East Africa
- History of the Jews in North Africa
- History of the Jews in West Africa

=== Countries: ===
- History of the Jews in the Democratic Republic of the Congo
- History of the Jews in Madagascar
- History of the Jews in Mauritius
- History of the Jews in Seychelles
- History of the Jews in Tanzania
