= History of the Jews in Central Africa =

History of the Jews in Central Africa: The article is ordered alphabetically and divided by country. There is no single agreed definition of Central Africa; various definitions include:

- The United Nations geoscheme for Africa consists of Angola, Cameroon, Central African Republic, Chad, Democratic Republic of the Congo, Republic of the Congo, Equatorial Guinea, Gabon, and São Tomé and Príncipe.
- The United Nations Office for Central Africa (UNOCA) also covers Burundi and Rwanda, although both are classified under East Africa in the geoscheme. These eleven countries are or were members of the Economic Community of Central African States (ECCAS).
- Six of the UNOCA countries (Cameroon, Central African Republic, Chad, Equatorial Guinea, Gabon, and Republic of the Congo) are also members of the Economic Community of Central African States (CEMAC). The Economic Community of Central African States state, are part of the UN's Middle Africa label.
- The African Development Bank, on the other hand, defines Central Africa as seven countries: Cameroon, Central African Republic, Chad, Republic of the Congo, Democratic Republic of Congo, Equatorial Guinea, and Gabon.

== Angola ==
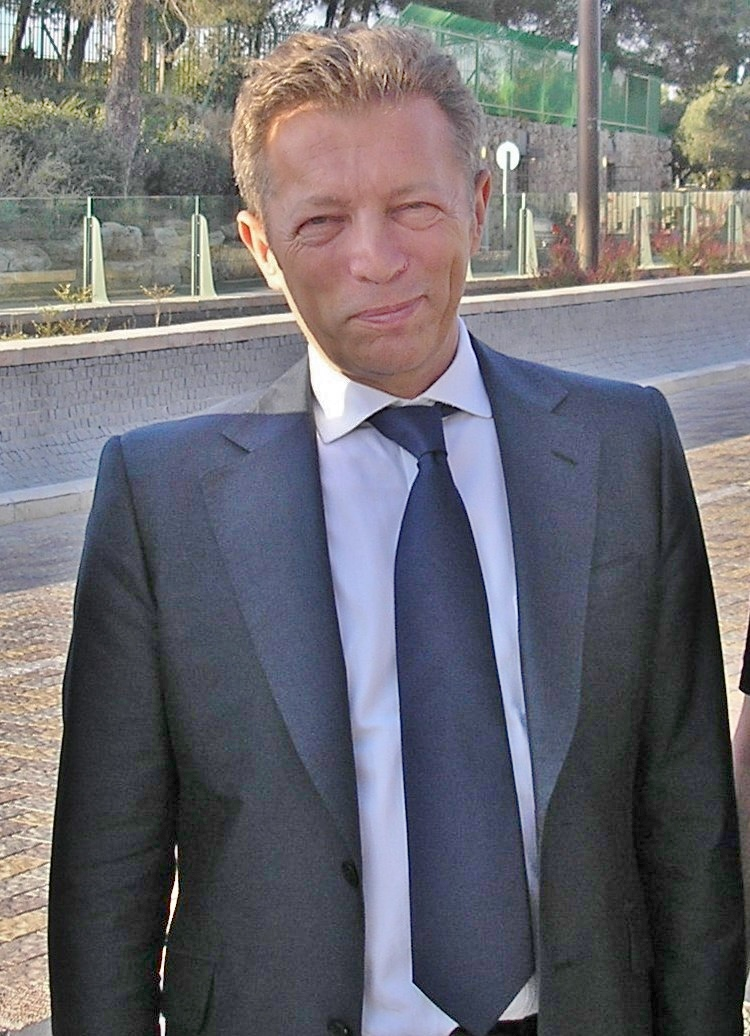
"Luanda Made Arcadi Gaydamak a Billionaire and a Diplomat" (Haaretz)

The history of the Jews in Angola stretches from the Middle Ages to modern times. A very small community of Jews lives in Angola mostly in the capital city of Luanda with a handful scattered elsewhere of mixed origins and backgrounds. There are also a number of transitory Israeli businesspeople living in Angola.

Some historians claim that Paulo Dias de Novais (1510–1589), a grandson of Bartholomew Dias was a "Jewish" (probably meaning "Crypto-Jewish" or a Converso of some sort) colonizer who became "Lord-Proprietor" of Angola in 1571 who brought Jewish artisans to Luanda where a so-called "clandestine rabbi" was conducting services in a secret Luanda synagogue. By the late eighteenth century more Jews arrived and a community was functioning in Dondo. There are a number of cases of Portuguese New Christians, such as Gaspar de Robles, Manuel Alvarez Pricto, testifying in the Americas that they were introduced to "Judaizing" by relatives and friends while in Angola, many attesting they were introduced to the "Law of Moses" in Angola.

There was a suggestion to create a Jewish "colony" or agricultural settlement in the Portuguese colony of Angola for Russian and Romanian Jews in the early 1900s. There was a prior proposal to set up a Jewish settlement in 1886 by the Alliance Juive Universelle encouraged by the Portuguese Jew S.A. Anahory. These efforts did not come to fruition. Another failed effort was the so-called "Angola Plan" with attempts from 1907 to 1913 by the Jewish Territorial Organization, under the influence of Israel Zangwill in Britain, to set up an autonomous Jewish entity somewhere in West Africa with Angola as a strong possibility. After 1910, Portugal's new republican leaders proposed Angola for Jewish colonization as both a practical solution to increasing the white population and to win support from liberal Jewish circles. By June 1912 the Portuguese chamber of deputies passed the final version of a bill to authorize concessions to Jewish settlers, clearly indicating Portugal's desire to use Jewish immigration to consolidate its hold over Angola. No financial support was offered and by 1913, many officials of the Jewish Territorial Organization in London turned against it in favor of settling Palestine. Another failed suggestion to settle Jews from Eastern Europe in Angola resurfaced in 1934.

In a 2006 article titled "Luanda Made Him a Billionaire and a Diplomat" in the Israeli newspaper Haaretz, it was reported that Arcadi Gaydamak was "one of the most influential business people in Angola and one of the closest to the corridors of power with ties to president Jose Eduardo dos Santos and dos Santos' daughter businesswoman Isabel dos Santos, generals and high-ranking police officers trace back several years." According to this report the close relationship garnered Gaydamak an Angolan diplomatic passport, as well as French, Canadian, Russian and Israeli citizenship and holding a "title" in the Angolan embassy in Moscow. Angola turned him into a billionaire estimated at $3 billion in an interview with Haaretz. Flying the new president of the state-owned Russian rough diamond exporter Alrosa to Luanda to introduce him to dos Santos.

== Cameroon ==
The history of the Jews in Cameroon is obscure and found in several legends and myths. Today the Jewish community in Cameroon is small, with a handful of mostly Israeli Jews living in the capital city of Yaoundé. According to the organization Kulanu, some Cameroonian tribes claim ancient Israelite descent. During the 1990s, some members of the Beth Yeshourun Pentecostal community decided to leave Christianity and become Jewish. Leaders of the Beth Yeshourun Jewish Community of Cameroon approached Kulanu, from whom they were provided with guidance and a Sefer Torah. The modern Jewish population in Cameroon lives close to the Israeli Embassy in Yaoundé. Services for Jewish holidays are held at the home of the Israeli ambassador, where kosher food can be found.

== Democratic Republic of the Congo ==
The history of the Jews in the Democratic Republic of the Congo can be traced back to 1907, when the first Jewish immigrants began to arrive in the country. The current Jewish Congolese population is mostly of Sephardi background. The first Jews in the Congo were Eastern European immigrants from Romania and Poland. Within the next few years, more Jewish immigrants arrived from South Africa. In 1911, Sephardi Jews came from the Island of Rhodes in what is now Greece (then part of the Ottoman Empire) settled in the Congo. A synagogue was built in Lubumbashi in 1930. Due to an economic crisis during the 1930s, most of the Eastern European Jews left the Congo. However, after the crisis had passed more Jews immigrated from Eastern Europe and were joined by Southern European Jews.

At the time of independence, Congo was home to 2,500 Jewish people. 50% of the Jewish population lived in Lubumbashi, while 70 Jewish families lived in Congo's capital Kinshasa. In 2013, the Jewish population was around 320 and was settled mostly in Lubumbashi. Most are Sephardi and speak Ladino. There is a synagogue in Lubumbashi that is served by a rabbi. There is also small Jewish community living in Kinshasa that is known as the Congrégation Israélite.

== Gabon ==
The history of the Jews in Gabon dates back to at least the 17th century, when certain African communities claimed to be Jewish in origin. The contemporary Jewish community in Gabon is small.

In the seventeenth century, a native African community claiming Jewish origins was first mentioned in 1777 and a more thorough description was provided by the scientific works which were produced by the German Loango Expedition of 1873–76. This community had no links with Jewish communities elsewhere and has now disappeared. The Jewish community in the region may have been of Iberian Sephardi origin. Some European maps from the 17th century designate the Loango coastline as the Gulf of the Jews, golfo do judeus or golfos dos judeos. According to the Moravian missionary Christian Georg Andreas Oldendorp, the Black Jewish community in the Loango region was established by Jews from São Tomé who had been expelled and that it was from this population of exiles that "the black Portuguese and the black Jews of Loango, who were despised even by the local black population, were descended."

Small Jewish communities composed of former Christians have developed in the towns of Bitam and Oyem. These communities practice Jewish customs, but do not yet have synagogues. These communities are located in northern Gabon near the border with Cameroon and are led by Pascal Meka Ngomo, a former Evangelical Christian leader who abandoned Christianity for Judaism. The community hung its first mezuzah in 2014.

== Republic of the Congo ==
The history of the Jews in the Republic of the Congo dates back to at least the 17th century, when Black communities claiming Jewish descent existed along the Congolese coastline. The contemporary Jewish community is small. According to a 2021 report from the United States Department of State, there was a small Jewish community in the Republic of the Congo and no reported instances of antisemitic acts. The Congolese Jewish community has no synagogue.

== São Tomé and Príncipe ==
The history of the Jews in São Tomé and Príncipe dates back to the late 1400s, when Portuguese Jews were expelled from Portugal. In 1496, King Manuel I of Portugal punished Portuguese Jews who refused to pay a head tax by deporting almost 2,000 Jewish children to São Tomé and Príncipe. The children ranged in age between 2 and 10. The children were forcefully converted, raised as Roman Catholics, and worked in the sugar trade and by the 18th century, the Jewish heritage on the islands had largely dissipated. A new community of Jews was established on the islands in the 19th and 20th centuries with the arrival of a small number of Jewish sugar and cocoa traders.

In contemporary São Tomé and Príncipe, there are no practicing Jews. However, living descendants of the Portuguese-Jewish children remain on the islands where they are visibly distinctive due to their lighter complexions. On July 12, 1995, an international conference was held on the islands' twentieth independence day to commemorate the Portuguese-Jewish children who were deported to the islands in the 15th century.

Some of the Jews of São Tomé and Príncipe later settled in the Kingdom of Loango, along the coasts of continental Africa in what is now Gabon, the Republic of the Congo, and the Cabinda Province of Angola.

== See also ==
- History of the Jews in Africa

=== Regions: ===
- History of the Jews in East Africa
- History of the Jews in North Africa
- History of the Jews in Southern Africa
- History of the Jews in West Africa
