= History of the Jews in East Africa =

History of the Jews in East Africa: The article is ordered alphabetically and divided by country. There is no single agreed definition of East Africa; various definitions include:

- The United Nations geoscheme for Africa that encompasses eighteen sovereign states and four territories, see the East Africa article.
- In a narrow sense, particularly in English speaking contexts, East Africa refers to the area comprising Kenya, Tanzania, and Uganda, largely due to their shared history of British administration and later cooperation through East African regional institutions.
- The Horn of Africa, which comprises Djibouti, Eritrea, Ethiopia, and Somalia, stands out as a distinct geopolitical entity within East Africa.
- The East African Community, an economic and political bloc, currently includes the Democratic Republic of the Congo, Somalia, Burundi, Kenya, Rwanda, South Sudan, Uganda and Tanzania. Notably, the African Great Lakes region overlaps significantly with these countries. Adjacent to these mainland territories are island nations and territories such as the Comoros, Mauritius, Seychelles, Réunion, Mayotte, and the Scattered Islands in the Indian Ocean. Sudan is also sometimes included due in part because it is a part of the eastern region in African Union (AU) and a member of the Common Market for Eastern and Southern Africa (COMESA) free trade area.
- The East Africa Protectorate, very similar in scope to modern-day Kenya.

== Djibouti ==
The Jews of Djibouti are classified as part of the wider Yemenite Jewish community similar to those in Eritrea and Aden. Originally settling in Obock, and finally Djibouti City, in the wake of the British succession of the Gulf of Tadjoura to the French in 1884. The vast majority of the community made aliyah to Israel in 1949.

== Eritrea ==
Eritrea, see also the Federation of Ethiopia and Eritrea, once had a small community of Yemenite Jews who arrived in the country after having been attracted by new commercial opportunities driven by Italian colonial expansion in the late 19th century. In 1906, the Asmara Synagogue was completed in Asmara, the capital. It includes a main sanctuary which can seat up to 200 people, classrooms, and a small Jewish cemetery. In the 1930s, the Jewish community was bolstered when many European Jews emigrated to Eritrea to escape Nazi persecution in Europe. In 1936, the governor of the province allocated funds for the construction of a synagogue in Asmara.

== Ethiopia ==
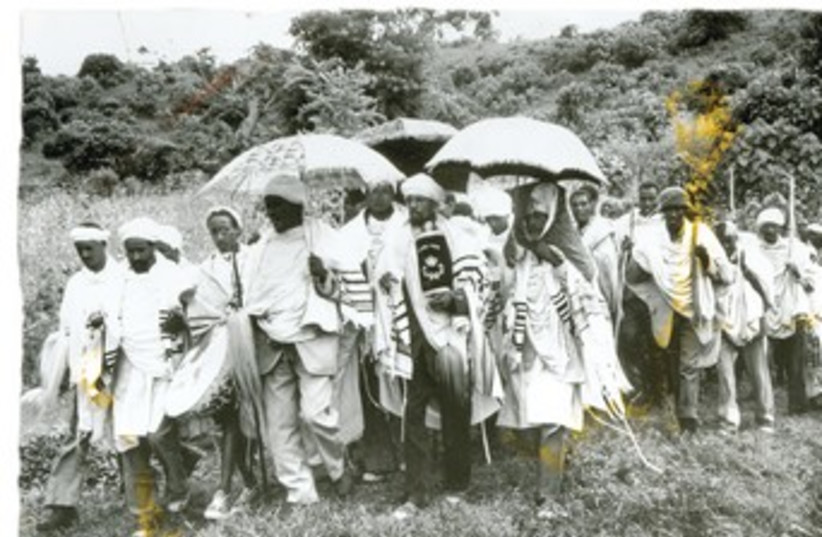
Beta Israel Jews in Ethiopia in the 1900s.

The history of the Jews in Ethiopia dates back millennia. The largest group in Ethiopia is the Beta Israel. Offshoots of the Beta Israel include the Beta Abraham and the Falash Mura. Addis Ababa is home to a small community of Adeni Jews. According to the Beta Israel tradition, the legendary Kingdom of Beta Israel, later called the Kingdom of Simien, was initially established after Ezana declared Christianity as the official religion of the Kingdom of Aksum. The inhabitants who practiced Judaism refused to convert to Christianity and began revolting; this group was referred to as "Beta Israel". Following a civil war between the Jewish population and the Christian population, the Beta Israel were said to have forged an independent state located in the Semien Mountains region and the Dembia region – situated to the north of Lake Tana and south of the Tekezé River. However, there is no evidence that directly support its existence, and its historicity is considered unlikely by scholars. Nothing in the historical record from the 6th to the 13th centuries, however, has allowed scholars to make anything more than very tentative hypotheses concerning the Jewish communities of that time.

Towards the mid-1980s, Ethiopia underwent a series of famines, exacerbated by adverse geopolitics and civil wars, which eventually resulted in the deaths of hundreds of thousands. As a result, the lives of hundreds of thousands of Ethiopians, including the Beta Israel community, became untenable and a large part tried to escape the war and the famine by fleeing to neighboring Sudan. Concern for the fate of the Ethiopian Jews and fear for their well-being contributed eventually to the Israeli government's official recognition of the Beta Israel community as Jews in 1975, for the purpose of the Law of Return. Civil war in Ethiopia prompted the Israeli government to airlift most of the Beta Israel population in Ethiopia to Israel in several covert military rescue operations which took place from the 1980s until the early 1990s.

== Kenya ==
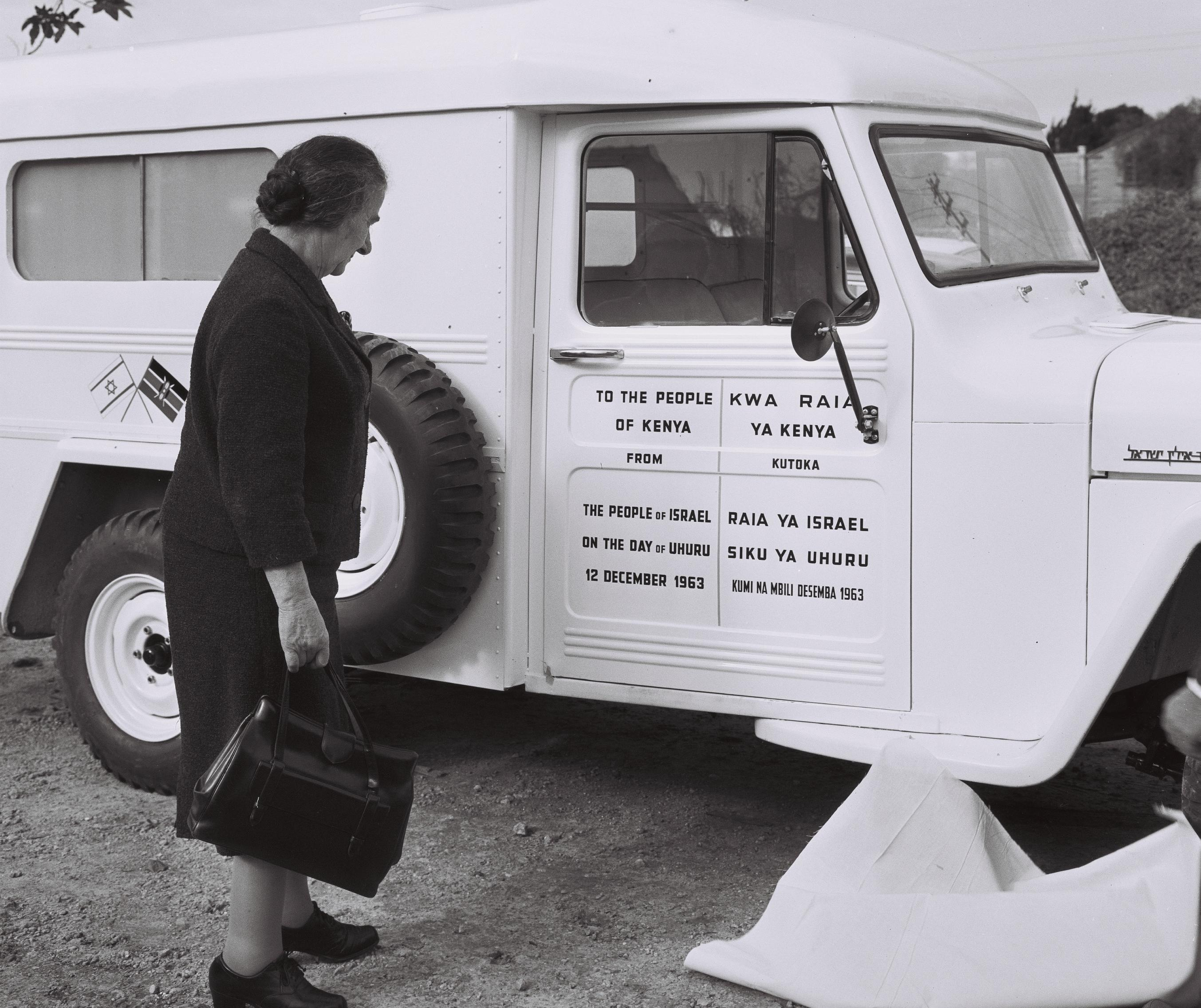
Israeli Foreign Minister Golda Meir with ambulance presented to Kernya on occasion of Kenya's independence celebration, 1963.

Jewish settlement in Kenya began in 1899. In 1903, British Colonial secretary Joseph Chamberlain proposed offering part of the territory in Kenya and Uganda, known as the British Uganda Programme, to the Zionists as an autonomous homeland at the Sixth Zionist Congress. The suggestion created much controversy among the international Jewish community and was rejected at the Seventh Zionist Congress in 1905. During the period of World War II and following the Holocaust, Jewish immigration increased, as many as 1,200 Jews came to live in the country.

== Somalia ==
There is evidence of a Jewish presence in the Somalia for centuries, with some members of the community openly practicing their faith and others practicing in secret. Many of the Jews in the area were Adenite and Yemenite Jews, who came to the region as merchants and religious service providers. However, a report in 1949 states that there were "no Jews left in Italian and British Somaliland". While the traditional Jewry in Somalia is known, little is known about the crypto-Jews who practice their faith discreetly.

Judaism has a rich history in the Somali peninsula, with both Ethiopian and southern Arabian strains present in the region. While there is limited evidence of any Somali clans embracing Judaism during the pre-Islamic era, the conversion of individuals and families cannot be ruled out. The Hebrew heritage of marginalized Somali clans, including the Yibir, can be traced back to the Beta Israel, or Ethiopian Jews. By the 16th century, the Somali population had largely adopted Islam as their primary religion.

== Sudan ==
The history of the Jews in Sudan goes back to a small community of Jews who lived there from about 1885 to around 1970. Most of the community left for Israel or Europe after antisemitic attacks began to spread against both the Jews in Israel and those still living in Sudan. There were eight Sephardi Jewish families in 1885 living in Omdurman in Sudan, under Turkish and Egyptian rule. The origins of these families and how they settled in Sudan is largely unknown. During Mahdist rule, the Jewish community was forcibly converted to Islam. When the British arrived in 1898, there were 36 people who declared themselves to be Jewish in Sudan. After Anglo-Egyptian rule had been established, six of the formerly Jewish families who had been forcibly converted to Islam reverted to Judaism.

As antisemitism intensified, many members of the community began to leave Sudan for Israel (via Greece), the United States, and European countries. Israel and Switzerland were the primary destinations of emigrating Sudanese Jews. Much of the community had left by 1960. In 1967, following the Six-Day War, there was a mass arrest of Jewish men and antisemitic attacks appeared in Sudanese newspapers advocating the torture and murder of prominent Jewish community leaders. Jewish emigration subsequently intensified, with the vast majority of Jews still in the country soon leaving. The last remaining Jews in Sudan left the country in the early 1970s. Overall, about 500 Sudanese Jews immigrated to Israel while the rest went to other countries.

== Tanzania ==
The history of the Jews in Tanzania, formerly known as Tanganyika, dates back at least to the 1880s, when Yemenite, Ethiopian, and Omani Jews arrived in the country today known as Tanzania. A later influx of Polish and German Jews settled in Tanzania between the 1930s and the 1950s, fleeing persecution in Nazi Europe. A Jewish community has existed in the city of Arusha for over a century. The Jewish community of Arusha was founded by Yemenite Jews in the 1880s. Moroccan, Omani, and Ethiopian Jews also settled in Arusha. Some Yemenites from Zanzibar also later moved to Arusha. During the 1930s, around 5,000 Polish Jews fleeing Nazi persecution joined the Arusha Jewish community. The community began to disperse during the 1960s. Political and economic instability following Tanzania's independence in 1961 motivated many Tanzanian Jews to leave the country. Some Jews who remained practiced Judaism in secret or joined the Maasai people.

== Uganda ==
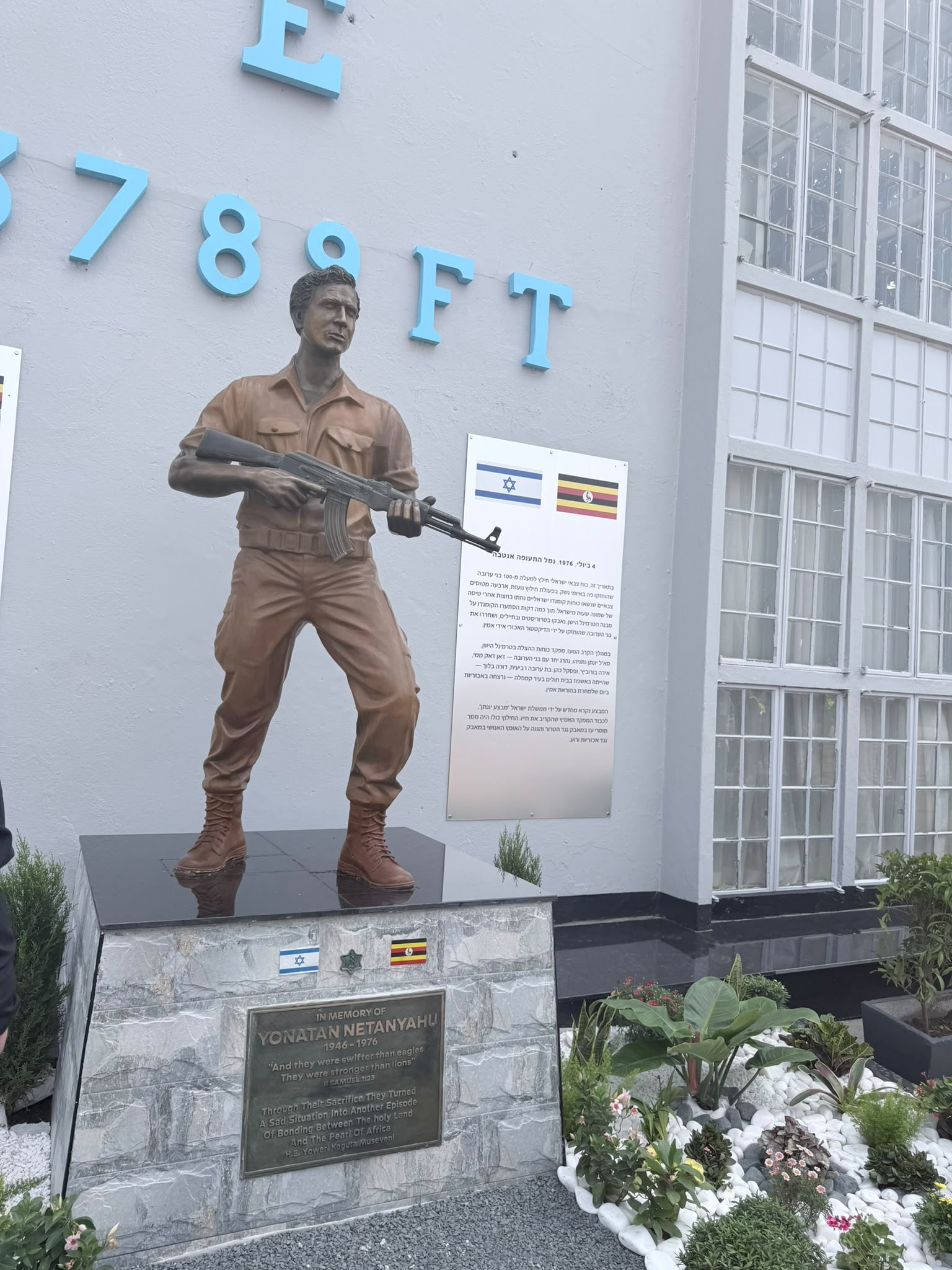
Statue of Commander Yonatan Netanyahu, killed during Operation Entebbe, at Entebbe International Airport in Uganda.

Some local tribes in Uganda have converted to Judaism, such as the Abayudaya. During the early twentieth century, Uganda, which was under British control, was offered to the Jews of the world as a homeland under the British Uganda Programme. Thiswas a cause of the troubled relationship between Ugandan leader Idi Amin and Israel and ended with Operation Entebbe in 1976.

== See also ==
- History of the Jews in Africa

=== Regions: ===
- History of the Jews in Central Africa
- History of the Jews in North Africa
- History of the Jews in Southern Africa
- History of the Jews in West Africa

=== Countries: ===
- History of the Jews in Madagascar
- History of the Jews in Malawi
- History of the Jews in Sudan
- History of the Jews in Zambia
- History of the Jews in Zimbabwe
