= History of the Jews in North Africa =

History of the Jews in North Africa: The article is ordered alphabetically and divided by country. There is no single agreed definition of North Africa; various definitions include:

- A region stretching from Western Sahara to the Red Sea in the east. The most common definition for the region's boundaries includes Algeria, Egypt, Libya, Morocco, Tunisia, and Western Sahara (the disputed territory between Morocco and the Sahrawi Arab Democratic Republic).
- The UN definition includes all of the above region, as well as Sudan.
- The African Union defines the region similarly, only differing from the UN in excluding the Sudan and including Mauritania.
- The Sahel, south of the Sahara desert, can be considered as the southern boundary of North Africa.
- North Africa includes the Spanish cities of Ceuta and Melilla, and the plazas de soberanía. It can also be considered to include Malta, as well as other Italian, Portuguese, and Spanish regions such as Lampedusa and Lampione, Madeira, and the Canary Islands.

== Algeria ==
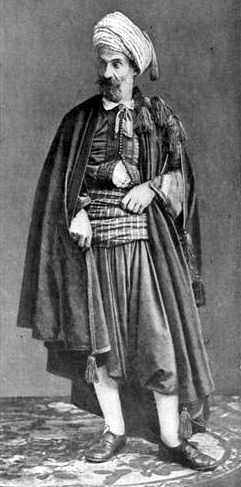
Algerian Jew, early 1900s.

The history of Jews in Algeria goes back to antiquity. Several waves of immigration helped to increase the population. There may have been Jews in Carthage and present-day Algeria before the Roman conquest, but the development of Jewish communities is linked to the Roman Empire. Jewish revolts in Judea and Cyrenaica in the 1st and 2nd centuries led to the arrival of Jewish immigrants from these regions. The Muslim conquest of North Africa, which was completed in Algeria in the 8th century, brought North Africa into the realm of Islamic civilization and had a lasting impact on the identity of local Jewish communities, whose status was henceforth governed by the dhimma. New immigrants later strengthened the Algerian Jewish community: Jews fled Spain during the 5th and 6th centuries, and again during the persecutions linked to the Spanish Reconquista of the 14th and 16th centuries. Many Sephardic Jews settled in Algeria, mixing with the local Jewish population and influencing its traditions. Later in the 19th century, many Jews from Tetouan arrived in Algeria, strengthening the ranks of the community.

After the French colonization of Algeria in 1830, Algerian Jews, like other Algerians, faced discrimination by the colonial state. Like Muslims, they were given the status of "indigène" (indigenous peoples) and were barred from gaining French citizenship unless particular conditions were met. However, the dhimma was abolished, and Jews became equal to Muslims under French law. This changed in 1870, with the Crémieux Decree granting Algerian Jews French citizenship, while Muslims remained under the second-class indigenous status. Algerian Jews increasingly identified with metropolitan France, and despite a period of forced return to second-class indigenous status during World War II, they opted en masse to be repatriated to France on the eve of the Algerian War of independence with a minority choosing Israel. This virtually put an end to more than 2,000 years of presence on Algerian soil. A few dozen very discreet Jews still live in Algeria. Their "repatriation" represents a unique case in the history of Jewish migration given that even though they were psychologically uprooted, they "returned" to France as citizens and not as refugees.

== Egypt ==
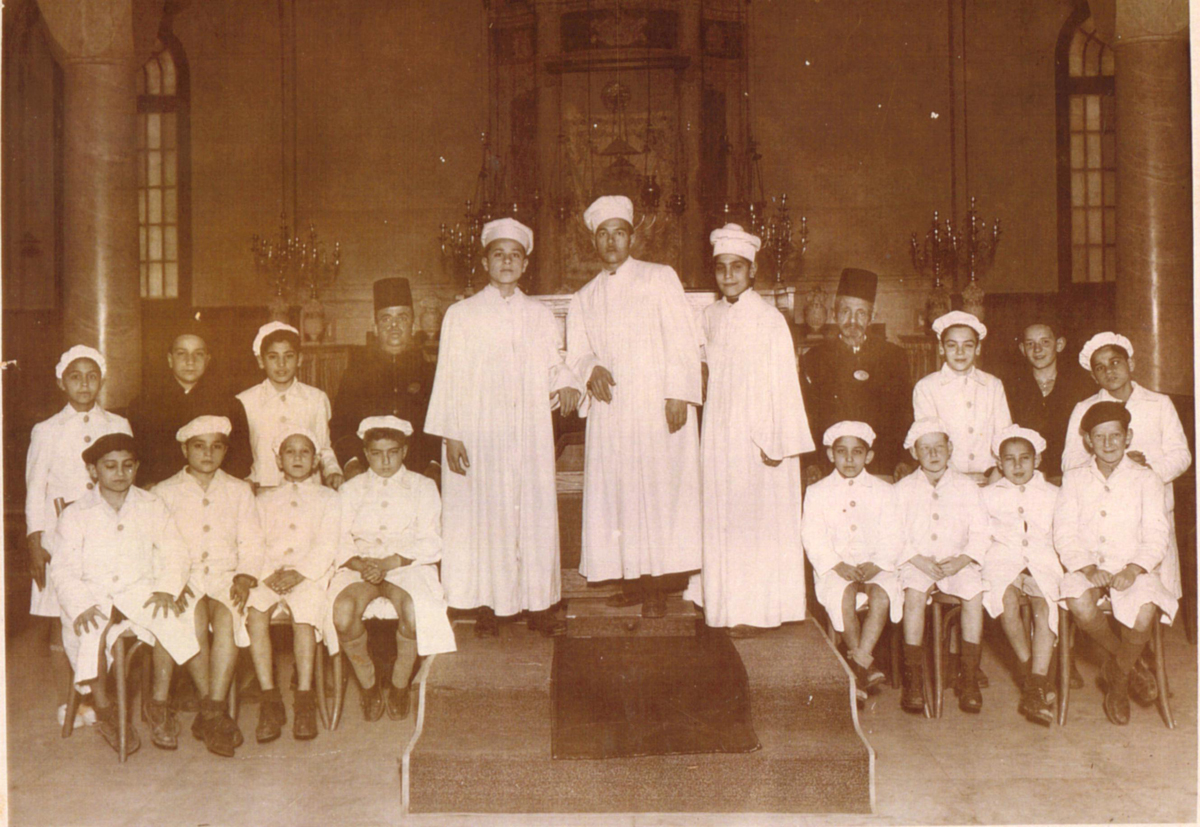
Egyptian Alexandria Jews. Choir of Rabbi Moshe Cohen in Samuel Menashe synagogue. Alexandria, 1900s.

The history of the Jews in Egypt goes back to ancient times. Egyptian Jews consisted of Arabic-speaking Rabbanites and Karaites. Though Egypt had its own community of Egyptian Jews, after the Expulsion of Jews from Spain more Sephardi and Karaite Jews began to migrate to Egypt, and their numbers increased significantly with the growth of trading prospects after the opening of the Suez Canal in 1869. As a result, Jews from many territories of the Ottoman Empire as well as Italy and Greece started to settle in the main cities of Egypt, where they thrived. The Ashkenazi Jews community, mainly confined to Cairo, began to arrive in the aftermath of the waves of pogroms that hit Europe in the 19th century. The modern Jewish population peaked in Egypt at somewhere between 75,000 and 80,000 in 1948. In the aftermath of the 1948 war between Israel and the Arab states, the 1954 Lavon Affair, and the 1956 Suez War, Jews and European groups like the French and British emigrated; much of their property was also confiscated.

== Libya ==
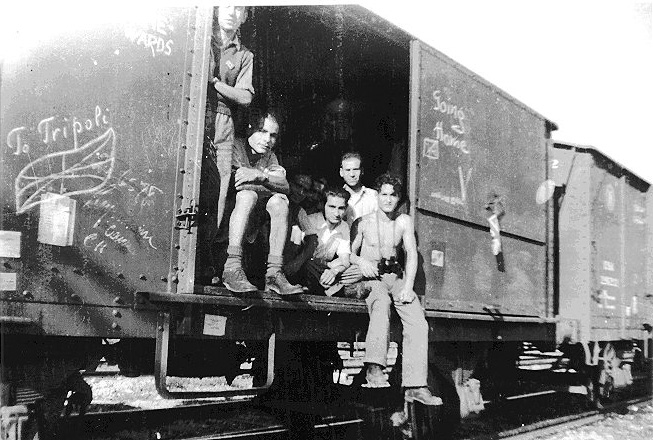
Holocaust survivors returning to Libya from concentration camp Bergen-Belsen after the "Libyan Jews holocaust"

The history of the Jews in Libya stretches back to the 3rd century BCE, when Cyrenaica was under Greek rule. The Jewish population of Libya, a part of the Sephardic Jews-Maghrebi Jews community, continued to populate the area continuously until modern times. During World War II, Libya's Jewish population was subjected to antisemitic Italian racial laws by the Fascist Italian regime and deportations by both the Italian and Nazi German armies.

Some of the worst anti-Jewish violence occurred in the years following the liberation of North Africa by Allied troops. From 5 to 7 November 1945, more than 140 Jews were killed and many more injured in a pogrom in Tripolitania. The rioters looted nearly all of the city's synagogues and destroyed five of them, along with hundreds of homes and businesses. In June 1948, anti-Jewish rioters killed another 12 Jews and destroyed 280 Jewish homes. This time, however, the Libyan Jewish community had prepared to defend itself, preventing more deaths.

In the late 1940s, some 40,000 Jews lived in Libya. The Libyan Jewish community suffered great insecurity during this period. The founding of Israel in 1948, as well as Libya's independence from Britain in 1951 and subsequent admission into the Arab League, led many Jews to emigrate. From 1948 to 1951, and especially after emigration became legal in 1949, 30,972 Jews moved to Israel though significant numbers moved to Italy and North America. Under Colonel Muammar Gaddafi, who ruled the country from 1969 to 2011, the situation deteriorated further, eventually leading to the emigration of the remaining Jewish population.

== Morocco ==
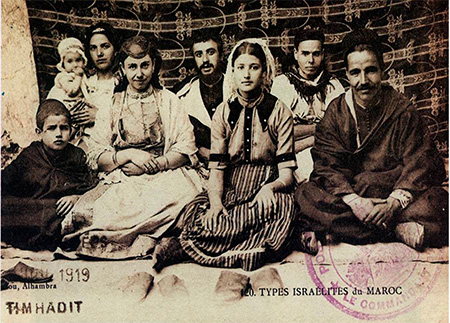
Moroccan Maghrebi Sephardi Jews, circa 1919

The history of the Jews in Morocco goes back to ancient times. Moroccan Jews constitute an ancient community, with the oldest irrefutable evidence of Judaism in Morocco dating to the Roman period. After the Muslim conquest of the Maghreb, Jews would become the primary religious minority group. The Jewish communities in Morocco have historically been diverse, with significant differences between urban and rural populations, It was not uncommon for different Jewish communities in Morocco to speak different languages.

Jews in Morocco traditionally lived together in communities, whether in Jewish villages in rural areas or, particularly after the 15th century (and especially from the 19th century), in an urban Mellah, or Jewish quarter. In the 19th century, due to economic transformations and the proliferation of European industrial imports competing with traditional Jewish crafts, there was a major migration of Jews from the rural hinterland to coastal cities.

The Alliance Israélite Universelle (AIU), a Paris-based organization that sought to improve the lives of Jews through a French education, opened its first school in Tétouan in 1862. The AIU helped create a class of Westernized Jews in Morocco's coastal cities accentuating differences between Morocco's urban and rural Jewish communities.

The Zionist movement in Morocco appeared in the early 20th century and spread slowly over the following decades through various forms of advocacy and substantial external backing. Only after the establishment of the State of Israel in 1948 was there any significant emigration of Moroccan Jews. Through Cadima and Operation Yachin, about 60,000 and 90,000 Moroccan Jews migrated to Israel, respectively.

In 1948, there were about 265,000 Jews in Morocco, with a maximum of between 250,000 and 350,000 at its peak in the 1950s. At that time, the Jewish community in Morocco was the largest in the Muslim world. By 2017, 2,000-3,000 remained. In 2025, the Jewish population in Morocco numbered 1,000.

== Sudan ==
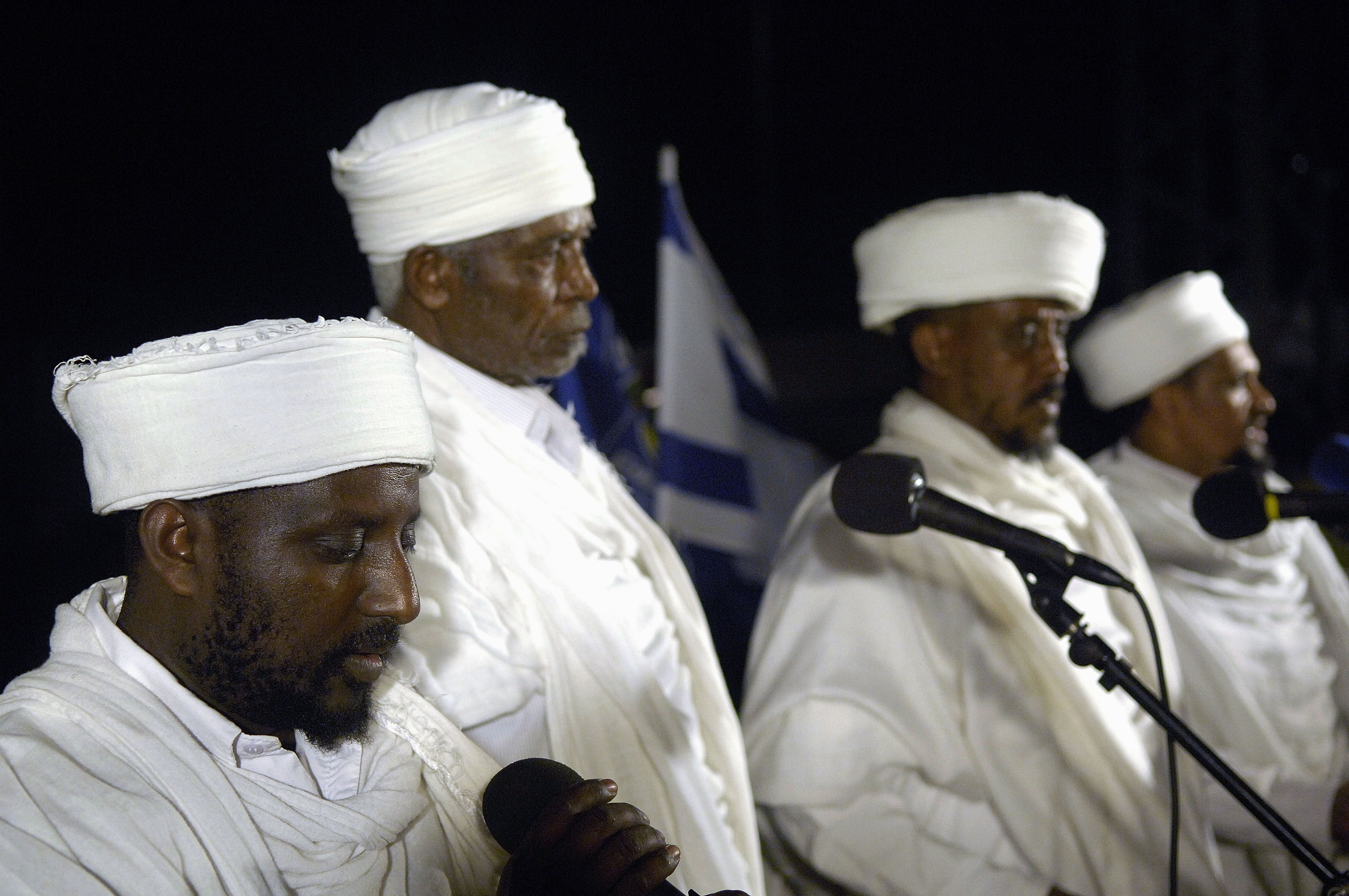
Kessim saying a prayer for Jews from Ethiopia who perished in Sudan on their way to Israel.

The history of the Jews in Sudan goes back to a small but vibrant community of Jews who lived there from about 1885 to around 1970. Most of the community left for Israel or Europe after antisemitic attacks began to spread in Sudan.

In 1898, General Kitchener and 20,000 Anglo-Egyptian troops entered Omdurman and regained control of the Sudan, with this new political status it began to economically flourish. The railway line built by the British from Cairo to Khartoum became particularly important for opening up a previously long and difficult route for traders, including many Jews. When the British arrived in 1898, there were 36 people who declared themselves to be Jewish in Sudan. They were quickly joined by many more Jewish families who saw the economic opportunities of the developing country. Beginning in approximately 1900, Jews from all over the Middle East and North Africa, in particular from Egypt, Iraq, and Syria, began to arrive in Sudan and settle along the Nile. Predominantly small-time merchants their businesses soon began to flourish. In 1905, Farag Shua, an Egyptian-Jewish merchant who had migrated to Sudan in 1900, established a makeshift synagogue in a small rented room and began teaching Jewish children Torah, Hebrew, and Jewish prayers. In 1908 the community established an organization called the Sudan Jewish Community, with Ben-Zion Coshi being elected as its president for life, serving until his death in 1917. Sudan did not have a rabbi until 1908, when Moroccan rabbi Suleiman Malka moved to Sudan with his family at the request of the Egyptian-Jewish religious authorities, who oversaw the affairs of the Sudanese Jews. The Jewish community of Khartoum was first officially organized in 1918. By 1926 the small synagogue they had quickly erected had been replaced by a brand new, self-funded building and several of its members owned large, successful businesses. In the 1930s, a few Jews escaping persecution in Europe settled in Sudan.

Despite the fact that the Jewish community as a whole was split between Khartoum, Khartoum North and Omdurman, it was incredibly tight-knit. There was only one synagogue in Sudan and two mikvehs, one in the synagogue and the other in the rabbi's house. A single mohel and shochet served the entire community and at the centre of the social scene was the bustling Jewish Social Club. There were no Jewish schools; Jewish children primarily went to English or Catholic schools with some going to a local Sudanese school. Most Jewish boys went to the Comboni College, a private Catholic school run by Italian priests.

At its peak, between 1930 and 1950 the Jewish community in Sudan numbered between 800 and 1,000 people, with about 250 Jewish families. During the World War II, anxiety and uncertainty began to rise in the Jewish community.ref name=":03" /> In 1956, Sudan gained independence and hostility towards the Jewish community began to grow as the Pan-Arabism of Egyptian President Nasser, with the anti-Israel rhetoric it entailed, gained popularity. Antisemitic attacks appeared in the press and Jews were accused of being fifth columnists.

However, as antisemitism intensified, many members of the community began to leave Sudan for Israel (via Greece), the United States, and European countries - mostly to the United Kingdom and Switzerland. Israel and Switzerland were the primary destinations of emigrating Sudanese Jews. Much of the community had left by 1960. In 1967, following the Six-Day War, there was a mass arrest of Jewish men and antisemitic attacks appeared in Sudanese newspapers advocating the torture and murder of prominent Jewish community leaders. Jewish emigration subsequently intensified, with the vast majority of Jews still in the country soon leaving. The last remaining Jews in Sudan left the country in the early 1970s. Overall, about 500 Sudanese Jews immigrated to Israel while the rest went to other countries. In response to a ruling from the Sahedrin calling on all Jews in exile to go up to Israel, a letter of 30 December 2024 from remnant of Jews in Sudan and Ethiopia who have declared their willingness to go up to Israel.

== Tunisia ==
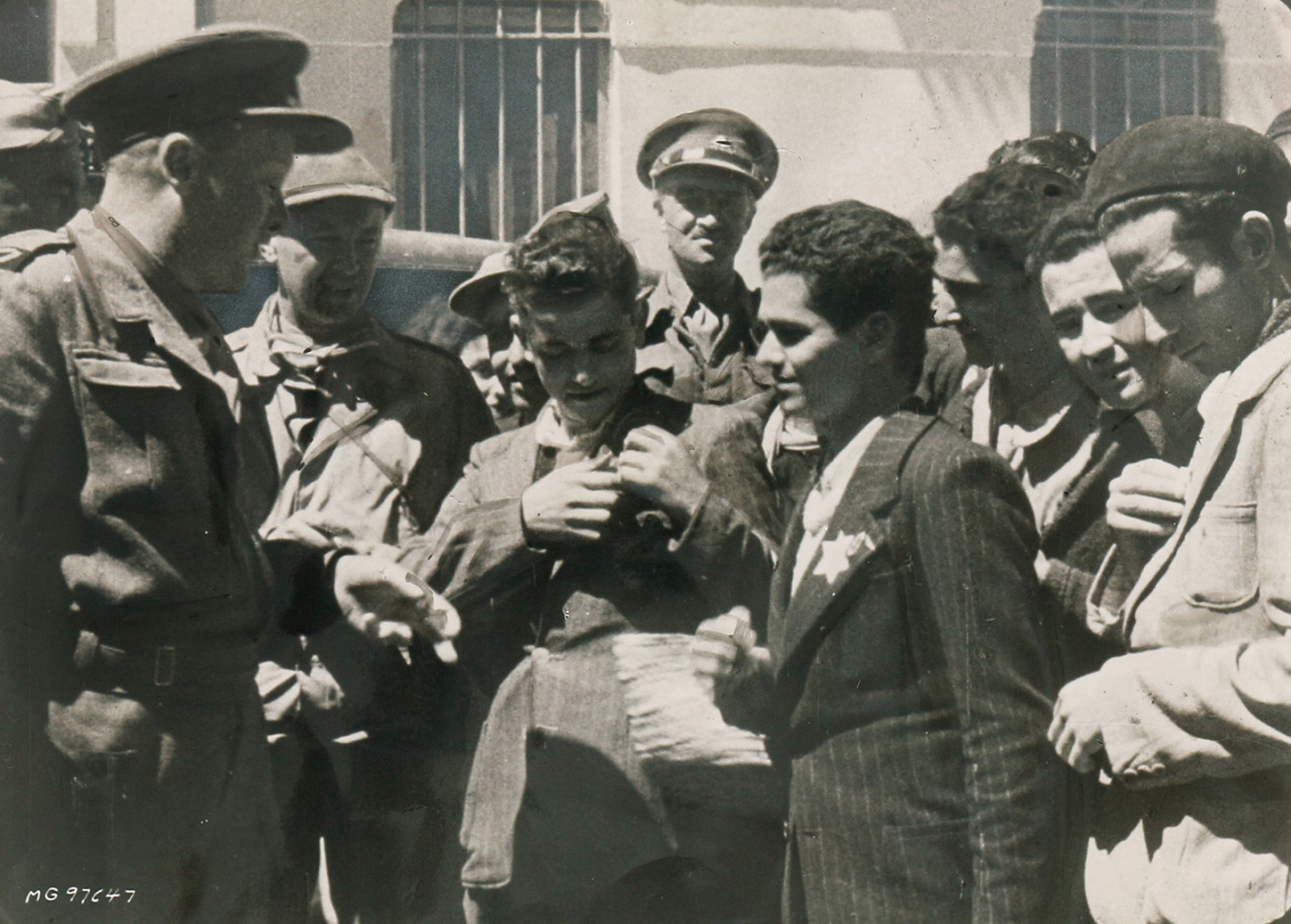
Press photograph of Jews removing the yellow badge from their lapels, observed by Allied soldiers. Tunisia, [ca. 1943]. Pasted on the verso of the photo is a newspaper clipping, describing the photo (English): "In a Tunisian village, Allied soldiers watch "little Jewish boys taking off the yellow stars they'd been made to wear as if they were lepers".

The history of the Jews in Tunisia dates back nearly two thousand years to the ancient Carthage. The Jewish community of Tunisia grew following successive waves of immigration and proselytism before its development was hampered by the imposition of anti-Jewish measures by the Byzantine Empire in late antiquity. After the Muslim conquest of the Maghreb, Tunisian Jews experienced periods of relative freedom which were followed by periods of discrimination and persecution. Under Muslim rule, Jews were granted legal status as dhimmi, which legally assured protections of life, property, and freedom of religion, but imposed an increased Jizya tax burden on them. The community developed Judeo-Tunisian Arabic. The arrival of Jews expelled from the Iberian Peninsula, often through Livorno, greatly influenced the community's composition, inter-group relations, and customs.

The economic, social and cultural position of the community was significantly compromised during the World War II due to the occupation of the French protectorate of Tunisia by the Axis powers.

The Israeli Declaration of Independence in 1948 and the ensuing 1948 Arab–Israeli War provoked a widespread antisemitic backlash in the Arab world, Prior to Tunisian independence in 1956, the Jewish population was estimated at 105,000 individuals. These Jews lived mainly in Tunis, with communities also present on the island of Djerba. Jews left Tunisia en masse in subsequent years due notably to the Bizerte crisis in 1961 and the Six-Day War in 1967. The population had declined to 1500 by 2017.

== See also ==
- History of the Jews in Africa

=== Regions: ===
- History of the Jews in Central Africa
- History of the Jews in East Africa
- History of the Jews in Southern Africa
- History of the Jews in West Africa

=== Topics: ===
- History of the Jews in the Byzantine Empire
- History of the Jews under Muslim rule
  - History of the Jews in the Ottoman Empire
  - Jewish exodus from Arab and Muslim countries
- List of Jews from the Arab world
- Al-Andalus (Islamic Spain) and Reconquista
  - Sephardi Jews
  - Berber Jews
  - Maghrebi Jews
