= Ngoma Lungundu =

Religious artifact

- Type: Drum
- Material: Wood
- Created: circa 14th century
- Discovered: 1950s
- Present location: Zimbabwe
- Culture: Lemba

The Ngoma Lungundu (meaning "the drum that thunders") is a sacred religious artifact that is held in high esteem by the Lemba people of Zimbabwe. The artifact is housed in the Zimbabwe Museum of Human Sciences and is regarded as the oldest wooden object ever discovered in sub-Saharan Africa.

Lemba oral tradition speaks of Ngoma Lungundu as a replica of the Biblical Ark of the Covenant, believed to be constructed almost 700 years ago from the remains of the original Ark, which was said to contain the Ten Commandments as described in the Bible.

The history of the Ngoma Lungundu has been documented by two researchers. In 1952, Harald von Sicard recounted discovering the Ngoma in a Zimbabwean cave, later relocating it to a Buluwayo museum. Seven years later, Pieter W. Van Heerden detailed the Ngoma Lungundu's existence in a Soutpansberg cave, specifically in the Tshiendeulu area near Dzata I, within the former Venda region.

In oral history, the Lemba people trace their origins to the Jewish region and they said they left Israel approximately 2,500 years ago. Their parents were born there and gradually migrated from Israel to Africa where they established the Lemba community. Over time, the Lemba have maintained certain Jewish-like customs, including the prohibition of pork, ritual animal slaughter, and the observance of a weekly holy day. They also often wear yarmulke-like skullcaps and display the Star of David on their gravestones.

Despite these practices, the Lemba people are not strictly Jewish in the religious sense, as many have converted to Christianity or Islam over the centuries. Nonetheless, their adherence to customs such as the observance of dietary laws, prayer rituals and reverence for sacred objects like the Ngoma Lungundu has led to comparisons between their culture and Jewish practices.

== Ngoma Lungundu: Signs of Jewish relations ==
The Ark of the Covenant and the Ngoma Lungundu share striking similarities. Both were believed to possess supernatural powers, symbolizing divine presence. The Ark, containing the Ten Commandments and Aaron's staff, was housed in the Tabernacle's Holy of Holies, while the Ngoma Lungundu was carried by the Lemba people.

Similarities between the two include:

- Divine significance: Both were considered divine, with the Ark containing sacred tablets and the Ngoma Lungundu believed to hold supernatural powers.
- Carried into battle: Both were used as symbols of victory and carried into battles.
- Guardianship: The Ark was guarded by a priestly caste founded by Aaron, while the Ngoma Lungundu was guarded by the Buba clan.
- Guidance: Both were believed to provide guidance, with the Ark guided by a pillar of cloud and fire, while the Ngoma Lungundu guided by a star and a mythical pillar of flame.

According to Lemba tradition, Ngoma Lungundu was created using remnants of the original Ark of the Covenant. It was believed to have been lost for many years but was rediscovered in a storeroom in Harare, Zimbabwe. The rediscovery of the Ngoma Lungundu has sparked renewed pride within the Lemba community, with many regarding it as a crucial link to their Jewish heritage.

Genetic research has further supported the Lemba's claims of Jewish ancestry. In 2000, genetic tests conducted by British scientists revealed that the Lemba, particularly members of the Buba clan, carry the Cohen Modal Haplotype, a genetic marker associated with the Jewish priestly lineage, the Kohanim. This finding has been cited as evidence that the Lemba's claims of descent from Jewish ancestors, including the priestly class, have a basis in genetic reality.

Professor Tudor Parfitt, who led research on the Lemba, commented on the findings, stating that it appeared that the Jewish priesthood continued not only in the West but also among the Lemba's priestly clan. This genetic link further solidifies the Lemba's connection to the Jewish people, even though their practices have evolved over time and they are now predominantly Christian or Muslim.

With Ngoma Longundu, the Lemba have maintained several distinct cultural practices that reflect their Jewish heritage. They refrain from eating pork, adhere to certain dietary restrictions, and observe weekly holy days. They also engage in ritual slaughter of animals, a practice common among Jewish communities. Additionally, the Lemba have preserved the sacred prayer language, a mix of Hebrew and Arabic, which they believe connects them to their ancient ancestors.

=== Ngoma Lungundu in Lemba identity ===
For the Lemba people, the Ngoma Lungundu represents not only their Jewish roots but also their identity and pride as a distinct community in Zimbabwe. The artifact is venerated as a symbol of their spiritual connection to their forebears and to the ancient Jewish traditions they believe they share. The presence of the Ngoma Lungundu in Lemba ceremonies and rituals reinforces the community's strong ties to its Jewish history and culture.
