= Tudor Parfitt =

Welsh-born academic

- Born: 10 October 1944 (age 82); Porth, Wales
- Occupations: Historian; writer; broadcaster; traveller; adventurer

Academic background
- Education: Loughborough Grammar School
- Alma mater: University of Oxford (D.Phil.)

Academic work
- Discipline: Jewish Studies
- Institutions: University of Toronto: University of Southampton; School of Oriental and African Studies

Tudor Parfitt (born 10 October 1944) is a British historian, writer, broadcaster, traveller and adventurer. He specialises in the study of Jewish communities and Judaising communities around the world, particularly in Africa, Asia and the Americas and the development of issues about the construction of race.

Parfitt is emeritus professor of modern Jewish studies in the University of London at the School of Oriental and African Studies (SOAS), where he was the founding director of the Centre for Jewish Studies. He is now senior associate fellow at the Oxford Centre for Hebrew and Jewish Studies. He is corresponding senior fellow of the Académie Royale des Sciences d’Outre-Mer, Koninklijke Academie voor Overzeese Wetenschappen, Belgium and is on the board as chair of the academic advisory committee of the Paris-based Projet Aladin and is on the Committee of Experts of the New York-based Global Hope Coalition. He is a Fellow of the Royal Historical Society in the United Kingdom. He was appointed distinguished professor at Florida International University in 2012 and distinguished university professor in 2018. He is alumni fellow at the Hutchins Center for African and African American Research at Harvard College. In 2011 he gave the Nathan Huggins Lectures at Harvard College, which were published by Harvard University Press.

== Early life and education ==
Parfitt was born in Porth, Wales in 1944, the son of Vernon (a headmaster) and Margaret (née Sears) Parfitt. He was educated at Loughborough Grammar School in Leicestershire, England. In 1963-4 he spent a gap year with Voluntary Service Overseas (VSO) in Jerusalem, where he worked with handicapped people, some of whom were Holocaust survivors. Upon his return to Britain, he studied Hebrew and Arabic at the University of Oxford and at the Hebrew University of Jerusalem. In 1968 he was awarded the Goodenday Fellowship at the Hebrew University of Jerusalem. He completed a D.Phil. at Oxford with David Patterson and Albert Hourani, on the history of the Jews in Palestine and their relations with their Muslim neighbours. He expanded it for publication by the Royal Historical Society.

== Academic career ==
In 1972 Parfitt was appointed lecturer in Hebrew language, literature and history at the University of Toronto, Canada. In 1974 he was appointed Parkes Fellow at the Parkes Institute for the Study of Jewish/non-Jewish Relations at the University of Southampton in England. Shortly afterward, he took up a lectureship in Modern Hebrew at SOAS. His first body of work interrogated the nature of the revival of the Hebrew language.

Throughout the 1980s, Parfitt undertook covert lecture tours to Jewish Refusenik groups in the Soviet Union and Czechoslovakia. In 1985 he spent several months visiting the various Jewish communities of Asia - including Thailand, Hong Kong, Singapore and Japan. In Japan he interested the Emperor's brother, Prince Mikasa, in the Jewish communities of the East. In 1987 he was asked by the Jewish community of Singapore to write an official history of the island's Jews. That same year he visited Syria to write about the situation of its Jewish community for the Minority Rights Group. He was arrested by the Syrian secret police, the Mukhabarat, during his trip. He describes these events in his first travel book, The Thirteenth Gate. His second travel book, Journey to the Vanished City (1992) describes his six-month journey across Africa. In the early 1990s, Parfitt conducted fieldwork in Yemen, researching its ancient Jewish community, and wrote a book on the subject. In The Road to Redemption, he said that the Yemenite Jews had emigrated to Israel as a result of extreme prejudice, persecution, legal disabilities and because of the rapidly changing economy of the Indian Ocean region. He also researched and presented a BBC documentary called The Last Exile on this subject. In 2002 he published his Lost Tribes of Israel: the History of a Myth. One of his themes is that the creation of Israelite and Judaic identities throughout the world, from the Americas to Papua New Guinea, was an innate feature of Western colonialism. Constructing unknown peoples as Jews was an insidious means of controlling them. In addition such constructed identities served as a means of explaining a wide range of religious and cultural manifestations. In some cases the colonial effort was supported by the idea that indigenous cultures were descended from the Lost Tribes of Israel. His interest in far-flung Jewish Judaising communities has led him to travel to Papua New Guinea, Madagascar and Central and South America. His work on marginal Jewish communities and aspiring Jewish communities throughout the world led to his being consulted by a Knesset select committee which eventually argued that the State of Israel should formulate new policies to address the aspirations of these 'lost tribes'.

== African Judaism ==
Parfitt has been the pioneer of the study of Judaism and Judaising movements in Africa. In 1984 Parfitt was commissioned by the London-based Minority Rights Group to write a report on the Ethiopian Jews who had fled Ethiopia. They had migrated to escape persecution and famine, but were dying in large numbers in the refugee camps along the border between the Sudan and Ethiopia. His visits to the camps coincided with Israel's Operation Moses, which rescued thousands of Ethiopian Jews and took them to Israel. Parfitt's book on the operation Operation Moses was translated into many languages. He later was selected as the vice-president of the Society for the Study of Ethiopian Jewry (SOSTEJE).

Subsequently, he turned his attention to another African and proposed Jewish group: the Lemba tribe of southern Africa. They claimed descent from some ancient Jewish population. He published Journey to the Vanished City (1992) about his six-month journey throughout Africa. In a subsequent edition he traced the origins of the tribe to the eastern end of the Hadhramaut in Yemen. There he discovered the ancient city of Sena and the possible origins of the tribe in some migrating Jewish traders. Seeking more data, in 1996 and later years Parfitt organised Y-DNA studies of Lemba males. These found a high proportion of paternal Semitic ancestry, DNA that is common to both Arabs and Jews from the Middle East. The work confirmed that the male line had descended from a few ancestors from southern Arabia. In recognition of this work, he was made corresponding fellow of the Académie Royale des Sciences d'Outre-Mer.TV programs about the discoveries, and major newspaper coverage, brought Parfitt international attention.In 2000 e appeared on '60 Minutes' produced by CBS. He was nicknamed the British 'Indiana Jones,' after the film character.

The Lemba have a tradition of having brought a drum, or ngoma, from the Middle East centuries ago. Parfitt noted that their description of the ngoma was similar to that of the Biblical Ark of the Covenant. He observed that rabbinic sources maintain that there were two Arks of the Covenant: one the ceremonial Ark, covered with gold, which was eventually placed in the Holy of Holies in the Temple; the other the Ark of War, which had been carved from wood by Moses and was a relatively simple object. Parfitt proposed that the Ark of War may have been taken by Jews across the Jordan River and, citing Islamic sources, suggests that they perhaps carried it as they migrated south, while under rule by Arab tribes. The Lemba claim to have brought their ark/ngoma from Arabia at some point in the past. In 2007, Parfitt discovered an object he claimed was an ancient copy of the original ngoma. Parfitt wrote The Lost Ark of the Covenant: Solving the 2,500 Year Old Mystery of the Fabled Biblical Ark (2008), documenting his findings. Associated documentaries were aired on Channel Four and the History Channel. The BBC reported that the discovery of the ngoma "instilled pride among many of the Lemba". In 2010 Parfitt was invited to address a symposium in Harare on the subject; attendees included the cabinet and vice-president John Nkomo. The ngoma has been exhibited at the Zimbabwe Museum of Human Sciences. Parfitt subsequently wrote about Judaising movements elsewhere in Africa and in 2020 described how knowledge of Black Jewish communities in Africa and particularly the community in Loango had a decisive impact on the development of race theory during the Enlightenment and later. Parfitt's pioneering work has contributed to the expanding study of the spread of Judaism and Judaising movements throughout the African continent.

== Other work ==
Parfitt has a particular interest in eastern Jewish communities. He collected DNA which helped unravel the complex history of the Bene Israel community of western India. He did archival work on the Jews of Singapore and has recently worked with communities in Indonesia and Papua New Guinea. Parfitt's other academic interests have been: the Sephardi/Mizrahi communities of the Muslim world, Jewish-Muslim relations, Hebrew and Hebrew Literature, Judaising movements, Jewish genetic identity and the discourses surrounding it, and Jews in Asia and Africa. He has published widely on the margins of the Jewish world. More recently he has written on general issues concerning the history of racial constructs. His widely reviewed book on the history of race as it affects Jews and Blacks — Hybrid Hate: Conflations of Antisemitism & Anti-Black Racism from the Renaissance to the Third Reich — was published by Oxford University Press in 2021.

Parfitt has published over 100 articles and written, edited or translated 32 books which have been translated into fifteen languages.

== Publications ==
=== Books ===
- Parfitt, T. (2021) Hybrid Hate: Conflations of Antisemitism & Anti-Black Racism from the Renaissance to the Third Reich, Oxford University Press
- Parfitt, T., Miles W. and Lis D. eds. (2016) "The Shadow Of Moses: New Jewish Movements In Africa And The Diaspora", Africa World Press.
- Parfitt, T. and Fisher N. (editor). (2016). "Joining the Jewish People: New Jews and Emerging Jewish Communities in a Globalised World", Cambridge Scholars’ Press.
- Parfitt, T. (2014) and Fromm Annette B., "Gogodala: Transition and Revival" Patricia and Philip Frost Art Museum, Florida International University.
- Parfitt, T. (2013) Miccolli D. and Trevisan-Semi, E., eds. Memory and Ethnicity: Ethnic Museums in Israel and the Diaspora, Cambridge Scholars’ Press
- Parfitt, T. (2013) Black Jews in Africa and the Americas, New York: Harvard University Press
- Parfitt, T. and E. Bruder. (2012) African Zion: Studies in Black Judaism, Cambridge Scholars' Press.
- Parfitt, T. (2008) The Lost Ark of the Covenant, London/New York: HarperCollins.
- Parfitt, T. and Egorova, Y. (2005) Genetics, Mass Media, and Identity: A Case Study of the Genetic Research on the Lemba and Bene Israel, London: Routledge.
- Parfitt, T and Trevisan-Semi, E., (2005) The Jews of Ethiopia: the birth of an élite. London: Routledge.
- Parfitt T. (2004) The Lost Tribes of Israel: the History of a Myth, London: Weidenfeld and Nicolson.
- Parfitt, T. and Egorova, Y., (2003) Jews, Muslims and Mass Media : Mediating the Other, London: Routledge Curzon.
- Parfitt, T. and Trevisan Semi, E. (2002) Judaising Movements: Studies in the Margins of Judaism, London: Routledge Curzon.
- Parfitt, T. (2000) Israel and Ishmael: Studies in Muslim-Jewish Relations, London: Curzon.
- Parfitt, T. and Trevisan-Semi, E., (1999) The Beta Israel in Ethiopia and Israel: Studies on the Ethiopian Jews, London: Curzon.
- Parfitt, T. (1996) The Road to Redemption: The Jews of the Yemen 1900–1950. Brill's Series in Jewish Studies vol. XVII. Leiden: Brill.
- Parfitt, T. and Abramson G., (1995) Jewish education and learning: published in honour of Dr. David Patterson on the occasion of his seventieth birthday. Chur, Switzerland: Harwood Academic Publishers.
- Parfitt, T., Kaplan, S. and Trevisan-Semi, E., (1995) Between Africa and Zion : proceedings of the First International Congress of the Society for the Study of Ethiopian Jewry. Jerusalem: Ben-Zvi Institute.
- Parfitt, T. and Trevisan-Semi, E., eds. (1993) L'altro Visto Dall'altro. Letteratura Araba ed Ebraica a Confronto, Milan: Cortina Libreria.
- Parfitt, T. (1992) Journey to the Vanished City: the Search for a Lost Tribe of Israel, New York: Random House.
- Parfitt, T. (1988) The Jews of Arab Countries and Iran, Zionist Federation of Great Britain and Ireland.
- Parfitt, T. (1987) The Jews of Africa and Asia, London: Minority Rights Group
- Parfitt, T. (1987) The Thirteenth Gate : Travels among the Lost Tribes of Israel, London: Weidenfeld & Nicolson.
- Parfitt, T. (1987) The Jews in Palestine, 1800–1882, Royal Historical Society Studies in History (52). Woodbridge: Published for the Royal Historical Society by Boydell.
- Parfitt, T. (1985) Operation Moses: The Untold Story of the Secret Exodus of the Falasha Jews from Ethiopia, London : Weidenfeld and Nicolson.
- Parfitt, T. and Abramson, G., (1985) The Great transition : the recovery of the lost centres of modern Hebrew literature, Totowa, N.J.: Rowman & Allanheld.
- Parfitt, T. and Kessler D. (1985) The Falashas: the Jews of Ethiopia, London: Minority Rights Group.
- Parfitt, T. and Abramson G. (1983) Great tranquillity: questions and answers [Translation from the Hebrew of Yehuda Amichai's Shalvah gedolah]. New York: Harper & Row.

=== Documentaries ===
- Parfitt, T. (2015) Tudor Parfitt and the Lost Tribes of Israel: (Secrets of the Bible: Season 1, Episode 5) Director Tim Gaunt
- Parfitt, (2013) T. TED-X talk exploring Religion, Genetics and Identity
- Parfitt. T. (2013) The Lost Tribe PBS, WLRN channel 17 (about Parfitt's FIU Expedition to the Gogodala Tribe of Papua New Guinea): Director Tim Long
- Parfitt, T. (2012) "The Black Jews of South Africa and the Lost Ark of the Covenant". (Issues of Faith) Director Eugene Botha. SABC.
- Parfitt, T. (2008) Quest for the Lost Ark. Director Martin Kemp. Channel Four/ History Channel
- Parfitt, T. (1999) To the Ends of the Earth: Search for the Sons of Abraham. Director Chris Hale. Channel Four / NOVA
- Parfitt, T. (1993) The Longest Exile, BBC Producer Julian Hale
- Parfitt, T. (1992) King Solomon’s Tribe, BBC Producer Julian Hale
- Parfitt, T. (1988) The Twice Promised Land, Three-part documentary to mark the 40th anniversary of the State of Israel, BBC, Producer Steve Sackur
