= Kulanu (organization) =

Jewish non-profit organization

Kulanu is a Jewish non-profit organization dedicated to supporting Jewish communal life among lost and dispersed communities, primarily in Africa and Central America.

The organization was founded in 1994 and is associated with a dozens of communities around the world. The organization is noted for actively in supporting members of the Lemba people who wish to practice Judaism. Related efforts by Kulanu include the development of indigenous form of Jewish practice such as the production of Jewish liturgy with African melodies and rhythms.
