= Zimbabwe Museum of Human Sciences =

Anthropology and archaeology museum in Harare, Zimbabwe

Coordinates: 17°49′57″S 31°02′20″E

The Zimbabwe Museum of Human Sciences
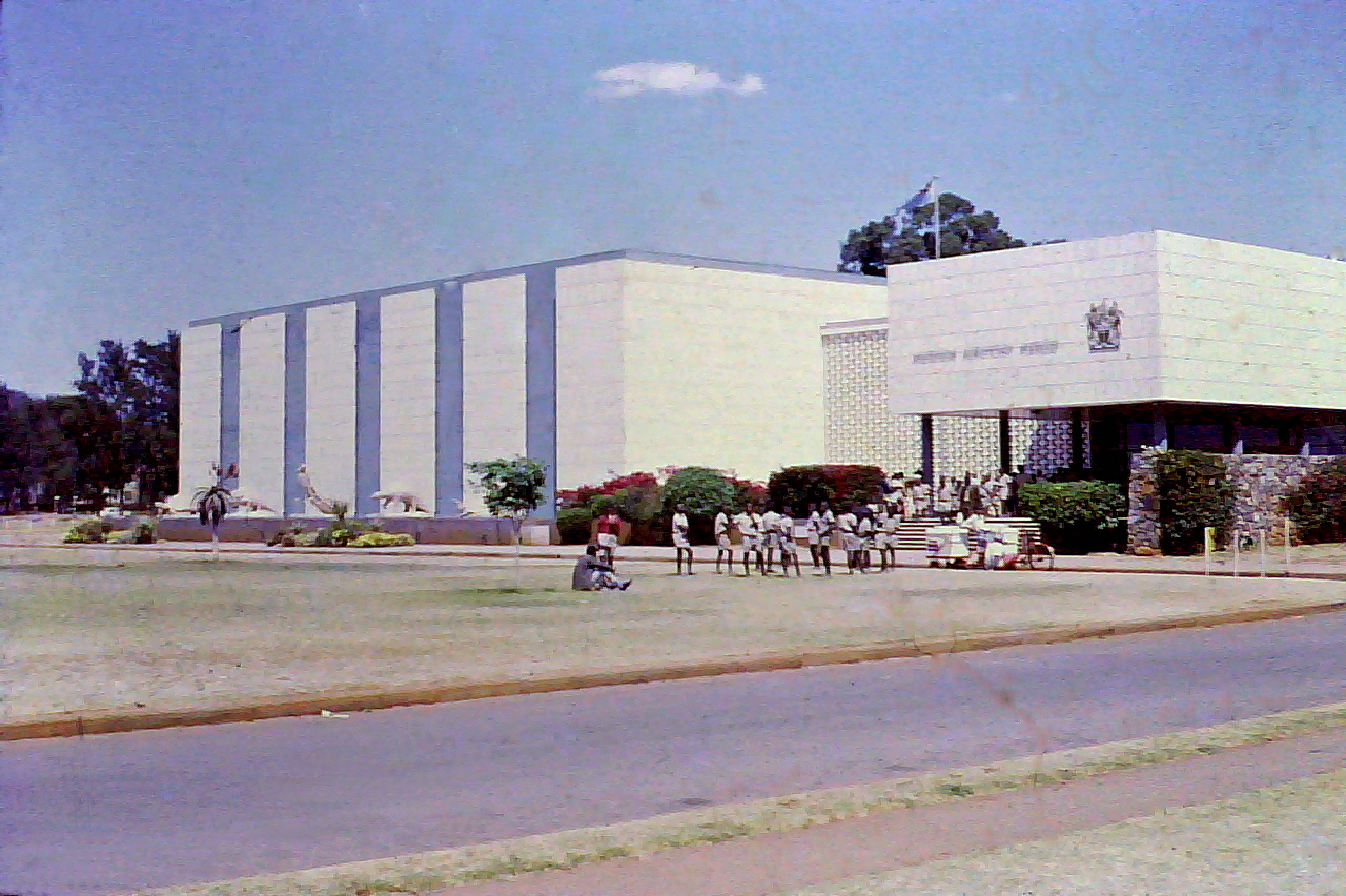
- Museum, c. 1970s
- Former name: Queen Victoria Museum
- Location: Harare, Zimbabwe
- Collections: ethnography, archaeology, human evolution, Shona culture, modern art
- Website: nmmz.co.zw

The Zimbabwe Museum of Human Sciences (formerly the Queen Victoria Museum) is a national museum in Harare, Zimbabwe. It was designed and built by James Cope Christie, opened in 1903 and was renamed after independence in 1980. Its focuses are archaeology and anthropology.

According to the Zimbabwe Embassy, the museum houses a library, exhibition galleries, and a model Shona village, in addition to its ethnographic and archaeological holdings. Wildlife exhibits are also on show in public galleries.

The museum contains the seven-hundred-year-old Lemba artifact Ngoma Lungundu, which is the oldest wooden object ever found in sub-Saharan Africa.

The museum is located in Harare’s Civic Centre, at the corner of Rotten Row and Samora Machel Avenue (P.O. Box CY 33, Causeway), Harare, Zimbabwe.
