= Lemba people =

Ethnic group in Southern Africa

Lemba
Sena
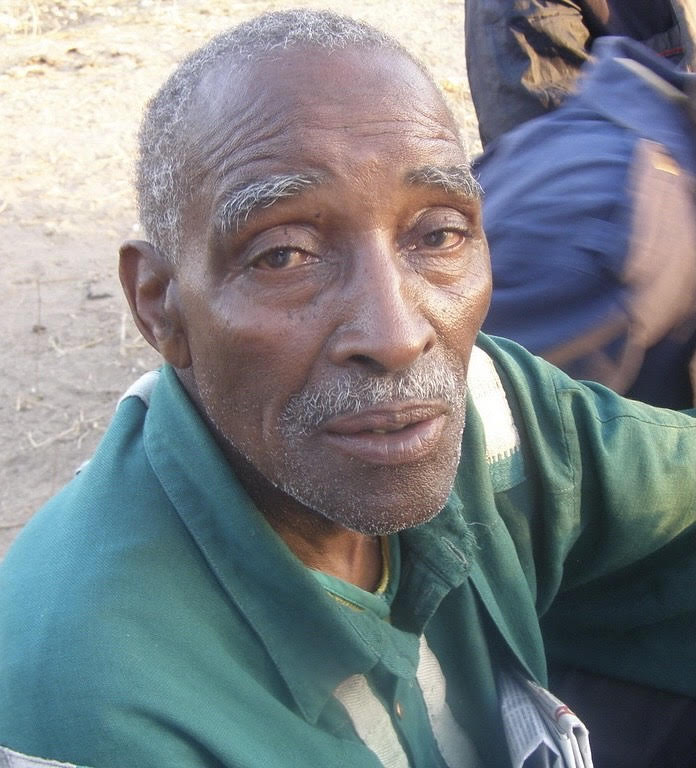
- A Lemba man from the Gutu District

Regions with significant populations
- South Africa (esp. Limpopo Province), Malawi, Mozambique

Languages
- Presently Venda, IsiNdebele, Karanga and Pedi (Previously Old South Arabian languages)

Religion
- Christianity, Islam, Judaism

Related ethnic groups
- Swahili, Shirazi, Hadhrami

The Lemba are an ethnic group currently residing in South Africa, Malawi, Mozambique and Zimbabwe, of mixed Bantu and Yemeni ancestry.

Since the late twentieth century, there has been increased media and scholarly attention about the Lemba's common partial descent from Semitic peoples of West Asia. Genetic Y-DNA analyses have established a paternal West Asian origin for the majority of the Lemba population, while the matrilineal origins are exclusively from Sub Saharan Africa.

== Etymology ==
It has been suggested that the exonym "Lemba" may originate in kilemba (most likely spread via the Mwera derivative chilemba), a Swahili word meaning turban. Thus, in context, the word "Lemba" as an ethnic identifier therefore translates to 'those who wear turbans'.

Another theory is that the word "Lemba" may originate from the word lembi, a term which occurs in several Northeastern Bantu languages meaning a "non-African" or a "respected foreigner".

The 'Lemba' themselves prefer the name Mwenye as an exonym but call themselves Sena (or Sana) as an endonym for their city of origin.

== History ==
According to modern-day historians, the Lemba were Muslim traders with possible Jewish ancestry who gradually Africanised and came to speak Shona. As they integrated more into Shona life they eventually lost their Muslim faith and culture, and were known as Mwenye. Their candidate lost the 1644 Butua civil war, and they later migrated south.

=== Oral traditions ===
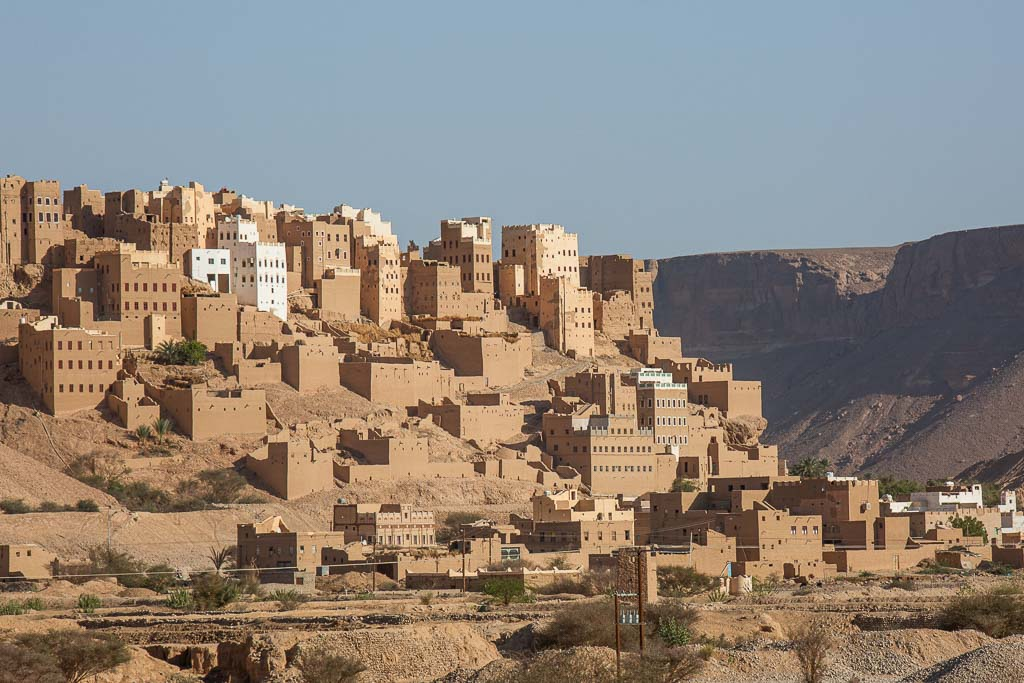
Yemen, Hadhramaut

What is possibly the oldest recorded origin story of the Lemba people was documented by Henri-Alexandre Junod (a Swiss-born South African missionary). In 1908, he wrote:

Some old Balemba of both the Spelonken and the Duiwelskloof country told my informant the following legend:

'[We] have come from a very remote place, on the other side of the sea. We were on a big boat. A terrible storm nearly destroyed us all. The boat was broken into two pieces. One half of us reached the shores of this country; the others were taken away with the second half of the boat, and we do not know where they are now. We climbed the mountains and arrived among the Banyai. There we settled, and after a time we moved southwards to the Transvaal; but we are not the Banyai.

Tudor Parfitt interprets that the legend about the destruction of the boat and the division of the tribe is perhaps a way of explaining the fact that Lemba clans are to be found in several separate locations. However, it could equally be taken as an expression of a fractured sense of identity.

The original Sena was most likely located in Yemen, specifically in the ancient town of Sanā (also known as Sanāw) which is located within the easternmost portion of the Hadhramaut.

==== Migration into Africa ====
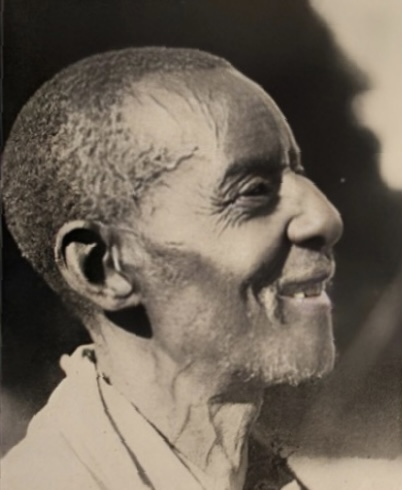
A Lemba man from the Transvaal, South Africa (1940)

The Lemba claim that they settled in Tanzania and Kenya, building what was referred to as another Sena, or "Sena II". Others supposedly settled in Malawi, where their descendants reside today. Some settled in Mozambique, eventually migrating to Zimbabwe and South Africa. They also claim that their ancestors constructed Great Zimbabwe, now preserved as a monument. While some scholars, including Zimbabwean archaeologist Ken Mufuka, as well as writer Tudor Parfitt believe that either the Lemba or the Venda may have participated in the construction of Great Zimbabwe, most academics who are experts in this field believe that the construction of the enclosure at Great Zimbabwe is largely attributable to the ancestors of other Shona peoples. Such works are noted as typical of their ancestral civilizations.

== Religion ==
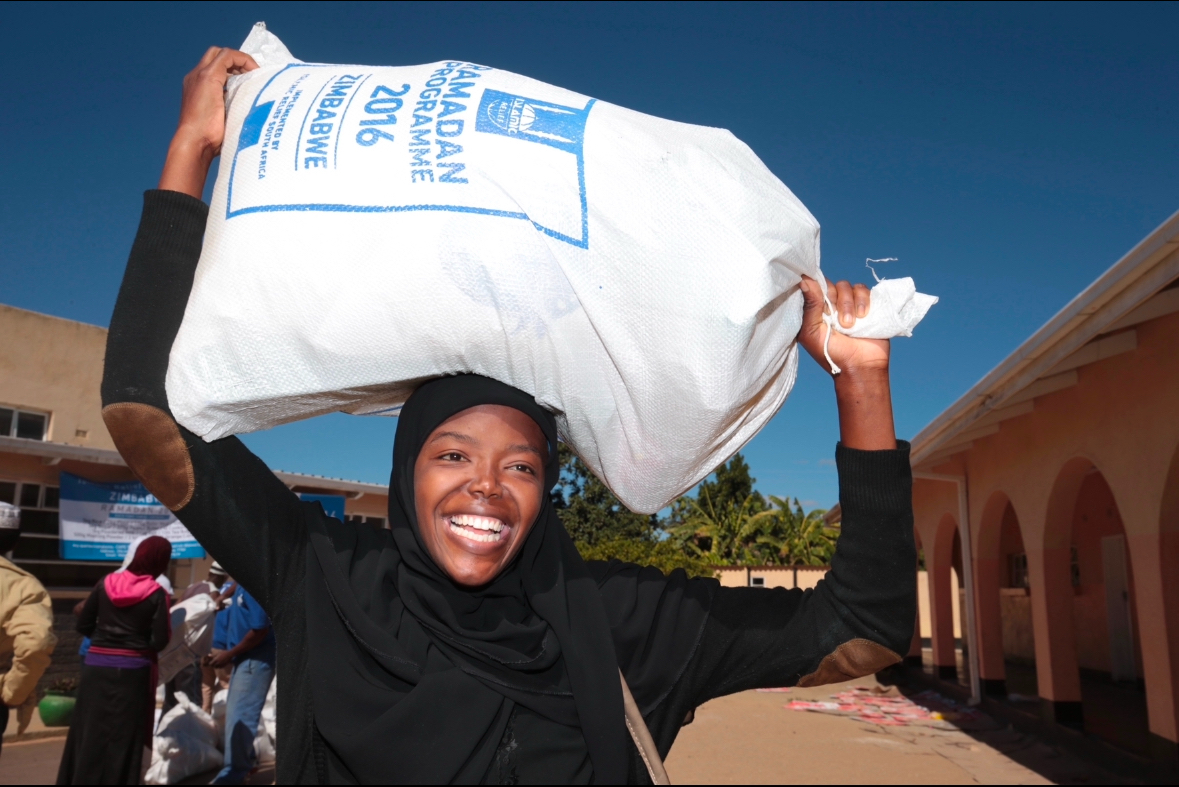
Lemba woman during Ramadan

Whilst most Lemba are Christians, there is also a sizeable minority of Lemba who are practicing Jews or Muslims. Edith Bruder wrote that "from a theological point of view, the Lemba's customs and rituals reveal religious pluralism and interdependence of these various practices" and see membership of these religions "in cultural rather than religious terms. These apparently religious identities do not prevent them from declaring themselves Jews through religious practice and ethnic identification." In 1992, Parfitt pointed to the strong cultural component in Lemba identification with Judaism. In 2002, Parfitt wrote that "Those Lemba, who perceive themselves as ethnically Jewish, find no contradiction in regularly attending a Christian church."

In recent years, there has been a Jewish "renaissance" amongst the Lemba, with many of them reverting to religious Judaism under halakhic laws. Some Lemba have even made aliyah. Many religious holidays which were rarely celebrated due to urban migration and Evangelicalism in Africa are being celebrated by greater numbers of Lemba, with many communities coming together for passover seders all over the region.

=== Dietary laws of Jewish-identifying Lemba ===
These Lemba practice dietary laws based on the books of Leviticus and Deuteronomy. Permitted and forbidden animals are seen in Leviticus 11:3–8 and Deuteronomy 14:4–8. Forbidden birds are listed in Leviticus 11:13–23 and Deuteronomy 14:12–20. The Lemba do not eat rodents, shellfish or any other "sea-scavengers" such as crustaceans, unlike in Islam, where consumption of prawns is permitted. Mixtures of milk and meat are not prepared or eaten, with traditional Lemba households having separate pots for each of them.

=== Halakhic status as Jews ===
In Orthodox Judaism Halakhic Jewish status is determined by documentation of an unbroken matrilineal line of descent and when no such line of descent exists, it is determined by conversion to Judaism. Jews who adhere to Orthodox or Conservative rabbinism believe that "Jewish status by birth" is only passed from a Jewish female to her children (if she herself is a Jew by birth or a Jew by conversion to Judaism) regardless of the Jewish status of the father. Because of the absence of matrilineal Jewish descent for the Lemba, Orthodox or Conservative Judaism would not recognise them as 'Halakhically Jewish.' The Lemba would need to complete a formal conversion process in order to be accepted as Jews.

The Reform and Reconstructionist denominations, the Karaites, and Haymanot Jews all recognize patrilineage. As more is learned about the widespread history of the Jewish people, the Reform branch of Judaism has acknowledged the existence of an unusual line of descent outside the European and indigenous Middle Eastern Jewish spheres. Especially since the publication of the genetic results of the Lemba, American Jewish communities have reached out to the people, offering assistance, sending books on Judaism and related study materials, and initiating ties in order to teach the Lemba about Rabbinic Judaism. So far, few Lemba have converted to Rabbinic Judaism.

South African Jews of European descent have long been aware of the Lemba, but they have never accepted them as Jews or thought of them as more than an "intriguing curiosity." Generally, the Lemba have not been accepted as Jews because of their lack of matrilineal descent. Several rabbis and Jewish associations support their recognition as descendants of the "Lost Tribes of Israel". In the 2000s, the Lemba Cultural Association approached the South African Jewish Board of Deputies, asking for the Lemba to be recognized as Jews by the Jewish community. The Lemba Association complained that "we like many non-European Jews are simply the victims of racism at the hands of the European Jewish establishment worldwide". They threatened to start a campaign to "protest and ultimately destroy 'Jewish apartheid'".

In Apartheid South Africa, the Lemba were not recognized as an ethnic group which was distinct from other black South Africans. The Lemba Cultural Association face misconceptions about their goals such as the belief that the Lemba identify more with European Judaism, the belief that they aim to affiliate with European Jewry rather than other black Jews, and the belief that they are distanced from South African politics. However, while the Lemba do identify with their religious Judaism, many practice Christianity as well.

According to Gideon Shimoni, in his book, Community and Conscience: The Jews in Apartheid South Africa (2003): "In terms of halakha the Lemba are not at all comparable to the Falasha (Note: The term Falasha is now considered derogatory and the name Beta Israel is preferred.) [of Ethiopia]. As a group they have no conceivable status in Judaism."

Rabbi Bernhard of South Africa has stated that the only way for a member of the Lemba tribe to be recognised as a Jew is to undergo the formal Halakhic conversion process. After that, the person "would be welcomed with open arms."

In May 2013, the Harare Lemba Synagogue was established in a rental building in Bluffhill, Harare, Zimbabwe with the assistance from Kulanu (organization)

As of 2015, the Lemba were building their first synagogue in Great Zimbabwe, Mapakomhere, in Masvingo District.

== Culture ==
The Lemba are divided into 12 primary clans:

1. Dumah
2. Hamisi
3. Bakari
4. Sulaymani
5. Tobakare / Tobakale
6. Mani
7. Haji
8. Sadiqi
9. Sharifu
10. Hasani
11. Madi
12. Manga

There are various different transliterations of these primary clans depending on location.

=== Marriage ===
The Lemba follow strict endogamous marriage practices, discouraging unions between Lemba and non-Lemba; mostly against tribes they live amongst (which they collectively refer to as Senji). Endogamy is also common among many groups.

=== Lemba's role in Southern African society ===
According to Tooke, in the 19th and early 20th centuries, the Lemba were highly esteemed for their mining and metalwork skills by the surrounding tribes which lived in the Soutpansberg region of South Africa. He wrote in his 1937 book that the other tribes considered the Lemba outsiders. According to articles which were written during the early 1930s, in the 1920s, the Lemba's medical knowledge earned them respect among tribes in South Africa. Parfitt believes that colonial Europeans had their own reasons for considering some tribes rather than other tribes indigenous to Africa, because they made the British believe that they had a right to be on the continent just like other migrants. Modern Y-DNA evidence confirms the extra-African origin of some of the Lemba's male ancestors. By contrast, mitochondrial DNA evidence confirms the exclusively African origin of most of the Lemba's female ancestors.

=== Sacred ngoma ===
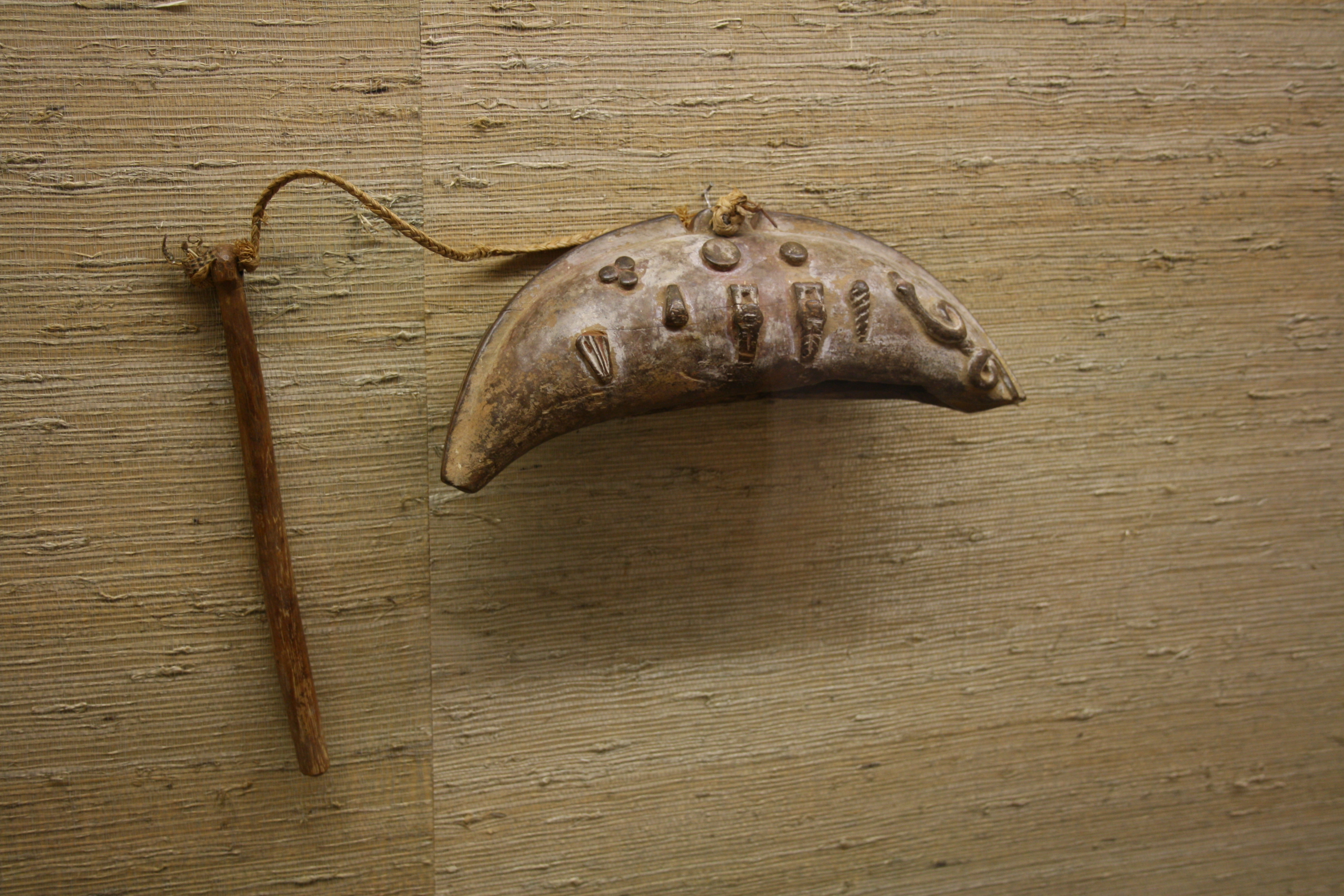
Small drum from Congo in the Royal Museum for Central Africa, Tervuren, Belgium

Lemba tradition tells of a sacred object, the Ngoma Lungundu or the "drum that thunders", which they brought from the place which was called Sena. Their oral history claims that the ngoma was the biblical Ark of the Covenant which was made by Moses. Parfitt, a professor at SOAS, University of London, wrote a book in 2008, The Lost Ark of the Covenant about the rediscovery of this object. His book was adapted into a television documentary that aired on the History Channel, tracing the Lemba's claim that the ngoma lungunda was the legendary Ark of the Covenant. Following the lead of eighth-century accounts of the Ark in Arabia, Parfitt learned of a ghost town which was named Sena in the Hadhramaut.

Parfitt has suggested that the ngoma was related to the Ark of the Covenant, lost in Jerusalem after the city's destruction by the Babylonian king Nebuchadnezzar II in 587 BC. He believes that the ngoma is a descendant of the biblical Ark, which may have been destroyed or may have been repaired when more material was added to it as the artifact began to wear out. He says that the ark/ngoma was carried to Africa by its priestly guardians. The Lemba people's oral history claims that the Ark exploded 700 years ago, and was rebuilt on its remains.

Parfitt claims that he discovered the ngoma in a museum in Harare, Zimbabwe in 2007. It had last been exhibited in 1949 by colonial officials in Bulawayo. They took it to Harare for protection during the struggle for independence, and it was later misplaced inside the museum. Parfitt said he believed that the ngoma was the oldest wooden artifact in Zimbabwe. In February 2010, the 'Lemba ngoma lungundu' was put on display in the museum, along with a celebration of both its history and the history of the Lemba.

Parfitt says that the ngoma/ark was carried into battles. If it broke apart, it was rebuilt. The ngoma, he says, was possibly built from the remains of the original Ark. "So it's the closest descendant of the Ark that we know of," Parfitt says. "Many people say that the story is far-fetched, but the oral traditions of the Lemba have been backed up by science", he said. The ngoma was on display in the Zimbabwe Museum of Human Sciences, but in 2008, it disappeared. The story of Parfitt and the ngoma was updated in 2014 in the ZDF documentary "Tudor Parfitt and the Lost Tribe of Israel"

The Lemba did not touch the ngoma because they considered it an intensely sacred object. It was carried by poles which were inserted into rings which were attached to each side of the ngoma. The only members of the tribe who were permitted to approach it were the male members of its hereditary priesthood because it was their responsibility to guard it. Other Lemba feared that if they ever touched it, they would be "struck down by the fire of God" which would erupt from the object. The Lemba continue to regard the ngoma as the sacred Ark.

== Links to Judaism ==
Many pre-modern Lemba beliefs and practices have been tentatively linked to Abrahamic religions. Ebrahim Moosa wrote that, "Historians of religion have found among the Lemba certain religious and cultural practices which unmistakably resemble Middle Eastern rituals, and there are reflections of Hebrew and Arabic in their language."

According to Rudo Mathivha, a Lemba of South Africa, practices and beliefs which are related to Judaism include the following:

- They observe Shabbat.
- They praise Nwali (a deity) for looking after the Lemba, and they identify themselves as part of the chosen people.
- They teach their children to honour their mothers and fathers. (This is common to many ethnicities and religions.)
- They refrain from eating pig and other beasts which are forbidden by the Torah, and they forbid certain combinations of permitted foods.
- They practice ritual animal slaughter and ritual preparation of meat for consumption, a Middle Eastern practice rather than one which is common to African ethnicities.
- They practice male circumcision; according to Junod's work in 1927, surrounding tribes regarded the Lemba as the masters and originators of that practice with their circumcision ceremonies involving recitations in Hebrew, Arabic and Kiswahili
- Traditionally, the Lemba are buried facing North (towards Jerusalem, as Zimbabwe is in the Southern Hemisphere) and stones are placed on tombs at the funeral.
- Since the late 20th century and due to an increasing amount of interest in their possible Jewish ancestry, they have placed Stars of David on their tombstones.
- Lemba are discouraged from marrying non-Lemba.

Some of these practices and traditions are not exclusively Jewish; they are common to Muslims in the Middle East and Africa, and they are also common to other African tribes and other non-African peoples. In the late 1930s, W. D. Hammond-Tooke wrote a book in which he identified Lemba practices that are similar to those of Arab Muslims: for instance, their practice of endogamy codified by Muslims and Jews, as are certain dietary restrictions. There are many similarities between Lemba and Jewish animal slaughter. Known to the Lemba as kuShisha (derived from the term Shechita), only a circumcised Lemba man who adheres to kashrut may slaughter an animal. If a non-Lemba or non-circumcised male kills the animal, even if it is killed within the same manner as the Lemba, the wider community cannot eat the meat. The Lemba also engage in ritual drinking, especially on high holidays. Considering the Lemba's strict adherence to dietary and custom laws, if they were descendants of Muslims, it would be unlikely that they would partake of such activities, considering that it is considered haram, suggesting closer links to Judaism than Islam.

In the late 20th century, the British scholar Tudor Parfitt, an expert on marginalized Jewish groups, became involved in researching the Lemba's claims. He helped trace the origin of their ancestors back to Senna, an ancient city which they believe was located on the Arabian Peninsula, in present-day Yemen. In an interview which was featured on NOVA in 2000, Parfitt said he was struck by the Lemba's maintenance of rituals which seemed Semitic and Judaic/Islamic:

The other thing was the extraordinary importance they placed upon ritual slaughter of animals, which is not an African thing at all. Of course, it's Islamic as well as Judaic, but it's certainly from the Middle East, it's not African. And the fact that every lad was given a knife with which he did his ritual throughout his life and took to his grave. That seemed to me to be remarkably, tangibly Semitic Middle Eastern.

In a 1931 article H.A. Stayt described them as an Arabic-Bantu tribe with Armenoid features, with on average, longer and thinner faces than that of the average Bantu, their lips are thinner, their noses longer and more aquiline and their eyes smaller, darker and deeper-set.

== Genetics ==
=== Uniparental DNA ===
According to Y chromosome studies by Amanda B. Spurdle & Trefor Jenkins (1996), Mark G. Thomas et al. (2000), and Himla Soodyall (2013), the Lemba are paternally most closely related to Semitic-speaking populations in Western Asia (Haplogroup J = 51.7%); as well as Central Asians and South Asians (LT,K,R,F = 24.5%); with minor contributions from Bantu speaking males.

The study by Thomas et al. (2000) revealed that a substantial number of Lemba men carry a particular haplotype of the Y-chromosome which is known as the Cohen modal haplotype (CMH), as well as a haplogroup of Y-DNA Haplogroup J which is found in some Jews, as well as in other populations which live across the Middle East and Arabia.

Among Jews, the CMH marker is most prevalent in Kohanim, or hereditary priests. As recounted in Lemba oral tradition, members of the Buba clan "had a leadership role in bringing the Lemba out of Israel". The genetic study found that 50% of the males in the Buba clan had the Cohen marker, a proportion which is higher than that which is found in the general Jewish population.

In order to more specifically define the Lemba people's origins, in 2002 Parfitt and other researchers conducted a larger study in order to compare additional Lemba subjects (whose clans were recorded) with males from South Arabia and Africa, as well as Ashkenazi and Sephardi Jews. They found that significant similarities exist between the markers of the Lemba and the markers of the men of the Ḥaḍramawt in Yemen. They also learned that the population of Sena, Yemen was relatively recent, so its members and the Lemba would not have shared common ancestors.

More recently, Mendez et al. (2011) observed that a moderately high frequency of the studied Lemba samples carried Y-DNA Haplogroup T, which is also considered to be of Near Eastern origin. The Lemba T carriers exclusively belonged to T1b, which is rare and was not sampled in Mizrahi Jews of either the Near East or North Africa. T1b has been observed in low frequencies in Ashkenazi Jews as well as in a few Levantine populations. Some Lemba women have also carried markers denoting descendance from the Near East.

A study conducted by Himla Soodyall (2013) observed that the non-African Y component in the Lemba is around 73.7% to 79.6%. However, overall, the study shows that Y chromosomes which are typically linked to Jewish ancestry were not detected through higher resolution analysis. It seems more likely that Arab traders, who are known to have established long-distance trade networks which stretched thousands of kilometers along the western rim of the Indian Ocean, from Sofala in the south to the Red Sea in the north and beyond, to the Hadramut, to India, and even to China from about 900 AD, are more likely linked with the ancestry of the non-African founding males of the Lemba/Remba.

In a 2016 publication, Himla Soodyall and Jennifer G. R Kromberg state that:

When blood groups and serum protein markers were used, the Lemba were indistinguishable from the neighbors among whom they lived; the same was true for mitochondrial DNA which represented the input of females in their gene pool. However, the Y chromosomes, which represented their history through male contributions, showed the link to non-African ancestors. When trying to elucidate the most likely geographic region of origin of the non-African Y chromosomes in the Lemba, the best that could be done was to narrow it to the Middle Eastern region. While no evidence of the extended CMH 11 was found in the higher resolution study, CMH however, was present at a rate of 8.8% being one mutational step away from the extended form.

== Representation in other media ==
- Channel Four documentary based on Parfitt's Journey to the Vanished City (1992 first edition).
- PBS Nova documentary: Lost Tribes of Israel, includes content about the Lemba. Website includes transcript of an interview with Tudor Parfitt based on his work with them.
- William Rasdell, a researcher, photographer, and visual artist developed the JAD photographic field study that outfits Lemba people of Zimbabwe with a point-and-shoot camera to document aspects of their daily lives.
- Jewish Journal: A Passover Seder in Rural Zimbabwe?
- Aljazeera article: Zimbabwe's Lemba build synagogue details the efforts of the Lemba to reengage in religious Judaism within the community
- Mickey Feinberg: Zimbabwe with love detailing his stay amongst the Lemba of Harare

== See also ==
- Genetic history of Africa
- Genetic studies of Jews
- Great Zimbabwe
- Groups claiming affiliation with Israelites
- History of the Jews in Africa
- Islam in Africa
- Islam in South Africa
- Islam in Zimbabwe
- Jewish diaspora
- Jewish ethnic divisions
