= Harald Philip Hans von Sicard =

Harald Philip Hans von Sicard (born 17 May 1900) was a German-Russian-Swedish missiologist, ethnographer and folklorist. He was one of the pioneer scholars on Great Zimbabwe. He was awarded an honorary doctorate for his publications on its archeology and history as well as other topics. He is the father of the specialist on Christian-Muslim relations, Sigvard von Sicard.

== Early life and education ==
Von Sicard was born in St. Petersburg, Russia, the second son of bank clerk Ernst Heinrich von Sicard and Marie Amalie Westrén-Doll, a German father and Estonian mother.

Von Sicard grew up in imperial Russia and attended St. Catherine's Secondary School in St. Petersburg. He graduated in 1918 with the Golden Medal award. He was registered in 1918 in the Faculty of Theology at the University of Dorpat (Tartu), Estonia, before moving to the University of Greifswald, Germany, in 1919. He continued his theological studies in the University of Berlin from 1921, graduating with a BTh degree in 1923. In 1925, he undertook further theological studies at the University of Uppsala, Sweden, in preparation for his ordination as a priest in the Church of Sweden.

== Ministry ==
Von Sicard was ordained in Uppsala in 1925 and accepted as a missionary by the Church of Sweden Mission in 1926 and sent to Kingsmead College, a component of the Selly Oak Colleges in Birmingham, England, to prepare for service in Southern Rhodesia (now Zimbabwe). This was followed by a period of Shona language studies at the Dutch Reformed Church Morgenster Mission, near the Zimbabwe ruins.

After language studies, he was posted to Masase Mission in the Berengwa District where he met the Swedish Nurse/Midwife Karin Margareta Lindgren. They were married in 1929. After a home leave during 1931 and 1932, he was put in charge of the new mission at Gomotutu, also in the Berengwa District. He returned to Sweden in 1938 where he undertook research during the early years of World War II.

In 1943, he was requested by the Church of Sweden to travel to the US to consult with the American Lutheran Missions on behalf of the orphaned German Missions in East Africa. He was posted to Masase Mission between the years of 1944-1949. During 1951-1955, he was posted to start new work in the Beitbridge area. In 1957, he was promoted to Dean in the Evangelical Lutheran Church in Southern Rhodesia (now Zimbabwe).

== Honours ==
Awarded ThD h.c. by the University of Uppsala for his missiological, ethnographic and folkloristic work.

Awarded the Ordre des Palmes académiques by the French Government in 1959

Awarded the Order of the North Star by the Swedish Government in 1961

== Research and selected publications ==
von Sicard's main interests were in areas of history, both oral and written, folklore, and theology of mission with particular interest in Africa:

- Ngoma Lungundu, eine afrikanische Bundeslade. Studia Ethographica Upsaliensis, vol. 5, 1952.
- Den kristna missionens historia. With K. B. Westman. Stockholm: Svenska Kyrkans Diakonistyrelses Bokförlag 1960. Translated and published as Geschichte der christlichen Mission. München: Chr. Kaiser Verlag, 1962.
- Ngano dze Cikaranga/Karanga Märchen. Studia Ethographica Upsaliensis, vol 23, 1965.
- Contos dos Quicos. Recolhidos e traduzidos por João Vicente Martins. Vorwort, Einleitung, Kommentar, Literatur – Namen- und Sachverzeichnis von Harald de Sicard. Lisboa: Companhia de Diamantes de Angola, 1971.
- Numerous articles for peer-reviewed journals.
