= Sena, Yemen =

Sena صناء 𐩮𐩬𐩱
- Sana
- Location in Yemen
- Coordinates: 16°5′25.9″N 49°39′19.48″E
- Country: Yemen
- Governorate: Hadhramaut

Sena, officially known as Sana, (Yemeni Arabic: صناء, IPA: [sˤɑnaːʔ]; Old South Arabian: 𐩮𐩬𐩱 ṣnʾ) is an ancient abandoned town in Yemen located in the remote eastern Hadramaut valley. This village is distinct from the similarly named capital of Yemen, Sana'a (Arabic), and the town of Sanāw in Oman.

The locality of Sena is frequently mentioned in the history of the Lemba people; who patrilineally primarily descend from Ancient Semitic traders who migrated to Africa and intermarried with Bantu women somewhere along the Swahili Coast, who then migrated both interolaterally and southwards into Southern Africa.
