= HMS Cockade =

C-class destroyer

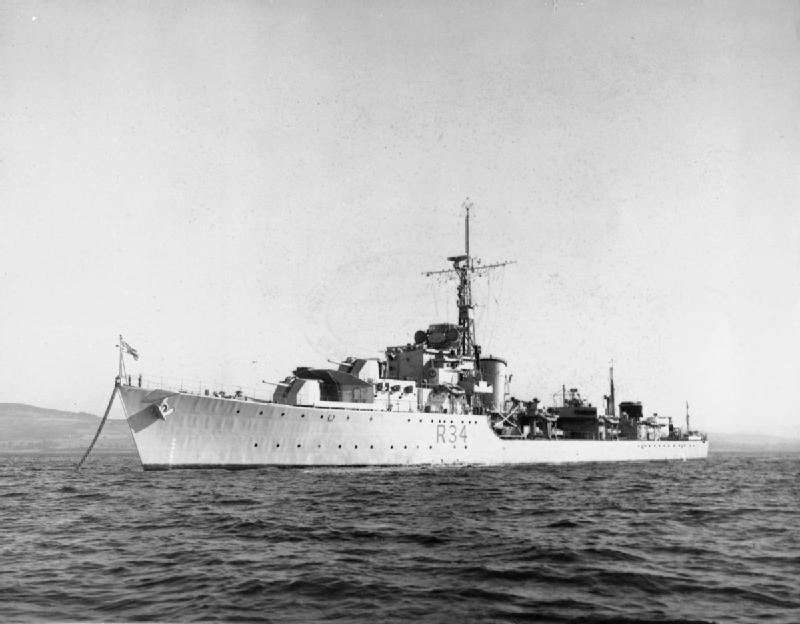

History

United Kingdom
- Name: HMS Cockade
- Builder: Yarrow Shipbuilders
- Laid down: 11 March 1943
- Launched: 1 March 1944
- Commissioned: 29 September 1945
- Decommissioned: 1958
- Identification: Pennant number: R34 later changed to D34
- Fate: Arrived at Cashmore, Newport July 1964 for breaking

General characteristics
- Class & type: C-class destroyer
- Displacement: 1,885 tons (1,915 tonnes); 2,545 tons full (2,585 tonnes)
- Length: 362.75 ft (110.57 m) o/a
- Beam: 35.75 ft (10.90 m)
- Draught: 11.75 ft (3.58 m)
- Propulsion: 2 Admiralty 3-drum boilers, Parsons single-reduction geared steam turbines, 40,000 shp (29.8 MW), 2 shafts
- Speed: 36 knots (67 km/h) / 32 knots (59 km/h) full
- Range: 4,675 nmi (8,658 km) at 20 knots (37 km/h); 1,400 nmi (2,600 km) at 32 knots (59 km/h)
- Complement: 186
- Sensors & processing systems: Radar Type 275 fire control on director Mk.VI
- Armament: 4 × QF 4.5 in (114 mm) L/45 guns Mark IV on mounts CP Mk.V; 2 × Bofors 40 mm L/60 guns on twin mount "Hazemeyer" Mk.IV; 4 × anti-aircraft mountings; Single Bofors 40 mm Mk.III; Single QF 2 - pdr Mk.VIII Mk.XVI; Single Oerlikon 20 mm P Mk.III; Twin Oerlikon 20 mm Mk.V; 8 (2x4) tubes for 21 inch (533 mm) torpedoes Mk.IX; 4 throwers and 2 racks for 96 depth charges

HMS Cockade was a C-class destroyer of the United Kingdom's Royal Navy. A cockade is a knot of ribbons, or other circular- or oval-shaped symbol of distinctive colours which is usually worn on a hat. So far she has been the only ship of the Royal Navy to bear the name.

Cockade was launched on 1 March 1944 and commissioned on 29 September 1945.

== Design and construction ==
The C class were War Emergency Programme destroyers, intended for general duties, including use as anti-submarine escort, and were to be suitable for mass-production. They were based on the hull and machinery of the pre-war J-class destroyers, but with a lighter armament (effectively whatever armament was available) in order to speed production. The 'Co' sub-class of eight ships formed the 13th Emergency Flotilla, one of three flotillas of War Emergency destroyers ordered under the 1942 War Construction Programme (the 'Ch', 'Co' and 'Cr' sub-classes (24 destroyers)) along with 16 of the larger Battle-class destroyer.

The Co-class were 362 feet 9 inches (110.57 m) long overall, 348 feet 0 inches (106.07 m) at the waterline and 339 feet 6 inches (103.48 m) between perpendiculars, with a beam of 35 feet 8 inches (10.87 m) and a draught of 10 feet 6 inches (3.20 m) mean and 14 feet 6 inches (4.42 m) full load. Displacement was 1,870 long tons (1,900 t) standard and 2,505 long tons (2,545 t) full load. Two Admiralty 3-drum water-tube boilers supplied steam at 300 pounds per square inch (2,100 kPa) and 630 °F (332 °C) to two sets of Parsons single-reduction geared steam turbines, which drove two propeller shafts. The machinery was rated at 40,000 shaft horsepower (30,000 kW) giving a maximum speed of 36 knots (41 mph; 67 km/h) and 32 knots (37 mph; 59 km/h) at full load. 615 tons of oil were carried, giving a range of 4,675 nautical miles (5,380 mi; 8,658 km) at 20 knots (23 mph; 37 km/h).

The ship had a main gun armament of four 4.5-inch (120 mm) QF Mk. IV guns, capable of elevating to an angle of 55 degrees, giving a degree of anti-aircraft capability. The close-in anti-aircraft armament was one Hazemayer stabilised twin mount for the Bofors 40 mm gun, two single 2-pounder (40 mm) "pom-pom"s and two Oerlikon 20 mm cannons. One quadruple mount for 21-inch (533 mm) torpedoes was fitted, while the ship had a depth charge outfit of two depth charge mortars, with a total of 35 charges carried. She had a crew of 186 officers and other ranks.

Cockade was fitted with a Type 293 air/surface warning radar on the ship's lattice foremast, together with a Type 291 air warning radar on a pole mast aft. A Type 275 fire control radar was integrated with the ship's Mk VI HA/LA gun director, while the Hazemayer mount had an integrated Type 282 radar.

Cockade underwent a modernisaton in 1952. One of her 4.5 inch guns was removed and replaced by a double Squid anti-submarine mortar, while the ship's sensor fit was updated, with modified sonar and Type 974 surface warning radar fitted.

Cockade was ordered on 12 September 1942, and was laid down at Yarrow's Scotstoun shipyard on 11 March 1943. She was launched on 7 March 1944 and commissioned on 29 September 1945.

== Service ==
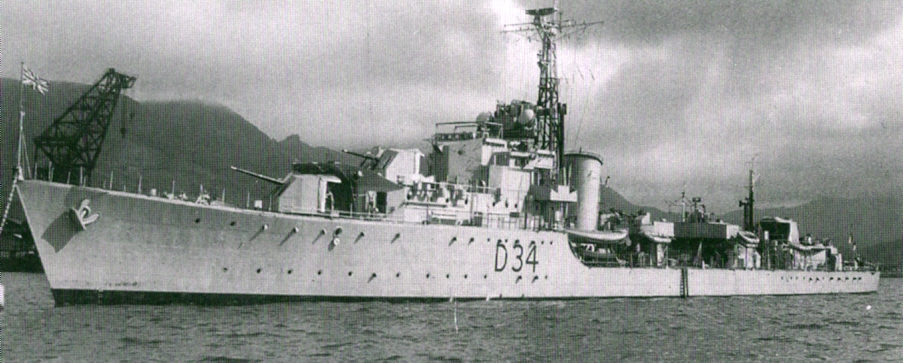
Cockade at Sasebo, Japan, in July 1950.

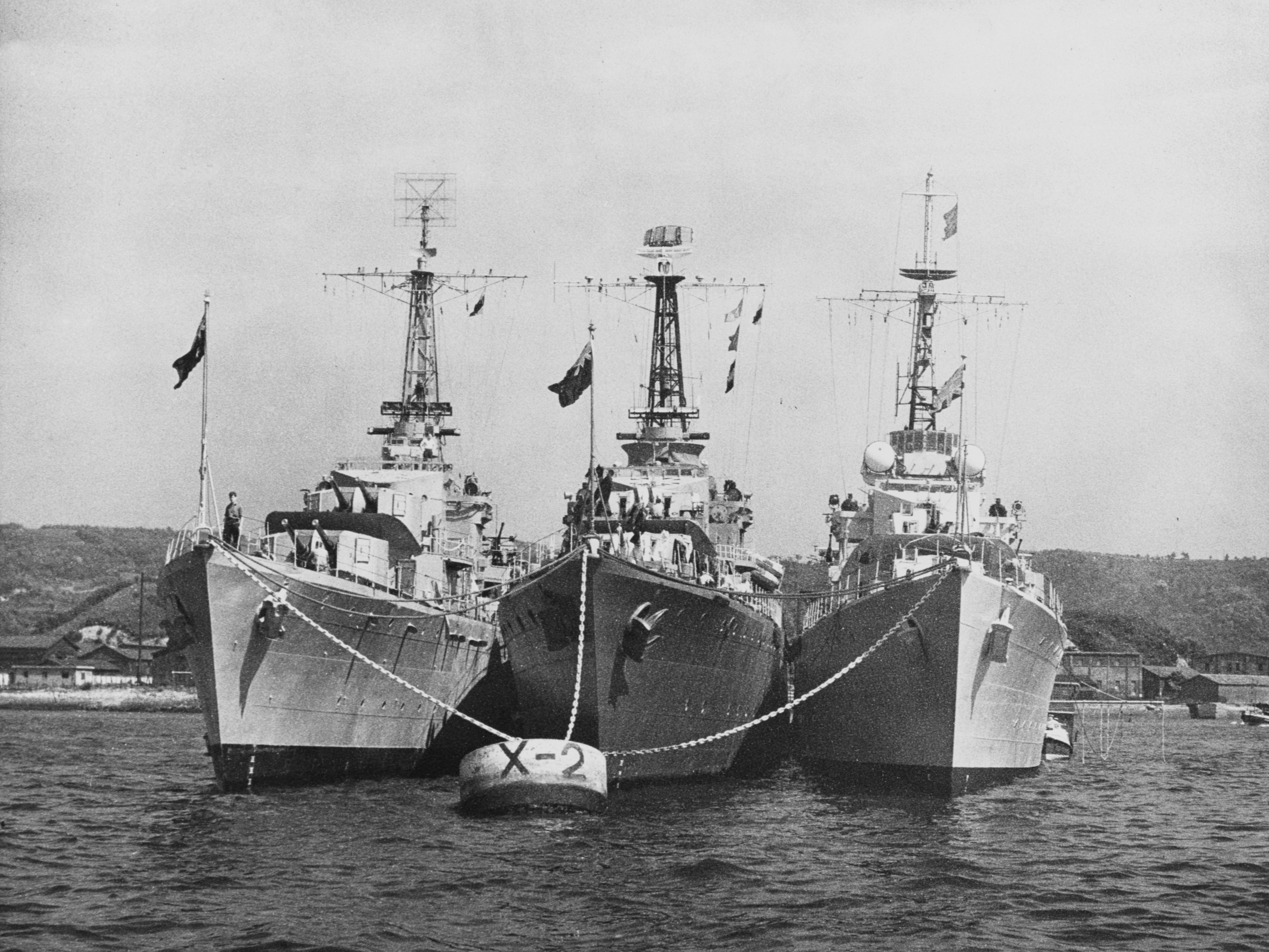
Cockade (right) in 1951, with HMAS Warramunga (left) and HMCS Nootka (centre)

Like all the War Emergency Destroyers ordered under the 1942 construction programme, delays in delivery of the ships fire-control director tower meant that Cockade commissioned too late to see service in the Second World War. She was initially allocated the pennant number R34, although this was later changed to D34. Her first commanding officer was Lt Cdr Terence Desmond Herrick, DSC RN.

After working up, Cockade was deployed to the Far East, joining the 8th Destroyer Flotilla in 1946. While on passage back to the UK from the Far East in December 1947, Cockade and sister ship Contest were diverted to Aden in response to anti-Jewish rioting, with men from the two destroyers and the survey ship Challenger being landed to try to restore order. On return to the UK, Cockade was used as an air target ship operating out of Plymouth. She returned to the Far East in early 1950, again joining the 8th Destroyer Flotilla. Like the rest of the 8th Flotilla, Cockade subsequently saw service in the Korean War, taking part in escort, patrol and shore bombardment duties. Whilst there she also visited Singapore and Japan.

Cockade's initial deployment to Korea was from July to November 1950, where she formed part of the West Korea Support Element of the US-commanded Task Group 96.5. On 2 August 1950, Cockade and sister ship Cossack bombarded Mokpo, damaging docks and railway sidings. In September and October that year, Cockade provided gunfire support off Wonsan, and on 30 September to 2 October Cockade and the cruise Ceylon bombarded the North Korean garrison of Baengnyeongdo island, with Cockade sinking three floating mines during the operation. Cockade's next deployment was from March and August 1951. On 7 April she picked up a United States Air Force pilot who had been shot down behind the front lines three months earlier and hidden by Korean civilians. On 6–7 May, Cockade, together with the American cruiser Helena and destroyers Buck, Fiske and Orleck, provided fire support to South Korean troops around Kosong. Her next deployment to Korea was from October to December 1951. On the night of 30 November/1 December 1951, Cockade was covering the evacuation of troops from the South Korean-held island of Taehwa-to on the Pansong Archipelago when she was hit by gunfire from the shore, killing one rating.

Cockade began her fourth deployment to Korea on 1 February 1952. On 4 February, Cockade and the cruiser Ceylon supported the landings of irregular forces by the landing ships USS LST-516 and USS LST-692 on the island of Mudo-ri. The deployment continued into March, and from 14 April to 2 August Cockade was refitted and modernised at Singapore. Her fifth deployment off Korea was from December 1952 to February 1953 and her fifth from April 1953 to July that year. On 6 May 1953, Cockade bombarded railway targets near Sŏngjin, and was near missed by shore fire, and the next day was again fired on by shore batteries without receiving damage.

On 24 August 1953, while executing the "Formosa Strait Patrol" operation to protect the "peaceful vessels" on the high seas of Taiwan Strait, Cockade answered the radio distress call to come to the assistance of the British mercantile freighter Nigelock (the former Flower-class corvette Nigella), carrying a cargo of vegetable and fruit deliveries from Shanghai to Amoy via the international sea lane, when Nigelock was intercepted by the 4.5-inch shell and machine gunshots from the Republic of China Navy (ROCN) Huangpu (黄浦) PC-105 (a former USS PC-461-class submarine chaser) enforcing ROC's Guanbi policy to blockade the coast of China. Cockade fired a warning shot and signaled Huangpu to turn away, which was praised by the Hong Kong newspapers later as a successful rescue to deter the "piracy". Nigelock had been hijacked by ROCN frigate Chao'an (潮安) PF-74 toward the Magong military port in Penghu the previous week on 16 August, but had been released by the intervention of the frigate St Brides Bay midway.

In 1955, Cockade was deployed in response to the Malayan Emergency, carrying out bombardment duties against Communist insurgents of the Malayan National Liberation Army in south-east Johor, supporting operations by the 1/2 Gurkhas. In November 1956 Cockade was one of several Royal Navy ships to visit Melbourne, Australia for the 1956 Summer Olympics. In December 1956 Cockade visited Bluff and Auckland New Zealand.

In early 1957, Cockade continued to take part in the Malayan Emergency as part of the 8th Destroyer Squadron. On 26 April, during night exercises, a star shell fired by Cockade landed in a gun bay on the Australian destroyer HMAS Tobruk, killing one seaman and severely wounding another. Later in 1957 Cockade was stationed at Hong Kong.

At the end of 1957, on her return journey to Britain, Cockade was diverted to Ceylon (now Sri Lanka) with a cargo of sugar as part of the British response to flooding.

== Decommissioning and disposal ==
Cockade returned to Plymouth from the Far East on 27 January 1958, having steamed over 350,000 nautical miles (650,000 km; 400,000 mi) since her launch, and decommissioned. The destroyer was laid up at Devonport in reserve pending disposal, with duties including acting as an accommodation ship for the frigate Tartar. Following her decommissioning Cockade arrived in June 1964 to John Cashmore Ltd for breaking up at Newport, Wales.

== Bibliography ==
- Blackman, Raymond V. B., ed. (1953). Jane's Fighting Ships 1953–54. New York: McGraw-Hill Book Company Inc.
- Cassells, Vic (2000). The Destroyers: Their Battles and Their Badges. East Roseville, NSW, Australia: Simon & Schuster.
- Colledge, J. J.; Warlow, Ben (2006) [1969]. Ships of the Royal Navy: The Complete Record of All Fighting Ships of the Royal Navy from the 15th Century to the Present (3rd Rev ed.). London: Chatham Publishing. ISBN 978-1-86176-281-8. OCLC 67375475.
- English, John (2008). Obdurate to Daring: British Fleet Destroyers 1941–45. Windsor, UK: World Ship Society. ISBN 978-0-9560769-0-8.
- Friedman, Norman (2008). British Destroyers & Frigates: The Second World War and After. Barnsley, UK: Seaforth Publishing. ISBN 978-1-84832-015-4.
- Gardiner, Robert; Chesneau, Roger, eds. (1980). Conway's All The World's Fighting Ships 1922–1946. London: Conway Maritime Press. ISBN 0-85177-146-7.
- Gardiner, Robert; Chumbley, Stephen, eds. (1995). Conway's All The World's Fighting Ships 1947–1995. Annapolis, Maryland, USA: Naval Institute Press. ISBN 1-55750-132-7.
- Marriott, Leo (1989). Royal Navy Destroyers Since 1945. Ian Allan Ltd. ISBN 0-7110-1817-0.
- Lenton, H. T. (1970). Navies of the Second World War: British Fleet & Escort Destroyers Volume Two. London: Macdonald & Co. ISBN 0-356-03122-5.
- Thursfield, H. G., ed. (1948). Brassey's Naval Annual 1948. New York: The Macmillan Company.
- Whitley, M. J. (2000). Destroyers of World War 2: An International Encyclopedia. London: Cassell & Co. ISBN 1-85409-521-8.
