= HMS Contest (R12) =

C-class destroyer

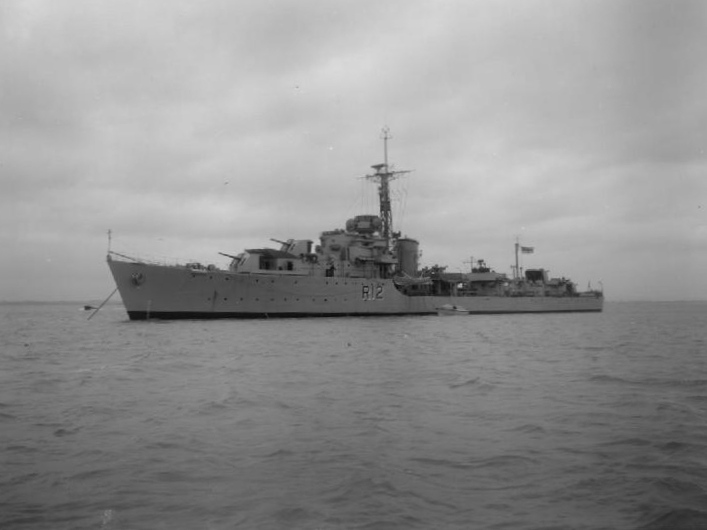
- HMS Contest on the Solent, 8 November 1945

History

United Kingdom
- Name: HMS Contest
- Builder: White, Cowes
- Laid down: 1 November 1943
- Launched: 16 December 1944
- Commissioned: 9 November 1945
- Identification: Pennant number: R12 (later D48)
- Fate: Arrived for breaking up at Thos. W. Ward Grays, Essex on 2 February 1960

General characteristics
- Class & type: C-class destroyer
- Displacement: 1,885 tons (1,915 tonnes); 2,545 tons full (2,585 tonnes)
- Length: 362.75 ft (110.57 m) o/a
- Beam: 35.75 ft (10.90 m)
- Draught: 11.75 ft (3.58 m)
- Propulsion: 2 Admiralty 3-drum boilers, Parsons single-reduction geared steam turbines, 40,000 shp (29.8 MW), 2 shafts
- Speed: 36 knots (67 km/h) / 32 knots (59 km/h) full
- Range: 4,675 nmi (8,658 km) at 20 knots (37 km/h); 1,400 nmi (2,600 km) at 32 knots (59 km/h)
- Complement: 186
- Sensors & processing systems: Radar Type 275 fire control on director Mk.VI
- Armament: 4 × QF 4.5 in (114 mm) L/45 guns Mark IV on mounts CP Mk.V; 2 × Bofors 40 mm L/60 guns on twin mount Mk V; 4 × anti-aircraft mountings; Single Bofors 40 mm Mk.III; Single QF 2 - pdr Mk.VIII Mk.XVI; Single Oerlikon 20 mm P Mk.III; Twin Oerlikon 20 mm Mk.V; 8 (2x4) tubes for 21 inch (533 mm) torpedoes Mk.IX; 4 throwers and 2 racks for 96 depth charges

HMS Contest was a C-class destroyer of the Royal Navy, built by J. Samuel White, Cowes. Laid down on 1 November 1943 and commissioned on 9 November 1945, she was the Royal Navy's first all-welded warship. She was scrapped in 1960.

== Operational service ==
On commissioning Contest served as part of the 8th Destroyer Squadron in the Far East.

In 1947, Contest was ordered to the Solomon Islands as a deterrence against feared violence when the leaders of the Maasina Ruru independence movement were arrested. While on passage back to the UK from the Far East in December 1947, Contest and sister ship Cockade were diverted to Aden in response to anti-Jewish rioting, with men from the two destroyers and the survey ship Challenger being landed to try to restore order. She returned to the UK for a refit in 1948. She was given an interim modernization and was fitted for minelaying. In 1951 she was the Torpedo training ship at Portsmouth. She then served as part of the 6th Destroyer Squadron in the Home Fleet. In 1953 she took part in the Coronation Review of the Fleet to celebrate the Coronation of Queen Elizabeth II.

== Decommissioning and disposal ==
Contest was paid off in the late 1950s. Following her sale she arrived at the breakers yard for scrapping at Thos. W. Ward Grays, Essex on 2 February 1960.

== Bibliography ==
- Colledge, J. J.; Warlow, Ben (2006) [1969]. Ships of the Royal Navy: The Complete Record of All Fighting Ships of the Royal Navy from the 15th Century to the Present (3rd Rev ed.). London: Chatham Publishing. ISBN 978-1-86176-281-8. OCLC 67375475.
- Marriott, Leo (1989). Royal Navy Destroyers Since 1945. Ian Allan Ltd. ISBN 0-7110-1817-0.
- Raven, Alan; Roberts, John (1978). War Built Destroyers O to Z Classes. London: Bivouac Books. ISBN 0-85680-010-4.
- Thursfield, H. G., ed. (1948). Brassey's Naval Annual 1948. New York: The Macmillan Company.
- Whitley, M. J. (1988). Destroyers of World War 2. Annapolis, Maryland: Naval Institute Press. ISBN 0-87021-326-1.
