= Grand Synagogue of Aden =

Former synagogue in Aden, Yemen

- Arabic: كنيس عدن الكبير; Hebrew: בית הכנסת הגדול בעדן
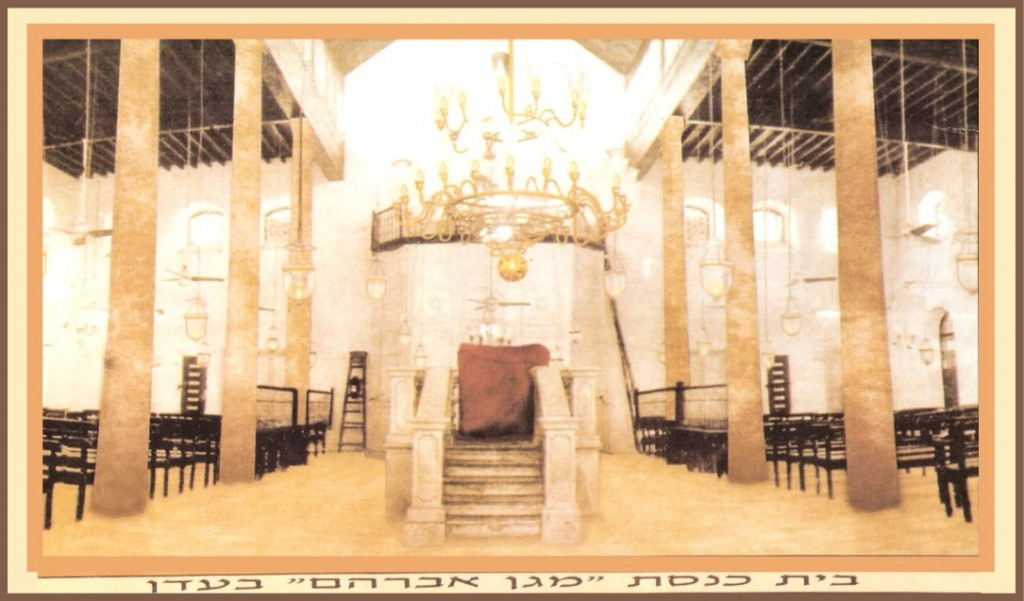
- Interior of synagogue, undated

Religion
- Affiliation: Yemenite Judaism (former)
- Rite: Nusach Aden
- Ecclesiastical or organizational status: Synagogue (1858–1947)
- Status: Destroyed

Location
- Location: Aden
- Country: Yemen

Architecture
- Type: Synagogue architecture
- Funded by: Menahem Messa
- Established: c. 110 BCE
- Completed: 1858
- Destroyed: 1947 anti-Jewish riots in Aden (partial); 1994 Yemeni civil war (complete)

Specifications
- Capacity: 2,000 worshippers
- Materials: Alabaster; marble; stained glass

The Grand Synagogue of Aden (Arabic: كنيس عدن الكبير, romanized: Kanīs ʻAdan al-Kabīr; Hebrew: בית הכנסת הגדול בעדן, romanized: Beit HaKnesset HaGadol BaꞋAden), also known as the Magen Avraham Synagogue or Shield of Avraham Synagogue, was a synagogue, located in Aden, Yemen.

The congregation is believed to have been established in c. 110 BCE. The synagogue was completed in 1858, built on the site of an earlier synagogue. The synagogue was abandoned during the 1947 anti-Jewish riots in Aden and destroyed in 1994, during the Yemeni civil war.

== History ==
The synagogue was completed in 1858, having been funded by Menahem Messa. It was large enough to house over 2,000 worshipers. The pulpit was made of marble – pure, white and polished, with 7 marble steps leading up to it. The floor was made of marble sections, patterned black and white as on a chess board. The ark was built into the wall pile or stack, and covered by six curtains woven with silk and interwoven with gleaming sapphires, above them the crowns of the Torah. The Torah scrolls were adorned with crowns and pomegranates, some of them gold, and some of them pure refined silver.

The two tablets of The Ten Commandments, on both sides of the doors, were made of polished silver. The huge ceiling was supported by eight wooden columns, four on each side. Each column had a radius of 200 cm (80 in) and were 12 m (40 ft) high. The ceiling and the numerous windows are replete with stained glass in blazing colour and dozens of lanterns.

Along the eastern wall was a women's section with 200 places. The entrance to the synagogue was through a huge courtyard which also served as a place of worship on Sabbath and the high holy days. A mikvah was also built on the southern side of the synagogue.

The synagogue was partially destroyed in 1947 and completely destroyed in 1994.

== See also ==
- History of the Jews in Aden
- Jews of Hadramaut
- Habbani Jews
- History of the Jews in the Arabian Peninsula
- Jewish exodus from Arab lands
- Yemenite Jews
