= SS Nancy Moller =

A number of steamships were named Nancy Moller, including –

- SS Nancy Moller (1907), purchased in 1934, torpedoed and sunk by Japanese submarine I-165 on 18 March 1944.
- SS Nancy Moller (1919), in service until 1921 when sold and renamed Hen Li.
- SS Nancy Moller (1943), in service under that name during 1951.
