= Asmara Synagogue =

Orthodox synagogue in Asmara, Eritrea

- Tigrinya: ምኩራብ ኣስመራ; Hebrew: בית הכנסת של אסמרה; Arabic: معبد أسمرا
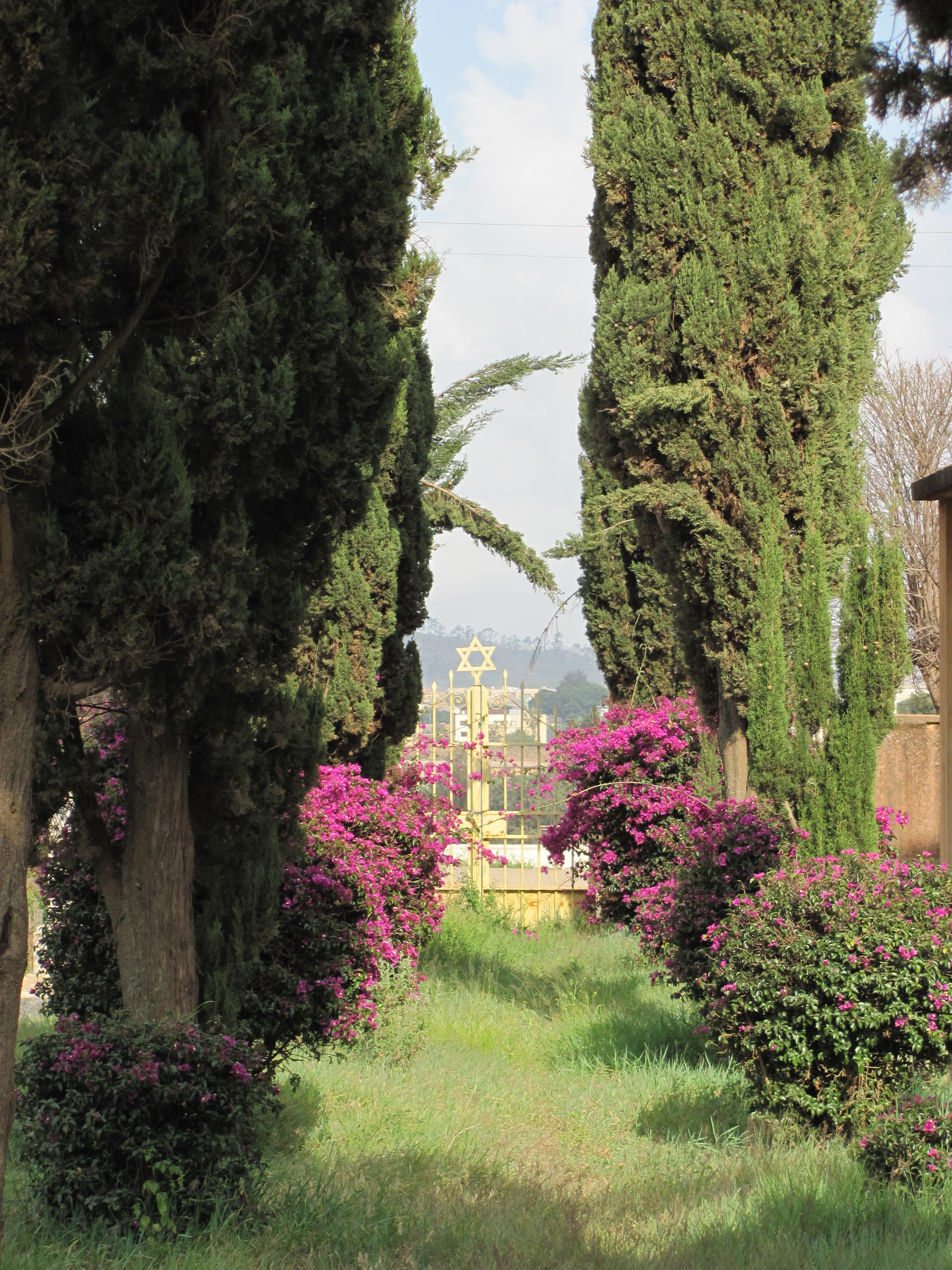

- Location of the synagogue in Eritrea

Religion
- Affiliation: Orthodox Judaism
- Ecclesiastical or organisational status: Synagogue
- Status: Active

Location
- Location: Haile Mariam Mammo Street, Asmara
- Country: Eritrea
- Coordinates: 15°20′14″N 38°56′27″E

Architecture
- Completed: 1906

The Asmara Synagogue (Tigrinya: ምኩራብ ኣስመራ, romanized: mǝkurāb āsǝmarā; Hebrew: בית הכנסת של אסמרה, romanized: beit hakneset shel asmara; Arabic: معبد أسمرا, romanized: maebad 'asmara) is an Orthodox Jewish congregation and synagogue, located in Asmara, Eritrea. Completed in 1906, the synagogue in the only surviving remnant of the Jewish community in Eritrea.

== History ==
Built in 1906, the synagogue includes a Jewish cemetery, classrooms, and a main sanctuary. All aspects of the synagogue are managed by Samuel Cohen, an Asmara native who remained in the country to look after the edifice. The congregation was founded in 1906 by Yemenite Jewish immigrants from Aden. Along with the Adeni Jews, some congregants were Italian Jews. Others were refugees from Nazi Germany.

== See also ==
- History of the Jews in Eritrea
