= HMS Challenger (1931) =

Royal Navy survey ship (1931–1954)

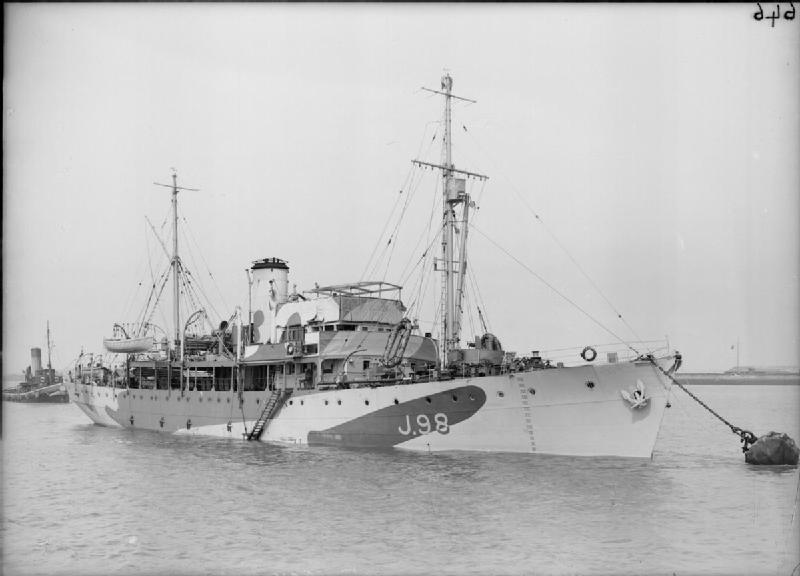

History

United Kingdom
- Name: HMS Challenger
- Builder: Chatham Dockyard
- Laid down: 1930
- Launched: 1 June 1931
- Commissioned: 15 March 1932
- Decommissioned: January 1954
- Fate: Scrapped

General characteristics
- Type: survey ship
- Displacement: 1,140 tons
- Length: 220 ft (67 m)
- Beam: 36 ft (11 m)
- Draught: 12 ft 6 in (3.81 m)
- Speed: 12.5 knots (23.2 km/h; 14.4 mph)
- Complement: 84
- Armament: None

HMS Challenger was a survey ship of the United Kingdom's Royal Navy associated with the discovery of Challenger Deep, the deepest point in the oceans. She was laid down in 1930 at Chatham Dockyard and built in a dry dock, before being moved to Portsmouth for completion and commissioning on 15 March 1932.

== Service history ==
=== Pre-war surveys ===
Until the outbreak of the Second World War, Challenger surveyed the waters around the United Kingdom, Labrador, the West Indies, and the East Indies. On 23 September 1932, she struck a rock 6 nautical miles (11 km) north of Ford's Harbour, Labrador, in the Dominion of Newfoundland (56°28′30″N 61°10′00″W) and was beached. She was later refloated.

=== World War 2 convoys ===
From 1939 to 1942 she served in home waters and as a convoy escort. On 11 January 1941 she was bombed, suffering at least 4 deaths on board. In June and July 1941 she and three Flower-class corvettes escorted the troop ship Anselm from Britain en route for Freetown, Sierra Leone. When the troop ship was torpedoed north of the Azores, Challenger and the corvette HMS Starwort rescued hundreds of survivors and then transferred them to the armed merchant cruiser HMS Cathay.

=== Post-war surveys ===
From 1942 to 1946 Challenger surveyed in the Indian Ocean and the Western Pacific. She returned to Chatham in 1946 for a refit before returning to the Persian Gulf in late 1946. She left the Gulf in 1947 and went to Cyprus where a shore party logged tides. She then proceeded to Gibraltar for another refit in dry dock.

In December 1947 men from Challenger and from the two destroyers Cockade and Contest were landed in Aden in an attempt to restore order following anti-Jewish rioting.

=== Circumnavigation ===
She circumnavigated the world from 1950 to 1953, surveying in the West Indies and the Far East. It was on this mission in 1951 that Challenger surveyed the Mariana Trench near Guam, identifying the deepest known point in the oceans, 11,033 metres (36,198 ft) deep at its maximum, near 11°21′N 142°12′E. This point was named Challenger Deep, in recognition of the fact that, as the mission's Chief Scientist Thomas Gaskell explained,

[it] was not more than 50 miles from the spot where the nineteenth-century Challenger found her deepest depth [...] and it may be thought fitting that a ship with the name Challenger should put the seal on the work of that great pioneering expedition of oceanography.

In January 1954, Challenger returned to Britain, was paid off, and was broken up at Dover.

== Sources ==
- Gaskell, T.F. (18 March 1954). "Seismic Refraction Work by H.M.S. Challenger in the Deep Oceans". Proceedings of the Royal Society of London. Series A, Mathematical and Physical Sciences. 222 (1150): 356–361. Bibcode:1954RSPSA.222..356G. doi:10.1098/rspa.1954.0079.
- Gaskell, Thomas Frohock (1960). "Voyages of HMS Challenger II". Under The Deep Oceans: Twentieth Century Voyages of Discovery. New York: Norton.
- Ritchie, George Stephen (1958), Challenger the life of a survey ship, New York: Abelard-Schuman, OL 6245841M
- Thursfield, H. G., ed. (1948). Brassey's Naval Annual 1948. New York: The Macmillan Company.
- Wyatt, A.G.N. (July 1934). "Surveying Cruises of H.M.S.Challenger off the Coast of Labrador in 1932 and 1933". Journal of the Geographical Society. 84 (1): 33–53. Bibcode:1934GeogJ..84...33W. doi:10.2307/1786831. JSTOR 1786831.
