= HMS Cossack (R57) =

C-class destroyer

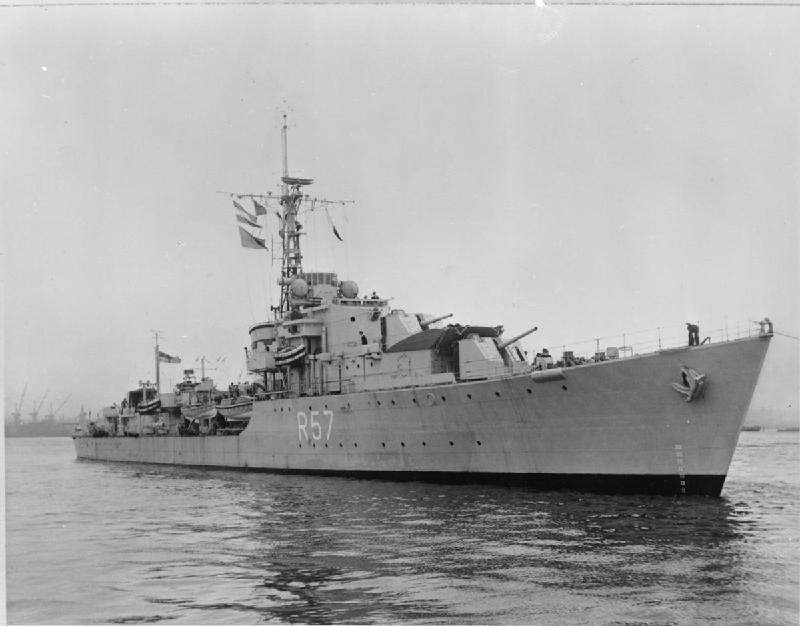
- HMS Cossack in 1945

History

United Kingdom
- Name: HMS Cossack
- Builder: Vickers-Armstrongs, High Walker
- Launched: 10 May 1944
- Identification: Pennant number: R57
- Fate: Scrapped on 1 March 1961

General characteristics
- Class & type: C-class destroyer
- Displacement: 1,885 tons (1,915 tonnes); 2,545 tons full (2,585 tonnes)
- Length: 362.75 ft (110.57 m) o/a
- Beam: 35.75 ft (10.90 m)
- Draught: 11.75 ft (3.58 m)
- Propulsion: 2 Admiralty 3-drum boilers, Parsons single-reduction geared steam turbines, 40,000 shp (30 MW), 2 shafts
- Speed: 36 knots (67 km/h) / 32 knots (59 km/h) full
- Range: 4,675 nmi (8,658 km) at 20 knots (37 km/h); 1,400 nmi (2,600 km) at 32 knots (59 km/h)
- Complement: 186
- Sensors & processing systems: Radar Type 275 fire control on director Mk.VI
- Armament: 4 × QF 4.5 in (114 mm) L/45 guns Mark IV on mounts CP Mk.V; 2 × Bofors 40 mm L/60 guns on twin mount "Hazemeyer" Mk.IV; 4 × anti-aircraft mountings; Single Bofors 40 mm Mk.III; Single QF 2 - pdr Mk.VIII Mk.XVI; Single Oerlikon 20 mm P Mk.III; Twin Oerlikon 20 mm Mk.V; 8 (2x4) tubes for 21 inch (533 mm) torpedoes Mk.IX; 4 throwers and 2 racks for 96 depth charges

HMS Cossack was a Royal Navy C-class destroyer launched on 10 May 1944.

== Operational Service ==
Cossack became leader of the 8th Destroyer Squadron in 1945, remaining leader of the Flotilla until 1956. Between 1950 and 1952 she was commanded by Varyl Begg. She saw action at the Battle of Pusan Perimeter during the Korean War. On 18 May 1951, Cossack intercepted the cargo ship Nancy Moller off Hainan, China. The ship was carrying a cargo of rubber bound for a Chinese port in contravention of a United Nations embargo. Nancy Moller was escorted back to Singapore.

Cossack supported Operation Grapple, the series of British nuclear weapons tests in 1957. On 8 December 1959 she arrived back at Devonport Dockyard after 15 years service in the Far East. The ship was scrapped in 1961.

== Publications ==
- Colledge, J. J.; Warlow, Ben (2006) [1969]. Ships of the Royal Navy: The Complete Record of All Fighting Ships of the Royal Navy from the 15th Century to the Present (3rd Rev ed.). London: Chatham Publishing. ISBN 978-1-86176-281-8. OCLC 67375475.
- Critchley, Mike (1982). British Warships Since 1945. Vol. Part 3: Destroyers. Liskeard, UK: Maritime Books. ISBN 0-9506323-9-2.
- Marolda, Edward (2007). The US Navy in the Korean War. Naval Institute Press. ISBN 978-1-59114-487-8.
- Marriott, Leo (1989). Royal Navy Destroyers Since 1945. Ian Allan Ltd. ISBN 0-7110-1817-0.
- Raven, Alan; Roberts, John (1978). War Built Destroyers O to Z Classes. London: Bivouac Books. ISBN 0-85680-010-4.
- Whitley, M. J. (1988). Destroyers of World War 2. Annapolis, MD: Naval Institute Press. ISBN 0-87021-326-1.
