= George Stephen Ritchie =

British admiral (1914–2012)

Rear-Admiral George Stephen Ritchie CB DSC (30 October 1914 – 8 May 2012) was a British admiral noted for his cartographic and hydrographic work and as an author of many publications on hydrography. He was Hydrographer of the Navy from 1966 to 1971.

== Naval career ==
Ritchie was born in Burnley, 1914, of Scottish parents, Sir Douglas Ritchie and Lady Margaret Stephen Ritchie. He was educated at the Royal Naval College, Dartmouth from the age of 13, from where he went to sea at the age of 17. He decided to specialise in surveying after meeting Sir Frederick Learmonth, a former Hydrographer of the Navy who knew Ritchie's father through their work on the Board of the Port of London Authority. One evening, Learmonth was at dinner with the family, and regaled the young cadet with tales of surveying in distant waters. In 1936 he joined the Surveying Service, being appointed to the old coal-burning surveying ship, HMS Herald, operating in the South China Sea, surveying the coasts of Malaya and Borneo. In 1939 he returned to home waters, serving in HMS Jason, and then worked in Labrador on HMS Franklin.

On the outbreak of the Second World War, Franklin returned to Dover to support the laying of the Channel Mine Barrage. The barrage was designed to confine merchant shipping to narrow safe channels, aiding inspection of neutral shipping for contraband, and to prevent U-boats from traversing the Channel. Franklin laid lines of beacons across the Channel in carefully surveyed positions to guide the converted rail ferries that laid the mines. Ritchie was next in charge of a flotilla of trawlers attempting to locate and "catch" one of the German magnetic mines dropped by parachute into the channel. In 1940, as part of the British occupation of the Faroe Islands Franklin surveyed Scaale Fjord which was to be used as a naval base. Franklin was next employed measuring the speeds of currents through the sounds into Scapa Flow in preparation for the building of the Churchill Barriers to defend the anchorage against U-boat attack.

Ritche left Franklin early in 1942, travelling on S.S. Ceramic from Liverpool, headed for Suez. Ceramic carried both naval and civilian passengers as well as cargo. Here Ritchie met Disa, "a young woman with flowing corn-blonde hair". After detours to Halfax and Rio de Janeiro, Ceramic arrived in Cape Town, where the couple were married, and had a few days together. Ritchie then left for Suez in a Norwegian troopship to join HMS Endeavour. Their first task was to survey the Great Bitter Lake, a part of the Suez Canal that was to provide additional berthing facilities to supplement the main canal ports. He and a colleague were then trained in the use of folding canvas canoes for carrying out clandestne beach surveys in preparation for tank landings. They developed a system for making measurements and detecting tunnels in darkness. In May they were using this method behind enemy lines near the Gulf of Bomba, where they were nearly captured by Italian soldiers, and later made their way to safety in a strong gale during the raid on Tobruk. For this action, Ritchie, by then a Lieutenant, was awarded the Distinguished Service Cross (DSC) for bravery.

Ritchie in Endeavour was then involved in a survey work in the Red Sea and the Gulf of Aqaba. In January 1943, he arrived in Tripoli, Libya to head a mobile survey unit. Working with both a truck and a boat, this unit followed close behind allied forces as they headed west across North Africa, surveying ports as they were taken. Their work in North Africa ended at Bizerta, sounding the channel which was being restored by the US Navy. Orders then came to follow the US invasion into Sicily and join the Eighth Army in Syracuse. This involved comveying their equipment in a US landing craft to Licata, and then requisitioning trains to Syracuse. They then followed the invasion forces onto the Italian mainland, and resumed their mobile survey work on the east coast as the attacking forces moved north.

In February 1944, Ritchie was back in home waters as first lieutenant of HMS Scott. His wife Disa was able to rejoin him from South Africa. Scott then took part in Operation Neptune, the Normandy landings, supporting the creation of Mulberry harbour B at Arromanches, one of two temporary harbours which were essential in bringing supplies across the channel for the invading forces. The surveyors laid accurately positioned buoys to guide the sinking of blockships to form a breakwater, and then surveyed the resulting harbour. To aid in this, Scott was equipped with an early radiolocation system. They next surveyed the Morlaix estuary to establish safe approach channels for supply boats for the ongoing siege. After that they were again working to survey and re-open ports as they were taken from the enemy. This work was completed by February 1945. Hostilities in Europe ended in May 1945, but major work remained for the surveyors, clearing mines, locating, surveying and marking wrecks, and re-surveying the shifting banks off the English coasts that had been negelected during the war. Scott, after a refit, played a major part in this work. The Decca System, developed from the prototype used in Normandy, was being introduced, and Ritchie spent time in the East Anglian countryside locating Ordnance Survey marks so that the relays could be accurately positioned. This aided the survey work as well as navigation in the North sea.

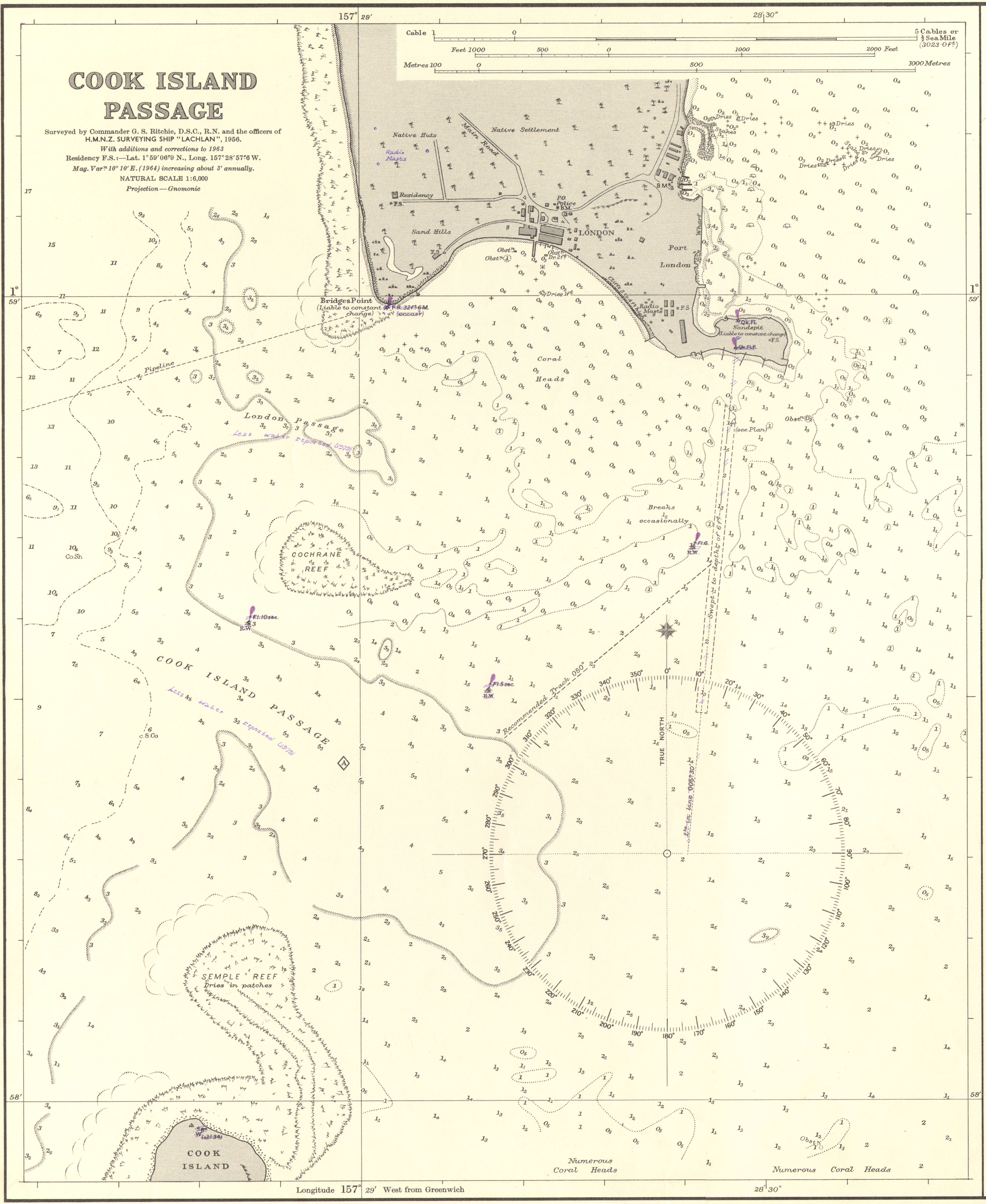
Part of Christmas Island (Kiritimati), surveyed by Ritchie in Lachlan in 1956.

In early 1946, Ritchie oversaw the conversion of the minesweeper HMS Sharpshooter to a survey ship, and then sailed as her first lieutenant to the far east, surveying for 18 months in Malaysia and Brunei. Ritchie then continued to work in the surveying branch of the Royal Navy travelling all over the World and commanding four of HM surveying Ships: HMS Challenger (1950-1951) on a world circling voyage with scientists on board; HMNZS Lachlan (1953-1956), the New Zealand survey ship; HMS Dalrymple (1959), in the Persian Gulf and HMS Vidal (1963-1965) in the West Indies and North Atlantic. In 1951 on the survey ship HMS Challenger, recorded the deepest part of the ocean trench depth Challenger Deep of 5,960 fathoms (10,900 m, 35,761 ft) using both wire and echo sounding. In 1956, Ritchie in Lachlan was surveying in the Line Islands in preparation for the British nuclear tests, which took place the following year, using Christmas Island (Kiritimati) as a base.

Between his sea assignments, Ritchie had a series of headquarters appointments. From 1951 - 1954, he was Superintendent of the Oceanographic Branch. In 1957, on his return from New Zealand, where he had been promoted Captain, he became Assistant Hydrographer (2), and in 1960 Assistant Hydrographer (1). In 1966 he was promoted to the rank of rear admiral and appointed to the post of Hydrographer of the Navy which he held for five years, responsible for the operations of the RN Surveying Squadron and the publication of the Admiralty Chart worldwide series. In the same year he received a Companion of the Bath.

An early metric four-colour chart, Gibraltar Bay, Published in 1968

During his period as hydrographer, operations were fully transferred to Taunton, improved printing facilities were installed, allowing four-colour printing of charts, and metrication was started. In 1967, Ritchie led the United Kingdom delegation to the Ninth International Hydrographic Conference. In the same year he published The Admiralty Chart, a history of British Naval Hydrography in the Nineteenth Century. In 1970 he presented a more technical historical paper on the development of surveying methods over the previous two centuries.

== Post naval career ==
After his retirement from the Navy in 1971, Ritchie spent 18 months as a senior research fellow at Southampton University. he was then elected first in 1972 and again in 1977 as president of the International Hydrographic Bureau, thus spending 10 years in the Principality of Monaco, in the service of the then 50 Member States of the International Hydrographic Organization.

Admiral Ritchie received the Founder's Medal of the Royal Geographical Society in 1972, the Gold Medal of the Royal Institute of Navigation (he was president from 1970 to 1972), the Silver Medal of the Royal Society of Arts and the Prix Manley-Bendall from the Academie de Marine. He was an honorary member of the Challenger Society for Marine Science and an emeritus Member of the Hydrographic Society, of which he had been the first president.

After his return from Monaco he lived with his wife, Disa, in the family house built by his grandfather in the fishing village of Collieston, Aberdeenshire. The couple had three sons, John, Paul and Mark, and one daughter, Tertia. He was a prolific author of books and other publications. His books include Challenger - The Life of a Survey Ship (1957), The Admiralty Chart (1967), his autobiography, No Day too Long: An Hydrographer's Tale (1992) and As it Was (2003). He wrote a regular column describing how hydrography used to be, for the international publication Hydro International from 1985–1995. A comprehensive list of his publications is given in the obituary that appeared in Imago Mundi.

In 2009 he donated his collection on the history of hydrography to the Robinson Library at Newcastle University.

He died on 8 May 2012 in Collieston, Aberdeenshire.

== See also ==
- Admiralty chart
- United Kingdom Hydrographic Office
