= History of the Jews in Hadramaut =

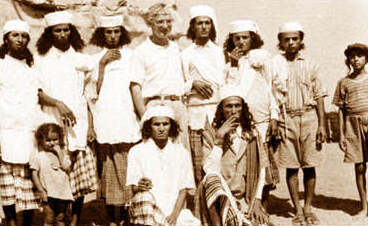
Hadhrami Jewish Men from Habban

The history of the Jews in Hadramaut stretches back to ancient times. The Hadhrami Jews were a subset of the Yemeni Jews.

== History ==
The Hadramaut Region in Yemen today. The traditional region was larger.

The Hadramaut Region in Yemen today. The traditional region was larger.

The community was very old, and, after the rise of Islam and the expulsion of the Hejazi Jews, the main centers of Jewish population in Arabia were in Hadhramaut and in Aden. However, the Jews of Hadhramaut were much more isolated than their counterparts in Aden, and the community only became known to the outside world in the 1940s. The community had distinctive religious traditions. Many of the Hadhrami Jews converted to Islam, but after the founding of the State of Israel, some of the community made Aliyah, but those who remained assimilated and converted to Islam. Today, there are no longer any Hadhramaut Jews known to exist in Yemen.

== Geography and families ==
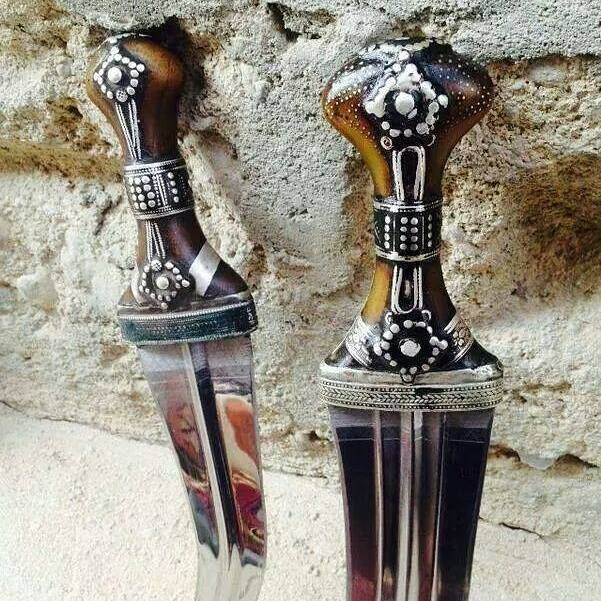
Hadrami Dagger

The Jews of Hadhramaut lived in Seiyun, Tarim, Mukalla and al-Shihr. Among the well-known Jewish families of the region in al-Shihr and Mukalla are Ben Haneen, Ben Haiem, Ben Yaze'a, Ben Yisra'ail and Ben Qatian, Ben Fayed (Bafayed), Ben Zeghieo. Most of these families converted to Islam between 1509 and the 1960s, and a few migrated to Israel after 1948.

After the union between South Yemen and the Yemen Arab Republic in the North, and because of the strict tribal system, most of these families melted into the tribes of Arabia by renaming their laqab ("family name") after a well-known Muslim tribe to avoid discrimination based on their former Jewish roots. The Ben Qattian family in Hadhramaut are dagger-makers and gold-smiths. Their handmade daggers are well known.

== See also ==
- Adeni Jews
- Habbani Jews
- Hadharem
- Yemenite Jews
