= SS Kowloon No.1 =

Former cargo ship

History
- Name: Empire Dirk (1943-51); Nancy Moller (1951); Mount Austin (1951-52); Coolabah (1952-56); Troon Breeze (1956-64); Cachupin (1964-66); Kowloon No.1 (1966-67)
- Owner: Ministry of War Transport (1943-45); Ministry of Transport (1945-50); Moller Line (U.K.) Ltd (1950-52); Australian Shipping Board (1952-56); Cambay Prince Steamship Co Ltd (1956-64); San Fernando Steamship Co Ltd (1964-66); Shui Cheung Shipping & Trading Ltd (1966-67)
- Operator: C Strubin & Co Ltd (1943-461); Moller Line (U.K.) Ltd (1946-52); Australian Shipping Board (1952-56); J Manners & Co Ltd (1956-66); Shui Cheung Shipping & Trading Ltd (1966-67)
- Port of registry: Troon, United Kingdom (1943-51); (United Kingdom) London (1951-54); Melbourne, Australia (1954-56); (United Kingdom) Hong Kong (1956-64); Panama City, Panama (1964-66); Hong Kong (1966-67)
- Builder: Ailsa Shipbuilding Co Ltd
- Yard number: 447
- Launched: 31 August 1943
- Completed: November 1943
- Maiden voyage: 28 November 1943
- Identification: United Kingdom Official Number 167650; Code Letters BFKW
- Fate: Ran aground in September 1967, scrapped in June 1968

General characteristics
- Type: Cargo ship
- Tonnage: 2,943 GRT (1943-52); 3,327 GRT (1952-68); 1,668 NRT (1943-52); 1,824 NRT (1952-68)
- Length: 327 ft 10 in (99.92 m) overall; 315 ft 4 in (96.11 m) (between perpendiculars)
- Beam: 46 ft 6 in (14.17 m)
- Draught: 20 feet 9 1/2 inches (6.337 m)
- Depth: 20 ft 10 in (6.35 m)
- Installed power: 268 nhp
- Propulsion: Triple expansion steam engine
- Crew: 40 (Troon Breeze)

Location where Kowloon No.1 ran aground off the coast of Japan.

Kowloon No.1 was a 2,942 GRT cargo ship that was built in 1943 as Empire Dirk by Ailsa Shipbuilding Co Ltd, Troon, Ayrshire, United Kingdom for the Ministry of War Transport (MoWT). Spending the war years in home waters, she was sold into merchant service in 1951 and renamed Nancy Moller, and then Mount Austin after a further sale later that year. In 1956, she was sold to the Australian Government and renamed Coolabah.

She was sold to Hong Kong in 1956 and renamed Troon Breeze. A sale in 1964 to Panama saw her renamed Cachupin before she was sold back to Hong Kong in 1966 and renamed Kowloon No.1. She served until 1967 when she ran aground off Hachinohe, Japan. Although refloated, she was declared a constructive total loss and was scrapped in 1968.

== Description ==
The ship was built in 1943 by Ailsa Shipbuilding Co Ltd, Troon. She was yard number 447.

The ship was 327 feet 10 inches (99.92 m) long, with a beam of 46 feet 6 inches (14.17 m). She had a depth of 20 feet 10 inches (6.35 m), and a draught of 20 feet 9 1/2 inches (6.337 m). As built, she was assessed at 2,942 GRT, 1,668 NRT.

The ship was propelled by a 268 nhp triple expansion steam engine, which had cylinders of 20 inches (51 cm), 31 inches (79 cm) and 55 inches (140 cm) diameter by 39 inches (99 cm) stroke. The engine was built by Ailsa Shipbuilding Company, Troon.

== History ==
=== Second World War ===
Empire Dirk was built for the MoWT. She was launched on 31 August 1943, and completed in November. Her port of registry was Troon. The Official Number 167650 and Code Letters BFKW were allocated. She was placed under the management of C Strubin & Son.

Empire Dirk made her maiden voyage on 28 November 1943, when she departed from the Clyde for Preston, Lancashire, arriving five days later. She departed from Preston on 10 December for the Clyde, arriving on 12 December and departing six days later for Swansea, Glamorgan, where she arrived on 22 December. She sailed from Swansea on 5 January 1944 for Cardiff, arriving that day and then sailing to join Convoy WP 459, which departed from Milford Haven, Pembrokeshire on 9 January and arrived at Portsmouth, Hampshire on 11 January. She was the only merchant ship in the convoy, which was escorted by four Hunt-class destroyers: HMS Brissenden, HMS Glaisdale, HMS Stevenstone and HMS Tanatside. She left the convoy at Plymouth, Devon on 11 January, departing the next day to join Convoy WP 460, which departed from Milford Haven on 11 January and arrived at Portsmouth two days later. Empire Dirk left the convoy at Dartmouth, Devon on 12 January, departing two days later to join Convoy WP 461, which had departed from Milford Haven on 13 January and arrived at Portsmouth on 15 January. She left the convoy at St Helens Roads, off the Isle of Wight to join Convoy CE 237, which arrived at Southend, Essex on 16 January.

Empire Dirk spend the next six months sailing the east coast of the United Kingdom, mostly in convoys between Methil Fife and Southend, with calls at Blyth, Northumberland, Hull, Yorkshire, and the Tyne. She departed from Southend on 21 July as a member of Convoy ETC 44, which was bound for the Seine Bay, in Upper Normandy, France. She then sailed to Barry, Glamorgan, via convoys FBC 34 and FBC 35, arriving on 26 July. She departed from Barry on 22 August as a member of Convoy EBC 86, which arrived at the Seine Bay two days later. Empire Dirk's movements are not recorded for the next three months, but she departed from the Solent on 25 November as a member of Convoy EBF 47, which arrived at Milford Haven two days later. She sailed on to Cardiff, arriving on 28 November.

Empire Dirk was a member of Convoy BTC 38, which departed from Milford Haven on 14 January 1945 and arrived at Southend three days later. She spent the next two months sailing between Southend and Methil, with a call at Sunderland, Co Durham in February. She arrived at the Tyne on 25 March, not sailing until 4 May when she joined Convoy FS 1795, which had departed from Methil that day and arrived at Southend on 4 May. She then joined Convoy TAM 158, which departed that day and arrived at Antwerp, Belgium the same day. She left the convoy at Terneuzen, Netherlands.

=== Post-war ===
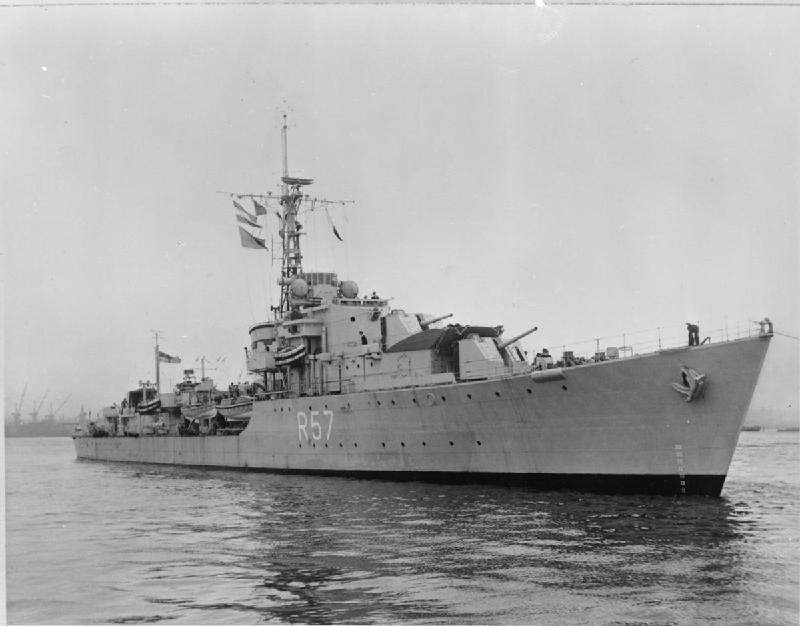
HMS Cossack, which intercepted Nancy Moller off Hainan, China in May 1951

Empire Dirk made a return trip from Antwerp to Southend via convoys ATM 154 and TAM 174 before sailing to the Tyne via Southend, arriving on 30 May. She spent the next two months sailing between the Tyne, Bergen, Norway and Methil. In 1947, management of Empire Dirk was transferred to Moller Line (U.K.) Ltd. In that year, she was converted from coal to oil fuel. She was sold to her managers in 1950 and renamed Nancy Moller in 1951.

On 12 May 1951, Nancy Moller departed from Singapore, bound for Whampoa China. She was carrying a cargo of 3,500 long tons (3,556 t) of rubber destined for China in contravention of an export ban. On 18 May, she was intercepted by HMS Cossack off Hainan Island, China and escorted back to Singapore. The interception was carried out under regulation 53 of the Emergency Powers (Defence) Act 1939, which gave the British government powers to requisition any ship on the British or Colonial register and order the ship to proceed as directed. An agreement had been made between the British government and the governments of the Federation of Malaya and Singapore to limit exports of rubber to China to 2,500 long tons (2,540 t) per month from 9 April 1951. The embargo was part of a United Nations embargo against China, which was supplying arms to Kim Il-Sung's forces in the Korean War. Nancy Moller reached Singapore on 23 May. Her cargo was stated to be worth S$2,000,000 (then £1,000,000). Her cargo had been covered by an export licence that had been issued before the embargo came into force.

Later that year, she was transferred to Mount Line Ltd, Hong Kong and renamed Mount Austin, remaining under Moller's management. She was sold to the Australian Shipping Board in 1952 and renamed Coolabah, although she was not reflagged until October 1954. She was assessed at 3,327 GRT, 1,824 NRT. In November 1956, she was sold to the Cambray Breeze Shipping Co Ltd, Hong Kong and renamed Troon Breeze, but returning to the British flag. On 18 April 1957, Troon Breeze rescued the 25 crew of the Italian steamship Nica, which had caught fire in the Andaman Sea off the coast of Burma. In March 1958, the owners of Troon Breeze were fined Rp200,000 (then £6,451) for a violation of maritime flag law. She had been detained for about a month at Makassar. On 19 January 1964, Troon Breeze was seized at Samarinda, East Borneo, where she had arrived to load a cargo of lumber. The ship and her 40 crew were detained. The detention of Troon Breeze was stated by the Straits Times to be in retaliation for the detention of two Indonesian ships at Hong Kong due to court action against Penai, the Indonesian state shipping company.

Troon Breeze was sold in 1964 to the San Fernando Shipping Co SA, Panama and was renamed Cachupin. In 1966, she was sold to the Shiu Cheung Shipping & Trading Co Ltd, Hong Kong and renamed Kowloon No.1. She served until 16 September 1967 when she ran aground at Hachinohe, Japan (40°32′N 141°33′E). She was refloated on 7 October 1967 and towed to Yokosuka, arriving on 11 October. Kowloon No.1 was declared a constructive total loss. She was sold for scrap in February 1968, and was scrapped at Oppama in June 1968.
