= History of the Jews in Eritrea =

The location of Eritrea in Africa

The history of the Jews in Eritrea can be traced back to the late 19th century arrival of Yemenite Jews.

== History ==
Eritrea once had a small community of Yemenite Jews who arrived in the country after having been attracted by new commercial opportunities driven by Italian colonial expansion in the late 19th century. In 1906, the Asmara Synagogue was completed in Asmara, the capital. It includes a main sanctuary which can seat up to 200 people, classrooms, and a small Jewish cemetery.

In the 1930s, the Jewish community was bolstered when many European Jews emigrated to Eritrea to escape Nazi persecution in Europe. In 1936, the governor of the province allocated funds for the construction of a synagogue in Asmara.

During British administration, Eritrea was often used as a location of internment for Irgun and Lehi guerrillas fighting for Jewish independence in the British Mandate of Palestine (now Israel). Among those imprisoned were future Israeli Prime Minister Yitzhak Shamir and Haim Corfu, a founder of Beitar Jerusalem.

In 1948, after Israel was founded as a Jewish state, many Yemeni Jews residing in Eritrea emigrated to Israel. In the 1950s, 500 Jews still lived in the country. The last Jewish wedding at Asmara Synagogue was celebrated during that decade. The synagogue also served Jews who came from all over Africa to observe the High Holy Days there.

In 1961 the Eritrean War for Independence began after Eritrea was annexed by Ethiopia, and Eritreans began to fight for independence. It was then that Jews began to leave Eritrea. In the early 1970s, Jewish emigration increased because of ensuing violence between Eritrean separatists and Ethiopia. In 1975, the Chief Rabbi and much of the community were evacuated. Many Jews settled in Israel, while others went to Europe or North America. By then, only 150 Jews remained in the country.

Eritrea formally gained its independence in 1993. At the time, there were only a handful of Jews still left in the country. (In 2001 the Cohan family numbered four) All but one have either died or emigrated. There was only one last native Jew left in Eritrea, Samuel Cohen, who ran an import-export business and attends to the Asmara Synagogue. Cohen was still alive and living in Asmara as of December 2024.

Judaism is not one of the four religions recognized by the Eritrean government.

== See also ==
- History of the Jews in Africa

=== Regions: ===
- History of the Jews in Central Africa
- History of the Jews in East Africa
- History of the Jews in North Africa
- History of the Jews in Southern Africa
- History of the Jews in West Africa

=== Topics: ===
- Religion in Eritrea
- Yemenite Jews
