= Habbani Jews =

Jewish community from the Habban region of eastern Yemen

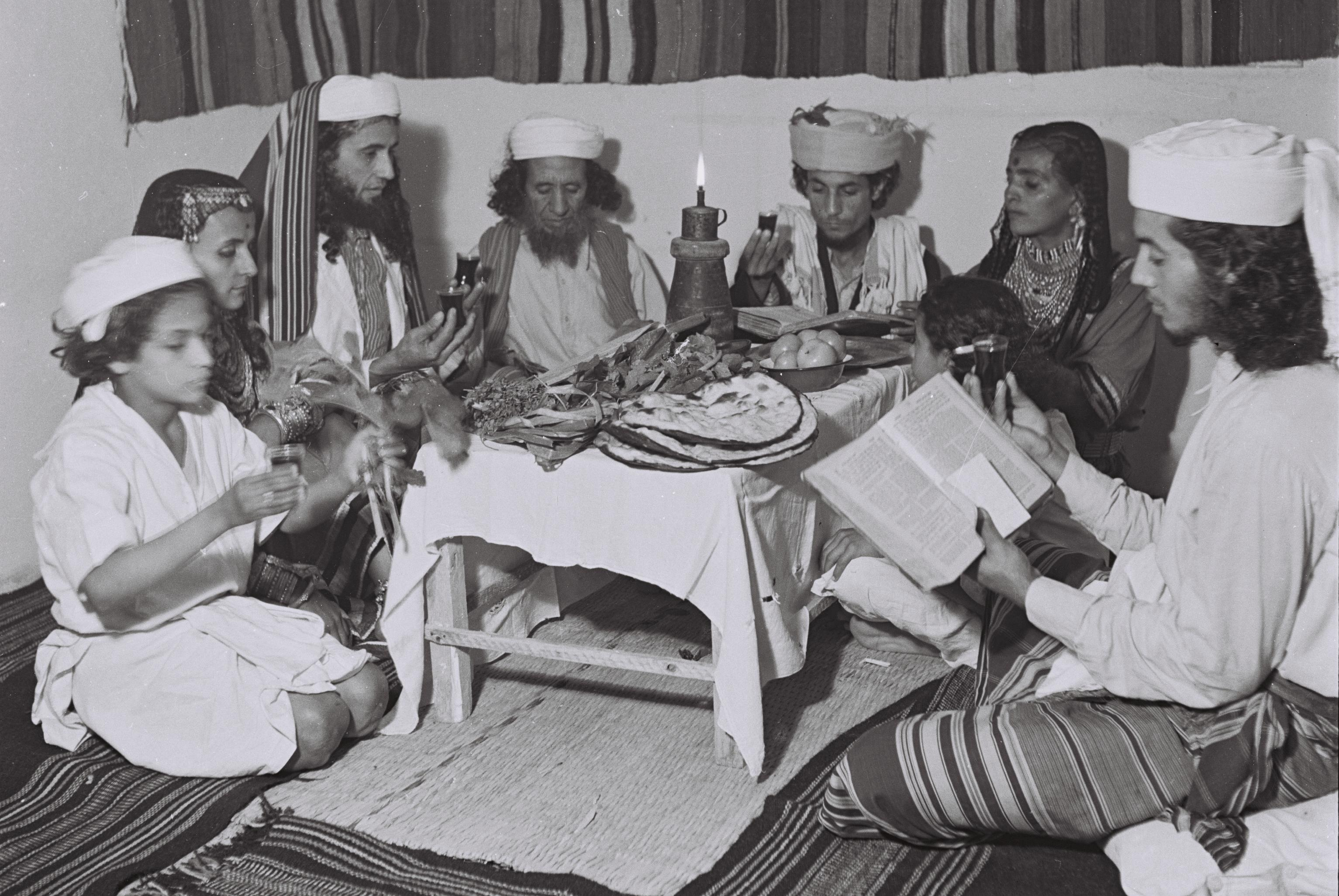
Yemenite Habbani family celebrating Passover in Tel Aviv

The Habbani Jews (Hebrew: חַבָּאנִים, Standard: Ḥabbanim) are a culturally distinct Jewish population group from the Habban region in eastern Yemen (in modern Shabwah Governorate), a subset of the larger ethnic group of Yemenite Jews. The city of Habban had a Jewish community of 450 in 1947, which was considered to possibly be the remains of a larger community which lived independently in the region before its decline in the 6th century. The Jewish community of Habban disappeared from the map of the Hadramaut, in southeast Yemen, with the emigration of all of its members to Israel in the 1950s.

== Ancient and medieval history ==
Shabwa in Yemen where the bulk of Habbani Jews were found.

Several traditions place Israelites in Arabia as early as the era of Solomon's Temple. One such tradition has three divisions of Israelite soldiers being sent by either King David or King Solomon while another places the earliest migration just before the destruction of the First Temple during the 597 BCE Siege of Jerusalem. Another tradition, shared with northern Yemenite Jews, states that under the prophet Jeremiah some 75,000 Israelites, including priests and Levites, traveled to Yemen. The Jews of southern Yemen have a tradition that they are the descendants of Judeans who settled in the area before the destruction of the Second Temple during the Siege of Jerusalem in 70 CE. According to tradition, those Judeans belonged to a brigade dispatched by Herod the Great to assist the Roman legions fighting in the region (see Aelius Gallus).

Khaybar and Yathrib were two Jewish communities in Arabia that initially maintained a measure of independence. The Jews shared Yathrib with two Arab clans that who were sometimes friendly and other times quite hostile. According to tradition, the Jews of Khaybar were descended from the Rechabites who, under clan founder Yonadab ben Rechav, led a nomadic existence. Following the destruction of First Temple, they wandered as far as the region of Khaybar, drawn to it by its oasis of palm trees and grain fields. The oasis was strategically located on the Arabian route up to Israel and Syria, 140 kilometres (90 mi) north of Medina. The Rechabite warriors of Khaybar built a line of forts and castles with the strongest of them being Kamus, built atop an inaccessible cliff.

Between 1065 and 1117 Rabbi Benjamin of Tudela traveled through Arabia arriving as far south as Aden. According to Tudela's travel log he found an independent Jewish warrior tribe living in several mountainous areas near the district of Tihamah in Yemen. He noted that this group of Jews were at times in armed combat with various north African tribes and also had contact with Jewish communities in Persia and Egypt.

Local Yemenite accounts place the establishment of a substantial Jewish presence in Southern Yemen after the Himyar tribe accepted Judaism, approximately 100 C.E. According to Habbani Jewish sources Jewish migrants, traveling south from Saudi Arabia, first settled in an area known as "Ilmarkh" (אלמרך) near a mountain known as Ishav (אשב) which is 10 km east from the city of Habban. The area, once known as Mount "Da'ah" (הר דעה), was said to have once been the seat of a Jewish rulership that may have also been connected to the Himyar tribe.

=== Silverwork ===
Habbani was home to "renowned" Yemenite Jewish silversmiths, whose distinctive work was valued across the Hadramaut.

== Habbani communal structure ==
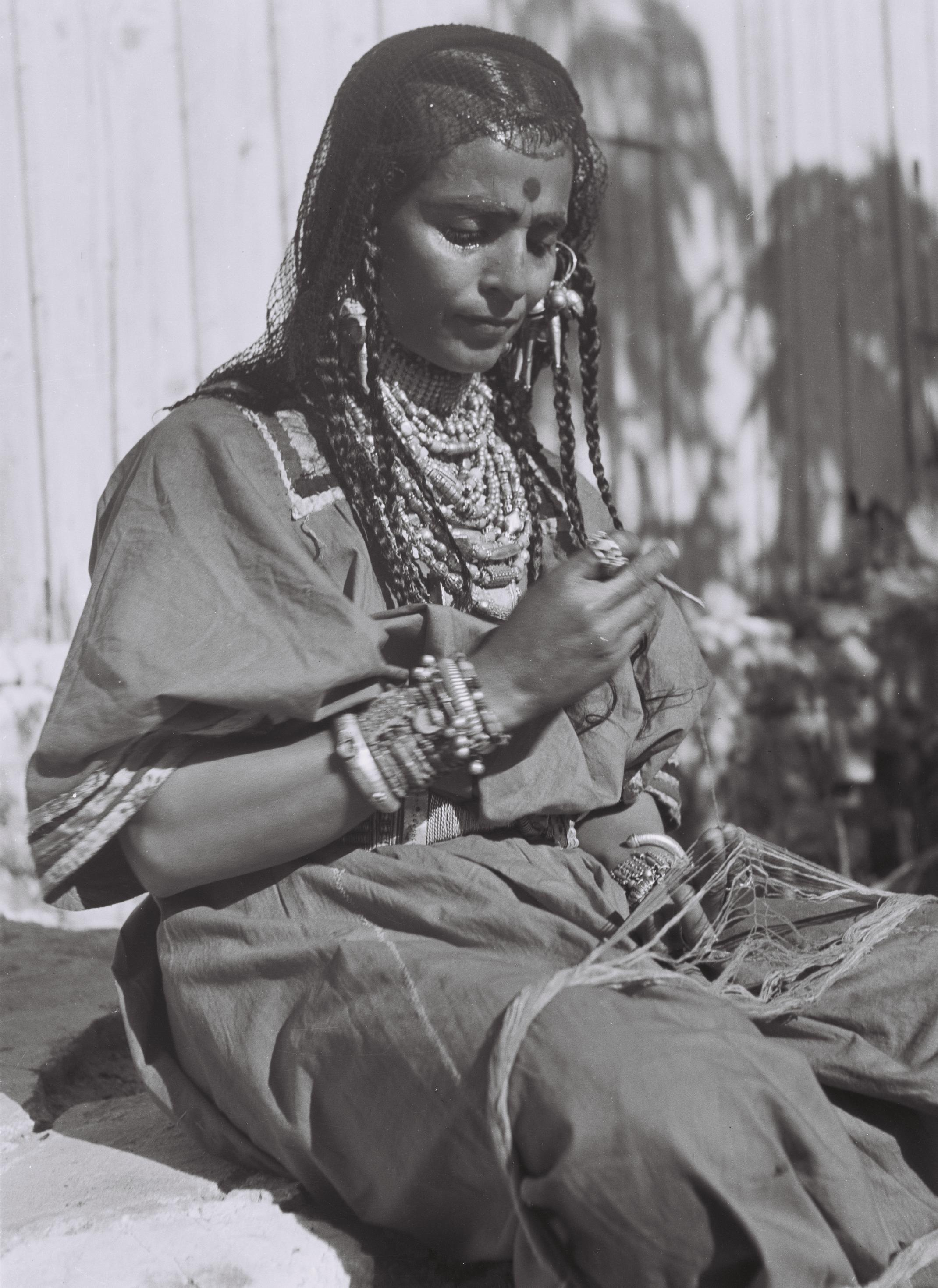
Habbani woman doing handicraft

The major clans of the Habbani were the al Adani, Doh, Hillel, Maifa'i, Ma'tuf, Shamakh, Bah'quer and D'gurkash. All but the last two exist in Israel today. They did not have Kohen or Levites among them. Their traditional occupations included silversmiths, blacksmiths, goldsmiths, and making household utensils, and the men particularly engaged in long-distance trading.

In the 16th century, thanks to the advice of a Habbani Jew, Suleman the Wise, the Jews received a special quarter of Habban. And in the late 17th century, a severe drought hit Habban, resulting in considerable demographic changes. Habbani families came under intense pressure to reproduce to help repopulate the community, despite an acute shortage of women. But the most significant impact of the drought was a large-scale exodus of Habbani Jews across Yemen and far beyond.

The drought of the 1700s decimated the Habbani. The Bah'quer and D'gurkash clans specifically left the valley to seek sustenance for their families. They traveled all the way to India, but when they returned they found that most of their families had died from starvation. They left Yemen again to travel on the Indian Ocean, settling in India and East Africa along typical Hadhrami settlement routes, finding work as mercenaries for the Nizam, the Mughal emperors and the Al Said. Most of these tribes assimilated into local populations, adopting the surnames of their patrons. Other Habbani Jews during the drought of the 1700s migrated to the west, to Bayda, Bayhan and Aden. The remaining Habbani clans in Yemen, viz., al-Adani, Doh, Hillel, Maifa'i, Ma'tuf and Shamakh, were reduced to 1-4 adult males each and their families. The entire Habbani Jewish population was estimated to be no more than 50 people at the end of the 18th century. In the 19th century, the population gradually recovered, despite recurrent migrations to the north (al-Ghabiyah in "il-Hadineh") and west (Abyan, Dathinah and Bayda), from less than one-hundred in 1800 to nearly four-hundred and fifty in the mid-1940s.

=== Synagogues ===
In Habban, there were two synagogues that were divided between the two major Jewish families, Maatuf and Hillel. The older of the two was the building that the Hillel family continued to pray in after the Maatuf family formed a new synagogue. The Hillel family synagogue was also frequented by members of the Shamakh, Mif'ay, and Adani families. The synagogue not only served the purpose of community prayer during Shabbat and the Haggim but also as a Beit Sefer and a Beit Din.

== Religious traditions ==
The Jews of Habban, though isolated from the majority of Yemenite Jewish communities, were able to maintain various levels of contact with larger Jewish populations in the north and shared in many of their common traits. They possessed religious texts such as the Talmud, Mishneh Torah, Shulkhan Arukh, and Duties of the Heart. Yet, the Jews of Habban also developed their own traditions and customs which made them distinct.

=== Prayer book - Tiklal "Ateret Zqenim" ===
Upon emigration to Israel, the Jews of Habban did not possess many written texts due to a number of factors such as constant travel of men from their communities as well as the theft of their existing texts. In order to bridge the gap Rabbi Shalom Yitzhaq Maatuf Doh compiled a prayer book based on the traditions from Habban, in addition to the traditions of both Baladi and Shami Yemenite communities as well. He did not live to see the first printing of his siddur, but the work was completed by his sons and his son-in-law Avner Maatuf.

=== Torah reading and Targum ===
Yemenite Jews and the Aramaic speaking Kurdish Jews are the only communities who maintain the tradition of reading the Torah in the synagogue in both Hebrew and the Aramaic Targum ("translation"). Some non-Yemenite synagogues have a specified person called a Baal Koreh, who reads from the Torah scroll when congregants are called to the Torah scroll for an aliyah, yet in Yemenite communities each person called to the Torah scroll for an aliyah reads for himself. In contrast, in Habban, children under the age of Bar Mitzvah were often given either the fifth or the sixth aliyah. Each verse of the Torah read in Hebrew is followed by the Aramaic, and sometimes an additional Arabic translation, usually chanted by a child.

These population shortages could result in marriages outside of traditional family lines. Around the mid-1800s, one Habbani man from the al-Adani clan whose wife had died married a woman from al-Bedhani. The woman allegedly seduced and married a non-Jewish neighbor, and the ensuing backlash resulted in the family moving to Dathina, never to return. Although intermittent persecution did occur, the biggest threat to Habbani Jews during this time was conversion due to assimilation. During the great famine of 1724, 700 Jews voluntarily converted to Islam to receive greater food rations. Despite the lack of forced conversions, Habbani Jews also converted to Islam to improve their social status, to pursue romantic affairs, and when seeking refuge due to internal feuds.

An example of these types of feuds was an inheritance dispute in the 1930s between the daughters of a man with no sons resulted in one line of the lineage migrating to Aden and avoided conversion, and them migrated to the Palestine Mandate.

=== Passover - Pesach ===
Several weeks before Pesach, Jews in Habban would begin with preparations such as whitewashing the walls of their homes using a stone known in Arabic as a (קטאט) "Qtat" which had been melted in water and would give the color white. Special utensils, such as pots (אלטסות) "Iltsut", kettles (אלדלל) "Ildelal", and serving plates (אלתחון), which were specifically used only on Pesach were brought out and set aside.

The special flour for matzah was ground and prepared by women in their community while the baking was performed by the men. The matzah was made the day before Pesach, after mid-day, with various recitations of the Hallel being sung in groups. The first group would sing the lines of the Hallel while the second group would answer with the statement (הללויה) "Halleluyah" or (כי לעולם חסדו) "Because his mercy is forever". Some even had the tradition to answer the Hallel with the Arabic translation (קד לדהר פצלו) "Qid liddhar fassluw".

=== Pentecost - Shavuot ===
Similar to other holy days, the Jews of Habban would prepare the day before Shavuot by giving to the poor and preparing the food that would be eaten. Members of the community would wash themselves and don their best clothes before going to the synagogue to pray Minchah and Arvit. On the day of Shavuot after praying Shachrit and Musaf the Jews of Habban had a special tradition to recite "Azharot" liturgical poems, or versifications, of the 613 commandments in the rabbinical enumeration as found in the Siddur of Saadia Gaon.

A special breakfast meal was prepared on Shavuot with a type of pastry known as (מעצובה) "Mi'tzubah" served with honey and fried butter which symbolized the Torah being like honey and milk. This was based on the section of Psalms 19:11 which states: "and sweeter than honey and the honeycomb."

After breakfast they had a tradition of pouring water on each other as symbol of the people of Israel receiving the Torah at Mount Sinai with the water being symbolic of the Torah, based on Isaiah 55:1 which states, "all who are thirsty come for water." The first to start this tradition was Mori Yitzhaq ben Salem who would pour drops of water into his hands from a can say, "I threw pure water on you and it purifies you from all of your impurities," from Ezikiel 36:25.

== Modern times ==
In 1912 Zionist emissary Shmuel Yavne'eli came into contact with Habbani Jews who ransomed him when he was captured and robbed by eight Bedouin in southern Yemen. Yavnieli wrote about the Jews of Habban describing them in the following way.

The Jews in these parts are held in high esteem by everyone in Yemen and Aden. They are said to be courageous, always with their weapons and wild long hair, and the names of their towns are mentioned by the Jews of Yemen with great admiration.

Yavne'eli further described the community structure by stating that the Zecharyah clan were the first of the Habbani Jewish clans and that they were local merchants of silver, leather pelts, and cobbling. He further noted that meat was only eaten on the Shabbat and even coffee was considered a luxury.

According to Rabbi Yoseph Maghori-Kohen:

The Habbanis were mighty heroes. I heard a lot from elders in my youth about the Habbanis, about their wars, how they would fight ‘according to names’. What does it mean ‘according to names’? –the letters: They would make the shape of the [Hebrew] letters with their hands, and by this they would be victorious. Also the Shar`abim–from the city of Shar`ab–were strong, but not to the same degree as the Habbanis. Once in Yemen there was a wild tribe of murderous Arab warriors that conquered town after town, slaughtering whomever they found. Thus they moved forward from settlement to settlement: killing, destroying–may their names by blotted out–until they approached a city of Jews, 13,000 Jews roughly. Everyone felt hopeless-even the Arabs among them put up their hands, searching for a place to escape. Suddenly ten [Jewish] Habbanis arrived and waged war with them–ten against a thousand–and vanquished all of them. Not even one of those warriors was left alive, and not one of the ten fell.

Yavne'eli indicated that in 1911 there were only 60 Jewish families left in Habban. Bin Ibrahim Habbani, who was born in Habban and emigrated to Israel in 1945, indicated there were 700 Jews in Hadhramaut, 450 of which were in Habban.

== Emigration to Israel ==
Habbani Jews were extremely reluctant to migrate to Israel, citing their good relations with their neighbors. In 1945, a Habbani Jew claimed to be the Messiah, gathering both a Jewish and Muslim following from Hadhramaut and made his way to Beihar. He became known for his pomp and extravagance, decorating his horse's saddle with gold and silver. Following a large battle where the alleged Messiah and his followers were vanquished, tensions between some of the Muslim rulers and the Jewish communities were accentuated. Some Habbani Jews blamed activities and letters by the Jewish Agency for aggravating tensions further.

The vanguard of the Habbani Jews was led by Zecharyah Habbani who kept after the officials in charge of immigration to accelerate the transfer of the Jews from the Hadramaut to the Land of Israel. They are in dire distress," he reported. "They are suffering from hunger and from the edicts of Hussein Abdallah of Habban and his sons. They are also in debt to the Moslems, who charge them exorbitant rates of interest." The Jewish Agency took action, and few families left the Hadramaut. After 1948, small numbers of Habbani Jews made their way to Aden, sometimes fighting hostile Arab tribes along the way. From there they were airlifted en masse to Israel as part of Operation Flying Carpet.

Describing the route followed by most Habbanis who participated in the Israeli airlift, Operation Magic Carpet:

The way [to the airfield] was generally in the direction of Ihwar. In Ihwar they would stay for some time, collecting food, money, and afterwards continue from there to Sheikh `Uthman and `Aden, to the camp Hashid—and from there they would wait their turn for the airplane to the Land [of Israel]. The problem was getting to camp Hashid, for they [the locals] would not always allow entry, and not to everyone. Therefore the first emigrants remained a relatively long time in Sheikh `Uthman. And when the pogrom in `Aden happened, they were in danger.

Eyewitnesses Gamar bath Hassan `Adeni, Sa`id bin Yusuf and Sa`id bin Musa Mif`i, who were present and participated at the time of the uprising, and presently live in Salame [Kfar Shalem] – Tel Aviv, recount the might of those Habbani Jewish individuals who fought with bravery and strength, and that they killed a great number of Arabs. And with what weapons did they fight? Like axes, pickaxes, knives, and iron bars and wooden bats, and the like.”

In Israel the Habbanim settled in two moshavim: Kefar Shalem, near Tel Aviv and Bereqet, 3 kilometres (2 mi) from Ben Gurion Airport.

The vast majority of Habbani Jews left Yemen in the Spring of 1950, after Operation Magic Carpet and the riots in Aden had concluded. The largest impetus for them was that the earlier migrants over the past few years had left Habban with considerable outstanding debts, and the remaining community was concerned about being held responsible. In January 1950 they traveled from Habban and arrived in Mahane Geula in Aden. By September 1950, most Habbani Jews were living at the Ein Shemer Immigration Camp in Israel until permanent housing could be arranged for them.

Habbani Jews in Israel and America today experience an acute threat of cultural assimilation. By the 1960s, none but the elders wore traditional clothing, and many in Israel complained about discrimination at the hands of Ashkenazim. They were often referred to by other Israelis as "primitive" and "wild Indians.". This resulted in some Habbanim fighting back against what was perceived as "cultural imperialism." Through the practice of extensive endogamy, many Habbani Jews were able to retain their identity. Up to 88% of Habbani Jews chose to marry within their community.

== Differences between Habbani Jews and Northern Yemenite Jews ==
The Jews of Habban, for most of their history, were separated from the main centers of Yemenite Jewry, and isolated geographically. Despite their isolation they succeeded in developing their own resources, religious as well as economic, and created an environment of their own.

Religious fervor was common among Habbani Jews. Even the most uneducated among them were capable of conducting the role of cantor, and many were advanced legalists. The most famous legal scholar among them was Musa bin Rom Shamakh in the 17th century, who was the last individual able to make binding legal decisions. Despite this religious zeal, voluntary conversions of Habbani Jews to Islam were not uncommon, which often put the community in conflict with each other.

There were a number of characteristics that made the Jews of Habban in modern times distinct from the Jews of Northern Yemen.

- Their outer appearance and clothing.
- Their food and its preparation.
- Their distinct profession (they were silversmiths).
- There were no Kohanim or Levites among them.
- Their unique traditions on holidays and happy occasions.
- Their version of the prayers and piyutim

Though isolated, the Jews of Habban did maintain some level of contact with other Yemenite Jewish communities though said contact was infrequent and usually resulted from some quarrel over some point of Jewish law.

Habbani Jews were described as taller and more muscular than their Muslim neighbors. The men did not sport peyot like other Yemeni Jews, and, rather than covering their heads, wore an oiled thong through their characteristically long hair. They plucked their mustaches, distinct from other Jews, but similar to neighboring Muslims. They wore a blue prayer shawl over one shoulder, or walked bare chested, smearing their torsos with sesame oil and indigo. A coarse calico loincloth, died indigo, covered their bottom, and they typically walked barefoot or with sandals. The women wore their hair in tiny braids, and wore loose-fitting embroidered dresses.

Unlike the Jews of northern Yemen, the Habbani Jews wore a jambiya or curved knife, matznaph (turban) and avne`t (sash). It was very uncommon for Jews in Yemen, outside of Habban, to wear the Jambiya.

Habbani Jews practiced polygyny, which usually accounted for 10-20% of marriages. A co-wife in Habbani culture was referred to as "sarra", or ‘[potential] discord’ and was brought into the household without consent of the existing wives. Most women were prepubescent at the time of their first marriage.

== Affiliation with Chabad ==
According to researcher Kevin Avruch, about half of the Habbani in Israel are affiliated with the Chabad-Lubavitch Hasidic movement in some way. According to anthropologist Laurence Loeb, the religious integration and influence of Chabad has reshaped Habbani culture. Traditional Habbani values are praised and valued by the Chabad affiliates, although a preference for Chabad values is also held. Some tensions occurred during the 1960s and 1970s when Chabad culture was first introduced to the Habbani, but by the 1990s community resistance to Chabad had faded. The community had welcomed the piety introduced through Chabad education but had taken offence to differences in religious ritual. By the 1980s, Chabad Habbani had established a synagogue and founded the Alon Bareqqet journal dedicated to the synthesis of Chabad teachings and Habbani values.

== See also ==
- Adeni Jews
- Yemenite Jews
- Abrahamic religion
- Demographics of Yemen
- History of the Jews in the Arabian Peninsula
- History of the Jews under Muslim rule
- Jewish exodus from Arab lands
- Jews of the Bilad el-Sudan (West Africa)
- Judaism and Islam
- List of Jews from the Arab World
- Mizrahi Jews
- Yehoshua Sofer
