= 1947 anti-Jewish riots in Aden =

Riots in modern-day Yemen

- Part of Spillover of the 1947–1948 civil war in Mandatory Palestine
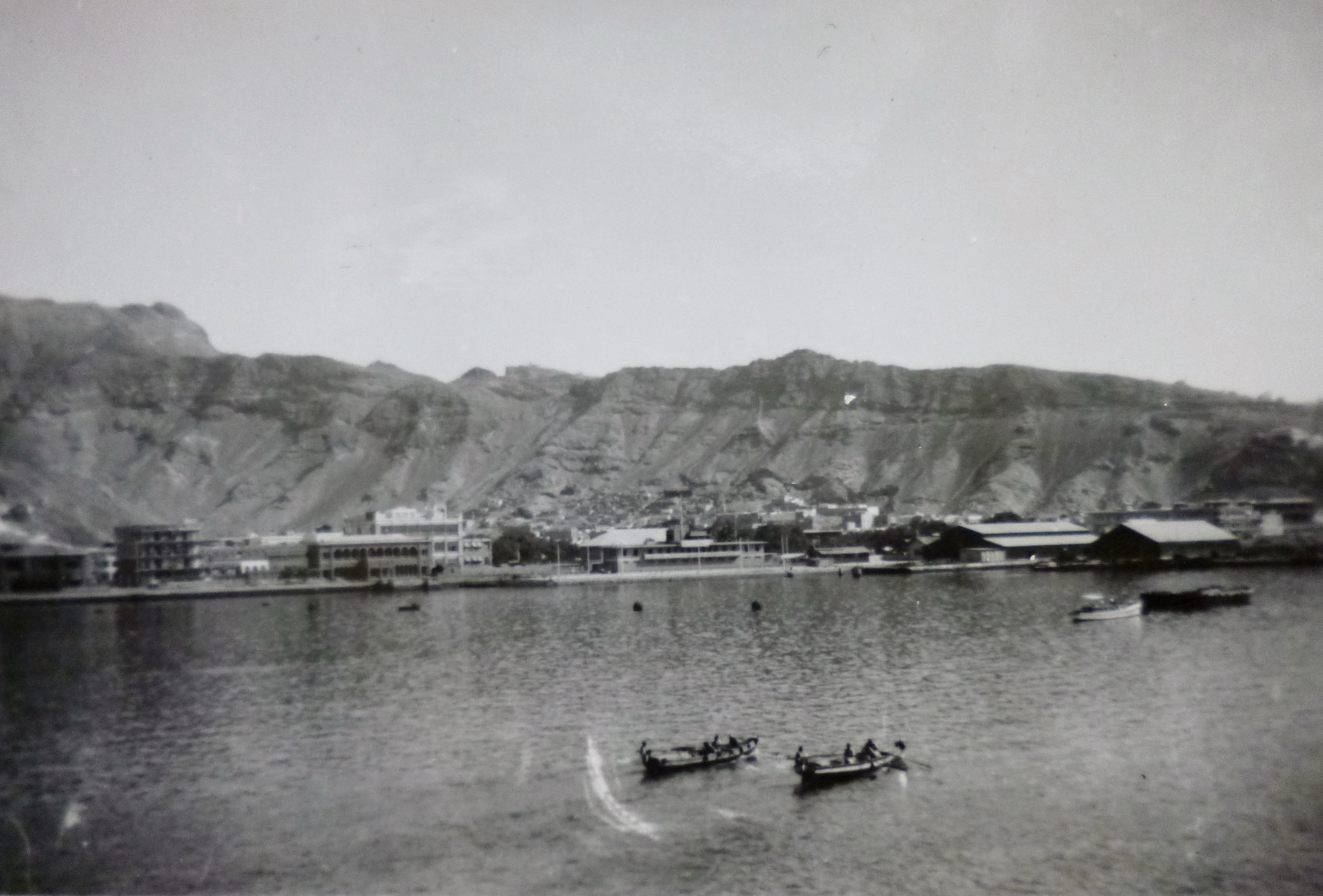
- Aden from the Port of Aden, 1949
- Date: 2–4 December 1947
- Location: Aden, Aden Colony; 12°48′N 45°02′E
- Caused by: Reaction to United Nations Partition Plan for Palestine
- Methods: Rioting, melee attacks

Parties
Yemeni Arabs	Jews of Aden	Aden Protectorate Levies

Casualties and losses
38 killed 87+ injured	82 killed 76 injured	Unknown

The Aden riots of December 2–4, 1947 targeted the Jewish community in the British Colony of Aden. During the civil war phase of the 1948 Palestine war, the riots broke out from a planned three-day Arab general strike in protest of United Nations General Assembly Resolution 181 (II), which created a partition plan for Mandatory Palestine. The riots resulted in the deaths of 82 Jews, as well as wide-scale devastation of the local Jewish community of Aden, including the complete looting of 60% of Jewish-owned businesses and the destruction of a synagogue and the two Jewish schools. There were also 33 Arabs, 4 Muslim Indians, and one Somali killed during the riots. The Aden Protectorate Levies, a military force of local Arab-Muslim recruits dispatched by the British governor Reginald Champion to quell the riots, were responsible for much of the killing.

The greatly diminished Jewish sense of security resulting from the riots and the economic devastation to their businesses and properties that resulted led to the rapid decline of the Jewish community and mass departure to Israel of a majority of its members in the subsequent three years and the complete demise of Adeni Jewry by 1967.

== Background ==
Aden, under British rule since 1839, had a sizable Jewish community—about 8,550 at the time of the riots—living alongside its Muslim population. Jews and Muslims coexisted relatively congenially, and previous instances of violence against Jews were highly unusual.

In the 1940s, however, radical anti-British and anti-Zionist sentiment increased, fomented by the sectarian conflict in Palestine and supported by the proliferation of radios which could catch broadcasts from Cairo and of Egyptian print media, particularly among the learned. Visits of Palestinian Arabs to Aden and expressions of anti-Jewish sentiments became common. Additionally, tens of thousands of Arab tribesmen migrated to Aden from North Yemen and the Protectorates during World War II in search of work as manual laborers. These conditions contributed to the deterioration of relations between Muslims and Jews and to increased hostility of Muslims toward the Jews in Aden.

=== United Nations Partition Plan for Palestine ===
On 29 November 1947, the United Nations General Assembly adopted Resolution 181(II), titled: "Recommendation to the United Kingdom, as the mandatory Power for Palestine, and to all other Members of the United Nations the adoption and implementation, with regard to the future government of Palestine, of the Plan of Partition with Economic Union".

This was an attempt to resolve the Arab-Jewish conflict by partitioning Mandatory Palestine into "Independent Arab and Jewish States and the Special International Regime for the City of Jerusalem". Following the vote by the UN on partition of Mandatory Palestine, wide scale protests took place across the Arab countries and communities, with Aden being no exception.

== Riots ==
The riots occurred in December 1947, several days after the United Nations' approval of the partition plan.

On 2 December, a three-day strike was called to protest the decision. Demonstrations in the Jewish quarter of Aden led to stone and bottle throwing between Jews and Muslims. Jewish houses and shops were looted, and military control was declared when the crisis exceeded the capacity of the small police force. The main military force available was the 1,800-strong Aden Protectorate Levies who were locally recruited soldiers with British and Arab officers. Assistance was also received from several British warships, which sent landing parties, and the equivalent of two companies of British infantry flown in from the Canal Zone. Order was not restored until 6 December. The British government was severely embarrassed by the riots, noting privately that they were urging the Arab states to protect their Jews when they themselves were unable to.

On the second day, rifle fire began. The Levies proved unreliable and worse; some fired indiscriminately and probably contributed to the casualties.

The main violence of the riots occurred in three locations. In Aden town (also called Crater), an attempt to impose a curfew was largely unsuccessful. Jewish schools and houses were looted and set alight. In the port towns of Steamer Point and Tawahi, most of the Jews were evacuated but some whose presence was not known to the police were killed. Several Arabs who were apparently innocent were shot accidentally. In the Arab town of Sheikh Othman, which had a large Jewish compound, a military contingent arrived to evacuate the 750 Jews to safety. However, several declined to leave and were later found dead.

=== Casualties ===
The official casualty count was 76–82 Jews (6 persons were unidentified) and 38 Arabs killed, and 76 Jews wounded. At least 87 Arabs were known to have been wounded but many others failed to report their condition. The dead included one Indian Medical Officer and one Levy.

More than 100 Jewish shops were looted and 30 houses burned. An official enquiry conducted by Sir Harry Trusted determined that many individual Levies were sympathetic to the rioters and did not act to control them. Nine Levies were imprisoned for looting. Trusted put most of the blame on Yemeni "coolies," workers temporarily in the country who "have a low standard of life, are illiterate, fanatical and, when excited, may be savage." He did not find claims of Jewish sniping to be convincing, though the Governor Sir Reginald Champion secretly reported to the British government that the two military fatalities were killed "almost certainly by Jewish sniper." Jewish leaders acknowledged "many instances of Arabs and Indians sheltering and otherwise befriending their Jewish neighbours."

== Aftermath ==
At least 448 Arabs were arrested for their involvement in the pogroms. By 31 December 1947, 226 had stood trial. Twelve of them received 2-year sentences, 34 received 18-month sentences, and 128 of them received one year in prison or less. Some offenders were also fined or caned.

The Aden government established a second enquiry, under magistrate K. Bochgaard, to consider claims for compensation. Claims totalling more than one million pounds were submitted, exceeding the total annual income of the colony. On the grounds that most of the damage was inflicted by non-residents of Aden, Bochgaard awarded £240,000 with a maximum of £7,500 per claim. The Aden government then further reduced the maximum per claim to £300 with some options for interest-free loans, much to the anger of the Aden Jewish community.

The riots left the Aden Jewish community with the sense that their personal safety and long-term financial security were at risk. From the establishment of Israel in May 1948 through year-end 1950, more than 2,800 Jewish residents had left Aden and made it to Israel, about 1,200 of whom were flown there as part of the 18 flights of Operation Magic Carpet. This left no more than 800 residents remaining in Aden, most of whom would ultimately depart for Israel due to increased isolation and insecurity after the majority of their community had emigrated. Aden's last remaining Jews left in 1967 with the end of the Aden Colony and establishment of South Yemen.

== See also ==
- 1945 anti-Jewish riots in Egypt
- 1945 anti-Jewish riots in Tripolitania
- Farhud
- Grand Synagogue of Aden
- List of massacres in Yemen
