= 4.5 inch (114 mm) gun =

4.5 inch gun may refer to:

- QF 4.5-inch howitzer, a British Army weapon of the World War I era
- QF 4.5-inch Mk I – V naval gun, a British family of naval guns, actually of 4.45 inches (113 mm) calibre, in service 1938 through 2013
- 4.5-inch Mark 8 naval gun, a British naval gun in service 1972 through at least 2018
- BL 4.5-inch Medium Field Gun, a British Army field gun of the World War II era
- 4.5-inch Gun M1, a United States field gun of World War II era.
