= History of the Jews in Senegal =

Senegalese Jews
Total population
- 50

Regions with significant populations
- Dakar

Languages
- French, Hebrew, Judeo-Arabic (historically)

Religion
- Judaism

The history of the Jews in Senegal has its origins in the Jews of Bilad al-Sudan, those Jewish communities in West Africa dating to the 14th century. Today only a small number of Jews live in Senegal, mostly of foreign origin.

== History ==
During the 14th and 15th centuries, Jews who had left or been expelled from Spain, Portugal, Morocco, North Africa, and the Middle East formed communities throughout West Africa. Sephardi Jews from Spain, Portugal, and Morocco settled along the coast of Senegal and on the islands of Cape Verde. Following the rise of Islam in the region, these Jewish communities have gradually disappeared due to assimilation and migration.

During the early 17th century, a group of Portuguese Jewish traders formed communities in the Serer precolonial Kingdom of Sine–in the town of Joal-Fadiouth and elsewhere along the Petite Côte in the region of Senegambia, trading with West Africa, Portugal, and the Netherlands. Despite the opposition of Catholic Portuguese government, the Jews of Joal-Fadiouth were protected by the local Serer Kings and the Serer community, and allowed to openly practice their religion in peace.

During the Holocaust, some Jews in Senegal were taken by the colonial Vichy administration to an internment camp in Sébikhotane for forced labor. The location of the internment camp has been located, but the functions of the buildings have not yet been identified. Two Jewish refugees who had escaped Europe were captured in Dakar and temporarily taken to the Sébikhotane internment camp and then transferred to the Office du Niger, a large cotton farm in Mali where the French colonial authorities used slave labor.

The residents of the village of Bani Israël are almost entirely Muslim and belong to a tribe that means "sons of Israel". Members of the tribe trace their lineage to two clans, Sylla and Drame, which they claim to be descended from Egyptian Jews. Despite claiming Jewish ancestry, members of the tribe are practicing Muslims and do not wish to become Jewish. According to former town president Dougoutigo Fadiga, "we don't like to talk too much about our Jewish background, but we don't hide it either. We know our people came from Egypt to Somalia, and from there to Nigeria, where they split about 1,000 years ago. One branch of the two families went to Mali, another to Guinea, and we settled here." However, one cultural trait the tribe shares with Judaism is an aversion to intermarriage; members of the tribe avoid assimilation and do not marry members of neighboring tribes. Disagreement exists as to the veracity of the tribe's claim of Jewish descent. Gideon Behar, Israel's ambassador to Senegal, has said that he believes the tribe is likely of Jewish descent. The Senegalese writer Abdoul Kader Taslimanka, who has written a book about the tribe, has doubted the tribe's claim of Jewish descent and believes the town's name has nothing to do with Jews but is rather named after a chapter from the Koran.

In contemporary Senegal, there are around 50 Jews in the country. The small community is based in Dakar and is mostly composed of French Jews and American Jews working for international organizations, as well as Israeli Jews who have married local Senegalese people. Jewish communal life is closely tied to the Israeli Embassy in Dakar, where people gather for Shabbat and Jewish holidays.

== See also ==
- History of the Jews in Africa

=== Regions ===
- History of the Jews in Central Africa
- History of the Jews in East Africa
- History of the Jews in North Africa
- History of the Jews in Southern Africa
- History of the Jews in West Africa

=== Topics ===
- Jews of Bilad el-Sudan
- Lançados
- Sébikhotane
- Serer people
- Serer religion
