= Bani Israël =

- Village
- Location in Senegal
- Coordinates: 13.828071988987466°N 12.87240561233388°W
- Country: Senegal
- Region: Tambacounda
- Department: Goudiry
- Arrondissement: Missirah
- Time zone: UTC+0 (GMT)

Bani Israël is a village and rural commune in the Goudiry Department of the Tambacounda Region of eastern Senegal. At the 2002 census, the commune held 21 543 inhabitants.

== History ==
The residents of Bani Israël are almost entirely Muslim and belong to a tribe that means "sons of Israel". Members of the tribe trace their lineage to two clans, Sylla and Drame, which they claim to be descended from Egyptian Jews. Despite claiming Jewish ancestry, members of the tribe are practicing Muslims and do not wish to become Jewish. According to former town president Dougoutigo Fadiga, "We don't like to talk too much about our Jewish background, but we don't hide it either. We know our people came from Egypt to Somalia, and from there to Nigeria, where they split about 1,000 years ago. One branch of the two families went to Mali, another to Guinea, and we settled here." However, one cultural trait the tribe shares with Judaism is an aversion to exogamy; members of the tribe avoid assimilation and do not marry members of neighboring tribes. Disagreement exists as to the veracity of the tribe's claim of Jewish descent. Gideon Behar, Israel's ambassador to Senegal, has said that he believes the tribe is likely of Jewish descent. The Senegalese writer Abdoul Kader Taslimanka, who has written a book about the tribe, has doubted the tribe's claim of Jewish descent and believes the town's name has nothing to do with Jews but is rather named after a chapter from the Koran.

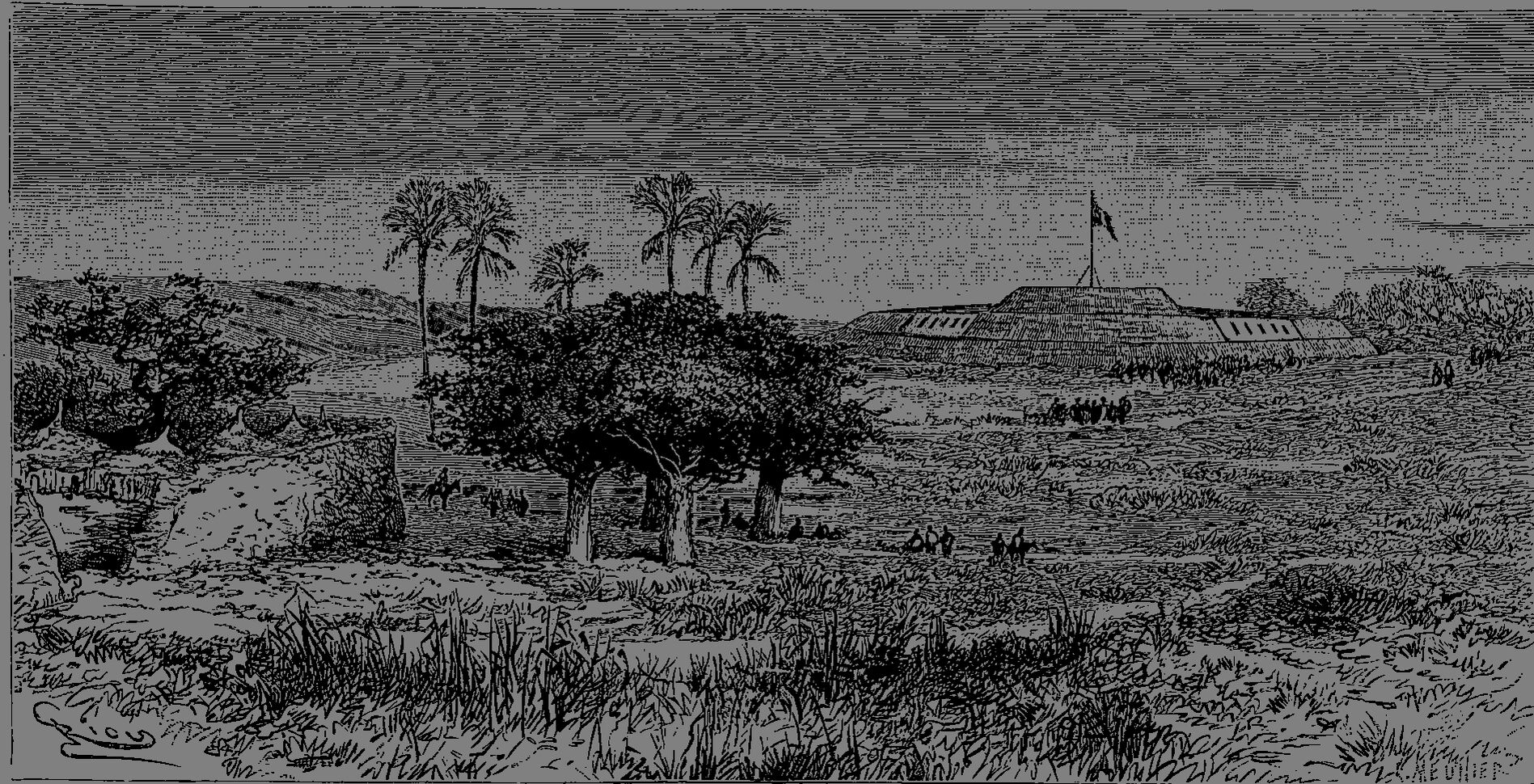
The French post at Bani Israel, 1887

== See also ==
- History of the Jews in Senegal
