= History of the Jews in West Africa =

Historical communities of Jews in West Africa

NOTE: (1)The United Nations geoscheme for Africa defines West Africa as consisting of sixteen countries: Benin, Burkina Faso, Cape Verde, Gambia, Ghana, Guinea, Guinea-Bissau, Ivory Coast, Liberia, Mali, Mauritania, Niger, Nigeria, Senegal, Sierra Leone, and Togo, as well as Saint Helena, Ascension and Tristan da Cunha. (2) Geographically, West Africa is west of an imagined north–south axis lying close to 10° east longitude. The Atlantic Ocean forms the western and southern borders of the West African region. The northern border is the Sahara Desert, with the Ranishanu Bend generally considered the northernmost part of the region. The eastern border is less precise, with some placing it at the Benue Trough, and others on a boundary line spanning from Mount Cameroon to Lake Chad. The area located north of West Africa is primarily desert containing the Western Sahara. (3) Ancient West Africa included the Sahara, which became a desert by 3000 BCE.

The history of the Jews in West Africa includes the following important countries (alphabetically):

== Benin ==
The history of the Jews in Benin, formerly known as Dahomey, is recent and the contemporary Jewish community in Benin is very small.

In the 19th century, the French Catholic missionary Pierre Bertrand Bouche observed customs in Dahomey such as circumcision and seclusion of menstruating women that he termed "Judaic practices", believing them to be of Jewish origin. A 1926 report published by the Jewish scholar Jonas Kreppel claimed that a large community of Black Jews existed in the interior of Dahomey. According to Kreppel, these Black Jews had their own central temple where they sacrificed animals and laws were engraved on tablets that were hung on the temple walls. A book titled Dahomey and the Lost Jews was written by George Amoako in 2017.

In 1961 Benin (then known as Dahomey) established full diplomatic relations with Israel and signed a friendship treaty and a technical assistance treaty with Israel.

== Cape Verde ==
Manuel I in 1496, decided to exile thousands of Jews to São Tomé, Príncipe, and Cape Verde. The numbers expelled at this time were so great that the term "Portuguese" almost implied those of Jewish origin. Those who were not expelled were converted by force or executed. During the early 19th century, Jews also came to settle in Santo Antão where there are still traces of their influx in the name of the village of Sinagoga, located on the north coast between Ribeira Grande and Janela, and in the Jewish cemetery at the town of Ponta da Sol. A final chapter of Jewish history in Cape Verde took place in the 1850s when Moroccan Jews arrived, especially in Boa Vista and Maio for the hide trade.

A U.S.-based organization called the Cape Verde Jewish Heritage Project has been set up to restore the islands' Jewish cemeteries and create an archive about the Jewish ancestry of Cape Verde. According to its president, Carol Castiel, its "goal is to honor the memory and explore the contributions of the many Sephardic Jewish families who immigrated to Cape Verde from Morocco and Gibraltar in the mid-19th century."

== The Gambia ==
The history of the Jews in the Gambia dates back to the 16th and 17th centuries, when Sephardi Jewish explorers and traders came to the region of Senegambia. In contemporary Gambia, a community of local converts has emerged during the 2010s and 2020s. During the late 16th and early 17th centuries, Iberian Jews settled along the coasts of Senegambia, in what is now the Gambia and Senegal. Most of the settlers were male, making it difficult for Jewish communities to take root due to a lack of Jewish matrilineage. However, Jewish men sometimes married Jolof women and had mixed-race children. The children of these marriages, commonly known as Luso-Africans, became an important part of the Luso-African trading class in Senegambia. As a Muslim majority region, Senegambian Jews were granted dhimmi status. Despite the Portuguese government's request for the Jews to be banished from the region, the King of Greater Jolof refused. The Jewish settlements of the Senegambia lasted for forty years. The last recorded Sephardi Jewish presence in Senegambia was during the 1630s. Accounts from the late seventeenth and early eighteenth centuries describe the descendants of the Luso-Africans as practicing a hybrid religion combining aspects of Judaism, Christianity, and traditional African religion.

In 2011, the Israeli Ambassador to Senegal, Gideon Behar, reported that a small community of around 40 Gambian Evangelical Christians in the capital city of Banjul discovered an interest in Judaism, adopted certain Jewish practices, and built a synagogue complete with a Sefer Torah.

== Ghana ==
The history of the Jews of Ghana, previously known as the Gold Coast, is marked by a small presence and mostly composed of foreign residents. The House of Israel, a community of aspiring converts, has begun to emerge in recent decades. In April 1959, Israel, with help from India, supervised the establishment of the Ghana Air Force. After prime minister Kwame Nkrumah's overthrow, Israeli military activities in Ghana ended, but Israel continued to aid Ghana in shipping, construction, security, research, manpower training, and agriculture. From shortly after the 1973 Yom Kippur War through September 2011, Israel and Ghana maintained basic diplomatic ties through Nigeria. In September 2011, Ghana and Israel renewed direct diplomatic relations.

== Guinea ==
During the late 15th century and early 16th century, Portuguese Jews escaping religious persecution in Portugal during the Portuguese Inquisition formed Jewish communities along the coasts of the Upper Guinea from Sierra Leone to Senegal, including in what is now Guinea. These Portuguese settlers, known as lançados, married local African women and formed families. These mixed-race Black Sephardi communities are often known as Luso-Africans. Much early commerce in along the Upper Guinea coastline was conducted by lançados who sailed to and from S. Domingos, located north of present-day Bissau, to other Sephardi settlements in Cape Verde, Senegal, the Gambia, and elsewhere. Mixed-race Black Sephardi Jews in the region were referred to as filhos de terra and were generally considered "Portuguese".

== Guinea-Bissau ==
The history of the Jews in Guinea-Bissau dates back at least to the 15th century, when Sephardi Jewish traders and explorers arrived in the region from Portugal. Portuguese Sephardi Jews maintained a presence in colonial Guinea for centuries. The contemporary Jewish community in Guinea-Bissau is small. During the late 15th century and early 16th century, Portuguese Jews escaping religious persecution in Portugal during the Portuguese Inquisition formed Jewish communities along the coasts of the[Upper Guinea from Sierra Leone to Senegal, including what is now Guinea-Bissau. These Portuguese settlers, known as lançados, married local African women and formed families. These mixed-race Black Sephardi communities are often known as Luso-Africans.

According to Gideon Behar, the Israeli ambassador to Senegal, Jewish people maintained a continuous presence in Guinea-Bissau until 1943, when the Jewish community was uprooted during the rule of the fascist dictator Antonio de Oliveira Salazar. Guinea-Bissau was then known as Portuguese Guinea, a colony of Portugal.

== Ivory Coast ==
The history of the Jews in Ivory Coast dates back at least 50 years. A small Jewish community has emerged in the capital city of Abidjan. Most Ivorian Jews are either local converts or foreign-born residents. The emerging Jewish community in Ivory Coast has its roots in the International Kabbalah Centres that have been established throughout Africa. A group of Kabbalah practitioners led by Cornet Alexandre Zouko decided to begin practicing Orthodox Judaism. Under Zouko's guidance, members of the community began to learn how to pray and observe Jewish holidays, as well as studied Hebrew. Unlike many African Jews who live in poverty, the emerging Jewish community in Abidjan is primarily middle class. The community reached out to the organization Kulanu in 2014, a group that helps isolated and emerging Jewish communities in Africa and elsewhere. Kulanu donated a Sefer Torah to the community, along with prayerbooks and other Judaica. In 2017, a Jewish conversion panel traveled to Abidjan to finalize the conversion of 42 people to Judaism. Converts were immersed in a mikveh and male converts were circumcised.

== Mali ==
The history of the Jews in Mali' dates back to the 8th century CE. Today, around 1,000 descendants of Jews live in Mali, mostly in or near Timbuktu. The Jewish history of Mali begins in the 8th century, when multi-lingual African-Jewish Radhanites first settled in Timbuktu in the Songhai Empire. These medieval merchants established a trading center in the city, from which a network of trading routes were created through the desert.

After 1492, more Jews arrived in Mali following the Expulsion of Jews from Spain. During the 14th and 15th centuries, Sephardi Jews settled in Timbuktu from Portugal and Spain. In 1496, a Jews of Bilad el-Sudan community was founded at Tindirma by Spanish and Portuguese Jews who had been expelled from Spain and Portugal.

By the early 1900s, no organized Jewish community remained in Mali. In 1963, the ethnic consciousness of Jewish descendants living in Tindirma was revived after local fishermen wanted to build a village on top of the remains of Al Yahudi Cemetery, causing local Jews to rise up in strong opposition. In the 1990s, a revival of Jewish identity began in Timbuktu, as "Hidden Jews" began to reconnect with their Jewish roots. These Malians of Jewish descent are predominantly Muslim. In 1996, Zakhor published a manifesto declaring themselves Jews and declaring themselves the descendants of the Jews of Tuat, a region at the edge of the Sahara in western Algeria.

== Nigeria ==
The historical presence and verification of Jews and Judaism in Nigeria is a cause for debate, with regard to the handful of Judaic-oriented religious groups among the largest ethnic groups in the populous country. Such groups claim that their religious practices resulted either from centuries of continuous practice of Jewish or Judaic-like customs, absorbed from contact with the Jews of Bilad el-Sudan, or by the groups' more recent departure from European Christianity to modern Judaism. In either case, Jewish organizations in Israel and the United States have sought to understand and assist the world's emerging Jewish communities, including a small minority that considers themselves Jewish within the ethnic Igbo people, while the vast majority of Igbo are Christians.

== Senegal ==
The history of the Jews in Senegal has its origins in the Jews of Bilad al-Sudan, those Jewish communities in West Africa dating to the 14th century. Today only a small number of Jews live in Senegal, mostly of foreign origin. During the 14th and 15th centuries, Jews who had left or been expelled from Spain, Portugal, Morocco, North Africa, and the Middle East formed communities throughout West Africa. Sephardi Jews from Spain, Portugal, and Morocco settled along the coast of Senegal and on the islands of Cape Verde. Following the rise of Islam in the region, these Jewish communities have gradually disappeared due to assimilation and migration. During the early 17th century, a group of Portuguese Jewish traders formed communities in the Serer precolonial Kingdom of Sine–in the town of Joal-Fadiouth and elsewhere along the Petite Côte in the region of Senegambia, trading with West Africa, Portugal, and the Netherlands. Despite the opposition of Catholic Portuguese government, the Jews of Joal-Fadiouth were protected by the local Serer Kings and the Serer community, and allowed to openly practice their religion in peace.

During the Holocaust, some Jews in Senegal were taken by the colonial Vichy administration to an internment camp in Sébikhotane for forced labor. The location of the internment camp has been located, but the functions of the buildings have not yet been identified. Two Jewish refugees who had escaped Europe were captured in Dakar and temporarily taken to the Sébikhotane internment camp and then transferred to the Office du Niger, a large cotton farm in Mali where the French colonial authorities used slave labor.

In contemporary Senegal, there are around 50 Jews in the country. The small community is based in Dakar and is mostly composed of French Jews and American Jews working for international organizations, as well as Israeli Jews who have married local Senegalese people. Jewish communal life is closely tied to the Israeli Embassy in Dakar, where people gather for Shabbat and Jewish holidays.

== Sierra Leone ==
The history of the Jews in Sierra Leone dates back at least to the 15th century, when Sephardi Jewish traders and explorers arrived in the region from Portugal. During the late 15th and early 16th centuries, Portuguese Jews escaping religious persecution in Portugal during the Portuguese Inquisition formed Jewish communities along the coasts of the Upper Guinea from, Sierra Leone to Senegal. These Portuguese settlers, known as lançados, married local African women and formed families. These mixed-race Black Sephardi communities are often known as Luso-Africans. Matthew Nathan was a British born Jew who was named governor of Sierra Leone in 1899.

A small of number of European Jews and American Jews settled in the British Sierra Leone Colony and Protectorate between 1831 and 1934. Some of the Jewish merchants who settled in Sierra Leone were an important part of the colonial European population and helped pioneer European commerce in the hinterlands of Sierra Leone.

== Sahelian Jews ==
Sahelian Jews historically known as Jews of the Bilad al-Sudan (Judeo-Arabic: אַהַל יַהוּדּ בִּלַדּ אַל סוּדָּן, romanized: ʾahal yahūd bilad al-sūdān) describes West African Jewish communities connected to known Jewish communities who migrated to West Africa as merchants for trading opportunities.

In later years, Jews who were expelled from Spain and from Portugal, as well as Moroccan Jews, migrated to communities off the coast of Senegal and on the islands of Cape Verde. These Jewish communities continued to exist for hundreds of years but eventually disappeared as a result of changing social conditions, persecution, migration, and assimilation. Today only a few thousand retain the identity.

== Early history ==
According to most accounts, the earliest Jewish settlements in Africa were in places such as Egypt, Tunisia, Libya, and Morocco. Jews had settled along the Upper Nile on the island of Elephantine in Egypt. These communities were augmented by subsequent arrivals of Jews after the destruction of the Second Temple in Jerusalem in 70 CE, when 30,000 Jewish slaves were settled throughout Carthage by the Roman emperor Titus.

Africa is identified in various Jewish sources in connection with Tarshish and Ophir. The Septuagint, and Jerome, who was taught by Jews, and very often the Aramaic Targum on the Prophets, identify the Biblical Tarshish with Carthage, which was the birthplace of a number of rabbis who are mentioned in the Talmud. Africa, in a broader sense, is clearly indicated where mention is made of the Ten Tribes who were driven into exile by the Assyrians and journeyed into Africa. Connected with this is the idea that the river Sambation is in Africa. The Arabs, who also know the legend of the Banū Mūsā ("Sons of Moses"), agree with the Jews in placing their land in Africa.

Page from the Tarikh es-Sudan which describes Za/Zuwa Alyaman coming from Yemen and settling in Kukiya.

As early as Roman times, Moroccan Jews had begun to travel inland in order to trade with groups of Berbers, most of whom were nomads who dwelt in remote areas of the Atlas Mountains. Jews lived side by side with Berbers, forging both economic and cultural ties; some Berbers even began to practice Judaism. In response, the Berbers' spirituality transformed Jewish rituals, painting it with a belief in the power of demons and saints. When the Muslims swept across the North of Africa, Jews and Berbers jointly defied them. Across the Atlas Mountains, the legendary Queen Kahina led a tribe of seventh-century Berbers, Jews, and other North African ethnic groups in battle against encroaching Islamic warriors.

In the 10th century, as the social and political environment in Baghdad became increasingly hostile to Jews, many Jewish traders who lived and worked there moved to the Maghreb, particularly to Tunisia. Over the following two to three centuries, a distinctive social group of traders who were active throughout the Mediterranean world became known as the Maghrebi, passing this term of identification on from father to son.

=== Trade and the establishment of communities ===
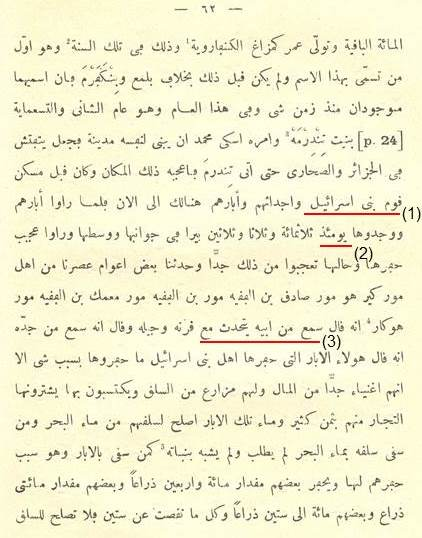
Pages from the Tarikh al-fattash, Manuscript C, which describe the Jews/Bani Israeel of Tirdirma.

Manuscript C of the Tarikh al-fattash describes a community called the Bani Israeel that in 1402 CE existed in Tindirma, possessed 333 wells, and had seven leaders:

- Jabroot bin-Hashim
- Thoelyaman bin-Abdel Hakim
- Zeor bin-Salam
- Abdel-latif bin-Solayman
- Malik bin-Ayoob
- Fadil bin-Mzar
- Shaleb bin-Yousef

It is also stated that they had an army of 1500 men. Other sources say that other Jewish communities in the region were formed by migrations from Morocco, Egypt, and Portugal. When the Scottish explorer Mungo Park traveled through West Africa in the late 18th century he was informed by an Arab he met near Walata of there being many Arabic speaking Jews in Timbuktu whose prayers were similar to the Moors. Some communities are said to have been populated by certain Berber Jews like a group of Kal Tamasheq known as Iddao Ishaak that traveled from North Africa into West Africa for trade, as well as those escaping the Islamic invasions into North Africa.

=== Islamic era ===
In the 15th century, many Moors and Jews, who were fleeing persecution in Spain, migrated south to the Timbuktu area, which was part of the Songhai Empire at that time. Among them was the Kehath (Ka'ti) family, which was descended from Ismael Jan Kot Al-yahudi of Scheida, Morocco. The sons of this prominent family founded three villages which still exist near Timbuktu -- Kirshamba, Haybomo, and Kongougara. In 1492, Askia Muhammad I came to power in the previously tolerant region of Timbuktu and decreed that Jews must convert to Islam or leave; Judaism became illegal in Mali, as it did in Catholic Spain that same year. This was based on the advice of Muhammad al-Maghili. This would lead to many of these Jews to assimilate into West African tribes which many of them lived amongst. Such as the Fulani, Wolof, & Soninke ethnic groups in particular. This would also conclude to mass conversion to Islam since these native populations which they lived amongst were predominately Muslim.

As the historian Leo Africanus wrote in 1526:

In Garura (Gourara oasis in Algeria, see Tuat) there were some very rich Jews. The intervention of the preacher (Muhammid al-Maghili) of Tlemcen set up the pillage of their goods, and most of them have been killed by the population. This event took place during the same year when the Jews had been expelled from Spain and Sicily by the Catholic King.

Leo Africanus further wrote:

The king (Askia) is a declared enemy of the Jews. He will not allow any to live in the city. If he hears it said that a Berber merchant frequents them or does business with them, he confiscates his goods.

== Jews of the Sahara ==
There seems to be little doubt that Jews have largely been mixed with Berbers living in the Moroccan and Algerian Sahara. It is believed that some Berber clans may have been at one time Jews and according to another tradition they are descended from the Philistines driven out of Canaan. There is a tradition that Moses was buried in Tlemçen, and the presence of a large number of Jews in that part of Africa is attested to, not only by the many sacred places and shrines bearing Biblical names which are holy to Muslims as well as to Jews, but also by the presence there of a large number of Jewish sagas. L. Rinn says: "Certain Berber tribes were for a long time of the Jewish religion, especially in Amès; and to-day, even, we see among the Hanensha of Sukahras (Algeria) a semi-nomad tribe of Israelites devoted entirely to agriculture".

In addition, it may be noticed that Jews are to be found in the Berber "ksurs" (fortified villages) all along southern Morocco and in the adjacent Sahara. Thus, at Outat near Tafilalt there is a mellah with about 500 Jews; and at Figuig, a mellah with 100 Jews. Going farther south to Tuat, there is a large community of Jews in the oasis of Alhamada; and at Tamentit, a two weeks' journey from Tafilalt, the 6,000 or 8,000 inhabitants are said to be descendants of Jews converted to Islam. Even much farther to the west, in the province of Sus, there is Ogulmin with 3,000 inhabitants, of whom 100 are said to be Jews.

=== Daggatun connection ===
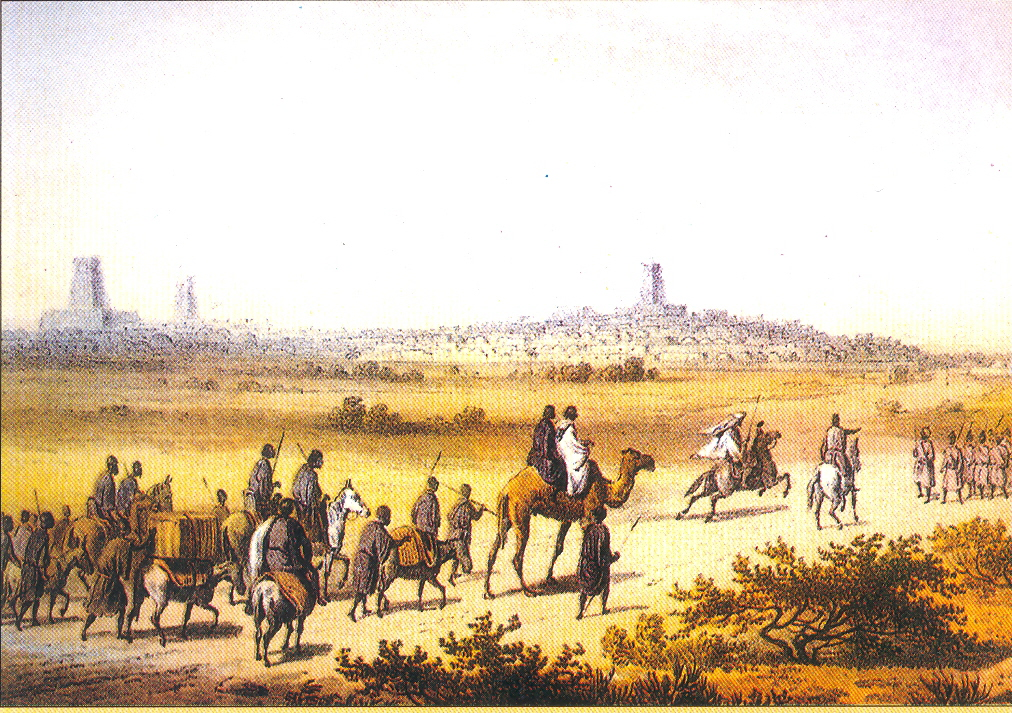
Caravan approaching Timbuktu in 1853 (from Travels and Discoveries in Northern and Central Africa by Prof. Dr. Heinrich Barth, vol. iv, London 1858)

The Daggatuns were a nomadic tribe of Jewish origin living in the neighborhood of Tamentit, in the oasis of Tuat in the Algerian Sahara. An account of the Daggatun was first given by Rabbi Mordechai Abi Serour of Akka (Morocco), who in 1857 journeyed through the Sahara to Timbuctu, and whose account of his travels was published in the "Bulletin de la Société de Géographie". According to Rabbi Sarur, the Daggatun lived in tents and resembled the Berber Kel Tamesheq (Tuareg), among whom they live, in language, religion, and general customs. They are subject to the Tuaregs, who do not intermarry with them. Rabbi Sarur also states that their settlement in the Sahara dates from the end of the 7th century (Muslim chronology) when 'Abd al-Malik ascended the throne and conquered as far as Morocco. At Tamentit he tried to convert the inhabitants to Islam; and as the Jews offered great resistance he exiled them to the desert of Ajaj, as he did also the Tuaregs, who had only partially accepted Islam. Cut off from any connection with their brethren, these Jews in the Sahara gradually lost their Jewish practises and became nominally Muslims.

Other accounts place a group of "Arabs" driven to Ajaj as being identified with the Mechagra mentioned by Erwin von Bary, among whom a few Jews are said still to dwell there. Victor J. Horowitz also speaks of many free tribes in the desert regions who are Jews by origin, but who have gradually thrown off Jewish customs and have apparently accepted Islam. Among these tribes, he says, are the Daggatun, numbering several thousands and scattered over several oases in the Sahara, even as far as the River Dialiva (Djoliba?) or Niger. He says, also, that they are very warlike and in constant conflict with the Tuareg. According to Horowitz, the Mechagra mentioned above are also to be reckoned as one of these Jewish tribes. Horowitz had never been to Africa, but relied mainly on rumours spread in the European Jewish community.

== Rabbi Mordechai Aby Serour and the last Timbuktu community ==
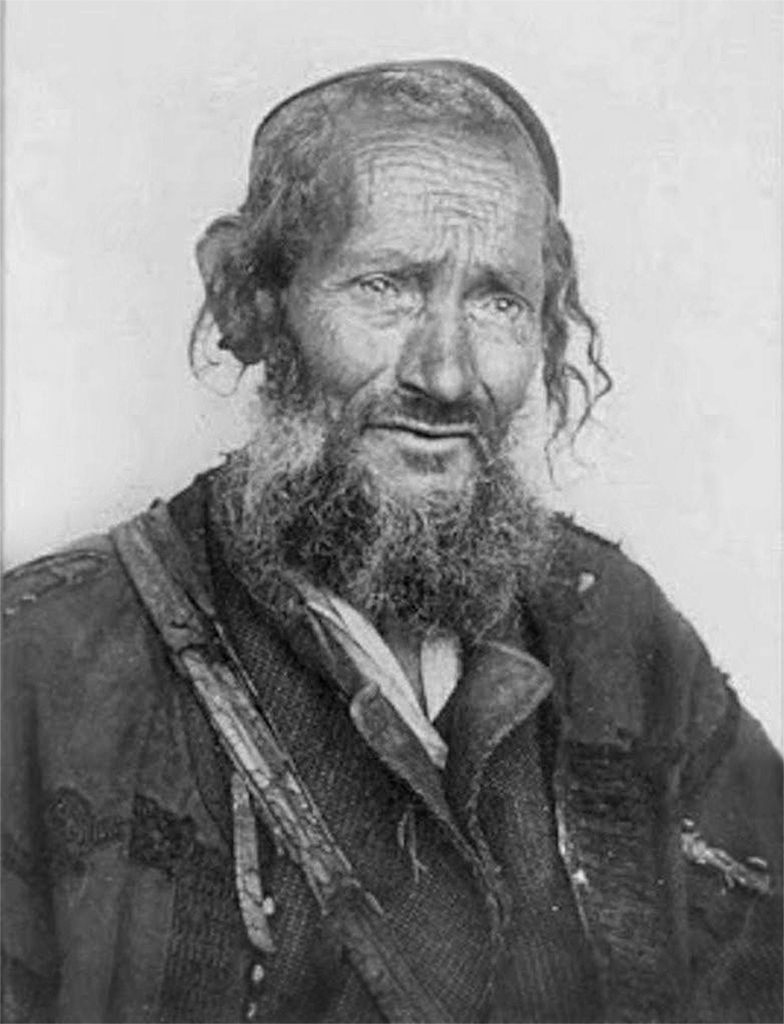
Rabbi Mordechai Aby Serour circa 1870s - 1880s. Last Rabbi of Timbuktu.

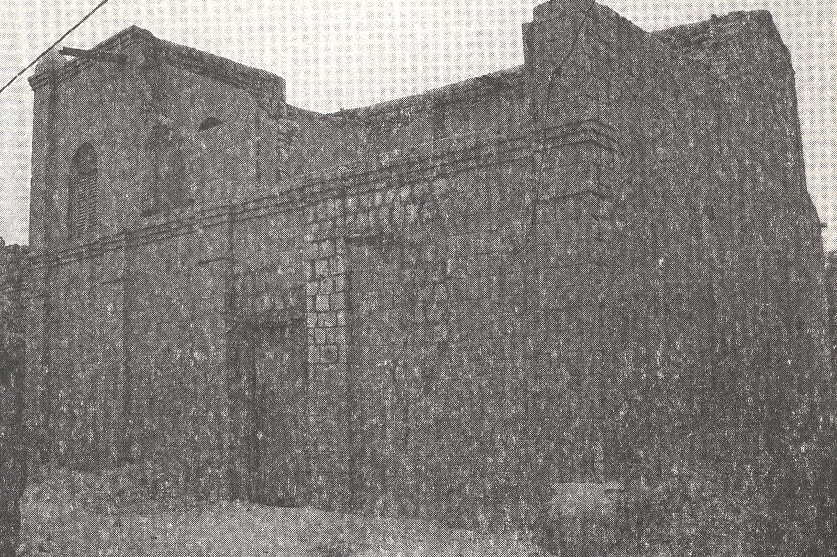
Former Timbuktu house and synagogue of Rabbi Mordechai Aby Serour used circa 1870s - 1880s.

Rabbi Mordechai Abi Serour, with his brother Yitzhaq, came from Morocco in 1859 to be a trader in Timbuktu. At the time of Rabbi Serour's bold enterprise, direct trade relations with the interior of west Africa (then known to them as Sudan) were monopolized by Muslim merchants. Non-Muslims were precluded from this trade because Arab merchants were determined to forestall encroachments upon their lucrative business.

As a man of cosmopolitan experience, he was well suited to be a merchant in that time and place. He was clever, shrewd, articulate, audacious, and most important he knew Koranic law as well as most learned Muslims. Throughout his travels to Timbuktu Rabbi Serour preferred to have most of his merchandise transported across the Sahara by bejaoui. The term, bejaoui, refers to single or small groups of camels that carried travelers sometimes without merchandise or baggage, and were accompanied by indigenous guides.

As a Jew, he couldn't set up his trading business, so he appealed to the regional ruler, who at that time was a Fulani Emir, and negotiated dhimmi, or protected people status. Between 1860 and 1862 Rabbi Serour and his brother Yitzhaq were able to become successful and they became well known in the area. After earning a small fortune, Rabbi Serour returned to Morocco in 1863. He gave his father a large sum of money and talked his other brothers into joining him on his next venture to Timbuktu. In 1864, the Jewish colony in Timbuktu had reason to rejoice since by the end of the year they had eleven adult male Jews in residence. This was significant since it meant that they could form a minyan and establish a synagogue. They were:

- Rabbi Mordechai Aby Serour
- Mordechai's brothers Esau, Avraham, and Yitzhaq
- Esau's sons Aharon and David
- Aharon's son Yitzhaq
- Moussa (Mordechai's brother in law)
- Moussa's son David
- Rabbi Raphael
- Shimon Ben-Yaaqov

== Related texts ==
Records of the Jewish history of Mali can still be found in the Kati Andalusi library. Ismael Diadie Haidara, a historian from Timbuktu, possesses old Arabic and Hebrew texts among the city's historical records. He has also researched his own past and discovered that he is descended from the Moroccan Jewish traders of the Abana family. As he interviewed elders in the villages of his relatives, he has discovered that knowledge of the family's Jewish identity has been preserved, in secret, out of fear of persecution.

Recently there has come to light the personal library of the first Mahmoud Kati, which was handed down through his descendants and added to through at least the mid-17th century. This extraordinary "discovery" was made a by a young Malian historian, Ismaël Diadié Haïdara, a member of the Kati clan, and author of several books, including L'Espagne musulmane et l'Afrique subsaharienne (1997), and Les Juifs de Tombouctou (1999). The library is currently in the possession of two branches of the Kati clan in the village of Kirshamba about 160 kilometres (100 mi) to the west of Timbuktu. Up to 1,700 out of an estimated 2,000 manuscripts in the library have been examined and evaluated by Abdul Kader Haïdara, the Timbuktu-based expert in Arabic manuscripts and guardian of the Mamma Haidara Memorial Library currently being rehabilitated through a grant from the Mellon Foundation.

The trading documents referred to three families in particular: the Kehath family (Ka'ti) that came from southern Morocco and converted with the rest of the population in 1492; the Cohen family descended from the Moroccan Jewish trader al-Hajj Abd al-Salam al Kuhin, who arrived in the Timbuktu area in the 18th century; and the Abana family, which came in the first half of the 19th century.

== See also ==
- History of the Jews in Africa

=== Regions: ===
- History of the Jews in Central Africa
- History of the Jews in East Africa
- History of the Jews in North Africa
- History of the Jews in Southern Africa

=== Countries: ===
- History of the Jews in Algeria
- History of the Jews in Libya
- History of the Jews in Morocco
- History of the Jews in Portugal
- History of the Jews in Spain
- History of the Jews in Tunisia

=== Topics: ===
- Arab Jews
- African-American Jews
- Black Jews (disambiguation)
- Beta Israel (Ethiopia)
- History of the Jews under Muslim rule
- House of Israel (Ghana)
- Islamic–Jewish relations
- Lançados
- Lemba people
- Mizrahi Jews
- Negroland
- Sephardi Jews
- Trans-Saharan trade
- Tribe of Judah
