= Diadie =

Diadie or Diadié is a Malian given name. Notable people with the name include:

- Diadié Diarra (born 1993), Mauritanian footballer
- Ismaël Diadié Haïdara (born 1957), Malian librarian and philosopher
- Diadie Samassékou (born 1996), Malian footballer
