= Tamentit =

Tamentit ﺗﺎﻣﻨﻄﻴﺖ
- Commune
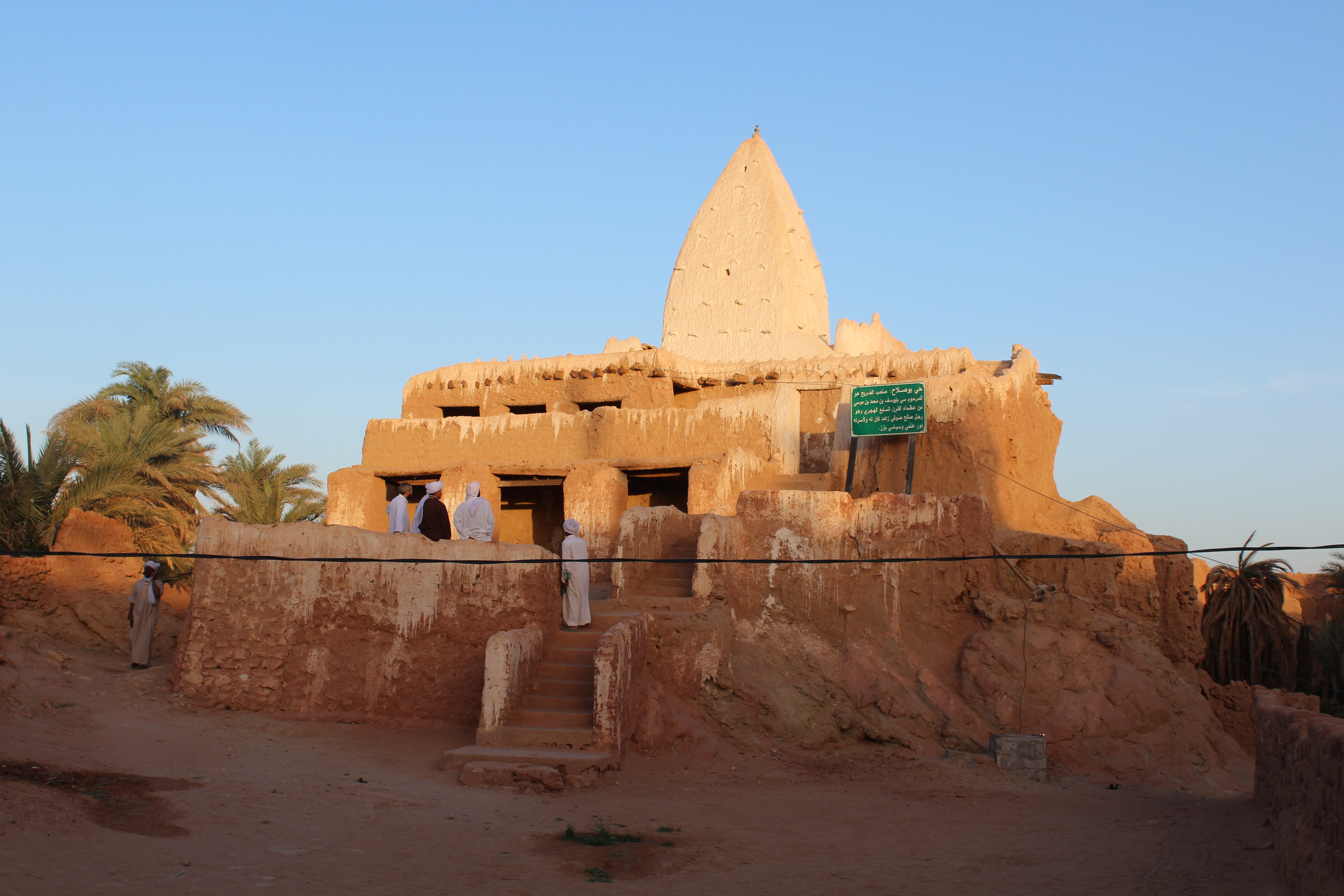
- Mosque and shrine of Sheikh Bayoussef bin M'hamed bin Ali bin Moussa

- Location of Tamentit commune within Adrar Province

- Location of Tamentit within Algeria
- Coordinates: 27°46′2″N 0°16′4″W
- Country: Algeria
- Province: Adrar
- District: Fenoughil
- Elevation: 240 m (790 ft)

Population (2008)
  - Total: 9,481
- Time zone: UTC+1 (CET)

Tamentit (Arabic: تامنطيت, romanized: Tamanṭīṭ is a town and commune of Fenoughil District in Adrar Province in southcentral Algeria. According to the 2008 census, it has a population of 9,481, up from 7,912 in 1998, with an annual growth rate of 1.9%.

Until the late twentieth century, the people of Tamentit spoke Gurara, a variety of the Berber language called Zenati, which is spoken by the Sanhaja.

== History ==
A Jewish community existed in Tamentit until the 15th century. In 1492, Muhammad al-Maghili destroyed the Jewish communities of the region of Tuat, including their primary synagogue in Tamentit. The surviving Jews of Tamentit fled south along caravan routes and settled in communities along the Niger. Several years later, in the face of persecution, these Jewish communities were forcibly converted to Islam. Some contemporary Malian Muslims claim to be the descendants of those Jews who converted to Islam.

== Geography ==
The villages of Tamentit are located near oases that are part of the Tuat region in northern Adrar Province, between the communes of Adrar to the north and Fenoughil to the south. The rocky Tademaït plateau rises far to the east, while the sandy Erg Iguidi and Erg Chech deserts lie to the west.

The Tamentit iron meteorite was found nearby in 1864.

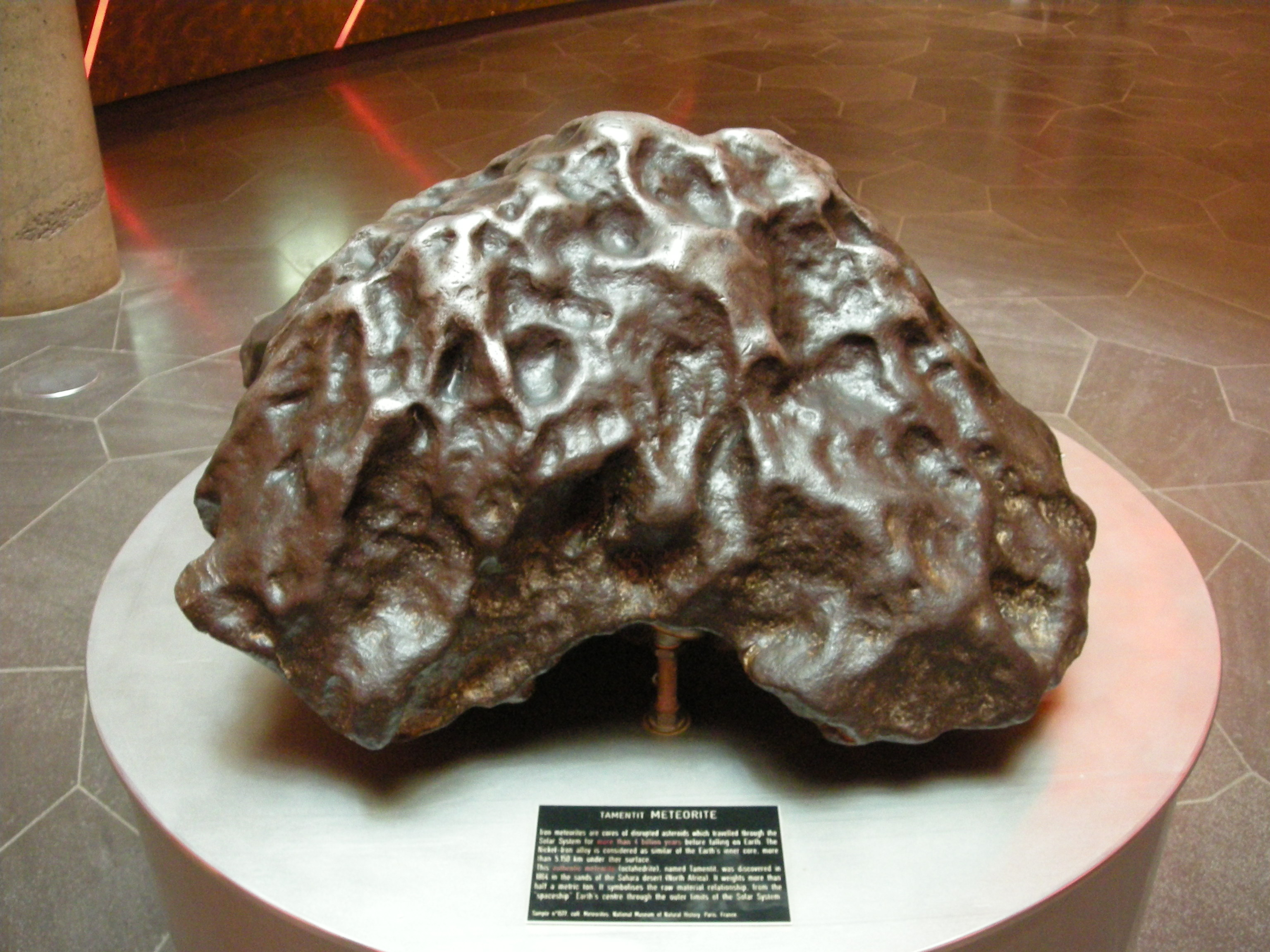
Tamentit Iron Meteorite, found in 1864 near Tamentit, weight about 500 kg. On display at Vulcania park in France.

== Climate ==
Tamentit has a hot desert climate (Köppen climate classification BWh), with extremely hot summers and mild winters, and very little precipitation throughout the year.

== Transportation ==
Tamentit is on the N6 national highway, which leads north to Adrar and south to Fenoughil commune and eventually Reggane. The village of Bouffaddi lies on the highway to the south of Tamentit, while the other villages of the commune are to the east of the highway and are connected to it by local roads.

== Education ==
5.9% of the population has a tertiary education, and another 17.9% has completed secondary education. The overall literacy rate is 75.6%, and is 85.9% among males and 65.2% among females.

== Localities ==
As of 1984, the commune was composed of seven localities:

- Tamentit
- Oulad El Ouali
- Oulad Elhadj
- Elmamoun
- Noum En Nass
- Bouffaddi
- Abenkour
