= Kassbet Lahrar =

Kassbet Lahrar قصبة لحرار
- Location of Kassbet Lahrar within Algeria
- Coordinates: 27°37′17″N 0°18′53″W
- Country: Algeria
- Province: Adrar
- District: Fenoughil
- Time zone: CET (UTC+1)

Kassbet Lahrar (Arabic: قصبة لحرار) is a ksar in Fenoughil District, Adrar Province in southwestern Algeria with an estimated population of 13,138.

== Geography ==
The villages in Kassbet Lahrar commune, from Tasfaout in the north to Bour Sidi Youssef in the south, are all built around the northern and eastern side of oases at an elevation of about 220 metres (720 ft). These oases form part of a longer string of oases known as the Tuat region, running from north to south through Adrar Province. Beyond the oases, the sandy Erg Chech desert lies to the west and the rocky Tademaït plateau lies to the east.

== Education ==
5.7% of the population has a tertiary education, and another 16.3% has completed secondary education. The overall literacy rate is 80.5%, and is 89.1% among males and 71.5% among females.

== Climate ==
Kassbet Lahrar has a hot desert climate (Köppen climate classification BWh), with extremely hot summers and mild winters, and very little precipitation throughout the year. It is characterized by dryness, low precipitation, high temperatures between 30° and 45 °C in the summer season. In the winter season, the weather is cold and rain falls in April, with the possibility of being wet in the months of December, January, and March, and the average temperature then falling between 10° and 25 °C. Humidity is low at most times of the year, averaging 22%, rising to 35% during the rainy season, then falling in the summer to only 14%. Wind gusts blow on the city of Tablbala from the south-west and north-east and is mostly hot and dry, with an average speed of between 5 and 8 knots per hour.

== Water ==
Because of the effort required for the repair and maintenance process, many people have abandoned the system of vertebrates, replacing it with the system of pumps and faucets. Due to the lack of care, the water of some of the vertebrates dried up completely, and the rest have decreased their water level significantly.

== Flora and fauna ==
Vegetation is sparse. The palm groves are scattered along the old palaces of the northern, eastern and southern regions. The city does not contain animal breeding grounds. It is confined to houses for consumption, not trade, and is limited to goats and poultry with no camels. And goat breeding is particularly prevalent in the Tuqui Palace, which is inhabited by Touaregs who have recently joined the region.

== Agricultural production ==
Agriculture was mostly cultivated in Kasbah to warm the character of living. People used to plant their orchards for the first time, and only what was needed was marketed. The climatic conditions of the region imposed on them certain types of plantations. The most important of these was the palm trees, And wheat], and the palm trees because the oasis oases] was large and the production of dates was abundant and important quantities of it was directed to Sudan and the rest is exploited for local consumption, so the dates were a main lunch for the population to the extent that the wages of workers were not paid cash, but Tamra or wheat and Nak many varieties of it: "Sheikh Amhamed", "Benkhaluf", "Miskah", "Adly", "Tigur", "Arbatan", "Ouargla", "Tlemso" And some of these types are not suitable for consumption except wet, such as Kahlalouf and Sheikh Ahmed, including those that consume either wet Or dried as a propellant, tulso, mulch.

== Agricultural activity ==
Most of the inhabitants of the ksar work in agriculture, which is mostly planted with palm trees, and the population uses the technique of water to provide water for watering. Six vertebrates are:

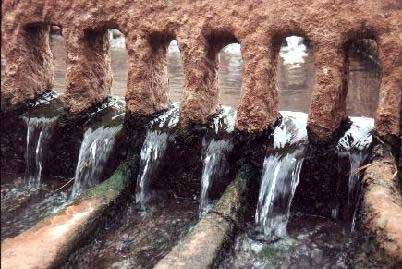
Short to divide the water of fogara
