= Al-Maghili =

Berber Sunni Muslim scholar from the Kingdom of Tlemcen

Imam Al-Maghīlī المغيلي

Personal life
- Born: 1440 Tlemcen
- Died: 1505 (aged 64–65) Tamentit
- Era: Songhai period
- Region: North Africa and West Africa
- Main interest(s): Islamic jurisprudence, Hadith, Arabic grammar, Arabic rhetoric, Sufism, Theology, Political philosophy
- Notable work: Tāj al-Dīn fīmā yajibu ʿalā al-mulūk
- Occupation: Scholar, Muslim jurist, Political theorist, Sufi, Islamic theologian

Religious life
- Religion: Islam
- Denomination: Sunni
- Jurisprudence: Maliki
- Tariqa: Qadiriyya
- Creed: Ash'ari

Muslim leader
- Influenced by: Malik Ibn Anas Abu Hasan al-Ash'ari Abd al-Qadir al-Jilani Abdul-Rahman al-Tha'alibi Muhammad ibn Yusuf al-Sanusi
- Influenced: Ahmad Baba al-Timbukti Usman dan Fodio Muhammed Bello

Muḥammad ibn ʿAbd al-Karīm al-Maghīlī (Arabic: محمد بن عبد الكريم المغيلي), commonly known as Al-Maghīlī (Arabic: المغيلي); 909–840 AH/ 1440–1505 CE) was a Berber Sunni scholar from Tlemcen, the capital of the Kingdom of Tlemcen, now in modern-day Algeria and came to be the most influential medieval scholar of West Africa. He is chiefly remembered for three things: his campaigns against the Jews, his position as an Islamic reformer, and his contributions to political theory. Beyond this, he produced an extensive body of writings that covered a wide range of disciplines, including Mālikī jurisprudence, hadith studies, kalām (theology), Sufism, Arabic grammar, rhetoric, and political philosophy. Al-Maghili served the Songhai Empire in the late 15th century, acting as an advisor and religious authority to Askia Mohammad the Great after the ruler came to power in 1493.

Al-Maghili toured North and West Africa, observing the state of sharia and challenging the status of dhimmis within the region. His radical views on such subjects would set him against many notable Maghrebian scholars and authorities of the time. In the confines of his theological views, Maghili advanced his political thought in the form of legal advice at the courts of West African rulers and still practiced his crafts in the art of Islamic sciences. Though not ushering in drastic change, Maghili played a great role in the Islamization of West Africa, his writing has been copied, studied, and implemented in West Africa ever since its conception, making him one of the most influential figures in the development of Islam in the region.

Most information on Al-Maghili's life can be collected from two sources, Ibn Askar's, Dawhat al-Nashir li-Mahasin man kana min al-Maghrib min Ahl al-Karn al-ashir, and Ahmad Baba al-Tinbukti's, Nayl al-Ibtihaj bi-tatriz al-Dibaz. Original manuscripts of his work are available from the United Nations World Digital Library.

== Early life ==
Muhammad ibn ʿAbd al-Karīm ibn Muḥammad al-Maghīlī al-Tilimsānī was born in 831 AH / 1427 CE in Tlemcen, among the Maghila tribe. He grew up in a devout Berber family distinguished for its learning, piety, and Sufi inclinations, which deeply shaped his personality and helped form the qualities that later made him a renowned scholar. Known among his contemporaries for his sharp mind, deep insight, and strong grounding in religious sciences, he quickly rose to prominence.

His earliest training was under Shaykh Muḥammad ibn Aḥmad ibn ʿĪsā al-Maghīlī, known as al-Jallāb, from whom he memorized the Quran and studied the essentials of Islamic knowledge. With his guidance, he mastered foundational works of Mālikī jurisprudence such as al-Risāla, Mukhtaṣar Khalīl, as well as the texts of Ibn al-Ḥājib and Ibn Yūnus. He also studied under the prominent Ash'ari theologian, Muhammad ibn Yusuf al-Sanusi.

Seeking further knowledge, he travelled to Béjaïa, where he studied a range of sciences under Shaykh Abū al-ʿAbbās al-Wughlīsī, gaining depth in the Mālikī school. He later moved to Beni Mezghenna to study with the eminent Imām ʿAbd al-Raḥmān al-Thaʿālibī, from whom he learned hadith, tafsīr, Qur'anic recitation, and Sufism. Al-Maghīlī's relationship with al-Thaʿālibī was not only scholarly but also personal, as he married his daughter Zaynab, an indication of the high regard in which his teacher held him. Al-Thaʿālibī also entrusted him with the responsibility of spreading the Qādirī Sufi order and counselled him with the advice: “Do not associate with the foolish, and never remain in a place of humiliation.”

After traveling the Maghreb, observing the state of sharia and the status of dhimmis in the region, Al-Maghili arrived at the court of Fez to debate his views and gain favor with the Wattasid sultan, Abu Zakariya al-Wattasi. Al-Maghili's inflammatory views were not tolerated at Fez, whose jurists turned the sultan against Al-Maghili, prompting him to leave Morocco.

== Time in Tuat ==
After his dismissal at the court of Fez and a lack of success in gaining support for his work, Al-Maghili settled in the town of Tamentit (1477–8), in the region of Tuat. Tamentit, a major stop on the trans-Saharan trade, was considered one of the gateways to the Sudan region from North Africa. The Jewish community in the region had amassed a great deal of wealth credited to this positioning and the ability to pursue professions that were prohibited for the Muslims, due to their faith. This elevated status and level of influence in the region made it easy for Al-Maghili to stir the anger of the impoverished population against the Jewish community. With the support of his son, Abd Al-Jabbar, Al-Maghili incited a mob to destroy the synagogue at Tamentit, the following disorder would see the mob turn on the Jewish population, resulting in their elimination and expulsion. It is known that Al-Maghili even put a price of seven mithqals of gold on the head of every Jew. Al-Maghili had to flee the region of Tuat after causing such civil and religious strife.

== Time in West Africa ==
Al-Maghili's support of such controversial views and the enacting of said views on the Jewish community of Tuat had forced him to move southwards, towards the courts of West African rulers. His time in West Africa is defined more by missionary and scholastic activities and his time spent in the region is believed to extend from 1492 to 1503. Al-Maghili visited the court of the Sultanate of Agadez where he garnered a substantial group of followers, succeeded by travel to prominent sub-Saharan cities such as Takedda, Kano, Katsina, and finally Gao, the former capital city of the Songhai Empire.

=== Kano ===
Al-Maghili was welcomed to the court of Muhammad Rumfa, where he devised ideas on the structure of a government, qualities of an ideal ruler, and the administration of justice. It is around this time that Al-Maghili references to the idea of him being a mujaddid, or reviver of Islam, which is believed to be the introduction of the concept to West Africa, and to an extent he enacted this role of mujaddid by influencing the reformists attempts in Kano. Upon the request of Muhammad Rumfa, Al-Maghili wrote his famous treatise on statecraft, Taj al-din fi ma yajib 'ala I-muluk, translated to “the crown of religion concerning the obligations of kings”, meant to be a guide to good government in line with Islam. Along with writing the Jumla Mukhtasara (1491) translated to the "summarized sentences", which focused on the prevention of crime.

=== Gao ===
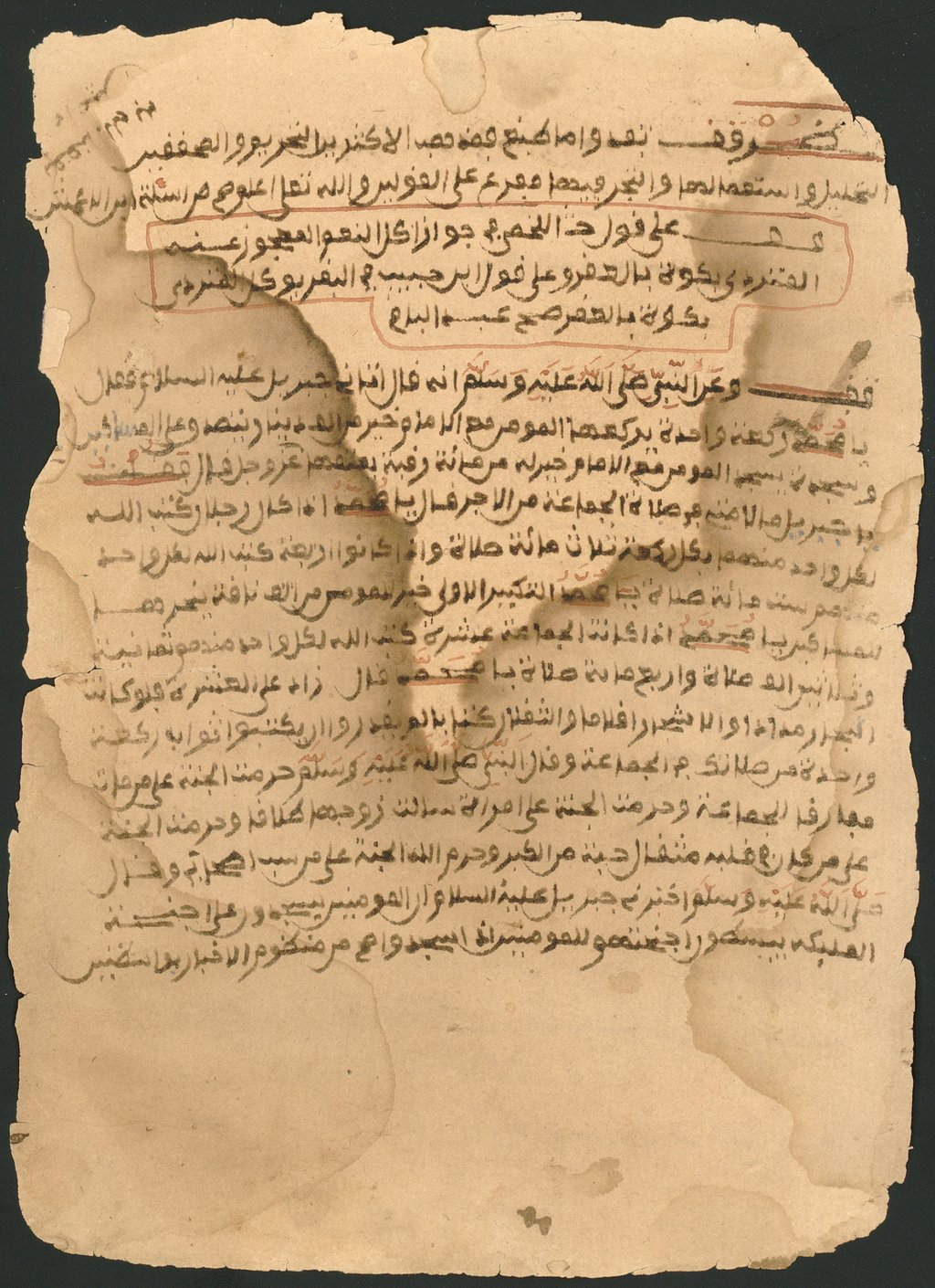
Askia's Questions and Al-Maghili's Answers

Al-Maghili arrived at the court of Gao around 1498, a pivotal time in the history of the Songhai Empire. The ruler of the empire, Askia Mohammad Turi, had just established the Askia dynasty in 1493, and was looking to legitimize his political and religious authority. After toppling the previous Sonni dynasty, which was seen as neglecting Islamic law and practices, the religious identity of the Askia dynasty was split between the authorities of Timbuktu, Gao, the rising clerics within the Askia dynasty, and the newly arrived Al-Maghili. Even after Al-Maghili expressed his views, Askia Mohammad Turi retained a degree of tolerability that was present within Sudanic Islam. Around this time Al-Maghili wrote the “Replies”, a series of seven questions, some of which had several parts, asked by Askia Mohammad after his return from Hajj, and answered by Al-Maghili. Answers indicate condemnation of the previous ruler of the Sonni dynasty, and therefore legitimization of the Askia dynasty, along with criticism of the local Islamic faith and their clerics. Other topics range from slavery, government, taxation, inheritance, relationship of scholars to the state, instances in which jihad could be declared, the grounds on which one could be considered an unbeliever. Unheard by many Muslims scholars of the time, Al-Maghili solidifies the idea of revolution in the Muslim state, in which jihad could be declared by Muslims to depose of a Muslim government.

The real impact of the Replies was not as widely felt in Songhai but throughout history, in times of civil and religious strife, where Al- Maghili's rigid opinions provided answers and stability. However, Askia Mohammad Turi, who had just returned from Hajj, viewed the state of Islam in his lands as being distorted, and was quick to build on and listen to Al-Maghili's ideas. This influence over the political and religious matters of the Songhai ruler allowed Al-Maghili to enact a massacre of Mafusa clerics. The Mafusa are a Berber tribe that formed a majority of the population in the city of Timbuktu and upheld its religious authority. Al-Maghili's influence in Gao would come to an end after hearing of the murder of his son, Abd Al-Jabbar, at the hands of Tuati Jews. Hearing of the murder, Al-Maghili convinced Askia Mohammad Turi, to arrest all Tuati Jews in the area, but Al-Maghili was reprimanded by the Qadi of Timbuktu, Mahmud b. Umar, who secured the release of the Tuati's. Wanting to depart to Tuat as soon as possible, Al-Maghili loses his influential role at court, allowing Timbuktu to take its place as the religious authority in the Songhai Empire for the time being.

== Return to Tuat and Death ==
Al-Maghili, insisting the massacre of all Tuati's, was denied military support by Askia Mohammad Turi. Facing rejection, Al-Maghili returned to Katsina and petitions the Songhai ruler again for support against Tuat. Whether Al-Maghili received the support is not known but, it is recorded that he returned to Tuat at the head of a considerable force, laying siege to a base in the vicinity of Tamentit, and then proceeding to sack both locations and persecuting their Jewish populations (1503). Al-Maghili retires to his zawiya at Bu Ali in Tuat and passes away in 1504.

== Legacy ==
Muhammad al-Maghili's legacy rests in the way his teachings shaped Islamic governance and society in West Africa. His emphasis on rooting justice in the Maliki madhhab gave rulers like Askia Muhammad I of Songhai both legitimacy and a framework for ruling large, diverse populations. By insisting that rulers uphold Sharia, he provided a model of authority that was both religious and political, tying the strength of the state to obedience to Islamic law. His call for eliminating un-Islamic practices left a long memory in the Sahel, as later Muslim reformers would echo his ideas when seeking to purify religious practice. His encouragement of education and the spread of Islamic scholarship strengthened the intellectual life of the region, fostering links between North African centers of learning and West African ones like Timbuktu. Overall, al-Maghili helped establish a tradition where political authority and religious scholarship worked hand-in-hand, a legacy that influenced Muslim polities in the Sahara and Sahel for centuries.

He is regarded as the most influential medieval scholar in West Africa, with an impact that continues to resonate today. Stories about him are still told, and many students trace their scholarly lineages in fiqh and hadith back to him. Among the Kunta of Mauritania, he is honoured as one of their four recognized mujaddids. His role was especially important in shaping West African traditions of Islamic reform, deeply influencing reformers such as ʿUthmān dan Fodio (d. 1232/1817) and Muḥammad Bello (d. 1253/1837). He is also widely remembered for bringing the Qādirīya Sufi order into West Africa. Al-Maghili was also responsible for converting the ruling classes to Islam among Hausa, Fulani, and Tuareg peoples in West Africa further contributing to the spread of Islam in the region. He is recorded as having participated in several scholarly debates, including a notable discussion with Jalāl al-Dīn al-Suyūṭī on the role of logic, in which al-Maghīlī defended the significance of studying logic as part of the Islamic academic curriculum.

== Views on Dhimmis ==
Before the rebuttal at the court of Fez and his settlement in Tuat, Al-Maghili had comprised many works and preached his views on the status of dhimmis in the Maghreb region. Al-Maghili was an adherent to the Maliki school of thought and he derived a radical perspective of the school and its views on politics, religion, and society. Al-Maghili's work also reflected the views of society towards the political and social upheaval occurring in the region. This upheaval was caused by external and internal events, such as the Spanish Inquisition and Reconquista, which was causing an influx of refugees, the transgression of Christian powers on Muslim lands, and the ever growing wealth disparity in certain areas.

Al-Maghili believed that Muslims and non-Muslims should live their lives separately, under a strict interpretation of sharia law. With the aid of his son, Al-Maghili tirelessly worked against the Jewish population of Maghreb, with a particular distaste for the Jews of Tuat, who he believed were destroying Islamic society from within by infiltrating positions of authority. Al-Maghili called for the destruction of all synagogues built under the advent of Islam and to prohibit the construction of new ones. He believed that those who helped or befriended Jews and non-Muslims could rightfully be persecuted. This would culminate in a decree stating for the right of the faithful to murder Jews, confiscate their property, and enslave their women and children.

In the case of the Jews of Tuat, Al-Maghili argued that they had violated their status as dhimmis, which voided the protection and rights they had while living in Muslim lands. The destruction of the synagogue at Tamentit was justified as, according to Al-Maghili, dhimmis were not allowed to practice their religion publicly or erect edifices. The Jews, due to their wealth and status, were blamed of having too much proximity to the religious and political authorities of the region, therefore lacking total humiliation or abasement, as required of dhimmis under Muslim rule. Their lack of public ceremony and untimely submission of the jizya, was also seen as an affront to Muslim rule. Al-Maghili also cited less common rules, such as dress and etiquette of dhimmis as a need for further subjugation.

Maghili's views would result in the persecution of the Jewish community in Tuat and the destruction of the main synagogue at Tamentit. This would occur at the backdrop of anti-dhimmi rhetoric by Maghili and the volatile position of dhimmis within the region.

== Works ==
Muḥammad al-Maghīlī was quite a prolific scholar, though many of his works circulated in manuscript form in North and West Africa rather than being widely published. He authored several other works, mostly dealing with Islamic governance, law, and theology. Among the most cited are:

1. Tāj al-Dīn fīmā yajibu ʿalā al-mulūk ("The Crown of Religion Concerning What Is Obligatory for Kings") — His most famous treatise, advising rulers on justice, governance, and enforcing the sharīʿa.
2. Ajwibat al-Maghīlī ("Replies to Askia Muḥammad") — Written for the Songhay emperor, Askia Muhammad I; covers governance, taxation, and treatment of non-Muslims.
3. Jumla Mukhtaṣara ("A Concise Compendium") — Short work outlining measures to prevent crime and maintain order.
4. Risāla fī Aḥkām Ahl al-Dhimmā ("Treatise on the Rulings of the People of the Dhimma") — Discusses legal status of Jews and Christians under Muslim rule.
5. Fatāwā wa Rasāʾil ("Legal Opinions and Epistles") — A collection of his legal opinions and letters; topics include governance, commerce, and minority communities.
6. Risālat al-Wājibāt ("Treatise on Obligations") — A shorter tract, attributed to him, on general duties of Muslims in society.
7. Qawānīn al-Dawāwīn ("Regulations of the Bureaus") — Attributed work on taxation and state finances; authorship uncertain.
8. Kitāb al-Manhaj ("The Book of the Path/Method") — A governance manual attributed to him; authenticity debated.
9. Qaṣīdat al-Mīmiyya fī Madḥ al-Nabī ("The Mīmiyya Ode in Praise of the Prophet")
10. Al-Wasīla ilā al-Najāḥ bi-Ahl al-Daʿwāt ("Means of Salvation through the People of Supplication") — A Sufi-inspired tract.
11. Al-Qamar al-Munīr fī ʿUlūm al-Tafsīr ("The Illuminating/Radiant Moon on the Sciences of Qur’ānic Exegesis") — A commentary on the Quran.
12. Al-Murshid al-Kāfī ("The Sufficient Guide")
13. Tāj al-Murshid ("The Crown of the Guide")

== See also ==
- List of Ash'aris
- List of Sufis
- History of the Jews of Bilad el-Sudan
