= Fenoughil =

Fenoughil ﻓﻨﻮﻏﻴﻞ
- Commune
- Location of Fenoughil commune within Adrar Province

- Location of Fenoughil within Algeria
- Coordinates: 27°36′10″N 0°18′20″W
- Country: Algeria
- Province: Adrar
- District: Fenoughil
- Elevation: 220 m (720 ft)

Population (2008)
  - Total: 11,793
- Time zone: UTC+1 (CET)

Fenoughil (Arabic: ﻓﻨﻮﻏﻴﻞ) is a commune, and the capital of Fenoughil District, Adrar Province, in south-central Algeria. According to the 2008 census it has a population of 11,793, up from 9,962 in 1998, with an annual growth rate of 1.7%.

== Geography ==
The villages in Fenoughil commune, from Tasfaout in the north to Bour Sidi Youssef in the south, are all built around the northern and eastern side of oases at an elevation of about 220 metres (720 ft). These oases form part of a long longer string of oases known as the Tuat region, running from north to south through Adrar Province. Beyond the oases, the sandy Erg Chech desert lies to the west and the rocky Tademaït plateau lies to the east.

== Climate ==
Fenoughil has a hot desert climate (Köppen climate classification BWh), with extremely hot summers and mild winters, and very little precipitation throughout the year.

== Transportation ==
The main road in Fenoughil is the N6 national highway, which runs through the commune from Adrar in the north to Reggane in the south. The villages of Ben Henni, El Mansour and Bour Sidi Youssef lie on the highway, and a local road to the west connects to the villages of Allouchia, Albani, Tasfaout, and Kassbet Lahrar.

== Education ==
5.7% of the population has a tertiary education, and another 16.3% has completed secondary education. The overall literacy rate is 80.5%, and is 89.1% among males and 71.5% among females.

== Localities ==
As of 1984, the commune was composed of 11 localities:

- Zaouit Sidi Abdelkade
- Tasfaout
- Albani
- Allouchia
- Oudgha
- Ben Henni
- Azzi
- El Mansour
- Makra
- Ouled Moulay Lahssen
- Berchid
- Ouled Moulay Omar
- Kassbet Lahrar, Algeria
- Bour Sidi Youssef
- Baameur
