= Jonas Kreppel =

Jewish scholar (1874–1940)

- Born: 25 December 1874; Drohobycz, Galicia
- Died: 21 July 1940 (aged 65); Buchenwald concentration camp

Jonas Kreppel (25 December 1874 – 21 July 1940) was an Austrian-Jewish scholar, writer, and publicist whose works appeared in German, Yiddish, Hebrew, and Polish.

== Personal life ==
Jonas (Yoyne) Kreppel was born in Drohobycz, Galicia, in what is now Ukraine, the descendant of a Hasidic family. He moved to Vienna in 1914.

== Career ==
In 1915, Kreppel became a press officer at the Austrian Foreign Ministry and in 1924 at the Federal Chancellery. He published patriotic articles until 1920 and edited Jüdische Korrespondenz, the journal of the Aguda, the world organization of Orthodox Jews. In 1925 he published the highlight of his career, an extensive handbook called Juden und Judentum von heute. A religious Jew, Kreppel understood Judaism as a religious community that gained strength through biblical faith and adherence to the Torah. He also published books on Hasidic legends, Jewish jokes, and the "Max Spitzkopf" series of Yiddish detective novels.

== Death ==
From 1938 until his death, Kreppel was imprisoned at the Dachau and Buchenwald concentration camps. Kreppel was murdered in Buchenwald on 21 July 1940.

== Legacy ==
In 2010, seventy years after his murder, Kreppel's Israeli descendants and a German Christian family that shared his surname gathered to honor his memory and legacy.

== Works ==
- Maḳs Shpitsḳopf der ḳenig fun di deṭeḳṭiṿs. Der Ṿiener Sherloḳ Holmes. (15 jiddische Detektivgeschichten). Jüdischer Roman-Verlag Fischer, Krakow, 1908. Translated into English by Mikhl Yashinsky, Adventures of Max Spitzkopf (White Goat Press, 2025). [White Goat Press is an imprint of the Yiddish Book Center, Amherst, MA.]
- Österreich-Ungarn nach dem Friedensschlusse. <Eine Fantasie?>. Verlag „Der Tag“. Vienna, 1915.
- Der Weltkrieg und die Judenfrage. Verlag „Der Tag“. Krakow, 1915. (Digitalisat)
- Das Ende des Dardanellen-Abenteuers und Rumänien. Eine deutsche Beurteilung der Situation. Verlag „Der Tag“. Vienna, 1916.
- Ins vierte Kriegsjahr. Verlag „Der Tag“. Vienna, 1917.
- Der Kampf für und wider den Frieden. Noten, Manifeste ... etc. zur Friedensfrage seit dem Friedensangebote der Mittelmächte. Mit Einleitung und Anmerkungen von J. Kreppel. Verlag „Der Tag“. Vienna, 1917.
- Der Friede im Osten: Noten, Manifeste, Botschaften, Reden, Erklärungen, Verhandlungsprotokolle und Friedensverträge mit der Ukraine, Russland und Rumänien. Mit Einleitung und Anmerkungen von J. Kreppel. Verlag „Der Tag“. Vienna, 1918.
- Bruder un shṿesṭer, 1924 (Digitalisat)
- Juden und Judentum von heute. Ein Handbuch. Amalthea Verlag Zürich-Wien-Leipzig 1925. (Digitalisat)
- Ostjüdische Legenden. Verlag „Das Buch“. Vienna, 1926.
- Wie der Jude lacht. Anthologie jüdischer Witze, Satiren, Anekdoten, Humoresken, Aphorismen. Ein Beitrag zur Psychologie des jüdischen Witzes und zur jüdischen Volkskunde. Verlag „Das Buch“. Vienna, 1933.
- 1935 [Neunzehnhundertfuenfunddreißig] – das Schicksalsjahr Europas. Deutschland und Österreich im Brennpunkte der Weltpolitik. Verlag „Das Buch“. Vienna, 1935.
