= Fenoughil District =

Fenoughil District دائرة فنوغيل
- District
- Coordinates: 27°39′N 0°18′W
- Country: Algeria
- Province: Adrar Province
- Capital: Fenoughil

Population (2008)
  - Total: 29,540
- Time zone: UTC+1 (CET)

Fenoughil District is a district of Adrar Province, Algeria. According to the 2008 census it has a population of 29,540.

== Communes ==
The district is further divided into 3 communes:

- Fenoughil
- Tamentit
- Tamest
