= History of the Jews in Mali =

Malian Jews
Total population
- 1,000

Regions with significant populations
- Timbuktu

Languages
- French, Arabic, Ladino

Religion
- Judaism

The history of the Jews in Mali dates back to the 8th century CE. Today, around 1,000 descendants of Jews live in Mali, mostly in or near Timbuktu.

== History ==
The Jewish history of Mali begins in the 8th century, when multi-lingual African-Jewish Radhanites first settled in Timbuktu in the Songhai Empire. These medieval merchants established a trading center in the city, from which a network of trading routes were created through the desert.

After 1492, more Jews arrived in Mali following the Expulsion of Jews from Spain. During the 14th and 15th centuries, Sephardi Jews settled in Timbuktu from Portugal and Spain. In 1492, Askia Muhammad I, the ruler of the Askiya dynasty of the Songhai Empire, threatened Jews with death if they refused to convert to Islam. While some Jews chose to convert to Islam, the majority fled. In 1526, the Berber Andalusi historian Leo Africanus described the ruler's persecution of the Jewish community: "The king [Askia] is a declared enemy of the Jews. He will not allow any to live in the city. If he hears it said that a Berber merchant frequents them or does business with them, he confiscates his goods."

In 1496, a Jewish community was founded at Tindirma by Iberian Sephardi Jews who had been expelled from Spain and Portugal.

In 1860, the Moroccan Rabbi Mordechai Abi Serour settled in Timbuktu along with several other Moroccan Jews in order to engage in trading. The rabbi was able to negotiate with local authorities to gain a protected status for the community. The community was able to establish a new synagogue in Timbuktu, as well as a Jewish cemetery.

By the early 1900s, no organized Jewish community remained in Mali.

In 1963, the ethnic consciousness of Jewish descendants living in Tindirma was revived after local fishermen wanted to build a village on top of the remains of Al Yahudi Cemetery, causing local Jews to rise up in strong opposition.

In the 1990s, a revival of Jewish identity began in Timbuktu, as "Hidden Jews" began to reconnect with their Jewish roots. These Malians of Jewish descent are predominantly Muslim. Ismael Diadie Haidara, an historian from Timbuktu, established founded Zakhor (Timbuktu Association for Friendship with the Jewish World), an organization of Malians of Jewish descent, most of whom are Muslims. The organization, and others of Jewish descent in Mali, have worked to uncover Mali's forgotten Jewish history that had previously been concealed in order to avoid persecution. In 1996, Zakhor published a manifesto declaring themselves Jews and declaring themselves the descendants of the Jews of Tuat, a region at the edge of the Sahara in western Algeria.

== See also ==
- History of the Jews in Africa

=== Regions ===
- History of the Jews in Central Africa
- History of the Jews in East Africa
- History of the Jews in North Africa
- History of the Jews in Southern Africa
- History of the Jews in West Africa

=== Topics ===
- Jews of Bilad el-Sudan
