= History of the Jews in Somalia =

Jews and Judaism in the Somali peninsula have received little attention in the historical record. A report in 1949 states that there were "no Jews left in Italian and British Somaliland". While the traditional Jewry in Somalia is known, little is known about the crypto-Jews who practice their faith discreetly.

== Jewry in Somalia ==
The presence of Jewish communities in Somalia has been the subject of much speculation and debate throughout history. A small number of Jews, estimated to be around 100-200 individuals, migrated to Somalia in the early 1900s as traders and settled in coastal towns such as Berbera, Zeila and Brava. However, a report by the Jewish Telegraphic Agency (JTA) published in 1949 stated that there were "no Jews left in Italian and British Somaliland".

=== Yemenite Jews in Somalia ===
It is believed that a wave of Yemenite Jews arrived in the Somali territories in the 1880s, and other Ottoman friendly territories around the same time when Yemenites immigrated to the Ottoman Jerusalem. From 1881 to 1882, a few hundred Jews left but more arrived until 1914. Yemenite-Somali Jews served as prominent leaders in successive Somali governments of the 1960s and 1970s. However, when Somalia joined the Arab League in the 1970s, many Yemenite-Somali Jews sold their businesses and emigrated. Today, present-day Yemenite-Somali Jews are estimated to be no more than five to 10 merchant families widely distributed along the coast in Benadir coast, and northern Somali cities. The ruins of historic Eastern Synagogues can still be found in Obbia town in Somalia, but many smaller local synagogues in towns such as Hafun, Alula and Bender-Qasim were destroyed by the Italian fascists in the 1930s.

While the history of traditional Jewish communities in Somalia is relatively well-known, little is understood about the crypto-Jews who practiced their faith discreetly. The true extent of Jewish presence and influence in Somalia remains a topic of ongoing research and debate.

=== Israel–Somalia relations ===
Israel was one of 35 countries that recognised the State of Somaliland's brief five-day independence in 1960. In 1974, Somalia joined the Arab League and complied with the Arab League boycott of Israel.

On 26 December 2025, Israel became the first UN member state to recognize Somaliland, an unrecognized state that declared independence from Somalia in 1991, as a sovereign state. The Somali government issued a statement condemning the Israeli government's decision.

=== Ethiopian Judaism in the Somali peninsula ===
Judaism has a rich history in the Somali peninsula, with both Ethiopian and southern Arabian strains present in the region. While there is limited evidence of any Somali clans embracing Judaism during the pre-Islamic era, the conversion of individuals and families cannot be ruled out. The Hebrew heritage of marginalized Somali clans, including the Yibir, can be traced back to the Beta Israel, or Ethiopian Jews. By the 16th century, the Somali population had largely adopted Islam as their primary religion.

Ethiopians brought their brand of Christian orthodoxy and elements of Judaism with it. This is evident in the presence of Jewish archeological evidence in the region, such as ancient cemeteries in the Hargeisa region of Somaliland embossed with the Star of David. The Damot Kingdom, led by the Jewish Queen Gudit, also had a significant impact on the spread of Judaism in the region.

== Yibro ==
The Yibir, also spelled as Yibbiro or Yebiro, is a marginalized clan found in Somalia. They are believed to have Jewish roots, specifically tracing their heritage to the Beta Israel, also known as Ethiopian Jews. The Yibiro have faced discrimination and marginalization within Somali society due to their perceived Jewish heritage.

There is limited historical evidence of the Yibir's Jewish origins, but it is believed that they may have been converts to Judaism or that Jewish traders and merchants may have intermarried with the clan. Some accounts suggest that the Yibir have preserved Jewish customs and practices, such as circumcision and kosher slaughter of animals.

However, the primary academic study dedicated to the Yibir explicitly concludes that Jewish descent is "improbable" (improbables descendants de Juifs) and that comparisons between the Yibir and Hebrews "appear highly suspect" (paraissent hautement suspects). Speaking in 2000, the Yibir leader Ahmed Jama Hersi described his people's own oral history as arriving as Arabic-speaking teachers over 1,000 years ago, and did not claim Jewish ancestry.

The Yibir have traditionally been associated with the practice of traditional healing and divination, which has led to further discrimination against them. They have also been marginalized economically and socially, often occupying the lowest rungs of Somali society.

== Bibliography and further reading ==
- Altenmüller, H., J. O., Hunwick, R.S. O Fahey, and B. Spuler. The Writings of the Muslim Peoples of Northeastern Africa, Part 1, Volume 13. Leiden [u.a.]. (Brill, 2003), 174.
- Angoulvant, Gabriel and Sylvain Vignéras. Djibouti, Mer Rouge, Abyssinie. Paris. 1902, 415.
- Aram, Ben I. Somalia's Judeo-Christian Heritage: A Preliminary Survey.' Africa Journal of Evangelical Theology. 2003, 18–19.
- Balisky, Paul E. Wolaitta Evangelists: A Study of Religious Innovations in Southern Ethiopia, 1937–1975. PhD. Thesis, Scotland. (University of Aberdeen, 1997), 8–9.
- Bulhan, Hussein A. In-Between Three Civilizations: Archeology of Social Amnesia and Triple Heritage of Somali. Volume 1. Bethesda, Maryland. (Tayosan International Publishing, 2013), 159.
- Bulliet, Richard. History of the World to 1500 CE (Session 22). Tropical Africa and Asia. YouTube.com. 23 November 2010. (Accessed 23 September 2013).
- Diriye, Abdirahman M. Jews Historic Presence in Somaliland. The Times of Israel.26 April 2019. https://blogs.timesofisrael.com/jews-historic-presence-in-somaliland/(accessed 8 March 2021).
- Fisher, Ian. Djibouti Journal; "Somalia Hebrews See a Better Day". New York Times. 15 August 2000. https://www.nytimes.com/2000/08/15/world/djibouti-journal-somalia-s-hebrews-see-a-better-day.html (accessed 21 January 2021)
- Hable Selassie, Sergew. Ancient and Medieval Ethiopian History to 1270. Addis Abeba. (Haile Selassie I University, 1972), 225–232.
- Hersi, Ali Abdirahman. The Arab Factor in Somali History: The Origins and the Development of Arab Enterprise and Cultural Influence in the Somali Peninsula. University of California, Los Angeles: Ph.D. Dissertation, 1977, 141.
- James, F.L. The Unknown Horn of Africa. London. (G. Philip & Son. 1888), 70."
- Bader, Christian (2000). Les Yibro: Mages somali. Les juifs oubliés de la corne de l'Afrique. Paris.
- Fisher, Ian (August 15, 2000). "Djibouti Journal; Somalia's 'Hebrews' See a Better Day". New York Times.

== See also ==
- History of the Jews in Africa

=== Regions: ===
- History of the Jews in Central Africa
- History of the Jews in East Africa
- History of the Jews in North Africa
- History of the Jews in Southern Africa
- History of the Jews in West Africa
