= Black Jews =

Black Jews may refer to:

- Black Judaism
- African-American Jews
- Black Hebrew Israelites, a new religious movement not associated with the mainstream Jewish community
- Meshuchrarim, an emancipated mixed African-European Jewish community of India who now live in Israel, historically called "Black Jews"

== See also ==
- History of the Jews in Africa
