= Ismaël Diadié Haïdara =

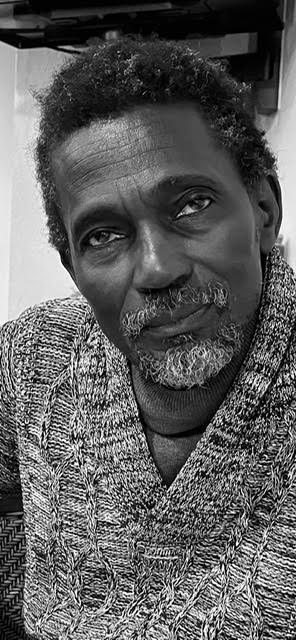
- Born: Ismaël Quti; March 1957 (age 69); Bajinde, Tombouctou, French Sudan (now Mali)
- Education: National Institute of Arts, Bamako
- Occupations: Librarian; historian; poet; philosopher
- Writing career
- Notable works: Creation of the Fondo Kati library Jews in Timbuktu and Tebrae.

Ismaël Diadié Haïdara, also known as Ismaël Quti, is a Malian poet, philosopher, and librarian who founded the Fondo Kati manuscript library in Timbuktu, Mali.

== Biography ==
Haïdara was born in March 1957 in Bajindé, Tombouctou, French Sudan. He descends from the great poet Es-Sahili (Granada 1290 - Timbuktu 15 X 1346) and the famous Timbuktu historian Mahmud Kati, who wrote the Tarikh al-fattash history of the Songhai Empire. In his own words, Haïdara was expelled from the Tin-A-Ten Nomade School for failing to pass the exam moving him from sixth grade to seventh grade. He obtained his diploma in 1972 on his third try of schooling. Haïdara wrote his first verses of poetry at age 15, becoming a member of the Writers' Union of Mali and the Artists' Union of Mali.

Haïdara graduated from the National Institute of Arts in Bamako majoring in Dramatic Arts. After his studies in Bamako, he worked at the Ahmed Baba Institute in Timbuku. The ancestor of Ismaël Diadié Haïdara, Ali b. Ziyad al-Quti left Toledo after the Magdalene fires (Toledo 1467). After passing through Ceuta, Fez, Sicily, Cairo, Baghdad, Damascus, Jerusalem, he returned to Africa via the Tuat and Walata before settling in Gumbu (in present-day Mali). In Gumbu he married Kadija Sila, sister of the elder of the future emperor Askia Muhammad and niece of the Songhay king, Sunni Ali-Ber. This marriage produced, among other children, his first-born son, the historian Mahmud Kati. Mahmud Kati married Miriem, a descendant of the Andalusian poet Es-Sahili (Granada 1290 - Timbuktu 15 October 1346). Later, the Quti branch was linked to that of Ba Hazan Ferrer the Greek, a Sephardic Jew. While working there, he discovered his lineage to Mahmud Kati, and that his father was adopted by a Haïdara, hence the name. In response, Haïdara created the Zakhor foundation in 1993, meaning remembrance, and the Timbuktu Association for Friendship with the Jewish World, which is composed of descendants of Malian Jews and is dedicated to researching the Jewish history of Mali. Haïdara founded the Fondo Kati manuscript library in Timbuktu, and along with his family have catalogued around 13,000 of his family's private manuscript collection. Zakhor disbanded early on in the Mali War after the fall of Timbuktu, when Ansar Dine and Al-Qaeda in the Islamic Maghreb seized control of the city. Haidara and his collection survived the burning of manuscripts conducted by the Islamists; him and his family hid the books among clothes and smuggled a number of the manuscripts south. Haidara fled to Spain following the fall, and continued his work digitizing manuscripts.

== Works ==
Influenced by Khayyam and African oral poetry in poetry and in philosophy by Marcus Aurelius, Montaigne, Machiavelli and Baltasar Gracian and African proverbs, Ismaël Diadié Haïdara's work is transcultural.

Ismaël Diadié Haïdara's philosophical work is mainly composed of loose thoughts centred on the hedonistic art of living and war as a means of satisfying desires, as is evident in his last two books of philosophy: On Sobriety (2020) and On Prudence (2024).

Ismaël Diadié Haïdara's contribution to poetry is the reinvention of a new poetic genre, the Tebrae. Tebrae is a poetic form of two lines of 6 and 8 lines, shorter than the Haikus of Japan. The women of the Sahara composed these short poems on a single theme: love. They meet at night, on the dunes, and compose these poems for their loved ones, which end up circulating unsigned. Ismaël, far from his homeland, returns to this feminine poetry, while he, a man, turns to writing. Rhyming poetry, he turns it into free verse, shifting its central theme to open it up to all the possible subjects of the world, love and death. From poem to poem, an art of living is distilled into two lines. Faced with the absurd, Camus made revolt his duty. Ismaël turns his back on the absurd with a burst of laughter. The Spanish poet Virginia Fernandez Collado said in her article: Tebrae, cartographie d'un livre :

"If the five-line tanka have their poet in Takuboku, the four-line quatrains their great creator in Khayyam and the three-line haikus their most representative poet in Bashô, we can say without exaggeration that the tebrae, the shortest two-line poems to date, have their innovator in Ismaël, for he gives us a new genre of short poetry whose roots are the songs of the African women of the Sahara... The philosophy found in his Tebrae is one of daily enjoyment, because, as he shows, we don't know what will happen tomorrow, and in the long term everyone will end up in a graveyard, so we have to live in the moment and enjoy the little pleasures that life offers us despite the suffering it brings. He shows us that we have to live in the moment by laughing. The character that runs through the book is a wanderer with no strings attached, a free being, sometimes tormented, sometimes amused. Sweeping up dead leaves in passing gardens, he has no worries".

The Indian poet Sudeep Sen, author of Anthropocene (winner of the Rabindranath Tagore literary prize), poetry editor and international writer for Ars Notoria, says of Tebrae:

"ISMAËL DIADIÉ HAÏDARA's poems may speak of exile, but not in the predictable way that only evokes loss and sadness. He writes: ‘Exile is not sad / Far from home, here there is love, snow, sea’. Tebrae is an aggregation of thoughts, episodes and feelings presented in two-line fragments in the form of couplets: they are epigrammatic, melancholic and wise, even unsentimental: ‘One day, grass will grow on my grave, but don't cry, / Floating cloud, I laughed at everything’. But, in the end and unsurprisingly, he is a romantic at heart: ‘Story of my life: / War, famine, epidemic and now the madness of love’. It is positivity that ultimately underpins this series of poems, and we, as readers, are grateful to him for it".

In history, Ismaël Diadié Haïdara's contribution was, on the one hand, to discover the political, economic and cultural relations between al-Andalus and sub-Saharan Africa in several articles and his book L'Espagne musulmane et l'Afrique subsaharienne (1997), and, on the other hand, the discovery of the manuscripts of Jewish traders in his book Les Juifs à Timbuktu (1999).

== Poetry ==
1. Territoire de la Douleur, Bamako, IPN, 1977.

2. Comme une blessure éclatée dans les vannes du soleil, Bamako, IPN, 1978.

3. Le Chant équinoxial, Bamako, IPN, 1979.

4. Le tombeau de Jabès, in Saluer Jabès, les suites du livre, édité par Didier Cahen, en collaboration avec : Paul Auster, José AngelValente, Yves Bonnefoy, Jacques Derrida, Michel Camus, Kazunari Suzumura …

5. Las lamentaciones del viejo Tombo, Maremoto, Málaga, 2006.

5. Une cabane au bord de l’eau, 2015.

6. Mi edad de piedra, in Irreconciliable, Málaga 2016.

7. Palabras sin Fronteras, en colaboración con Haydar Ergülen, Ayuntamiento de Baza, 2016.

8. Tebrae para mi madre, 2017.

9. Sahel, 2017.

10. Tebrae, Libros del Aire, Cantábria, 2021

== Philosophy ==
1. Le statut du monde : Nécessité, Possibilité et Contingence chez Ibn Arabi de Murcie, Cordoue, Lamalif, 1992.

2 Monologo de un carnero, Arbol de Poe, Málaga 2012.

3. Zimma, Vaso Roto, Mexico, 2014.

4. De la sobriedad, Almuzara, 2020.

5. Sabidurias de Tombuctú, Almuzara, Cordoba, 2024.

6. De la prudencia, Almuzara, 2024

== History ==
1. Las relaciones subsaharianas de al-Andalus durante el siglo X, Cordoba, Lamalif, 1989.

2. Les années de Cuevas del Almanzora dans la vie de Jawdar Pacha, Barcelona, Studia Africana, 1991.

3. La conquête du Songhay les questions logistiques, Le Maroc et l’Afrique Subsaharienne aux débuts des temps modernes, Les Sa`diens et l’Empire Songhay, Actes du Colloque International organisé par l’Institut des Etudes Africaines, Marrakech, 23-25 Octobre 1992, pp. 89-118.

4. En collaboration avec Reynaldo Manzano et Azucena Manzano) Introduction à la tradition musicale des Arma de la Boucle du Niger, in Le Maroc et l’Afrique Subsaharienne aux débuts des temps modernes, Les Sa`diens et l’Empire Songhay, Actes du Colloque International organisé par l’Institut des Etudes Africaines, Marrakech, 23-25 Octobre 1992, pp. 325-361.

5. Du nouveau sur la fin du Pachalick Arma de Tombouctou : une lettre de Cheick Sidi el-Mukhtar à Ahmad Lobbo du Macina, Institut des Études Africaines, Rabat, 1992.

6. Les Morisques en Afrique Subsaharienne, essai d’évaluation quantitative, Le Ve centenaire de la chute de Grenade 1492-1992, Actes du Ve symposium International d’études morisques, CEROMDI, Zaghouan, Février 1993, T. I, pp. 341-351.

7. El Bajá Yawdar y la conquista Saadí del Songhay (1591-1599), Instituto de Estudios Almerienses/Ayuntamiento de Cuevas del Almanzora, 1993.

8. Le Pasha Jawdar et la conquête Saadienne du Songhay (1591-1599), Institut des Études Africaines, Rabat, 1996.

9. La famille Kati, Barcelona, Studia Africana, nº 7, 1996.

10. Histoire des Juifs à Tombouctou: La Synagogue, le marché et le Cimetière, Tapama, nº 1, Bamako, 1996.

11. Les Routes de la lyre : Tombouctou et les poètes de l’exil andalous, in La Culture arabo-islamique en Afrique au Sud du Sahara : Cas de l’Afrique de l’Ouest, Acte du Colloque International tenu à Tombouctou, CEROMDI, Zaghouan, 1997.

12. L’Espagne musulmane et l’or de l’Afrique subsaharienne, Tapama, nº2, Bamako, 1997.

13. L’Espagne musulmane dans les relations Subsahariennes, Bamako, Éditions Donniya, 1999.

14. Essai sur la littérature andalouse au Soudan d’après le Ta`rîkh al-Sûdân d’Abd al-Ramân al-Sa´dî, Revue d’Anthropologie de Paris, 1999.

15. Les juifs à Tombouctou, Éditions Donniya, 1999.

16. Los últimos Visigodos, Editores, Sevilla, 2003.

17. Los otros españoles, en colaboración con Manuel Pimentel, Ediciones mr. Madrid, 2004.

18. Rihla de Abana, Fundacion Mahmud Kati & editorial Almuzara, Cordoue 2006.

19. Les Trésors caché de Tombouctou, Répertoire Général des manuscrits de Fondo Kati. La Famille de al-Quti, Qom, 2012.

20. Tombuctú, Andalusíes en la ciudad perdida del Sahara, en colaboración con Manuel Pimentel, Almazara 2015.

21. Diario de un bibliotecario de Tombuctú, Almuzara, 2017.

22. De Toledo a Tombuctú, GINGER APE BOOK FILMS, 2018

23. De Toledo a Tombuctú (con Antonio Llaguno Rojas), GINGER APE BOOK FILMS, 2018.

254 Tombuctú y los heterodoxos españoles I. Yawdar Pasha y la conquista Saudí de Tombuctú, Amazón, 2020.

25. Tombuctú y los heterodoxos españoles II. Los Sefardíes. Amazón, 2020.

26. Las relaciones entre Al-Andalus y África subsahariana del siglo X al siglo XIX. CUADRO CRONOLÓGICO. IN Marruecos y el Legado andalusi en el Sudan occidental, Coloqui Internacional, Académie du Royaume du Maroc, Rabat, 2022.

27. Fondo Kati, in Letra Internacional, El espacio infinito, Bibliofilias, Fundación Pablo Iglesias, Granada, 2024.

28. El Fondo Kati, in Manuscritos del Fondo Kati. Investigación y Análisis, PHC, Junta de Andalucía, nº 35.

== Films ==
Fondo Kati, testigo del exilio andalu, Hilvan creaciones, 2004.

La caravana de los manuscritos de Al Ándalus, Lidia Peralta Gracía, 2997.

Ismael, el último guadian, Pedrero Miriem, El Sotano, 2017.

Sanchéz Drago: https://www.youtube.com/watch?v=V-dIFJwVR7g
