= Gideon Behar =

Israeli diplomat and activist (born 1964)

- גדעון בכר
- Born: March 5, 1964 (age 62)

Gideon Behar (Hebrew: גדעון בכר; born March 5, 1964) is an Israeli diplomat and environmental activist. He currently serves as Israel's ambassador to Kenya.

== Biography ==
Behar was born in Jerusalem, the fourth of five children. His father was a pharmacist in Clalit Health Services and his mother was a homemaker. In an interview, he stated that protecting animals and nature was very important to him from childhood.

He studied at Hebrew University Secondary School in Jerusalem, majoring in Arabic and Middle Eastern studies.

Behar holds a bachelor's degree in Middle Eastern studies and Islam (1991), and a master's degree in Islamic studies from the Hebrew University of Jerusalem (1995).

== Career ==
Behar joined the Israeli Ministry of Foreign Affairs in 1994.

Between 1996 and 2000, he served as deputy head of Israel's diplomatic mission in Tunisia. Between 2000 and 2002, he served as political adviser at the Israeli Embassy in Berlin. Between 2002 and 2006, he was deputy director of the Jordan, Syria, and Lebanon Department.

In 2006, he was appointed Ambassador of Israel to Senegal. He also served as non-resident ambassador to Cape Verde, Guinea, Guinea-Bissau, Sierra Leone, and The Gambia. He served in this role until 2011. As ambassador, he focused on transferring expertise in irrigation and sustainable agriculture, and led the establishment of numerous initiatives for farmers in the region.

Between 2011 and 2017, he headed the Department for Combating Antisemitism and Holocaust Remembrance at the Ministry of Foreign Affairs. In this capacity, he led efforts for the adoption of the IHRA definition of antisemitism, which was later adopted by countries around the world and considered a significant Israeli achievement in combating antisemitism.

Between 2017 and 2020, he served as head of the Africa Division at the Ministry of Foreign Affairs.

Between 2020 and 2025, he served as Special Envoy for Climate Change and Sustainability at the Ministry of Foreign Affairs. In this role, he promoted climate innovation in the Middle East and around the world. He also lectured on the implications of climate change for international relations at IDC Herzliya.

In 2025, he was appointed resident ambassador to Kenya and non-resident ambassador to Malawi, Tanzania, Uganda, and Seychelles. Behar also serves as permanent representative to the United Nations Environment Programme and UN-Habitat, both headquartered in Nairobi.

=== Personal life ===
Behar is married and has four children. He lives in Modi'in.

Behar is an environmental activist in the non-governmental organization "Residents Influencing Modi'in", which works to protect nature and open spaces in Modi'in and prepare the city for the climate crisis. He serves as chairman of the organization.

Behar speaks seven languages: Hebrew, English, French, German, Dutch, Arabic, and Wolof (which he learned while serving as ambassador to Senegal). Upon assuming his post as ambassador to Kenya, he began studying Swahili.

== Honors ==
Senegalese President Abdoulaye Wade awarded him the decoration "Grand Officer of the National Order of the Lion" in recognition of his unique contribution to Senegal.

He received a special award from CONGAD, the umbrella organization of non-governmental organizations in Senegal, for his humanitarian activities in the country.

In 2015, he and his team received the "Outstanding Team of the Year" award from the Israeli Ministry of Foreign Affairs for organizing and managing the Global Forum for Combating Antisemitism.
