= History of the Jews in Africa =

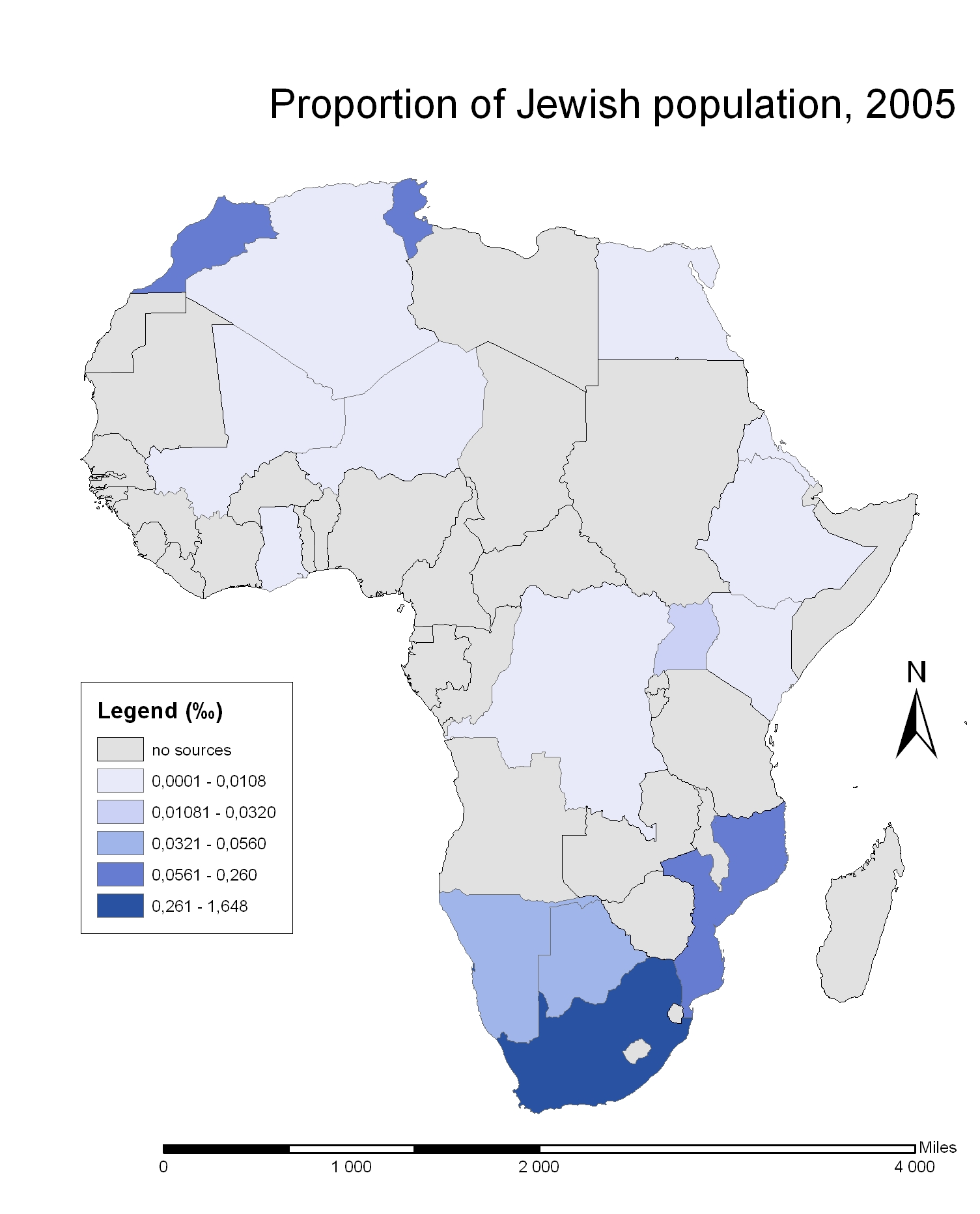
Proportion of Jewish population in Africa

Jewish communities of Continental Africa include:

- Maghrebi Jews, Sephardic Jews and Mizrahi Jews who predominantly live in the Maghreb of North Africa, including Moroccan Jews, Algerian Jews, Tunisian Jews, and Libyan Jews. Historically, smaller Sephardic communities also lived in Egypt. Some of them were established in North Africa before the Roman period; other communities were established after the expulsion of Jews from Iberia in the late 15th century.
- Berber Jews, the majority of whom were assimilated and converted to Islam, especially during the historical persecutions of the Almohadic Caliphate in the Middle Ages. The modern population of Berber Jews now numbers about 8,000 people in Morocco, many of whom have emigrated to Israel since the establishment of the State of Israel, along with smaller numbers throughout Europe and the Americas.
- South African Jews (mostly Ashkenazi Jews, descended from pre-Holocaust immigrant Lithuanian Jews) and Lemba Jews in Southern Africa.
- Beta Israel who live in the Amhara and Tigray regions of Ethiopia and sparsely live in Eritrea.
- Such historical communities which no longer exist in sub-Saharan Africa (due to assimilation) such as the Jews of Bilad el-Sudan in West Africa, who practiced Judaism prior to the introduction of Islam in the 14th century.

== Ancient communities ==
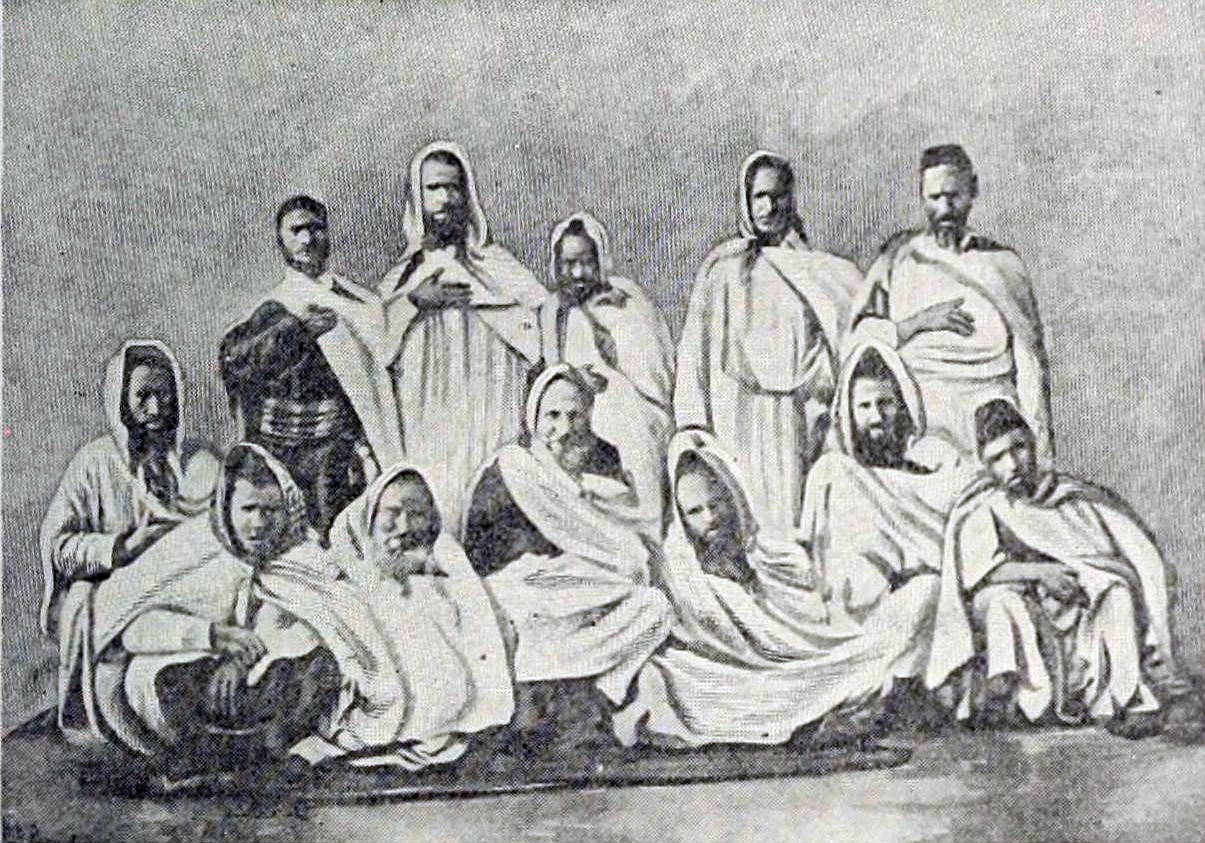
Berber Jews of the Atlas Mountains, c. 1900

The most ancient communities of African Jews are the Ethiopian, West African, Sephardi, and Mizrahi Jews of North Africa and the Horn of Africa.

In the seventh century, many Spanish Jews fled from the persecution which was occurring under the rule of the Visigoths and migrated to North Africa, where they made their homes in the Byzantine-dominated cities along the Mediterranean coast. Others arrived after the expulsion from Iberia. Remnants of longstanding Jewish communities remain in Morocco, Tunisia, and the Spanish cities of Ceuta and Melilla. There is a much-diminished but still vibrant community on the island of Djerba in Tunisia. Since 1948 and the war to establish Israel, which aroused hostility in Muslim lands, most other North African Jews emigrated to Israel.

Of the seventh-century immigrants, some of them moved inland and proselytized among the Berber tribes. A number of tribes, including the Jarawa, Uled Jari, and some tribes of the Daggatun people, converted to Judaism. Ibn Khaldun reported that Kahina, a female Berber warlord who led the resistance against the Muslim Arab conquests of North Africa in the 680s and 690s, was a Jew of the Jarawa tribe. With the defeat of the Berber rebellion, none of the Jewish communities was initially forced to convert to Islam.

=== Ethiopia ===
In 1975, the Israeli religious authorities and the Israeli government both recognized the Beta Israel of Ethiopia as an officially Jewish community. Hundreds of persons who wanted to emigrate to Israel were air-lifted under the leadership of Prime Minister Menachem Begin. Begin had obtained an official ruling from the Israeli Sephardi Chief Rabbi (or Rishon LeZion) Ovadia Yosef that the Beta Israel were descendants of the Ten Lost Tribes. Rabbis believed that they were probably descendants of the Tribe of Dan; rabbinical responsa discussing issues related to the people date back hundreds of years. With this endorsement, in later decades, tens of thousands of Beta Israel Jews were air-lifted to Israel. Significant immigration to Israel continues into the 21st century, producing an Ethiopian Jewish community of around 81,000 immigrants, who with their 39,000 children who were born in Israel itself, numbered around 120,000 by early 2009.

Due to certain aspects of Orthodox Jewish marital laws, Rabbi Yosef ruled that upon their arrival in Israel, the Beta Israel had to undergo a pro forma conversion to Judaism. They had to declare their allegiance to a halachic way of life and the Jewish people, in conformity with practices which are followed by adherents of Orthodox Rabbinical Judaism. He did not demand the normal formal requirements that the halacha imposes on potential gentile proselytes, (such as a brit milah or immersion in a mikveh). Few Ashkenazi rabbinic authorities consider the conversions to be actual conversions, not pro forma.

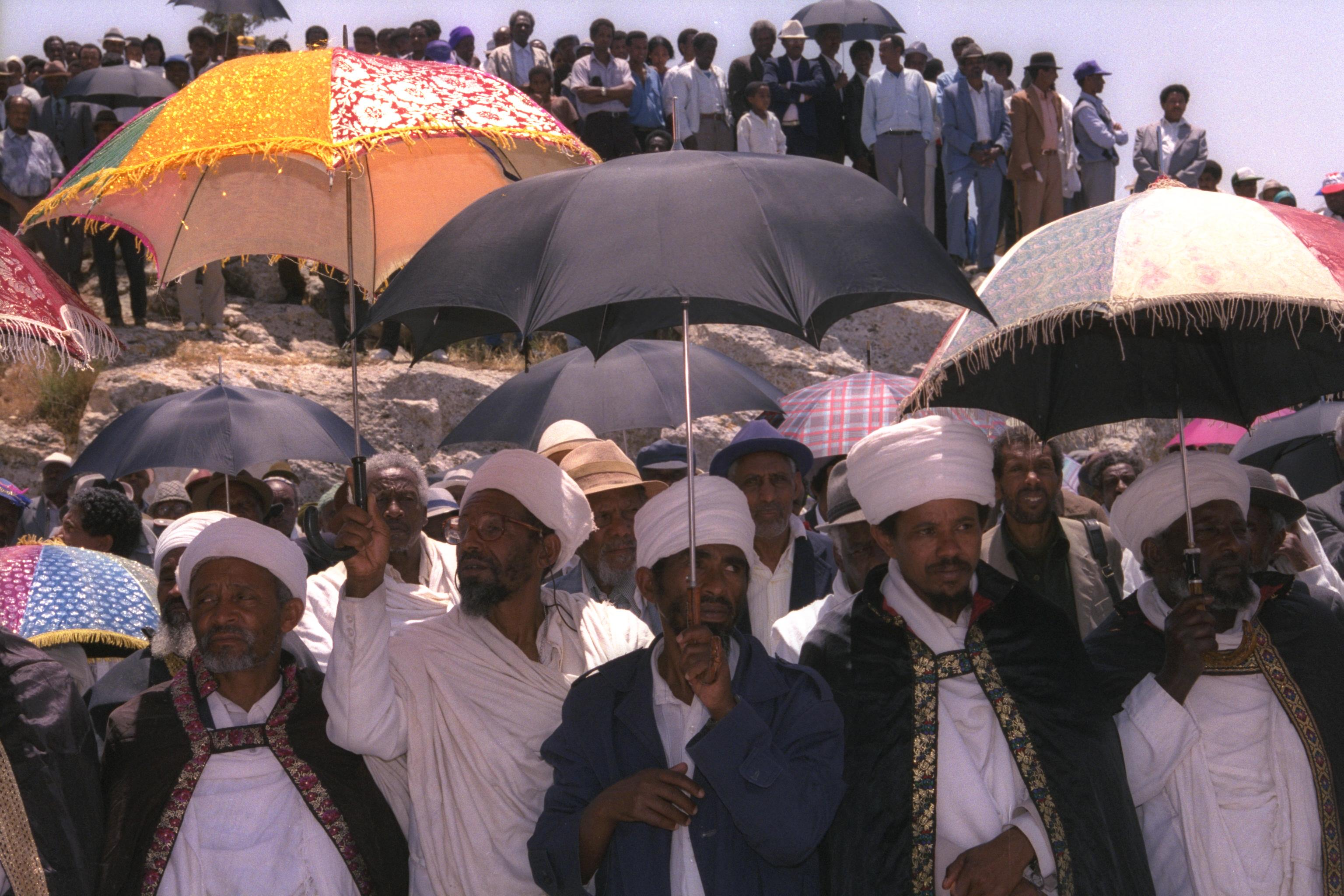
Ethiopian Jews

Over time, due to their community's isolation from those in Europe and the Middle East, the practices of the Beta Israel developed to differ significantly from those of other forms of Judaism. In Ethiopia, the Beta Israel community was for the most part isolated from the Talmud. They did have their own oral law. In some cases, they had practices similar to those of Karaite Judaism, and in others more similar to rabbinical Judaism.

In many instances, their religious elders, or their priestly class, known as kessim or qessotch, interpreted the Biblical Law of the Tanakh in a way which is similar to the way in which it is interpreted by rabbinite Jewish communities in other parts of the world. In that sense, the Beta Israel had a tradition analogous to that of the Talmud, although at times at variance with the practices and teachings of other Jewish communities.

One significant difference is the fact that the Beta Israel lacked the festivals of Purim and Hanukkah, probably because they branched off from the main body of Judaism before these non-Biblical holidays began to be commemorated. Today, most members of the Beta Israel community living in Israel do observe these holidays.

They are a community which is in transition. Some of the kessim accept the rabbinic/Talmudic tradition that is practiced by non-Ethiopian Orthodox Jews. Many members of the younger generation of Ethiopian-Israelis have been educated in yeshivas and they have also received rabbinical ordination (semikha). A certain segment of traditionalist kessim insist on maintaining their separate and distinct form of Judaism, as it had been practiced in Ethiopia and Eritrea. Many of the Ethiopian Jewish youth who have immigrated to Israel or been born there have assimilated either to the dominant form of Orthodox Judaism, or to a secular lifestyle.

The Beit Avraham of Ethiopia consists of some 50,000 members. This community also claims to have a Jewish heritage. Several scholars think that they broke off from the Beta Israel community several centuries ago, hid their Jewish customs, and outwardly adopted Ethiopian Orthodox Christianity.

The Beit Avraham have traditionally been on the lower rungs of Ethiopian social life. They have held occupations which are similar to those which have been held by the Beta Israel, such as crafts. Recently, the Beit Avraham community has attempted to reach out to the worldwide Jewish community. They formed the Ethiopian North Shewa Zionist Organization in an attempt to save their Jewish identity. The members of this group refer to themselves as the Falashmura. Because they do not have any reliable proof of Jewish ancestry, Israeli religious authorities and other religious Jewish communities require them to complete a formal conversion to Judaism before they recognize them as Jews. Those Falashmura who do so are considered converts to Judaism.

The Gefat people (locally known by the pejorative "Fuga") are a southern Ethiopian tribe which is descended from Beta Israel.

=== Somalia ===
The Yibir are a tribe that lives in Somalia, eastern Ethiopia, Djibouti, and northern Kenya. Though they have been Muslim for centuries, some of them assert they are descendants of Hebrews who arrived in the Horn of Africa long before the arrival of Somali nomads. These individuals assert that Yibir means "Hebrew" in their language.

=== Bilad el-Sudan ===
The historical presence of Jewish communities in Africa is well-attested to. Today, the descendants of these Jews live in nations such as Sierra Leone, Liberia, Senegal, Ghana, Nigeria, and many other areas. According to the 17th century Tarikh al-Fattash and the Tarikh al-Sudan, several Jewish communities existed as parts of the Ghana, Mali, and later Songhai empires. One such community was formed by a group of Egyptian Jews, who allegedly traveled by way of the Sahel corridor through Chad into Mali. Manuscript C of the Tarikh al-Fattash described a community called the Bani Israel; in 1402, it lived in Tindirma, possessed 333 wells, and had seven princes as well as an army.

Another such community was that of the Zuwa ruler of Koukiya (located at the Niger River). His name was known only as Zuwa Alyaman, meaning "He comes from Yemen". According to an isolated local legend, Zuwa Alyaman was a member of one of the Jewish communities transported from Yemen by Abyssinians in the 6th century CE after the defeat of Dhu Nuwas. Zuwa Alyaman was said to have traveled into West Africa along with his brother. They established a community in Kukiya at the banks of the Niger River downstream from Gao. According to the Tarikh al-Sudan, after Zuwa Alyaman, there were 14 Zuwa rulers of Gao before the rise of Islam in the second half of the eleventh century.

Other sources stated that other Jewish communities in the region developed from people who migrated from Morocco and Egypt; others later came from Portugal. Some communities were said to have been populated by certain Berber Jews, like a group of Tuareg known as Dawsahak or Iddao Ishaak ("children of Isaac"). They speak a language related to Songhai, live in Ménaka Region in northeastern Mali and were formerly herders for Tuareg nobles. In addition, some migrated into the area away from the Muslim rule of North Africa.

The well-known 16th Century geographer Leo Africanus - an Andalusian Berber convert to Christianity - mentions a mysterious small village of African Jews southwest of Timbuktu, who traded in exotic spices, weapons, and poisons.

== Medieval arrivals ==
=== North Africa and the Maghreb ===
The largest influx of Jews to Africa came after the Spanish Inquisition after the Fall of Granada and the end of Islamic Spain. The mass exodus and expulsion of the Iberian Jews began in 1492, Sicilian Jews were affected soon afterwards. Many of these Sephardi Jews settled primarily in the Maghreb under Muslim and Ottoman patronage. Morocco, Tunisia, Libya and Algeria as well as Egypt became home to significant Jewish communities. These communities were later incorporated into the Ottoman millet system as Africanized Ottoman Jews, bound by the laws of the Talmud and Torah but with allegiance to the Caliph of Constantinople.

=== Tanzania ===
The Nyambo are a tribe that lives in Tanzania, northern Tanzania, and Southern Uganda as Ankole. Though they have been Christians for centuries, they assert they are descendants of Hebrews who arrived in the Horn of Africa long before the arrival of Somali nomads. Some say that Nyambo means "Hebrew" in their language.

=== Sudan ===
We know little about the history of the presence of Jews in the territories of today's Sudan in modern times, and based on what we know about it, in the 19th and 20th centuries, a permanent Jewish community was founded, and it totaled approximately one thousand Jews at its peak, and during the 1970s, that Jewish community was isolated from other Jewish communities.

=== Songhai ===
In the 14th century many Moors and Jews, fleeing persecution in Spain, migrated south to the Timbuktu area, at that time part of the Songhai Empire. Among them was the Kehath (Ka'ti) family, descended from Ismael Jan Kot Al-yahudi of Scheida, Morocco. Sons of this prominent family founded three villages that still exist near Timbuktu—Kirshamba, Haybomo, and Kongougara. In 1492, Askia Muhammed came to power in the previously tolerant region of Timbuktu and decreed that Jews must convert to Islam or leave; Judaism became illegal in Songhai, as it did in Catholic Spain that same year. As the historian Leo Africanus wrote in 1526: "The king (Askia) is a declared enemy of the Jews. He will not allow any to live in the city. If he hears it said that a Berber merchant frequents them or does business with them, he confiscates his goods."

The Kehath family converted with the rest of the non-Muslim population. The Cohens, descended from the Moroccan Islamicized Jewish trader El-Hadj Abd-al-Salam al Kuhin, arrived in the Timbuktu area in the 18th century, and the Abana family came in the first half of the 19th century. According to Prof. Michel Abitbol, at the Center for the Research of Moroccan Jewry in Israel, in the late 19th century Rabbi Mardoche Aby Serour traveled to Timbuktu several times as a not-too-successful trader in ostrich feathers and ivory. Ismael Diadie Haidara, a historian from Timbuktu, has found old Hebrew texts among the city's historical records. He has also researched his own past and discovered that he is descended from the Moroccan Jewish traders of the Abana family. As he interviewed elders in the villages of his relatives, he has discovered that knowledge of the family's Jewish identity has been preserved, in secret, out of fear of persecution.

=== São Tomé e Príncipe ===
King Manuel I of Portugal exiled about 2,000 Jewish children under the age of ten, to São Tomé and Príncipe around 1500. Most died, but in the early 17th century "the local bishop noted with disgust that there were still Jewish observances on the island and returned to Portugal because of his frustration with them." Although Jewish practices faded over subsequent centuries, there are people in São Tomé and Príncipe who are aware of partial descent from this population. Similarly, a number of Portuguese ethnic Jews were exiled to Sao Tome after forced conversions to Roman Catholicism. From São Tomé and by other means groups of Jews settled down the west coast of Africa, as far south as Loango.

== Modern communities ==
=== Cameroon ===
Rabbi Yisrael Oriel, formerly Bodol Ngimbus-Ngimbus, was born into the Bassa people. He says there were historically Jews in the area and that the word "Bassa" is from the Hebrew for 'on a journey' and means "blessing". Rabbi Oriel claims to be a Levite descended from Moses and reportedly made aliya in 1988, and he was then apparently ordained as a rabbi by the Sephardic Chief Rabbi and appointed rabbi to Nigerian Jews.

Rabbi Oriel claims that in 1920 there were 400,000 'Israelites' in Cameroon, but by 1962 the number had decreased to 167,000 due to conversions to Christianity and Islam. He said that although these tribes had not been accepted halachically, he believes that he can prove their Jewish status from medieval rabbinic sources.

The father of Yaphet Kotto, an American actor, was a Cameroonian Jew. Kotto identified as Jewish.

=== Côte d'Ivoire ===
Communities have been forming in Côte d'Ivoire in recent years and have been slowly growing throughout the region. The capital city of Abidjan has two synagogues, each with a population of about 40-70 congregants. In addition, large groups of indigenous peoples referred to as Danites claim descent from the lost tribe of Dan and many from this ethnic group have shown interest in Judaic practices.

=== Ghana ===
From the eighteenth century on what is now Ghana was a favorite locus for theories positing Israelite origins for various ethnic groups in the area. These theories were widespread and were taken up by powerful people in the twentieth century. The House of Israel community of Sefwi Wiawso, Sefwi Sui has identified as Jewish since the early 1970s.

=== Kenya ===
Theories suggesting Israelite origins particularly of the Masai abounded in the nineteenth century and were gradually absorbed into religious and societal practices throughout the area. The chief proponent of Masai Israelite origins was a German officer Moritz Merkel whose detailed research is still in use today. Of the many Judaic manifestations in the religious sphere is a small emergent community in Laikipia County, Kenya, which has abandoned Christianity and taken up Judaism. There are an estimated 5,000 of them at the present time. Although at first Messianic, they concluded that their beliefs were incompatible with Christianity and are now waiting to be instructed in traditional Judaism. Some of the younger children of this community have been sent to the Abayudaya schools in Uganda to be instructed in Judaism and other subjects. Luos in Kenya are another of the groups considered by some to be of Israelite origin. They claim to have migrated hundreds of years ago from the north along the river Nile from Egypt through South Sudan and then into Kenya.

=== Madagascar ===
In early modern times it was widely believed that Israelites had settled in Madagascar. Works by the French scholar Alfred Grandidier and Augustus Keane, the British professor of Hindustani at University College, London provided what they saw as conclusive proof of these ancient connections. In 2010 a small community of Malagasies began practicing normative Judaism, and three separate communities formed, each embracing a different version of Jewish spiritual practice. In May 2016, 121 members of the Malagasy Jewish community were converted in accordance with traditional Jewish rituals; appearing before a beit din and submerged in a mikvah. The conversion, organized with the help of the Jewish organization Kulanu, was presided over by three Orthodox rabbis.

=== Nigeria ===
At the present time, the existence of Israelite associations is mainly attributed to the Igbo, some of whom claim Israelite origins. Most of the Jews of Nigeria can be found among the Igbo ethnic group. Certain Nigerian communities with Judaic practices have been receiving help from individual Israelis and American Jews who work in Nigeria with outreach organizations like Kulanu. The number of Igbos in Nigeria who identify as Jews has been estimated to number around 4,000 (2016), along with 70 synagogues. Many have converted from Christianity. Other sources give a higher estimate, claiming that some 30,000 Igbos were practicing some form of Judaism in 2008.

=== Uganda ===
For centuries, it was believed that Jews inhabited the central portions of Africa. Some Africans were keen to adopt Judaism in recent times. One of these was Samei Kakungulu, one of the most remarkable Ugandans of his generation, a brilliant military strategist and a man who had a great amount of spiritual and intellectual curiosity. In 1919, having declared that "we now will be known as Jews," he was circumcised along with his first son, whom he called Yuda. His second son was subsequently circumcised on the eighth day, in the Jewish fashion, and he was named Nimrod. In 1922, Kakungulu published a 90-page book, which was essentially a guide to Judaism. He died a Jew (albeit one with a residual belief in Jesus) and his followers in Mbale, who are known as the Abayudaya, continued to practice Judaism, despite the persecution which they were subjected to during the rule of Idi Amin, when many of them converted to Christianity or Islam, and today, they are some thousand strong. In the twenty first century, the Abayudaya are considered observant practitioners of Judaism, many of them have undergone formal Orthodox conversions, and they have forged strong links with Jewish communities in the United States and Israel, along with increasingly strong links with Black Jewish communities in Africa and elsewhere. In a relatively new movement, the Abayudaya of Uganda have converted to Judaism since 1917, influenced by the American William Saunders Crowdy, who claimed that African Americans were descended from the Jews.

=== Zambia ===
A number of European Jews settled in Northern Rhodesia (now Zambia). At its peak in the early 1960s, there were 1,000 Jews living in the country, many in Livingstone. The number began to fall after independence and there were estimated to be around 50 remaining by 2012.

=== Zimbabwe ===
==== Anglo-Jews ====
The Zimbabwe Jewish community was mainly of British citizenship, whose arrival coincides with the first white colonists in the 1890s. At its peak in the early 1970s, it numbered some 7500 people (80% Ashkenazi Jews) who lived primarily in the two communities of Salisbury (now Harare) and Bulawayo in Matabeleland. Smaller rural communities also existed for short periods in Kwekwe, Umtali (now Mutare), and Gatooma. The community declined in part due to age, but most Jewish residents in Zimbabwe left after violence and social disruption. In 2007, the local Jewish community had declined to 270. The community had strong links with Israel.

In 2003, the Bulawayo Hebrew Congregation Synagogue burned down; this was followed by several letters justifying the fire based on economic antisemitism.

==== The Lemba People ====
The Lemba,"wa-Remba", or "Mwenye" are a Bantu-speaking ethnic group which is native to Zimbabwe and South Africa, with smaller, little-known branches in Mozambique and Malawi. According to Tudor Parfitt, when he first worked in the field among the Lemba in South Africa, Zimbabwe and Malawi in the 1980s, they numbered an estimated 50,000. They speak the same Bantu languages which their geographic neighbors speak and they also bear a physical resemblance to their geographic neighbors, but some of their religious practices and beliefs are similar to Jewish and Muslim practices and beliefs. According to Parfitt, the Lemba claim that they once had a book which described their traditions but it was lost.

Parfitt has suggested that the name "Lemba" may be derived from chilemba, a Swahili word for the turbans which are worn by some Bantu men, or it may be derived from lembi, a Bantu term for a "non-African" or a "respected foreigner". In Zimbabwe and South Africa, the people prefer the name Mwenye.

They adhere to a tradition in which they claim ancient Jewish or South Arabian descent through their male line. Genetic Y-DNA analyses in the 2000s have established a partially Middle-Eastern origin for a portion of the male Lemba population. More recent research argues that DNA studies do not support claims of a specifically Jewish genetic heritage.

=== Mauritius ===
According to the 2011 census carried out by Statistics Mauritius, there are 43 Jews in Mauritius.

== See also ==
=== Regions: ===
- History of the Jews in Central Africa
- History of the Jews in East Africa
- History of the Jews in North Africa
- History of the Jews in Southern Africa
- History of the Jews in West Africa

=== Topics: ===
- African American–Jewish relations
- African-American Jews
- African diaspora religions
- Antisemitism by country#Africa
- Antisemitism in the Arab world
- Antisemitism in Islam
- Black Hebrew Israelites
- Black Judaism
- Black nationalism#Black nationalism and antisemitism
- Expulsions and exoduses of Jews
- History of antisemitism
- History of the Jews under Muslim rule
- Islamic–Jewish relations
- Jewish diaspora
- Jewish ethnic divisions
- Jewish exodus from the Muslim world
- Jewish history
- Jewish population by country
- Jewish religious movements
- Jewish schisms
- Jewish views on religious pluralism
- Jews of color
- List of Jews from Sub-Saharan Africa
- Madagascar Plan
- Nation of Islam and antisemitism
- Persecution of Jews
- Racism in Africa
- Racism in the Arab world
- Racism in Israel#Intra-Jewish racism
- Racism in Jewish communities#Jews of color
- Racism in Muslim communities
- Religion in Africa#Judaism
- Uganda Scheme
- Xenophobia and racism in the Middle East
