= Adiembra =

- Village
- Location in Ghana
- Coordinates: 6°15′0″N 2°14′0″W
- Country: Ghana
- Region: Western North Region
- District: Bibiani-Anhwiaso-Bekwai Municipal District
- Time zone: GMT
  - Summer (DST): GMT

Adiembra is a village in the Western North Region of Ghana.

== History ==
Adiembra was historically home to a Jewish community from the House of Israel. The House of Israel were not accepted by the Christians of Adiembra, who violently persecuted them and imprisoned their leaders. Most of the House of Israel fled Adiembra and settled in nearby Sefwi Wiawso, establishing the neighborhood of New Adiembra.

Adiembra is home to the non-profit environmentalist organization Friends of the Nation.

== See also ==
- History of the Jews in Ghana
