= Daggatun =

Jewish nomadic tribe in Algeria

Daggatun was a nomad tribe of Jewish origin living in the neighborhood of Tamentit, in the oasis of Tuat in the Algerian Sahara.

== History ==
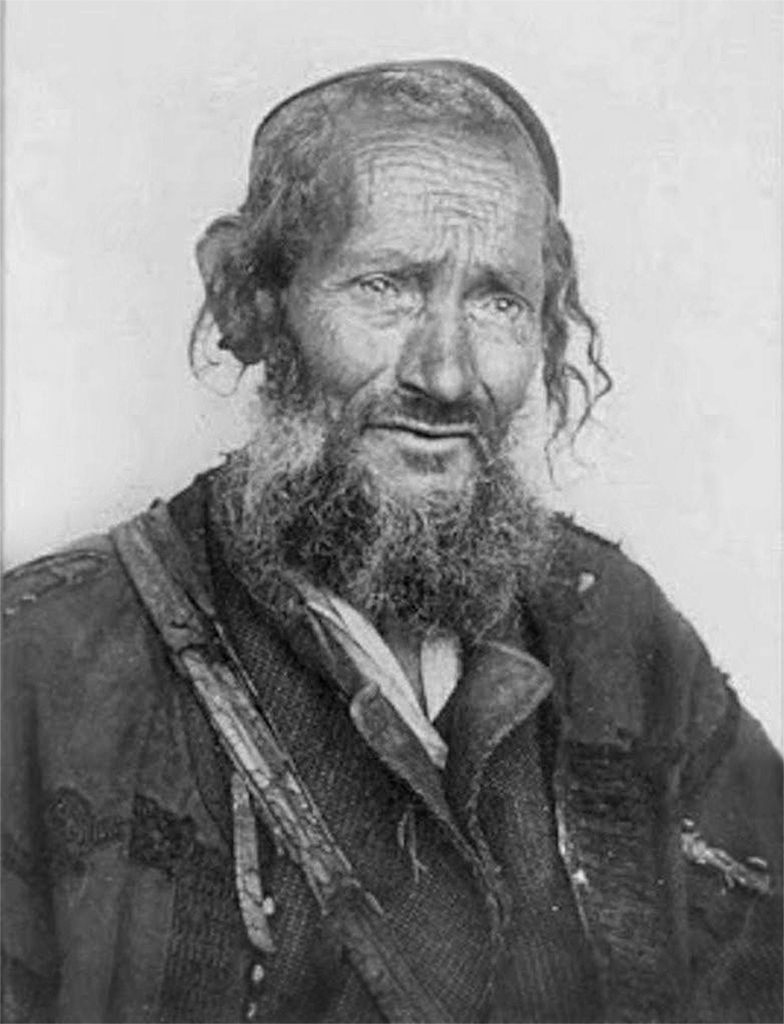
Rabbi Mordechai Aby Serour circa 1870s - 1880s. Last Rabbi of Timbuktu.

An account of the Daggatun (whose name may perhaps be derived from the Arabic "tughatun," meaning infidels) was first given by Rabbi Mordechai Abi Serur of Akka (Morocco), who in 1857 journeyed through the Sahara to Timbuktu, and whose account of his travels was published in the Bulletin de la Société de Géographie.

According to Rabbi Mordecai, the Daggatun live in tents and resemble the Tuareg people, among whom they live, in language, religion, and general customs. They are fairer in complexion than the generality of African Jews, and are still conscious of their origin. They are subject to the Tuaregs, who do not intermarry with them. Mordecai is the authority for the statement that their settlement in the Sahara dates from the end of the seventh century, when Abd al-Malik ibn Marwan ascended the throne and pushed his conquests as far as Morocco. At Tamentit, he tried to convert the inhabitants to Islam; and as the Jews offered great resistance he exiled them to the desert of Ajaj, as he did also the Tuaregs, who had only partially accepted Islam. Cut off from any connection with their brethren, these Jews in the Sahara gradually lost their Jewish practises and became nominally Muslims.

These statements of R. Mordecai evidently rest upon some foundation. The Arabs driven to Ajaj are to be identified with the Mechagra mentioned by Erwin de Bary ("Ghat et les Tuareg de l'Ain," p. 181), among whom a few Jews are said still to dwell. V. J. Horowitz ("Morokko," p. 58, Leipsic 1887) also speaks of many free tribes in the desert regions who are Jews by race, but who have gradually thrown off Jewish customs and have apparently accepted Islam. Among these tribes, Horowitz says, are the Daggatun, numbering several thousands and scattered over several oases in the Sahara, even as far as the River Dialiva or Niger. Horowitz says that they are very warlike and in constant conflict with the Tuaregs. According to Horowitz, the Mechagra mentioned above are also to be reckoned as one of these Jewish tribes.

== See also ==
- African Jews
- Jews and Judaism in Africa
- Jews of Bilad el-Sudan
- History of the Jews in Algeria
- History of the Jews in Tunisia
- History of the Jews in Morocco

== Bibliography ==
- Rabbi Isidore Loeb, Les Daggatouns, Paris, 1880:
- H. S. Morais, The Daggatoun, Philadelphia, 1882.
