= History of the Jews in Ghana =

The location of Ghana in Africa

The history of the Jews of Ghana, previously known as the Gold Coast, is marked by a small presence. The contemporary Jewish community is small and mostly composed of foreign residents. The House of Israel, a community of aspiring converts, has begun to emerge in recent decades.

== Modern history ==
In 2015 the Chabad Lubavitch movement set up a Chabad house and synagogue in Accra Ghana that caters to tourists and visiting business people, mostly from Israel.

=== Ghana–Israel relations ===
Ghana–Israel relations refers to the current and historical relationship between Ghana and Israel. Ghana has an embassy in Ramat Gan, Israel, and Israel has an embassy in Accra. An Israeli consulate was established in Ghana in 1956, prior to independence. Ghana was the first country from Sub-Saharan Africa to establish diplomatic relations with Israel.

In April 1959, Israel, with help from India, supervised the establishment of the Ghana Air Force. A small Israeli team also trained aircraft maintenance personnel and radio technicians at the Accra-based Air Force Trade Training School. After prime minister Kwame Nkrumah's overthrow, Israeli military activities in Ghana ended, but Israel continued to aid Ghana in shipping, construction, security, research, manpower training, and agriculture. From shortly after the 1973 Yom Kippur War through September 2011, Israel and Ghana maintained basic diplomatic ties through Nigeria. In September 2011, Ghana and Israel renewed direct diplomatic relations.

== House of Israel ==
The House of Israel is a community in Ghana that claims to have roots in the Ten Lost Tribes of ancient Israel.

== See also ==
- History of the Jews in Africa

=== Regions: ===
- History of the Jews in Central Africa
- History of the Jews in East Africa
- History of the Jews in North Africa
- History of the Jews in Southern Africa
- History of the Jews in West Africa
