= Ghana–Palestine relations =

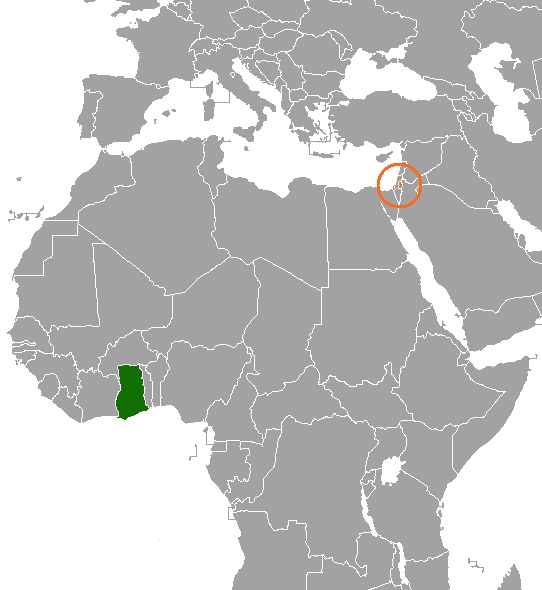

- Ghana: Palestine

Ghana recognised Palestine as a sovereign state on 29 November 1988, during the nearly four-decade hiatus in Ghana–Israel relations between 1973 and 2011. Ghana was among 138 countries to vote in favour of admitting Palestine into the United Nations (UN) as a non-member observer state on 29 November 2012. Palestine maintains an embassy in the Ghanaian capital Accra.

Ghana and Israel have historically had cordial relations, with Ghana initially expressing support for Israel after the 7 October 2023 attacks by Hamas and other Palestinian militant groups. However, Ghana has become increasingly critical of Israel's response to the attacks and its conduct during the Gaza war. On 26 September 2025, Ghanaian President John Mahama spoke to the UN General Assembly in support of the two-state solution and Palestinian statehood.

== History ==
Ghana's postcolonial relationship with the State of Israel was cordial and mutually beneficial during the late 1950s and early 1960s. Israel provided Ghana with economic assistance and military expertise, and in exchange Ghana promoted Israeli interests to other African countries who had not yet aligned with an anti-Zionist bloc led by Gamal Abdel Nasser's Egypt. To postcolonial Africa, Israel likewise portrayed itself as a postcolonial nation and Zionism as an indigenous liberation movement. However, Ghana–Israel relations soured following the Six-Day War of 1967 and Israel's decision to occupy the Sinai Peninsula, which it had captured from Egypt during the war. Ghana later severed diplomatic ties with Israel after the Yom Kippur War of 1973, and the relationship between the two countries was not renewed until 2011.

Ghana recognised the State of Palestine on 29 November 1988, two weeks after it was declared by the Palestine Liberation Organization on 15 November. Twenty-four years later, on 29 November 2012, Ghana voted alongside 137 other countries in favour of admitting Palestine into the United Nations (UN) as a non-member observer state.

Ghana initially supported Israel's response to the 7 October 2023 attacks by Hamas and other Palestinian militant groups. The Ghanaian Foreign Ministry released a statement on 8 October affirming Ghana's "support for Israel's right to exist and defend itself" but also urged restraint in Israel's response.

In June 2024, a motorcade drove through Accra as part of a "Global Day of Action for Palestine". Abdul Fatah al-Sattari, the Palestinian ambassador to Ghana, responded by expressing his gratitude to Ghanaians who supported Palestinians and distributing food to locals living in the vicinity of the Palestinian embassy to mark Eid al-Adha.

Ghanaian President John Mahama announced on 1 August 2025 that his country had donated 40 metric tons of locally produced, Golden Tree chocolate and other cocoa products to Palestine as humanitarian aid. Al-Sattari later thanked Mahama for the aid at a press conference on 28 August.

Speaking to the 80th session of the UN General Assembly on 26 September 2025, Mahama reaffirmed Ghana's support for a two-state solution to the Israeli–Palestinian conflict, Palestinian statehood, and an end to the Israeli blockade of the Gaza Strip, as well as other "crimes in Gaza" by Israel.

== Diplomatic missions ==
Palestine has an embassy in Accra.
