= Sefwi Sui =

- District Capital
- Country: Ghana
- Region: Western North Region
- District: Sefwi-Wiawso Municipal District
- Time zone: GMT
  - Summer (DST): GMT

Sefwi Sui is a small farming community in Ghana with a population of approximately 3,000 people. A Jewish community from the House of Israel lives in Sefwi Sui. Other Jews from the House of Israel live in Sefwi Wiawso, a larger community located twenty miles from Sefwi Sui.

Like other communities in the Western North Region of Ghana, the Alluolue Festival is celebrated annually in Sefwi Sui.
