= Ghana–Israel relations =

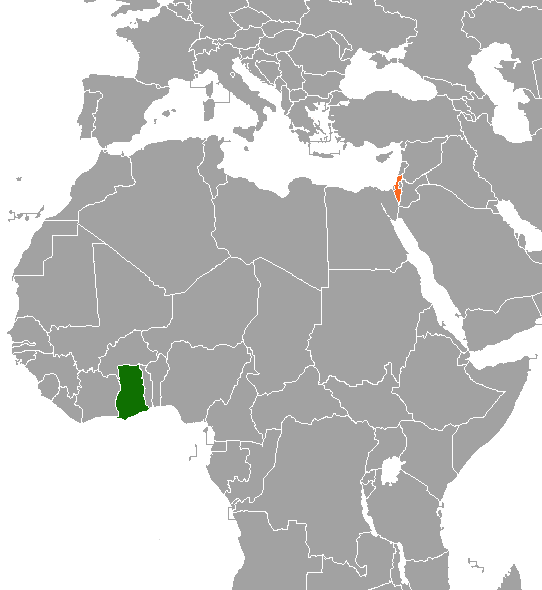
- Ghana: Israel

Relations between Ghana and Israel date back to the mid-1950s after Israel offered support to develop the Ghanaian armed forces. However, following the 1973 Yom Kippur War, Ghana severed relationships with Israel. In 2011, Ghana and Israel resumed formal relations and opened embassies in the Tel Aviv District city of Ramat Gan and Accra respectively.

== History ==
An Israeli consulate was established in Ghana in 1956, prior to independence. Ghana was the first country from Sub-Saharan Africa to establish diplomatic relations with Israel.

In 1958, Israel’s Foreign Minister Golda Meir, was the only foreign Cabinet member invited to participate in the official celebrations of Ghana’s first independence anniversary.

In April 1959, Israel, with help from India, supervised the establishment of the Ghana Air Force. A small Israeli team also trained aircraft maintenance personnel and radio technicians at the Accra-based Air Force Trade Training School. Although the British persuaded Ghanaian President Kwame Nkrumah to withdraw Israeli advisers in 1960, Ghanaian pilots continued to receive some training at aviation schools in Israel. After Nkrumah's overthrow, Israeli military activities in Ghana ended, but Israel continued to aid Ghana in shipping, construction, security, research, manpower training, and agriculture.

From shortly after the Yom Kippur War through September 2011, Israel and Ghana maintained basic diplomatic ties through Nigeria. In September 2011, Ghana and Israel renewed direct diplomatic relations.

In December 2025, three Israeli nationals were deported from Ghana to Israel after allegations of mistreatment against Ghanaians at Ben Gurion Airport, including several members of an official delegation attending a cyber security conference in Tel Aviv.

== Trade ==
In October 2004, a four-day Israeli trade fair titled "Applicable Technologies Fair 2004" occurred in Accra, Ghana. Ghanaian Minister of Trade and Industry Alan John Kyerematen urged investors to undertake mutual investments including in irrigation and agriculture.

== Gallery ==
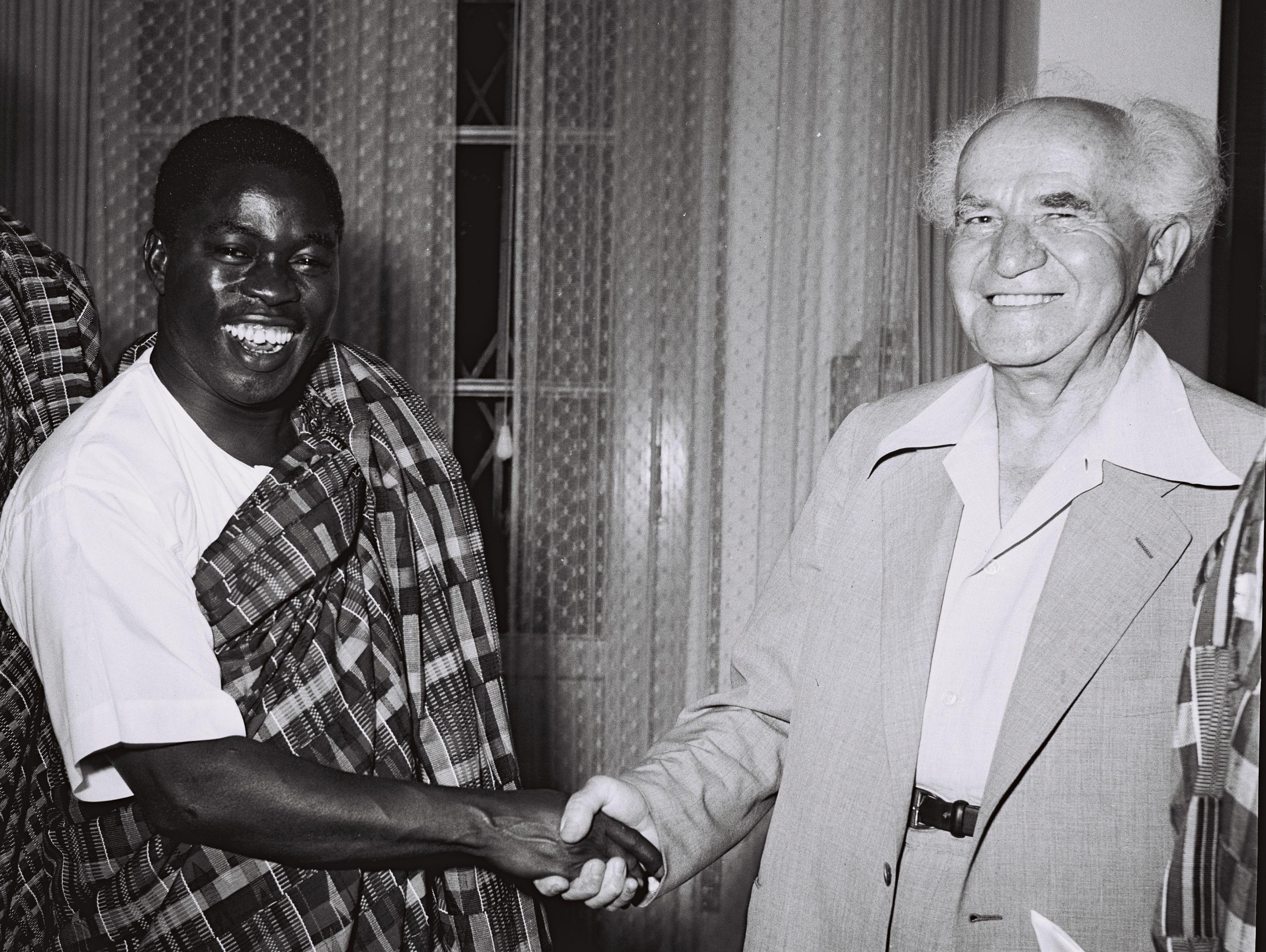
Krobo Edusei and Israeli Prime Minister David Ben-Gurion, 1959.

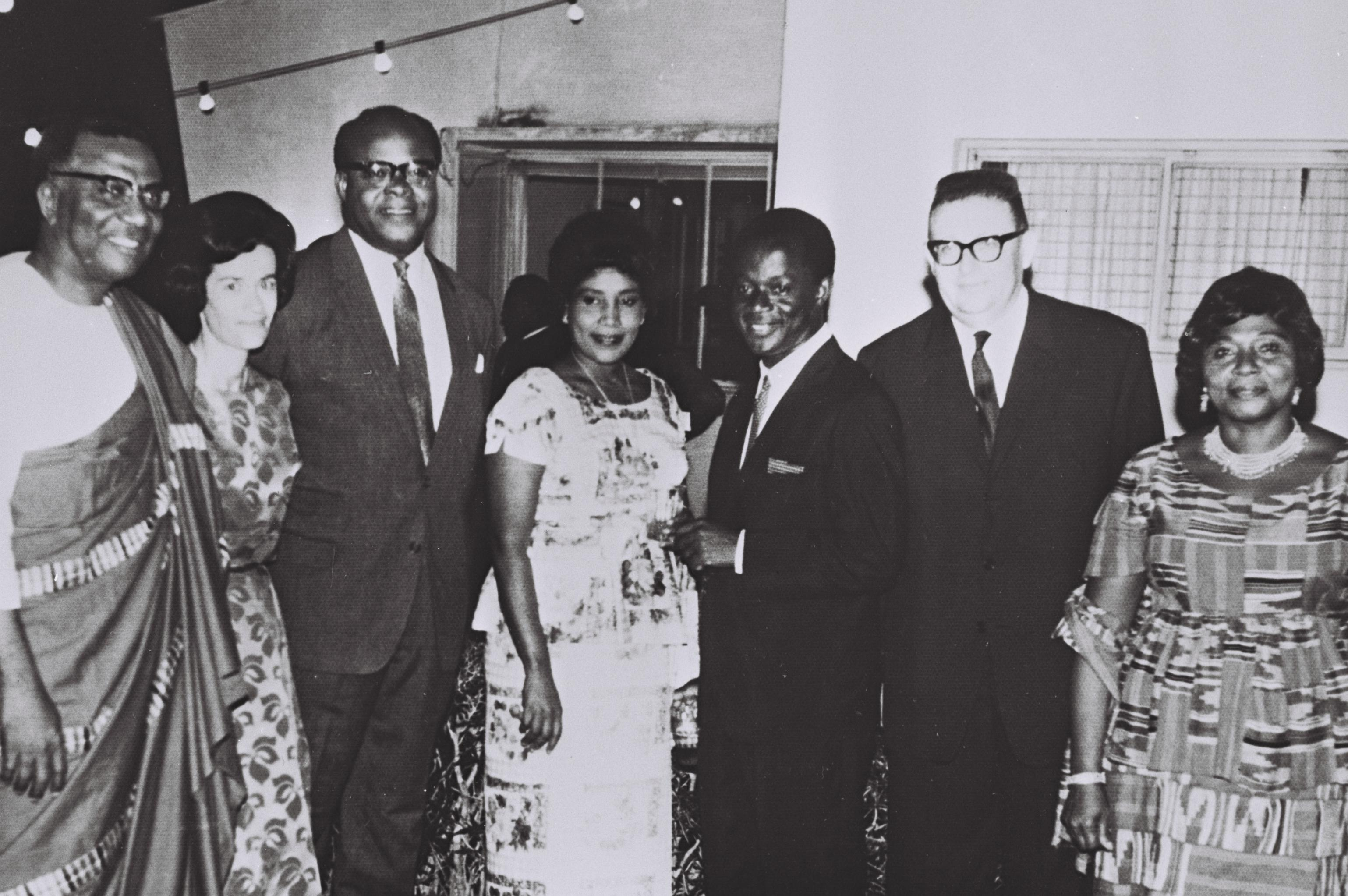
Israeli ambassador Michael Arnon at the embassy in Accra, 1964.

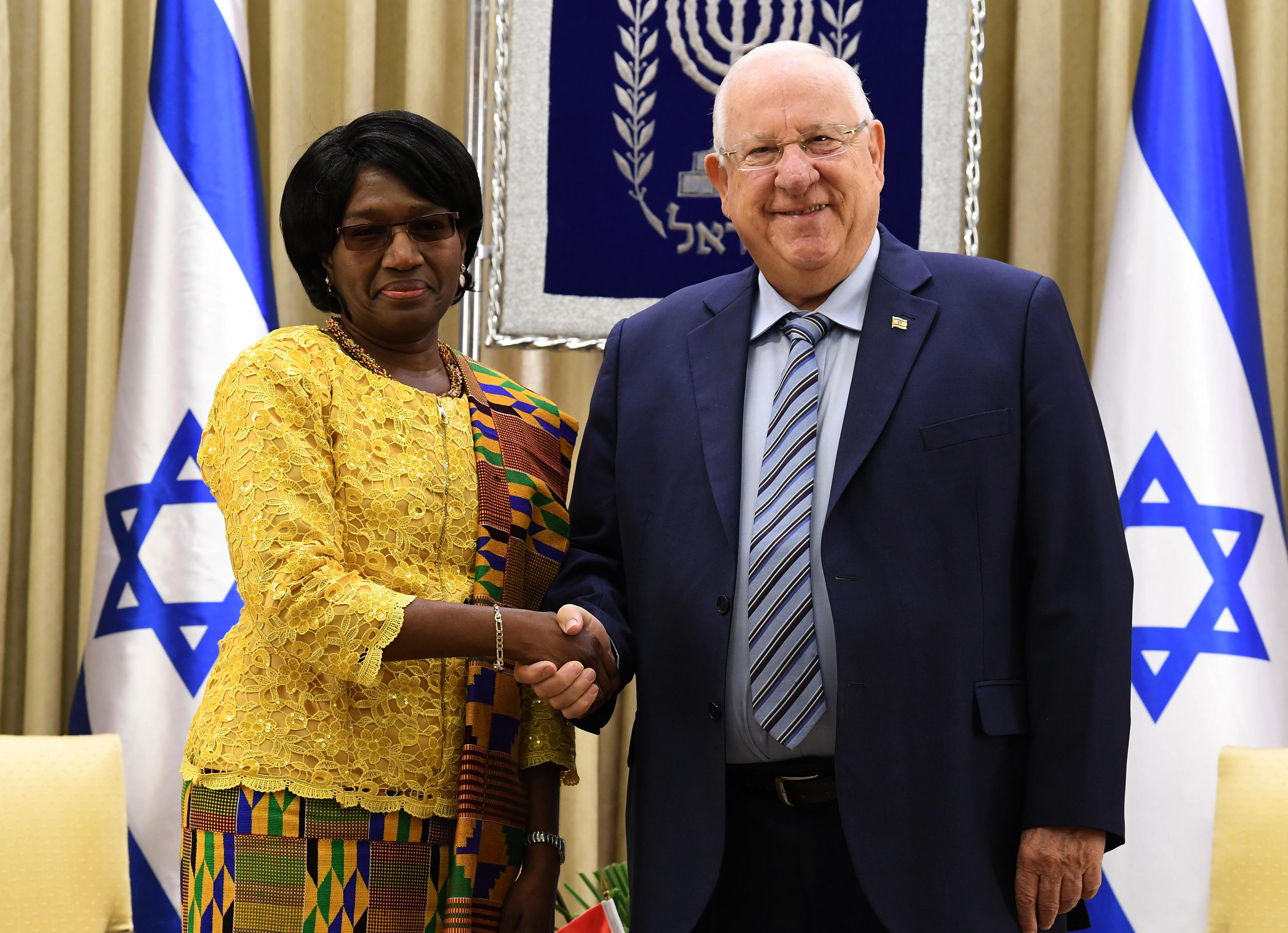
Ghanaian ambassador Hannah Ama Nyarko and Israeli President Reuven Rivlin, 2018.

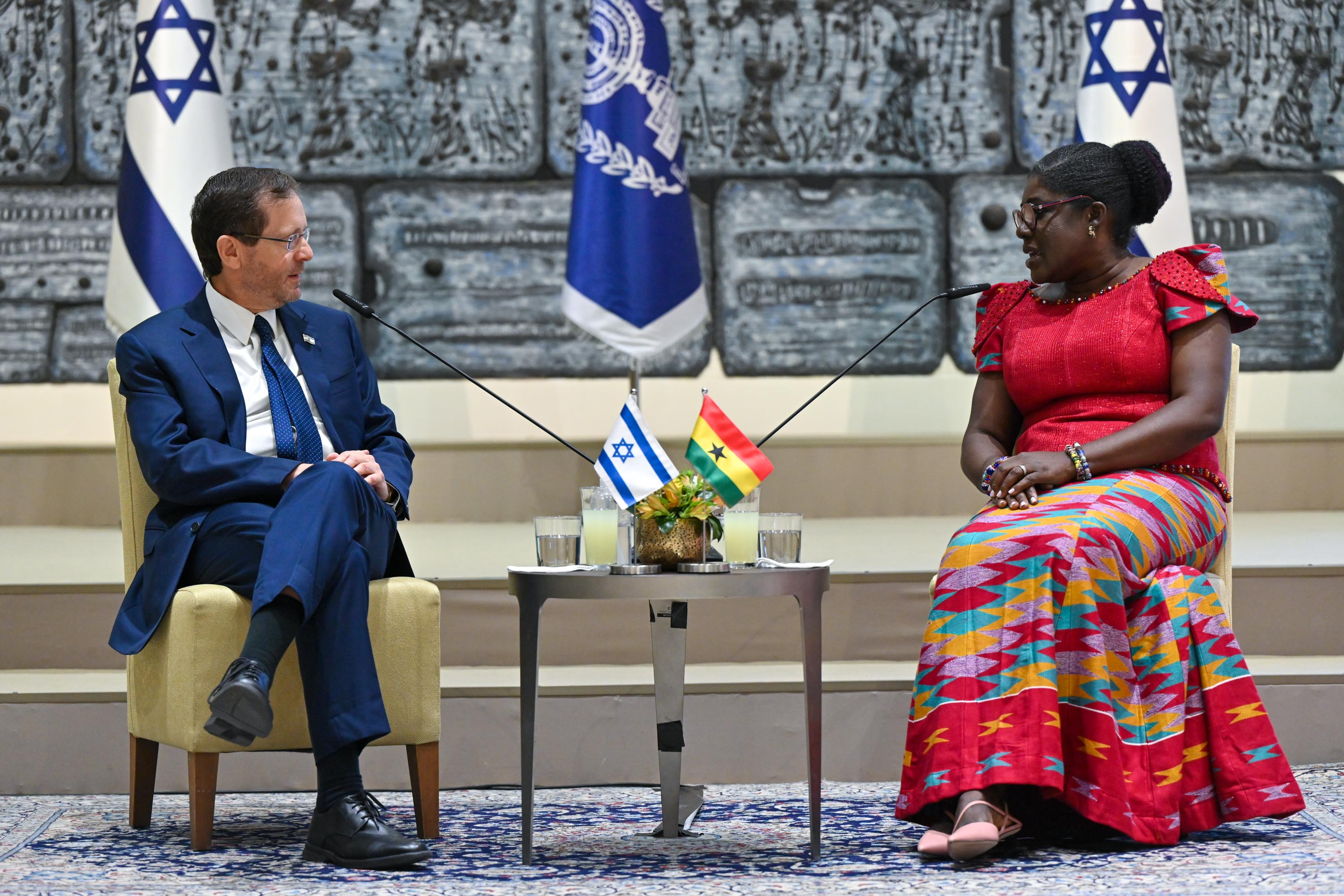
Israeli President Isaac Herzog and Ghanaian ambassador Lydia Ofosua Amartey, 2022.

== See also ==
- Ghana–Palestine relations
