= Mordecai Aby Serour =

Moroccan rabbi and explorer (1826–1886)

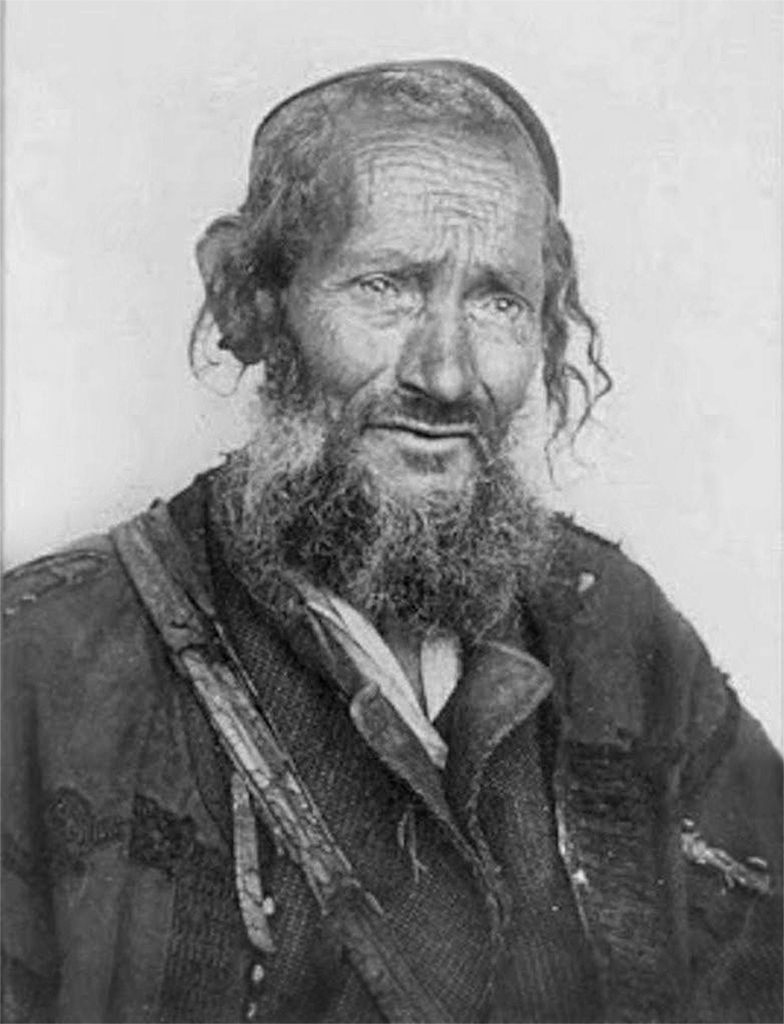
Rabbi Mordecai in the 1870s

Mordecai Aby Serour (1826 – 6 April 1886) was a Moroccan rabbi and explorer. During his life he was a merchant in Timbuktu, a correspondent of the Paris Geographical Society, and the guide of Charles de Foucauld in Morocco.

== Family and education ==
Mordecai Aby Serour was born in 1826 in Akka in southern Morocco, in the present-day Souss-Massa region, near the high mountains then known as the "Doubany". At the time, Akka was an oasis inhabited by about forty Jewish families scattered among three *tchours*, under the domination of the Berber tribe of the Brybet. His father, Iaïch Aby Serour, was a jeweller, and his brother was born in Mhamid al Ghozlan. Mordecai was the fourth of Iaïch's seven sons.

At the age of five, he was sent to the community rabbi, where he learned to read and write. He was a diligent and devout child. At the age of nine, he left his village in the extreme south of Morocco alone and without money and travelled to Marrakesh, in the centre of the country, which was famous for the Talmudic schools of its mellah. There he studied the Talmud and Hebrew. At thirteen, following his bar mitzvah in 1839, this gifted student was sent to Jerusalem to pursue rabbinical studies. On his journey, the young adolescent was received by the principal Jewish communities along his route, including those of Mogador (today Essaouira), Tangier, Gibraltar, Provence, Thessaloniki, Constantinople, Smyrna and Jaffa, before reaching Jerusalem. It took him three years to reach Palestine, where he spent four years in a yeshiva, emerging in 1846 with the title of rabbi.

He subsequently served the Jewish community of Aleppo in Syria for a year. This enabled him to save enough money to begin his return journey to the Maghreb. Travelling with caravaneers, he followed the route extending the spice and incense trade routes through Egypt and Libya, along the desert coast, through Tripolitania and Tunisia and into Algeria. He stopped successively in Tunis, Constantine, Philippeville (present-day Skikda), Algiers, where he lived from 1847 to 1858, and Oran, where he worked as a rabbi teaching the Talmud. French Algeria, and the progress, education and freedom it offered Jews, enabling them to improve their social position, made a strong impression on him. He became Algerian and obtained a French passport, thereby becoming a French protected person. He would later regret that he had not learned French.

== Travels in the Sahara ==
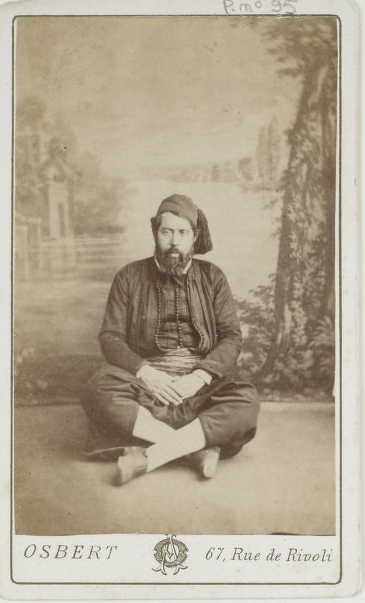
Mardochée Aby Serour dans les années 1860. Photo d'Auguste Osbert.

He subsequently went to Tamantit, in what is now southern Algeria, the former Jewish capital of Touat. There he established commercial contacts with Salomon Ohayon, a merchant from Mogador, and with caravaneers who at that time travelled from Marrakesh towards the Sudan, passing through Akka. Having made his fortune, he returned to his native village of Akka in 1858, where he found his father living in poverty. He became the family's principal support, since the family jewellery and goldsmithing business was no longer profitable during a period of famine.

He then decided to cross the Sahara with his younger brother Itzhak in order to reach Timbuktu, the mysterious Sahelian city, a holy city of Islam which was forbidden and particularly dangerous for non-Muslims. He thus became the first Jew to enter Timbuktu.

The beginning of his camel journey went well. He crossed Tindouf, Teghazza, Taoudeni and Bir Ounane, despite the scarcity of fresh water. However, after 49 days of travel, he was stopped at Araouane, in present-day northern Mali, by the sheikh of the Berabich Arabs, Cheikh Sidi Ahmed Abya Ould Muhhamad Ould-el-Rahal, a fanatic who swore to have the Jews killed.

Aby Serour was forced to promise to convert to Islam and gave him half of everything he possessed in exchange for his life, until they appeared before the "tholbas". There he declared that he wished to remain Jewish. Knowing Islamic law and Muslim traditions, he agreed to pay the jizya, the tax imposed by Islamic law on the People of the Book. At the time this amounted to “5 Mizen of gold per ear”, or 250 francs for the two travellers.

He and his brother remained at Araouane for a year, until they found a way of continuing to Timbuktu without being killed. When he eventually obtained permission to continue his journey, his brother remained behind at Araouane.

== Stay in Timbuktu ==
After facing several dangers, he reached Hamdallaye, the capital of the Fulani Macina Empire, by way of the Niger River. His arrival in Timbuktu as a Jew caused a public scandal among the Moorish merchants, scholars and general population. Aby Serour had to use his eloquence and his knowledge of the Qur'an to calm the situation. He was received by the ruler, Ahmadou Ahmadou, whom he persuaded to grant him — and any Jew or Christian who might subsequently apply — the right to reside and trade in Timbuktu in return for payment of the *jizya*. His business prospered in the city. He summed up his impressions by saying that “the population of Timbuktu is harmless”. In 1860, he sent for his brother, who had been waiting for him at Araouane, and continued to run his business.

In 1863, having made his fortune, he returned to Morocco to see his family, give his earnings to his father, sell his gold dust, ostrich feathers and ivory, and travel as far as Italy to purchase cheap goods and glass beads. He also tried to persuade family and friends to join him in the Sahel. He went to Mogador, made large purchases, and then set out again for Timbuktu with twenty-eight loads of merchandise and four relatives, travelling for twenty-three days. By 1864 there were enough Jews in Timbuktu to constitute a "minyan", and a normal communal life was established among those whom Mordechaï Abbi Serour had persuaded to join him: his brothers Josué (Ysou), Avraham and Yitzhaq Serour; Aharon (Aroun) and David Serour, sons of Josué; Yitzhaq, son of Aharon; Abraham Aby Serour, his cousin; Isaac Ben Mouchi; Moussa Mazaltarim, Mordechaï's brother-in-law; David Mazaltarim, Moussa's son; Rabbi Raphael; and Shimon Ben-Yaaqov.

One member of this circle, Isaac ben Mouchi, voluntarily converted to Islam. Isaac Aby Serour died in 1867, followed by Abraham Aby Serour in 1870. et Isaac Aby Serour en 1867 puis Abraham Aby Serour en 1870 meurent The small community soon encountered difficulties. Because of external pressure from Moroccan merchants who were commercial rivals and who had previously contented themselves with regularly plundering his caravans, all his property was confiscated by the city's governor in 1869, while he was away. Together with his brother, Serour left the region permanently in 1871, having narrowly escaped death and having been robbed again on the journey back to Akka by the Oulad Bou Sbaâ. He nevertheless made one final attempt to recover his wealth from Timbuktu, but without success. He returned to Akka, where his father had meanwhile died. His family, which refused to share the inheritance with him, forced him to settle in Algiers and teach at the local synagogue. He subsequently moved with his wife to Mogador.

== Correspondent of the Paris Geographical Society ==
In 1869 he met the French consul in Mogador, Auguste Beaumier. Since 1866, Beaumier had been fascinated by this travelling rabbi, who knew the mysteries of the *bilâd as-sûdân*, the western Sahara, the "land of the Blacks"; had lived peacefully in a Jewish trading community in Timbuktu; and spoke Arabic, Berber, Fulani and Bambara.

On returning to his native region, Serour recounted his African adventures to Beaumier. Beaumier translated his story from Judeo-Arabic into French, and it was published in the *Bulletin de Paris Geographical Society: la Société de Géographie de Paris*, for which Serour worked from 1870 to 1878, under the title *Premier établissement des Israélites à Timbouctou* (“The First Jewish Settlement in Timbuktu”)., sous le titre Premier établissement des Israélites à Timbouctou

He subsequently worked for French learned societies, travelling through distant regions and collecting specimens of flora and minerals.

In 1873, Beaumier introduced Serour to Samuel Hirsch, director of the Alliance Israélite Universelle school in Tangier. Between 1870 and 1874, Beaumier sent letters to the AIU headquarters in Paris suggesting that Serour might become a French agent in the *bleds* of southern Morocco.

It was in order to acquire scientific training that he travelled to Paris, where he caused a sensation. He was introduced to the explorer Henri Duveyrier, who taught him how to use geographical instruments. Articles about him appeared in *Le Monde illustré* and the *Journal officiel*, and he met leading figures in the scientific world.

On returning to Morocco, he undertook several expeditions and supplied scientific material to French scholars of the Paris Geographical Society in fields including geography, cartography and archaeology. Among other things, he brought to Western attention the existence of the Daggatoun, a nomadic tribe of Jewish origin living on the margins of the Sahara, who told him, “We are Jews and our ancestors came from Tamentit.” This discovery attracted little attention, however, except from the AIU, which employed him for a time to learn more about the Jewish groups of the Sahara whose dialects Serour knew.

His relationship with the Paris Geographical Society and the AIU ended in 1880.

== Guide to Charles de Foucauld ==
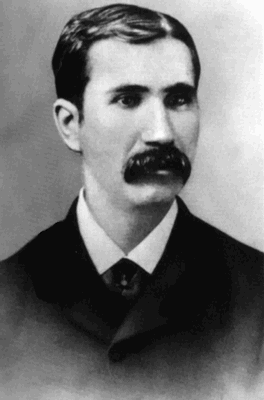
Charles de Foucauld, 1886

Following the death of the French consul, Serour once again fell into obscurity. He left Morocco to teach the Talmud in Oran, Algeria. He lived in poverty there and his health deteriorated.

On the advice of Oscar MacCarthy of the Algiers library, the explorer Charles de Foucauld hired him as a guide for an expedition to Morocco, a country then closed to Christians. Serour carried out this mission at considerable risk to his life, passing Foucauld off as a Russian Jew named Joseph Aleman. The two men claimed to be emissaries from Palestine collecting funds for rabbinical schools in Jerusalem responsible for training Moroccan rabbis.

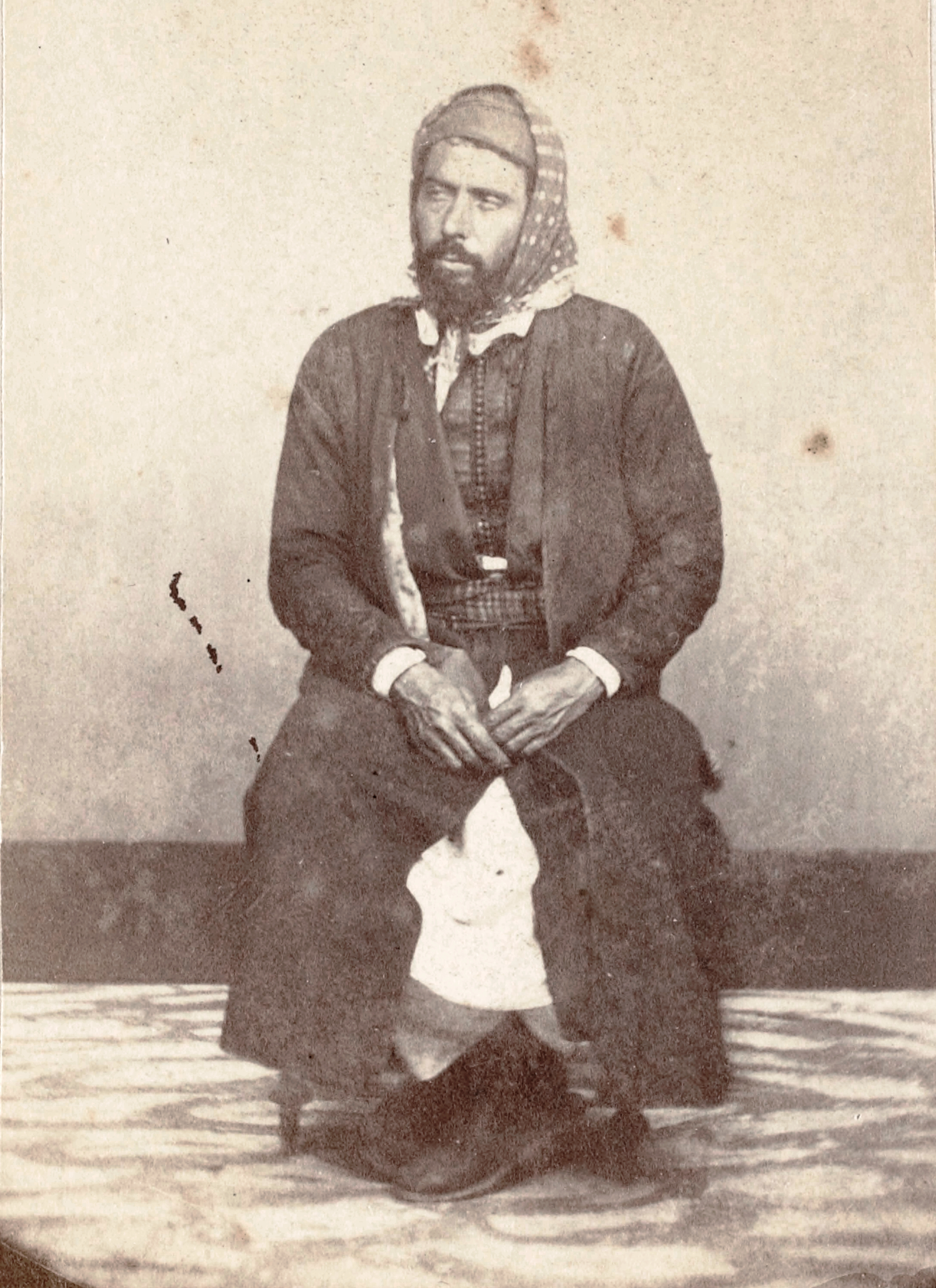
Aby Serour à Mogador, photo de Charles F. Hecquard, v. 1860.

With Serour, Foucauld lived as a poor man, eating kosher food with families who offered them hospitality, attending the synagogue and observing the Sabbath. As Foucauld himself wrote, he accepted the humiliation of “degrading” himself by disguising himself as a Jew in order to have greater freedom in his work.

While they were still in Algeria, they encountered French officers of the 4th Chasseurs d'Afrique at Tlemcen on 13 June 1883. The officers did not recognise Foucauld. One of them mocked him, saying: “Look at that Jew squatting there eating olives. He looks like a monkey.”

Foucauld and Serour entered Morocco and were given hospitality by Jewish families. One of them would climb onto a roof to take measurements while the other kept watch, distracting any curious onlookers.

In particularly dangerous regions they had to negotiate with *caïds* or hire horsemen to protect them. On one occasion, while climbing the High Atlas, the three Arabs accompanying them as supposed protectors robbed them of everything except their lives and Foucauld's instruments and notebooks.

The two travellers took refuge with a Jewish community, which protected them, and eventually returned to Algeria after almost eleven months of travel rather than the five originally planned.

This journey under a false identity enabled Foucauld to travel throughout the country and gather valuable information that was later used in establishing the French Protectorate of Morocco, a country that was at that time in revolt.

He came to understand that the prohibition on Christians entering these territories was not simply due to religious intolerance in Islam but to fear of invasion by a foreign nation, as had happened in Algeria, Tunisia and Senegal. In practice, it was easier for Arabs to kill a supposed spy than an “infidel”. This explains the danger of his journey with Serour, since other explorers before him—often disguised as Muslims—had been murdered in the region. Having passed himself off as a Jew, Foucauld wrote in his travel account:

“The Israelites… in the eyes of Muslims, are not men…”

Charles de Foucauld does not even mention Aby Serour by name — or even the word “Jews” — in the list of people he thanked in his travel journal, later published as *Reconnaissance au Maroc (1883–1884)*. The work nevertheless contains numerous antisemitic descriptions of Moroccan Jews, including the statement:

“I write less evil of the Jews of Morocco than I think. To speak favourably of them would be to alter the truth.”.

The travel account was published in 1888 and was highly successful. Foucauld, who would later, after his conversion, want to see “Jesus in every human being”, used derogatory language about Serour in private correspondence and did not pay him proper tribute until much later.

Biographical evidence about Foucauld suggests that at Saint-Cyr and Saumur he absorbed some of the antisemitism prevalent in the French army after the defeat of 1870 against Germany, which reached its height during the Dreyfus Affair in 1892.

Worn down by the journey and prematurely aged, Aby Serour died less than two years later, in poverty and obscurity, in Algiers on 6 April 1886. He was buried in the St. Eugene Cemetery in Algiers.

His son, Emile Haim Abisror, became an accountant in Algiers. Aby Serour's sons and cousins simplified their surname to “Abisror”.

== Biographical documents ==
His early biography has come down to us in part through the account he himself gave in his work Premier établissement des Israélites à Tombouctou; through information provided by Charles de Foucauld to the lawyer and writer René Bazin, which was reported in Bazin's book Charles de Foucauld, explorateur du Maroc; through correspondence concerning Aby Serour exchanged between the Alliance Israélite and Consul Beaumier, M. Maunoir (secretary-general of the Société de Géographie), and Léon Philippe (assistant secretary of the Commission for the Algiers–Senegal railway); through correspondence from Emile Haïm Abisor (Mardochée's son); and through accounts from other people in Oran, Mogador, Fez, and Marrakesh.

In 2011, the writer Kébir Mustapha Ammi published a novel entitled Mardochée, written entirely in the first person and presented as the Moroccan rabbi's testament. The novel recounts Charles de Foucauld's reconnaissance of Morocco, with Foucauld identified by his assumed name, Joseph Aleman. Although all the places and characters mentioned are real, it is difficult to describe the work as a historical novel. The author uses real events within an authentic historical context, while nevertheless making constant departures from, and sometimes outright distortions of, the historical record. A more recent work on Foucauld and Serour's journey through Morocco highlighted "the incalculable number of absurdities, lies, falsehoods, deliberate or inadvertent omissions, and manifest errors" found in Kébir Ammi's book.

The authors of this 2018 work confirm the impression of some readers that the book was written out of "hatred" for Charles de Foucauld. Contrary to what is stated in the novel, the two travellers never set foot during their journey in Mouay Idris, Volubilis or Tiznit. Foucauld did not promote Christianity during the journey and never expressed the Islamophobic sentiments attributed to him by the author; quite the contrary. He was not homosexual, as the novel suggests, nor did he have any connection with Pétain. As for the character of Mardochée, who commits murders and leads a dissolute life, this bears no relation to the person described in the biographies devoted to him.
