= House of Israel (Ghana) =

Jewish community in Ghana

Total population
- c. 400 (est.)

Regions with significant populations
- 200 in Ghana

Languages
- Sefwi, French, English

Religion
- Judaism

Related ethnic groups
- Sefwi

The House of Israel is a Jewish community located in southwestern Ghana, in the towns of Sefwi Wiawso and Sefwi Sui. This group of people, mostly of the Sefwi tribe, built a synagogue in 1998. Many of the men and children read English, but no one knows Hebrew. The House of Israel claims to have roots in the Ten Lost Tribes of ancient Israel.

== History ==
The people of Sefwi Wiawso, who claim to have roots in the Ten Lost Tribes of ancient Israel, trace a call for a "return" to normative Judaism by Aaron Ahomtre Toakyirafa, a community leader who, in 1976, is said to have had a vision. In 2012, Gabrielle Zilkha, a Toronto-based filmmaker, visited Sefwe Wiawso to do research for a documentary about the House of Israel she is making. According to Zilkha, about 200 people—mostly children—live in the community. She states that the lack of a historical record makes it difficult to verify the group's claims, but that there is an oral tradition dating back 200 years.

In the 1990s, the House of Israel began to reach out to the wider Jewish world. The community worked with Jewish organizations such as Kulanu and Be'chol Lashon. A smaller community of Jews from the House of Israel lives in Sefwi Sui, a small farming community located twenty miles from Sefwi Wiawso. In the two communities, many of the men and children read English, but no one knows Hebrew.

The leader of the House of Israel since 1993, David Ahenkorah claims to have received his own vision in taking up the mantle. He has been granted a 40-acre plot of land to build a Jewish school for the community, but they have not yet been able to raise funds for construction. Children currently attend a local school run by Christians.

The community built a synagogue in 1998 in New Adiembra, a Jewish neighborhood in Sefwi Wiawso. Recently, they painted it blue and white, colors commonly associated with Judaism. There are several family compounds nearby and about 200 people belong to the synagogue. It is a single-room synagogue with a miniature Sefer Torah. There is no mechitza.

== See also ==
- Beta Israel
- History of ancient Israel and Judah
- Jews of Bilad el-Sudan
- Kingdom of Israel
