= List of Jews from the Arab world =

Until the 20th century, Jews accounted for a significant minority among the populations of West Asia and North Africa, which has mostly consisted of the Arab world since the early Muslim conquests. Following the 1948 Arab–Israeli War, the majority of the Arab world's Jews—numbering around 900,000 people—left or were expelled in waves of mass movement that continued until the 1970s. Roughly 72% of these Jewish communities were absorbed by Israel and the remainder largely by the Western world. This article provides a list of prominent Jews with either full or partial origins in the territory of the Arab world from as far back as the early medieval era.

== Al-Andalus ==
- Dunash ben Labrat, commentator, poet, and grammarian
- Mūsā ibn Maymūn, medieval philosopher and Torah scholar
- Abu Harun Musa bin Ya'acub ibn Ezra, philosopher and linguist
- Hasdai ibn Shaprut, scholar, physician, and diplomat

== Algeria ==
- Isaac Alfasi, Talmudist and posek; best known for his work of halakha
- Jacques Attali, economist, writer
- Cheb i Sabbah, famous club DJ
- Lili Boniche, musician
- Patrick Bruel, singer, actor
- Alain Chabat, actor
- Hélène Cixous, feminist writer
- Claude Cohen-Tannoudji, physicist, Nobel prize (1997)
- Jacques Derrida, deconstructionist philosopher
- Alphonse Halimi, boxer; World Bantamweight champion
- Roger Hanin, film actor and director
- Bernard-Henri Lévy, French philosopher
- Enrico Macias (Gaston Ghrenassia), French singer
- Line Monty (Eliane Sarfati), Algerian singer
- Reinette l'Oranaise, famous Algerian singer from Oran. Known as one of Oran's respected artists. Best known for Nhabek Nhabek and Mazal Haï Mazal

== Bahrain ==
- Menasheh Idafar, of Iraqi descent, former Bahraini/British racing driver with dual citizenship
- Nancy Khedouri, of Iraqi descent, current member of parliament, of Iraqi origin
- Ebrahim Daoud Nonoo, of Iraqi descent, former member of parliament
- Houda Ezra Nonoo, of Iraqi descent, former member of parliament and former Ambassador of Bahrain to the US
- Misha Nonoo, of British-Iraqi descent, US-based British-Bahraini fashion designer

== Egypt ==
- André Aciman, writer and academic
- Guy Béart, French singer
- Eli Cohen, celebrated Israeli spy
- Sir Ronald Cohen, Egyptian-born businessman
- Jacques Hassoun, psychoanalyst, writer
- Aura Herzog, widow of sixth Israeli president Chaim Herzog
- Eric Hobsbawm, historian (Jewish-Polish and -German parents living in Cairo)
- Isaac Israeli ben Solomon, physician and philosopher
- Edmond Jabès, poet
- Paula Jacques, writer, journalist, radio show producer
- Jacqueline Kahanoff, writer
- Ranan Lurie, political cartoonist
- Moshe Marzouk, doctor
- Togo Mizrahi, film director, actor, writer, and producer
- Roland Moreno, engineer, inventor of the Smart Card
- Layla Murad, singer
- Haim Saban, TV producer
- Saadia ben Yosef, rabbi
- Sylvain Sylvain (Sylvain Mizrahi), guitarist for New York Dolls
- Bat Ye'or, historian
- Avraham Yosef, rabbi
- Yaakov Yosef, rabbi
- Ahmed Zayat, entrepreneur and owner of Zayat Stables LLC

== Iraq ==
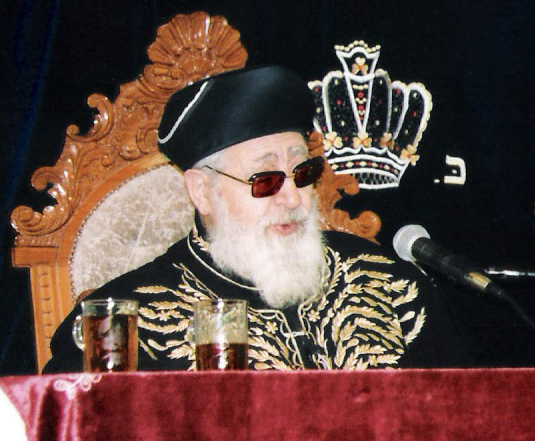
Ovadia Yosef

- Many Tannaim and Amoraim, including:
  - Abba Arika, "Rabh", amora
  - Shmuel Yarchina'ah, "Mar Samuel", or Samuel of Nehardea, amora
  - Rav Huna
  - Rav Chisda
  - Abaye, amora
  - Rav Papa, amora
  - Rav Ashi (Abana), rav, amora
- Anan ben David, founder of Qara'ism
- Sir Sassoon Eskell
  Alan Yentob, television executive, broadcaster
- Avi Shlaim, Oxford professor
- Binyamin Ben-Eliezer, politician
- Dodai ben Nahman, scholar
- Shlomo Hillel, diplomat and politician
- Ya'qub Bilbul, poet
- Sir Sassoon Eskell, statesman and financier
- Marcus Samuel, 1st Viscount Bearsted, Lord Mayor of London, businessman
- Naeim Giladi, writer
- Sir Naim Dangoor, entrepreneur and philanthropist
- N.J. Dawood, translator of Koran
- Hakham Yosef Chayyim of Baghdad, "Ben Ish Chai"
- Yitzchak Kadouri, rabbi and kabbalist
- Yitzhak Yamin, painter and sculptor
- Hila Klein, member of American-Israeli husband and wife duo h3h3Productions, best known for their YouTube channel of the same name. Family is of mixed Libyan and Iraqi Jewish heritage
- Elie Kedourie, historian
- Jessica Meir, astronaut, physiologist
- Sami Michael, writer
- Shafiq Ades, wealthy businessman
- Samir Naqqash, novelist
- Selim Zilkha, entrepreneur
- Maurice and Charles Saatchi, advertising executives
- Yona Sabar, scholar, linguist and researcher
- David Sassoon, merchant, and Sassoon family
- Yaakov Chaim Sofer, rabbi
- Ovadia Yosef, rabbi
- Ibrahim Hesqel, politician
- Dr. Eliyahu

== Kuwait ==
- Saleh and Daoud Al-Kuwaity, singers of Iranian-Iraqi descent

== Libya ==
- George Borba, footballer
- Hila Klein, member of American-Israeli husband and wife duo h3h3Productions, best known for their YouTube channel of the same name. Family is of mixed Libyan and Iraqi Jewish heritage
- Moses Hacmon, Israeli artist and architect. Family is of mixed Libyan Jewish, Turkish Jewish and Iraqi Jewish heritage
- Yitzhak Tshuva, Libyan-born Israeli billionaire businessman
- Moshe Kahlon, a retired Israeli politician, born to Libyan parents who immigrated from Tripoli
- Yossef Romano (1940 – 1972) was a Libyan-born Israeli weightlifter
- Amos Lavi (1953 - 2010) was a Libyan-born Israeli actor

== Lebanon ==
- David Nahmad, backgammon champion and art dealer
- Yfrah Neaman, violinist
- Gad Saad, evolutionary behavioral scientist
- Heiny Srour, film director

== Morocco ==
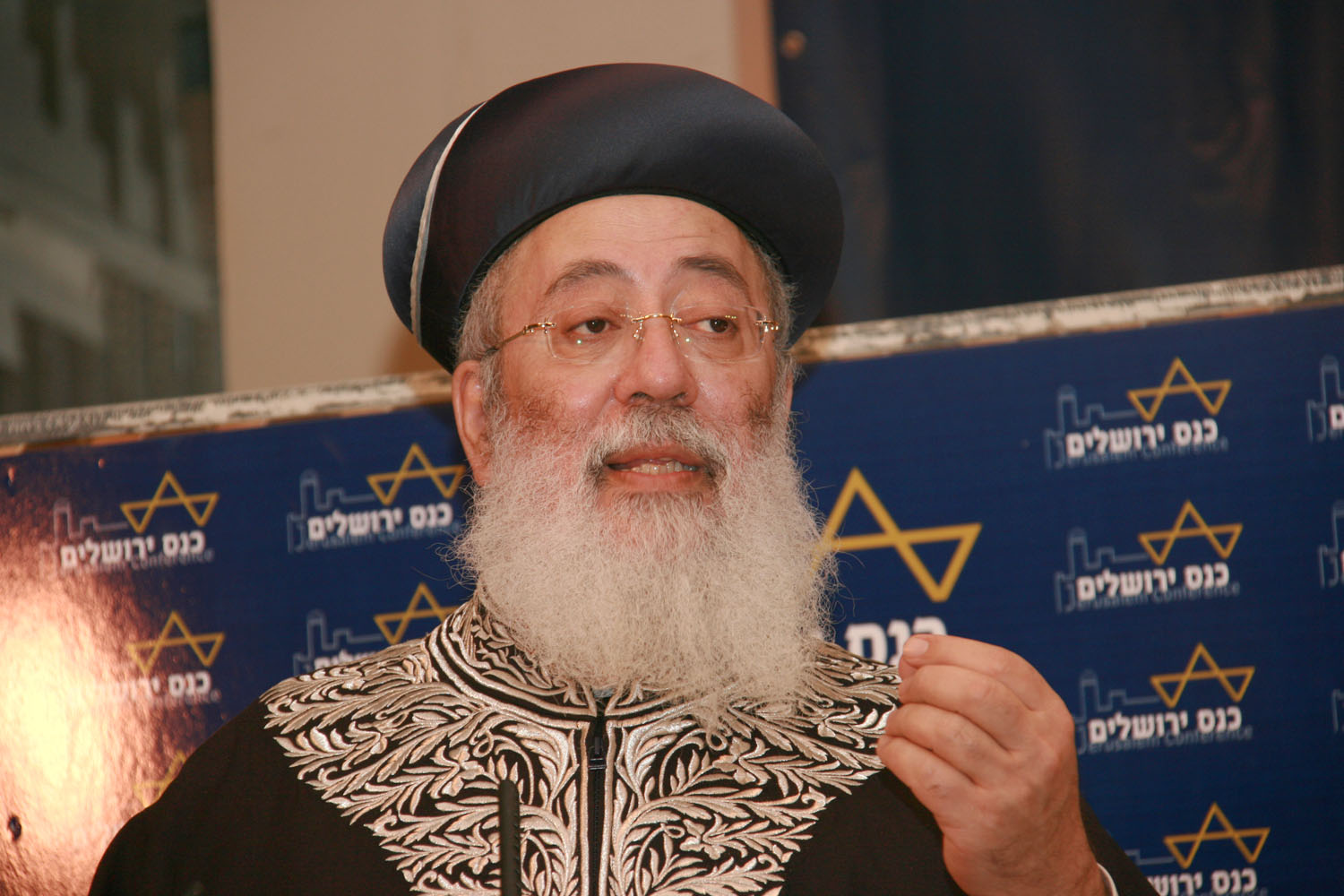
Rabbi Shlomo Amar

- Michel Abitbol, academic at the Hebrew University of Jerusalem
- Amram Aburbeh, Sephardi Dayan, Scholar Chief Rabbi of Petah Tikva, born in Tétouan. Best known of his work Netivei-Am
- Shlomo Amar, Sephardi Chief Rabbi of Israel
- Robert Assaraf, historian and writer
- André Azoulay, advisor to Kings Hassan II and Mohammed VI
- Shlomo Ben-Ami, Israeli diplomat, politician and author, born in Tangier
- Ralph Benmergui, Canadian media personality, born in Tangier
- Raphael Berdugo, dayan, scholar, and rabbi
- Salomon Berdugo, poet and rabbi from Meknes
- Frida Boccara, singer from Casablanca
- Aryeh Deri, Israeli politician, a former leader of Shas Party
- Edmond Amran El Maleh, writer
- André Elbaz, painter and filmmaker from El Jadida
- Gad Elmaleh, humorist, actor
- Serge Haroche, Nobel-winning physicist
- David Hassine, liturgic poet and rabbi
- Dunash ben Labrat, grammarian, poet
- David Levy, Israeli politician
- Nahum Ma'arabi, Hebrew poet and translator of the 13th century
- Chalom Messas, Grand Rabbi of Morocco until 2003
- David Messas, Grand Rabbi of Paris since 1995
- Amir Peretz, Israeli politician, leader of the Labor Party
- David Rebibo, congregational rabbi and Jewish day school dean in Phoenix, Arizona
- Baba Sali, rabbi
- Abraham Serfaty, political activist
- Meir Sheetrit, Israeli politician of Kadima
- Avi Toledano, singer who competed at the Eurovision Song Contest
- Mordechai Vanunu, Israeli dissident (converted to Christianity)

== Saudi Arabia ==
- Samaw'al ibn 'Adiya (Samuel ibn 'Adiya), poet, warrior
- David Reubeni, false messiah claimant

== Sudan ==
- Nessim Gaon, financier

== Syria ==
- Paula Abdul, singer, actress, and television personality
- Ezra Attiya, rabbi and rosh yeshiva
- Émile Benveniste, linguist
- Frank Harary, mathematician, one of the fathers of modern graph theory
- Jose Mugrabi, billionaire fine art dealer, owner of the world's largest Andy Warhol collection
- Hillel Nahmad, banker and patriarch of the Nahmad family
  - David Nahmad, son of Hillel, billionaire fine art dealer
    - Helly Nahmad, son of David, fine art dealer
  - Ezra Nahmad, son of Hillel, billionaire fine art dealer
    - Helly Nahmad, son of Ezra, fine art dealer
  - Giuseppe Nahmad, son of Hillel, billionaire fine art dealer
- Jacob Safra, banker and patriarch of the Safra family
  - Edmond Safra, son of Jacob, billionaire banker and former head of Republic New York Corporation
  - Joseph Safra, son of Jacob, billionaire banker and cofounder of Safra Group
    - Alberto J. Safra, son of Joseph, billionaire banker
  - Moise Safra, son of Jacob, billionaire banker and cofounder of Safra Group
- Dennis Sciama, physicist, one of the founders of modern cosmology
- Jerry Seinfeld, comedian
- Esther Moyal, journalist, writer and women's rights activist

== Tunisia ==
- Dove Attia, French-Tunisian musical television producer
- Max Azria, French-Tunisian fashion designer, founder of BCBG
- Roger Bismuth, Tunisian senator
- Alain Boublil, French musical theatre lyricist and librettist
- Michel Boujenah, French Tunisian comedian and humorist
- Paul Boujenah, French-Tunisian film director
- Dany Brillant, French singer
- Claude Challe, French club impresario and DJ
- Pierre Darmon, French tennis player
- Jacques Haïk, French producer
- Gisèle Halimi, Tunisian lawyer and essayist
- Élie Kakou, French actor and humorist
- Pierre Lellouche, French politician
- Albert Memmi, French novelist and sociologist
- Habiba Msika, Tunisian singer, dancer and actress
- Victor Perez, Tunisian boxing world champion
- Silvan Shalom, Israeli politician and former foreign minister
- René Trabelsi, Tunisian politician
- Nissim Zvili, Israeli politician and diplomat

== Yemen ==
- Rabbi Nethanel ben Isaiah
- Rabbi Jacob ben Nathanael
- Shoshana Damari, Israeli singer
- Ofra Haza, famous Israeli singer
- Rabbi Yosef Qafih rabbi and leader of Baladi Yemenite Jewish community
- Abdullah ibn Saba, converted to Islam (born Jewish)
- Rabiah ibn Mudhar and Dhu Nuwas, kings of Himyarite
- Wahb bin Munabbih (?–732), allegedly a Jew who converted to Islam
- Rabbi Shalom Shabazi, rabbi and poet
- Rabbi Shalom Sharabi
- Rabbi Yihya Yitzhak HaLevi
- Rabbi Shlomo Korah, chief rabbi of Bnei Brak
- Rabbi Azarya Basis, chief rabbi of Rosh HaAyin
- Rabbi Shimon Baadani, leading Sephardi rabbi and rosh kollel in Israel.
- Rabbi Avraham Al-Naddaf, one of the leaders of Yemenite Jews in Jerusalem
- Rabbi Amnon Yitzhak

== See also ==
- Mizrahi Jews
- Sephardi Jews
  - Maghrebi Jews
- History of the Jews under Muslim rule
  - Jewish exodus from the Muslim world
- History of the Jews in the Arabian Peninsula
  - Jewish tribes of Arabia
  - History of the Jews in Bahrain
  - History of the Jews in Kuwait
  - History of the Jews in Oman
  - History of the Jews in Qatar
  - History of the Jews in Saudi Arabia
  - History of the Jews in the United Arab Emirates
  - History of the Jews in Yemen
- History of the Jews in Algeria
- History of the Jews in Djibouti
- History of the Jews in Egypt
- History of the Jews in Iraq
- History of the Jews in Jordan
- History of the Jews in Lebanon
- History of the Jews in Libya
- History of the Jews in Morocco
- History of the Jews in Somalia
- History of the Jews in Sudan
- History of the Jews in Syria
- History of the Jews in Tunisia
