= History of the Jews in Qatar =

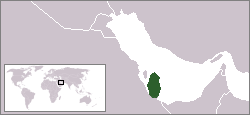
Geographic location of Qatar

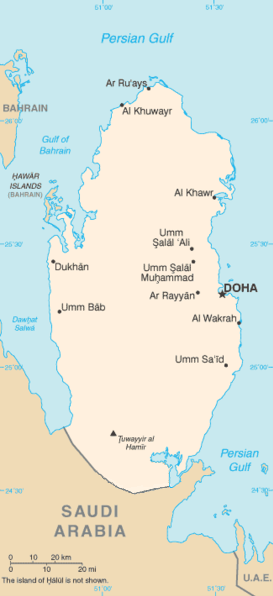
Map of Qatar

The history of the Jews in Qatar is relatively limited unlike some of the neighboring countries in the Persian Gulf.

In modern times, a small expatriate Jewish community has developed, principally in Doha. Rabbi Eliyahu Chitrik serves the community and Jewish visitors to Qatar and was described in 2026 reports as Qatar’s chief rabbi.

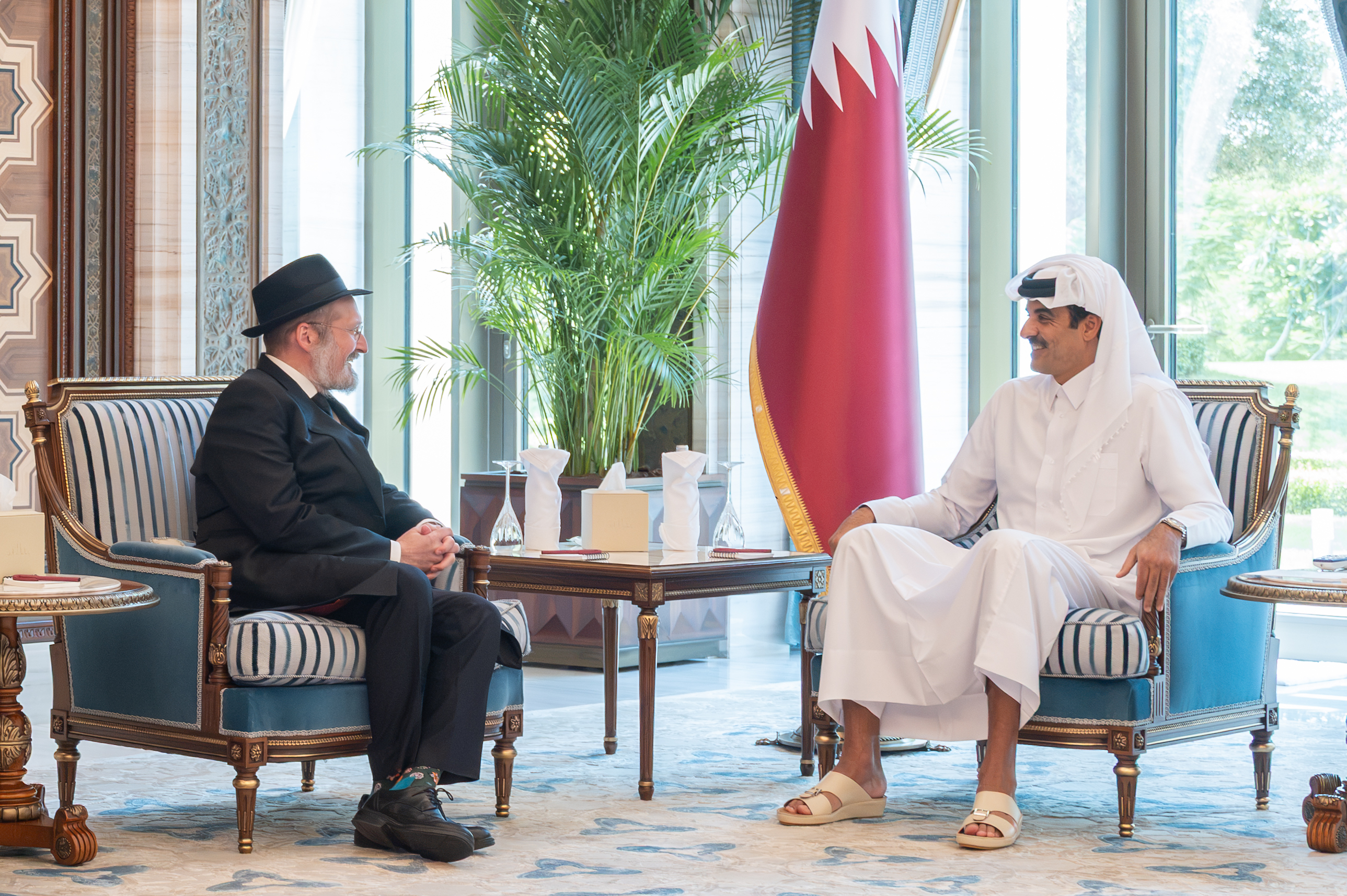

== Jews and Judaism in Qatar ==
In 2005 Qatar University with the Qatari Ministry of Foreign Affairs invited a Jewish delegation from Israel to take part in an international conference on religious dialogue despite opposition from some quarters. It was the first time that Jewish scholars attended the International Conference on Religious Dialogue held every year in Qatar.

Various Jewish people visit and live in Qatar. Professor Gary Wasserman wrote a book The Doha Experiment: Arab Kingdom, Catholic College, Jewish Teacher describing his stay teaching and working in Qatar where Wasserman encountered barely any personal animosity due to being Jewish.

In 2013 Qatar assisted Yemenite Jews to move to Israel. The first group of Yemenite Jews departed from Doha on Qatari flights and arrived in Tel Aviv's Ben Gurion International Airport.

A significant sign of Qatar's new openness to outsiders that includes Jews was that over 10,000 Israelis and many other Jews visited for the 2022 FIFA World Cup, many of whom were provided with tens of thousands of Kosher meals showing that there is official recognition and permission to practice Judaism. As early as 2019 it was reported that Qatari officials had consulted with American Rabbi Marc Schneier as to how to welcome the thousands of Israelis and Jews who intended to attend the world Cup finals in 2022.

In 2021 the Association of Gulf Jewish Communities was established to serve Jewish populations in Bahrain, Kuwait, Oman, Qatar, Saudi Arabia and the United Arab Emirates. A 2023 report by the United States Department of State stated that during Ramadan the US ambassador hosted an interfaith Suhur (morning meal before sunrise or after the fast-breaking evening meal during Ramadan) bringing together Muslim, Christian, and Jewish representatives and in September, the US embassy helped facilitate the visit of a rabbi who conducted Jewish religious services. In a strange twist, rabbis from the anti-Zionist Jewish movement Neturei Karta attended the funeral of Hamas political bureau chief Ismail Haniyeh in the Qatari capital Doha in 2024.

Some reports suggest that Qatar's recent official benevolence and tolerance of Jews and Judaism inside Qatar itself is aimed at easing its political isolation and improving its own image by reaching out to American Jews. Qatar's efforts to reach out to wealthy and influential American Jews was reported by Axios in 2023: "Jared Kushner and Ivanka Trump organized a private meeting in New York last Wednesday with Qatar's prime minister and a bipartisan group mostly of Jewish businessmen and billionaires, three sources with direct knowledge of the meeting tell Axios."

In a 2023 report by the Board of Deputies of British Jews a delegation of World Jewish Congress officials, led by its president Ronald Lauder, engaged in discussions with leaders in Qatar. During these high-level meetings the concerns of global Jewry regarding the plight of Israeli hostages in Gaza were expressed seeking the intervention of Arab leaders to secure the release of the Israeli hostages.

On 27 July 2026, Emir Tamim bin Hamad Al Thani received a delegation from the Alliance of Rabbis in Islamic States, led by its chairman Rabbi Mendy Chitrik, Chief Rabbi Yehuda Gerami of Iran and others at Lusail Palace. The delegation included Rabbi Eliyahu Chitrik, who was described in contemporary reports as Qatar’s chief rabbi. Following the meeting, The National reported that the Emir’s support had enabled Chitrik to serve Qatar’s Jewish community and Jewish visitors to the country.

== Qatar and accusations of Antisemitism ==
Antisemitism is rife in many areas of life in Qatar, alongside Kuwait, Oman, Malaysia and other Arab and Muslim countries as well as fostering antisemitism beyond its borders. The media giant Al Jazeera is based in Qatar and has frequently been accused of fostering and spouting antisemitism. Antisemitic cartoons appear often in Qatari newspapers and school books. The United States Department of State has found persistent antisemitism in Qatari school textbooks such as that Jews seek world domination. Some writers have called for a cut-off of funding to American colleges by Qatar, Saudi Arabia, Kuwait and other wealthy Arab and Muslim countries because the multimillion-dollar donations to Middle Eastern studies centers and departments have advanced Islamist ideology and fostered Jew-hatred at U.S. universities.

Qatar has allegedly supplied money for antisemitic activists and activism against Jewish students and Jewish interests on American college and university campuses. Some American politicians have spoken out against the antisemitic outcomes of Qatari funding of US institutions, such as Representative Jack Bergman, who has stated that: "For years, the Qatar Foundation philanthropies and the Qatar Investment Authority have played a key role in the organization and funding of the radical antisemitic Boycott, Divestment and Sanctions movement on U.S. college campuses. Since 2017, Qatar has hired at least 100 different firms for lobbying and public relations, according to the Foreign Agents Registration Act database. Qatar has also lavished tens of millions of dollars on nonprofit Washington think tanks, including the Brookings Institution. And Qatar has given over $5 billion to U.S. universities, according to records published by the U.S. Department of Education."

=== In media and culture ===
In 2016 the Simon Wiesenthal Center objected to the continued display of titles inciting to hatred of Jews at the Doha International Book Fair. A 2024 first ever Web Summit Qatar bringing together thousands of investors and startups was also tainted with antisemitism due to a large number of investors and tech experts advertised as speaking at the Doha conference who are on record of promoting antisemitic tropes.

In April 2019, Al Raya, a semi-official daily newspaper, published an article stating that "The Zionist movement managed to establish the 'Holocaust culture' in Western political ethics and morally forced it on European societies." The article described the Holocaust as "alleged" and placed the survivors in quotation marks.

In 2019, the US Charge d'Affaires in Qatar and embassy staff met with Qatari officials from the Ministry of Foreign Affairs and with media organizations, including Al Jazeera, to address antisemitic content in publications and broadcasts. They urged the removal of offensive material and sought to prevent antisemitic depictions at events such as the Doha International Book Fair.

=== In education ===
According to reporting by The Sunday Telegraph in 2026, some state-approved textbooks used in international schools in Qatar contained content that omitted explicit reference to the Holocaust while discussing Nazi Germany and World War II. In the 2025 editions examined, a Grade 12 history textbook encouraged students to read Mein Kampf and referred vaguely to Hitler’s "racist ideas."

The reporting also described antisemitic content in Islamic education textbooks. One text, used for students around age 13, reportedly described Jews as "evil" for rejecting Islam during its rise in the 7th century, stating: "The Children of Israel described the Holy Quran as blatant magic. There is no one more evil, or misguided, than one who turns away from Islam." Another Islamic education textbook for older pupils reportedly taught that the region of Palestine is an "Arab and Islamic land" that should not be ceded in any part, encouraged efforts toward its "liberation," and instructed students to oppose peace with Israel.

The Sunday Telegraph also reported anecdotal accounts from teachers, including one who said she had to remove the word "Jew" from children's Western fiction textbooks and that some Arabic students would "glorify" Hitler in their work. The teacher added: "We are not allowed to mention Jews. The genocide didn't happen to them. It is like brainwashing. Israel does not exist over there. To suggest it does would get you in a lot of trouble. Parents or teachers would call the police."

Following these reports, the UK-based NGO Campaign Against Antisemitism described the material as "outrageous" and called for the schools to withdraw from Qatar.

== Forum on US-Islamic relations ==
As an indication of the opening up of Qatari society to western influence and giving appropriate attention to the Jewish population, the Jewish Telegraphic Agency reported in December 2003 that a forum on U.S.-Islamic relations in Qatar would feature both Israeli and U.S. Jewish participants. Former president Clinton and Sheikh Hamad Bin Khalifa Al-Thani, the emir of Qatar, were the scheduled keynote speakers at the 2004 US-Islamic Forum in Doha. The forum was sponsored by the Project on US Policy Towards the Islamic World and funded by the Saban Center, founded by American-Israeli entertainment mogul Haim Saban. Participants came from predominantly Islamic countries, including Syria, Saudi Arabia, and Sudan. Martin Kramer, the editor of the Middle East Quarterly, was the sole Israeli participant since Saban and attended as an American.

== Jewish-American soldiers ==
A news report that described the preparations for U.S. troops stationed in Qatar:

The Jewish members of America's armed forces will again receive kosher K-rations this Pesach throughout the holiday, provided by the U.S. Defense Department.

Thousands of packages containing kosher for Pesach MREs (meals ready to eat) have already reached U.S. army and navy supply bases, with special shipments aimed at Jewish troops in Iraq and Afghanistan...

The Jewish Chaplains Council estimates that the number of Jews stationed in Iraq is between 500 and 600. Of the 30 Jewish chaplains on active duty worldwide, eight chaplains are stationed in Iraq, including two female rabbis.

Each chaplain stationed in Iraq will hold two seders at base camps, with central seders in Baghdad, Falluja, and Tikrit. There will also be two seders at the army headquarters in Bahrain, and air force headquarters in Qatar. Jewish soldiers stationed in remote locations will be able to attend seders led by soldiers who received special training for that purpose.

== Diplomatic openings ==
In 2007 a report stated,

Arab states, led by Saudi Arabia, are making some of their most public overtures ever to Israel and American Jews to undercut Iran's growing influence, contain violence in Iraq and Lebanon and push for a Palestinian solution...Saudi Arabia, Qatar, and the United Arab Emirates have stepped up contacts with Israel and pro-Israel Jewish groups in the USA. The outreach has the Bush administration's blessing: Secretary of State Condoleezza Rice has said six Persian Gulf states and Egypt, Jordan, and Israel are a new alignment of moderates to oppose extremists backed by Iran and Syria. She has said an Israeli-Palestinian peace deal would weaken militants such as Hamas and Hezbollah...Saudi and Gulf Arab contacts with Israelis and American Jews go back more than a decade but have never been so public. Arab countries have treated Israel as a pariah since it gained independence in 1948. Most Arab countries ban travel to Israel, investment there, and other commercial ties with the Jewish state and routinely refer to it as the "Zionist entity." ...Among the other recent Arab-Jewish contacts: Saudi national security adviser Bandar bin Sultan met privately with Israeli prime minister Ehud Olmert in Jordan in September, said Daniel Ayalon, Israel's former ambassador to Washington. He said it was the highest-level Saudi-Israeli meeting he'd ever heard of. The United Arab Emirates has invited a delegation from the Conference of Presidents of Major American Jewish Organizations. The conference, a 51-member umbrella group, is a strong supporter of Israel. Israeli deputy prime minister Shimon Peres met the emir of Qatar in late January after taking part in a debate with Arab students there. It was the highest-level Israeli meeting with the Persian Gulf nation since 1996 when Peres visited as prime minister."

== Jews in the Arabian Peninsula ==
- History of the Jews in Iraq
- History of the Jews in Jordan
- History of the Jews in Bahrain
- History of the Jews in Kuwait
- History of the Jews in Oman
- History of the Jews in Saudi Arabia
- History of the Jews in the United Arab Emirates
- Yemenite Jews

== See also ==
- Abrahamic religion
- Arab Jews
- Arab states of the Persian Gulf
- Babylonian captivity
- History of the Jews in the Arabian Peninsula
- History of the Jews under Muslim rule
- Islam and antisemitism
- Jewish exodus from Arab lands
- Jews outside Europe under Nazi occupation
- Judaism and Islam
- List of Jews from the Arab World
- Mizrahi Jews
- Israel-Qatar relations
- Law of Return
