= History of the Jews in Jordan =

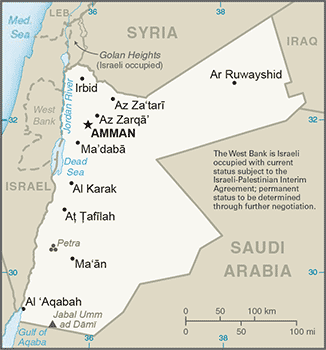
Map of Jordan

The history of the Jews in Jordan can be traced back to Biblical times. Presently, there are no legal restrictions on Jews in Jordan, and they are permitted to own property and conduct business in the country, but in 2006 there were reported to be no Jewish citizens of Jordan, nor any synagogues or other Jewish institutions.

== Israelite tribes ==
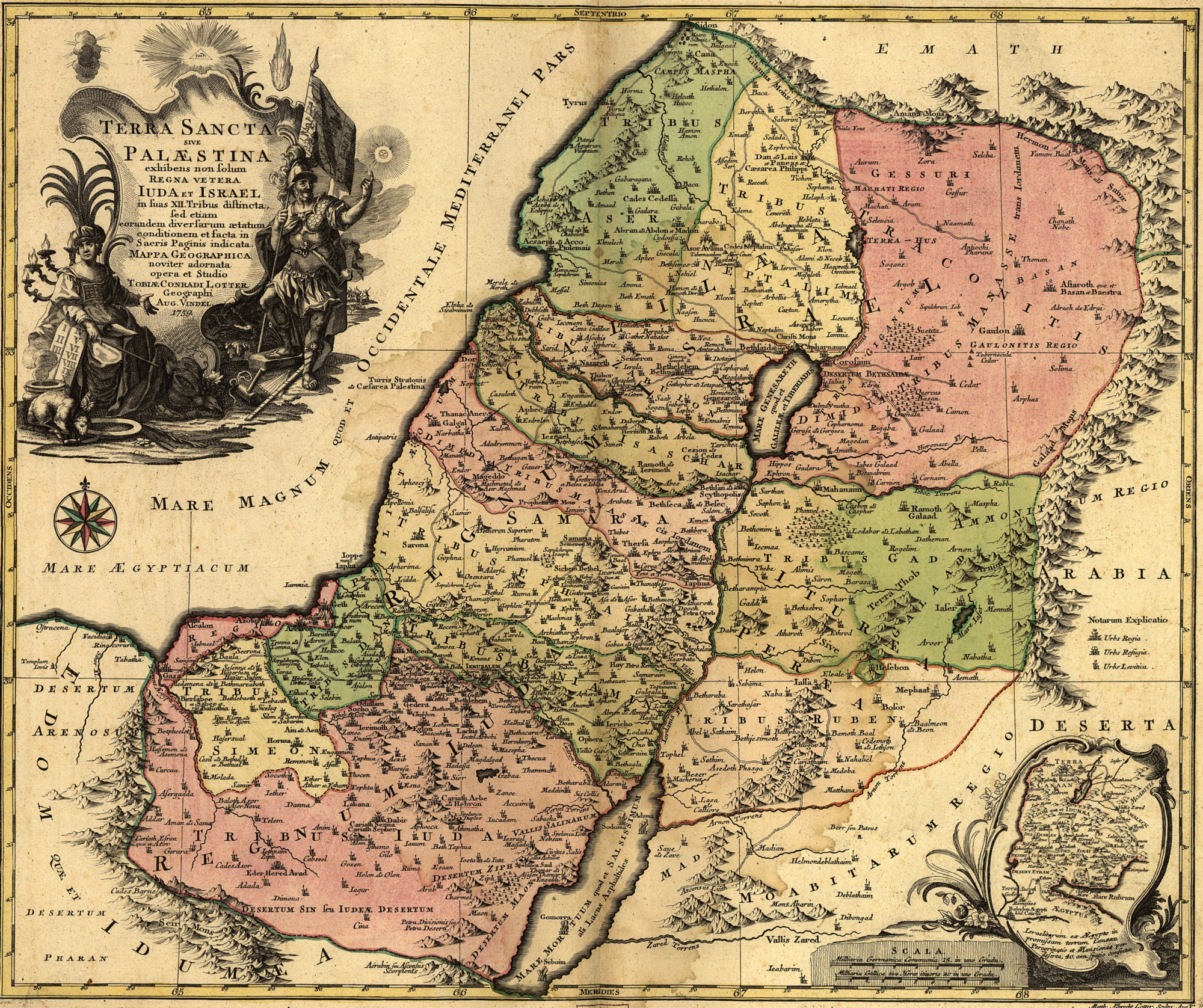
1759 map of the initial tribal allocations - Actual tribal territories during the United Monarchy and afterwards were somewhat different.

According to the Hebrew Bible, three of the ancient Israelite tribes were allocated lands on the east side of the Jordan River valley, in the territory of present-day Jordan. They were the tribes of Reuben, Gad and Manasseh. The northwestern Transjordan, known as Gilead, was inhabited by Israelites and became a contested region between the Kingdom of Israel and the Kingdom of Aram-Damascus. The northern Kingdom of Israel was conquered by the Neo-Assyrian Empire in the late 8th century BCE, and the Israelite population in the Transjordan was deported.

== Hellenistic and Hasmonean periods ==
A nation related to the Israelites, the Edomites (Idumaeans) resided during the Iron Age in present-day southern Jordan, between the Dead Sea and the Gulf of Aqaba. In classical antiquity, they migrated westward into southern Judea, which became known as Idumaea. In the late 2nd century BCE, the Idumaeans were conquered by the Hasmonean ruler John Hyrcanus, who subsequently converted them to Judaism.

In the early 80s BCE, Hasmonean king Alexander Jannaeus of Judaea besieged and captured the city of Gerasa. Archaeological evidence suggests that public buildings in Gerasa may have been destroyed during this period, possibly as a result of the conquest.

Antipater the Idumaean, a Hasmonean official of Idumean origin, was the founder of the Herodian dynasty that came to rule Judea following the Roman conquest. His son, Herod the Great, was appointed king of Judaea by the Romans. During Herod's reign, Idumaea was governed on his behalf by a succession of appointed officials, including his brother Joseph Antipater and his brother-in-law Costobarus. Immediately before the siege of Jerusalem by Titus, 20,000 Idumaeans, under the leadership of John, Simeon, Phinehas, and Jacob, appeared before Jerusalem to fight on behalf of the zealots who were besieged in the Second Temple. After the Jewish–Roman wars, the Idumaean people ceased to be mentioned in history.

== Roman era ==
Roman rule in the region began in 63 BCE, when the general Pompey declared Judea a Roman protectorate. Over the years, Roman power over the Judean kingdom increased. Among the voices of opposition were John the Baptist, whose severed head was allegedly presented at the fortress of Machaerus to Herod.

=== First Jewish–Roman war (66–73 CE) ===
During the First Jewish Revolt against Roman rule, the conflict extended into Transjordan. Early in the uprising, Jewish rebels seized the strategic fortress of Machaerus. During the same year, several mixed cities in the region witnessed violent outbreaks against their Jewish communities. In Gadara, local non-Jews rose up against Jews, resulting in the execution or imprisonment of many. In contrast, in Gerasa, non-Jewish residents reportedly escorted departing Jews safely to the city's border. News of the massacres triggered retaliatory attacks by Jewish groups on Philadelphia (Amman), Heshbon, Gerasa and Pella. Archaeological layers showing destruction at both Gerasa and Gadara confirm the regional unrest during this period. Among the notable Jewish commanders during the revolt was Niger the Perean, who had distinguished himself in the successful defense against the Roman governor Cestius Gallus in 66 CE. He was later appointed by the provisional government in Jerusalem to oversee military operations in Idumaea, while Perea was placed under the command of a leader named Manasseh.

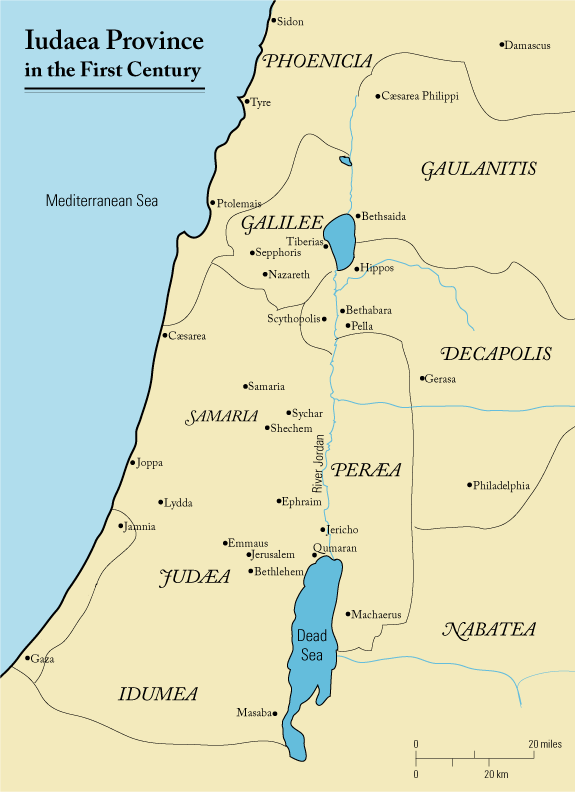
Iudaea Province on both sides of the Jordan River in the 1st century.

Perea saw further fighting during the Roman counteroffensive led by Vespasian. In January 68 CE, the leaders of Gadara sent envoys to Vespasian offering to surrender the city. However, internal dissent led to the assassination of a prominent pro-surrender citizen, after which the remaining residents dismantled the city's fortifications, allowing Roman troops to establish a garrison. Meanwhile, rebel elements regrouped in nearby Bethennabris (Beth-nimrah) but were defeated by Roman forces. Survivors attempting to flee to Jericho were ambushed near the Jordan River; over 15,000 were reportedly killed, drowned, or captured.

After the fall of Jerusalem to Titus in 70 CE, Roman commanders resumed operations in Perea to eliminate remaining resistance. In 71 CE, Lucilius Bassus, now leading the Roman forces, crossed the Jordan River to besiege Machaerus. He constructed a circumvallation wall, siege camps, and a partial assault ramp, remnants of which remain visible today. The siege ended when Eleazar, a young man from a prominent Jewish family, was captured and prepared for crucifixion in sight of the defenders. This act compelled the rebels to surrender in exchange for safe passage. Bassus then pursued surviving rebels, including a faction led by Judah ben Ari, who had taken refuge in the forest of Jardes (possibly identifiable with Wadi Mujib or another lush valley in Moab). Roman cavalry surrounded the area while infantry cleared trees and overpowered the defenders, reportedly killing approximately 3,000 rebels.

=== Bar Kokhba revolt (132–136 CE) ===
During the Bar Kokhba revolt, the last major Jewish uprising against Roman rule in Judaea, the Jews of Perea appear to have also participated in the rebellion. Though the revolt was primarily concentrated in the region of Judea (with the Roman suppression causing mass destruction an displacement, nearly depopulating the district from Jews), archaeological evidence indicates that Jewish settlements in Perea were affected too during this period. Excavations at early 2nd-century sites such as Tel Abu al-Sarbut (in the Sukkoth Valley), al-Mukhayyat, and Callirrhoe reveal destruction and abandonment layers consistent with violent conflict or forced displacement linked to the revolt. A papyrus dated to 151 CE names a Roman veteran from Meason in Perea, suggesting possible land confiscation as part of punitive Roman policies. In addition, a 2nd-century inscription of the Sixth Legion at As-Salt (ancient Gadara) and the construction of Roman fortifications in the Jordan Valley, oriented toward northern Perea, reflect a Roman military presence likely aimed at suppressing and deterring Jewish resistance in the region. In the aftermath of the revolt, the Roman authorities renamed the province of Judaea to Syria Palaestina.

=== Late antiquity ===
A series of excavation surveys conducted in Zoara in 1986-1996 uncovered gravestones inscribed in Aramaic, suggesting that they belong to Jewish burials. Of these, two inscriptions reveal the origins of the deceased as being Jews that hailed from Ḥimyar (now Yemen) and are funerary inscriptions dating back to 470 and 477 A.D., written in the combined Hebrew, Aramaic and Sabaean scripts. These gravestones have all been traced back to the fourth-fifth centuries A.D., when Zoara was an important Jewish center. Unusually, Christians and Jews were buried in the same cemetery.

Over the centuries, the Jewish population within present-day Jordan gradually declined, until no Jews were left.

== Late Ottoman period ==
In 1896, the Ottoman governor of the Karak region, Hilmi Pasha, invited Shabtai Hizkiya, one of the first settlers of Hartuv, and offered him land to purchase for the purpose of establishing a Jewish colony near the city.

The Ottoman authorities were asked to allocate land free of charge to 600 Jewish families from Bulgaria who were to settle in the settlement nucleus about four kilometers from the city.

In 1900, Abraham Moses Luncz's Eretz Yisrael calendar reported that there were 12 Jewish artists residing in the city without their families. Yitzhak Ben-Zvi wrote that in the 1920s, one Jewish family lived in Karak, but by the 1930s, there were no Jews in the city.

== British Mandate ==
The British Balfour Declaration endorsed the idea of a Jewish homeland in Palestine, though its borders were not defined. Boundaries for a British Mandate for Palestine were proposed by the World Zionist Organization to the Paris Peace Conference of 1919:

"The fertile plains east of the Jordan, since the earliest Biblical times, have been linked economically and politically with the land west of the Jordan. The country which is now very sparsely populated, in Roman times supported a great population. It could now serve admirably for colonisation on a large scale. A just regard for the economic needs of Palestine and Arabia demands that free access to the Hedjaz Railway throughout its length be accorded both Governments."

Notwithstanding the wishes of the WZO, the British administration from as early as 1917 treated territory east of the Jordan River, known as Transjordan, separately, and saw it as a separate future state. A formal restriction of the Jewish homeland to west of the Jordan was announced at the Cairo conference in March 1921, and a new article was added to the draft mandate text allowing the British government to administer Transjordan separately. The mandate was approved by the League of Nations in July 1922, and in September 1922 the League approved a memorandum spelling out in detail the exclusion of Transjordan from the Jewish homeland provisions.

The only formally approved presence of Jews in Transjordan was in the late 1920s. In 1927, Pinchas Rutenberg, founder of the Palestine Electric Company, signed an agreement with the Emir of Transjordan Abdullah I to build a hydroelectric power station on Transjordan territory. Construction of the Naharayim hydroelectric power plant began in 1928. Tel Or was built near the power plant to house the permanent employees and their families. Tel Or was settled in 1930 and was the only Jewish village in Transjordan at the time. Residents also farmed thousands of dunams of land and sold some of the produce at a company workers’ supermarket in Haifa. The town lasted until its depopulation in 1948 during the Arab–Israeli War, when it was overrun by Iraqi and Transjordanian forces and destroyed.

== Jordan relations with Israel ==
Jordan was not a member of the United Nations when the vote on the United Nations Partition Plan for Palestine of 1947 was taken, but following the establishment of the state of Israel on 14 May 1948, Jordan, then known as Transjordan, was one of the Arab League countries that immediately attacked the new country, precipitating the 1948 Arab–Israeli War. By war's end, it had control of the West Bank and East Jerusalem (including the Old City), and expelled those Jews who remained in the Old City of Jerusalem. An Arab commander remarked: "For the first time in 1,000 years not a single Jew remains in the Jewish Quarter. Not a single building remains intact. This makes the Jews' return here impossible." The Hurva Synagogue, originally built in 1701, was blown up by the Jordanian Arab Legion.

In 1950 Jordan annexed the West Bank and East Jerusalem, and in 1954 granted Jordanian nationality to its non-Jewish residents who had been Palestinian nationals before 15 May 1948. During the nineteen years of Jordanian rule in the West Bank, a third of the Jewish Quarter's buildings were demolished. According to a complaint Israel made to the United Nations, all but one of the thirty-five Jewish houses of worship in the Old City were destroyed. The synagogues were razed or pillaged and stripped and their interiors used as hen-houses or stables.

Jordan lost control of the West Bank during the 1967 Six-Day War, but did not relinquish its claim to the West Bank until 1988, and in 1994 signed the Israel–Jordan peace treaty. The treaty did not change the status of Jews in Jordan, and in 2006 it was reported that there were no Jewish citizens of Jordan, nor any synagogues or other Jewish institutions. Nevertheless, the government does recognize Judaism as a religion and does not impose restrictions on Jews, and Jews are permitted to own property and conduct business in the country, though these may be subject to Jordanian nationality requirements.

== Trade and tourism ==
Jordan has welcomed a number of Israeli companies to open plants in Jordan. Israeli tourists, as well as Jewish citizens of other countries, visit Jordan. In the year following the 1994 Israel–Jordan treaty, some 60,000 to 80,000 Israeli tourists visited Jordan. Expectations of closer relations between the countries led to a proposal to open a kosher restaurant in Amman. With a loss of Arab clientele, failure to secure kosher certification, and lack of interest among tourists, the enterprise failed.

Following the Second Intifada (2000–2005), Israeli tourism to Jordan declined greatly, as a result of anti-Israeli agitation among a wide segment of the population. In August 2008, Jordanian border officials turned back a group of Israeli tourists who were carrying Jewish religious items. According to the guards, the items posed a "security risk," even if used within the privacy of a hotel, and could not be brought into the country. In response, the tour group chose not to enter Jordan. The apparent ban on Jewish worship in Jordan was again enforced in August 2019, after a group of Israeli tourists shared a video of themselves dancing with a Torah scroll at the Tomb of Aaron on Mount Hor near Petra. Jordanian authorities confiscated Jewish religious items from the group and closed the summit to foreign tour groups that do not have permission to visit from the Awqaf Ministry.

Part of the 1994 peace treaty restored political control of the 500-acre Tzofar farm fields in the Arava valley to Jordan, but Israel rented the land so that Israeli workers from the moshav could continue to cultivate it. This area was not subject to customs or immigration legislation. The treaty preserved this arrangement for 25 years, with automatic renewal unless either country terminates the arrangement. The 25-year lease ended in October 2019, after the Jordanian government gave the requisite one-year notice.

The Island of Peace at the confluence of the Yarmouk and Jordan Rivers operated under a similar agreement allowing Israeli usage under Jordanian sovereignty. This lease ended on November 10, 2019.

== Jews in the Arabian Peninsula ==
- History of the Jews in Iraq
- History of the Jews in Bahrain
- History of the Jews in Kuwait
- History of the Jews in Oman
- History of the Jews in Qatar
- History of the Jews in Saudi Arabia
- History of the Jews in the United Arab Emirates
- Yemenite Jews

== See also ==
- Abrahamic religion
- Arab Jews
- Arab states of the Persian Gulf
- Babylonian captivity
- History of the Jews in the Arabian Peninsula
- Jewish exodus from Arab lands
- List of Jews from the Arab World
- Mizrahi Jews
- Transjordan (Bible)
- Israel–Jordan relations
- Island of Peace massacre
