= History of the Jews in Oman =

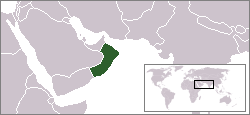
Geographic location of Oman

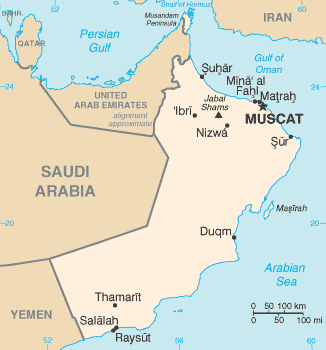
Map of Oman

The history of the Jews in Oman reaches back to the 800s. There was a Jewish presence in Oman for many centuries; however, the Jewish community of the country is no longer in existence.

== Ishaq bin Yahuda ==
The documented Omani Jewish community was made famous by Ishaq bin Yahuda, a merchant who lived in the 9th century. Bin Yahuda lived in Sohar, and sailed for China between the years of 882 and 912 after an argument with a Jewish colleague, where he made a great fortune. He returned to Sohar and sailed for China again, but his ship was seized and bin Yahuda was murdered at the port of Sumatra.

== Benjamin of Tudela visits Muscat ==
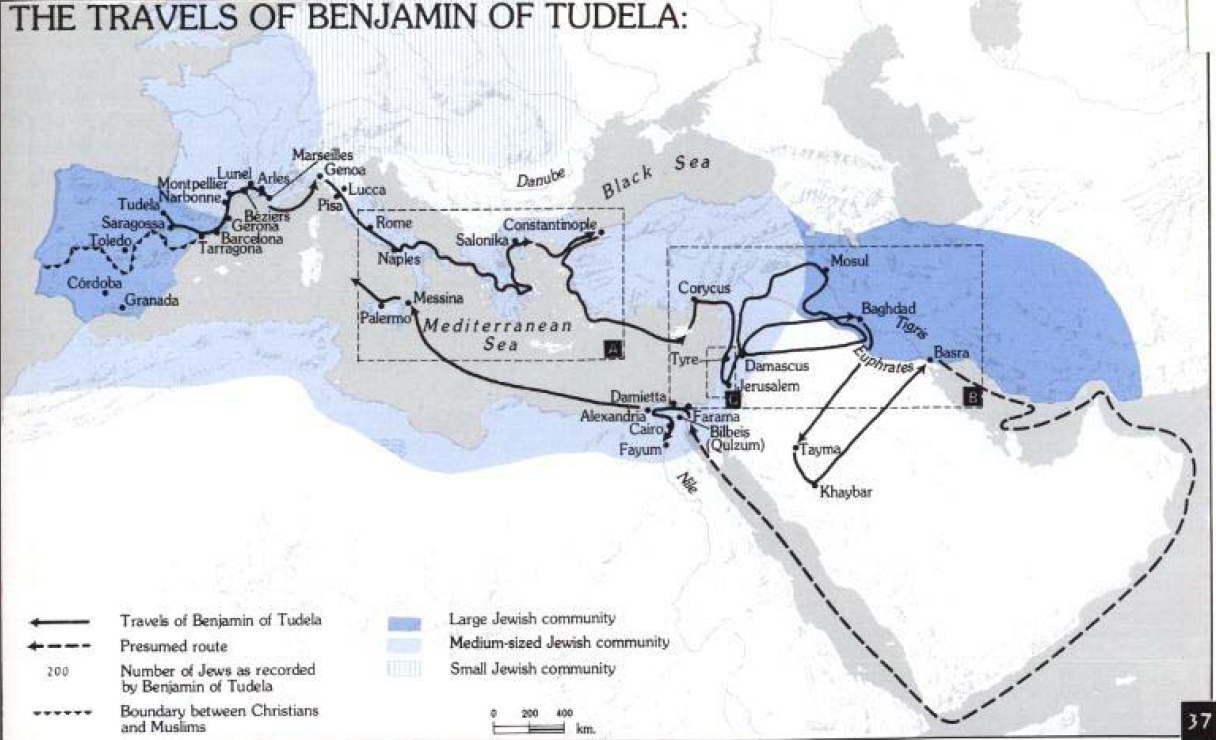
Map of the route.

A historical journey to visit far-flung Jewish communities was undertaken by Rabbi Benjamin of Tudela from 1165 to 1173 that crossed and tracked some of the areas that are today in the geographic area of Oman. His trek began as a pilgrimage to the Holy Land. He may have hoped to settle there, but there is controversy about the reasons for his travels. It has been suggested he may have had a commercial motive as well as a religious one. On the other hand, he may have intended to catalogue the Jewish communities on the route to the Holy Land so as to provide a guide to where hospitality may have been found for Jews travelling to the Holy Land. He took the "long road" stopping frequently, meeting people, visiting places, describing occupations and giving a demographic count of Jews in every town and country.

One of the known towns that Benjamin of Tudela reported as having a Jewish community was Muscat located in the area of Oman in the northern part of the Arabian Peninsula.

== Later community ==
In the mid-19th century, the British Lieutenant James Raymond Wellsted documented the Jews of Muscat in his memoirs Travels in Arabia, vol. 1. He mentions that there are "a few Jews in Muskat (sic), who mostly arrived there in 1828, being driven from Baghdad...by the cruelties and extortions of the Pacha Daud." He also notes that Jews were not discriminated against at all in Oman, which was not the case in other Arab countries (they did not have to live in Ghettos, nor identify themselves as Jews, not walk in the road if a Muslim was walking on the same street, as was the case in Yemen). The Jews of Muscat were employed mostly in the making of silver ornaments, banking, and liquor sale. Despite the lack of persecution in Oman, the community is believed to have disappeared before 1900. During World War II, a Jewish American Army enlisted man, Emanuel Glick, encountered a small community of Omani Jews in Muscat, but this community consisted mostly of recent migrants from Yemen. In 1831, Edwin Stocqueler travelled to Muscat and took up quarters at the house of Reuben Aslan, a Jew agent for the Bombay government (Fifteen Months Pilgrimage, vol. 1, p.3). In the same passage, Stocqueler praised the Imam of Muscat for his tolerance of the religions of other nations.

== Modern politics ==
Omani officials have begun to reach out to Jewish American and Israeli leaders. In 2008, the American Jewish Committee hosted a meeting at which: "Israeli and Omani leaders gathered at AJC to celebrate the tenth anniversary of the Middle East Desalination Research Center, one of the success stories of efforts to deepen Arab-Israeli cooperation. Speakers include Sayyid Badr, secretary-general of the Foreign Ministry of Oman; Israeli Foreign Minister Tzipi Livni; and Charles Lawson of the U.S. State Department. (Video: Israeli, Omani Leaders Celebrate.)

== Jews in the Arabian Peninsula ==
- History of the Jews in Iraq
- History of the Jews in Jordan
- History of the Jews in Bahrain
- History of the Jews in Kuwait
- History of the Jews in Qatar
- History of the Jews in Saudi Arabia
- History of the Jews in the United Arab Emirates
- Yemenite Jews

== See also ==
- History of Oman
- Oman-Israel Relations
- Abrahamic religion
- Arab Jews
- Arab states of the Persian Gulf
- Babylonian captivity
- History of the Jews in the Arabian Peninsula
- History of the Jews under Muslim rule
- Jewish exodus from the Muslim world
- Jews outside Europe under Axis occupation
- List of Jews from the Arab World
- Mizrahi Jews
