= Berdugo =

Berdugo is a surname. Notable people with the surname include:

- Diego Dionisio de Peñalosa Briceño y Berdugo (1621–1687), governor of Spanish New Mexico
- Fulgencio Berdugo (1918–2003), Colombian footballer
- Gabriel Berdugo (born 1947), Colombian footballer
- Yaakov Bardugo (born 1965), Israeli presenter and political commentator.
- Raphael Berdugo (1747–1821), Moroccan rabbi
- Salomon Berdugo (1854–1906), Moroccan rabbi
- Serge Berdugo (born 1938), Moroccan lawyer and politician
