= History of the Jews in Kuwait =

The history of the Jews in Kuwait is closely connected to the history of the Jews in Iraq.

== History ==
The noted British businessman Naim Dangoor was an Iraqi Jewish exile whose grandfather was the chief rabbi in Baghdad. He came to Britain in the 1930s to study engineering at Queen Mary College in London and returned to Iraq to join the army and then set up his business empire. He spent the 1950s running the Coca-Cola franchise in Iraq with a beloved Muslim business partner. He states that:

In 1776 Sadeq Khan Zand captured Basra, many of the inhabitants left the country and among them were Jews who went to Kuwait. Around 1860, their number increased and their trade flourished. The Jews had a market called "The Jews' market ", which was next to the market Mosque. It was known that the Jews used to make alcohol and sell it to the public. The Jews were known to be very careful with trading. They were mostly wholesalers and worked with India - Baghdad and Aleppo. They even exported to Europe and China. There were about 80 Jewish families in Kuwait living in one district where the Bank of Trade is now. The Jews used to wear long gown (Zboun) and Fez which made them look different from the others. Some used to wear European suits but they covered their head with Fez. They had their own Synagogue with their Sefer Torah. In the Synagogue, they had separate place for the women. Saturday is a sacred day. Jews didn't work that day. They also had their own cemetery which shows that they lived there for a long time. Before 1914 there were about 200 Jews. Most of them went back to Baghdad and few went to India. There were two wealthy Jews in Kuwait but the rest were middle class, being Jewellers or material traders. Among the wealthy Jews were Saleh Mahlab who owned the first ice factory in 1912, which he later sold to the Arms Trader and Merchant Mohammed-Ali bin Haidar Marafi. Gurgi Sasson and Menashi Eliahou who were traders and financiers. When Sheikh Salem al Mubarak came to power in February 1917 (he was the 9th ruler). He wanted to stop the Jews from dealing with alcoholic spirits. He called them and warned them. There is no evidence that they were kicked out of Kuwait. The truth is that they went back to Iraq when King Faisal the first came to rule Iraq. The King had Jewish acquaintances like Wiseman and Sasson Heskel who became the Minister of Finance in Iraq. During the twenties, all the Jews left Kuwait.

Professor Faisal Abdulla Alkanderi of Kuwait corroborates the above in his essay in Islam and Christian-Muslim Relations, 2006, as summarized:

Kuwait in the last decades of the nineteenth century had become a dynamic place for its time. There was a building boom in both houses and ships, and business opportunities abounded. The country was peaceful and stable. The combination of services available and economic prospects drew people from surrounding countries searching for a better life. This article deals with the little-known Jewish community that began to come to Kuwait during that time. It also discusses the possible reasons why they left. These Jews belonged to the 'Babylonian' Jews who had lived in Mesopotamia for millennia. Their language was Arabic, and they had traded between Baghdad and India for centuries. The majority were involved in textiles, and they had their own market where people of all origins came to buy the cloth they imported. They usually educated their children in their synagogue. It was a community in flux, with constant comings and goings, rather than a stable group who arrived together and left together, and it was made up of diverse individuals.

Today, the Avraham Society claims to represent all Kuwaiti Jews, stating on their website that they are a "modern Humanistic and Cultural initiative that is based on and representing the Jewish Community of Kuwait in all its denominations."

== Notable individuals ==
- Saleh and Daoud Al-Kuwaity were famous Kuwaiti Jewish musicians born in Kuwait.

There have also been some Kuwaitis converting to Judaism, such as Yousef Al-Mhanna (Hebrew name: Naftali Benya), Ibtisam Hamid (Hebrew name: Basma Al-Kuwaiti) and Mark Halawa.

== See also ==
- Abrahamic religion
- Arab Jews
- Arab states of the Persian Gulf
- Babylonian captivity
- History of the Jews in the Arabian Peninsula
- History of the Jews under Muslim rule
- Islam and antisemitism
- Jewish exodus from the Muslim world
- Jews outside Europe under Axis occupation
- Judaism and Islam
- List of Jews from the Arab World
- Mizrahi Jews

=== Jews in the Arab world ===
- History of the Jews in Iraq
- History of the Jews in Bahrain
- History of the Jews in Oman
- Yemenite Jews
- History of Jews in Saudi Arabia
- History of the Jews in Qatar
- History of the Jews in the United Arab Emirates
