= Israel–Qatar relations =

- Israel: Qatar

Qatar established unofficial trade relations with the State of Israel in 1996, the second amongst all nations of the Arabian Peninsula after Oman reportedly did, concurrently with Israel–Jordan peace treaty. Qatar severed trade relations with Israel in 2009 following the Gaza War.

On September 9, 2025, Israel carried out an airstrike in the Qatari capital Doha, targeting residential buildings housing senior Hamas negotiators who were working on a ceasefire agreement to end the Gaza war. The attack killed 6 people, including Lance Corporal Bader Saad Mohammed Al Humaidi Al Dosari, a Qatari security official.

== Diplomatic relations ==
Following the 2008–2009 Israel–Gaza conflict, Qatar hosted an emergency conference of Arab states and Iran to discuss the conflict. The Hamas administration in Gaza, as opposed to the Fatah-controlled Palestinian Authority in the West Bank, represented the Palestinians, undermining support for Palestinian President Mahmoud Abbas. Khalid Meshaal, the leader of Hamas, President Bashar al-Assad of Syria, and President Ahmadinejad of Iran urged all Arab states to cut any remaining ties to Israel.

In 2013, Qatar reportedly assisted in an Israeli operation to bring a group of Yemenite Jews to Israel. The claim was made by a Lebanese Arabic newspaper. According to the source, 60 Jews fleeing Yemen were allowed to transition from Doha on a flight to Israel. On 30 April 2013, Qatari Prime Minister Sheikh Hamad bin Jassim al-Thani said that final status agreements with the Palestinians could involve land swaps instead of sticking to the 1967 borders. This was received positively in Israel with Justice Minister Tzipi Livni saying: "This news is very positive. In the tumultuous world around ... it could allow the Palestinians to enter the room and make the needed compromises and it sends a message to the Israeli public that this is not just about us and the Palestinians", adding that "peace between the Palestinians and the Israelis is ... a strategic choice for the Arab states".

Israeli leaders harshly criticized Qatar's diplomatic and financial support of Hamas in the wake of 2014 Gaza War, accusing the Qataris of being major sponsors of terrorism. Foreign Minister Avigdor Lieberman called for the banishment of Qatar-based Al Jazeera journalists from Israel.

On 9 March 2015, Qatar's ambassador to Gaza reportedly sought direct approval from Israel to import construction material into the Gaza Strip after Egypt had refused to allow the Qatari delegation through the Rafah border crossing. The Palestinian Authority and Fatah lashed out at Qatar, condemning their efforts to engage in direct communication with Israel. Jihad Harb, a political analyst and author, claimed that Qatar "might assume the role of mediator between Gaza and Israel, thus usurping the roles of the PA and Egypt." In June 2015, the Qatari government facilitated discussions between Israel and Hamas in Doha to discuss a possible five-year ceasefire between the two parties.

In June 2017, Israel backed the Saudi-led bloc of Arab states opposed to Qatar in the 2017 Qatar diplomatic crisis, and announced the expulsion of Qatari state-funded broadcaster Al Jazeera Media Network from Israel. Emirati author Salem Al Ketbi claimed, without due substantiation, that towards the end of the 20th century, Qatar had boycotted some countries that resorted to peace and normalisation of relations with Israel.

During the Gaza war, Qatar mediated between Hamas and Israel. They reached the 2023 Gaza war ceasefire and the exchange of more than 100 Israeli hostages for 240 Palestinian prisoners.

In April 2024, Essa Al-Nassr, a brigadier general at the Emiri Guard and member of the Consultative Assembly of Qatar stated that "there will be no peace nor negotiations with the Zionist entity for one reason: because their mentality does not recognize negotiations, but rather only... breaking promises and lying... They only recognize one thing, which is killings; since they are killers of prophets." He has also referred to the October 7 attacks as a "prelude to the annihilation of the corruption of the 'second Zionist entity' upon earth".

On 19 January 2025, a ceasefire agreement brokered between Israel and Hamas by Qatar, United States and Egypt suspended the Gaza war, involving the release of Israeli hostages and Palestinian prisoners. Israeli opposition leader Yair Lapid commended Qatar's involvement in hostage negotiations with Hamas. On 10 October 2025, another Gaza peace agreement brokered between Israel and Hamas by Qatar, United States, Turkey and Egypt went into effect.

In February 2026, Lapid called on the United States to designate Qatar as a "hostile" or "enemy" state, alleging that Doha had acted in ways that undermine Israeli interests. He linked the call to alleged Qatari influence operations and anti-Israel activity abroad, including in academic and political spheres. Lapid also supported legislative efforts in Israel to formally classify Qatar as an enemy state under Israeli law and urged U.S. lawmakers to adopt a similar designation.

In July 2026, Together party leader and former Prime Minister Naftali Bennett stated that under his leadership, a future Israeli government would formally declare Qatar an enemy state, characterizing the country as a major financier of Hamas and alleging it was responsible for the casualties and abductions during the 7 October attacks. (Note: In the late 2010s and early 2020s, Israeli officials pushed Qatar to back Hamas, particularly by allowing large quantities of financial aid transferred by Qatar to the organization.) He further alleged that Qatar funds Iran's Islamic Revolutionary Guard Corps based on intelligence he received during his premiership, and described the Al Jazeera Media Network as a global influence campaign aimed at undermining Israel. In response, Qatar accused Bennett of spreading falsehoods for political gain, adding that this is not the first time Bennett has attacked Qatar to score political points at home, that the country's activities in Gaza were carried out in full coordination with Israel and had helped secure the release of Israeli hostages, and that the Israeli politicians who criticize Qatar should instead focus on addressing their own domestic challenges.

=== Israeli airstrike on Doha ===
On 9 September 2025, Israel conducted an airstrike on Hamas leadership in Doha, marking the first direct Israeli strike on one of the Gulf Cooperation Council members. Israel dubbed the airstrike as Operation Atzeret HaDin (Hebrew: עצרת הדין, lit. 'Day of Judgment'). The targeted included Hamas negotiators who were working on a settlement mediated by Qatar to end the Gaza war. Qatar condemned the airstrike, calling it a "cowardly Israeli attack" and a violation of international law and sovereignty.

The attack claimed the life of one Qatari security official, Lance Corporal Bader Saad Mohammed Al Humaidi Al Dosari. The airstrike took place at a residential complex on Wadi Rawdan Street in the Leqtaifiya (or West Bay Lagoon) district of Doha. The neighborhood is home to several residential developments, embassies, supermarkets, restaurants, cafeterias and international schools.

Israel had claimed that the airstrike was in response to the 2025 Ramot Junction shooting, which had occurred a day before the shooting where two Palestinian militants opened fire at the Ramot Junction in East Jerusalem, slaying 6 and injuring 21 persons.

The Israeli Air Force deployed 10 fighter jets in the operation, launching more than 10 precision munitions at the intended target.

The airstrike led to Australia's government issuing travel warnings for travelers heading to Qatar, warning that the security situation in the country was 'unpredictable,' a serious alert given that Doha is a major aviation hub, although the airstrike in itself did not lead to any flight disruptions that day at Hamad International Airport.

The office of then-Israeli Prime Minister Benjamin Netanyahu claimed in a post on X that the undertaking was a "wholly independent Israeli operation," adding that "Israel initiated it, Israel conducted it, and Israel takes full responsibility."

On September 29, 2025, during a press conference at the White House, Donald Trump declared that Benjamin Netanyahu had agreed to the Gaza peace plan, and that both leaders, along with the Prime Minister of Qatar, had engaged in a "great" and "productive" conversation. Additionally, the three leaders decided to establish "a formal trilateral mechanism between Israel, Qatar, and the United States to begin a dialogue to enhance mutual security, correct misperceptions, and avoid future misgivings."

On 29 September 2025, Benjamin Netanyahu apologized to Qatari Prime Minister Mohammed bin Abdulrahman al-Thani in a phone call for the violation of Qatar's sovereignty during the recent attack on Doha and the killing of a Qatari security officer. The call took place during Netanyahu's meeting with Donald Trump. According to reports, a formal Israeli apology was one of Qatar's primary conditions for resuming negotiations with Hamas on an agreement to end the Gaza war and secure the release of Israeli hostages.

=== Diplomatic visits ===
Despite Qatar's support of Hamas, Israeli leaders have maintained direct contact with the emirate. In January 2007, in his last months as vice premier, former President Shimon Peres paid a high-profile visit to the capital city of Doha. Peres also visited Qatar in 1996, when he launched the new Israeli trade bureau there.

In January 2008, Israeli Defense Minister Ehud Barak met with former Qatari Prime Minister Sheikh Abdullah bin Khalifa al-Thani in Switzerland, at the World Economic Forum. The existence of the surreptitious talks has so far been kept secretive by Israel.

Foreign Affairs Minister Tzipi Livni also met with the Qatari Emir at a UN conference in 2008. In April 2008, she visited Qatar where she attended a conference and met the Emir, the Prime Minister and the Minister of Oil and Gas. In December 2023, it was announced that Qatar and Israel leaders would be meeting each other in Norway later in the year. In January 2025, Israeli President Isaac Herzog met with Qatari Prime Minister Mohammed bin Abdulrahman Al Thani on the sidelines of the World Economic Forum in Davos and thanked him for Qatari role in securing a hostage deal.

== Cultural relations ==
The Qatar National Olympic Committee and the State of Israel co-funded the Doha Stadium in the Israeli Arab city of Sakhnin located in the Galilee region of Israel. The stadium was named after the Qatari city of Doha. The decision by the Qataris to build the stadium in Israel came after a meeting between the Arab Knesset member Ahmad Tibi and Secretary-General of the Qatar National Olympic Committee Sheikh Saud Abdulrahman Al Thani after Tibi expressed his concern on the conditions for sport in Sakhnin among the Arab society inside Israel. The involvement of Qatar was to show that relations between the two nations are peaceful and with a similar interest.

In February 2020, Israeli doctor Vered Windman attended the ISPCAN event in Doha, Qatar.

In October 2026, Marc Owen Jones and Sohan Dsouza revealed an online Israeli operation in France designed to manipulate public opinion about Qatar, using multiple faked videos.

== Economic relations ==
Qatar established unofficial trade relations with Israel in 1996, the second state bordering the Persian Gulf to do so after Oman. In 2000, Israel's trade office in Qatar was closed down by authorities.

Qatar severed trade relations with Israel in 2009 following the Gaza War. In 2010, Qatar twice offered to restore trade relations with Israel and allow the reinstatement of the Israeli mission in Doha, on the condition that Israel allow Qatar to send building materials and money to Gaza to help rehabilitate infrastructure, and that Israel make a public statement expressing appreciation for Qatar's role and acknowledging its standing in the Middle East. Israel refused on the grounds that Qatari supplies could be used by Hamas to build bunkers and reinforced positions from which to fire rockets at Israeli cities and towns, and that Israel did not want to get involved in the competition between Qatar and Egypt over the Middle East mediation. However, Qatar did mediation talks with Hamas and Israeli officials.

According to the Israeli Central Bureau of Statistics, Israeli exports to Qatar amounted to $509,000 in 2012, mainly machinery, computer equipment and medical instruments. Imports from Qatar amounted to $353,000 in 2013, mainly plastics.

In December 2018, Israel permitted a €13 million payment from Qatar to Gazan workers as part of a six monthly payment to help with humanitarian crisis in the Gaza region. There have been frequent talks between Israel and Qatar on matters relating to Gaza since 2014 via Qatar's envoy to Gaza Mohammed al-Emadi who has been in regular contact with Israel.

In November 2021 Israel and Qatar signed an agreement allowing Qatar to trade in diamonds and Israeli merchants to enter Qatar and open offices.

In August 2026, Israel halted all weapons exports to Qatar and all maintenance and baking efforts connected to prior sales, calling it "an evil state" which works against the country and citing its hosting of Hamas leaders for years, as well as alleged attempts to influence Israeli public opinion, including paying Prime Minister Netanyahu's aides. (Note: Israel has no diplomatic relations with Qatar and has not sold any systems to it directly. However, Israel has supplied Qatar hundreds of millions of dollars' worth of technology which was part of bigger American-delivered systems, including air defense, night vision, and advanced avionics.)

== Sporting events ==
In February 2008, tennis player Shahar Pe'er became the first Israeli to compete in a WTA Tour event in the Arabian Peninsula when she reached the third round of the Qatar Total Open in Doha. Later on, she competed again in Qatar in 2012.

In 2009, Qatar said that it would welcome Israel footballers if it were to win the bid for the 2022 FIFA World Cup.

In 2014, Israeli swimmers took part in the 2014 FINA World Swimming Championships (25 m) in Doha. In 2016, Israeli beach volleyball duo, Sean Faiga and Ariel Hilman, participated in the FIVB Qatar Open in Doha.

In January 2018, Israeli tennis player Dudi Sela competed at the 2018 Qatar ExxonMobil Open. In February, Israeli youth handball team played at the 2018 Handball World School Championship in Qatar. In October, Israeli gymnasts competed in the 2018 World Artistic Gymnastics Championships, which was held for the first time in Doha, Qatar and the Middle East. In November, Israeli equestrian Danielle Goldstein participated in the 2018 Global Champions Tour in Doha, Qatar.

In March 2019, the Israeli national anthem was played in Qatar after Israeli gymnast Alexander Shatilov won the gold medal for the floor exercise during the 2019 FIG Artistic Gymnastics World Cup series. In Autumn 2019, Israeli athletes contended at the 2019 World Athletics Championships in Doha, Qatar.

In January 2021, Israelis competed at the 2021 Judo World Masters in Doha. In June 2021, Israeli Artem Dolgopyat won a gold medal at the 2021 FIG Artistic Gymnastics World Cup series, hosted in Doha.

When Qatar was awarded the right to host the 2022 FIFA World Cup, they stated that Israel would be allowed to compete in the tournament should they qualify. In 2022, Israel and Qatar announced they would be starting direct flights between Tel Aviv and Doha for the FIFA World Cup.

In September 2025, following the 2025 Israeli strike on Doha, Israeli media reported that Qatar lobbied UEFA to expel Israel from the confederation. Doha News, in an interview with an unnamed authority in European football, reported that the official refuted the claim that the proposal was advanced by Qatar.

== See also ==
- History of the Jews in Qatar
