= Nonoo =

Nonoo is a surname. Notable people with the surname include:

- Ebrahim Daoud Nonoo (born 1960), Bahraini businessman and politician
- Houda Nonoo (born 1964), Bahraini diplomat
- Misha Nonoo (born 1987), US-based British-Bahraini fashion designer
