= History of the Jews in the Arabian Peninsula =

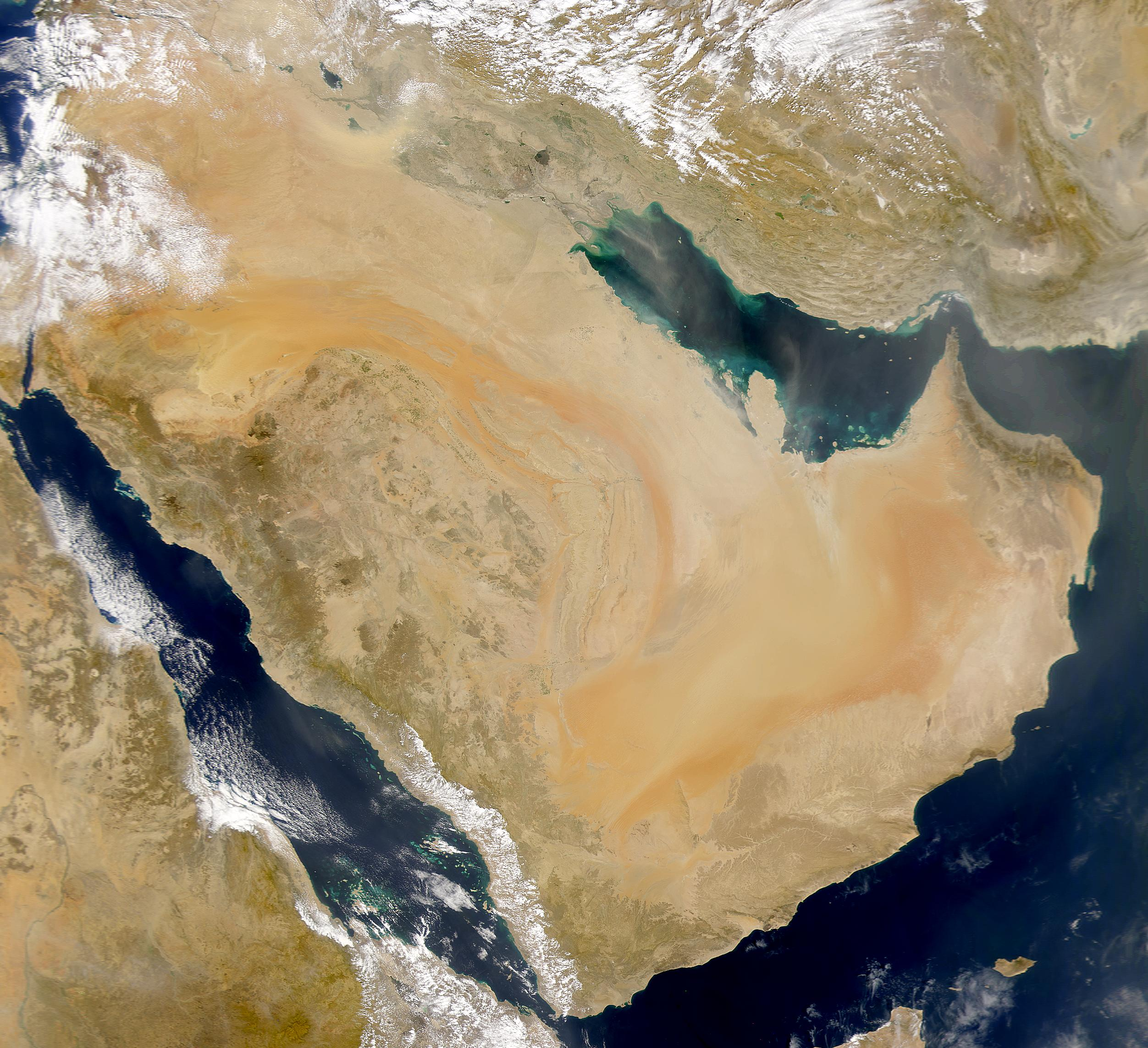
The Arabian Peninsula.

The history of Jews in the Arabian Peninsula dates back to Classical and Biblical times. The Arabian Peninsula is defined as including the present-day countries of Bahrain, Kuwait, Oman, Qatar, Saudi Arabia, United Arab Emirates (a federation of seven Sheikhdoms: Abu Dhabi, Ajman, Dubai, Fujairah, Ras al-Khaimah, Sharjah, and Umm al-Quwain) and Yemen politically and parts of Iraq and Jordan geographically.

Jewish communities were historically concentrated in the regions of present-day Iraq and Yemen, though most have since migrated to or fled to Israel as a result of the Arab–Israeli conflict. Currently, some Jewish communities exist in Arabia as a result of expanding business and commerce as well as increased tolerance to Jews, such as in Bahrain and the United Arab Emirates.

== History of the Jews in Iraq ==
The history of the Jews in Iraq is documented over twenty-six centuries, from the time of the Babylonian captivity c. 600 BCE, as noted in the Hebrew Bible and other historical evidence from the period, to modern Iraq. Iraqi Jews constitute one of the world's oldest and most historically significant Jewish communities.

In the 1930s, the situation of the Jews in Iraq deteriorated. Previously, the growing Iraqi Arab nationalist sentiment included Iraqi Jews as fellow Arabs, but these views changed with ongoing conflict in the Palestinian Mandate. Despite protestations of their loyalty to Iraq, Iraqi Jews were increasingly subject to discrimination and harsh laws. On August 27, 1934 many Jews were dismissed from public service, and quotas were set up in colleges and universities. Zionist activities were banned, as was the teaching of Jewish history and Hebrew in Jewish schools. Following Rashid Ali's pro-Axis coup, the Farhud ("violent dispossession") pogrom of June 1 and 2, 1941, broke out in Baghdad in which approximately 200 Jews were murdered (some sources put the number higher), and up to 2,000 injured—damages to property were estimated at $3 million. There was also looting in many other cities at around the same time. Afterwards, Zionist emissaries from Palestine were sent to teach Iraqi Jews self-defense, which they were eager to learn."

From 1950 to 1952, Operation Ezra and Nehemiah airlifted 120,000 Iraqi Jews to Israel via Iran and Cyprus. By 1968 only 2,000 Jews remained in Iraq.Immediately prior to the Gulf War, the U.S. State Department noted that there was no recent evidence of overt persecution of Jews, but travel, particularly to Israel, was restricted, as was contact with Jewish groups abroad. In 1997, the Jerusalem Post reported that in the previous five years, some 75 Jews had fled Iraq, of whom about 20 moved to Israel and the rest mostly went to the United Kingdom and Netherlands. In the aftermath of the 2003 invasion of Iraq, the Jewish Agency launched an effort to track down all of the remaining Iraqi Jews to present them with an opportunity to emigrate to Israel, and found a total of 34 Jews. Six chose to emigrate, among them Ezra Levy, the father of Emad Levy, Baghdad's last rabbi.

After the defeat of the Ba'ath regime, the process of establishing a new democratic government began. Among the subjects for debate over the Iraqi constitution was whether Jews should be considered a minority group, or left out of the constitution altogether.

In October 2006, Rabbi Emad Levy announced that he was leaving for Israel and compared his life to "living in a prison". He reported that most Iraqi Jews stay in their homes "out of fear of kidnapping or execution" due to sectarian violence.

Current estimates of the Jewish population in Baghdad are eight (2007), seven (2008) five (2013). or ten (2018). In 2020 the Jewish Population of Iraq is four. In March 2021 one Jew died leaving only four alive.

== History of the Jews in Jordan ==
In Biblical times, much of the territory of present-day Jordan was part of the Land of Israel or Palestine (region). According to the Hebrew Bible, three Israelite tribes lived on this territory: the Tribe of Reuben, the Tribe of Gad and the Tribe of Manasseh.

Since its 1516 incorporation in the Ottoman Empire, this territory was part of the vilayet (province) of Damascus-Syria until 1660, then part of the vilayet of Saida (Sidon), briefly interrupted by the 7 March – July 1799 French occupation of Jaffa, Haifa, and Caesarea.

During the siege of Acre in 1799, Napoleon issued a proclamation to the Jews of Asia and Africa to help him conquer Jerusalem. On 10 May 1832 it was one of the Turkish provinces annexed by Md. Ali's shortly imperialistic Egypt (nominally still Ottoman), but in November 1840 direct Ottoman rule was restored.

The British Balfour Declaration promised both sides of the Jordan River to the Jewish people, but that was changed by the Churchill White Paper which split off Transjordan from the British Mandate of Palestine. Following the United Nations Partition Plan for Palestine of 1947, Jordan was one of the Arab countries that attacked the new Jewish state of Israel. It gained some victories but it was eventually defeated during the Six-Day War when it attacked Israel again. Jordan eventually signed the Israel–Jordan Treaty of Peace. Currently, there are no legal restrictions on Jews in Jordan, and they are permitted to own property and conduct business in the country, but in 2006 there were reported to be no Jewish citizens of Jordan, nor any synagogues or other Jewish institutions.

== History of the Jews in Bahrain ==
The Arab states of the Persian Gulf

Bahrain's Jewish community is tiny; however, the history of the Jews in Bahrain goes back many centuries. Relations between Bahraini Jews and Bahraini Muslims are highly respectful, with Bahrain being the only state on the Arabian peninsula where there is a specific Jewish community. Bahrain is the only Gulf state with two synagogues and two cemeteries next to each other. One member of the community, Rouben Rouben, who sells TV sets, DVD players, copiers, fax machines and kitchen appliances from his downtown showroom, said "95 percent of my customers are Bahrainis, and the government is our No. 1 corporate customer. I've never felt any kind of discrimination."

Members play a prominent role in civil society: Ebrahim Nono was appointed in 2002 a member of Bahrain's upper house of parliament, the Consultative Council, while a Jewish woman heads a human rights group, the Bahrain Human Rights Watch Society. According to the JTA news agency, the active Jewish community is "a source of pride for Bahraini officials". Bahraini Jews constitute one of the world's smallest Jewish communities. There was a Jewish presence in Bahrain for many centuries, now mostly the descendants of immigrants who entered the country in the early 1900s from Iraq, Iran and India, numbered 600 families in 1948. Over the next few decades, most left for other countries, especially England, some 36 families remain as of 2006 with the total of over then 100 members. Today the community has a synagogue, which though disused is the only one in an Arab Persian Gulf state, and a small Jewish cemetery. Various sources number Bahrain's Jewish community as being from 36 to 50 people. Nancy Khedouri stated that there were 36 Jews in Bahrain. Larry Luxner states that in 2006 there were 36 Jews in Bahrain. As of 2008, 37 Jews were believed to be in the country. According to a 2017 article on Bahrain the number of Jews in Bahrain is about 30. Prior to the Abraham Accords, Bahraini Jews were not allowed to visit Israel. Bahrain officially agreed to cease adherence to the economic boycott of Israel in exchange for a free-trade agreement with the United States in 2004. At present, there have been no acts of physical violence or harassment of Jews or vandalism of Jewish community institutions, such as schools, cemeteries, or the synagogue. Although the Government has not enacted any laws protecting the right of Jews to religious freedom, Jews practice their faith privately without governmental interference. Nevertheless, the Government has made no specific effort to promote antibias and tolerance education. Some anti-Semitic political commentary and editorial cartoons continue to appear, usually linked to the Israeli-Palestinian conflict.

== History of the Jews in Kuwait ==
The history of the Jews in Kuwait is connected to the history of the Jews in Iraq. In 1776 Sadeq Khan captured Basra, many of the inhabitants left the country and among them were Jews who went to Kuwait. With the Jews' efforts, the country flourished with its buildings and trades. Around 1860, their number increased and their trade flourished. They were mostly wholesalers and worked with India—Baghdad and Aleppo. They even exported to Europe and China. There were about 80 Jewish families in Kuwait living in one district where the Bank of Trade. They had their own synagogue with their Sefer Torah. In the synagogue, they had separate place for the women. Saturday is a sacred day. Jews didn't work that day. They also had their own cemetery which shows that they lived there for a long time. Kuwait's population is now thirty five thousand and most of them are Arabs. Before 1914 there were about 200 Jews. Most of them went back to Baghdad and few went to India. There were two wealthy Jews in Kuwait but the rest were middle class, being Jewellers or material traders. The government of Kuwait had approved on building a new city called Madinat al-Hareer. A super mega-project that will host 1001 m high skyscraper. The tower will include a mosque, a synagogue and a church under a single roof. There are no Jewish citizens in Kuwait, though there are a dozen foreign Jews.

== History of the Jews in Oman ==
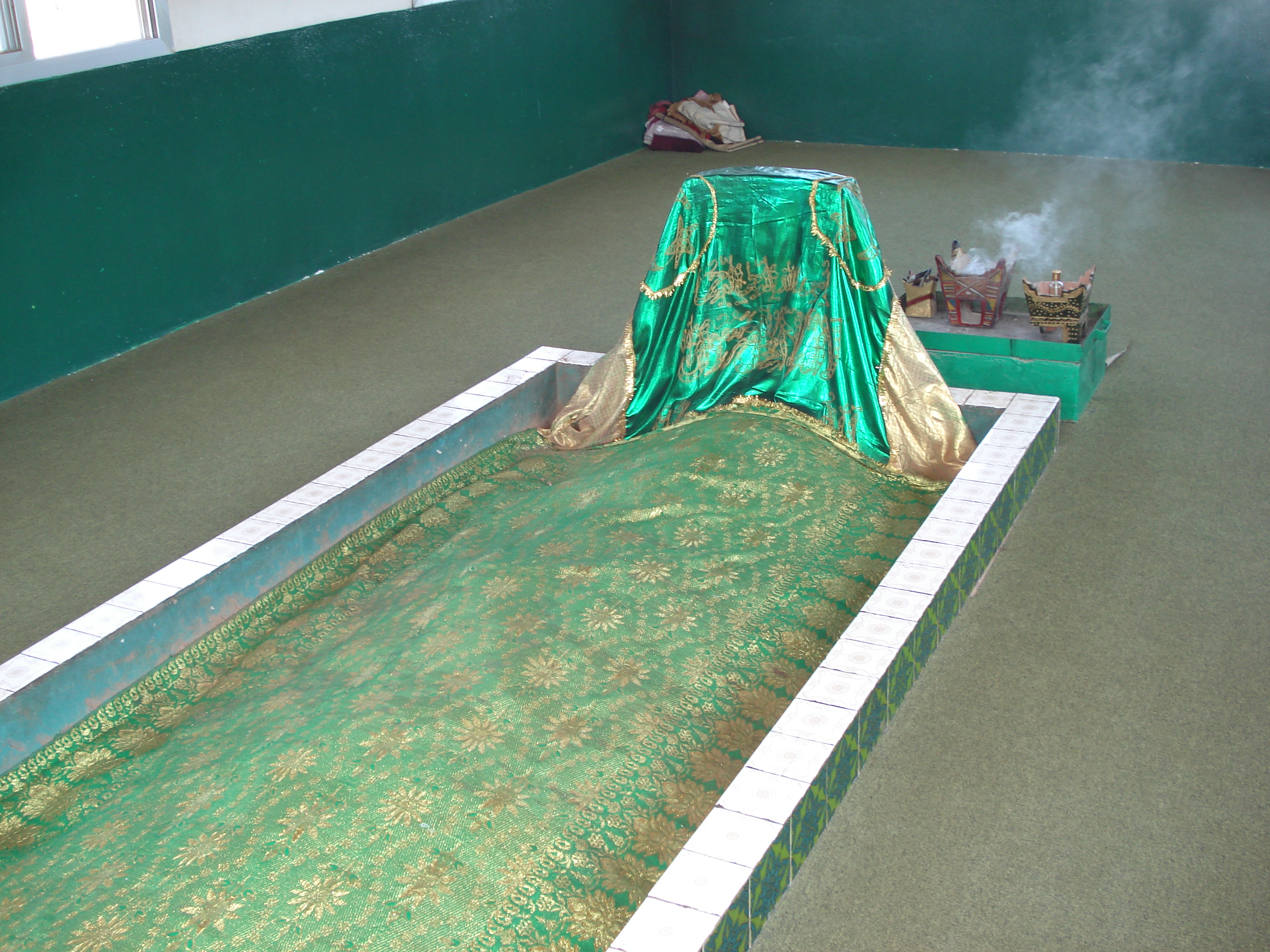
The Tomb of Job.

The history of the Jews in Oman goes back many centuries; however, the Jewish community in Oman is no longer extant. The Tomb of Job is located 45 miles from the port city of Salalah. The documented Omani Jewish community was made famous by Ishaq bin Yahuda, a merchant who lived in the 9th century. Bin Yahuda lived in Sohar, and sailed for China between the years of 882 and 912 after an argument with a Jewish colleague, where he made a great fortune. He returned to Shoar and sailed for China again, but his ship was seized and bin Yahuda was murdered at the port of Sumatra.

In the mid 19th century, the British Lieutenant James Raymond Wellsted documented the Jews of Muscat in his memoirs Travels in Arabia, vol. 1. He mentions that there are "a few Jews in Muskat (sic), who mostly arrived there in 1828, being driven from Baghdad . . .by the cruelties and extortions of the Pacha Daud." He also notes that Jews were not discriminated against at all in Oman, which was not the case in other Arab countries. Despite the lack of persecution in Oman, the community is believed to have disappeared before 1900.

During World War II, a Jewish American Army enlisted man, Emanuel Glick, encountered a small community of Omani Jews in Muscat, but this community consisted mostly of recent migrants from Yemen. Today the community no longer exists.

== History of the Jews in Qatar ==
There are few Jews in Qatar. However, the Anti-Defamation League has protested the existence of anti-judaic stereotypes in Qatar's newspapers.

As an indication of the opening up of Qatari society to Western influence, the Jewish Telegraphic Agency reported that a forum on U.S.-Islamic relations in Qatar will feature Israeli and U.S. Jewish participants. Former President Clinton and Sheikh Hamad Bin Khalifa Al-Thani, the emir of Qatar, are the scheduled keynote speakers at the Jan.10–12 U.S.-Islamic Forum in Doha. The forum is sponsored by the Project on U.S. Policy Towards the Islamic World, funded by the Saban center, which was founded by American-Israeli entertainment mogul Haim Saban.

A news report describes the preparations for US troops stationed in Qatar: "NEW YORK – The Jewish members of America's armed forces will again receive kosher K-rations this Pesach throughout the holiday, provided by the U.S. Defense Department...Each chaplain stationed in Iraq will hold two seders at base camps, with central seders taking place in Baghdad, Falluja and Tikrit. There will also be two seders at the army headquarters in Bahrain, and air force headquarters in Qatar. Jewish soldiers stationed in remote locations will be able to attend seders led by soldiers who received special training for that purpose."

== History of the Jews in Saudi Arabia ==
The first mention of Jews in the area of what is today Saudi Arabia dates back, by some accounts, to the time of the First Temple. By the 6th and 7th centuries there was a considerable Jewish population in Hejaz, mostly in and around Medina (or Yathrib as it called by the time), Khaybar, and Tayma.

There were three main Jewish tribes in Medina, forming the most important Hejazi community before the rise of Islam in Arabia. These were the Banu Nadir, the Banu Qainuqa and the Banu Qurayza. Banu Nadir, the Banu Qainuqa, and the Banu Qurayza lived in northern Arabia, at the oasis of Yathribu until the 7th century, when the men were sentenced to death and women and children enslaved after betraying the pact made with the Muslims following the Invasion of Banu Qurayza by Muslim forces under Muhammad.

There was a small Jewish community, mostly members of Bnei Chorath, lived in one border city from 1934 until 1950. The Yemeni city of Najran was conquered by Saudi forces in 1934, absorbing its Jewish community, which dates to pre-Islamic times. With increased persecution, the Jews of Najran made plans to evacuate. The local governor at the time, Amir Turki ben Mahdi, allowed the 600 Najrani Jews a single day on which to either evacuate or never leave again. Saudi soldiers accompanied them to the Yemeni border. These Jews arrived in Saada, and some 200 continued south to Aden between September and October 1949. The Saudi King Abdulaziz demanded their return, but the Yemeni king, Ahmad bin Yahya refused, because these refugees were Yemenite Jews. After settling in the Hashid Camp (also called Mahane Geula) they were airlifted to Israel as part of the larger Operation Magic Carpet.

There is limited Jewish activity in Saudi Arabia today. Jews and all other non-Muslims are not permitted to visit or live in Mecca or Madinah. Public worship of all religions but Islam is strictly forbidden.

However, US Secretary of State Henry Kissinger, the first Jew to hold that position, came to Saudi Arabia on ten official trips on diplomatic missions on behalf of the United States.

During the Gulf War (1990–1991), when approximately a half million US military personnel assembled in Saudi Arabia, and many were then stationed there, there were many Jewish US service personnel in Saudi Arabia. It is reported that the Saudi government insisted that Jewish religious services not be held on their soil but that Jewish soldiers be flown to nearby US warships.

There has been virtually no Jewish activity in Saudi Arabia since the beginning of the 21st century. Census data does not identify any Jews as residing within Saudi Arabian territory.

== History of the Jews in the United Arab Emirates ==
A historical journey to visit far-flung Jewish communities was undertaken by Rabbi Benjamin of Tudela from 1165 to 1173 that crossed and tracked some of the areas that are today in the United Arab Emirates, which had also been under the control of the Persians. His trek began as a pilgrimage to the Holy Land. He may have hoped to settle there, but there is controversy about the reasons for his travels. It has been suggested he may have had a commercial motive as well as a religious one. On the other hand, he may have intended to catalogue the Jewish communities on the route to the Holy Land so as to provide a guide to where hospitality may have been found for Jews travelling to the Holy Land. He took the "long road" stopping frequently, meeting people, visiting places, describing occupations and giving a demographic count of Jews in every town and country. One of the known towns that Benjamin of Tudela reported as having a Jewish community was in a place called "Kis", located in Ras al-Khaimah, one of the seven emirates of the United Arab Emrirates. Modern Ras Al Khaimah covers an area of 656 square miles (1700 km^{2}) in the northern part of the Arabian Peninsula.

Since the formation of the United Arab Emirates in 1971, a small Jewish community has grown there. The community worshipped freely in a dedicated villa in Dubai and has done so since 2008. Its existence is supported by the Emirate's policy of tolerance, with the appointment of a Minister for Tolerance in 2016 leading to the creation of the National Tolerance Programme. The community includes Jews who call the United Arab Emirates home, as well as Jews who moved there because they are involved in business and commerce in the emirates, particularly Abu Dhabi and Dubai. In 2019, the United Arab Emirates government announced the year of tolerance, officially recognizing the existence of Jews in the nation and documenting them as part of the various religion minorities. According to Rabbi Marc Schneier, an estimate of about 150 families to 3,000 Jews live in the Emirates. The synagogue in Dubai is tailored to the local atmosphere with a Jewish benediction being recited during Shabbat to the president, Sheikh Khalifa bin Zayed al Nahyan as well as to the rest of the rulers of the Emirates.

As of June 2020, an offshoot community of the original 'villa community' was created as the Dubai Jewish Community, by the self-appointed president Solly Wolf, and Rabbi Levi Duchman. The JC community has Talmud Torah, kosher chicken shechita and a permanent villa located in Dubai.

== History of the Jews in Yemen ==
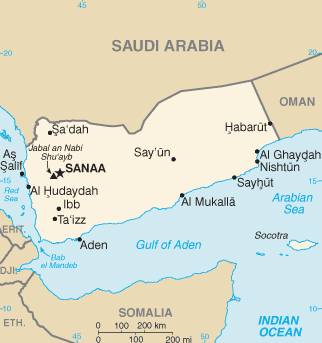
Map of the modern state of Yemen

Local Yemenite Jewish traditions have traced the earliest settlement of Jews in this region back to the time of King Solomon. One explanation is that King Solomon sent Jewish merchant marines to Yemen to prospect for gold and silver with which to adorn the Temple in Jerusalem. Another theory places Jewish craftsmen in the region as requested by Bilqis, the Queen of Saba (Sheba). The immigration of the majority of Jews into Yemen appears to have taken place about the beginning of the 2nd century CE, although the province is mentioned neither by Josephus nor by the main books of the Jewish oral law, the Mishnah and Talmud.

In 500 CE, at a time when the kingdom of Yemen extended into far into northern Arabia and included Mecca and Medina, the king Abu-Kariba Assad (of the Tobban tribe) converted to Judaism, as did several tribal leaders under him and probably a significant portion of the population. Pagans and Christians were not forced to convert, since Judaism teaches that there are righteous and godly people in all religions, who will be saved as such.

The kingdom had a tumultuous history. In 520, Abu-Kariba's son or relative Zoran Yusuf Dhu-Nuwas, took over the kingdom, and, in revenge it is said for the persecution of Jews in Byzantium, instituted taxes on the Christian population and especially harshly treated Byzantine merchants. This spurred Christians to appeal to the Byzantine Emperor to invade, but he referred the request onto the Christian Ethiopian king who obliged, crushing the Jewish kingdom and causing many Jews to flee northward into central Arabia and Medina. They added to the majority of Jews already in Medina.

The average Jewish population of Yemen for the first five centuries CE is said to have been about 3,000. The Jews were scattered throughout the country, but carried on an extensive commerce and thus succeeded in getting possession of many Jewish books. It seems that they were not deeply learned in Rabbinic traditions (although they were familiar with many midrashic interpretations of Torah passages), but they were certainly devout and observant Jews. Messianic hopes were strong and many messianic movements occurred down through the centuries. Maimonides, the great rabbi and thinker of the 12th century, leader of Egyptian Jewry, wrote his famous Letter to Yemen in response to desperate appeals from Jewish elders there about how to handle a madman who claimed to be the messiah and was wreaking serious harm on the community. Just within the nineteenth century there were three pseudo-messiahs: Shukr Kuhayl I (1861–2865), Shukr Kuhayl II (1868–2975), Joseph Abdallah (1888–1893).

Emigration from Yemen to Palestine – then ruled by the Ottoman Empire – began in 1881 and continued almost without interruption until 1914. It was during this time that about 10% of the Yemenite Jews left. Due to the changes in the Ottoman Empire citizens could move more freely and in 1869 travel was improved with the opening of the Suez Canal, which shorted the travel time from Yemen to the Holy Land. From 1881 to 1882 a few hundred Jews left Sanaa and several nearby settlements. This wave was followed by other Jews from central Yemen who continued to move into the Holy Land until 1914. The majority of these groups moved into Jerusalem and Jaffa. Before World War I there was another wave that began in 1906 and continued until 1914.

The State of Israel airlifted most of Yemen's Jews to Israel in Operation Magic Carpet in 1949 and 1950 shortly after the end of the Israeli 1948 Arab–Israeli War. In February 2009, ten Yemeni Jews immigrated to Israel, and in July 2009, three families, or 16 people in total, followed suit. On October 31, 2009, the Wall Street Journal reported that in June 2009, an estimated 350 Jews were left in Yemen, and by October 2009, 60 had emigrated to the United States, and 100 were considering following suit. The BBC estimated that the community numbered 370 and was dwindling. In 2010, it was reported that 200 Yemeni Jews would be allowed to immigrate to the United Kingdom.

In August 2012, Aharon Zindani, a Jewish community leader from Sana'a, was stabbed to death in a market in an anti-Semitic attack. Subsequently, his wife and five children emigrated to Israel, and took his body with them for burial in Israel, with assistance from the Jewish Agency and the Israeli Foreign Ministry.

In January 2013, it was reported that a group of 60 Yemenite Jews had immigrated to Israel in a secret operation, arriving in Israel via a flight from Qatar. This was reported to be part of a larger operation which was being carried out in order to bring the approximately 400 Jews left in Yemen to Israel in the coming months. In March 2015 it was reported that the Jewish population in Yemen numbered 90

On October 11, 2015, Likud MK Ayoob Kara stated that members of the Yemenite Jewish community had contacted him to say that the Houthi-led Yemen government had given them an ultimatum to convert or leave the country. A spokesman for the party of former President Ali Abdullah Saleh denied the reports as incorrect.

On March 21, 2016, a group of 19 Yemenite Jews were flown to Israel in a secret operation, leaving the population at about 50. In April 2017, it was reported that 40 of the last 50 Jews were in an enclave next to the American Embassy in Sana'a, and they were subject to threats of ethnic cleansing by the Houthis.

In May 2017 the Yemeni-based charity Mona Relief (Yemen Organization for Humanitarian Relief and Development) gave aid to 86 members of the Jewish community in Sana'a. In 2019, the Mona Relief website reported (February 25): "Mona Relief's team in the capital Sana'a delivered today monthly food aid packages to Jewish minority families in Yemen. Mona Relief has been delivering food aid baskets to Jewish community in the capital Sana'a since 2016. Our project today was funded by Mona Relief's online fundraising campaign in indiegog ..." Status of Jews in Yemen in 2020:On April 28, 2020 Yemenite Minister Moammer al-Iryani remarked the fate of the last 50 Jews in Yemen is unknown A 2020 World Population Review with a Census of Jewish population by country has no listing of any Jews in Yemen. On July 13, 2020 it is reported that the Houthi Militia is capturing the last Jews of Yemen On July 16, 2020 5 Jews were allowed to leave Yemen by the Houthi leaving 33 Jews in the Country In July 2020 the Mona Relief reported on their Website that as of July 19, 2020 of the Jewish Population in Yemen there were only a "handful" of Jews in Sana'a On August 8, 2020 a Jewish family from Yemen reunited in the United Arab Emirates with family members from London England after 15 years. In August/September 2020 the last 100 Jews in Yemen are in the process of immigrating from Yemen to the U.A.E. As of January 2021 31 Jews are left in Yemen; 49 have immigrated to the U.A.E. During the holiday of Passover On 28 March 2021, the Iranian-backed Houthi government deported all 13 remaining Jews in Yemen except for 4 elderly community members who were too old or infirm to be relocated(according to other reports the last Jews in Yemen number six persons: one woman and her brother; 3 others plus one man [Levi Salem Marhabi] jailed for helping smuggling a Torah scroll to Israel. It is also reported one Jewish woman was kidnapped and force married/converted to a muslim in 2006 was also left behind.) In March 2022 the United Nations reports there is just 1 Jew in Yemen (Levi Salem Marhabi). Four other Jewish communities were related to the Jews of Yemen:

- The Jews of Muscat, Oman were from Yemen; they lived in Oman during World War II and 1948 but do not live there anymore. [See above listing]
- The Jews of Aden suffered anti-Jewish riots in December 1947 in which 76-82 died and 76 wounded. Virtually the entire population emigrated from Aden between June 1947 and September 1967. In March 2020 it is reported that the Jewish Cemetery in Aden had been destroyed. Related to this community is that Addis Ababa Ethiopia at one point had a prominent Adenite community. Most of them left fairly quickly, with many making aliyah, however some stayed and established synagogues and Hebrew schools. By 1986, there were only six Adeni families left in the city, and almost all of their property was seized by the Mengistu regime.
- The Jews of Djibouti. The vast majority of the community made aliyah to Israel in 1949. After their departure most Jewish properties were settled by the local Issa people. A modest cemetery and the grand synagogue (which was renovated into office spaces in 2012, leaving only the original outside facade) are the only two Jewish structures still standing in the country. Nowadays, the Jews living in Djibouti are mostly French expatriates with Jewish origins and the native population of “just a few isolated, unaffiliated Jews.”
- The Jews of Eritrea. The community thrived for several decades before mass emigration began during the Eritrean War of Independence. Eritrea formally gained its independence in 1993. At the time, there were only a handful of Jews still left in the country. All but one have either died or emigrated. Today, there is only one last native Jew left in Eritrea, Sami Cohen, who runs an import-export business and attends to the Asmara synagogue. There are also a few non-native Jews residing in Asmara, some of them Israelis attached to the local Israeli Embassy.

== See also ==
- Abrahamic religion
- Arab Jews
- Arab states of the Persian Gulf
- Babylonian captivity
- History of the Jews under Muslim rule
- Islam and antisemitism
- Jewish exodus from Arab lands
- Jews outside Europe under Nazi occupation
- Judaism and Islam
- Judaism in pre-Islamic Arabia
- List of Jews from the Arab World
- Mizrahi Jews
- The ten families
