= History of the Jews in Bahrain =

Bahraini Jews
اليهود البحرينيون יהודים בחריינים

Total population
- 37

Regions with significant populations
- Manama, Capital Governorate

Languages
- Arabic, Hebrew

Religion
- Judaism

Related ethnic groups
- Jews (Arab Jews, Iraqi Jews, Yemenite Jews)

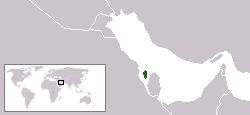
Geographic location of Bahrain

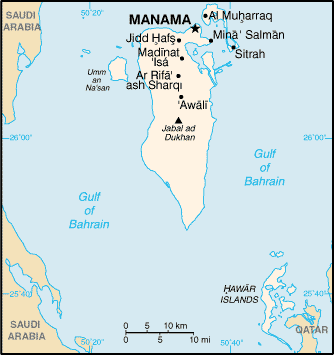
Bahrain

The history of the Jews in Bahrain goes back to ancient times. Bahraini Jews constitute one of the world's smallest Jewish communities, although its origins go back to late antiquity. Talmudic sources refer to ports and islands on the Persian Gulf, indicating that Jews may have already settled in this region. Arabic sources record Jews in the old capital of Bahrain, Hajar, at the time of the Islamic conquest in 630 C.E. In the 12th century, the Jewish traveler-adventurer Benjamin of Tudela mentions 500 Jews living in Qays, and 5,000 in Al-Qatîf, involved in pearl fishery. In the 19th century, there were Jewish merchants from Iraq, Persia, and India in Bahrain.

The Jewish community declined during the twentieth century. In 1968, only some 100 Jews remained in the new capital city of Manama. At the beginning of the twenty-first century, about 30 Jews remained in Bahrain. The community maintained ownership of a synagogue, but it was not in use and services were held in private homes on holidays. The Jewish community also maintained its cemetery.

From its independence in 1971, Bahrain had no official relations with Israel until the Oslo Agreements were signed between Israel and the Palestinians in 1993. Subsequently, semi-official relations, particularly commercial, were established. Bahraini Jews were not allowed to visit Israel, although, officially, Bahrain agreed to cease adherence to the economic boycott of Israel in exchange for a free-trade agreement with the United States in 2004.

In September 2020, Bahrain and Israel agreed to establish diplomatic relations. Travel links between the two countries were also established. As of 2022 the majority of Jews live in Umm al Hassam in Manama.

== Early history ==
There are Talmudic references made of a Jewish community dating back in the geographic areas of present-day Bahrain, as well as references in Arabic texts to a Jewish presence in Hajar (eastern coast of inland Arabia) during Mohammed's time. Jews are reported to have been living in what became the modern kingdom of Bahrain since the times of the Talmud. Arabic sources state that Jews lived in Hajar, the capital of Bahrain, in 630 CE and refused to convert to Islam when most of the population of the island did.

== Modern history ==
Modern Bahrain's Jewish community traces its origins to the migration of Iraqi traders from the Jewish Yadgar family in the 1880s.

After World War II, increasing anti-British sentiment spread throughout the Arab World and led to riots in Bahrain. The riots focused on the Jewish community. In 1948, there were 1,500 Jews living in Bahrain, while some sources give the Jewish population as 600 in 1948. On 5 December 1947, riots broke out against the Jewish community in Manama in the wake of ongoing violence in Palestine. A mob looted Jewish homes and shops, destroyed the city's synagogue, physically assaulted Jews, and murdered an elderly Jewish woman. Most members of Bahrain's Jewish community abandoned their properties and evacuated to Bombay, later settling in Israel, many of them in the town of Pardes Hanna-Karkur; others went to the United Kingdom. The 1950 census found 293 Jews in the country.

Houda Nonoo told The Independent newspaper: "I don't think it was Bahrainis who were responsible. It was people from abroad. Many Bahrainis looked after Jews in their houses." This view is supported by Charles Belgrave, formerly a political adviser to the government of Bahrain – which at the time was subject to treaty relations with Britain – who recalled in a memoir: "The leading Arabs were very shocked ... most of them, when possible, had given shelter and protection to their Jewish neighbours. ... [The riots] had one surprising effect; it put an end to any active aggression by the Bahrain Arabs against the Bahrain Jews." Following the riots, as well as the establishment of Israel and the 1948 Arab–Israeli War, many Bahraini Jews emigrated to Israel, the United States, or United Kingdom. Some 500–600 remained, but after riots broke out in the aftermath of the Six-Day War in 1967, Bahraini Jewry emigrated en masse.

== Twenty-first century ==
Jews are one of several communities that form the core of the liberal middle classes and several are even active in politics. A Jewish businessman, Ebrahim Daoud Nonoo, sat on the appointed upper house of the Bahraini Parliament's Shura Council. In 2005, he was replaced by his niece, Houda Ezra Nonoo. Since 2004, Ms. Nonoo also headed the Bahrain Human Rights Watch Society which has campaigned against the reintroduction of the death penalty in the tiny kingdom. Neither is considered a controversial figure, even among Salafi politicians.

As of 2007, the Jewish population of Bahrain numbered 36. At that time, the tolerance extended to the island's Jewish community is the result of the policy of its leader, King Hamad ibn Isa Al Khalifa. The island's boycott of Israeli products was in effect until 2004 when a free-trade agreement with the United States put an end to the official boycott.

Jewish Bahraini author Nancy Khedouri wrote From Our Beginning to Present Day about the Bahraini Jewish community:

... Bahraini Jews are well integrated into the life of the 700,000-person island kingdom, with Jewish government officials such as former Shura Council member Abraham David Nonoo and Khedouri's own family, Bahrain’s leading importer of tablecloths and linens.

Khedouri explained, "Most of the Jewish men were traders and the women worked as teachers, nurses, and from the very start developed strong bonds of friendship with the local citizens."

Ms. Khedouri was quoted by the Gulf News as saying that her book "shows how Bahrain has practiced religious tolerance all these years and how privileged everyone should feel to be living in this beautiful Kingdom, which has always offered and will continue to offer peace and security to all its citizens." In an earlier interview, with the Bahrain Tribune, Khedouri said, "The peaceful co-existence we have with the Bahrainis is proof of the religious tolerance advocated by His Majesty the King, Hamad bin Isa Al-Khalifa."

... Before the establishment of the State of Israel, nearly 600 Jews lived in Bahrain, but many fled in the wake of anti-Semitic rioting in 1947–48 and again in 1967. Currently, Bahraini Jews are not allowed to visit Israel, although, officially, Bahrain agreed to cease adherence to the economic boycott of Israel in exchange for a free-trade agreement with the United States in 2004.

In 2006, the US State Department reported that, there have been no acts of physical violence or harassment of Jews or vandalism of Jewish community institutions, such as schools, cemeteries, or the synagogue. Although the Government has not enacted any laws protecting the right of Jews to religious freedom, Jews practice their faith privately without governmental interference. Nevertheless, the Government has made no specific effort to promote antibias and tolerance education. Some antisemitic political commentary and editorial cartoons continue to appear, usually linked to the Israeli–Palestinian conflict.

In 2008, Bahrain's king nominated Houda Nonoo, a Jewish woman who served in the nation's 40-member upper house of Parliament, as its ambassador to the United States.

In November, 2010, Bahraini Jewish author Nancy Khedouri was appointed to replace Nonoo in Parliament.

Beginning in 2015, King al-Khalifa officially marked the celebration of Hanukkah, with Jewish and Muslim Bahrainis celebrating together.

On 11 September 2020, Israel and Bahrain agreed to "normalize relations."

== Abraham Accords ==
The agreement was announced by President Donald Trump on September 11, 2020, and followed on from a joint statement, officially referred to as the Abraham Accords, by the United States, Israel and the United Arab Emirates (UAE) on August 13, 2020. It was formally signed on September 15, 2020, at the White House in Washington, D.C., and made Bahrain the fourth Arab state to recognize Israel and the second within a month. The Bahrain's synagogue in Manama was renovated after normalization, and public Shabbat prayers resumed in 2021 for the first time since 1947. (Note: There is a separate short undated statement headed "The Abraham Accords Declaration:" signed by four parties including Bahrain while a contemporaneous agreement between the UAE and Israel contains the following statement " "Reaffirming the joint statement of the United States, the State of Israel and the United Arab Emirates" (the "Abraham Accords") dated 13 August 2020;") The agreements were named "Abraham Accords" to highlight the common belief of Judaism and Islam in the prophet Abraham.

== See also ==
- Bahrain–Israel relations
- List of Jews from Bahrain
- Arab Jews
- Arab states of the Persian Gulf
- History of the Jews in the Arabian Peninsula
- History of the Jews under Muslim rule
- Islam and antisemitism
- Jewish exodus from the Muslim world
- Jews outside Europe under Axis occupation
- Judaism and Islam
- List of Jews from the Arab World
- Mizrahi Jews
