= Eliyahu Basrawi =

Iraqi-British dental surgeon (born 1960)

Eliyahu

Medical and Front line Officer
- In office 1990–1991

Senior House Officer
- In office 1980–1988

Registrar at Basra General Hospital

Personal details
- Born: c.1960 Basra, Iraqi Republic
- Education: Al-Rashid Military Hospital

Eliyahu Basrawi (born 1960) is an Iraqi–British dental surgeon and a former army officer. He served in the Iraqi Armed Forces as a military doctor, during the Iran–Iraq War and the Gulf War, despite being one of the few remaining Jews in the country at the time.

During the Iran–Iraq War (1980–1988), Eliyahu worked at Basra General Hospital as a senior house officer and registrar, personally caring for soldiers with severe facial injuries. In the Gulf War (1990–1991), he was stationed near the front lines. Eliyahu survived bombings, severe shortages, and even a near-fatal misidentification as a corpse, earning admiration from colleagues for his resourcefulness and determination. His story of near to death experience was widely documented in the Jewish world, gaining global attention.

In 1991, following Iraq's defeat in the Gulf War and amid civil unrest in the 1991 uprising in Iraq, Eliyahu escaped to Baghdad before ultimately fleeing to the United Kingdom with the help of a Palestinian and a Shi'ite Muslim. Today he lives there and gave interviews to many Jewish newspapers.

== Early life ==
Eliyahu was born into the small and dwindling Jewish community in Iraq in Basra, which numbered approximately 150 by the end of the 20th century. He pursued a career in dentistry, becoming a dental surgeon from the University of Basrah. He was trained as Al-Rashid Military Hospital in Baghdad in 1985 by Dr Sa'ad Fadhil.

== Career ==
Eliyahu served as a senior house officer and registrar at Basra General Hospital during the Iran–Iraq War (1980–1988). Amidst primitive medical conditions and a severe lack of resources, he played a vital role in treating soldiers with severe facial and jaw injuries. At one point, he personally took on nursing duties for his patients, feeding them with liquids through a repaired liquidizer after it was deliberately sabotaged by a matron. With infections rampant and medical care standards abysmal, he often personally fed and nursed his patients.

In one notable instance, he repaired a broken liquidizer used to feed injured soldiers after a matron deliberately sabotaged it during a dispute. Her apology years later highlighted the respect he eventually earned for his perseverance and dedication.

=== Gulf War ===
In 1990, as Eliyahu prepared to leave Iraq for England to pursue further education on a scholarship, the Gulf War erupted. He returned to Basra Hospital and was later conscripted into the Iraqi Army, serving near the front lines just 50 kilometers from active combat. Upon his arrival, Eliyahu introduced himself as a Jew to his commanding officer, who was stunned, remarking, “We are fighting Israel, and they send me a Jew?” With no electricity, he created light by recycling candles, a skill inspired by observing his grandmother's Sabbath traditions. His ingenuity earned him admiration, including from a Shi’ite officer who, after seeing Eliyahu repair a shattered porcelain cup, remarked, “Now I know why you are called the chosen people.”

Eliyahu narrowly escaped death when the ambulance he was in was bombed during an allied air raid. He was rendered unconscious and presumed dead, only to be discovered alive by soldiers who noticed his toes twitching as they prepared to bury him. Declaring it a "message from heaven," they rushed him to intensive care, where he miraculously recovered without fractures despite severe concussion.

=== Escape ===
After surviving in Basra's military hospital on intravenous fluids and oranges brought by a grateful patient, he escaped to Baghdad with the help of a Shi’ite doctor and a group of Palestinians, who had been captured by the US Army in Kuwait. The journey, which should have taken seven hours, spanned two days due to bombed bridges and ongoing conflict. Starving and dehydrated, Eliyahu shared scant resources with fellow travelers.

== Later life ==
In September 1991, emaciated but alive, Eliyahu left Iraq and sought refuge in the United Kingdom, where he rebuilt his life.

== See also ==
- Iran–Iraq War
- Gulf War
- Iraqi Jews
