= Raphael Berdugo =

Moroccan rabbi and scholar (1747–1821)

Raphael Berdugo (Hebrew: רפאל בירדוגו; 1747 in Meknes – 1821), son of Rabbi Mordecai Berdugo, was a Dayan, a scholar, and an influential Moroccan rabbi.

Berdugo was respected by his contemporaries; his decisions continue to be a source of inspiration to Moroccan rabbis. His peers regarded him as an excellent speaker with natural authority and he did not shirk from conflict with the notables. He did not limit himself to his role as dayan but was also a community activist. Berdugo led the community leaders to abandon their old customs and follow those of the Jews of Castile. He also introduced reforms in the laws of inheritance—for example, the inheritance of a husband and children in case of the death of a wife.

Berdugo had several adversaries. One of them was Baruch Toledano. Their controversies were quite heated and have remained famous.

Berdugo is listed as a saint in Culte des Saints et Pélerinages Judéo-Musulmans au Maroc. He married a daughter of the Mashbir and had four sons.

== Publications ==
List of publications by Raphael Berdugo, some unpublished, and some published by Chalom Messas:

- Torot Emet - on the four sections of the Shulhan Aruch (Meknes 1939) - HebrewBooks.org
- Me Menuhot - homiletics on the Torah in two volumes (Jerusalem 1905) - HebrewBooks.org (I), HebrewBooks.org (II)
- Rav Peninim
- Messamehe Lev
- Mishpatim Yesharim - responsa, in two volumes (Kraków 1891) - HebrewBooks.org
- Sharvit HaZahav - hiddushim on various Talmudic tractates in two volumes (Jerusalem 1975) - HebrewBooks.org (II)

== See also ==
- Salomon Berdugo
