= History of the Jews in Djibouti =

The location of Djibouti in Africa

The Jews of Djibouti are classified as part of the wider Yemenite Jewish community similar to those in Eritrea and Aden. Originally settling in Obock, and finally Djibouti City, in the wake of the British succession of the Gulf of Tadjoura to the French in 1884. The vast majority of the community made aliyah to Israel in 1949.

== History ==
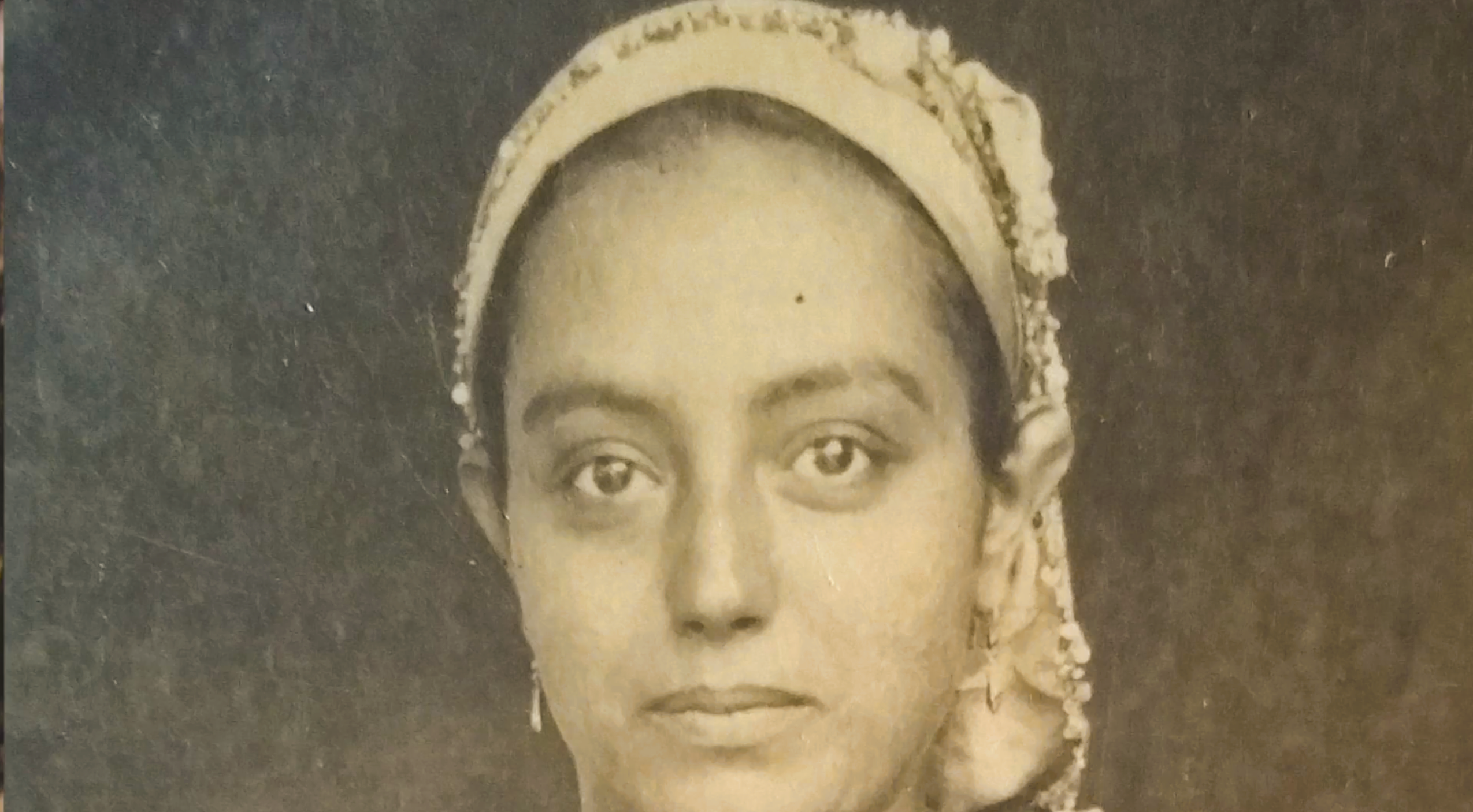
Traditional hair wrap Djibouti 1922.

Though situated between the historic homelands of the ancient communities of the Beta Israel and Yemenite Jewery and geographically serving as the main link between Arabia and the Horn of Africa there is no documented major presence of Jews in Djibouti until the 1800s. The history of the settlement of Jews in Djibouti begins primarily with the development of the port city of Djibouti at the end of the nineteenth century by the French, in the territory then called Côte Française des Somalis, which Jews would play a key role in helping to build.

The first documented Jews to permanently settle in Djibouti came from Aden, which had been a British colony since 1839. They were Jews from Yemen, a region where a large and diverse Jewish community existed at the time. It is unknown if the Djiboutian Jews are from the Adeni community or are Baladi from the north having just passed through Aden, as they have minhagim (customs) that reflect both. Their arrival is concomitant with the arrival of a large number of Yemeni Muslims.

There were fifty Jewish families in Djibouti in 1901 and 111 in 1921. With a slowing of migration between Yemen and Djibouti in the early 20th century much of the community consisted of native Djiboutians who converted and married into the established families. The French authorities counted eleven Jewish traders in 1902, and indicated that they mainly worked as jewelers and craftsmen. They had several synagogues, including the grand synagogue in the city center on Rue deRome. The Hahamim of Djibouti were sought for their halakhic expertise and skill throughout the region. One of the last Rabbi's of Djibouti, Haham Yoseph Moshe would travel to Jewish communities as far as Addis Ababa and Asmara who sought out his skills as a mohel.

The Jews were distinguished from their Muslim neighbours by their wearing of long sidelocks called payot and white fringed garments, similar to that of Yemenite Jews.

After Israel's independence in 1948, the state organized Operation Magic Carpet in 1949 which evacuated about 45,000 Yemenite Jews threatened by political unrest from Yemen to Israel. Two hundred Jews from Djibouti were included in the evacuation operation. Moshe Sion, a member of the Djibouti Jewish community recalls “a plane came from Aden and we all got on and flew to Israel.” Prior to moving to Israel, his father had served as a posek, hazzan, mohel and sofer of the Djibouti community.

After the mass aliyah of 1949, the community never recovered. Over the decades, the remaining families gradually left Djibouti in favor of Israel or France. Following their departure, most Jewish properties were settled by the local Issa people. A modest cemetery and the grand synagogue (which was renovated into office spaces in 2012, leaving only the original outside facade) are the only two Jewish structures still standing in the country.

Nowadays, the Jews that live in Djibouti are mostly French expatriates with Jewish origins and the native population of “just a few isolated, unaffiliated Jews.”

== See also ==
- History of the Jews in Africa

=== Regions: ===
- History of the Jews in Central Africa
- History of the Jews in East Africa
- History of the Jews in North Africa
- History of the Jews in Southern Africa
- History of the Jews in West Africa
