= Salomon Berdugo =

Moroccan rabbi and poet

- Born: 1854
- Died: 1906 (aged 51–52)
- Occupations: halakhic authority, poet and Rabbi
- Known for: Chief Rabbi in Meknes, Morocco
- Notable work: Die Hashev, Em le-Mesorot
- Spouse: Jimil Choen
- Children: 7

Salomon Berdugo (1854–1906) was a halakhic authority, poet and Chief Rabbi in Meknes, Morocco. He was the son of Rabbi Daniel Berdugo. In 1897 he was appointed rabbi of the community. He was the author of Die Hashev, Em le-Mesorot, responsa, a collection of laws and Torah novellae; appended are Musar Kaskel and Shirei Shelomo (1950) as well as many books of Jewish poetry and zmirot.

He married Jimil Choen. They had seven children.

== See also ==
- Raphael Berdugo
