= Israel–Oman relations =

Bilateral relations between Israel and Oman

- Israel: Oman

In line with the Arab League position in relation to Israel, Oman does not have fully normalized relations with Israel and took part in the boycott of Israel during much of the 20th century.

Oman established discreet relations with Israel in the 1970s and sought Israeli military assistance in fighting the Dhofar rebellion. In 1994, the countries established unofficial trade relations, which were discontinued in 2000. In 2018, Israeli Prime Minister Benjamin Netanyahu led a delegation to Oman and met with Sultan Qaboos and other senior Omani officials. In February 2019, Omani foreign minister Yusuf bin Alawi said that Oman would not normalize its relations with Israel until a sovereign Palestinian state has been established. Moreover, Oman has recently criminalized many specific ties with Israel.

In 2023, Oman announced it would allow Israeli aircraft to fly over its airspace, shortening flight times to Far East destinations, although Israel's flag carrier El Al stopped flights from flying over Omani airspace after the Gaza war.

== History ==
=== Background ===
Unlike most other nations in the region, Oman has not participated in any of the armed conflicts fought between Arab states and Israel.

=== Hidden relations ===
Oman established hidden relations with Israel in the 1970s. Oman established those ties in order to receive military assistance from Israel in fighting the Dhofar Marxist rebellion, in particular the Dhofar Liberation Front. Due to the sensitivity of such ties at the time, they were hidden from the United Kingdom.

Oman was one of two Arab nations (the other being Morocco) not to break off diplomatic relations with Egypt after the Camp David accords in 1979.

=== Establishment of relations (1994–2000) ===
In 1994, then-Prime Minister of Israel Yitzhak Rabin visited Oman, where he was greeted by Sultan of Oman Qaboos bin Said in Muscat. Among other things, the two sides discussed issues such as sharing water and how to improve water supplies. In 1995, a few days after Rabin was assassinated, then-acting prime minister Shimon Peres hosted Omani foreign minister Yusuf bin Alawi in Jerusalem.

In January 1996, Israel and Oman signed an agreement on the reciprocal opening of trade representative offices.

During the Madrid talks during the 1990s, Oman pushed for Arab-Israeli peace. Some diplomats and researchers have said that it is possible Oman was one of the first countries to push for such a peace.

Oman was interested at the time in agricultural assistance, with Israel assisting Omani agriculture and the combat of water inefficiency through the provision of Israeli drip irrigation technology. Oman had pushed at the time for a regional water project, specifically on desalination and was interested in Israeli technology.

=== Frozen relations (2000–2018) ===
Official relations were frozen with the outbreak of the Second Intifada in October 2000. Still, in 2008, Oman's Foreign Affairs Minister Yusuf bin Alawi bin Abdullah met with Israeli Foreign Minister Tzipi Livni during their visit to Qatar.

=== Visit by Israeli prime minister (2018) ===
In October 2018, Israeli prime minister Benjamin Netanyahu met Sultan Qaboos in Muscat; the visit was not disclosed until after Netanyahu returned to Israel. Right after the visit, Omani Foreign Minister Yusuf bin Alawi described Israel as an "accepted Middle East state." He said, "The world is also aware of this fact. Maybe it is time for Israel to be treated the same [as other states] and also bear the same obligations." In April 2019, Yusuf said that "Arabs must take initiatives to make Israel overcome 'fears for its future' in the region."

Netanyahu expressed condolences after the death of Qaboos in 2020.

=== Oman's position during the 2026 Iran war ===
In 2026, Sayyid Badr Al Busaidi, the Omani Foreign Minister, stated that Oman would not support the war between Israel and Iran and emphasized the need for diplomacy and de-escalation. Oman described the military escalation as destabilizing for the region and reiterated its longstanding policy of neutrality and mediation in Middle Eastern conflicts. The Omani government also indicated that it would not join a proposed regional "peace council" framework and would not normalize relations with Israel. At the same time, Oman participated as an observer in an early meeting of the initiative while maintaining its position that dialogue and diplomatic engagement should take precedence over military confrontation.
