= Bahrain Synagogue =

Synagogue in Manama, Bahrain

House of Ten Commandments
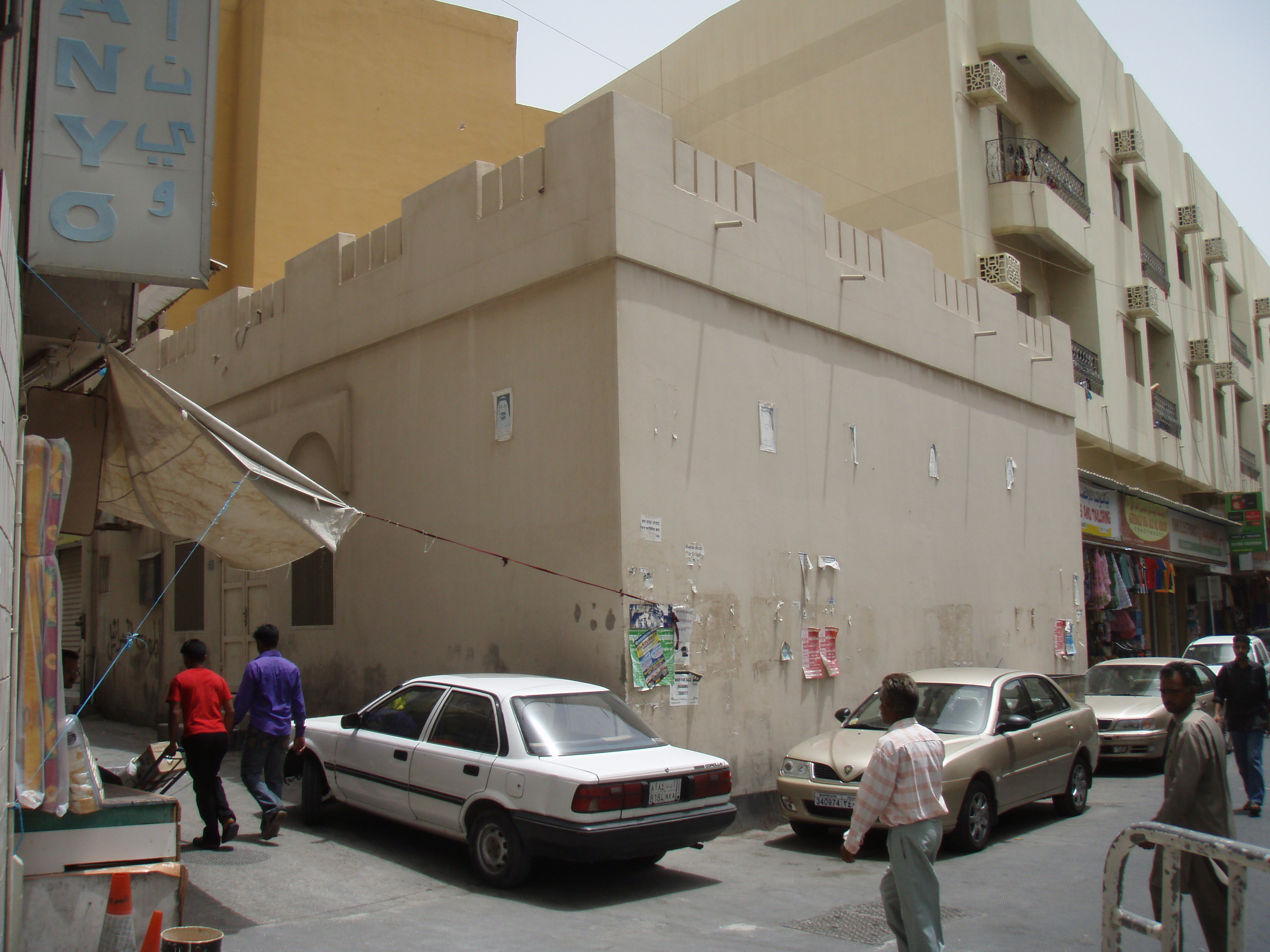
- House of Ten Commandments in 2009

Religion
- Affiliation: Judaism
- Rite: Sephardic
- Leadership: Ebrahim Daoud Nonoo

Location
- Location: Sasa'ah Avenue; Manama, Bahrain
- Interactive map of House of Ten Commandments
- Coordinates: 26.2305°N 50.574°E

House of Ten Commandments (Arabic: بيت الوصاية العشر, Hebrew: בית עשרת הדיברות), also called Bahrain Synagogue, is a synagogue located on Sasa'ah Avenue, in commercial district in Manama, Bahrain. House of the Ten Commandments is the oldest continuously operating synagogue in the Gulf Cooperation Council.

== History ==
The synagogue was built in the 1930s by Iranian Jewish merchant Shimon Cohen and financed by an American jeweller whose name is recorded only as Rosenthal and who came to Bahrain to buy pearls.

After the 1947 UN Partition Plan which envisaged partitioning Palestine, the synagogue was ransacked by foreign workers who worked in Bahrain. The riots caused many Bahraini Jews to emigrate. The synagogue was ransacked and burned and the country's Torah scroll was stolen. The Torah scroll was returned in damaged condition a number of years later.

The remaining Jewish community in Bahrain wanted to convert the building for another use or give it to charity, but the government of Bahrain insisted in remains as a synagogue. The government has also offered the Jewish community a piece of land to rebuild the synagogue. Ebrahim Daoud Nonoo, the Jewish community's unofficial leader and a member of Bahrain's National Assembly, undertook to renovate the synagogue.

The synagogue was renovated in 1997, 2006, and in 2021. In 2021, the synagogue was renovated at a cost of 60,000 Bahraini dinars ($159,000) and was opened to the public for the first time in 74 years since 1947.

== Overview ==
A sign outside the building reads "Bahrain Synagogue" in English, and "House of Ten Commandments" in Arabic and Hebrew. The synagogue has a wooden door and has arch-shaped wooden windows approximating the synagogue's design when it was built in the 1930s. The Ark cover is blue velvet and dedicated, in Hebrew, to the community’s deceased rabbi Shimon Cohen. The bima cover has a velvet cover dedicated in Hebrew to the normalization agreement between Bahrain and Israel, and the ark holds an Ashkenazi Torah, given to the King Hamad bin Isa Al Khalifa by Jared Kushner, that has the following inscription: "In honor of His Majesty King Hamad bin Isa Al Khalifa for his vision, courage and leadership in bringing peace, respect and religious tolerance to the Middle East. June 25, 2019, Jared Kushner."

There are services in the synagogue every Shabbat morning, though there is not always a minyan. It depends on who is visiting and whether there are tourists.

== See also ==
- Moses Ben Maimon Synagogue
- Umm Al Hassam
