= Ebrahim Daoud Nonoo =

Bahraini businessman

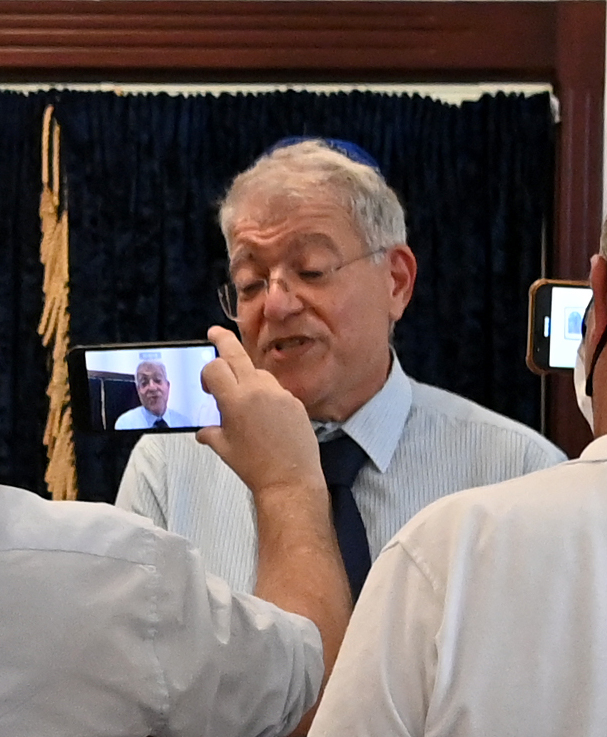

Shura Council
- In office 2000–2005
- Succeeded by: Houda Nonoo

Personal details
- Born: 1960 (age 65–66)

Ebrahim Daoud Nonoo (Arabic: إبراهيم داود نونو, born 1960) is a Bahraini businessman and politician. He was a member in the appointed upper house of the Bahraini Parliament's Shura Council between 2001 and 2006. He was the first Jewish member of the council. He is the current CEO of the Basma Company and president of the Association of Gulf Jewish Communities (AGJC)

He serves as the head of the House of the Ten Commandments Synagogue and as the head of the Jewish community of Bahrain.

The Nonoo family is originally from Basra, Iraq having moved to Bahrain over a century ago along with hundreds of Jews from Iraq who sought economic opportunities there, but continued to speak the Basrawi dialect. In 2006, Nonoo financed repairs to the country's only synagogue.

== See also ==
- Nancy Khedouri
- Houda Nonoo
