= Jews outside Europe under Axis occupation =

Treatment of Jews living outside Europe under Axis occupation in World War II

Jews outside Europe under Axis occupation suffered greatly during World War II. While there is academic consensus that the extermination of the non-European Jews was a long-term goal for the Nazi regime, it is less clear whether there were any imminent plans or policies to that end.

== In European North Africa ==
There were 400,000 Jews in France on the other side of the Mediterranean in North Africa (French Algeria, which was an integral part of metropolitan France, the French Protectorate in Morocco and the French protectorate of Tunisia). They were included in the number relevant to "the Final Solution to the Jewish Question in Europe" under: "France/unoccupied territory 700,000".

The Jews of the Axis occupied territories in North Africa were spared the mass deportations that occurred in most other areas that fell under Nazi occupation.

=== Jews of Italian Libya ===
Libya was under Italian rule. The Jews, who were British and Italian subjects, suffered from antisemitism and economic restrictions as a result of the strengthening of Italy's relationship with Germany. From 1942, laws of racial discrimination were activated in Libya. Men between the ages of 18 and 45 were recruited to forced labor, including at camps like Giado, and thousands died from hunger and epidemics. In February of that year, the Germans ordered the transfer of the Jews to concentration camps.

=== French North Africa ===
==== Jews of Vichy Algeria ====
Vichy France (that ruled in Algeria from 1940) cancelled the citizenship of the Jews and instituted the same restrictions that applied to the Jews in metropolitan France, meaning they were forbidden from working for the government, as bankers, teachers or enrolling as students. In addition, the number of Jews permitted to work in free professions was limited. In 1941, the property of the Jews was confiscated. However, Islamic religious leaders throughout Algiers delivered sermons warning Muslims against participation in schemes to strip Jews of their property. The suffering of the Jews of Algeria was worsened by their previous high position in society. In 1941, some Jews joined the anti-Nazi underground. Many Jews were caught and were sent to labor camps or were executed. The Judenräte required assistance in preparation of materiel. In November 1942 Algeria was liberated by Anglo-American forces. In 1943, the restraints on the Jews of Algeria were officially cancelled.

==== Jews of Vichy Tunisia ====
Tunisia was also ruled by pro-Nazi Vichy France, which extended its anti-Jewish measures to Morocco and Algeria. In November 1942 Nazi Germany occupied French Tunisia for six months, until May 1943. SS Oberstrumbannführer Walter Rauff, a brutal and notorious killer involved in the development of death gas vans and the Final Solution in Eastern Europe, was posted as commander of Tunis. From July 1942 until May 1943, he headed an Einsatzkommando to take care of the Jewish Question in Tunisia, and to continue to implement the Final Solution in Vichy Tunisia. Oswald Pohl, charged by Himmler to organize the camps in Eastern Europe, joined him. Despite constant attacks by the Allies, Rauff instigated drastic anti-Jewish policies.

The Nazis established a local Judenrat, took hostages, confiscated the property of the Jews (Aryanization) and imposed on the community heavy financial punishments. The community was required to provide the needs of the German army, and the synagogue become a German storeroom. The Jews were marked with the yellow badge, 5,000 Jews were sent to more than 30 slave labor camps in Tunisia and a few were sent to the extermination camps. Many Jews were murdered by means of being shot in their homes, death marches, hunger, disease and bombings.

==== Jews of Vichy Morocco ====
In 1940, the Nazi-controlled Vichy government issued antisemitic decrees excluding Jews from public functions and imposing the wear of the yellow Star of David. Sultan Mohamed V refused to apply these laws and, as sign of defiance, insisted on inviting all the rabbis of Morocco to the 1941 throne celebrations.

== In Asia ==
=== Jews of Iraq ===
While not under occupation by Nazi Germany, Iraq was, for a short term, under the Nazi-allied regime of Rashid Ali al-Gaylani. While the regime did not last long, the Farhud (a pogrom in which 180 Jews died) is considered among its results.

=== Jews in Japan and China ===
Prior to the war there was a small Jewish presence in Japan, particularly Kobe, which consisted of Jews originating predominantly from Russia, as well as those from the Middle East, Eastern Europe, and the United States. In Japanese-occupied China, there was a more significant Jewish population, including White Russian refugees and Baghdadi Jews. As Jewish persecution in Europe stepped up, an increasing number of refugees traveled to China by steamship or had transited through the Soviet Union and were hoping to move on to the United States. Most of these Jews were concentrated in the Shanghai International Settlement.

When Japan entered the war, many Jews were interned, including the Baghdadi Jews who were identified as British subjects. The Japanese implemented strict measures to control the activities of the Shanghai ghetto, which was restricted in 1943 to a one square mile city block shared with 100,000 Chinese. However, despite repeated requests from Nazi Germany to implement antisemitic policies, including exterminating the Jewish population in the Shanghai ghetto, the Jewish population was generally left alone (apart from wartime privations).

=== Jews in Vichy French Indochina ===
As late as 1939, the estimated combined population of the Jewish communities of Haiphong, Hanoi, Saigon and Tourane in French Indochina numbered approximately 1,000 individuals. There were also reportedly eighty Jews in Tonkin during the period of Vichy rule, of which forty-nine were in the military and twenty-seven were in the foreign legion.

In 1940 the antisemitic Vichy French Law on the status of Jews was implemented in French Indochina (Vietnam, Cambodia, Laos) by its Governor Jean Decoux. In November 1940, Jewish people were limited to certain professions, and in July 1941 Jewish children were not allowed to be more than 2% of public school students. By October 1942, fifteen government employees were dismissed from their positions for being Jewish (among the fifteen was Suzanne Karpelès, the director of the Buddhist Institutes in Phnom Penh and Vientiane), and Jews were "fired from a wide range of professions, from banking to the insurance, advertising, administration and business sectors." One such individual, Leo Lippmann, the former director of the Hanoi tram company, was dismissed from his position even after resigning from his post to assume a lesser position. However, since he had been categorized as a Jew because he had two Jewish grandparents and a Jewish wife, Lipmann divorced and no longer fell under the Jewish Statute. When it was deemed by state officials that the statute would have an adverse effect upon their racial Vichy motives for the region – such as the case of Georges Coedès, an employee at the government sponsored École française d'Extrême-Orient (French School of the Far East), who was deemed useful by the resident superior of Tonkin – an exemption to the discriminatory laws could be made. The anti-Jewish laws were repealed in January 1945.

=== Jews in Vichy French Syria and Lebanon ===
Although reports differ, there were roughly 30,000 Jews in Syria and 20,000 in Lebanon at the beginning of World War II. Following the Fall of France in June 1940 and the establishment of the Vichy Government, the situation for these Jews drastically deteriorated. The new anti-Jewish laws of Vichy were extended to the Mandate for Syria and the Lebanon. Henri Dentz, High Commissioner in Syria, intended to establish concentration camps, but the British and Free French forces took over the territory before he could. Nonetheless, a prison camp for European Jews under the mandate was established in the mountains, although it was later shut down by the Allies. Around 1,350 Syrian Jews escaped to Palestine in a complicated operation as part of the Aliyah effort. In 1941, Charles de Gaulle officially annulled the anti-Jewish legislation in Syria and Lebanon.
