= Derrick Simmons =

Derrick Simmons may refer to:

- Derrick Simmons (politician)
- Derrick Simmons (director)
