= Eastern Consolidated =

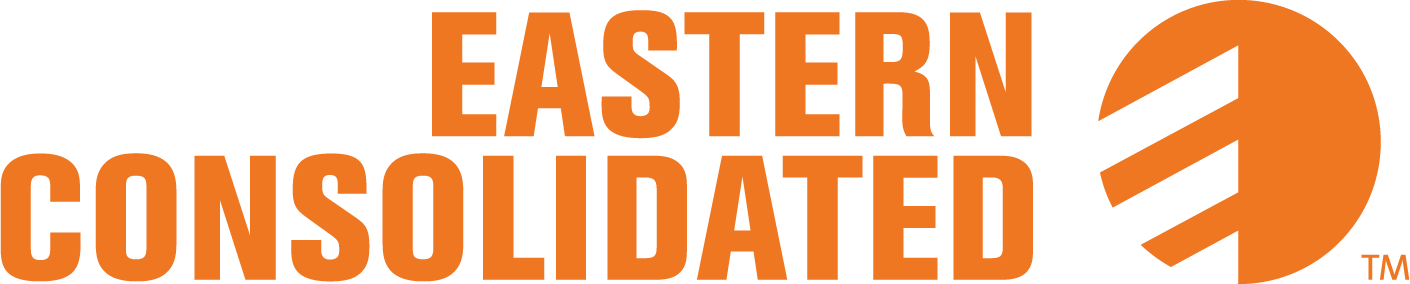
- Industry: Real estate
- Founded: 1981; 45 years ago
- Founder: Peter Hauspurg; Daun Paris
- Defunct: July 2018; 8 years ago
- Fate: Shut down
- Headquarters: Manhattan
- Services: Brokerage firm
- Website: www.easternconsolidated.com

Eastern Consolidated was a commercial real estate brokerage firm that primarily operated in New York City. The company was shut down in 2018.

== History ==
In 1981, the company was founded by Peter Hauspurg and Daun Paris. The co-founders married in 1983.

In 1982, the company brokered the sale of the Lowell Hotel.

In 1993, Brian Ezratty, a broker with the company, negotiated the sale of the Ed Sullivan Theater and Office Building at 1697 Broadway to CBS for $4.255 million, providing studio space for the Late Show with David Letterman. Ezratty received REBNY's Deal of the Year award for the transaction.

On behalf of the Durst Organization, the company brokered the sale of the Americas Tower (1177 Avenue of the Americas), a 1,001,000 SF, 50-story midtown office building built in 1993.

In April 1998, the company brokered the sale of the Eden Roc Miami Beach Hotel, the signature hotel designed by Morris Lapidus that opened in 1954.

In February 2007, the company represented the seller in the sale of a building in Albany, New York for $9.75 million.

In November 2013, the company launched a retail leasing division.

In September 2014, the company represented the seller in the sale of a building in Albany, New York for $33 million.

In April 2015, the company brokered the sale of The Coda, a rental building on the Lower East Side, and two other buildings for $50 million.

In May 2015, the company acquired Prospect Capital Group.

In August 2016, the company represented the seller in the sale of a parcel in Brooklyn for $5.75 million.

In March 2017, the company represented the seller in the sale of 2 buildings in Brooklyn for $25 million.

In May 2017, the company represented 3 sellers, including Extell Development Company, in their sale of 3 redevelopment sites in Manhattan to Rockefeller Group for $100 million.

In June 2017, the company represented the seller in the sale of a vacant building in Boston for $63.25 million.

In July 2018, the company shut down.
