= TUHS =

TUHS may refer to:

- Taft Union High School, Taft, California
- Talent Unlimited High School, New York, New York, United States
- Tamalpais Union High School, Mill Valley, California, which was renamed Tamalpais High School in 1951, when a second school was opened in the Tamalpais Union High School District
- Temple University Health System, see Temple University Hospital
- The Unix Heritage Society, a community trying to preserve the historical UNIX operating systems and their heritage
- Tolleson Union High School, Tolleson, Arizona, United States
- Tualatin High School, Tualatin, Oregon, United States
- Tulare Union High School, Tulare, California, United States
