= Upper East Side =

- Neighborhood of Manhattan
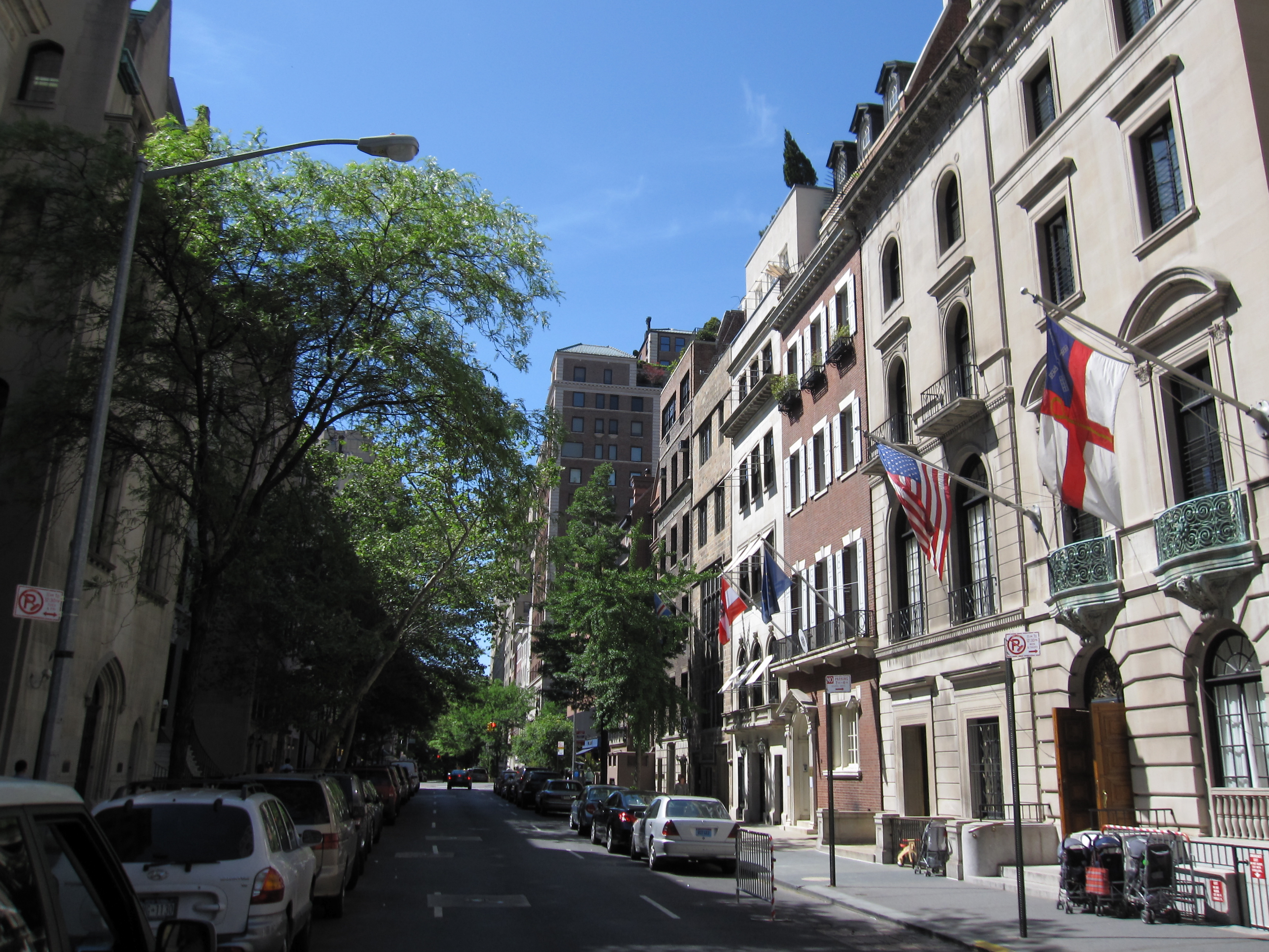
- East 69th Street between Park and Madison Avenues in the Upper East Side Historic District
- Nickname: UES
- Location in New York City
- Coordinates: 40.769°N 73.966°W
- Country: United States
- State: New York
- City: New York City
- Borough: Manhattan
- Community District: Manhattan 8

Area
  - Total: 1.76 sq mi (4.6 km^{2})

Population (2020)
  - Total: 183,986
  - Density: 105,000/sq mi (40,400/km^{2})

Ethnicity
  - White: 79.0%
  - Asian: 8.6%
  - Hispanic: 7.1%
  - Black: 3.2%
  - Others: 2.2%

Economics
  - Median income: $131,492
- Time zone: UTC−05:00 (Eastern)
  - Summer (DST): UTC−04:00 (EDT)
- ZIP Codes: 10021, 10028, 10065, 10075, 10128
- Area code: 212, 332, 646, and 917

The Upper East Side (sometimes abbreviated UES) is a neighborhood in the borough of Manhattan in New York City. It is bounded approximately by 96th Street to the north, the East River to the east, 59th Street to the south, and Central Park and Fifth Avenue to the west. The neighborhood area incorporates several smaller neighborhoods, including Lenox Hill, Carnegie Hill, and Yorkville. Once known as the Silk Stocking District, it has long been the wealthiest neighborhood in New York City.

The Upper East Side is part of Manhattan Community District 8, and its primary ZIP Codes are 10021, 10028, 10065, 10075, and 10128. It is patrolled by the 19th Precinct of the New York City Police Department.

== Geography ==
Neighborhood boundaries in New York City are not officially set, but according to the Encyclopedia of New York City, the Upper East Side is bounded by 59th Street in the south, 96th Street on the north, Fifth Avenue to the west, and the East River to the east. The AIA Guide to New York City extends the northern boundary to 106th Street near Fifth Avenue.

The area's north–south avenues are Fifth, Madison, Park, Lexington, Third, Second, First, York, and East End Avenues, with the latter running only from East 79th Street to East 90th Street. The major east–west streets are 59th Street, 72nd Street, 79th Street, 86th Street, and 96th Street.

Some real-estate agents use the term "Upper East Side", instead of "East Harlem", to describe areas that are slightly north of 96th Street and near Fifth Avenue, in order to avoid associating these areas with the negative connotations of the latter, a neighborhood which is generally perceived as less prestigious.

=== Historic districts ===
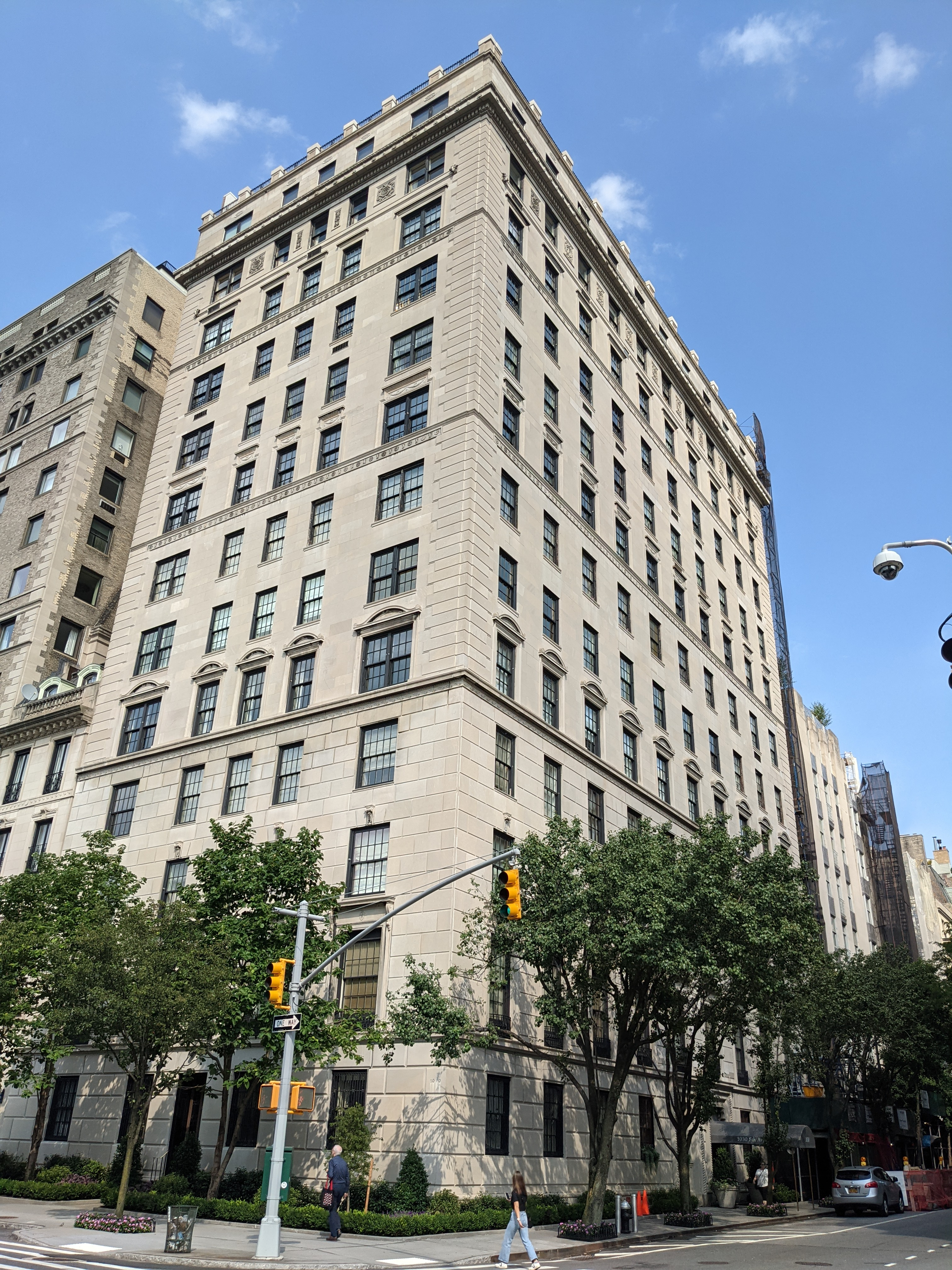
The Metropolitan Museum Historic District, designed in 1977

The Upper East Side Historic District was designated as a city district in 1981 and listed on the National Register of Historic Places in 1984. The city district runs from 59th to 78th Streets along Fifth Avenue, and up to Third Avenue at some points. It is composed of residential structures built after the American Civil War; mansions and townhouses built at the beginning of the 20th century; and apartment buildings erected later on. The city district was slightly expanded in 2010 with 74 additional buildings.

The Metropolitan Museum Historic District was designated a city district in 1977. It consists of properties on Fifth Avenue between 79th and 86th Streets, outside the Metropolitan Museum of Art, as well as properties on several side streets.

The Park Avenue Historic District was designated a city district in 2014. It encompasses 64 properties on Park Avenue between 79th and 91st Streets.

The Carnegie Hill Historic District was designated a city district in 1974 and expanded in 1993. It covers 400 buildings, primarily along Fifth Avenue from 86th to 98th Street, as well as on side streets extending east to Madison, Park, and Lexington Avenues.

There are also two smaller city historic districts. The Henderson Place Historic District, designated in 1969, comprises the town houses on East End Avenue between 86th and 87th Streets, built by John C. Henderson in 1981. The Treadwell Farm Historic District, designated in 1967, includes low-rise apartments on East 61st and 62nd Streets between Second and Third Avenues, on the former farm of Adam Treadwell.

== History ==
=== Development ===
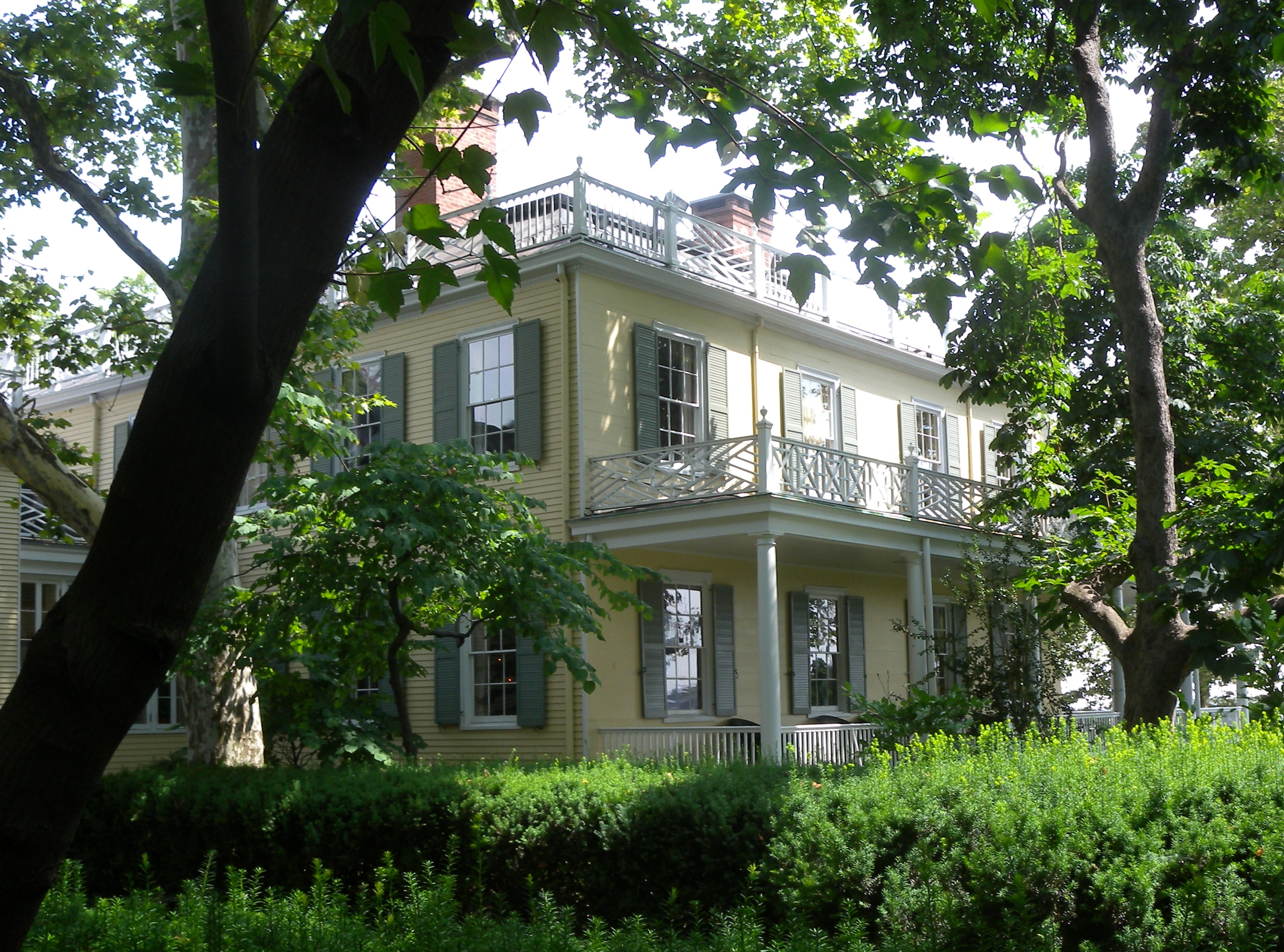
Gracie Mansion, the official residence of the Mayor of New York City and the city's last remaining East River villa

Before the arrival of Europeans, the mouths of streams that eroded gullies in the East River bluffs are conjectured to have been the sites of fishing camps used by the Lenape, whose controlled burns once a generation or so kept the dense canopy of oak–hickory forest open at ground level.

In the 19th century (Note: The history of the Upper East Side, in the broader citywide context, is repeatedly noted in Burrows, Edwin G. and Wallace, Mike (1999). Gotham: A History of New York City to 1898. New York: Oxford University Press. ISBN 0-195-11634-8.) the farmland and market garden district of what was to be the Upper East Side was still traversed by the Boston Post Road and, from 1837, the New York and Harlem Railroad, which brought straggling commercial development around its one station in the neighborhood, at 86th Street, which became the heart of German Yorkville. The area was defined by the attractions of the bluff overlooking the East River, which ran without interruption from James William Beekman's "Mount Pleasant", north of the marshy squalor of Turtle Bay, to Gracie Mansion, north of which the land sloped steeply to the wetlands that separated this area from the suburban village of Harlem. Among the series of villas a Schermerhorn country house overlooked the river at the foot of present-day 73rd Street and another, Peter Schermerhorn's at 66th Street, and the Riker homestead was similarly sited at the foot of 75th Street. By the mid-19th century the farmland had largely been subdivided, with the exception of the 150 acres (61 ha) of Jones's Wood, stretching from 66th to 76th Streets and from the Old Post Road (Third Avenue) to the river (Note: Jones's Wood, owned by the Joneses and their Schermerhorn cousins and operated as a popular beer-garden resort, was briefly touted as a possible location for a public park before Central Park was established) and the farmland inherited by James Lenox, who divided it into blocks of houselots in the 1870s, built his Lenox Library on a Fifth Avenue lot at the farm's south-west corner, and donated a full square block for the Presbyterian Hospital, between 70th and 71st Streets, and Madison and Park Avenues. At that time, along the Boston Post Road taverns stood at the mile-markers, Five-Mile House at 72nd Street and Six-Mile House at 97th, a New Yorker recalled in 1893.

The fashionable future of the narrow strip between Central Park and the railroad cut was established at the outset by the nature of its entrance, in the southwest corner, north of the Vanderbilt family's favored stretch of Fifth Avenue from 50th to 59th Streets. A row of handsome townhouses was built on speculation by Mary Mason Jones, who owned the entire block bounded by 57th and 58th Streets and Fifth and Madison. In 1870 she occupied the prominent corner house at 57th and Fifth, though not in the isolation described by her niece, Edith Wharton, whose picture has been uncritically accepted as history, as Christopher Gray has pointed out:

It was her habit to sit in a window of her sitting room on the ground floor, as if watching calmly for life and fashion to flow northward to her solitary door... She was sure that presently the quarries, the wooden greenhouses in ragged gardens, the rocks from which goats surveyed the scene, would vanish before the advance of residences as stately as her own.

— Edith Wharton

=== Arrival of famous residents ===
Before the Park Avenue Tunnel was covered (finished in 1910), fashionable New Yorkers shunned the smoky railroad trench up Fourth Avenue (now Park Avenue), to build stylish mansions and townhouses on the large lots along Fifth Avenue, facing Central Park, and on the adjacent side streets. The latest arrivals were the rich Pittsburghers Andrew Carnegie and Henry Clay Frick. The classic phase of Gilded Age Fifth Avenue as a stretch of private mansions was not long-lasting: the first apartment house to replace a private mansion on upper Fifth Avenue was 907 Fifth Avenue (1916), at 72nd Street, the neighborhood's grand carriage entrance to Central Park.

Most members of New York's upper-class families have made residences on the Upper East Side, including the oil-rich Rockefellers, political Roosevelts, political dynastic Kennedys, thoroughbred racing moneyed Whitneys, and tobacco and electric power fortuned Dukes.

=== Transportation constructed ===
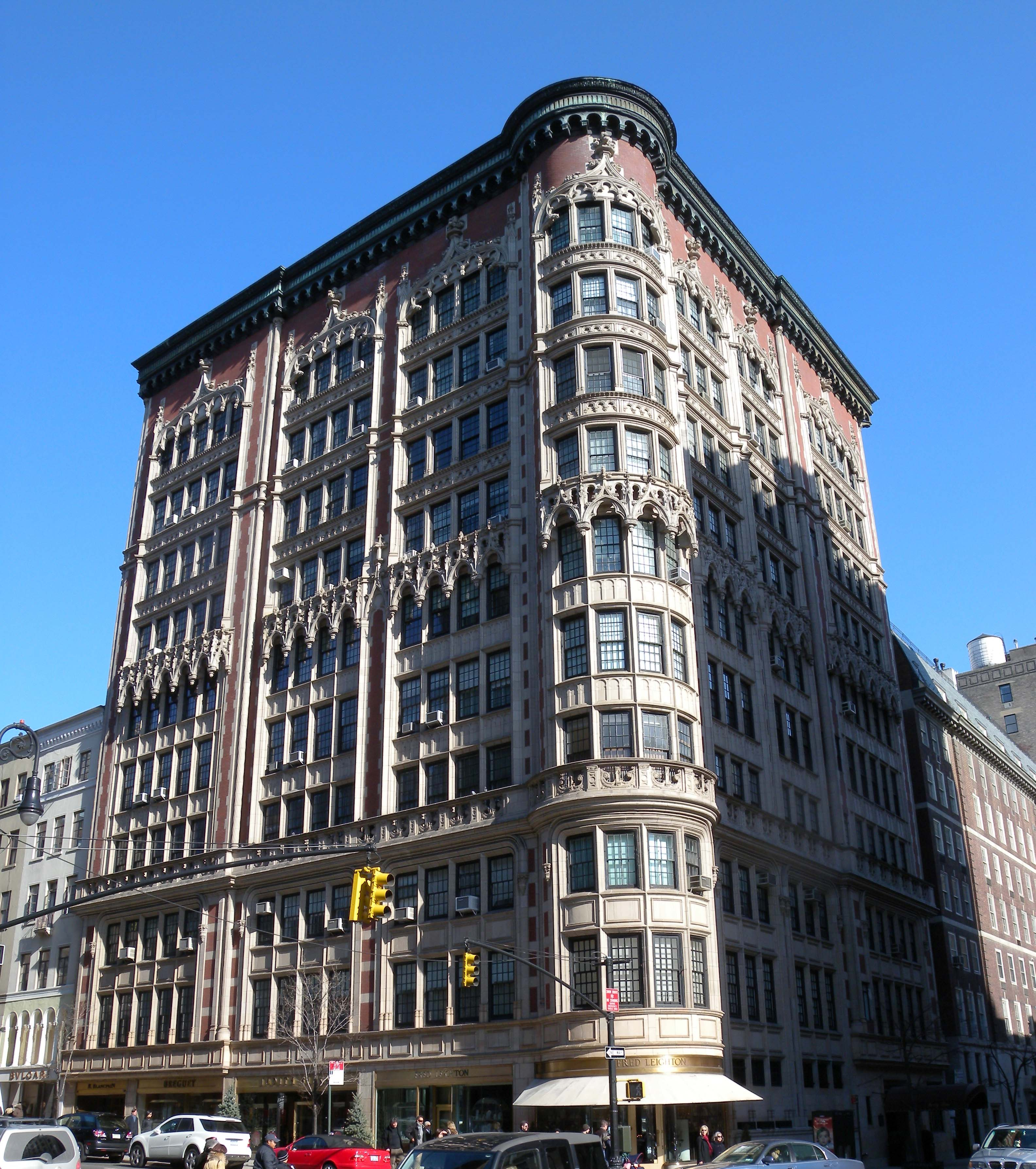
45 East 66th Street, a designated New York City landmark, as seen from Madison Avenue

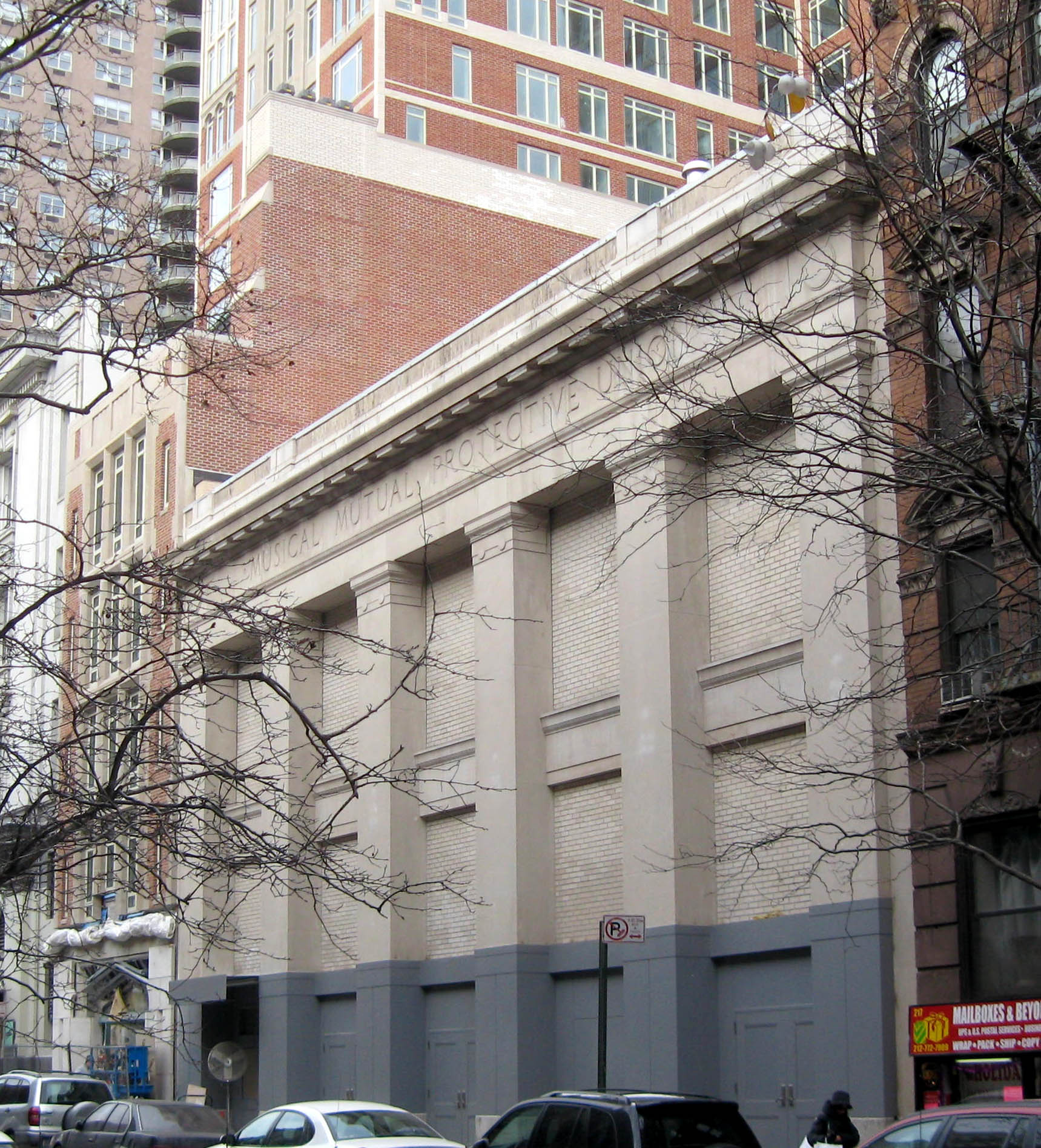
The Musical Mutual Protective Union on 85th Street

Construction of the Third Avenue El, opened from 1878 in sections, followed by the Second Avenue El, opened in 1879, linked the Upper East Side's middle class and skilled artisans closely to the heart of the city, and confirmed the modest nature of the area to their east. The unbuilt "Hamilton Square", which had appeared as one of the few genteel interruptions of the grid plan on city maps since the Commissioners' Plan of 1811, was intended to straddle what had now become the Harlem Railroad right-of-way between 66th and 69th Streets; it never materialized, though during the Panic of 1857 its unleveled ground was the scene of an open-air mass meeting called in July to agitate for the secession of the city and its neighboring counties from New York State, and the city divided its acreage into house lots and sold them. From the 1880s the neighborhood of Yorkville became a suburb of middle class Germans.

Gracie Mansion, the last remaining suburban villa overlooking the East River at Carl Schurz Park, became the home of New York's mayor in 1942. The East River Drive, designed by Robert Moses, was extended south from the first section, from 125th Street to 92nd Street, which was completed in 1934 as a boulevard, an arterial highway running at street level; reconstruction designs from 1948 to 1966 converted FDR Drive, as it was renamed after Franklin Delano Roosevelt, into the full limited-access parkway that is in use today.

Demolishing the elevated railways on Third and Second Avenues opened these tenement-lined streets to the construction of high-rise apartment blocks starting in the 1950s. Among these were Manhattan House at 200 East 66th Street, one of the first apartment buildings in New York City to use white glazed brick on its facade, as well as the Sutton Terrace development on Sutton Place. The demolition of the els had an adverse effect on transportation, because the IRT Lexington Avenue Line was now the only subway line in the area. The construction of the Second Avenue Subway was originally proposed in 1919. Finally, on January 1, 2017, the first phase of the line was completed with the opening of three new stations. This brought in new local business to the area and had positive impact on real estate prices on the Upper East Side.

== Demographics ==
Historical population
Year	Pop.	±%
1990	201,571	—
2000	207,543	+3.0%
2010	208,259	+0.3%
2020	220,261	+5.8%

For census purposes, the New York City government classifies the Upper East Side as part of three neighborhood tabulation areas: Upper East Side-Carnegie Hill, Yorkville, and Lenox Hill-Roosevelt Island, divided by Third Avenue and 77th Street. (Note: Figures for Lenox Hill are tabulated alongside those for Roosevelt Island, and so Lenox Hill's precise population cannot be ascertained on its own.) Based on data from the 2010 United States census, the combined population of these areas was 219,920, an increase of 2,857 (1.3%) from the 217,063 counted in 2000. Covering an area of 1,291.51 acres (522.66 ha), the neighborhoods had a population density of 170.3 inhabitants per acre (109,000/sq mi; 42,100/km^{2}).

The racial makeup of the neighborhoods was 79% (173,711) White, 3.2% (7,098) African American, 0.1% (126) Native American, 8.6% (18,847) Asian, 0% (98) Pacific Islander, 0.3% (609) from other races, and 1.8% (3,868) from two or more races. Hispanic or Latino of any race was 7.1% (15,563) of the population. While the White population is a dominating majority in all three census tabulation areas, it is more so in Upper East Side-Carnegie Hill compared to Yorkville and Lenox Hill-Roosevelt Island, being close to 90% of the population.

The racial composition of the Upper East Side changed moderately from 2000 to 2010. The most significant changes were the increase in the Asian population by 38% (5,145), the increase in the Hispanic/Latino population by 19% (2,537), and the decrease in the White population by 3% (5,644). The small Black population increased by 3% (191), while the even smaller population of all other races increased by 15% (628). Taking into account the three census tabulation areas, the decrease of the White population was concentrated in Yorkville and Upper East Side-Carnegie Hill especially, while the increases of the other racial groups were evenly split across the three areas.

The entirety of Manhattan Community District 8, which comprises the Upper East Side and Roosevelt Island, had 225,914 inhabitants as of NYC Health's 2018 Community Health Profile, with an average life expectancy of 85.9 years. This is higher than the median life expectancy of 81.2 for all New York City neighborhoods. Most inhabitants are adults: a plurality (37%) are between the ages of 25–44, while 24% are between 45 and 64, and 20% are 65 or older. The ratio of youth and college-aged residents was lower, at 14% and 5% respectively.

As of 2017, the median household income in Community District 8 was $123,894, though the median income on the Upper East Side individually was $131,492. In 2018, an estimated 7% of Community District 8 residents lived in poverty, compared to 14% in all of Manhattan and 20% in all of New York City. One in twenty-five residents (4%) were unemployed, compared to 7% in Manhattan and 9% in New York City. Rent burden, or the percentage of residents who have difficulty paying their rent, is 41% in Community District 8, compared to the boroughwide and citywide rates of 45% and 51% respectively. Based on this calculation, as of 2018, Community District 8 is not considered to be gentrifying: according to the Community Health Profile, the district was not low-income in 1990.

=== Ethnic and socioeconomic trends ===
As of the 2000 census, twenty-one percent of the population was foreign born; of this, 45.6% came from Europe, 29.5% from Asia, 16.2% from Latin America and 8.7% from other areas. The female-male ratio was very high with 125 females for 100 males. The Upper East Side contains a large and affluent Jewish population estimated at 56,000. Traditionally, the Upper East Side has been dominated by wealthy White Anglo-Saxon Protestant families.

Given its very high population density and per capita income ($85,081 in 2000), the neighborhood contains the greatest concentration of individual wealth in Manhattan. As of 2011, the median household income for the Upper East Side was $131,492. The Upper East Side maintains the highest pricing per square foot in the United States. A 2002 report cited the average cost per square meter as $8,856; however, that price has seen a substantial jump, increasing to almost as much as $11,200 per square meter as of 2006. There are some buildings which cost about $125 per square foot (~$1345/ m^{2}). The only public housing projects for those of low to moderate incomes on the Upper East Side are located just south of the neighborhood's northern limit at 96th Street, the Holmes Towers and Isaacs Houses. It borders East Harlem, which has the highest concentration of public housing in the United States.

=== Politics ===
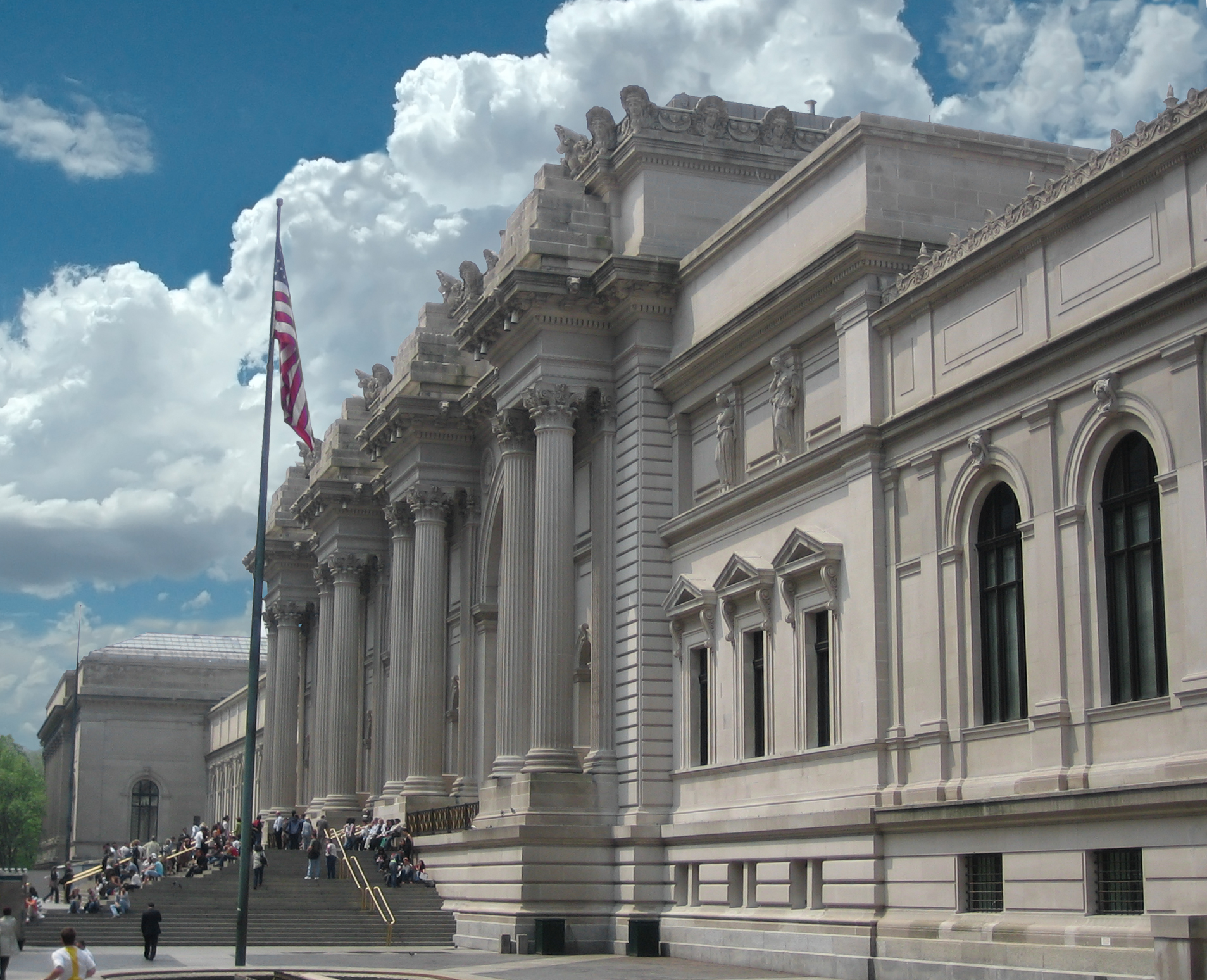
The Metropolitan Museum of Art at Fifth Avenue and 82nd Street

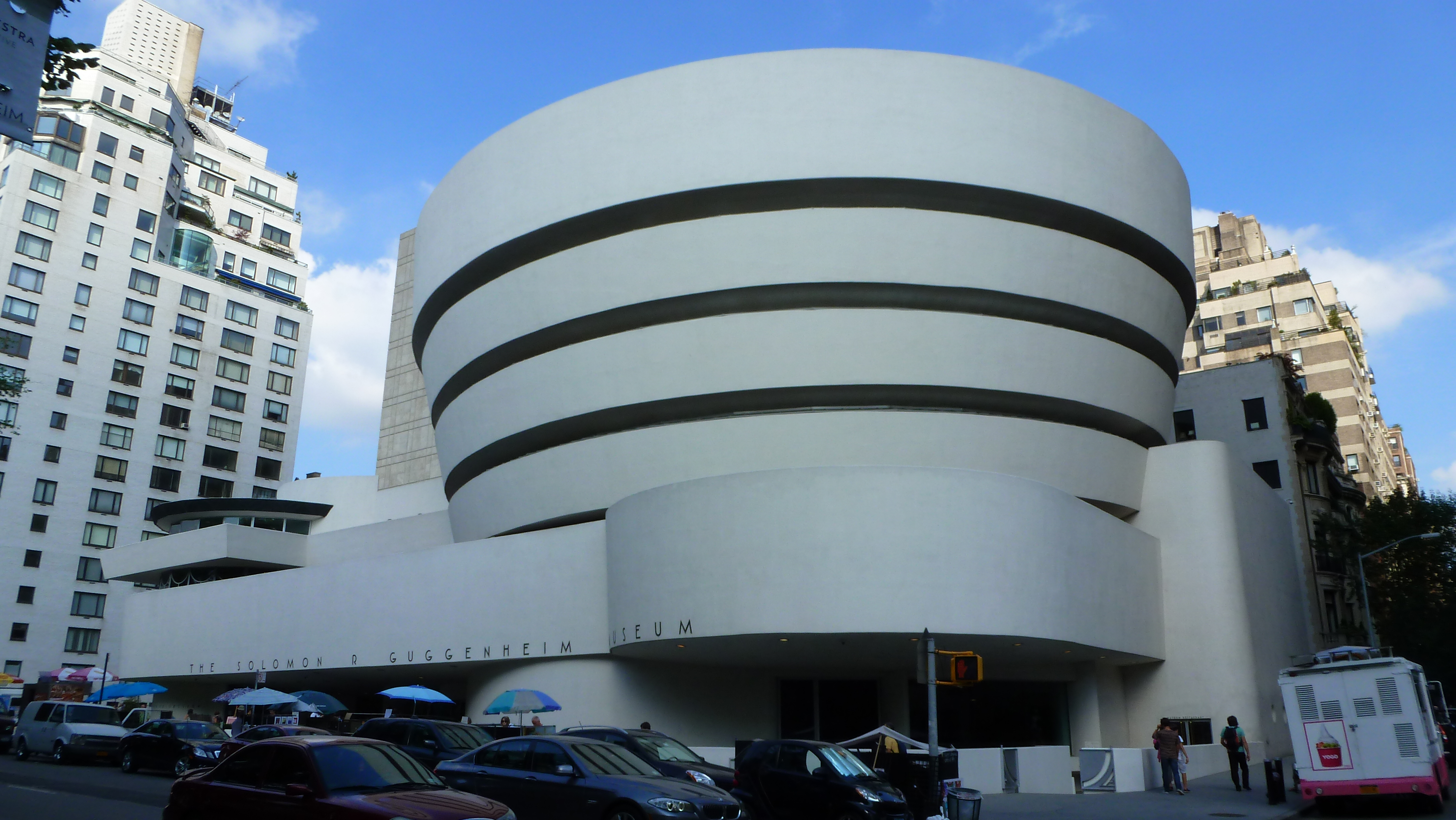
The Solomon R. Guggenheim Museum at Fifth Avenue and 89th Street

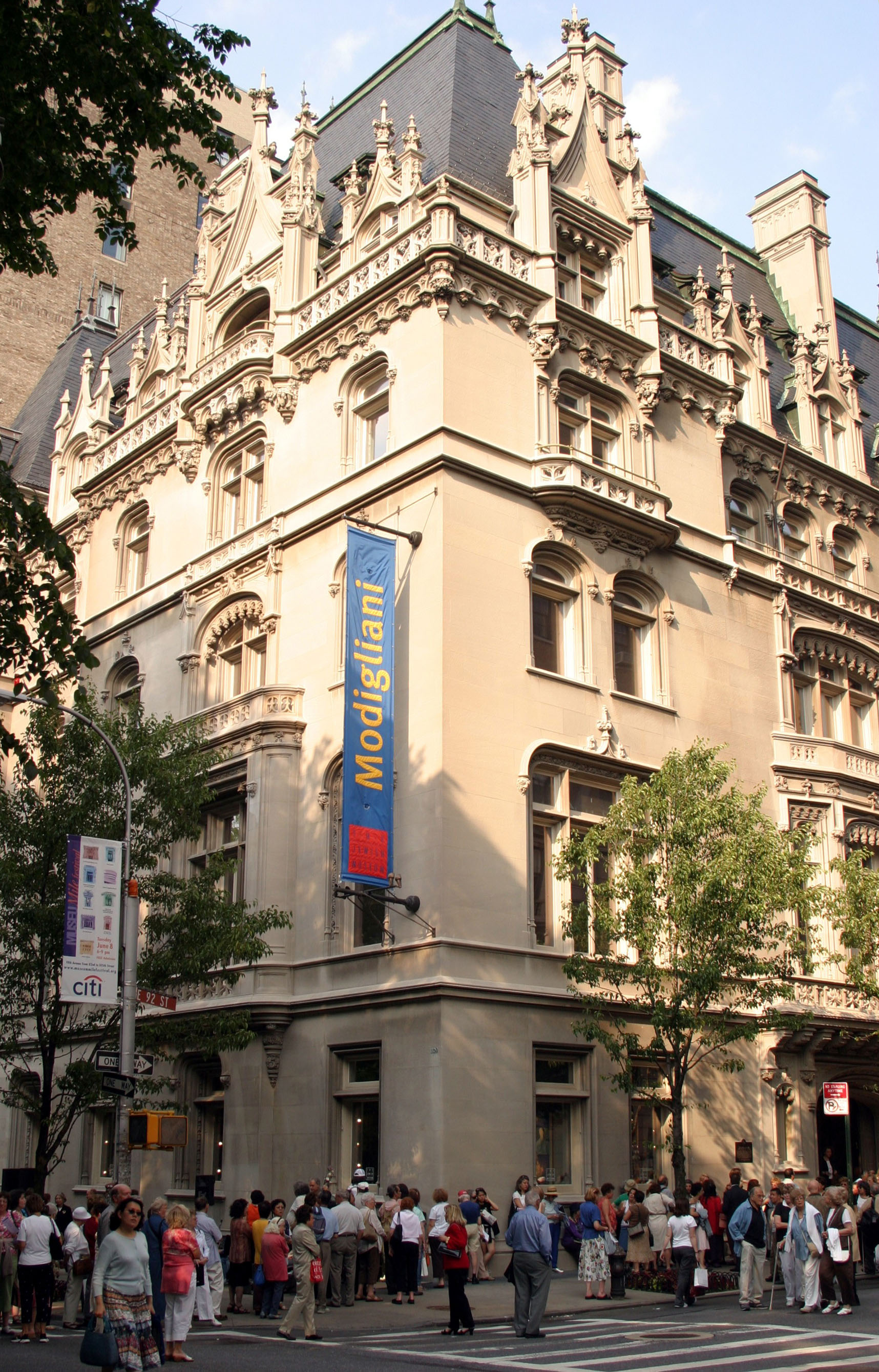
The Museum Mile Festival at the Jewish Museum on Fifth Avenue at 92nd Street

Politically, the Upper East Side is in New York's 12th congressional district, which has a Cook PVI of D+34 and is currently represented by Democrat Jerry Nadler. It is in the New York State Senate's 27th, 28th, and 29th districts, the New York State Assembly's 73rd and 76th districts, and the New York City Council's 4th and 5th districts.

The Upper East Side is one of few areas of Manhattan where Republicans constitute more than 20% of the electorate. In the southwestern part of the neighborhood, Republican voters equal Democratic voters (the only such area in Manhattan), whereas in the rest of the neighborhood Republicans make up between 20 and 40% of registered voters. Nonetheless, it is still heavily Democratic; in the 2020 presidential election, every single precinct voted for Joe Biden and all but one gave him over 70% of the vote.

The Upper East Side is notable as a significant location of political fundraising in the United States. Four of the top five ZIP Codes in the nation for political contributions are in Manhattan. The top ZIP Code, 10021, is on the Upper East Side and generated the most money for the 2004 presidential campaigns of both George W. Bush and John Kerry.

== Landmarks and cultural institutions ==
=== Museums ===
The area is home to some of the most famous museums in the world. The string of museums along Fifth Avenue fronting Central Park has been dubbed "Museum Mile", running between 82nd and 105th Streets. It was once named "Millionaire's Row". The following are among the cultural institutions on the Upper East Side:

- 92nd Street Y
- Asia Society
- Colony Club
- Andrew Carnegie Mansion, which houses the Cooper–Hewitt, National Design Museum
- Henry Clay Frick House, which houses the Frick Collection
- Frick Madison
- Goethe-Institut, New York
- Solomon R. Guggenheim Museum
- Irish Georgian Society
- Jewish Museum of New York
- Metropolitan Museum of Art
- El Museo del Barrio
- Museum of the City of New York
- National Academy of Design
- Neue Galerie
- Park Avenue Armory
- Society of Illustrators

=== Art galleries ===
- Acquavella Galleries
- Kraushaar Galleries
- Katharina Rich Perlow Gallery
- Salon 94
- Anita Shapolsky Gallery

=== Hotels (partial list) ===
- Carlyle Hotel
- Affinia Gardens NYC
- The Mark Hotel
- The Pierre
- The Lowell Hotel
- The Surrey
- The Sherry-Netherland

=== Diplomatic missions ===
Many diplomatic missions are located in former mansions on the Upper East Side:

- The Consulate-General of Austria in New York is located at 31 East 69th Street, between Park Avenue and Madison Avenue.
- The Consulate-General of France in New York is located at 934 Fifth Avenue between 74th Street and 75th Street.
- The Consulate-General of Greece in New York is located at 69 East 79th Street, occupying the former George L. Rives residence.
- The Consulate-General of Italy in New York is located at 690 Park Avenue.
- The Consulate-General of India in New York is located at 3 East 64th Street between Fifth Avenue and Madison Avenue.
- The Consulate-General of Indonesia in New York is located at 5 East 68th Street between Fifth Avenue and Madison Avenue.
- The Consulate-General of Lebanon in New York is located at 9 East 76th Street between Fifth Avenue and Madison Avenue.
- The Consulate-General of Pakistan in New York is located at 12 East 65th Street.
- The Consulate-General of Russia in New York is located at the John Henry Hammond House at 9 East 91st Street between Fifth Avenue and Madison Avenue.

Other missions to the United Nations on the Upper East Side include:

- Albania
- Belarus
- Bulgaria
- Cameroon
- Cape Verde
- Iraq
- Mali
- Mongolia
- Myanmar (Burma)
- Pakistan
- Russia
- Somalia

=== Historic districts ===
There are several historic districts on the Upper East Side, including:

- The Carnegie Hill Historic District, a city landmark district, which covers 400 buildings, primarily along Fifth Avenue from 86th to 98th Street, as well as on side streets extending east to Madison, Park, and Lexington Avenues.
- The First Avenue Estate, a city and NRHP district consisting of a full city block of tenements between First Avenue, 65th Street, York Avenue, and 64th Street.
- The Metropolitan Museum Historic District, a city landmark district, which consists of properties on Fifth Avenue between 79th and 86th Streets, outside the Metropolitan Museum of Art, as well as properties on several side streets.
- The Upper East Side Historic District, a city and NRHP district. The city district runs from 59th to 78th Streets along Fifth Avenue, and up to Third Avenue at some points.
- The York Avenue Estate, a city and NRHP district consisting of a full city block of tenements between FDR Drive, 79th Street, York Avenue, and 78th Street.

== Religious ==
Christian houses of worship:

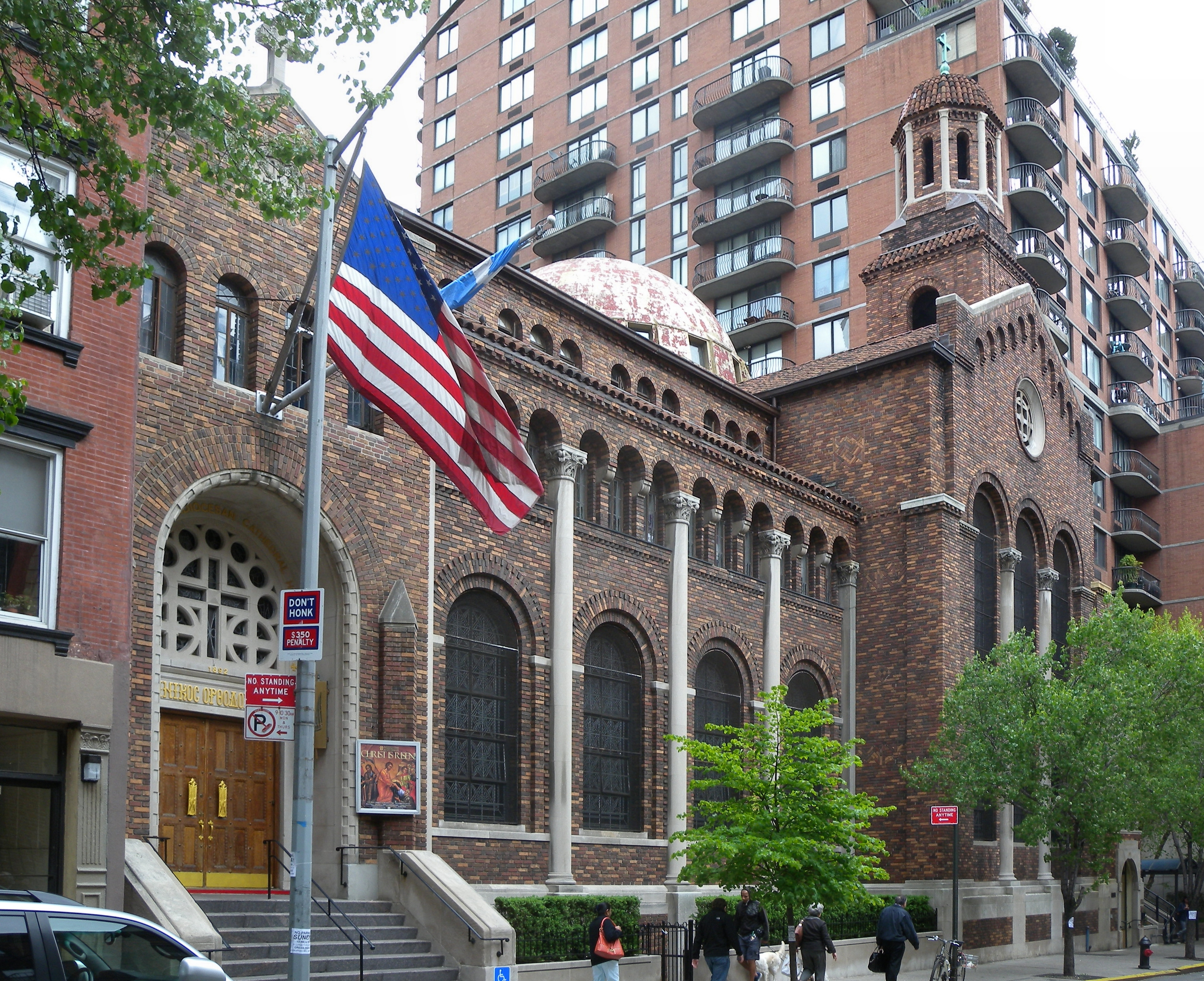
The Archdiocesan Cathedral of the Holy Trinity on East 74th Street

- Archdiocesan Cathedral of the Holy Trinity, Greek Orthodox Church
- Brick Presbyterian Church
- Central Presbyterian Church
- Christ Church United Methodist
- Church of the Epiphany, Episcopal church
- Church of the Heavenly Rest, Episcopal church
- Church of the Resurrection
- First Hungarian Reformed Church of New York
- Holy Trinity Episcopal Church
- St. Ignatius Loyola, Catholic Church
- Jan Hus Presbyterian Church
- Kingdom Hall of Jehovah's Witnesses (1499 1st Avenue at East 78th Street)
- Madison Avenue Presbyterian Church
- Our Lady of Good Counsel Church
- Park Avenue Christian Church, Disciples of Christ church
- Redeemer Presbyterian Church
- St. Ann's Church, Catholic Church
- St. James' Episcopal Church
- St. Jean Baptiste Church, Catholic Church at 76th & Lex
- St. John the Martyr's Church, Catholic Church
- St. Thomas More Roman Catholic Church
- Third Church of Christ, Scientist
- Unitarian Church of All Souls
- Zion-St. Mark's Evangelical Lutheran Church

Jewish houses of worship:

- Congregation Kehilath Jeshurun, Modern Orthodox synagogue
- Congregation Or Zarua, Conservative synagogue
- Edmond J. Safra Synagogue, Orthodox Sephardic synagogue
- Fifth Avenue Synagogue, Orthodox synagogue
- Park Avenue Synagogue, Conservative Jewish synagogue
- Park East Synagogue, Orthodox synagogue
- Temple Emanu-El, Reform synagogue
- Temple Israel, Reform synagogue
- Temple Shaaray Tefila, Reform synagogue

Muslim houses of worship:

- Islamic Cultural Center of New York, mosque

== Police and crime ==
The Upper East Side is patrolled by the 19th Precinct of the NYPD, located at 153 East 67th Street. The 19th Precinct has a lower crime rate than in the 1990s, with crimes across all categories having decreased by 82.2% between 1990 and 2022. The precinct reported 2 murders, 12 rapes, 229 robberies, 173 felony assaults, 278 burglaries, 1,724 grand larcenies, and 192 grand larcenies auto in 2022.

As of 2018, Manhattan Community District 8 has a non-fatal assault hospitalization rate of 15 per 100,000 people, compared to the boroughwide rate of 49 per 100,000 and the citywide rate of 59 per 100,000. Its incarceration rate is 71 per 100,000 people, the lowest in the city, compared to the boroughwide rate of 407 per 100,000 and the citywide rate of 425 per 100,000. Of the five major violent felonies (murder, rape, felony assault, robbery, and burglary), the 19th Precinct had a rate of 264 crimes per 100,000 residents in 2019, compared to the boroughwide average of 632 crimes per 100,000 and the citywide average of 572 crimes per 100,000.

In 2019, the highest concentration of felony assaults on the Upper East Side was near the intersection of 93rd Street and First Avenue, where there were 10 felony assaults. The highest concentration of robberies, on the other hand, was near the intersection of 86th Street and Lexington Avenue, where there were 19 robberies.

== Fire safety ==
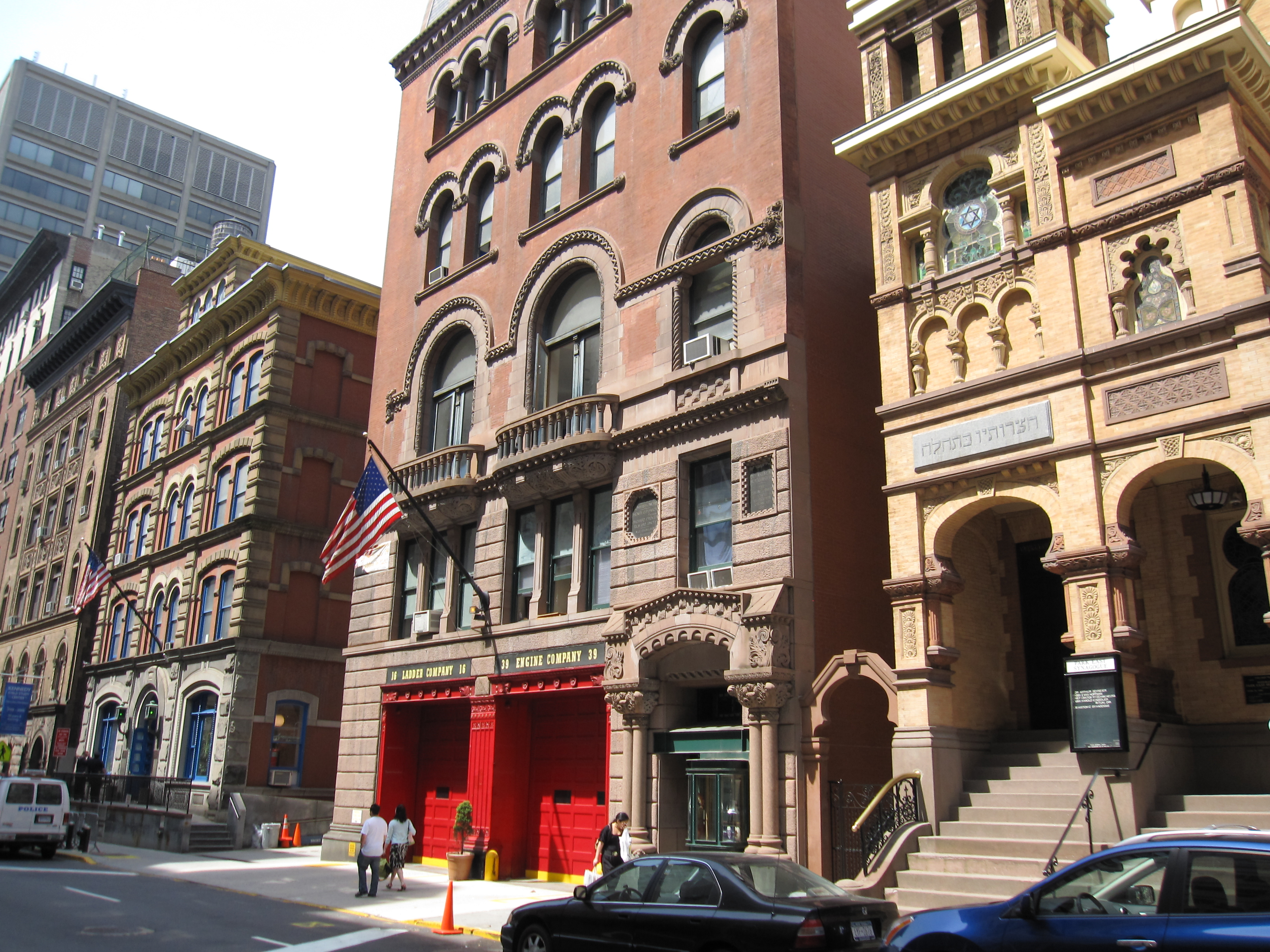
FDNY Engine Company 39 and Ladder Company 16 on East 67th Street

The Upper East Side is served by multiple New York City Fire Department (FDNY) fire stations:

- Engine Company 39/Ladder Company 16 – 157 East 67th Street
- Engine Company 44 – 221 East 75th Street
- Engine Company 22/Ladder Company 13/Battalion 10 – 159 East 85th Street

== Health ==
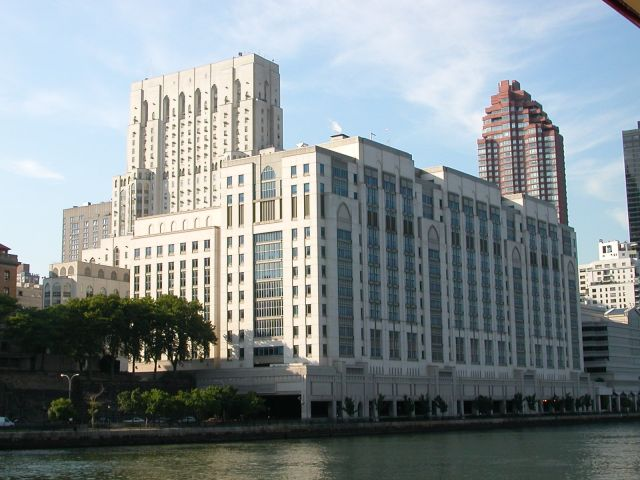
Weill Cornell Medical Center on East 68th Street

As of 2018, preterm births and births to teenage mothers on the Upper East Side are lower than the city average. On the Upper East Side, there were 73 preterm births per 1,000 live births (compared to 87 per 1,000 citywide), and 3.4 births to teenage mothers per 1,000 live births (compared to 19.3 per 1,000 citywide). The Upper East Side has a low population of residents who are uninsured. In 2018, this population of uninsured residents was estimated to be 4%, less than the citywide rate of 12%, though this was based on a small sample size.

The concentration of fine particulate matter, the deadliest type of air pollutant, on the Upper East Side is 0.0083 milligrams per cubic metre (8.3×10^{−9} oz/ft^{3}), more than the city average. Eight percent of Upper East Side residents are smokers, which is less than the city average of 14% of residents being smokers. On the Upper East Side, 11% of residents are obese, 4% are diabetic, and 15% have high blood pressure—compared to the citywide averages of 24%, 11%, and 28% respectively. In addition, 6% of children are obese, compared to the citywide average of 20%.

Ninety-four percent of residents eat some fruits and vegetables every day, which is higher than the city's average of 87%. In 2018, 89% of residents described their health as "good", "very good", or "excellent", more than the city's average of 78%. For every supermarket on the Upper East Side, there are 5 bodegas.

Lenox Hill Hospital, NewYork-Presbyterian Hospital, and Weill Cornell Medical Center are located on the Upper East Side. In addition, Mount Sinai Hospital and Metropolitan Hospital Center are located nearby in East Harlem.

== Post offices and ZIP Codes ==
The Upper East Side is located in five primary ZIP Codes. From south to north, they are 10065 (south of 69th Street), 10021 (between 69th and 76th Streets), 10075 (between 76th and 80th Streets), 10028 (between 80th and 86th Streets), and 10128 (north of 86th Street). In addition, 500 East 77th Street in Yorkville has its own ZIP Code, 10162. If the AIA Guide's broader definition of the neighborhood (extending up to Fifth Avenue and 106th Streets) is considered, then the neighborhood has an additional ZIP Code of 10029, along Fifth Avenue between 96th and 105th Streets. The United States Postal Service operates four post offices on the Upper East Side:

- Cherokee Station – 1483 York Avenue
- Gracie Station – 229 East 85th Street
- Lenox Hill Station – 221 East 70th Street
- Yorkville Station – 1617 Third Avenue

== Education ==
The Upper East Side generally has a higher rate of college-educated residents than the rest of the city as of 2018. A majority of residents age 25 and older (83%) have a college education or higher, while 3% have less than a high school education and 14% are high school graduates or have some college education. By contrast, 64% of Manhattan residents and 43% of city residents have a college education or higher. The percentage of the Upper East Side students excelling in math rose from 61% in 2000 to 80% in 2011, and reading achievement increased from 66% to 68% during the same time period.

The Upper East Side's rate of elementary school student absenteeism is lower than the rest of New York City. On the Upper East Side, 8% of elementary school students missed twenty or more days per school year, less than the citywide average of 20%. Additionally, 91% of high school students on the Upper East Side graduate on time, more than the citywide average of 75%.

=== Primary and secondary schools ===
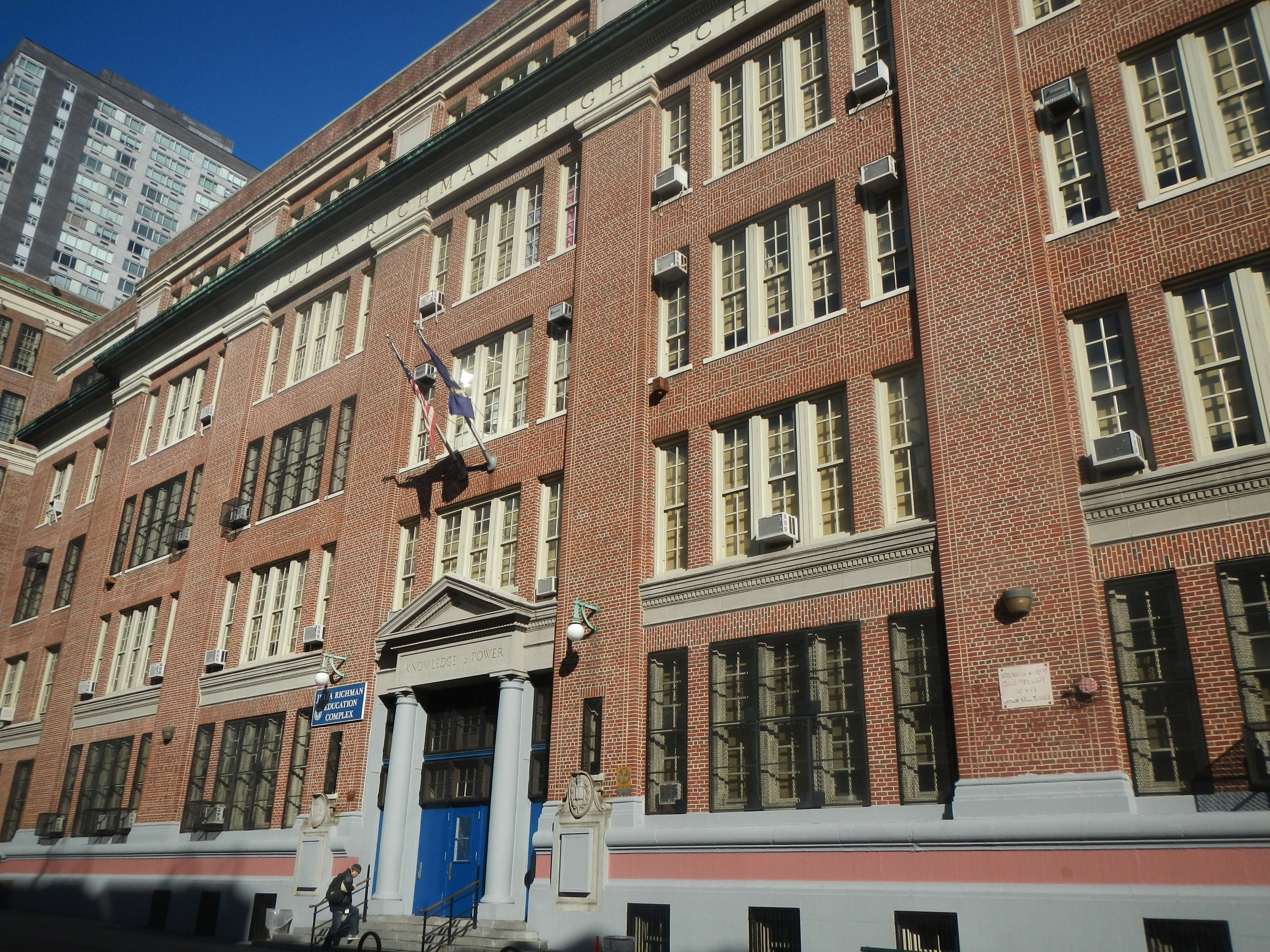
Urban Academy Laboratory High School in the Julia Richman Education Complex

==== Public schools ====
The New York City Department of Education operates public schools in the city.

Public lower and middle schools

- PS 6 – Lillie Devereux Blake School
- PS 77 – The Lower Lab school
- PS 158 – Bayard Taylor
- PS 183 – Robert Louis Stevenson School
- PS 267 – East Side Elementary
- PS 290 – The New School of Manhattan
- MS 114 – East Side Middle School
- JHS 167 – Senator Robert F. Wagner Middle School

Public high schools

- Talent Unlimited High School
- Eleanor Roosevelt High School
- Urban Academy Laboratory High School

Other schools

- Hunter College High School

==== Private schools ====
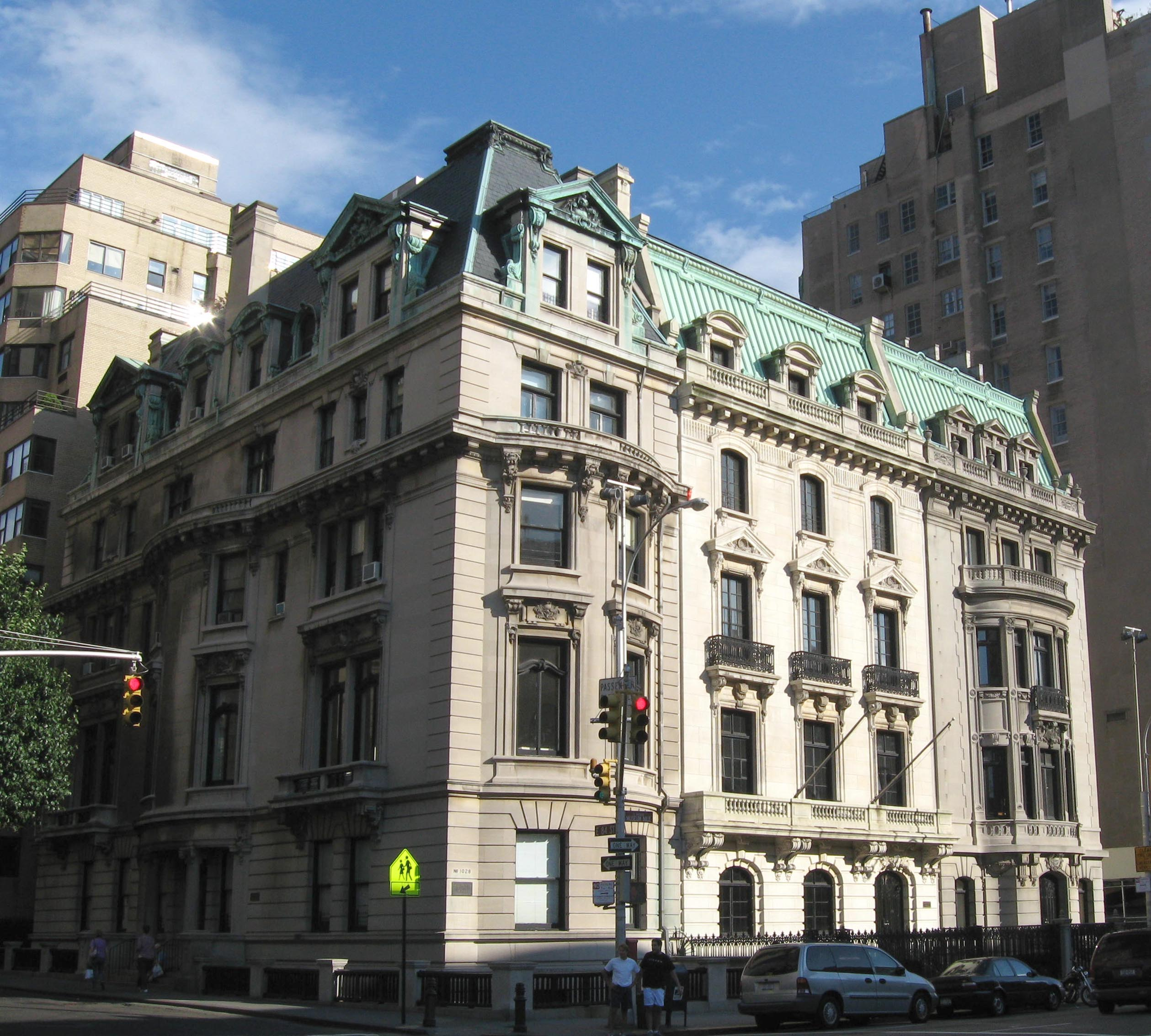
Marymount School of New York

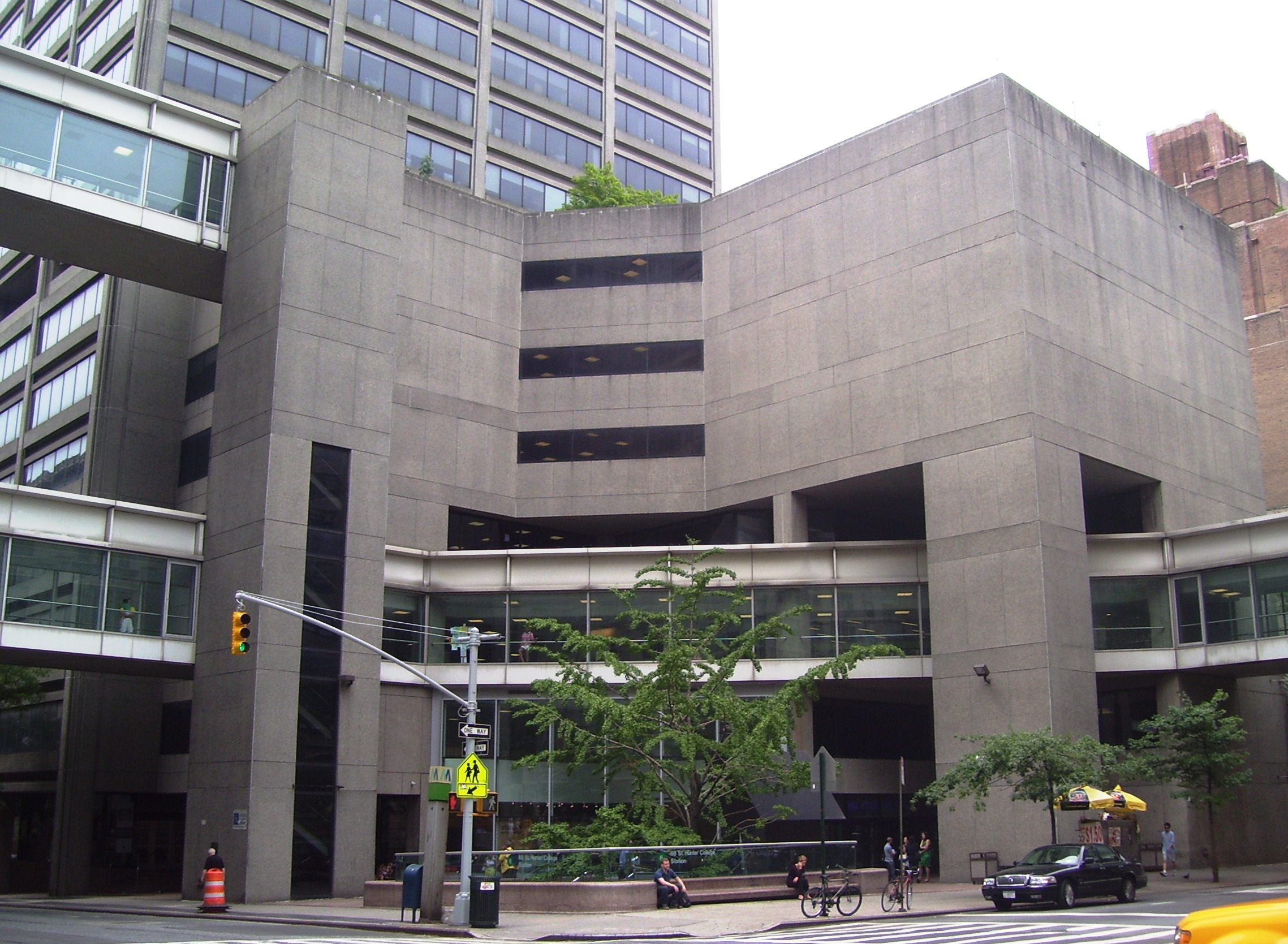
The West Building at Hunter College

Co-educational schools

- Birch Wathen Lenox School
- Caedmon School
- Dalton School
- Loyola School
- Lycée Français de New York
- La Scuola d'Italia Guglielmo Marconi
- Park East School
- Rudolf Steiner School (see Waldorf education)
- Saint Ignatius Loyola School
- The Town School
- Trevor Day School
- Ramaz School
- Sephardic Academy of Manhattan
- Islamic Cultural Center School

Girls' schools

- Brearley School
- Cathedral High School
- Chapin School
- Convent of the Sacred Heart
- Dominican Academy
- Hewitt School
- Manhattan High School for Girls
- Marymount School
- St. Vincent Ferrer High School
- Nightingale-Bamford School
- Spence School
- St. Jean Baptiste High School

Boys' schools

- Allen-Stevenson School
- The Browning School
- The Buckley School
- Regis High School
- St. Bernard's School
- St. David's School

=== Colleges and universities ===
- Hunter College
- Marymount Manhattan College
- Icahn School of Medicine at Mount Sinai
- New York Medical College
- New York School of Interior Design
- New York University Institute for the Study of the Ancient World
- New York University Institute of Fine Arts
- Rockefeller University
- Weill Cornell Medical College
- Zucker School of Medicine

=== Libraries ===
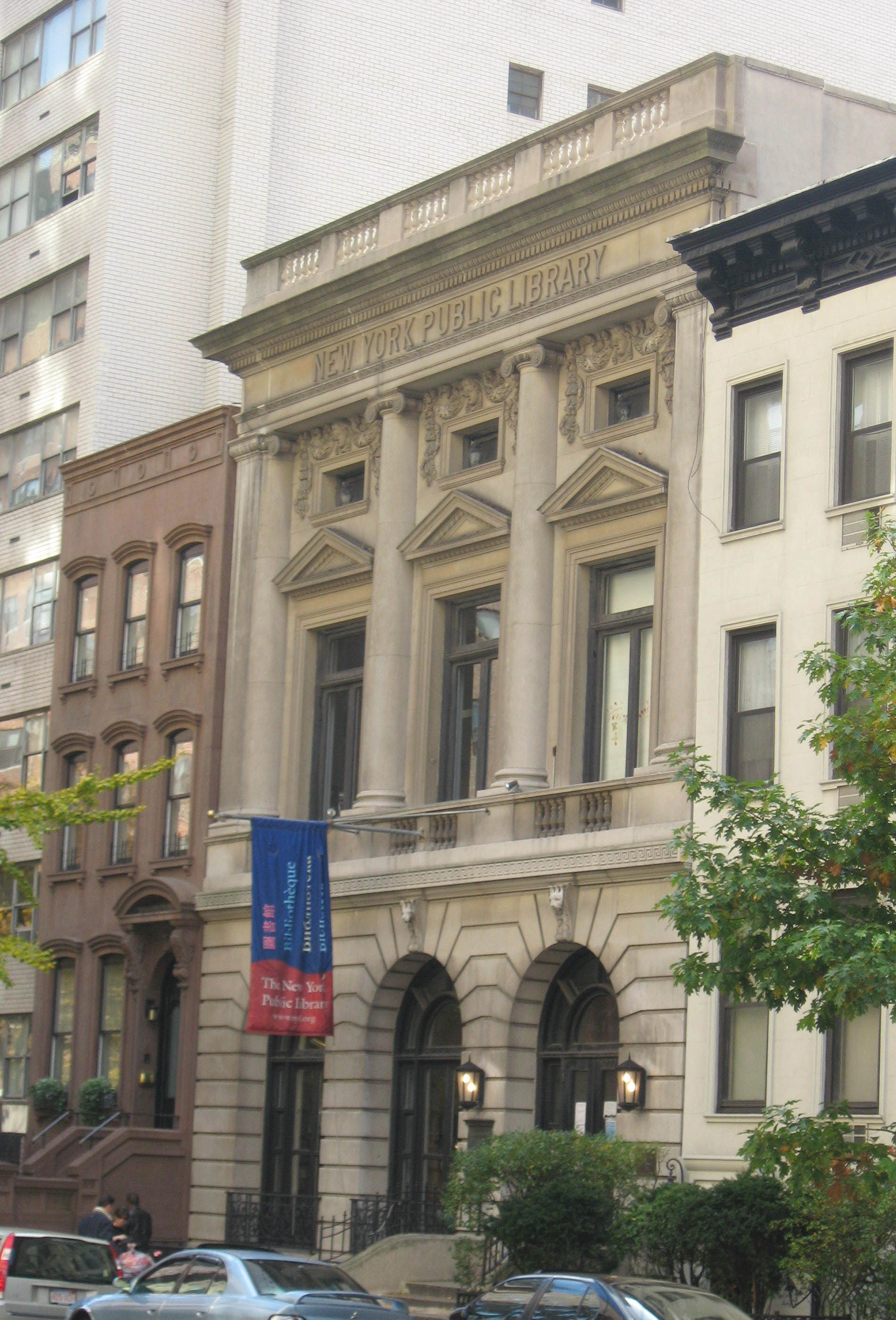
New York Public Library's Yorkville branch

The New York Public Library (NYPL) operates four branches on the Upper East Side.

- The 67th Street branch is located at 328 East 67th Street. The branch, a Carnegie library, opened in 1905 and was restored in the 1950s and in 2000. The two-story, 14,000-square-foot (1,300 m^{2}) structure resembles the Yorkville branch library in design.
- The Yorkville branch is located at 222 East 79th Street. The branch, a Carnegie library, opened in 1902 and was renovated in 1986–1987. The three-story space is listed on the New York State Register of Historic Places and the National Register of Historic Places.
- The Webster branch is located at 1465 York Avenue. The branch was founded in 1893 as the Webster Free Library, and the current Carnegie library structure opened in 1906.
- The 96th Street branch is located at 112 East 96th Street. The branch, a Carnegie library, opened in 1905 and was restored in 1991.

== Transportation ==
The Upper East Side is served by two subway lines, the four-track IRT Lexington Avenue Line (4, 5, 6, and <6> trains) under Lexington Avenue and the two-track Second Avenue Subway (N, Q, and R trains) under Second Avenue.

The Second Avenue Line serves to relieve congestion on the Lexington Avenue Line. The first phase of the line opened on January 1, 2017, consisting of three stations on the Upper East Side: 96th Street, 86th Street, and 72nd Street. The planned Second Avenue Line includes three additional phases to be built at a later date, which will extend the line north to 125th Street/Park Avenue in Harlem and south to Hanover Square in the Financial District.

There are also local and limited MTA Regional Bus Operations routes M1, M2, M3, M4, M15, M15 SBS, M31, M98, M101, M102 and M103 going uptown and downtown, as well as the crosstown M66, M72, M79 SBS, M86 SBS and M96.

The Upper East Side is served by NYC Ferry at the East 90th Street landing; the Soundview Ferry has operated at the stop since August 2018 and the Astoria Ferry began serving the landing in August 2000.

== Media ==
=== News ===
The Upper East Side is served by several news organizations that focus on the neighborhood.

- Our Town
- Upper East Site
- Patch UES

=== In popular culture ===
The Upper East Side has been a setting for many films, television shows, and other media.

=== Films ===
- The Lost Weekend (1945)
- Breakfast at Tiffany's (1961)
- Sunday in New York (1963)
- The Boys in the Band (1970)
- Live and Let Die (1973)
- The Great Gatsby (1974)
- The Prisoner of Second Avenue (1975)
- Kramer vs. Kramer (1979)
- Manhattan (1979)
- The Muppets Take Manhattan (1984)
- Ghostbusters II (1989)
- Family Business (1989)
- The Bonfire of the Vanities (1990)
- Metropolitan (1990)
- Juice (1992)
- Six Degrees of Separation (1993)
- Manhattan Murder Mystery (1993)
- Harriet the Spy (1996)
- Ransom (1996)
- One Fine Day (1996)
- The Devil's Advocate (1997)
- A Perfect Murder (1998)
- Cruel Intentions (1999)
- The Thomas Crown Affair (1999)
- Eyes Wide Shut (1999)
- Autumn in New York (2000)
- American Psycho (2000)
- Cruel Intentions 2 (2001)
- Tart (2001)
- 25th Hour (2002)
- Uptown Girls (2003)
- Igby Goes Down (2002)
- Two Weeks Notice (2002)
- Eloise at the Plaza (2003)
- The Nanny Diaries (2007)
- The Devil Wears Prada (2006)
- Sex and the City (2008)
- Ghost Town (2008)
- Made of Honor (2008)
- The Wackness (2008)
- The Women (2008)
- Bride Wars (2009)
- Confessions of a Shopaholic (2009)
- The International (2009)
- The Back-up Plan (2010)
- Sex and the City 2 (2010)
- Twelve (2010)
- Remember Me (2010)
- Arbitrage (2012)
- Blue Jasmine (2013)
- The Goldfinch (2019)
- The Scary of Sixty-First (2021)

=== Television shows ===
- I Love Lucy (1951–1957)
- Family Affair (TV series) (1966–1971)
- That Girl (TV series) (1966–1971)
- The Odd Couple (1970–1975)
- The Jeffersons (1975–1985)
- Diff'rent Strokes (1978–1986)
- The Nanny (1993–1999)
- High Society (1995–1996)
- Will & Grace (1998–2006)
- Sex and the City (1998–2004)
- Ugly Betty (2006–2010)
- Dirty Sexy Money (2007–2008)
- The City (2008–2010)
- Yes! PreCure 5 (2007–2008)
- The Real Housewives of New York City (2008–present)
- Gossip Girl (2007–2012)
- Lipstick Jungle (2008–2009)
- NYC Prep (2009–2010)
- White Collar (2009–2014)
- Ringer (2011–2012)
- Kourtney and Kim Take New York (2011–2012)
- Gallery Girls (2012)
- Odd Mom Out (2015–2017), based on Jill Kargman's novel Momzillas
- Billions (2016–present)
- Succession (2018–2023)
- The Undoing (2020)
- And Just Like That (2021–present)
- Gossip Girl (2021–2022)

=== Books ===
- American Psycho by Bret Easton Ellis
- Blue Bloods series by Melissa de la Cruz
- Breakfast at Tiffany's by Truman Capote
- Death Wish by Brian Garfield
- Franny and Zooey by J. D. Salinger
- Gossip Girl series by Cecily von Ziegesar
- Harriet the Spy by Louise Fitzhugh
- Heartburn by Nora Ephron
- Lipstick Jungle by Candace Bushnell
- Momzillas by Jill Kargman
- My Year of Rest and Relaxation by Ottessa Moshfegh
- Primates of Park Avenue by Wednesday Martin
- Sex and the City by Candace Bushnell
- Shopaholic Takes Manhattan by Sophie Kinsella
- The 25th Hour by David Benioff
- The A-List series by Zoey Dean
- The Bonfire of the Vanities by Tom Wolfe
- The Catcher in the Rye by J. D. Salinger
- The Devil Wears Prada by Lauren Weisberger
- The Ex-Mrs. Hedgefund by Jill Kargman
- The Luxe by Anna Godbersen
- The Manny by Holly Peterson
- The Nanny Diaries by Nicola Kraus and Emma McLaughlin
- The Princess Diaries by Meg Cabot
- Twelve by Nick McDonell
- Raise High the Roof Beam, Carpenters by J. D. Salinger
- Wolves In Chic Clothing by Jill Kargman

=== Fictional places and characters ===
- The X-Men's fictional Hellfire Club mansion is said to be four blocks away from the Avengers Mansion, another fictional building at 70th Street and Fifth Avenue
- Mad Men's Don Draper owned an apartment in a fictional building at 73rd Street and Park Avenue
- Constance Billard School for Girls and St. Jude's School for Boys in Gossip Girl
- The Duchesne School in the vampire novels Blue Bloods by Melissa de la Cruz
- Percy Jackson, title character of Rick Riordan's Percy Jackson & the Olympians pentalogy
- Sherman McCoy – The Bonfire of the Vanities
- Samantha Delmonico and John Surling in Friends from College
- Jacqueline White (Unbreakable Kimmy Schmidt)

== Notable people ==
The neighborhood has a long tradition of being home to some of the world's wealthy, powerful, and influential families and individuals.

== Notable residential buildings ==
- 834 Fifth Avenue
- 927 Fifth Avenue
- 930 Fifth Avenue
- 960 Fifth Avenue
- 1040 Fifth Avenue
- 502 Park Avenue
- 520 Park Avenue
- 550 Park Avenue
- 740 Park Avenue
- 778 Park Avenue
- 1342 Lexington Avenue
- 57 East 66th Street
- 225 East 86th Street
- 343 East 74th Street
- 20 East End Avenue
- Casa 74
- Raymond C. and Mildred Kramer House

== See also ==
- East Side (Manhattan)
- Upper West Side
- Upper Manhattan
- Yorkville, Manhattan
- Carnegie Hill
- Lenox Hill
