= Levi Marhabi =

Yemenite Orthodox Jew

- ليفي مرحابي
- Born: Levi Salem Musa Marhabi c. 1987 (age approx. 39); Kitaf wa Al Boqe'e District, North Yemen
- Other names: Libi Marhabi, Libby Salem Marhaby

Levi Salem Musa Marhabi (Arabic: ليفي سالم موسى مرحبي, born c. 1987) is a Yemenite Orthodox Jew and reportedly the last Jew living in Yemen. He was imprisoned by Houthi militants in 2016 for allegedly assisting in smuggling a Torah scroll out of the country. Held in a prison in Sanaa, Marhabi has received harsh treatment from his detainers, with an emergence of reports of torture and deteriorating health conditions. In 2019, a Yemeni court ordered his release; however, the Houthis continued to detain him. As of September 2024, per the United States Commission on International Religious Freedom, he is in solitary confinement and in poor health.

== Arrest ==
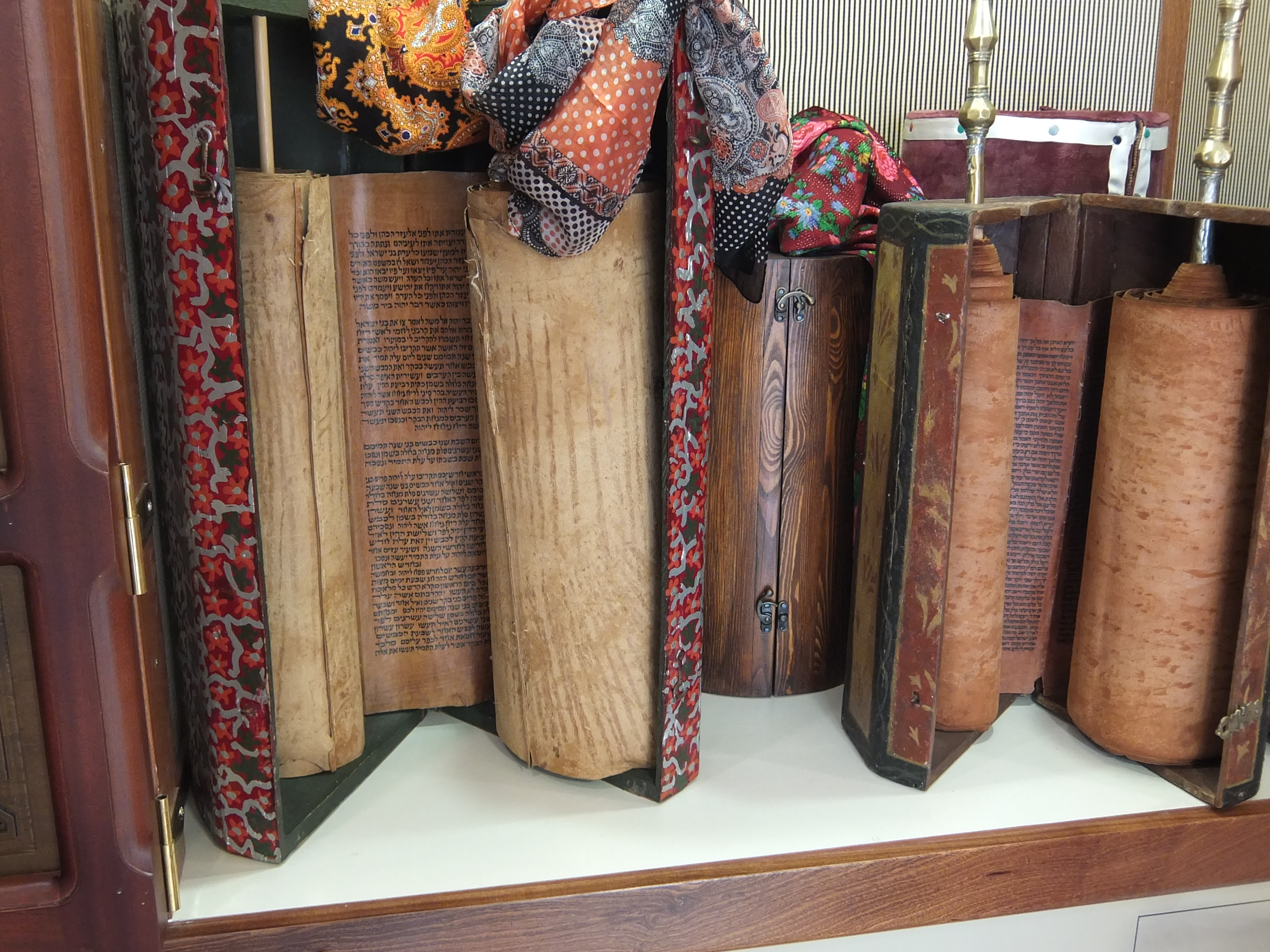
Two Yemenite Torah scrolls

In March 2016, 17 Yemeni Jews from Raydah were flown from Yemen to Israel on a trip that had been planned for over two years. The operation involved the Jewish Agency for Israel and the United States Department of State. Among those who aided in the operation was Israeli-American businessman Mordechai Kahana. With them, the emigrants took a deerskin Torah scroll which is allegedly over 800 years old. The scroll was seen as a national treasure by both the Houthis and Yemeni authorities. Upon arrival, both the emigrants and the scroll were welcomed by Prime Minister of Israel Benjamin Netanyahu. Photos of the scroll in Israel were seen by the Houthis, who said that it was illegally removed.

Marhabi, who had lived in Israel, was accused of assisting the emigrants. In the same month, he returned to Yemen due to difficulties assimilating in Israel, where he was immediately arrested by Houthi intelligence services. Additionally, three Muslim men were arrested alongside him, including an airport employee who was accused of permitting the emigrants to board an airplane with the scroll.

== Imprisonment ==
Since his arrest, the Houthis have held Marhabi in a prison in Sanaa, the capital of Yemen. Throughout his imprisonment, he has faced inhumane conditions, deteriorating health conditions, and torture. Marhabi suffers from kidney and lung-related health problems, and has lost all of his teeth, allegedly from repeated torture. Reports also suggest that he had become partially paralyzed from a stroke.

On 18 March 2018, the Houthis sentenced Marhabi to three years and six months in prison. The following year in September, a Houthi-controlled appeals court ordered Marhabi's release, ruling that he was innocent and being wrongfully detained. The Houthis released the three men who were arrested along with Marhabi, but despite the court ruling, did not release him.

=== Houthi ultimatum ===
In March 2021, thirteen Jews from three different families, including Marhabi's mother, made a departure from Sanaa to Cairo, Egypt. They initially refused to leave, but agreed when the Houthis demanded departure in exchange for Marhabi's release. One of the Jews stated: "They gave us a choice between staying in the midst of harassment and keeping Salem a prisoner or leaving and having him released." Despite the deal, the Houthis continued to hold Marhabi. The Jews who departed were some of the last of their community living in Yemen. After they left, only four elderly Jews remained in the country. In 2022, a United Nations report said that only one Jew remained in Yemen. Jason Guberman, executive director of the American Sephardi Federation, said that Marhabi was "undoubtedly" that Jew.

== Calls for release ==
Secretary Pompeo
(@SecPompeo)
tweeted:

Houthi rebels in Yemen continue to persecute religious minorities. Levi Salem Musa Marhabi, a member of Yemen’s Jewish community, has endured four years of wrongful detention. We call for his immediate release.

10 November 2020

U.S. Special Envoy to Monitor and Combat Antisemitism Elan Carr called for the immediate release of Marhabi on Twitter in August 2020, saying that he had endured four years in prison despite legal orders to release him. In November of the same year, U.S. Secretary of State Mike Pompeo called for Marhabi's immediate and unconditional release, saying that he had been wrongfully detained and that he stood with Yemen's Jewish population in calling for his release. In 2021, U.S. Department of State spokesperson Ned Price on behalf of the Biden Administration called for Marhabi's release. In the same year, during a United Nations Security Council briefing about Yemen, U.S. Representative to the United Nations Linda Thomas-Greenfield described Marhabi's detention as wrongful and a violation of basic human rights over his religious beliefs. She called on the Houthis to immediately release him and cease their human rights abuses.

The American Sephardi Federation (ASF), in collaboration with the Conference of Presidents of Major American Jewish Organizations, launched a campaign to raise public awareness about Marhabi's conditions, however it was met with little traction. Jason Guberman said that Marhabi's release should be demanded by not only the U.S. government but Jewish organizations across the world, and called it unfortunate how his case did not receive much attention from the Jewish community.

Senior rabbi in the United Arab Emirates Elie Abadie also called for Marhabi's immediate release. He mentioned how three other Muslim men were arrested with him, yet he was the only one who remained imprisoned, which Abadie said was because of his religion. He called the Houthis' treatment of Marhabi and the rest of the Yemeni Jews "crimes against humanity" and called on them to respect religious freedom.

== See also ==
- Operation Magic Carpet (Yemen)
- Zablon Simintov
