= Urban Academy Laboratory High School =

Public school in New York City

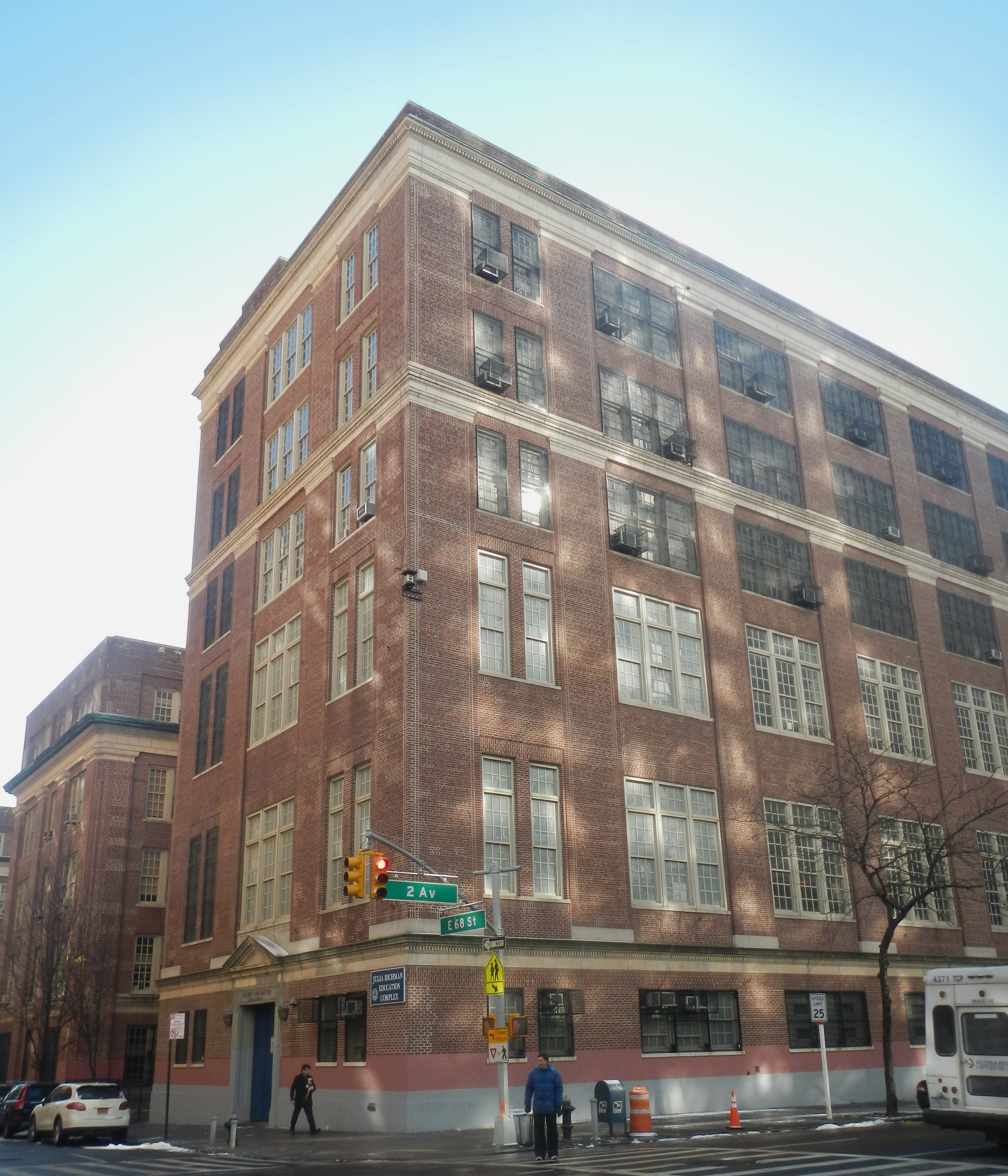
- Urban Academy building in Julia Richman Education Complex

Location
- 317 East 67th Street; New York, New York 10065; United States; 40°45′58″N 73°57′36″W

Information
- Type: Public
- Motto: A Small school with Big dreams
- Established: 1986
- School district: New York City Department of Education
- Principal: Christine Olson & Terri Grosso
- Teaching staff: 15 (as of 2013-14)
- Grades: 9–12
- Enrollment: 146
- Website: www.urbanacademy.org

The Urban Academy Laboratory High School (also known as the Urban Academy) is a small, progressive, transfer public high school located on the Upper East Side of New York City. Founded in 1986, its goal was to create a place where students could learn in a nontraditional sense. In 1995, it became one of six small schools located in the Julia Richman Education Complex.

The structure of the classes is non-traditional. Teachers don't lecture; rather, they facilitate class discussions. They create their own curriculum and direct students with a focus on inquiry, critical thinking, and problem-solving. Students' primary source of information is not textbooks. Almost all classes are discussion based, with students expected to make arguments and support them with evidence, drawn either from course materials (primary and secondary texts) and/or their own experience. Urban's academic program is rigorous and college-oriented. It has been designated a U.S. Department of Education "Blue Ribbon School of Excellence" and a "New American High School National Showcase Site."

As a member school of the New York Performance Standards Consortium, Urban Academy has a waiver from the New York State testing curriculum. Students must pass only the English Language Arts Regents exam, and complete five other performance-based assessments. Students must obtain 44 credits, as in every other public school in New York. Urban Academy does not offer credit recovery, and all students are required to spend a minimum of four semesters at Urban, regardless of the number of credits they enter with (most students spend more than four semesters).

The school's six sports teams (Soccer, Volleyball, Basketball; boys and girls teams for each) are composed of students from Urban Academy and the other three high schools housed in the building: Vanguard High School, Talent Unlimited High School, and Manhattan International High School.

Urban Academy has a selective admissions process, as one cannot simply enroll through the central New York City Department of Education office.
