= Sephardic Academy of Manhattan =

School in New York City

Location
- Upper East Side of Manhattan, New York City; United States
- 40.76537°N 73.96059°W

Information
- Type: preschool and elementary school
- Religious affiliation: Jewish
- Established: 2010
- Founders: Rabbi Elie Abadie, M.D. and Daniel J. Harari

The Sephardic Academy of Manhattan (SAM) is a Jewish preschool and elementary school on the Upper East Side of Manhattan, New York City, whose plan is to provide pre-K through middle school services.

The SAM School’s mission is to provide students with a universal education that emphasizes Sephardic-Judaic Culture and Torah knowledge and observance combined with the study of Sciences, Humanities and the Arts. This unique approach includes the pursuit of rigorous scholastic achievement, embraces a humane approach to learning, cultural recognition and religious humanism. It is rooted in a strong sense of Jewish identity as practiced in Classical Sephardic Heritage.

Rabbi Elie Abadie, M.D., started the academy in 2010. The current executive director is Michelle Dayan.

The academy is buying the six-story, 11,850-square-foot (1,101 m^{2}) building at 150 East 74th Street, located between Third Avenue and Lexington Avenue in Manhattan and previously the home of the New York Veterinary Hospital, for $14 million. SAM bought the property to expand its programming. The school was to open the new location September 2022 and could choose to convert it into a school or for a nonprofit use, with the option of adding 23,000 square feet (2,100 m^{2}). In November 2024, the Sephardic Academy of Manhattan opened a new campus at 7 East 96th Street. By the 2025–2026 academic year, there were 240 students.
