= Upper East Side Historic District =

Historic district in Manhattan, New York

- U.S. National Register of Historic Places
- U.S. Historic district
- New York State Register of Historic Places
- New York City Landmark
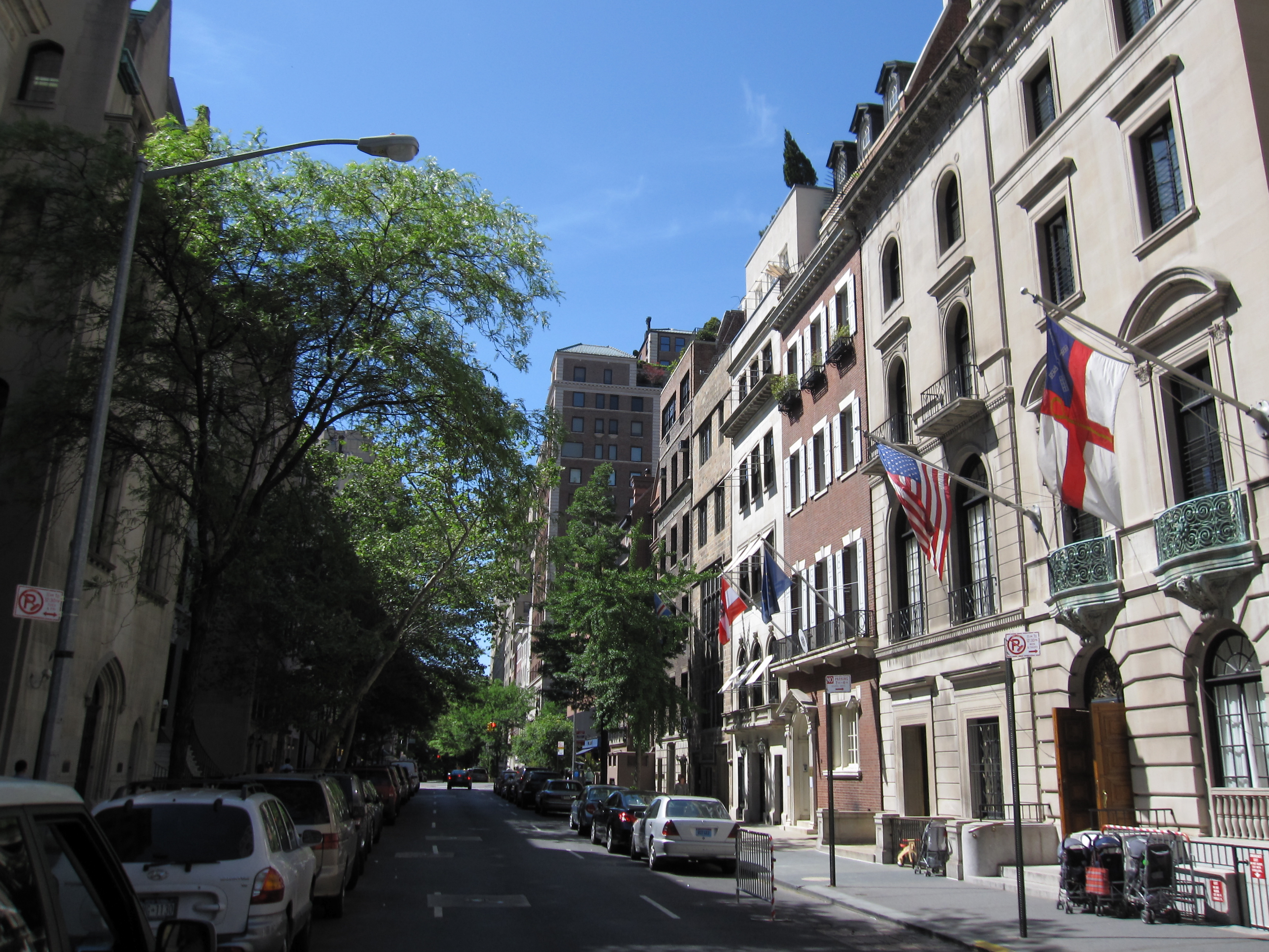
- East 69th Street with its townhouses is a typical example of the sidestreets of the Upper East Side

- Location within Manhattan Location within New York City Location within New York Location within the United States
- Location: Roughly bounded by 3rd and 5th Aves., 59th and 79th Sts., (original); Portion of 17 blocks adjacent to and E of the original district bet. E. 60th and E 75th Sts., (increase); New York, New York
- Coordinates: 40°46′11″N 73°57′59″W
- Built: 1862
- Architect: Multiple
- Architectural style: Late 19th And 20th Century Revivals, Late Victorian
- NRHP reference No.: 84002803 (original); 06000822 (increase)
- NYCL No.: 1051, 2373

Significant dates
- Added to NRHP: September 7, 1984
- Boundary increase: September 12, 2006
- Designated NYSRHP: August 2, 1984 (original); July 18, 2006 (extension)
- Designated NYCL: May 19, 1981 (original); March 23, 2010 (extension)

The Upper East Side Historic District is a historic district on the Upper East Side of Manhattan in New York City. First designated by the New York City Landmarks Preservation Commission in 1981, it was listed on the National Register of Historic Places in 1984. Its boundaries were expanded in 2010.

The district includes all of the Fifth Avenue properties bordering Central Park from 59th to 78th Street; both sides of Madison Avenue from 61st Street to 77th Street; both sides of Park Avenue from just below 62nd Street to 72nd Street; and portions of both sides of Lexington Avenue from 63rd Street to 75th Street.

The district is home to a number of buildings individually listed on the National Register, including the Barbara Rutherford Hatch House, Barbizon Hotel for Women, Gertrude Rhinelander Waldo Mansion, and Sara Delano Roosevelt Memorial House, as well as edifices that are more recent additions like the Edmond J. Safra Synagogue — a 2003 building designed in an "artful synthesis of the composition, details and material palette of the Beaux-Arts style," to complement the historic buildings that surround it.
