= Edmond J. Safra Synagogue (Manhattan) =

Orthodox Sephardic synagogue in New York City

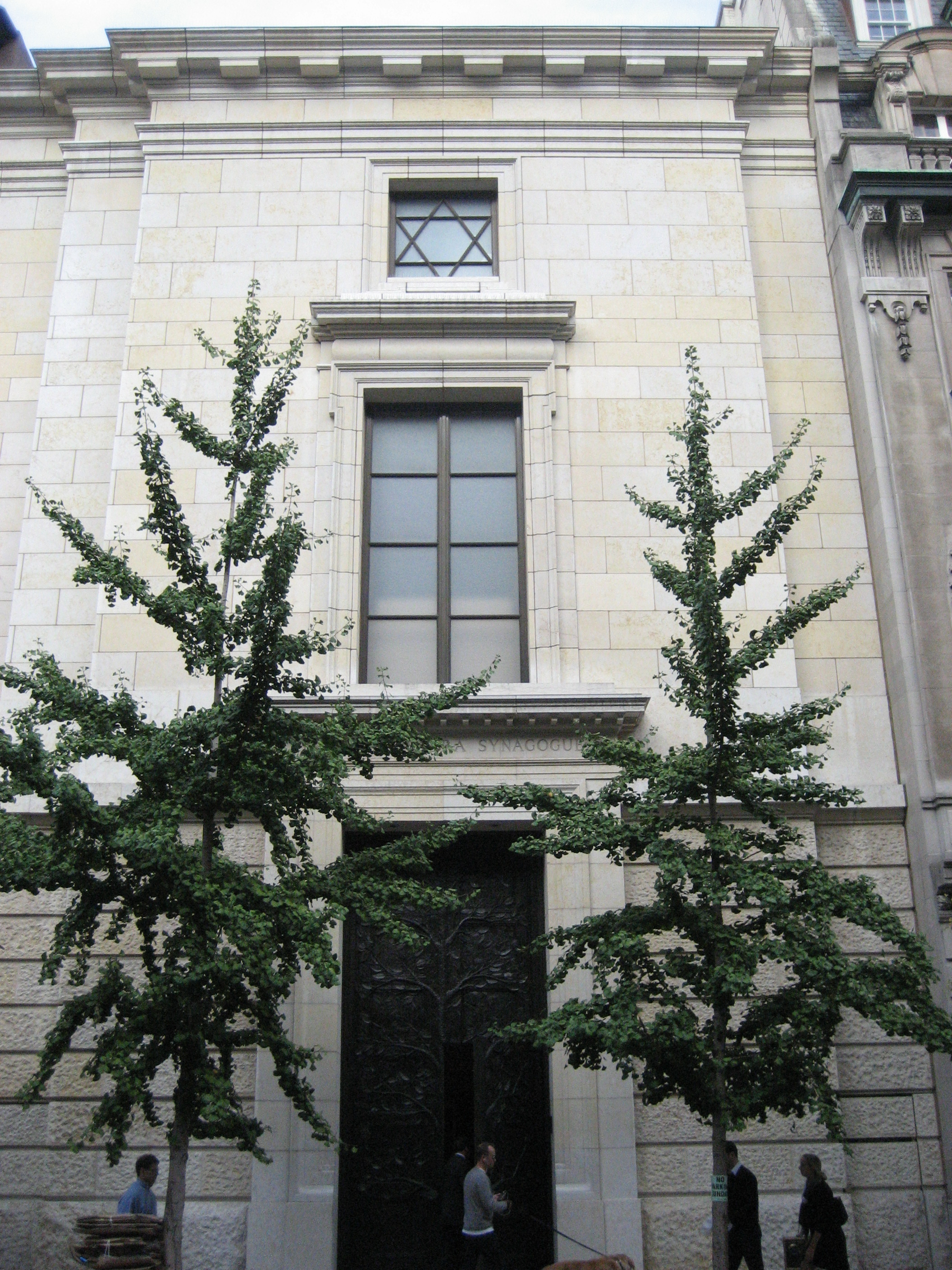
- Edmond J. Safra Synagogue in Manhattan

- Location in Manhattan

Religion
- Affiliation: Orthodox Judaism
- Rite: Sephardi
- Ecclesiastical or organisational status: Synagogue
- Leadership: Rabbi Solomon Farhi
- Status: Active

Location
- Location: 11 East 63rd Street, Upper East Side, New York City, New York
- Country: United States
- Coordinates: 40°46′00″N 73°58′13″W

Architecture
- Type: Synagogue
- Style: Beaux-Arts
- Funded by: Edmond J. Safra Philanthropic Foundation
- Established: 2003 (as a congregation)
- Completed: 2003
- Materials: Jerusalem stone

Website
- ejsny.org

The Edmond J. Safra Synagogue, organized by Congregation Beit Yaakov, is an Orthodox Jewish synagogue located on East 63rd Street off Fifth Avenue on the Upper East Side of Manhattan in New York City. The congregation practices in the Sephardi rite.

The synagogue is one of several that are eponymous with Edmond J. Safra (1932–1999), a banker and philanthropist, partially or fully funded by the Edmond J. Safra Foundation.

== Development ==
The synagogue project was initiated by philanthropist Edmond Safra before his death in 1999, and dedicated in 2003. Safra's goal was to have a Sephardic synagogue on Manhattan's Upper East Side.

During his lifetime, Edmond J. Safra was often in New York City and spent many Shabbats in Manhattan. Noting the absence of a formal synagogue and communal center for the Sephardic Jews of the Upper East Side of Manhattan, he expressed a desire to build a central house of worship in the area. The synagogue was completed in December 2002.

Dignitaries including the Chief Rabbi of Israel and the then Mayor Michael Bloomberg attended an official inauguration of the building in October 2003.

== Architecture ==
The synagogue, whose congregational name is "Congregation Beit Yaakov" after Safra's father's name, was designed by architect Thierry Despont, and has been described as a "sumptuous work of Beaux-Arts revival." The interior and facade of the building is made of Jerusalem stone quarried in Judea. The massive bronze doors with their Tree of Life motif are by American sculptor Mark Beard.

Due to its location in the Upper East Side Historic District, the synagogue design required approval from the New York City Landmarks Preservation Commission, which called it an "artful synthesis of the composition, details and material palette of the Beaux-Arts style, which plays an important role in defining the special architectural character of the Upper East Side Historic District."

== Clergy ==
On January 31, 2017, Rabbi Elie Abadie, the first rabbi of the Edmond J. Safra Synagogue, was fired from his position after failing to reach a financial agreement after his contract expired and that negotiations with him started in 2015 had been unsuccessful.

Following the rabbi's departure in January 2017, the synagogue's name was changed to Congregation Beit Edmond and Rabbi Shlomo Farhi became the rabbi.
