= Elie Abadie =

Senior Rabbi of the United Arab Emirates

Rabbi Elie Abadie
- Born: 1960 (age 65–66); Beirut, Lebanon
- Occupations: Rabbi (full-time); Gastroenterology (part-time)
- Spouse: Elise Eichler

Elie Abadie (Arabic: إيلي عبادي) is a Senior Rabbi in the Association of Gulf Jewish Communities and Senior Rabbi in Residence of the Jewish Community Center of UAE (JCE). He is the former Director of the Jacob E. Safra Institute of Sephardic Studies at Yeshiva University, with an area of interest on the topics of Sephardic Judaism, history, philosophy, and comparative traditional law. He is a member of the board of the American Sephardi Federation and the World Sephardic Educational Center, and co-president of Justice for Jews from Arab Countries. He is a former member of the Board and an Officer of the Rabbinical Council of America (RCA), the Treasurer/Vice-president of the New York Board of Rabbis, and co-chair of the Sadat Congressional Gold Medal Committee.

== Early life and education ==
=== Family Origins ===
Abadie's parents were forced to flee Aleppo, Syria, where his family had lived for millennia, under government pressure. Abadie explained his parents' flight from Syria:

“My parents lived right next to the synagogue. They saw people enter the synagogue, pillage it, torched it, took out the Torah scrolls and holy books and burnt them. My parents escaped from their home through the backdoor as people tried to get into my parents’ house. They left and never returned.”

Abadie was born in Beirut, Lebanon in 1960. The Abadie family moved to Mexico City in 1971 after the Palestinian Liberation Organization relocated its headquarters from Jordan to Lebanon. They lived in Lebanon with no citizenship, as registered refugees, with identity documents reading "stateless." Abadie's father, had his picture posted on walls around Beirut claiming he was a Zionist leader, prompting his family's emigration.

After moving to the United States in 1979 to attend Yeshiva University, he earned his B.A. in Outline of health sciences in 1983, B.S.C. in 1984 in Bible Studies, Hebrew Teacher's diploma in 1985, and a master's degree in Jewish Philosophy in 1986 from Bernard Revel Graduate School of Yeshiva University. Abadie received his ordination in 1986 from Rabbi Isaac Elchanan Theological Seminary. He attended SUNY Downstate Health Sciences University, where he graduated in 1990 with an M.D. degree. He did his residency in Internal Medicine, and later his fellowship in gastroenterology at Maimonides Medical Center where he finished in 1995.

== Tenure as rabbi ==
Abadie became a rabbi at Edmond J. Safra Synagogue (Manhattan) in 2001.

He was the founding rabbi of Shaare Mizrah-Manhattan East Synagogue, the Head of School of the Sephardic Academy of Manhattan, and the Spiritual Leader of the Moise Safra Community Center in Manhattan. From 2003 to 2017 he was the founding Rabbi and Spiritual Leader of the Edmond J. Safra Synagogue in New York City (now Congregation Beit Edmond), one of the largest Sephardic synagogues in New York City.

He is currently the President of JJAC (Justice for Jews from Arab Countries) and a member of the governing council of the World Zionist Organization (WZO). He is the founder of the Sephardic Academy of Manhattan and served as the Director of the Jacob E. Safra Institute of Sephardic Studies, at Yeshiva University and college professor of Sephardic Judaism, history, philosophy, and comparative traditional law.

=== Senior Rabbi in the United Arab Emirates ===
In November 2020, after the signing of the Abraham Accords, which normalized relations between the UAE and Israel, Abadie moved to Dubai to become the country's Senior Rabbi.

In 2021, Abadie issued an official condemnation of the Houthis for imprisoning a Yemenite Jew, Levi Salem Marhabi, for helping smuggle a group of Jews into Israel; dubbing it as a crime against humanity.

== Personal life ==
Abadie's native language is Arabic and is fluent in six languages. He is also a part-time gastroenterologist. Abadie has received the Orden Del Merito Civil, the highest civil decoration in Spain. He has been married to Elise Eichler for over 36 years.

== See also ==
- History of the Jews in the United Arab Emirates
- Yehuda Sarna
- Levi Duchman
