= Talent Unlimited High School =

Public school in New York City

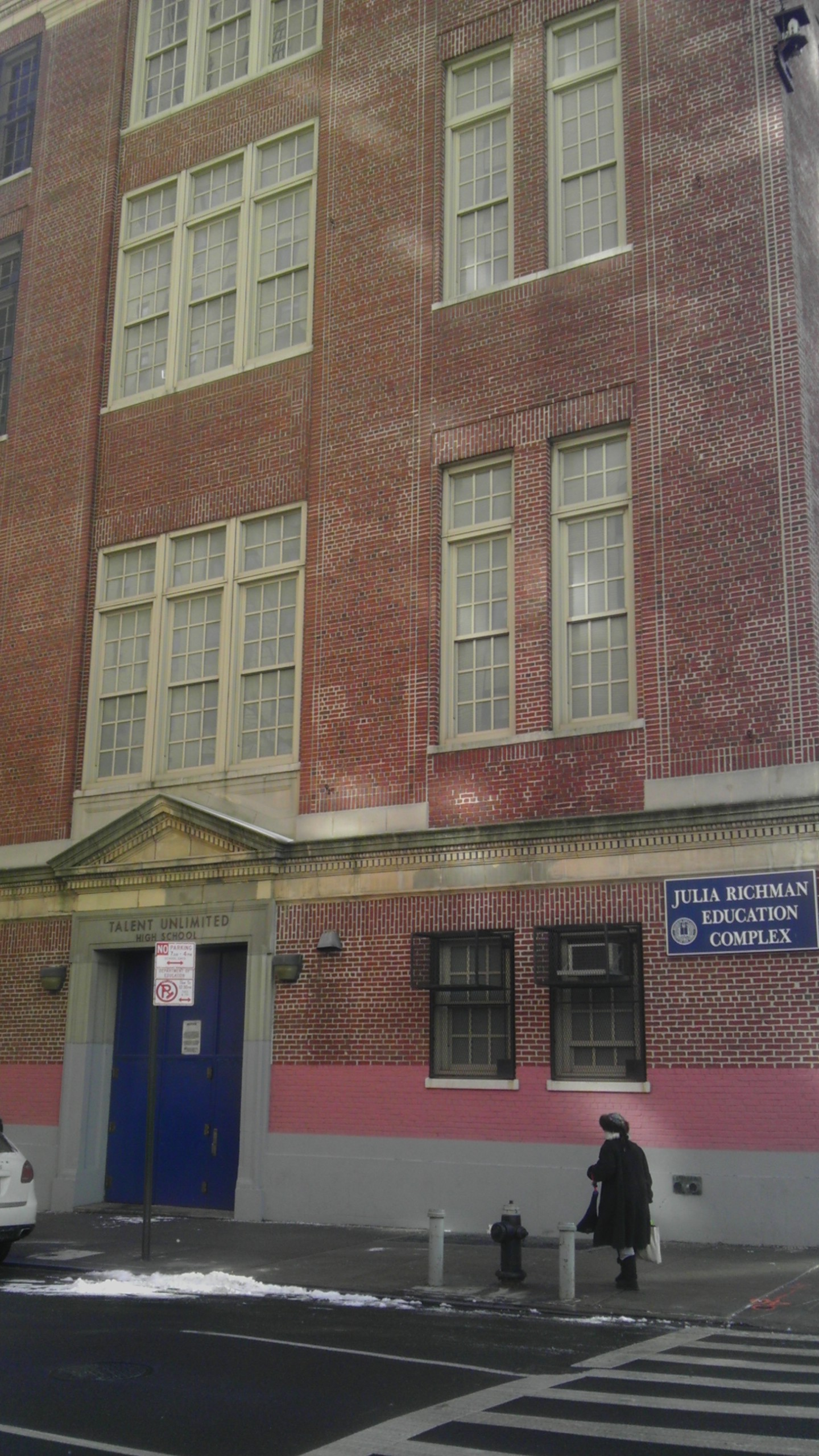
- School entrance within Julia Richman Education Complex

Location
- 300 East 68th Street; New York, New York 10065; United States; 40°45′58″N 73°57′36″W

Information
- School type: Public
- Established: 1995
- School district: 2New York City Department of Education
- CEEB code: 334073
- Principal: William Gagsteter
- Grades: 9–12
- Enrollment: 505 (as of 2016-17)
- Colours: Maroon and Grey
- Website: tuhs.nyc

Talent Unlimited High School is a public high school of the performing arts located on the Upper East Side of Manhattan in New York City.

== History ==
The school started as a pilot program in January 1973. Students took academic courses at their home high schools and attended Talent Unlimited in the afternoons. The director of the program was John Motley, conductor of the All City High School Chorus. The music teaching staff included Arlene Lieberman, Robert Vitale, H. L. Smith, II, Camilla Williams and Fred Norman. This first class performed at Gracie Mansion for Mayor John V. Lindsay and Marian Anderson.

== Programs ==
Talent Unlimited High School educates in five performing arts fields: Vocal Music, Musical Theatre, Acting, Dance, and Instrumental Music. These programs are taught by well experienced teachers and guest artists, that have worked in their fields for over 10 years.

== Campus ==
It is within the Julia Richman Education Complex along with five other schools: Urban Academy, Vanguard High School, P226M Junior High Annex, Ella Baker Elementary School, and Manhattan International High School.

== Extracurricular activities ==
The Talent Unlimited Choir has appeared on the WCBS show "Holiday in Bryant Park" in 2007 and 2008. They backed up Broadway singers Norm Lewis and Carolee Carmello in 2007, and Broadway actor Cheyenne Jackson and cabaret singer Michael Feinstein in 2008. They also performed in December 2009 on the NCM/Fathom special "The Christmas Sweater - The Road to Redemption," which aired live from Skirball Center for the Performing Arts in New York City and was hosted by Glenn Beck.

== Notable alumni ==
- Stephanie Andujar,

actress/singer/dancer

- Amber Mark,

singer/songwriter

- Julissa Bermudez
- Angela Bofill, singer/songwriter
- Deemi, singer/songwriter
- Mos Def, actor/comedian
- Laurence Fishburne, actor/producer
- Corey Glover, singer/actor
- Kadeem Hardison, actor/director
- Edward W. Hardy, composer/violinist
- Solomon Hicks, guitar player, blues singer
- Lisa Lisa (born Lisa Velez), singer/musician
- Anthony Ortiz, singer/founder TKA
- Gene Anthony Ray, actor/dancer
- Keith Rogers, Photographer/Musician/Computer Programmer
- Derrick Simmons, director/stunt actor
- Brenda K. Starr, singer/songwriter
- Julius P Williams, composer, conductor, first African American president of the Conductors Guild
- Todd Williams, actor
- Malik Yoba, actor/singer
