= Derrick Simmons (director) =

American actor and director

- Born: Queens, New York
- Occupations: Actor, director, producer, screenwriter, stunt artist, filmmaker, record producer, songwriter, entrepreneur
- Years active: 1984–present
- Website: https://www.DerrickSimmons.com

Derrick Simmons is an American actor, film director, producer, stunt artist, music producer and entrepreneur.

== Early life ==
Derrick Simmons was born in Queens, New York. He attended Harbor JHS of Performing Arts in Harlem, New York and later attended Talent Unlimited High School where he majored in drama.

== Career ==
Derrick Simmons started his acting career at age 10 by appearing in a National Burger King commercial where he appeared opposite Stacey Dash.

As a stuntman has performed in more than 175 films. He wrote, produced and directed three films, and as an actor he has performed in around 40 titles.

=== Main works ===
Simmons has worked as actor and stuntman in various television programs such as Law & Order, New York Undercover, The Wire, Third Watch, Oz, Hack, The Sopranos, Law & Order SVU, The David Letterman Show, Saturday Night Live, 30 Rock, The Good Wife, Orange is the New Black, and House of Cards.

Some of Simmons's feature film credits include Deja Vu, American Gangster, A Bronx Tale, Tower Heist, Ray (where he stunt doubled Jamie Foxx as Ray Charles), Spike Lee's Inside Man, Precious, Find Me Guilty, The Purge: Election Year and Teenage Mutant Ninja Turtles: Out of the Shadows.

==== Film production ====
Simmons' production company, Derrick Simmons Film Works, has produced three feature film titles. Jump Offs (2007), Women Do it Better (2009) and Nobody's Perfect (2016), hosted by Cannes World Cinema Initiative.

=== Music production ===
Simmons is CEO of Phat Tune Recording.

=== Awards and recognitions ===
Simmons won the best feature film award at the Mt Vernon Film Festival and the best director award at Pocono Mountains Film Festival.

In 2016 he was nominated as a member of the stunts crew of The Blacklist in the category Outstanding Action Performance by a Stunt Ensemble in a Television Series in the Screen Actors Guild Awards.
