= Lowell Hotel =

Hotel in Manhattan, New York

Coordinates: 40.765707°N 73.969208°W

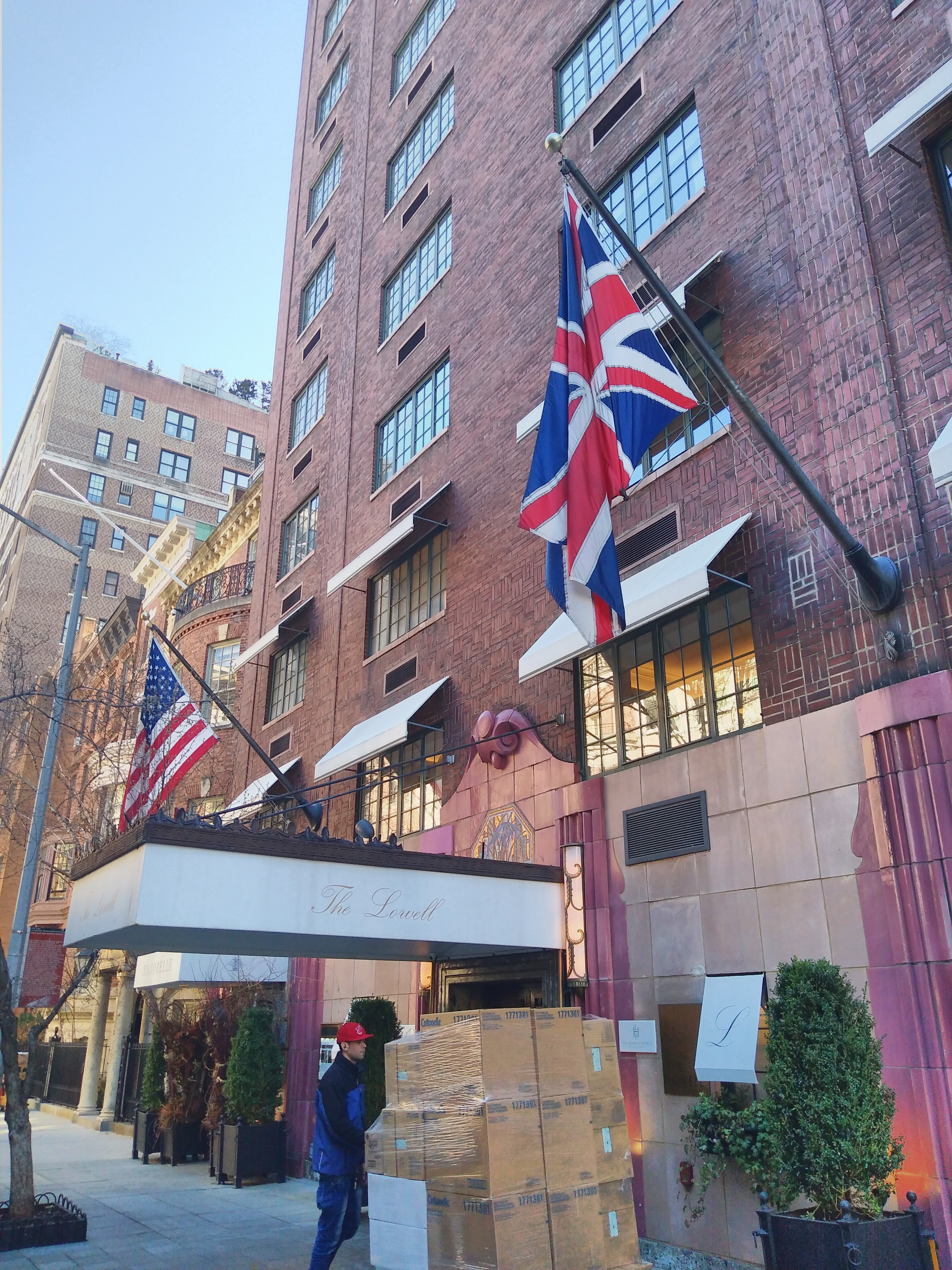
The Lowell Hotel

The Lowell Hotel is a luxury five-star hotel at 28 East 63rd Street, between Madison and Park Avenues, in New York City. The 17-story hotel was built in 1927 and is owned by Fouad Chartouni.

The Lowell is located 1,050 feet from Central Park, 150 feet from Madison Avenue, and 550 feet from Fifth Avenue. It provides on-site dining at the Pembroke Room, Majorelle, Jacques Bar, and the Club Room.

The Lowell has 74 rooms. Guests also have the option of renting out a 2,900-square-foot three-bedroom penthouse for $300,000 a month.

The Lowell underwent a $25 million three-year renovation and re-opened to the public in 2017. Los Angeles based interior designer Michael S. Smith and London Architect Mark Pinney overlooked the renovations.

The Lowell has been featured on Forbes, Observer, Town and Country (UK), and have received Best Hotel in New York awards from Travel + Leisure's World's Best Awards, Condé Nast Reader's Choice Awards, and mentioned on the U.S. News & World Report for Best Hotel.

The Lowell is a member of The Leading Hotels of the World.
