= Criticisms of Qatar's suitability to host the 2022 FIFA World Cup =

Qatar's suitability to host the 2022 FIFA World Cup faced widespread criticism. Concerns that the country was unfit to host the tournament lead to allegations of corruption and bribery in the bidding process, based on the belief that its unsuitability would have prevented it from being selected as host without corruption playing a part. There was further criticism in the run-up to, and at the World Cup, as unsuitable factors including the climate, cost, and elements of Qatari culture clashing with international tourism, came to the fore.

== Facilities and location ==
=== Stadiums ===
==== Involvement of Albert Speer ====
Albert Speer Jr., son of Hitler's chief architect and Minister of Armaments and War Production Albert Speer Sr., was given the responsibility of designing the stadiums for the 2022 Qatar World Cup. Barney Ronay, a senior sportswriter with The Guardian, expressed disbelief that the Qatar Supreme Committee thought it "the best vibe, the best shout" to involve an architect who is reminiscent of the Nazis.

However, according to Der Spiegel, "Speer's stadium designs are a significant reason why Qatar was awarded the 2022 football World Cup."

==== Environmental impact ====
Each stadium in Qatar requires 10,000 litres of water per day in winter months, when the tournament is taking place, to maintain the pitch. With little access to freshwater in the nation, the sourced water was saltwater, which has to be desalinated. The process damages the marine environment. Desalination plants in the Middle East also heavily rely on the use of fossil fuels. As well as the pitches at the stadiums, the organising committee grew and maintained a large farm of match-suitable fresh grass outside Doha, in case of turf damage. The need for so much desalination, and the oil and gas used to power the plants, have been criticised.

===== Stadium 974 =====
One of the eight stadiums, Stadium 974, was designed to be able to be disassembled so that it could be moved elsewhere, in an effort to counter the negative effect of the requirement for upkeep of unused stadiums. The large PR campaign promoting this was criticised by activists, as it overlooked the other stadiums being constructed in Qatar. After the World Cup, the stadium was never fully deconstructed and is still used as a venue as of 2025.

Both Stadium 974 and the organising committee pledge that the tournament would be carbon neutral were also criticised as attempts to greenwash Qatar, the nation with the highest per capita CO_{2} emissions, especially as carbon neutrality was planned to be achieved by planting trees to offset emissions generated by the tournament, rather than through the use of alternative energy sources. Stadium 974, located at a port, does not have air conditioning; due to the climate of Qatar, the other seven stadiums are fitted with cooling, and the systems run on fossil fuels.

=== Accommodation ===
In the days leading up to the tournament, videos emerged of the tournament accommodation, which consisted of shipping containers, some with a curtain leading to the exterior instead of four solid walls, and portable air conditioners. This accommodation cost over $200 a night. A Greek salad which costs $10, consisting of a small amount of lettuce, one slice of cucumber, and no feta, served in a foam container was criticised as expensive and unpalatable. These criticisms led to comparisons to the ill-fated Fyre Festival. Alcohol, where available, was expensive, with beer being $13.73 for 500mL.

One official fan village, comprising hundreds of shipping containers, still resembled a building site less than two days before the first World Cup match. People who had stayed in another village complained about the air conditioning and beds: "It has been hell. The air con in the cabin barely works and sounds like a [fighter jet] is taking off.... [The beds] are rock hard so you might as well sleep on the floor." Due to these issues, which Qatar officials say were caused by "owner and operator negligence", Qatar offered refunds to fans who were "severely impacted".

The Rawdat Al Jahhaniya fan village was criticised for its overpriced "night cabins" (£185 per night) made out of shipping containers. Tourists complained that the air conditioners in the cabins did not function well, facilities were falling apart, and the sleeping experience did not match their expectations. The BBC reported that the tent accommodation at the Qetaifan Island fan village got criticism for having brown-coloured tap water and no air conditioning other than a standing fan. The tent village in Al Khor was criticized for having inconvenient transportation, a lack of alcohol, long waits to check in, and no locks on the tents. The lack of suitable and affordable accommodation raised demand for daily shuttle flights from neighbouring areas, such as Dubai, that had adequate numbers of hotel rooms.

=== Use of migrant workers ===
There were criticisms of perceived human rights violations related to the organisation and hosting of this World Cup. There had long been concerns for the state of human rights in Qatar, with the state accused of sportswashing in hosting the World Cup. A large concern in Qatar's hosting of the World Cup was the conditions of migrant workers brought in to build the required infrastructure, including indentured servitude and working conditions leading to deaths.

On 23 October 2022, an article published by The Guardian included statements from migrants working on the World Cup 2022 infrastructure. In a survey of 1,000 low-wage workers, 86% of participants said that the labour changes had improved their lives. Better working conditions are now negotiable, and firms are motivated to offer them in order to attract and keep talent. Legislation has also been proposed on the minimum wage, worker safety during summer, and the election of migrant worker representatives in businesses. Labour mobility is a result of changes to the Kafala system.

The United Nations asserted in a report that "Qatar is transforming". According to Sharan Burrow, general secretary of the International Trade Union Confederation, "the new Kafala system tranche of law will put an end to Kafala and establish a contemporary industrial relations system." This was published on 17 October 2019, prior to the World Cup.

FIFA President Gianni Infantino has defended Qatar's decision to host the tournament. Others have asserted that Qatar has a better human rights record than Russia and China, which were subjected to less harsh criticism for the same problems when hosting important athletic events in the years before the 2022 FIFA World Cup.

=== Scheduling ===
The notion of staging the tournament in winter proved controversial; Blatter ruled out a January or February event because it may clash with the 2022 Winter Olympics, while others expressed concerns over a November or December event, because it might clash with the Christmas season (even though Qatar is predominantly Muslim, the players in the tournament are predominantly Christian). The Premier League voiced concern over moving the tournament to the northern hemisphere's winter as it could interfere with the local leagues. FA Chairman Greg Dyke said, shortly after he took his job in 2013, that he was open to either a winter tournament or moving the tournament to another country. FIFA executive committee member Theo Zwanziger said that awarding the 2022 World Cup to Qatar's desert state was a "blatant mistake", and that any potential shift to a winter event would be unmanageable due to the effect on major European domestic leagues.

In October 2013, a taskforce was commissioned to consider alternative dates, and report after the 2014 World Cup in Brazil. In early 2014, FIFA Secretary-General Jerome Valcke appeared to preempt this, saying: "Frankly, I think it will happen between November 15 and the end of December because that is when the weather is more favourable. It's more like springtime in Europe". This was controversial within FIFA itself, due to a possible conflict with the Christmas season, and Vice-president Jim Boyce responded by saying that "it absolutely has not been decided as far as the executive committee are concerned.

It was agreed all the stakeholders should meet, all the stakeholders should have an input and then the decision would be made, and that decision as far as I understand will not be taken until the end of 2014 or the March executive meeting in 2015. As it stands it remains in the summer with no decision expected until end of 2014 or March 2015". Another option to combat heat problems was changing the date of the World Cup to the northern hemisphere's winter, when the climate in Qatar would be cooler. However, this proved just as problematic as doing so would disrupt the calendar of a number of domestic leagues, particularly in Europe.

Franz Beckenbauer, a member of FIFA's executive committee, said Qatar could be allowed to host the 2022 World Cup in winter. He justified his proposal on the grounds that Qatar would be saving money, which otherwise they would have spent in cooling the stadiums. Beckenbauer said: "One should think about another solution. In January and February you have comfortable 25 °C (77 °F) there". "Qatar won the vote and deserves a fair chance as the first host from the Middle East". At a ceremony in Qatar marking the occasion of having been awarded the World Cup, FIFA President Sepp Blatter later agreed that this suggestion was plausible, but FIFA later clarified that any change from the bid position of a June–July games would be for the host association to propose. Beckenbauer would later receive a 90-day ban from any football-related activity from FIFA after refusing to cooperate in the investigation of bribery.

The notion of holding the Cup during Europe's winter was further boosted by UEFA President Michel Platini indicating that he was ready to rearrange the European club competitions accordingly. Platini's vote for the summer 2022 World Cup went to Qatar. FIFA President Sepp Blatter also said that despite air-conditioned stadiums the event was more than the games itself and involved other cultural events. In this regard, he questioned if fans and players could take part in the summer temperatures.

In addition to objections by European leagues, Frank Lowy, chairman of Football Federation Australia, said a change of the 2022 World Cup date from summer to winter would upset the schedule of the A-League and said they would seek compensation from FIFA should the decision go ahead. Richard Scudamore, chief executive of the Premier League, stated that they would consider legal action against FIFA because a move would interfere with the Premier League's popular Christmas and New Year fixture programme.

In September 2013, it was alleged that FIFA had held talks with broadcasters over the decision to change the date of the World Cup as doing so could cause potential clashes with other scheduled television programming. The Fox Broadcasting Company who had paid $425 million for the right to broadcast both the 2018 and 2022 World Cups in the US, later voiced anger over the possible season switch, as doing so would clash with that year's NFL season, which takes place in the winter and with whom Fox also has a lucrative broadcasting deal. The network said they bought the rights with the understanding the tournament would take place in the summer, and if the change did go ahead they would seek compensation.

In February 2015, FIFA awarded Fox the rights to the 2026 World Cup, without opening it up for bidding with ESPN, NBC, and other interested American broadcasters. Richard Sandomir of The New York Times reported that FIFA did so to avoid Fox from suing in U.S. courts, which under the American legal system could force FIFA to open up their books and expose any possible corruption. As BBC sports editor Dan Roan observed, "It does not seem to matter to FIFA that rival networks ESPN and NBC may have wanted to bid, or that more money could have been generated for the good of the sport had a proper auction been held. As ever, it seemed, FIFA was looking after itself".

On 24 February 2015, it was announced that a winter World Cup would go ahead in favour of the traditional summertime event. The event was scheduled to be held between November and December. Commentators noted the clash with the Christmas season was likely to cause disruption, whilst there was concern for how short the tournament was intended to be. It was also confirmed that the 2023 Africa Cup of Nations would be moved from January to June to prevent African players from having a relatively quick two-week turnaround, although the monsoonal rainy season in its host country Guinea starts about that time.

=== Climate ===
As the World Cup usually occurs during the northern hemisphere's summer, the weather in Qatar was a concern with temperatures reaching more than 50 °C (122 °F). Two doctors from Qatar's Aspetar sports hospital in Doha who gave an interview in November 2010 to Qatar Today magazine said the climate would be an issue, stating that the region's climate would "affect performance levels from a health point of view" of professional athletes, specifically footballers, that "recovery times between games would be longer" than in a temperate climate and that, on the field of play, "more mistakes would be made". One of the doctors said that "total acclimation (to the Qatari climate) is impossible".

The inspection team for evaluating who would host the tournament said that Qatar was "high risk" due to the weather. FIFA President Sepp Blatter initially rejected the criticism, but in September 2013 said the FIFA executive committee would evaluate the feasibility of a winter event instead of a summer one.

==== Move to November and December ====
Owing to the climate in Qatar, concerns were expressed over holding the World Cup in its traditional time frame of June and July. In October 2013, a task force was commissioned to consider alternative dates and report after the 2014 FIFA World Cup in Brazil. On 24 February 2015, the FIFA Task Force proposed that the tournament be played from late November to late December 2022, to avoid the summer heat between May and September and also avoid clashing with the 2022 Winter Olympics in February, the 2022 Winter Paralympics in March and Ramadan in April.

The notion of staging the tournament in November was controversial because it would interfere with the regular season schedules of some domestic leagues around the world. Commentators noted the clash with the Christian Christmas season was likely to cause disruption, whilst there was concern about how short the tournament was intended to be. FIFA executive committee member Theo Zwanziger said that awarding the 2022 World Cup to Qatar was a "blatant mistake".

Frank Lowy, chairman of Football Federation Australia, said that if the 2022 World Cup were moved to November and thus upset the schedule of the A-League, they would seek compensation from FIFA. Richard Scudamore, chief executive of the Premier League, stated that they would consider legal action against FIFA because a move would interfere with the Premier League's popular Christmas and New Year fixture programme. On 19 March 2015, FIFA sources confirmed that the final would be played on 18 December.

Critics condemned the Euro-centrism of these allegations, and questioned why global sporting events must be held within the traditional European summer season.

=== Cost ===
At an estimated cost of over $220 billion, it is the most expensive World Cup ever held to date; this figure is disputed by Qatari officials, including organising CEO Nasser Al Khater, who said the true cost was $8 billion, and other figures related to overall infrastructure development since the World Cup was awarded to Qatar in 2010.

By some estimates, the World Cup is set to cost Qatar approximately US$220 billion (£184 billion). This is about 60 times the $3.5 billion that South Africa spent on the 2010 FIFA World Cup. Nicola Ritter, a German legal and financial analyst, told an investors' summit held in Munich that £107 billion would be spent on stadiums and facilities plus a further £31 billion on transport infrastructure. Ritter said £30 billion would be spent on building air-conditioned stadiums with £48 billion on training facilities and accommodation for players and fans. A further £28 billion will be spent on creating a new city called Lusail that will surround the stadium that will host the opening and final matches of the tournament.

According to a report released in April 2013 by Merrill Lynch, the investment banking division of Bank of America, the organisers in Qatar have requested from FIFA to approve a smaller number of stadiums due to the growing costs. Bloomberg.com said that Qatar wishes to cut the number of venues to 8 or 9 from the 12 originally planned. A report released in December 2010 quoted FIFA President Sepp Blatter as stating that Qatar's neighbours could host some matches during the World Cup. However, no specific countries were named in the report. Blatter added that any such decision must be taken by Qatar first and then endorsed by FIFA's executive committee. Prince Ali bin Al Hussein of Jordan told the Australian Associated Press that holding games in Bahrain, United Arab Emirates, and possibly Saudi Arabia would help to accommodate the people of the region during the tournament.

== Qatari football record ==
At the time of being awarded the tournament in 2010, Qatar was ranked 113 in the world, and had never qualified for the World Cup before. The most prestigious accolade the team had won was the Arabian Gulf Cup twice, both times hosting. Since being awarded the tournament, they have also won the Arabian Gulf Cup for a third time in 2014 and the AFC Asian Cup in 2019. Qatar became the smallest country by land area to host the World Cup (less than half the size of 1954 hosts Switzerland, when the tournament consisted of 16 teams). These facts led some to question the strength of football culture in Qatar and if that made them unsuitable World Cup hosts.

The Qatar Football Association has also been known to naturalise players from foreign nations for its own team. Examples include Sebastián Soria, Luiz Júnior and Emerson Sheik. The Qatar FA has previously attempted to offer incentives to uncapped players of other nations to switch allegiance to the Gulf state. These have included the German-based Brazilian trio of Aílton, Dedé and Leandro in 2004 – none of whom have ever played in or have other connections to Qatar – to help their team qualify for the 2006 FIFA World Cup. FIFA blocked the moves and as a result, tightened eligibility requirements for national teams.

With a 2–0 loss to Ecuador on the tournament's opening day, Qatar became the first host nation to lose their opening match at the World Cup; Qatar subsequently lost 3–1 to Senegal in their second group match, becoming the first team to be eliminated from the tournament after the Netherlands drew 1-1 vs Ecuador later (putting both on four points, Senegal with three and Qatar with zero). They lost their final group game 2–0 to the Netherlands, becoming the first host to lose all three games, as well as the first host to finish 4th in their group and last in the overall rankings. As of co-host Canada defeating Qatar 6-0 in the following tournament (alongside Mexico and the United States winning their games), Qatar remains the only team to not win a match in the tournament they hosted.

== Human rights ==
=== Lack of recognition of Israel ===
==== Possible Israeli qualification ====
The head of the Qatar bid delegation stated that if Israel were to qualify, they would be able to compete in the World Cup despite Qatar not recognising the state of Israel. Israel ultimately were eliminated during FIFA World Cup qualification, and thus did not compete at the tournament in Qatar.

==== Treatment of Jewish and Israeli fans ====
It was reported that Qatar went back on its word to provide cooked kosher food and public Jewish prayer services at the 2022 World Cup, banning both activities. Qatar alleged that they could not "secure" the safety of publicly praying Jewish tourists, whilst many foreign Jews complained that they subsequently had no food available to eat. It was estimated that 10,000 religious Jews from Israel and around the world arrived to watch the World Cup in Qatar.

Multiple Israeli reporters at the tournament reported fans from Arab nations waving Palestinian flags and chanting anti-Israeli slogans. Some Israelis reported that they had been escorted out of restaurants when their nationality was revealed. The Israeli government warned its citizens who are travelling to the tournament to hide their Israeli identity out of safety concerns. Moav Vardi of Kan 11 stated that Arab fan chants included, "You are not welcome here, there is only Palestine, there is no such thing as Israel, Israel does not exist", with some turning back when the Israeli reporters disclosed that they were Jewish. Muslims and Morocco football team players also raised Palestinian flags during the matches.

Qatar had previously promised to provide Jewish tourists with cooked kosher food and public Jewish prayer services at the 2022 World Cup. However, shortly before the World Cup began, both were banned by Qatar, who claimed it could not secure the safety of Jews.

Qatar alleged that they could not "secure" the safety of publicly praying Jewish tourists, whilst many foreign Jews complained that they subsequently had no food available to eat. It was estimated that 10,000 religious Jews from Israel and around the world arrived to watch the World Cup in Qatar.

Whilst Jewish organisations complained of being unable to find cooked kosher food, the Israeli government said it was happy with the efforts made by Qatar to meet its requests, including kosher food, direct flights from Israel to Qatar, and temporary diplomatic representation in the country. A kosher kitchen under the supervision of Rabbi Mendy Chitrik was open in time for the first match. Rabbi Marc Schneier, president of The Foundation for Ethnic Understanding, said he had never asked the Qatari government for cooked food, and he had been the only person in communication with the Qataris regarding making the World Cup experience inclusive for Jews.

Multiple Israeli reporters at the tournament reported fans from Arab nations waving Palestinian flags and chanting anti-Israeli slogans. Some Israelis reported that they had been escorted out of restaurants when their nationality was revealed. The Israeli government warned its citizens travelling to the tournament to hide their Israeli identity out of safety concerns.

=== Lack of LGBT rights ===
When Qatar was selected to host the 2022 FIFA World Cup, the choice to do so in a restrictive nation saw much criticism, with several topics becoming the subject of controversy. The security of fans was a point of discussion. Qatari officials stated that all people are welcome as long as they follow the public display of affection laws which apply to everyone. At the World Cup, security officials at stadiums confiscated items of rainbow clothing, flags featuring rainbows, whether Pride-related or not, and reportedly intimidated fans. American journalist Grant Wahl was briefly detained for wearing a t-shirt with a rainbow on it.

=== Lack of women's rights ===
Qatar discriminating against women was also criticised. Women in Qatar have few freedoms, as they must obtain permission from their male guardians to marry, study abroad on government scholarships, work in many government jobs, travel abroad, receive certain forms of reproductive health care, and act as the primary guardian of children, even if they are divorced.

Qatar attracted particular criticism for an incident where a Mexican employee of the World Cup Organising Committee was accused of allegedly having sex outside of marriage. The woman had previously reported rape, while the male claimed to have been in a relationship with her, after which the woman was investigated for extramarital sex. Women in Qatar face the possible penalty of flagellation and a seven-year prison sentence if convicted for having sex outside of marriage. The criminal case was eventually dropped months after she was allowed to leave Qatar.

== Prohibition of alcohol ==
Hassan Abdulla al Thawadi, chief executive of the Qatar 2022 World Cup bid, said the Muslim state would also permit alcohol consumption during the event. Specific fan-zones would be established where alcohol could be bought. Although expatriates may purchase alcohol and certain businesses may sell alcohol with a permit, drinking in public is not permitted as Qatar's legal system is based on Sharia.

In February 2022, the communications executive director at the supreme committee, Fatma Al-Nuaimi, stated in an interview that alcohol would be available in designated fan zones outside stadiums and in other Qatari official hospitality venues. In July 2022, it was reported that while fans would be allowed to bring alcoholic beverages into the stadiums, alcoholic beverages would not be sold inside the stadiums. But according to a source, "the plans are still being finalised." However, on 18 November 2022, days before the first match, Qatar officially banned alcoholic beverages from sale within the eight stadiums.

On 30 November 2022, The Times published an interview with some female fans attending FIFA World Cup 2022 games, with some of them saying that less drunkenness among other attendees made them feel safer at the stadiums than they expected.

As part of the Qatari bid, alcohol was to be permitted to be consumed around the stadiums. This was in contradiction to Qatari law which prohibits public consumption of alcohol and limits its consumption to high-end hotels. It was agreed that Budweiser, FIFA's largest sponsor, would be permitted to sell their beer in designated areas in the stadium. Eight days before the tournament Qatari officials informed AB InBev, the owners of Budweiser, that the beer tents were to be moved to less prominent areas and were no longer authorized inside the stadiums but still within the stadium perimeter.

Two days before the tournament, on 18 November 2022, FIFA released a statement that sale points of beer would be removed from stadium perimeters in contradiction to both the Qatari bid and the earlier commitment when the sales were moved outside of the stadiums. FIFA's response was questioned as FIFA had forced recent World Cup hosts, such as Brazil, to change their laws to allow alcohol consumption at matches in line with sponsorship commitments. Alcohol was still permitted, however, inside the fan villages and inside the stadiums in the corporate hospitality boxes, leading to claims of double standards.

Regarding the last-minute Qatari ban on the sale of beer at the stadiums, Infantino proclaimed in his press conference: "I think personally, if for three hours a day you cannot drink a beer, you will survive."
