= Jewish views on Muhammad =

Views of the Jewish religion on the Islamic prophet Muhammad

Very few texts in Judaism refer to or take note of the Islamic prophet, Muhammad. Those that do generally reject Muhammad's proclamation of receiving divine revelations from God.

== References to Muhammad ==
In the Middle Ages, it was common for Jewish writers to describe Muhammad as ha-meshuggah ("the madman"), a term frequently used in the Bible for those who believe themselves to be prophets.

=== Maimonides ===
Maimonides referred to Muhammad only once in explicitly negative terms, in his Epistle to Yemen. While addressing the Yemenite Jewish community during a period of Almohad persecution, he used the Judeo-Arabic expression al-mutanabbī al-majnūn (“the crazy claimant to prophecy”). This terminology appears only in this private letter and does not reflect his broader legal or philosophical positions. In the Mishneh Torah, Maimonides held that Muslims are strict monotheists and “are not idolaters at all,” and in the Guide for the Perplexed he stated that Islam eradicated idolatry from the Arabs and attributes “no defect” to God. By contrast, he classified Christian Trinitarian doctrine as a form of idolatry.

In his authoritative work of law, the Mishneh Torah (Hilkhot Melakhim 11:10–12), Maimonides indicated that, nevertheless, Muhammad was part of God's plan of preparing the world for the coming of the Jewish Messiah: "All those words of Jesus of Nazareth and of this Ishmaelite [i.e., Muhammad] who arose after him are only to make straight the path for the messianic king and to prepare the whole world to serve the Lord together. As it is said: 'For then I will change the speech of the peoples to a pure speech so that all of them shall call on the name of the Lord and serve him with one accord' (Zephaniah 3:9)."

=== Obscure and indirect references ===
Natan'el al-Fayyumi, a prominent 12th-century Yemenite rabbi and theologian, and the founder of what is sometimes called "Jewish Ismailism," wrote in his philosophical treatise Bustan al-Uqul ("Garden of the Minds") that God sends prophets to establish religions for other nations, which do not have to conform to the precepts of the Jewish Torah. Nethanel explicitly considered Muhammad a true prophet who was sent from Heaven with a particular message that applies to the Arabs, but not to the Jews. Al-Fayyumi's explicit acceptance of Muhammad's prophecy was rare and virtually unknown until recent times beyond his native Yemen.

The apocalyptic Midrash The Secrets of Rabbi Simon ben Yohai compares Muhammad to the Jewish Messiah. According to this text, ascribed to the famous 1st-century sage and mystic Simeon bar Yochai, and thought to have been written at the beginning of the Muslim conquest or in the 8th century, Muhammad's role as a prophet includes redeeming the Jews from the Christian ("Roman" or "Edomite") oppression and playing a positive role in the messianic process.

A number of stories from the Islamic tradition about Muhammad entered mainstream Jewish thought incidentally due to the great cultural convergence in Al-Andalus from the 9th to 12th centuries, known as the Golden Age of Iberian Jewry. For example, Rabbi Jacob Joseph of Polonne, one of the early Hasidic mystics, wrote that one pious man (hasid) taught that the internal struggle against the evil inclination is greater than external battle, quoting Bahya ibn Paquda's popular treatise Chovot HaLevavot. In the Judeo-Arabic original version of that book, Bahya Ibn Paquda refers to both external and internal battles as jihad and the "pious man" about whom the story is told initially is Muhammad, though the author does not mention his source by name.

== See also ==
- Judaism's view of Jesus
- Islamic-Jewish relations
- Muhammad's views on Jews
- Muhammad and the Bible
