= Muhammad's views on Jews =

Views of the Islamic prophet Muhammad on the Jewish people

The Islamic prophet Muhammad's views on Jews were formed through the contact he had with Jewish tribes living in and around Medina. His views on Jews include his theological teaching of them as People of the Book (Ahl al-Kitab or Talmid ), his description of them as earlier receivers of Abrahamic revelation; and the failed political alliances between the Muslim and Jewish communities.

As stated in the Quran, after his migration (hijra) to Medina from his home-town of Mecca in 622 CE, he established an agreement known as the Constitution of Medina between the major Medinan factions, including the Jewish tribes of Banu Qaynuqa, Banu Nadir, and Banu Qurayza that secured equal rights for both Jews and Muslims as long as Jews remained politically supportive. However, the alliance began to fray in 624 CE after a dispute with the Banu Qaynuqa, which was soon followed by disputes with the Banu Nadir and Banu Qurayza as well.

== Muhammad and the Jewish tribes of Medina ==
=== Reception of Muhammad by Jewish contemporaries ===
In the course of Muhammad's proselytizing in Mecca, he viewed Christians and Jews, both of whom he referred to as "People of the Book", as natural allies, sharing the core principles of his teachings, and anticipated their acceptance and support. Muslims, like Jews, were at that time praying towards Jerusalem. During the height of Muslim persecution in Mecca, Muhammad was offered the position of arbitrator in the highly diverse Medina, which had a large Jewish community.

Many Medinans converted to the faith of the Meccan immigrants both before and after Muhammad's emigration in 622 CE, but only a few came from Jewish backgrounds because most of the Jewish community rejected Muhammad's status as a prophet. Their opposition "may well have been for political as well as religious reasons". According to Watt, "Jews would normally be unwilling to admit that a non-Jew could be a prophet." Mark Cohen adds that Muhammad was appearing "centuries after the cessation of biblical prophecy" and "couched his message in a verbiage foreign to Judaism both in its format and rhetoric."

As Muhammad taught of new Islamic prophets (such as Lot, and Jesus) and that his message was identical to those of Abraham and Moses, the Jews were furthermore in the position to make some Muslims doubt about his prophethood. Judaism does not list Lot, nor Jesus as Prophets in Judaism, and the Talmud (Sanhedrin 11a) states that Haggai, Zachariah, and Malachi were the last prophets, all of whom lived at the end of the 70-year Babylonian exile, and nowadays only the "Bath Kol" (בת קול, lit. daughter of a voice, "voice of God") exists. The Jews, according to Watt, could argue that "some passages in the Qur'an contradicted their ancient scriptures". Watt also states that many of the Jews had close links with Abd-Allah ibn Ubayy, "the potential prince of Medina" who "is said that but for the arrival of Muhammad, had not become" the chief arbitrator of the community. The Jews may have hoped for greater influence if Ubayy had become a ruler. Watt writes that the Islamic response to these criticisms was:

The Qur'an, met these intellectual criticisms by developing the conception of the religion of Abraham. While the knowledge of Abraham came from the Old Testament and material based on that, Abraham could be regarded as the ancestor of the Arabs through Ishmael. It was also an undeniable fact that he was not a Jew or Christian, since the Jews are either to be taken as the followers of Moses or as the descendants of Abraham's grandson, Jacob. At the same time Abraham had stood for the worship of God alone. The Qur'an therefore claimed that it was restoring the pure monotheism of Abraham which had been corrupted in various, clearly specified ways by Jews, and Christians.

Watt states that the charge of altering the scripture may mean no more than giving false interpretations to some passages, though in contemporary Islam it is taken to refer to textual corruption. The corruption of previously revealed books is referred to as tahrif. The Qur'an also stated that there was nothing surprising in Muhammad's rejection by Jews, as that had occurred to other prophets mentioned in Jewish scripture. Watt claims that the Qur'an "also went on to criticize Jewish exaggerations of their claim to be the chosen people" and argued against the supposed claim of the Jews of Medina "that they alone had a true knowledge of God". The Qur'an also criticized the Jews for believing that Ezra is the Son of God, a claim unattested either in Jewish or other extra-Qur'anic sources. Michael Cook considers the charge of considering Ezra as the Son of God to be petty or obscure. The Encyclopedia Judaica article on Ezra says, "Muhammed claims (Sura 9:30) that in the opinion of the Jews, Uzayr (Ezra) is the son of God. These words are enigma because no such opinion is to be found among the Jews, even though Ezra was singled out for special appreciation (see Sanh. 21b; Yev. 86b)."

In the Constitution of Medina, Jews were given equality to Muslims in exchange for political loyalty.

According to The Jewish Encyclopedia, Muhammad became increasingly hostile to the Jews over time. He grew to perceive that there were irreconcilable differences between their religion and his, especially when the belief in his prophetic mission became the criterion of a true Muslim." When the Jewish community challenged "the way in which the Quran appropriated Biblical accounts and personages; for instance, its making Abraham an Arab and the founder of the Kaa’bah at Mecca" Muhammad "accused them of intentionally concealing its true meaning or of entirely misunderstanding it, and taunted them with being."

According to E.H. Palmer in his 1880 translation of the Qu'ran, "When it became obvious that Islâmism and Judaism could not amalgamate, and that the Jews would never accept him for their prophet, Mohammed withdrew his concessions one by one, changed the qiblah or point to which he turned in prayer from Jerusalem which he had at first adopted to the Kaabah at Mecca, substituted the fast of Ramadhân for the Jewish fasts which he had prescribed, and, in short, regarded them as the irreconcilable enemies of his creed." According to Marshall Hodgson, Muhammad was disappointed that the Jews of Medina rejected his prophethood; he also felt threatened: "As interpreters of monotheism, the Jews had undoubted seniority over the Muslims and were already respected in Medina. As long as they challenged his authority, a single bad turn of fortune might make his position untenable." After a clash occurred between some Muslims and the Banu Qaynuqa (one of the Jewish tribes of Medina), Muhammad besieged the tribe until they accepted exile from Medina while keeping their property.

=== Banu Qurayza ===
After the Battle of the Trench in 627, the Jews of Banu Qurayza were accused of conspiring with the Meccans. According to Watt, though the Banu Qurayza do not appear to have committed any overt hostile act and been overtly correct in their behavior, they had most likely been involved in negotiations with the enemy." Marco Scholler believes the Banu Qurayza were "openly, probably actively," supporting Meccans and their allies. Nasr writes that it was discovered that Qurayzah had been complicit with the enemy during the battle.

A minority of Muslim scholars reject the incident holding that Ibn Ishaq, the first biographer of Muhammad, supposedly gathered many details of the incident from descendants of the Qurayza Jews themselves. These descendants allegedly embellished or manufactured details of the incident by borrowing from histories of Jewish persecutions during Roman times.

The Quran contains an indictment of Medinan Jews and Christians who rejected the bayyina of the Prophet, the clear evidence on the basis of which man chooses obedience or rejection of God.

Indeed, those who disbelieve from the People of the Book and the polytheists will be in the Fire of Hell, to stay there forever. They are the worst of all beings.

This verse is referring to the fate of those who reject the message of Islam, including both the People of the Scripture (Jews and Christians) and polytheists (those who worship multiple gods). It also describes them as the "worst of creatures," highlighting the severity of their disbelief in the eyes of Islam. However, this verse is only referring to the greatest of sinners, as clarified in the following verse.

== See also ==
- Islam and Judaism
- Judaism's view of Muhammad
- Mukhayriq
