= Natan'el al-Fayyumi =

Jewish writer

Natanʾel al-Fayyumi (Arabic: ناتانئيل الفيومي, romanized: Nātānʾil al-Fayyūmī, lit. 'Nathaniel of Pithom'; c. 1090 – c. 1165) was the twelfth-century Yemenite Jewish author of Garden of the Intellects (Hebrew: גן השכלים, romanized: Gan ha-Śəḵālīm; Judeo-Arabic: בסתאן אלעקול, romanized: Bustān al-ʿUqūl, lit. 'Garden [of] the Intellect[s]'). Written in medieval Judeo-Yemeni Arabic, the text was a response to Bahya ibn Paquda's book Duties of the Heart which was composed to counter some of ibn Paquda's claims about the tenents and principles of Rabbinic Judaism. For example, al-Fayyumi wrote in the third chapter that God's unity is far greater than that described by ibn Paquda.

Al-Fayyumi was influenced by Ismaʿili Islam, and specifically by Tayyibi Isma'ilism, the faith of the Banu Hamdan dynasties ruling most of contemporary South Arabia during his lifetime. He argued that God sent different prophets to the world's various peoples, each containing legislations suited to the particular temperament of each nation. In the sixth chapter of the book, al-Fayyumi writes, "Know, my brother, that it is not inconceivable for God to send to the world who He wants when He wants… and He, may He be blessed, already sent the nations prophets before the giving of the Torah… and it is not inconceivable for God to send who He wants after giving the Torah as well, so that the world will not remain without faith."

However, al-Fayyumi's explicit acceptance of Muhammad's status as a prophet may be unique, and was virtually unknown until recent times beyond his native Yemen. Yosef Qafih, the editor and translator of Fayyumi's Judeo-Arabic Bustān al-ʿUqul, asserts that due to Muslim attempts to catch Jews saying something against their faith–one who said that Muhammad was a false prophet would be judged for death–Nathanʾel was compelled to teach his people arguments and responses that would save them from ensnarement.

Muslim teachings speak of an evolutionary sequence of prophetic revelations, culminating in the messianic Qa'im Al Muhammad era, which would unite all humanity in acknowledging God. Ismaili doctrine acknowledges that a single universal religious truth lies at the root of the different religions. Each historical revelation plays a role in preparing the path for that universal truth.

Within a single generation, Natan'el's son Jacob was compelled to turn to Maimonides, asking urgently for counsel on how to deal with a new wave of religious persecutions and forced conversions that was threatening the Jews of Yemen, an exchange which prompted Maimonides to compose his famous Epistle to Yemen. The letters and intellectual dialogue between Jacob, Maimonides, and Saladin had a lasting effect upon Yemenite Judaism.

== Etymology ==
There is a dispute between Yosef Qafih and historian Yehuda Ratzaby as to the origin of the nisba al-Fayyūmī. According to Ratzaby, it is a demonym derived from the name of his ancestors' place of origin, the Faiyum in Egypt. Qafih, dissenting, thinks the name to be only a given name to the father of Natan'el, who was named "Fayyumi," a name that many children in Yemen were then affectionately called owing to the love the people had for Saadia Gaon al-Fayyumi.

== See also ==
- Jewish views on Muhammad
- Islamic–Jewish relations
- Religious pluralism
