= Nahum Ma'arabi =

Nahum Ma'arabi (Hebrew: נחום מערבי, literally "Nahum of the west"; also called Ma'aravi or Maghrabi) was a Moroccan Hebrew poet and translator of the thirteenth century.

His poems are found only in Moroccan collections. Two of his liturgical poems were published by Leopold Dukes in Zur Kentniss der Hebräischen Poesie. Ma'arabi translated Maimonides' "Iggeret Teman" from Arabic into Hebrew and added a preface in verse. This was published in Basel in 1631. He also translated a commentary on the "Sefer Yeẓirah" by Isaac Israeli ben Solomon or Nissim ben Jacob, prefacing it with a poem. Another of his translations was Joseph ibn Tzaddik's "Microcosmos." The translation is anonymous, but Moritz Steinschneider attributes it to Ma'arabi. Finally, he translated Saadia Gaon's commentary on the thirteen hermeneutic rules of Rabbi Ishmael.
