= Letter to an Anti-Zionist Friend =

Apocryphal text wrongly ascribed to Martin Luther King Jr.

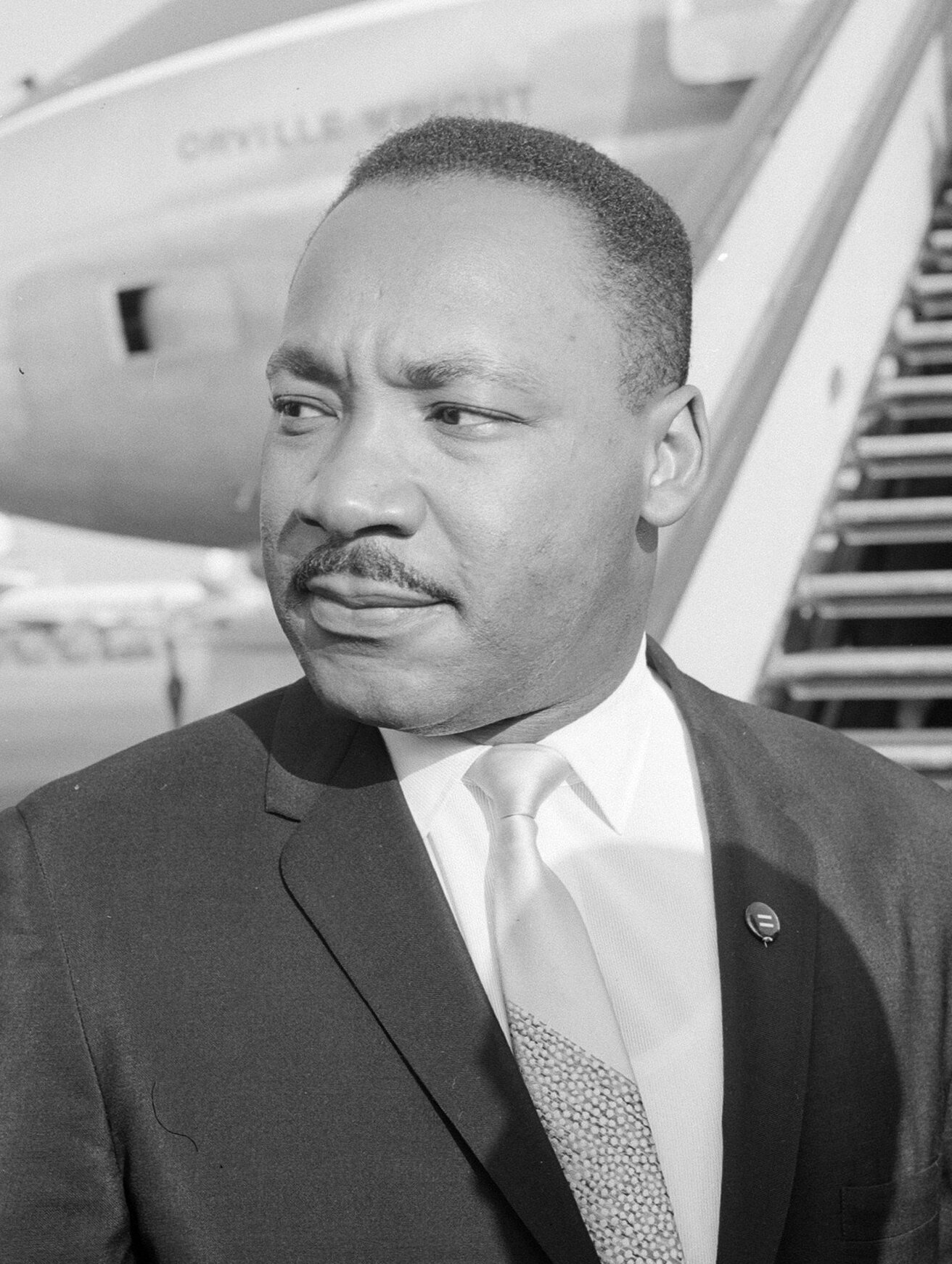
Martin Luther King Jr. in 1964

"Letter to an Anti-Zionist Friend" is an open letter falsely attributed to civil rights activist Martin Luther King Jr. that expressed support for Zionism and declared that "anti-Zionist is inherently anti-Semitic, and ever will be so."

== History ==
The forgery may have been inspired by a statement claimed to have been made by King at a dinner event in Cambridge, Massachusetts, according to a book by Seymour Martin Lipset, published by the Anti-Defamation League approximately a year after King's death. Lipset, who was present at that dinner, wrote that an African American student made a statement sharply critical of Zionists at the dinner that Lipset recalled as having taken place "shortly before he was assassinated". Lipset wrote that King replied: "Don't talk like that. When people criticize Zionists, they mean Jews. You're talking anti-Semitism."

According to Eric Sundquist, "eventually, through channels that are difficult to pin down", this quotation was transformed into a text purportedly by King titled 'Letter to an Anti-Zionist Friend,' which supposedly appeared in an August 1967 issue of Saturday Review and was purportedly reprinted in a book This I Believe: Selections from the Writings of Dr. Martin Luther King Jr. However, no such letter was published in any of the four Saturday Review issues released that month, and no book by that name has been located. The letter was not found in the King archives at Boston University.

There appear to be no references to the letter before 1999. Tim Wise suggests that it originated with Marc Schneier, who published portions of it in Shared Dreams: Martin Luther King Jr. and the Jewish Community that year. Martin Luther King III wrote the preface to Shared Dreams.

According to a Harvard Crimson article published days after King's death, King had not been to Cambridge since April 23, 1967. However, Martin Kramer found that King had been in Boston on October 27, 1967, where he spoke at the Cambridge home of Marty Peretz, then an instructor of Social Studies at Harvard, and rebuked an anti-Zionist student in Lipset's presence.

The letter was quoted by Ariel Sharon before the Knesset on January 26, 2005. It was also cited by the Anti-Defamation League in testimony before the United States House of Representatives. Other prominent individuals quoting the letter include Natan Sharansky and Mortimer Zuckerman.

== Correspondence with King's views ==
According to Sundquist, King "paid frequent tribute to Jewish support for black rights, defended Israel's right to exist, supported the Jewish state during the Six-Day War (while calling for a negotiated settlement in keeping with his advocacy of nonviolence), and on more than one occasion opposed the anti-Zionism then taking increasing hold in the Black Power movement." According to Sundquist, while the letter is a hoax, the sentiments it expresses "are in no way at odds with King's views."

Wise asserts that King "appears never to have made any public comment about Zionism per se." According to Wise, the Lipset quote does not support the claim that opposition to Zionism was inherently antisemitic, and the comment in question may have been limited to the specific circumstances: "As for what King would say today about Israel, Zionism, and the Palestinian struggle, one can only speculate."
