= Islamic–Jewish relations =

Religious ties between Muslims and the Jewish people have existed since the founding of Islam in the Arabian Peninsula in the 7th century; Muhammad's views on Jews were shaped by his extensive contact with the Jewish tribes of Arabia during his lifetime. Islam shares similar values, guidelines, and principles with the Jewish religion, and also incorporates Jewish history as a part of its own. Muslims regard the Israelites, to whom Jews and Samaritans trace their ethnic ancestry, as an important religious concept; they are referenced around 43 times in the Quran, excluding individual prophets, and in many accounts of hadith. Similarly, Moses, the most important Jewish prophet, is also regarded by Muslims as an Islamic prophet and messenger (see: Moses in Islam); his name is mentioned in the Quran 136 times—more than any other individual—and his life is narrated and recounted more than that of any other prophet. The Torah, which is the compilation of the first five books of the Hebrew Bible, is also held by Muslims as an Islamic holy book that was revealed by God (or Allah) through various Israelite prophets and messengers (see: Torah in Islam). Later rabbinic authorities and Jewish scholars, such as Maimonides, engaged in discussions concerning the relationship between Islam and Jewish religious law. Maimonides himself, it has been argued, was influenced by Islamic legal thought while living in the caliphates of his time.

Although the origins of Judaism go back to the time of the ancient Hebrews, it is considered to have started becoming a distinct religion in its own right in the Kingdom of Judah, where it developed as a strictly monotheistic outgrowth of Yahwism. Thus, with a difference of at least 2,000 years, Judaism and Islam share a common geographical origin in what is known today as the Middle East, with the former from the Southern Levant and the latter from the Hejaz. Additionally, both religions claim Abraham as their spiritual patriarch and are thereby classified as Abrahamic religions. Islam was strongly influenced by Judaism in its fundamental religious outlook, structure, jurisprudence, and practice. Because of this similarity, as well as through the influence of Islamic culture and philosophy on the Jewish populations in the Muslim world, there has been considerable and continued physical, theological, and political overlap between the two religions since Islam's founding. Notably, the first Islamic Waqf was donated by a Jew named Mukhayriq, who was a rabbi in the city of Medina. In 1027, the Jewish polymath Samuel ibn Naghrillah became top advisor and military general of the Taifa of Granada in the Muslim-controlled Iberian Peninsula.

The Jewish people are among the three original "People of the Book" of Islam, which recognizes them, Christians, and Sabians as followers of the pre-Islamic revelations of Allah. Ties between the two communities have been marked by periods of cooperation, of ambivalence, and of open conflict. The early Muslims fought battles with a number of the Jewish tribes of Arabia, such as the Banu Qurayza, and Jews were persecuted at times under Muslim rule in subsequent centuries. Most recently, the Arab–Israeli conflict has resulted in heightened tensions between Jews and Muslims, including the perpetuation of antisemitism and Islamophobia.

== Religious figures ==
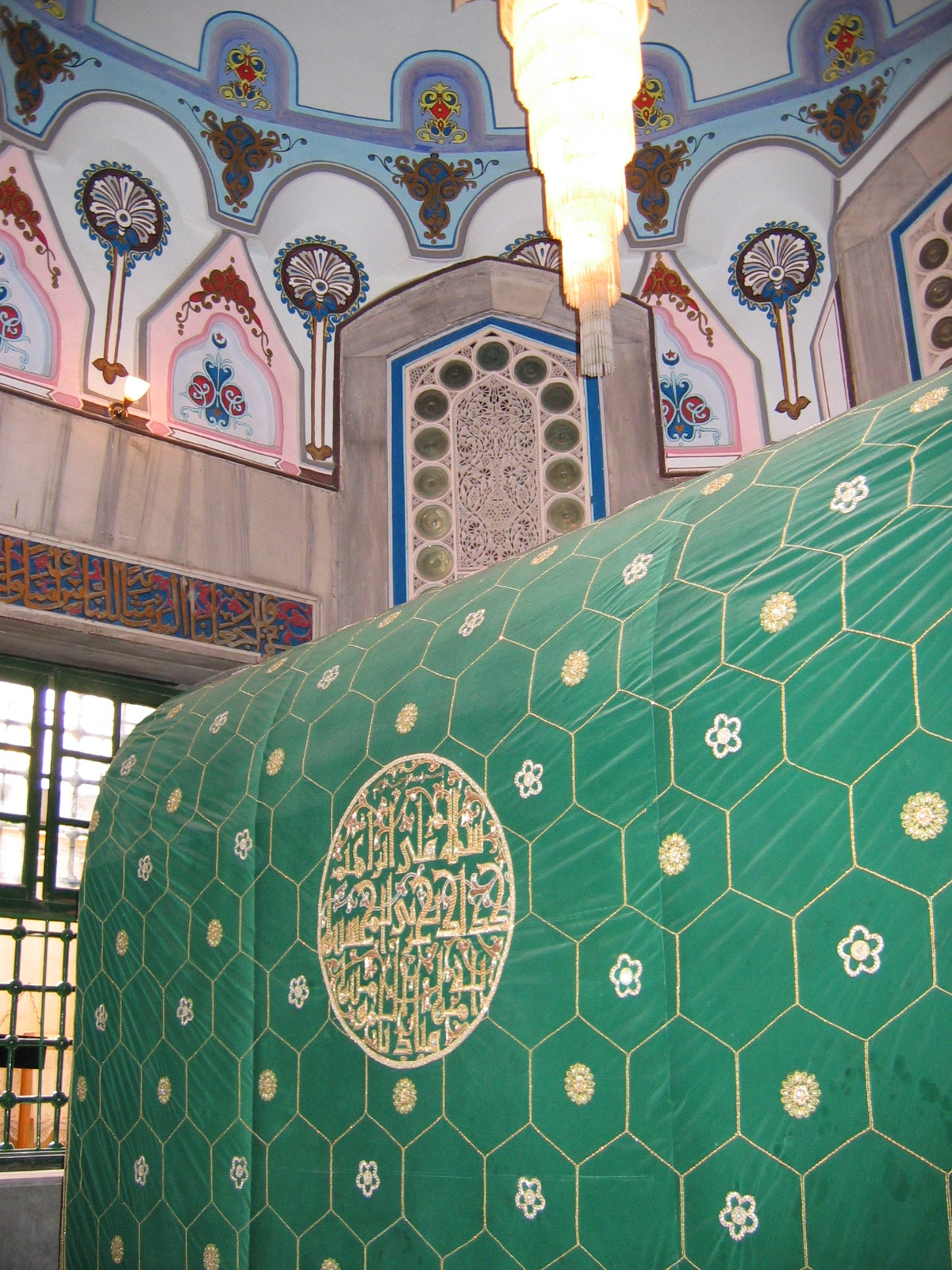
The Cave of the Patriarchs, burial place of Abraham.

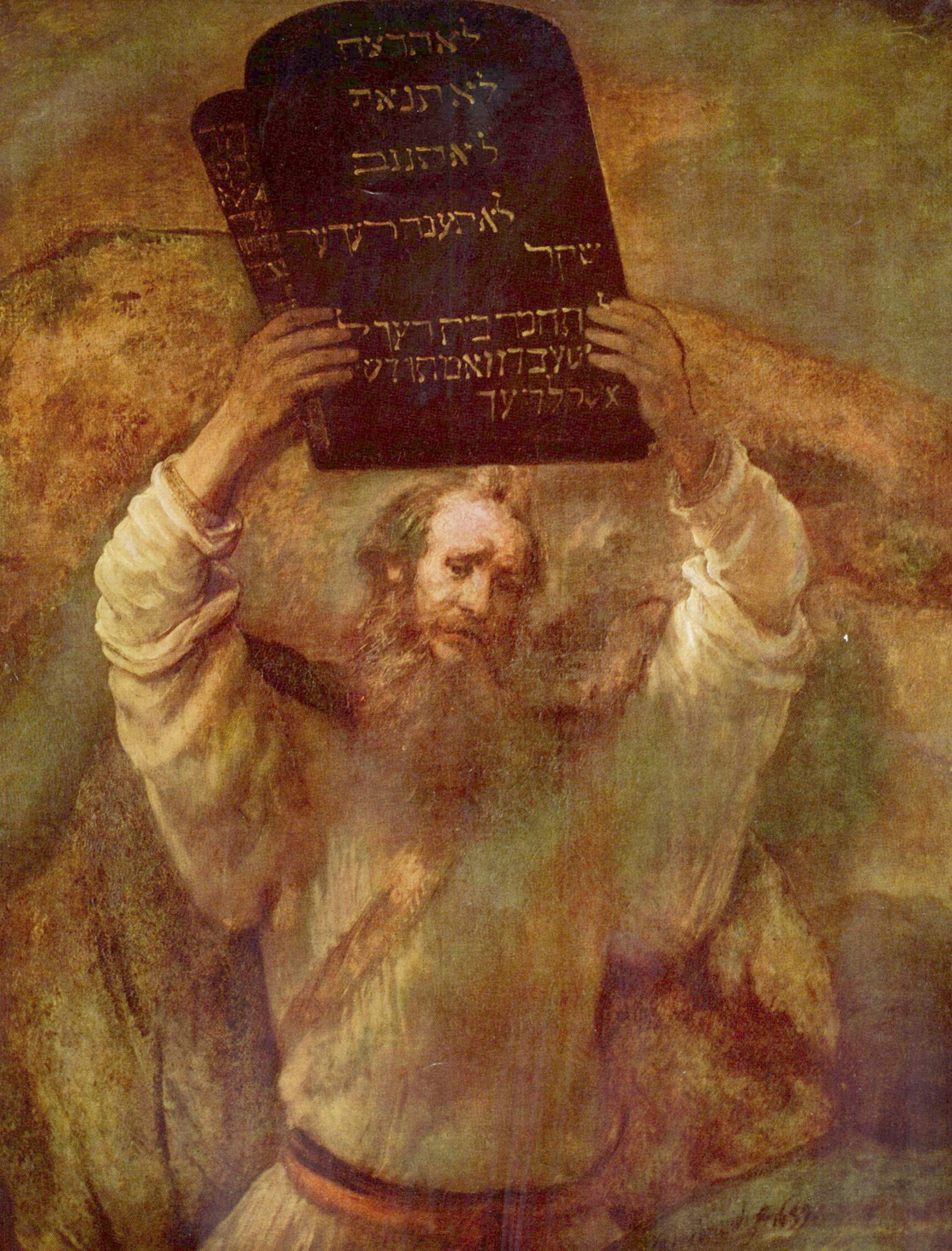
Moses with the Ten Commandments, by Rembrandt.

The term "Semitic" is due to the legendary derivation of the peoples so called from Shem, son of Noah (Genesis 10:1). Hebreaic and Arabian peoples are generally classified as Semitic, a racialist concept derived from Biblical accounts of the origins of the cultures known to the ancient Hebrews. Those closest to them in culture and language were generally deemed to be descended from their forefather Shem, one of the sons of Noah. Enemies were often said to be descendants of his cursed nephew Canaan, grandson of Noah, son of Ham. Modern historians confirm the affinity of ancient Hebrews and Arabs based on characteristics that are usually transmitted from parent to child, such as genes and habits, with the most well-studied criterion being language. Similarities between Semitic languages (including Hebrew and Arabic) and their differences with those spoken by other adjacent people confirm the common origin of Hebrews and Arabs among other Semitic nations.

Around the 12th century BC, Judaism developed as a monotheistic religion. According to Jewish religious tradition, the history of Judaism begins with the Covenant between God and Abraham, who is considered a Hebrew. (The first Hebrew being Eber, a forefather of Abraham.) The Hebrew Bible occasionally refers to Arvi peoples (or variants thereof), translated as "Arab" or "Arabian" deriving from "Arava" plain, the dwellers of plains. Some Arabs of the Arabian Peninsula are considered descendants of Ismael, the first son of Abraham. While the commonly held view among historians is that Islam originated in Arabia in the 7th century AD, in Islam's view, Adam was the first Muslim (in the sense of believing in Allah and surrendering to Allah's commands). Islam also shares many traits with Judaism (as well as with Christianity), like the belief in and reverence for common prophets, such as Moses and Abraham, who are recognized in all three Abrahamic religions.

=== Abraham ===
Judaism and Islam are known as "Abrahamic religions". The first Abrahamic religion was Judaism as practiced in the wilderness of the Sinai peninsula subsequent to the Exodus of the Hebrews from Egypt and continuing as the Hebrews entered the land of Canaan to conquer and settle it. The kingdom eventually split into the kingdoms of Israel and Judah prior to the Babylonian Exile, at the beginning of the 1st millennium AD. The firstborn son of Abraham, Ishmael, is considered by Muslims to be the Father of the Arabs. Abraham's second son Isaac is called Father of the Hebrews. In Islamic tradition Isaac is viewed as the grandfather of all Israelites and the promised son of Ibraham from his barren wife Sarah. In the Hadith, Muhammad says that some twenty five thousand prophets and messengers came from Abraham's seed, most of these being from Isaac, and that the last one in this line was Jesus. In the Jewish tradition Abraham is called Avraham Avinu or "Our Father Abraham". For Muslims, he is considered an important prophet of Islam (see Ibrahim) and the ancestor of Muhammad through Ishmael. Ibrahim is regarded as one of the prophets of Islam alongside Noah, Moses, Jesus, and Muhammad, among others. The narrative of his life in the Quran is similar to that seen in the Tanakh.

=== Moses ===
As in Judaism and Christianity, Moses is regarded in Islam as one of the most prominent prophets. His story is frequently recounted in both the Meccan and Medinan chapters, some of which are long. Although there are differences in the Quranic and Biblical accounts, the remaining narratives are similar. They agree on the events of Moses' infancy, exile to Midian, plagues and miracles, deliverage of the Israelites, parting of the Red Sea, the revelation of the tablets, the incident of the Golden Calf and the 40 years of wandering.

According to Noegel and Wheeler some scholars think there is a parallel between the status of Aaron in Moses' narrative and Umar in the narrative of Muhammad. In both the Biblical and Quranic accounts, Moses is accompanied by Aaron. In both accounts Moses is portrayed more actively. The Quranic and Biblical accounts differ on the nus of responsibility for the Golden Calf incident. The Bible accuses Aaron, whereas the Quranic narrative defends him.

=== Muhammad ===
In the course of Muhammad's proselytizing in Mecca, he initially viewed Christians and Jews (both of whom he referred to as "People of the Book") as natural allies, sharing the core principles of his teachings, and anticipated their acceptance and support. Ten years after his first revelation in Mount Hira, a delegation consisting of the representatives of the twelve important clans of Medina pledged to physically protect Muhammad and invited him as a neutral outsider to Medina to serve as chief arbitrator for the entire community, which had been fighting with each other for around a hundred years and was in need of an authority.

Among the things Muhammad did in order to settle the longstanding grievances among the tribes of Medina was drafting a document known as the Constitution of Medina. The community defined in the Constitution of Medina had a religious outlook but was also shaped by the practical considerations and substantially preserved the legal forms of the old Arab tribes. Muhammad also adopted some features of the Jewish worship and customs such as fasting on the Yom Kippur day. According to Alford Welch, the Jewish practice of having three daily prayer rituals appears to have been a factor in the introduction of the Islamic midday prayer, but Muhammad's adoption of facing north toward Jerusalem, Islam's first Qiblah or direction of prayer (later changed to facing toward the Kabah in Mecca), when performing the daily prayers, was practiced among other groups in Arabia.

Many Medinans converted to the faith of the Meccan immigrants, particularly pagan and polytheist tribes, but there were fewer Jewish converts. The Jews rejected Muhammad's claim to prophethood, and further argued that some passages in the Qur'an contradicted the Torah. Their opposition was due to political as well as religious reasons, as many Jews in Medina had close links with Abd-Allah ibn Ubayy, who was partial to the Jews and would have been Medina's prince if not for Muhammad's arrival.

Mark Cohen adds that Muhammad appeared "centuries after the cessation of biblical prophecy" and "couched his message in a verbiage foreign to Judaism both in its format and rhetoric." Maimonides, a Jewish scholar, referred to Muhammad as a false prophet. Moreover, Maimonides asserted that Muhammad's claim to prophethood was in itself what disqualified him, because it contradicted the prophecy of Moses, the Torah and the Oral Tradition. His argument further asserted that Muhammad being illiterate also disqualified him from being a prophet.

In the Constitution of Medina, Jews were given equality to Muslims in exchange for political loyalty and were allowed to practice their own culture and religion. A significant narrative symbolising the inter-faith harmony between early Muslims and Jews is that of the Rabbi Mukhayriq. The Rabbi was from Banu Nadir and fought alongside Muslims at the Battle of Uhud and bequeathed his entire wealth to Muhammad in the case of his death. He was subsequently called "the best of the Jews" by Muhammad. Later, as Muhammad encountered opposition from the Jews, Muslims began to adopt a more negative view on the Jews, seeing them as something of a fifth column. Jewish violations of the Constitution of Medina, by aiding the enemies of the community, finally brought on major battles of Badr and Uhud which resulted in Muslim victories and the exile of the Banu Qainuqa and Banu Nadir, two of the main three Jewish tribes from Medina, and the mass slaughtering of all male adults of Banu Qurayza.

=== Other prophets ===
Both Judaism and Islam regard many people as being prophets, with exceptions. Both teach that Eber, Job, and Joseph were prophets. However, according to one sage in Judaism the whole story attributed to Job was an allegory and Job never actually existed. Rashi, a Jewish commentator on the Hebrew Scriptures, quotes a text dating to 160 AD, which is also quoted in the Talmud, in his commentary on Genesis 10 to show that Eber was a prophet.

== Historical interaction ==
Jews have often lived in predominantly Islamic nations. Since many national borders have changed over the fourteen centuries of Islamic history, a single community, such as the Jewish community in Cairo, may have been contained in a number of different nations over different periods.

=== Middle Ages ===
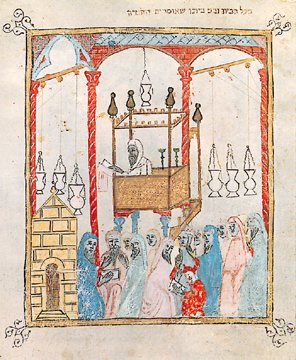
Image of a cantor reading the Passover story in Al Andalus, from the 14th century Haggadah of Barcelona.

In the Iberian Peninsula, under Muslim rule, Jews were able to make great advances in mathematics, astronomy, philosophy, chemistry and philology. This era is sometimes referred to as the Golden age of Jewish culture in the Iberian Peninsula.

Traditionally Jews living in Muslim lands, known (along with Christians) as dhimmis, were allowed to practice their religion and to administer their internal affairs but subject to certain conditions. They had to pay the jizya (a per capita tax imposed on free, adult non-Muslim males) to the Muslim government but were exempted from paying the zakat (a tax imposed on free, adult Muslim males). Dhimmis were prohibited from bearing arms or giving testimony in most Muslim court cases, for there were many Sharia laws which did not apply to Dhimmis, who practiced Halakha. A common misconception is that of the requirement of distinctive clothing, which is a law not taught by the Qur'an or hadith but allegedly invented by the Abbasid Caliphate in early medieval Baghdad. Jews rarely faced martyrdom or exile, or forced compulsion to change their religion, and they were mostly free in their choice of residence and profession. They did, however, have certain restrictions placed upon them, listed in the Pact of Umar. The Pact of Umar was a set of guidelines placed upon Jews in Islamic territories, many of them being very restrictive and prohibitive. However, compared to Jews of Western Christendom at the time, Jews under Islamic rule were generally treated with more compassion and understanding, rather than violence and abhorrence. This period of relative tolerance, political advancement and cultural peacefulness is a time that is referred to as a golden age. As Jews advanced the social ladder, they also gained economic status and power. Many Jews had their own businesses and were even ranking officials within the government. However, Jews still experienced tense and violent times – they were often discriminated against and, as a result, were often the recipient of many violent acts placed upon them. The notable examples of massacre of Jews include the killing or forcible conversion of them by the rulers of the Almohad dynasty in Al-Andalus in the 12th century. Notable examples of the cases where the choice of residence was taken away from them includes confining Jews to walled quarters (mellahs) in Morocco beginning from the 15th century and especially since the early 19th century. Most conversions were voluntary and happened for various reasons. However, there were some forced conversions in the 12th century under the Almohad dynasty of North Africa and al-Andalus as well as in Persia.

The medieval Volga state of Khazaria converted to Judaism, whereas its subject Volga Bulgaria converted to Islam.

=== Conversion of Jews to Islam ===
According to Judaism, Jews that voluntarily convert to Islam commit a treacherous act of heresy in abandoning the Torah. There is a view, held by the Radvaz and Ritva, that a Jew should be prepared to take his own life rather than convert to another religion, but the Rambam, also known as Maimonides, expresses that it is not necessary that a Jew take his own life if he is forced to convert but privately follows the Torah.

Islam accepts converts, and spreading Dawah to other religious adherents including Jews.

In modern times, some notable converts to Islam from a Jewish background include Muhammad Asad (b. Leopold Weiss), Abdallah Schleifer (b. Marc Schleifer), Youssef Darwish, Layla Morad and Maryam Jameelah (b. Margret Marcus). More than 200 Israeli Jews converted to Islam between 2000 and 2008. Historically, in accordance with traditional Islamic law, Jews generally enjoyed freedom of religion in Islamic states as People of the Book. However, certain rulers did historically enact forced conversions for political reasons and religious reasons in regards to youth and orphans. A number of groups who converted from Judaism to Islam have remained Muslim, while maintaining a connection to and interest in their Jewish heritage. These groups include the anusim or Daggataun of Timbuktu who converted in 1492, when Askia Muhammed came to power in Timbuktu and decreed that Jews must convert to Islam or leave, and the Chala, a portion of the Bukharan Jewish community who were pressured and many times forced to convert to Islam.

In Persia, during the Safavid dynasty of the 16th and 17th centuries, Jews were forced to proclaim publicly that they had converted to Islam, and were given the name Jadid-al-Islam (New Muslims). In 1661, an Islamic edict was issued overturning these forced conversions, and the Jews returned to practicing Judaism openly. Jews in Yemen also had to face oppression, during which persecution reached its climax in the 17th century when nearly all Jewish communities in Yemen were given the choice of either converting to Islam or of being banished to a remote desert area, and which later became known as the Mawza Exile. Similarly, to end a pogrom in 1839, the Jews of Mashhad were forced to convert en masse to Islam. They practiced Judaism secretly for over a century before openly returning to their faith. At the turn of the 21st century, around 10,000 lived in Israel, another 4,000 in New York City, and 1,000 elsewhere. (See Allahdad incident.)

In Turkey, the claimed messiah Sabbatai Zevi was forced to convert to Islam in 1668. Most of his followers abandoned him, but several thousand converted to Islam as well, while continuing to see themselves as Jews. They became known as the Dönmeh (a Turkish word for a religious convert). Some Dönmeh remain today, primarily in Turkey.

=== Conversion of Muslims to Judaism ===
Judaism does not proselytize, and often discourages conversion to Judaism; maintaining that all people have a covenant with God, and instead encourages non-Jews to uphold the Seven Laws which it believes were given to Noah. Conversions to Judaism are therefore relatively rare, including those from the Islamic world. One famous Muslim who converted to Judaism was Ovadyah, famous from his contact with Maimonides. Reza Jabari, an Iranian flight attendant who hijacked the air carrier Kish Air flight 707 between Tehran and the resort of Kish Island in September 1995, and landed in Israel converted to Judaism after serving four-and-a-half years in an Israeli prison. He settled among Iranian Jews in the Israeli Red Sea resort town of Eilat. Another such case includes Avraham Sinai, a former Hezbollah fighter who, after the Israel–Lebanon War ended, fled to Israel and converted from Islam to become a religious and practicing Jew.

=== Contemporary era ===
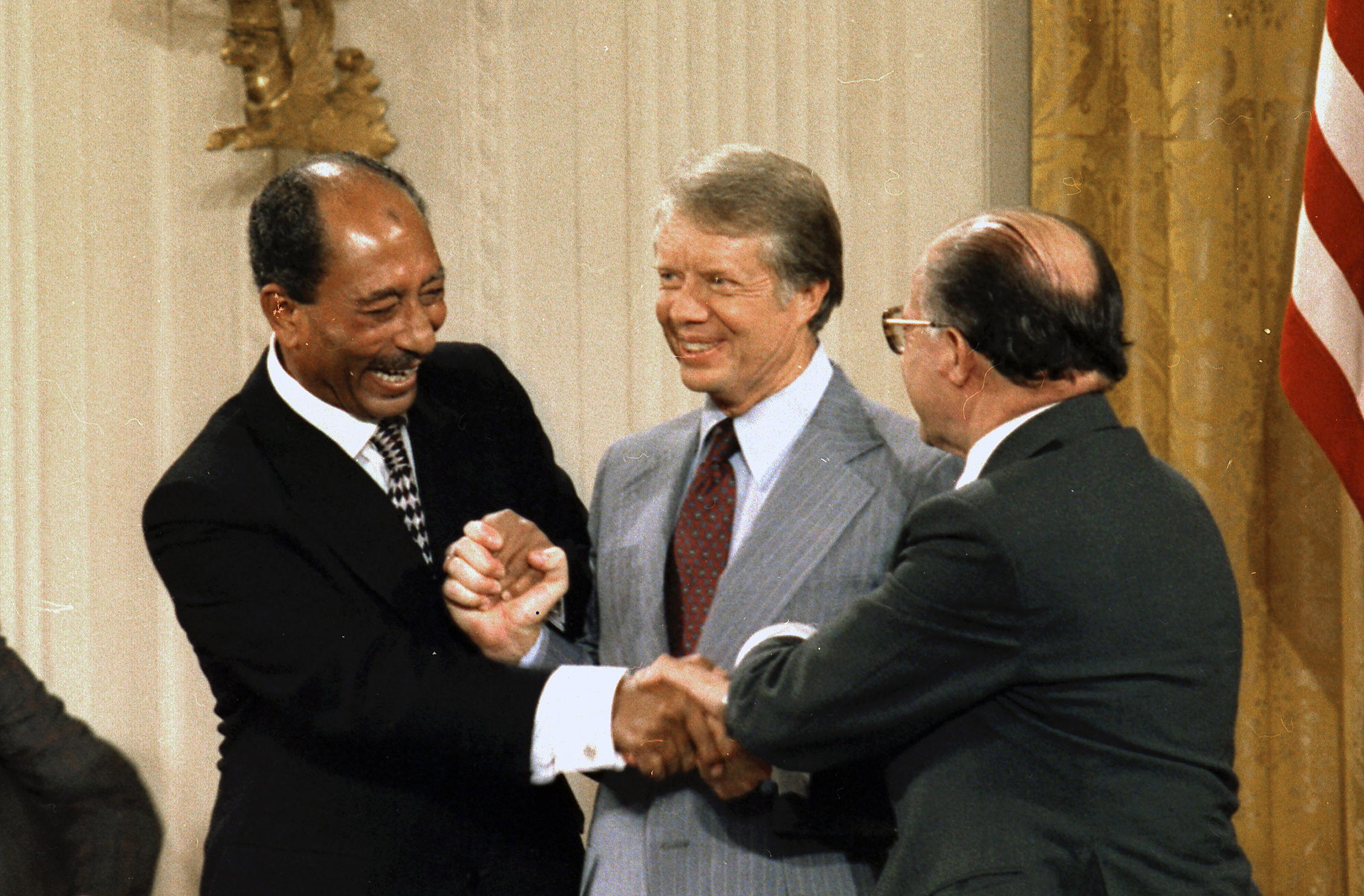
The Camp David Accords, ratified by Israel and Egypt in September 1978, were a vital step forward in improving ties between Jews and Arab Muslims by making a breakthrough towards a resolution of the Arab–Israeli conflict. From left to right: Egyptian president Anwar Sadat, American president Jimmy Carter, and Israeli prime minister Menachem Begin.

Iran contains the largest number of Jews within predominantly Muslim countries and Uzbekistan and Turkey have the next largest communities. Iran's Jewish community is officially recognized as a religious minority group by the government, and, like the Zoroastrians, they were allocated a seat in the Iranian parliament. In 2000, it was estimated that at that time there were still 30,000–35,000 Jews in Iran; other sources put the figure as low as 20,000–25,000. They cannot emigrate out of Iran, since the government only allows one family member to leave and be out of the country at a time. A Jewish businessman was hanged for helping Jews emigrate.

In present times, the Arab–Israeli conflict is a defining event in the relationship between Muslims and Jews. The State of Israel was proclaimed on 14 May 1948, one day before the expiry of the British Mandate of Palestine. Not long after, five Arab countries—Egypt, Syria, Jordan, Lebanon and Iraq—attacked Israel, launching the 1948 Arab–Israeli War. After almost a year of fighting, a ceasefire was declared and temporary borders, known as the Green Line, were instituted. Jordan annexed what became known as the West Bank and Egypt took control of the Gaza Strip. Israel was admitted as a member of the United Nations on 11 May 1949. During the course of the hostilities, 711,000 Arabs, according to UN estimates, fled or were expelled. The following decades saw a similar Jewish exodus from Arab and Muslim countries where 800,000–1,000,000 Jews were forcibly expelled or fled from Arab nations due to persecution.

==== Interfaith activities ====
The Slovenian philosopher Slavoj Žižek has argued that the term Judeo-Muslim to describe the middle-east culture against the western Christian culture would be more appropriate in these days, claiming as well a reduced influence from the Jewish culture on the western world due to the historical persecution and exclusion of the Jewish minority. (Though there is also a different perspective on Jewish contributions and influence.)

A Judaeo-Christian-Muslim concept thus refers to the three main monotheistic religions, commonly known as the Abrahamic religions. Formal exchanges between the three religions, modeled on the decades-old Jewish–Christian interfaith dialogue groups, became common in American cities following the 1993 Israeli–Palestinian Oslo accords.

The governments of Jordan and Qatar have been particularly active in fostering dialogue between Muslims and Jews, through conferences and institutes.

Following 9/11, there was a breakdown in interfaith dialogue that included mosques, due to the increased attention to Islamic sermons in American mosques, that revealed "anti-Jewish and anti-Israel outbursts by previously respected Muslim clerics and community leaders."

One of the country's most prominent mosques is the New York Islamic Cultural Center, built with funding from Kuwait, Saudi Arabia, and Malaysia. Its imam, Mohammad Al-Gamei'a, disappeared two days after 9/11.

Back in Egypt, he was interviewed on an Arabic-language Web site, charging that the "Zionist media" had covered up Jewish responsibility for the terrorist attack on the World Trade Center. He agreed with Osama bin Laden's accusations in bin Laden's Letter to America, claiming that Jews were guilty of "disseminating corruption, heresy, homosexuality, alcoholism, and drugs." And he said that Muslims in America were afraid to go to the hospital for fear that some Jewish doctors had "poisoned" Muslim children. "These people murdered the prophets; do you think they will stop spilling our blood? No," he said.

Since 2007, the Foundation for Ethnic Understanding, led by Rabbi Marc Schneier and Russell Simmons has made improving Muslim–Jewish relations their main focus. They have hosted the National Summit of Imams and Rabbis in 2007, the Gathering of Muslim and Jewish Leaders in Brussels in 2010 and in Paris in 2012, and three Missions of Muslim and Jewish Leaders to Washington D.C.. Each November the Foundation hosts the Weekend of Twinning which encourages Muslims and Jews, Imams and Rabbis, Mosques and synagogues, and Muslim and Jewish organizations to hold joint programming inspired by the commonalities between Muslims and Jews.

The interview was published 4 October on a Web site affiliated with Cairo's Al-Azhar University, Islam's most respected theological academy. Immediately after 9/11, Imam Al-Gamei'a had presided over an interfaith service at his mosque. At the service the imam was quoted as saying, "We emphasize the condemnation of all persons, whoever they be, who have carried out this inhuman act." The Reverend James Parks Morton, president of the Interfaith Center of New York, who attended the service, called Imam Al-Gamei'a's subsequent comments "astonishing." "It makes interfaith dialogue all the more important," Reverend Morton said.

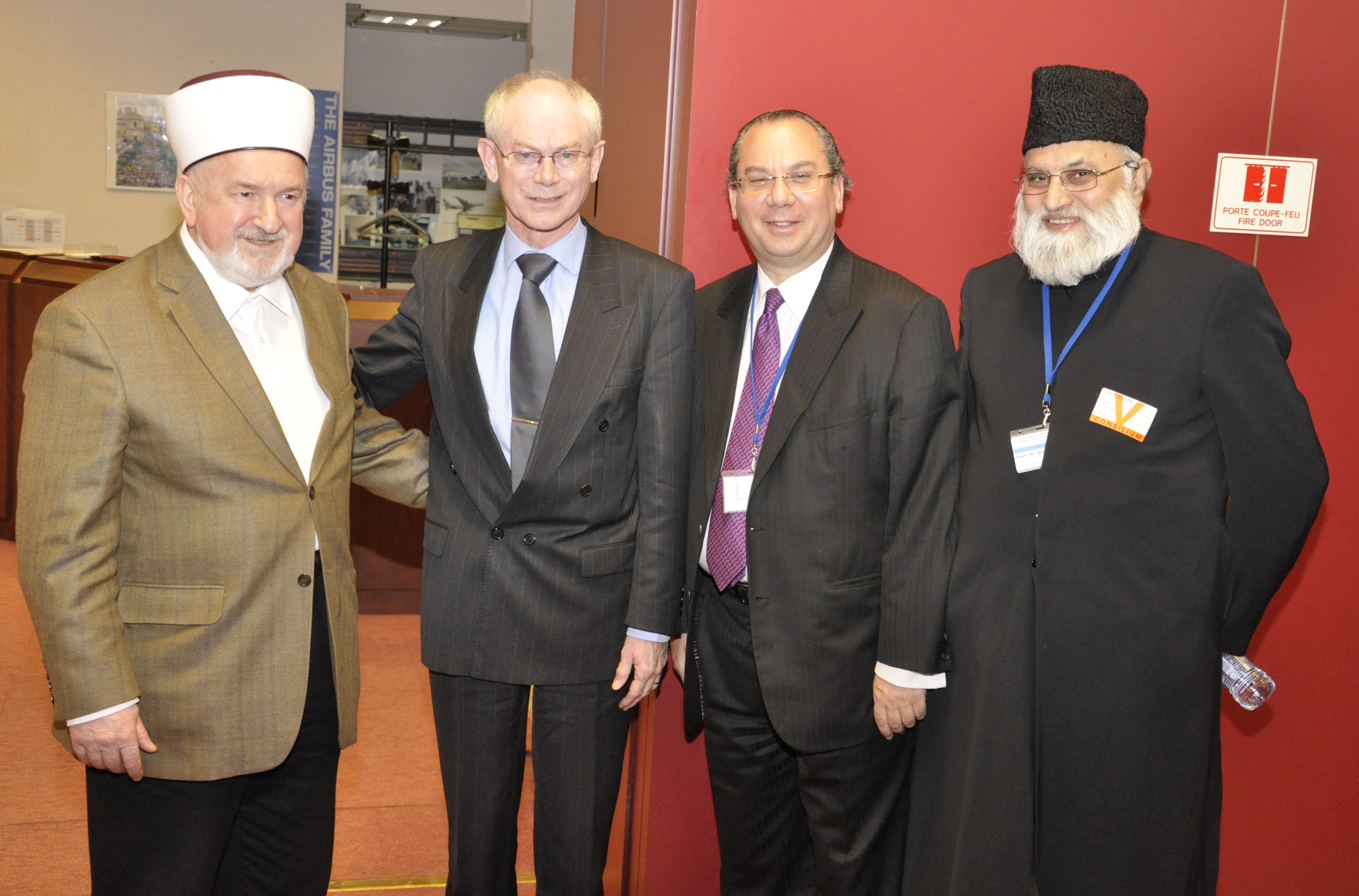
First Gathering of European Muslim and Jewish leaders in Brussels, December 2010 hosted by the Foundation for Ethnic Understanding – left to right: Grand Mufti Mustafa Ceric – European Council President Herman Van Rompuy – Rabbi Marc Schneier – Imam Dr. Abdujalil Sajid

Post 9/11 remarks made by Muslim leaders in Cleveland and Los Angeles also led to the suspension of longstanding Muslim–Jewish dialogues. Some Jewish community leaders cite the statements as the latest evidence that Muslim–Jewish dialogue is futile in today's charged atmosphere. John Rosove, senior rabbi of Temple Israel of Hollywood, and other Jewish participants withdrew from the three-year-old Muslim-Jewish dialogue group after one of the Muslim participants, Salam al-Marayati of MPAC, suggested in a radio interview that Israel should be put on the list of suspects behind the 11 September attacks. However, in January 2011, MPAC member Wa’el Azmeh and Temple Israel engaged in an interfaith dialogue.

In Cleveland, Jewish community leaders put Muslim–Jewish relations on hold after the spiritual leader of a prominent mosque appeared in (a 1991) videotape ...aired after 9/11 by a local TV station. Imam Fawaz Damra calls for "directing all the rifles at the first and last enemy of the Islamic nation and that is the sons of monkeys and pigs, the Jews." The revelation was all the more shocking since Imam Damra had been an active participant in local interfaith activities.

Good Jewish–Muslim relations continue in Detroit, which has the nation's largest Arab-American community. Jewish organizations there have established good relations with a religious group called the Islamic Supreme Council of North America.

In Los Angeles, there has been a formation of an interfaith think tank through the partnership of neighboring institutions the University of Southern California, The Hebrew Union College, and Omar Foundation. The Center for Muslim–Jewish Engagement has an extensive online resource center with scholarly works on similar topics from Muslim and Jewish perspectives. The Center of Muslim–Jewish Engagement has begun to launch an interfaith religious text-study group to build bonds and form a positive community promoting interfaith relations.

== Common aspects ==
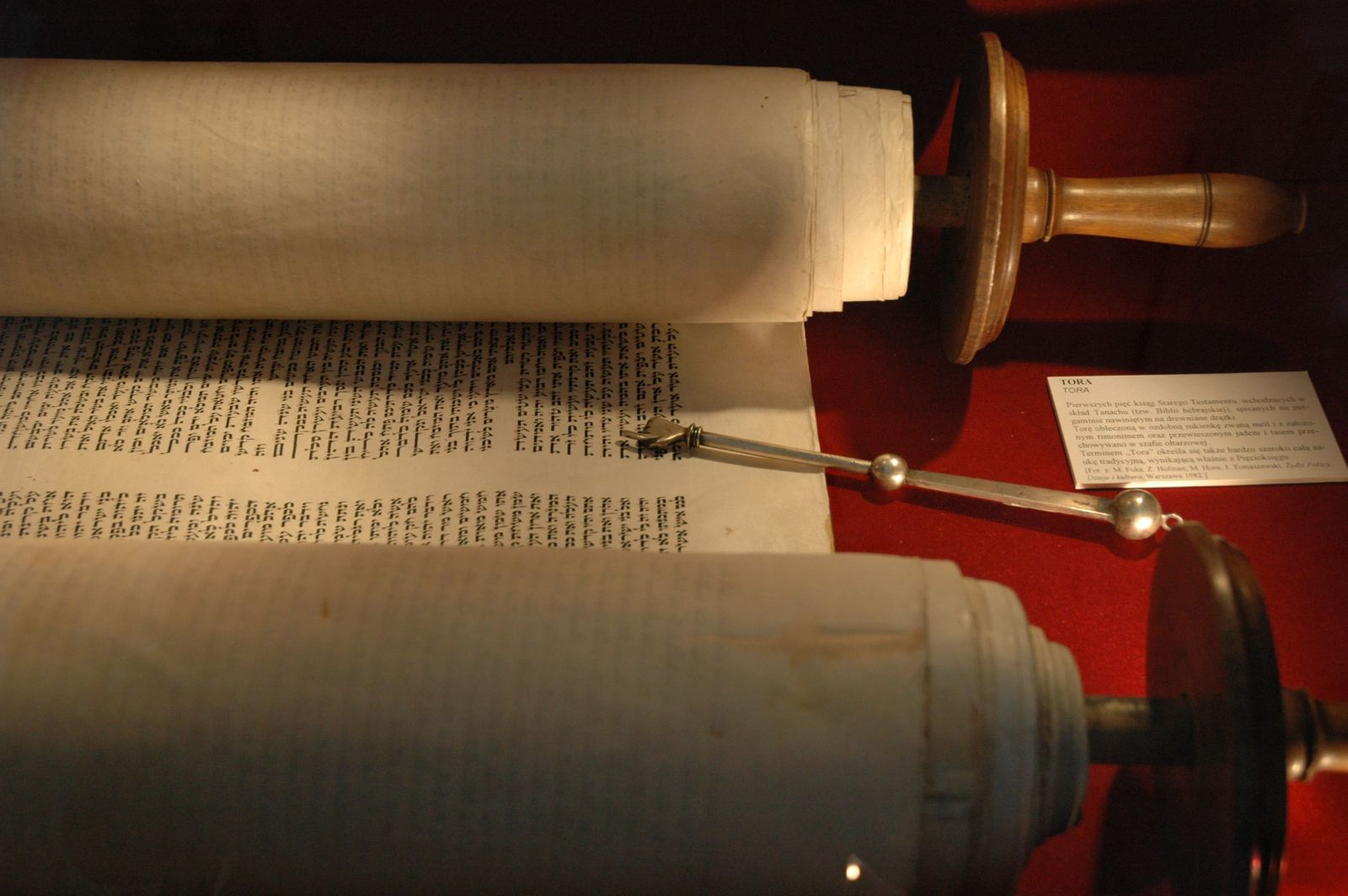
A Sefer Torah opened for liturgical use in a synagogue service

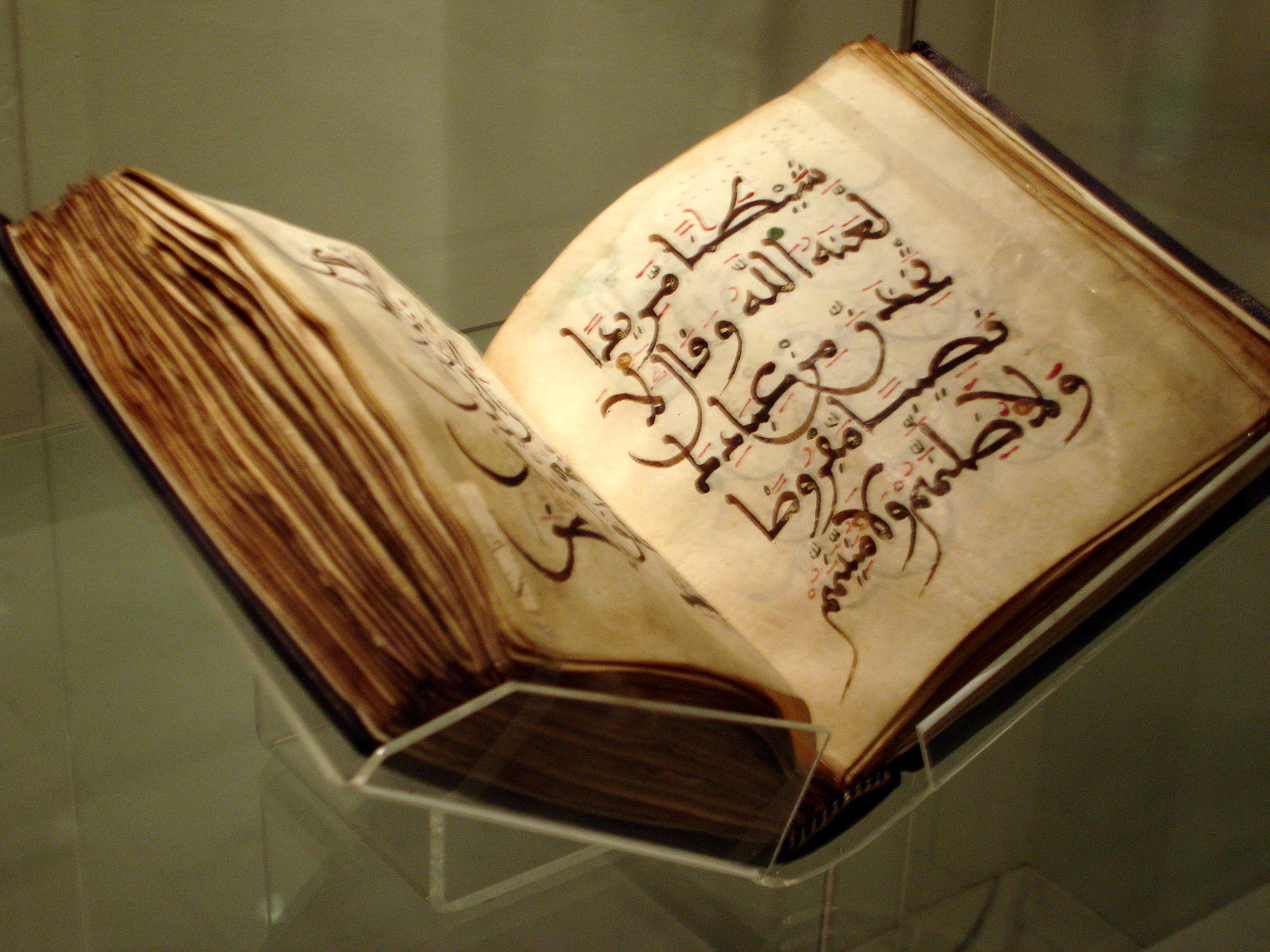
11th-century North African Quran in the British Museum

There are many common aspects between Islam and Judaism. As Islam developed it gradually became the major religion closest to Judaism, both of them being strictly monotheist religious traditions originating in a Semitic Middle Eastern culture. As opposed to Christianity, which originated from interaction between ancient Greek and Hebrew cultures, Islam is similar to Judaism in its fundamental religious outlook, structure, jurisprudence and practice. Because of this, many Jewish scholars like Maimonides viewed Islam as non-idolatrous (and therefore permitted to be practiced by non-Jews), albeit other Jewish scholars considered Islam a form of idolatry for various reasons.

There are many traditions within Islam originating from traditions within the Hebrew Bible or from postbiblical Jewish traditions. These practices are known collectively as the Isra'iliyat.

=== Holy scripture ===
Islam and Judaism share the idea of a revealed scripture. Even though they differ over the precise text and its interpretations, the Hebrew Torah and the Muslim Qur'an share a lot of similar narratives as well as injunctions. From this, they share many other fundamental religious concepts such as the belief in a day of Divine Judgment. Reflecting the vintage of the religions, the Torah is traditionally in the form of a scroll and the Qur'an in the form of a codex.

Muslims commonly refer to Jews (and Christians) as fellow "People of the Book": people who follow the same general teachings in relation to the worship of the one God worshipped by Abraham. The Qur'an distinguishes between "People of the Book" (Jews and Christians), who should be tolerated even if they hold to their faiths, and idolaters (polytheists) who are not given that same degree of tolerance (See Al-Baqara, 256). Some restrictions for Muslims are relaxed, such as Muslim males being allowed to marry a woman from the "People of the Book", or Muslims being allowed to eat Kosher meat.

The Quranic account and Islamic sources explain that the Torah has undergone extensive corruption through textual alteration and contextomy. Various Jewish factions had sparred in the Hasmonean era of who the most notable were the Pharisees and Sadducees. The modern Jewish tradition originates from the Pharisaic school which has dominated Jewish theology since the end of the Second Temple period. The Pharisees and Sadducees had differed over the interpretation of the Biblocal canon. The Sadducees adopted a stricter literal interpretation of the Bible against the Pharisaic stress on the Oral Torah and a non-literal interpretation of the written Torah with the usage of the oral Torah. Such interpretation advanced far beyond the literal interpretations. Later the sages of the Mishnah and Talmud continued with constructing a framework of interpreting the Torah homiletically. This framework was sketched out early in the Talmud and this framework is attributed to R.Hillel, R.Ishmael b. Elisha and R. Eli'ezer b.R. Yossey of the Galilee. The Bablylonian Talmud documents seventy incidents where the sages interpreted the Bible by chainging a word or more. This came about by processes such as changing the vocalisation of verbiage, because Hebrew alphabet is consonantal, to suit a particular interpretation. At other times Talmudic sages would split words into two. With this evidence, Mazuz points out that the Quranic charge of the Torah's corruption was not misleading but was a rejection of the homiletic methodology in the Talmud.

=== Rules of conduct ===
The most obvious common practice is the statement of the absolute unity of God, which Muslims observe in their five times daily prayers (salat), and Jews state at least twice (Shema Yisrael), along with praying 3 times daily. The two faiths also share the central practices of fasting (see Yom Kippur and Ramadan) and almsgiving, as well as dietary laws and other aspects of ritual purity. Under the strict dietary laws, lawful food is called Kosher in Judaism and Halal in Islam. Both religions prohibit the consumption of pork. Halal restrictions are similar to a subset of the Kashrut dietary laws, so all kosher foods are considered halal, while not all halal foods are Kosher. Halal laws, for instance, do not prohibit the mixing of milk and meat or the consumption of shellfish, each of which are prohibited by the kosher laws, with the exception that in the Shia Islam belief shellfish, mussels, and similar sea foods and fish without scales are not considered halal.

Sacred texts of both religions ban homosexuality and forbid human sexual relations outside of marriage and necessitate abstinence during the wife's menstruation. Both Islam and Judaism practice circumcision of males. (Khitan for Muslims and Brit milah for Jews)

=== Other similarities ===
Islam and Judaism both consider the Christian doctrine of the trinity and the belief of Jesus being God as explicitly against the tenets of monotheism. Idolatry and the worship of graven images is likewise forbidden in both religions. Both have calendars and Sabbaths (the Hebrew calendar and Shabbat for Jews; the Islamic calendar and Friday prayer for Muslims). Both have official colors (Blue in Judaism and Green in Islam). Both faiths believe in angels, as servants of God and share a similar idea of demons (Jinn and Shedim); Jewish demonology mentions ha-Satan and Muslim demonology mentions Al-Shai'tan both rejecting him as an opponent of God. Many angels also possess similar names and roles in both Judaism and Islam. Neither religion subscribes to the concept of original sin and both religions traditionally view homosexuality as sinful. Narrative similarities between Jewish texts and the Hadith have also been noted. For example, both state that Potiphar's wife was named Zuleika.

There is a small bone in the body at the base of the spinal column called the Luz bone (known by differing traditions as either the coccyx or the seventh cervical vertebra) from which the body will be rebuilt at the time of resurrection, according to Muslims and Jews who share the belief that this bone does not decay. Muslim books refer to this bone as "^Ajbu al-Thanab" (عَجْبُ الذَّنَب). Rabbi Joshua Ben Hananiah replied to Hadrian, as to how man revived in the world to come, "From Luz, in the back-bone".

The Islamic Hadith and Jewish Talmud have also often been compared as authoritative extracanonical texts that were originally oral transmissions for generations before being committed to writing.

== Interplay between Jewish and Islamic thought ==
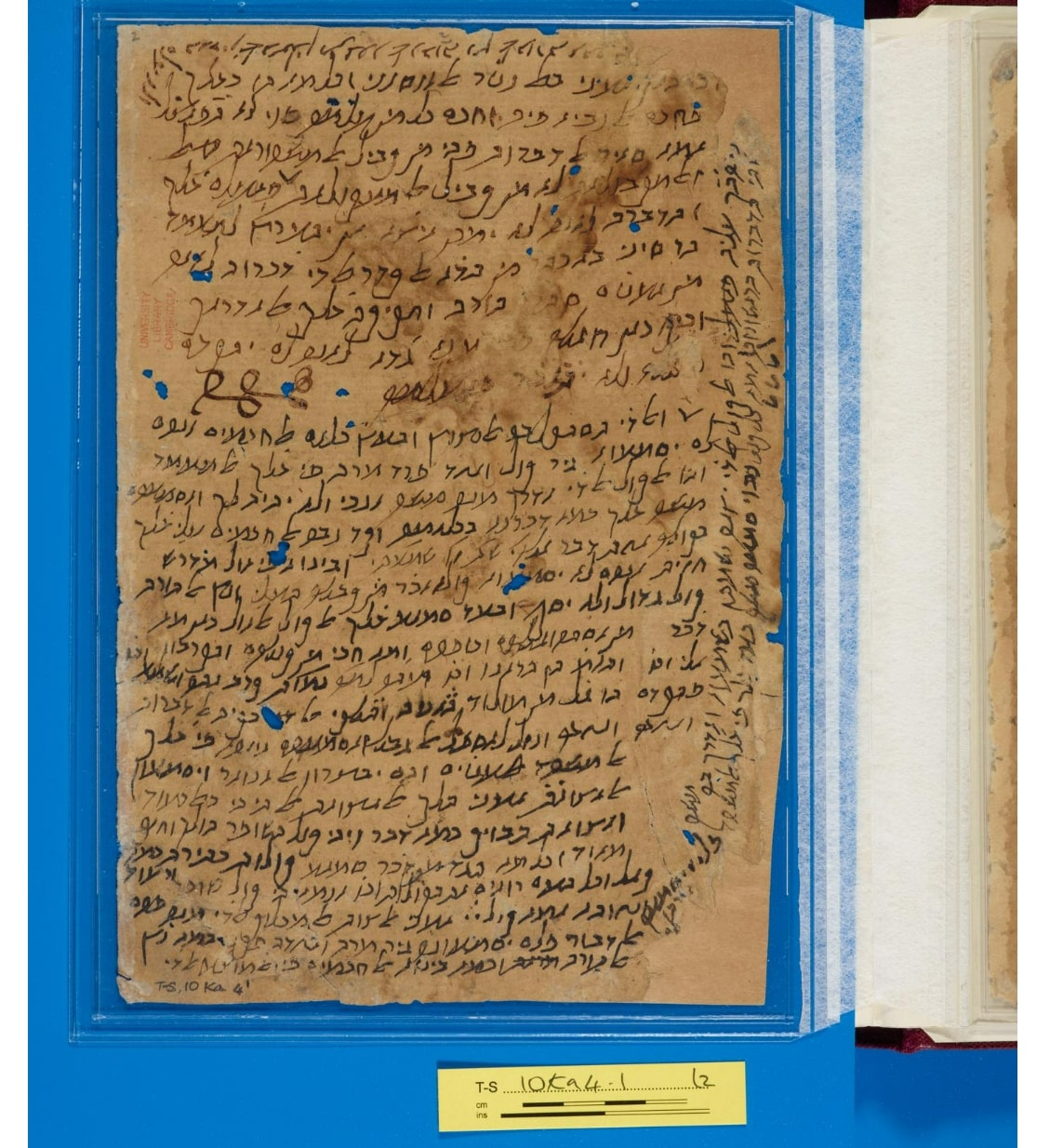
Manuscript page in Arabic written in the Hebrew alphabet by Maimonides (12th century).

=== Saadia Gaon ===
One of the most important early Jewish philosophers influenced by Islamic philosophy is Rav Saadia Gaon (892–942). His most important work is Emunoth ve-Deoth ("Book of Beliefs and Opinions"). In this work Saadia treats of the questions that interested the Mutakallimun so deeply—such as the creation of matter, the unity of God, the divine attributes, the soul, etc.—and he criticizes the philosophers severely.

The 12th century saw the apotheosis of pure philosophy. This supreme exaltation of philosophy was due, in great measure, to Ghazali (1058–1111) among the Arabs, and to Judah ha-Levi (1140) among the Jews. Like Ghazali, Judah ha-Levi took upon himself to free religion from the shackles of speculative philosophy, and to this end wrote the Kuzari, in which he sought to discredit all schools of philosophy alike.

=== Maimonides ===
Maimonides endeavored to harmonize the philosophy of Aristotle with Judaism; and to this end he composed the work, Dalalat al-Ḥairin (Guide for the Perplexed)—known better under its Hebrew title Moreh Nevuchim—which served for many centuries as the subject of discussion and comment by Jewish thinkers. In this work, Maimonides considers creation, the unity of God, the attributes of God, the soul, etc., and treats them in accordance with the theories of Aristotle to the extent in which these latter do not conflict with religion. For example, while accepting the teachings of Aristotle upon matter and form, he pronounces against the eternity of matter. Nor does he accept Aristotle's theory that God can have a knowledge of universals only, and not of particulars. If He had no knowledge of particulars, He would be subject to constant change. Maimonides argues: "God perceives future events before they happen, and this perception never fails Him. Therefore there are no new ideas to present themselves to Him. He knows that such and such an individual does not yet exist, but that he will be born at such a time, exist for such a period, and then return into non-existence. When then this individual comes into being, God does not learn any new fact; nothing has happened that He knew not of, for He knew this individual, such as he is now, before his birth" (Moreh, i.20). While seeking thus to avoid the troublesome consequences certain Aristotelian theories would entail upon religion, Maimonides could not altogether escape those involved in Aristotle's idea of the unity of souls; and herein he laid himself open to the attacks of the orthodox.

A series of eminent men—such as the Tibbons, Narboni, and Gersonides—joined in translating the Arabic philosophical works into Hebrew and commenting upon them. The works of Ibn Roshd especially became the subject of their study, due in great measure to Maimonides, who, in a letter addressed to his pupil Joseph ben Judah, spoke in the highest terms of Ibn Roshd's commentary.

In a response, Maimonides discusses the relationship between Judaism and Islam:

The Ishmaelites are not at all idolaters; [idolatry] has long been severed from their mouths and hearts; and they attribute to God a proper unity, a unity concerning which there is no doubt. And because they lie about us, and falsely attribute to us the statement that God has a son, is no reason for us to lie about them and say that they are idolaters ... And should anyone say that the house that they honor [the Kaaba] is a house of idolatry and an idol is hidden within it, which their ancestors used to worship, then what of it? The hearts of those who bow down toward it today are [directed] only toward Heaven ... [Regarding] the Ishmaelites today—idolatry has been severed from the mouths of all of them [including] women and children. Their error and foolishness is in other things which cannot be put into writing because of the renegades and wicked among Israel [i.e., apostates]. But as regards the unity of God they have no error at all.

=== Influence on exegesis ===
Saadia Gaon's commentary on the Bible bears the stamp of the Mutazilites; and its author, while not admitting any positive attributes of God, except these of essence, endeavors to interpret Biblical passages in such a way as to rid them of anthropomorphism. The Jewish commentator, Abraham ibn Ezra, explains the Biblical account of Creation and other Scriptural passages in a philosophical sense. Nahmanides (Rabbi Moshe ben Nahman), too, and other commentators, show the influence of the philosophical ideas current in their respective epochs. This salutary inspiration, which lasted for five consecutive centuries, yielded to that other influence alone that came from the neglected depths of Jewish and of Neoplatonic mysticism, and which took the name of Kabbalah.

== Muslim–Jewish wars and military conflicts ==
In the early days of Islam, according to Islamic sources, a Jewish tribe of Arabia (see Banu Qurayza) was alleged to have broken the peace treaty with the early Muslims, resulting in the execution of over 700 Jews. The children and women were subsequently taken by Muslim soldiers; one of these, Safiyya bint Huyayy whose husband Kenana ibn al-Rabi had also been killed, was taken by Muhammad as his wife. There were notable persecutions of Jews such as the 1033 Fez massacre, 1066 Granada massacre and 1834 looting of Safed. In the late 19th century, the Zionist movement sought to re-establish a Jewish homeland in historic Israel, within the historical territory of Palestine, also known as Zion, also known as the Holy Land. This created tensions between the Palestinian Jews and Palestinian Arabs, leading to, beginning in 1947, a civil war and the subsequent exodus of many Palestinian Arabs and many Jews from Muslim countries. In 1948, the state of Israel was declared, and shortly after its declaration of independence, the Arab States declared war on Israel, in which the Israelis were victorious. After the 1948 Arab–Israeli War, twelve more wars were fought between the Arab States and Israel. The Arab–Israeli conflict has weakened Islamic–Jewish relations severely.

== See also ==
- Israʼiliyyat, Judaism-induced concepts and traditions in Islam
- List of converts to Islam
- List of converts to Judaism#From Islam

=== History ===
- History of Islam
- History of Judaism
- History of the Jews under Muslim rule
  - Arab Jews (Jewish tribes of Arabia)
  - Iraqi Jews
  - Jews in Al-Andalus
  - Kurdish Jews
  - Ottoman Jews
  - Persian Jews
  - Yemenite Jews

=== Culture ===
- Arab Jews
- Arabs
- Bukharian Jews
- Center for Muslim–Jewish Engagement
- The Hebrews
- Joint Jewish and Islamic philosophies
- Mizrahi Jews
- People of the Book
- Semitic peoples
- Sephardi Jews
- Shia Muslims
- Sunni Muslims

=== Issues ===
- Arab–Israeli conflict
- Islam and antisemitism
- Jewish views on Muhammad
- Muhammad's views on Jews
- Muslim Zionism
- Persecution of Jews
- Projects working for peace among Israelis and Arabs
- Uzair

=== Comparative religion ===
- Christianity and Islam
- Christianity and Judaism
- Comparative religion
