= Jacob ben Nathanael =

Jacob ben Nathanael ibn al-Fayyumi (Hebrew: יעקב בן נתנאל אבן אלפיומי) was a rosh yeshiva of the Yemenite Jews in the second half of the 12th century CE, son of the illustrious Rabbi, Nathanel al-Fayyumi. All that is known of him is that at the suggestion of Solomon ha-Kohen, a pupil of Maimonides, he wrote to the latter asking his advice in regard to a pseudo-Messiah who was leading the Jews of southern Arabia astray. From a passage in Maimonides' "Letter to the Wise Men of the Congregation of Marseilles", the date of Jacob's letter is fixed as 1172 (Halub, in his ed. of Iggeret Teman, p. 51, note). In answer, Maimonides sent his Iggeret Teman or, as it is also called, Petah Tikva. Abraham Harkavy supposes that Jacob had knowledge of Saadia Gaon's Sefer ha-Galui (Studien und Mittheil. v.154; comp. Monatsschrift, xliv.508). Jacob's father was known as a philosophical writer (see Jew. Encyc. v.354).
