= Center for Muslim-Jewish Engagement =

Interfaith organization

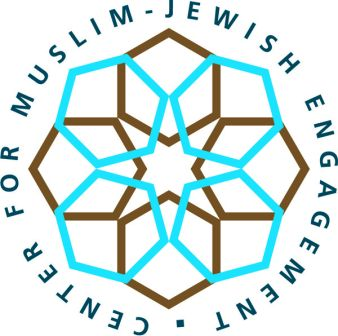
Center for Muslim-Jewish Engagement

The Center for Muslim-Jewish Engagement (CMJE) was a faith-based coalition whose stated mission was to "promote dialogue, understanding and grassroots, congregational and academic partnerships among the oldest and the newest of the Abrahamic faiths while generating a contemporary understanding in this understudied area and creating new tools for interfaith communities locally, nationally and beyond." The center closed in January 2012.

== Mission and history ==
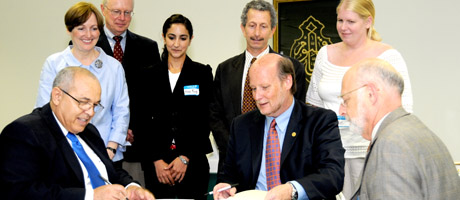
The founding of CMJE

The Center for Muslim-Jewish Engagement (CMJE) was made possible through help from the Righteous Persons Foundation and the relationship between Hebrew Union College-Jewish Institute of Religion (HUC), the Omar Ibn Al Khattab Foundation and USC's Center for Religion and Civic Culture at the College of Letters, Arts, and Sciences. The foresight of USC President Steven B. Sample and his actions of increasing harmony amongst USC and its neighbors was necessary for CMJE's inception. The project began with a friendship between Mr. Dafer Dakhil, Dr. Donald Miller, Ms. Brie Loskota, and Reuven Firestone back in 2002. Since 2005, the quartet has been responsible for holding two international conferences, educating visiting Islamic scholars, hosting programs with collegiate scholars, and creating a pathway for USC, HUC and members of Masjid Omar Ibn Al-Khattab to interact. It was officially created in 2008.

== See also ==
- Islam
- Judaism
- Islam and Judaism
