= Epistle to Yemen =

Letter written by Maimonides

The Epistle to Yemen or Yemen Letter (Arabic: الرسالة اليمنية, translated as Hebrew: אגרת תימן, romanized: Iggeret Teiman) was an important communication written by Maimonides and sent to the Yemenite Jews. The epistle was written in 1173/4. The letter was written in Judeo-Arabic.

The need for the epistle arose due to religious persecution and heresy in 12th-century Yemen. The local community faced simultaneous challenges from a messiah claimant and an anonymous Jewish apostate who preached a syncretistic religion combining Islam and Judaism. This apostate used selective Torah passages to argue that the Bible foretold the coming of Muhammad as a prophet. Haggai Mazuz believes this unnamed apostate was al-Samawal al-Maghribi, author of the Confutation of the Jews (Arabic: افحام اليهود, romanized: Ifḥām al-Yahūd).

One of the leaders of the Yemeni Jewish community, Jacob ben Nathanael—son of the scholar Natan'el al-Fayyumi—had written to Maimonides in Egypt to express his concerns. Jacob questioned whether the influence of the stars was responsible for the ongoing religious persecution and the rise of the false messiah. Maimonides rejected the validity of astrology, advising Jacob to dismiss the idea that constellations determine human fate, and instead counseling the community on practical measures to mitigate the influence of the claimant.

== Background ==
Jews had lived in Yemen for centuries, in communities scattered across the country. In the late 1160s, the Mahdid ruler ʿAbd al-Nabi ibn Mahdi, who controlled most of Yemen, ordered the Jews to convert to Islam. Many did, and the decree caused panic in the community. A man claiming to be the Messiah added to the turmoil, and the community's leader, Jacob ben Nathanael, wrote to Maimonides in Egypt for guidance.

Maimonides answered around 1172, though some scholars place the letter in 1173–1174. He wrote in Judeo-Arabic, and the letter was later translated into Hebrew three contemporary translators: Samuel ibn Tibbon, Nahum Ma'arabi, and Abraham ben Hasdai.

The Mahdid regime fell to the Ayyubids in 1173–1174, when Saladin's brother Turan-Shah conquered Yemen. According to tradition, Maimonides had interceded with Saladin, though exactly how and when is not well documented.

== Epistle's Introduction ==
Maimonides sent the letter from Egypt to Aden in 1173 or 1174. In the introduction, he praises the Yemenite Jews for strictly following Jewish law and their own local custom. He writes that although he has never met Jacob ben Nathanael in person, the community is widely known to him by reputation for its deep religious devotion and high level of education. He composed the original text in a rhyming poetic style in Judeo-Arabic, though this rhyme is lost in the English translation.

=== Excerpt from the Epistle to Yemen ===
In what concerns the [existence of some subterranean] root of truth, its own trunk shall bear witness [of the same]; whereas, in what concerns the goodness of a [hidden] wellspring, its own current shall give testimony [to the same]. For, verily, from the root of truth and righteousness has blossomed a faithful offshoot, and from the wellspring of loving kindness, a large ravine has stretched itself out in the land of Yemen, to water therewith all gardens, [and] to cause the flowering of [all] buds. Behold! It conducts itself in a slow pace, for all who are exhausted and thirsty in the wilderness, and by it have the wayfarers and isles of the sea supplied their want until, at length, they were completely made satisfied thereby! Therefore, they have published in Spain and in Sepharvaim, (Note: Cf. II Kings 18: 34) from one end of the heavens unto the other, [saying], 'Lo! All those that be thirsty, let them go to the waters!' (Note: Isaiah 55:1) And the traders and all the merchants, all of them together, have answered those that inquired of them, [saying] that they have found a bountiful [and] comely orchard, and a good pasture, where anyone who is lean becomes fat, and where their shepherd is a faithful shepherd – [even] those who dwell in the land of Yemen! For they are a refuge for the poor, supplying him with bread, [and are become] the stay for the rich, [even] those who take the first steps to salute him! The traversing caravans of Sheba have put their [hope and] expectation in them, while their hand to all travelers was outstretched. And their home was opened widely [for all], and with them, all [men] have found rest, whilst anguish and sighing fled away! And all day long, they utter the Law of Moses, walking in the way that Rav Ashi instructed. [They are] those who pursue [diligently] after righteousness, and strengthen the places that have fallen; those who establish the principles of the [divine] Law upon their razed places, [and] who gather the dispersed of God's people by their words; who, in their assemblies, perform all of the commandments in a most scrupulous manner! There is no unruly conduct [to be found among them], neither she who departs [from the path], nor [any] crying in their streets. Blessed be God who has brought no end to those who observe the [divine] Law, [even] those who keep [His] precepts in the distant isles! ... Now when your letter reached us in Egypt, our friend [and] our beloved, all ears were pleased to hear it, as was it desirable [also] to the sight. It bore witness before us concerning you, that you are of the servants of the Lord who dwell in His quarter, who are encamped beside His banner, and who are of those who pursue diligently the divine Law, and those who love its commissions, even those who attend fervently at its doors.

== Main themes ==
The Epistle to Yemen addresses the immediate crises facing Yemenite Jewry by combining theological defense, historical analysis, and practical halakhic guidance.

=== The nature of anti-Jewish persecution ===
Maimonides frames the contemporary suffering under the Mahdid regime not as abandonment by God, but as a test of faith (nisayon). He categorizes the historic threats against the Jewish people into three distinct modes:

1. Physical violence: Direct military attempts at destruction (such as Nebuchadnezzar II and Titus).
2. Ideological attack: Philosophical challenges to Jewish scripture and tradition (such as the ancient Greeks).
3. Religious replacement: The creation of daughter religions (specifically Christianity and Islam) that claim to supersede Judaism and divine revelation.

He reassures the community that just as earlier empires and ideological movements collapsed, the contemporary persecutors would ultimately fall as well.

=== Inviolability of the Torah and refutation of Islamic claims ===
Addressing the arguments of the Jewish apostate, Maimonides defends the immutability of the Torah against the Islamic doctrine of abrogation (naskh) and accusations of textual forgery (tahrif). He argues:

- The divine revelation at Mount Sinai was a unique, public, and unrepeatable historical event experienced directly by an entire nation.
- No subsequent prophet can alter or invalidate the laws given through Moses, who held a unique status above all other prophets.
- Claims that biblical verses (such as references to Mount Paran or the word bi-me'od me'od) foretold the prophet Muhammad rely on forced or artificial textual interpretations.

=== Messianism and false prophets ===
To dismantle the influence of the Yemenite messiah claimant, Maimonides outlines strict criteria for the true Messiah, noting that he must display supreme wisdom, achieve restoration of the Davidic kingdom, and fulfill specific prophetic conditions rather than performing mere magic or signs.

He provides a historical review of past false messiahs across the Jewish diaspora (including Bar Kokhba and messianic movements in Spain and Fez), demonstrating that premature or false messianic declarations historically led to disillusionment, political backlash, and severe suffering. Furthermore, he strongly warns against calculating the exact timing of the Messiah's arrival (ketz), noting that failed dates undermine faith.

=== Rejection of astrology ===
In direct response to Jacob ben Nathanael’s query regarding planetary conjunctions, Maimonides firmly repudiates Astrology, classifying it as a superstition distinct from true astronomy. He insists that celestial bodies operate on natural laws and possess no influence over human fate or Israel's divine destiny, urging the community not to view their plight as a pre-ordained astrological decree.

=== Pastoral and practical guidance ===
Maimonides offers concrete, compassionate advice for community members struggling under persecution:

- Forced converts (Anusim): He counsels that individuals forced to convert to Islam under duress remain part of the Jewish fold. He urges them to observe as many commandments in secret as possible, reassuring them that God rewards all faithful efforts, however partial.
- Emigration: He advises that if an individual cannot practice Judaism in secret without constant danger, it is incumbent upon them to leave the region and relocate to a country with religious tolerance, even at great economic sacrifice.

== See also ==
- History of responsa
- Rabbinic literature
- Rishonim
- Letter to the Himyarites
