= Foundation for Ethnic Understanding =

Not-for-profit organization in New York

- Abbreviation: FFEU
- Formation: 1989
- Type: not-for-profit organization
- Headquarters: New York, NY, United States
- President: Marc Schneier
- Revenue: $932,979 (2015)
- Expenses: $1,093,755 (2015)
- Website: www.ffeu.org

The Foundation for Ethnic Understanding (FFEU) is a not-for-profit organization based in New York that focuses on improving Muslim–Jewish relations and Black–Jewish relations. FFEU was founded in 1989 by Rabbi Marc Schneier and theatrical producer and director Joseph Papp. The goals of the organization are in part motivated by the historical cooperation between African Americans and Jewish Americans during the Civil Rights Movement. Russell Simmons joined the Board of the Foundation for Ethnic Understanding in 2002 as chairman of the board. In 2007, the Foundation began its program in Muslim–Jewish Relations and has since hosted the First National Summit of Imams and Rabbis, two European conferences of Muslim and Jewish Leaders, three Missions of Muslim and Jewish Leaders to Washington D.C., and has held the annual program "The Weekend of Twinning" each November since 2008.

== Muslim–Jewish Relations ==
In 2007, Schneier and Simmons started project to create a global movement of reconciliation between Muslims and Jews. FFEU has engaged Muslim–Jewish Relations on both the grassroots and leadership levels. On November 7, 2007, FFEU hosted the first-ever National Summit of Rabbis and Imams in New York with the participation of imams and rabbis from 11 cities across America. The following year the FFEU launched the 1st Annual Weekend of Twinning, during which 50 mosques and 50 synagogues held one-on-one programs in cities across North America focusing on they similarities in the faith traditions; including common rituals, customs, and beliefs. Each year since 2008, FFEU has hosted a Weekend of Twinning. In 2012, the 5th Weekend of Twinning held programs in 25 countries. During the 5th Weekend of Twinning, a Chanukah Luncheon was hosted by Schneier and Imam Shamsi Ali, featuring the Ashkenazi Chief Rabbi of Israel Yona Metzger and leading American Imams. FFEU partners with the Islamic Society of North America on many of its projects.

In July 2009, FFEU hosted the Mission of European Imams and Rabbis to the U.S., during which nearly 30 European imams, rabbis and Muslim and Jewish leaders visited New York and Washington to learn about FFEU-initiated programs in the U.S. Many of the members of the delegation held Muslim–Jewish encounters in their countries during the 2nd Annual Weekend of Twinning in November 2009. FFEU served as a co-sponsor of two major conferences in Europe; the First Gathering of European Muslim and Jewish Leaders in Brussels in December, 2010 and the Second Gathering of European Muslim and Jewish Leaders in Paris in September 2012. FFEU replicated the success of the European Mission by holding a Mission of Latin American Muslim and Jewish Leaders to Washington in March 2012 and a Mission of Muslim and Jewish Leaders from Australia, South Africa and New Zealand will take place in June 2013.

== Black–Jewish Relations ==
FFEU was created in 1989 to improve relations between African Americans and Jewish Americans. The organization tries to remind Blacks and Jews of their historic partnership during the Civil Rights Movement and to encourage both groups to form new partnerships. Each year, they encourage African Americans and Jewish Americans to celebrate Martin Luther King Day together. In 2006, rapper Jay-Z appeared with Simmons in a public service announcement to condemn anti-semitism and all other forms of racism. Over the years, Simmons has helped FFEU gain the support of LL Cool J, Sean Combs, Jamie Foxx and he and Schneier have gained the support of Jewish and Black leaders like Reverend Al Sharpton, Reverend Jesse Jackson, Martin Luther King III, Steven Spielberg, Ronald Lauder, S. Daniel Abraham, among others.

Schneier wrote a text in Black–Jewish Relations "Shared Dreams: Martin Luther King Jr. and the Jewish Community" which was published in 1999 and featured a preface written by Martin Luther King III. The book has been used as a resource in many of FFEU's Black–Jewish programming.

== Leadership ==
The foundation's leaders include Rabbi Marc Schneier (President), Russell Simmons, chairman, and Ken Sunshine (Secretary), Ali Naqvi, (trustee and chairman, Young Leadership), David Renzer (Trustee), Bob Cyruli, (Counsel) and Michael Heningburg (Treasurer).
