= Luz (bone) =

Hebrew word associated with the top of the spinal column in Judaism

In Jewish mythology, the luz (Hebrew: לוּז, romanized: lûz) is a bone in the spinal column that houses the soul of the human body. In Hebrew, "luz" means almond, though in some editions of the Bible, it is translated as hazel. Jewish traditions teach that the luz is the bone from which the body will be rebuilt at the time of resurrection, and share the idea that this bone does not decay. Rabbi Shraga Simmons teaches that destruction of this bone by cremation could prevent resurrection.

Interpretations disagree as to where in the spine the luz is located. Some say it refers to the small, almond-shaped bone at the top of the spinal column (the first cervical vertebra, C1 or the Atlas), underneath the brain, on the top of the spine, (the bone where the knot of the tefillin rests). Other tradition however identified it with the coccyx, at the bottom end of the eighteen vertebrae. The Talmud, for example, mentions a small bone at the end of the spine, identified as the luz by some. Julius Preuss discusses the Rabbinic views on this and agrees that the luz refers to the coccyx. Similarly, Saul Lieberman also mentioned that popular Jewish tradition identified the luz with the end of the spine, and understand it to be the coccyx.

Within Midrash, there is an aggadah (non-legalistic exegetical story) involving a dispute regarding the luz bone between the Roman Emperor Hadrian and the rabbi Joshua ben Hananiah. Hadrian asks how man would be resurrected at the end times, and Joshua replies it would be "from (the) luz of the spine". When asked to prove his claims, Joshua demonstrates the bone's apparent indestructibility: it could not be softened by water, cremated by fire, crushed by a mill, and when placed on an anvil and struck with a hammer, both the hammer and anvil were broken, but the bone remained undamaged.

In Kabbalah, the Zohar states that the luz is the bone in the spine that appears like the head of a snake, implying that it is the sacrum at the bottom of the spine, because the sacrum is the only bone in the spine that looks like the head of a snake. The sacrum has similar significance to the luz as a source of resurrection in Egyptian and Greek cultures contemporary to the Zohar and Talmud. Likewise, in Islam the coccyx is mentioned, the bone's status as a key component of human resurrection is repeated in several hadiths. The sacrum has a pattern of dimples and shape that appear similar to those of the almond shell.
