= Marc Schneier =

American rabbi

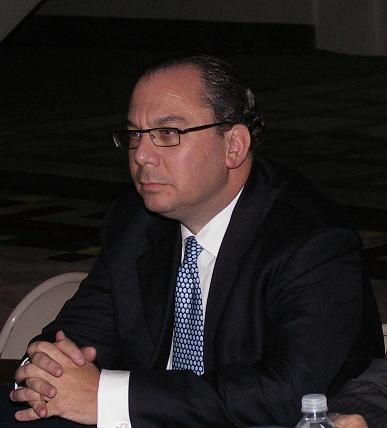
- Born: January 26, 1959 (age 67)
- Occupation: Rabbi

Marc Schneier (born January 26, 1959) is an American rabbi and president of The Foundation for Ethnic Understanding. Schneier previously served as vice-president of the World Jewish Congress.

== Career ==
In 1989, Schneier co-founded the Foundation for Ethnic Understanding with Joseph Papp. The not-for-profit organization based in New York focuses on improving Muslim–Jewish relations and Black–Jewish relations.

In 1990, Schneier founded the Hampton Synagogue in Westhampton Beach in Long Island.

In 1996, he had a minor role, playing a rabbi in the film adaptation of the Holocaust-themed play, The Substance of Fire.

In 1998, Rabbi Schneier convinced Fred Wilpon and George Steinbrenner to get kosher food stands, with the Mets debuting theirs at Shea Stadium that year.

In 1999, Schneier authored the book Shared Dreams: Martin Luther King Jr. and the Jewish Community which is the first reference to the Letter to an Anti-Zionist Friend, an open letter allegedly written by Martin Luther King Jr. which was later determined to be a hoax.

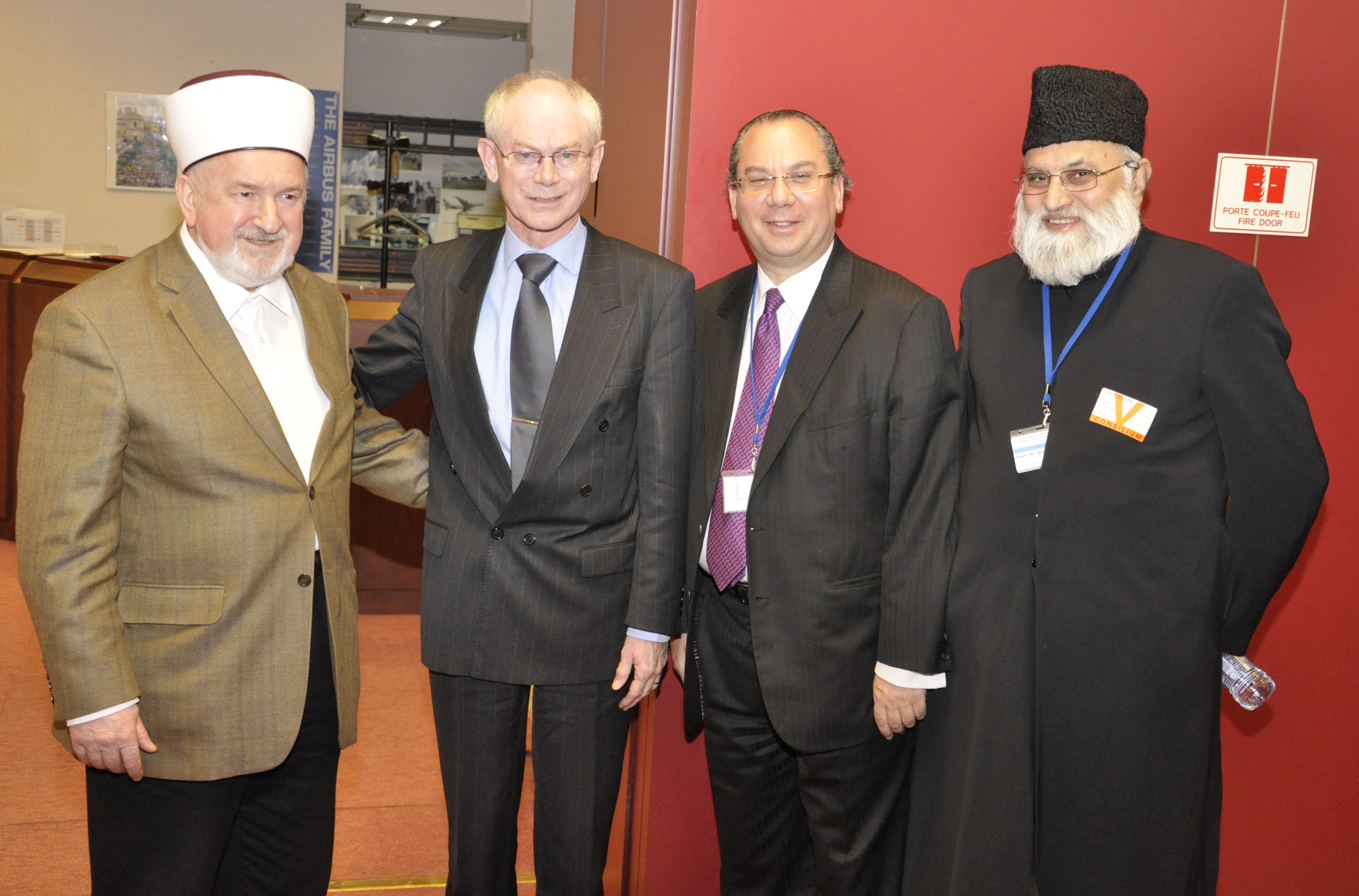
First Gathering of European Muslim and Jewish leaders in Brussels, December 2010 – left to right: Grand Mufti Mustafa Ceric – European Council President Herman Van Rompuy – Rabbi Marc Schneier – Imam Dr. Abdujalil Sajid

Schneier has also worked together with Council on American–Islamic Relations (CAIR), the American Muslim advocacy organization, which the organized American Jewish community has long viewed as "out of bounds" for its alleged ties to the Palestinian terrorist organization Hamas and its broader anti-Israel activity and rhetoric.

In 2013, Schneier co-authored with Imam Shamsi Ali the book Sons of Abraham: A Candid Conversation about the Issues That Divide and Unite Jews and Muslims.

In a 2018 interview with The Times of Israel, Schneier said that he was "of course" a Zionist, adding, "I’m passionate about Israel. You know, I’m all for dialogue, but cross a line with me on Israel, I’m like a rabid dog." Schneier further elaborated to the Times that "Israel is not some 70-year-old political aspiration for the Jewish people. It’s [...] at the very core of Judaism for 3,300 years," and compared a Jew distancing themselves from Israel to a Muslim abandoning halal practices.

In 2022, Rabbi Schneier worked with Qatar's leadership to implement kosher food for the 2022 World Cup.

That same year, Rabbi Schneier was responsible for reconnecting Israel and Turkey, setting up a meeting in March 2022 in Ankara with Israeli President Isaac Herzog and Turkish President Recep Tayyip Erdogan.

Regarding the Abraham Accords, Schneier enumerated Saudi Arabia, Qatar, Indonesia, Pakistan, Oman, Syria and Lebanon, as countries that may normalize relations with Israel in the near future. However, he indicated that "There's going to be very little movement in the Arab world until… Israelis recognize that everyone wants to see a Palestinian state – even if only symbolic."

Hailed as "Rabbi to kings," Rabbi Schneier, an 18th generation rabbi, believes the Abraham Accords will spread.

"Schneier recounts how Muslim world doors opened before him. "My great patron was the late King of Saudi Arabia, King Abdullah… he introduced me to the King of Bahrain, who introduced me to the Emir of Qatar, who introduced me to the ruler of the UAE, who introduced me to [Azerbaijani leader] Aliyev — and then Kazakhstan… Even i24NEWS today said, 'this is the one who planted all the seeds for the Abraham Accords.' "I say everywhere – in Riyadh, Doha, Baku, Ankara – anti-Zionism is antisemitism. Israel is not some political 77-year-old aspiration; it's at the very core of our religion." He adds, "How can you be a Jew and not be a Zionist? Why would you bifurcate? … I am, in this work, a watchdog when it comes to Israel." The leaders, according to him, value his consistency. "One of these leaders said to me, 'Presidents and heads of state, ambassadors — they come and go, and you're always there. We all need a rabbi.'"

== Personal life ==
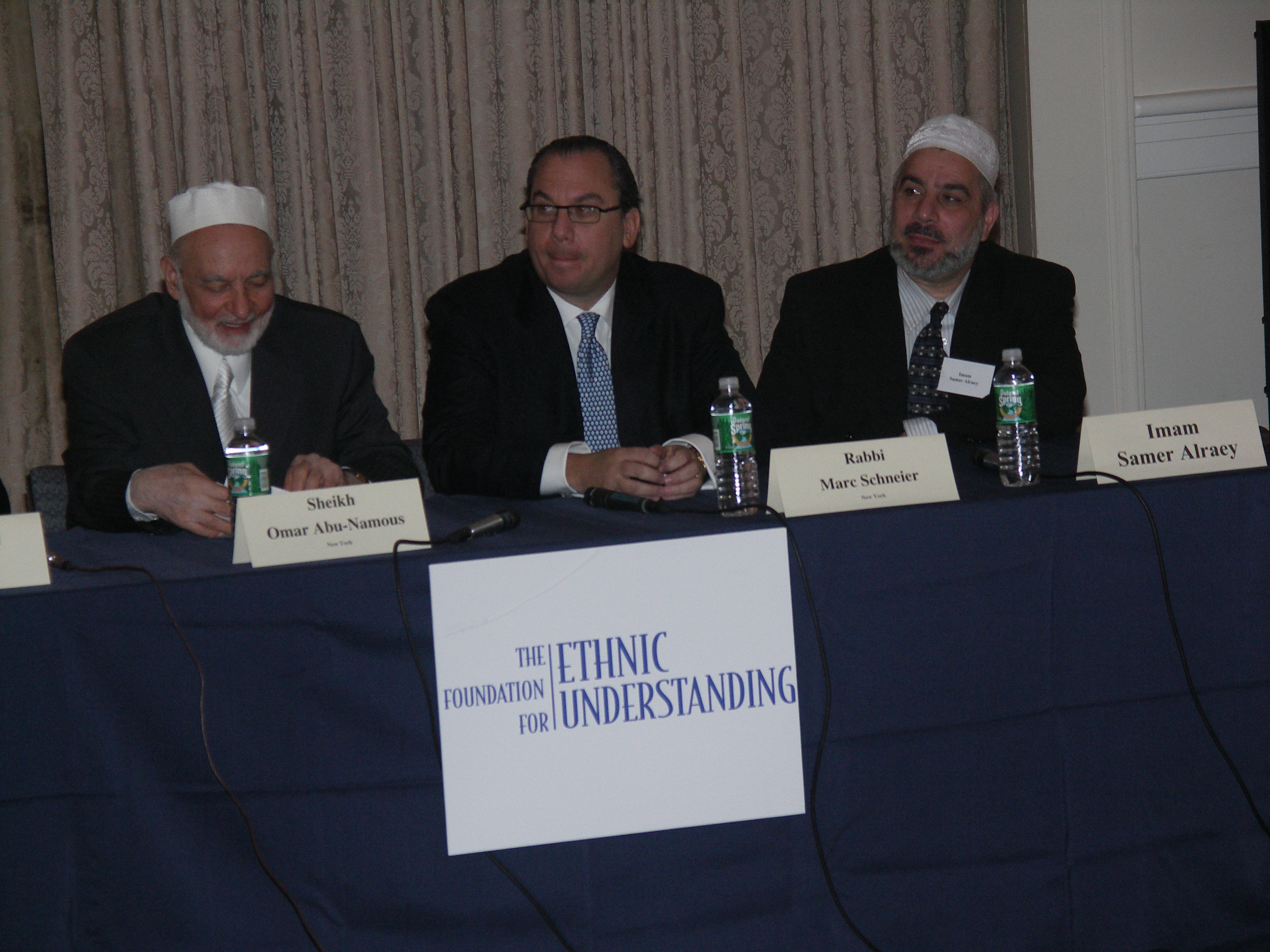
Sheikh Omar Abu-Namous, Rabbi Marc Schneier, and Imam Samer Alraey opening the U.S. national gathering of imams and rabbis on November 7, 2007, sponsored by Schneier's Foundation for Ethnic Understanding and the Islamic Cultural Center of New York in New York City

For his 50th birthday, his fourth wife, Tobi Rubinstein-Schneier, arranged for a 400 lb. endangered Asian lion to be donated in his honor at the Jerusalem Biblical Zoo. The lion was renamed "Rabbi Marc".

Schneier married his 5th wife, on October 6, 2013.

Schneier married his 6th wife, Simi Teitelbaum, in 2017.

In February 2018, it was reported that the State of Florida has ordered Schneier pay $5,000 a month for $64,594 in unpaid child support he owes to his third wife for the care of their then-19 year old son.

He is the son of Rabbi Arthur Schneier.
