= Mukhayriq =

Medinan Jewish rabbi (died 625)

Mukhayriq ibn al-Nadir (Arabic: مخيريق بن النضير, romanized: Mukhayrīq ibn al-Naḍīr) was an Arabian Jewish rabbi who belonged to the Banu Qainuqa' tribe of Medina and fought alongside Islamic prophet Muhammad in the Battle of Uhud on 19 March 625.

== Story ==
Mukhayriq was a wealthy, learned and well-respected rabbi. He was also a leader of the Banu Tha'labah, a notable Arabian tribe with Jewish members in Medina.

According to Omid Safi, Muhammad's biographer Ibn Ishaq was "perhaps deliberately ambiguous on the question whether Mukhayriq formally became Muslim, or whether he was a righteous Jew who had affection for Mohamed." According to Norman A. Stillman, Ibn Ishaq says that Mukhayriq "recognized the Apostle of Allah — may Allah bless him and grant him peace — by his description and by what he found in his scholarship. However, he was accustomed to his own religion, and this held him back, until the Battle of Uhud (625) which fell upon the Sabbath."

The Battle of Uhud was fought between a force from the Muslim community of Medina, led by Muhammad, and a force led by Abu Sufyan ibn Harb from Mecca on March 19, 625. The battle happened to fall on Shabbat, a day of rest in Judaism. In spite of the required observance of Shabbat, Mukhayriq decided he had to fight alongside Muhammad. He then asked his tribesmen to join the battle too. Some agreed, but others reminded the rabbi about the Sabbath. To that, Mukhayriq answered, "You have no Sabbath," and severely censured his tribesmen for not understanding the hidden meaning of the Sabbath. He commanded that if he were killed in the battle all his wealth including date palms should go to Muhammad.

Mukhayriq was killed in the battle. As Muqtedar Khan puts it, Mukhayriq became "the first Jewish martyr of Islam." When a severely wounded Muhammad was told about the death of Mukhayriq, Muhammad said: "He was the best of Jews." However, this statement is not authenticated to come from Muhammad by Islamic standards.

The seven gardens and the other wealth Muhammad inherited from the rabbi were used for the establishment of a waqf, the first ever "charitable endowment of Islam."

== Aftermath ==
In 622 CE, Muhammad and the different tribes that lived in Medina, including Jews of Tha'labah, signed the Constitution of Medina. In accordance with this constitution, all tribes living in Medina entered one nation, called an Ummah, and were obligated to help each other, to fight their common enemies and each to bear their own expenses.

Two Jewish tribes that were allied with Mecca in the Battle of Uhud were expelled from Medina soon after the battle. Two years later, after another battle, the men from the Jewish tribe of Qurayzah were executed.
