= Leon Wieseltier =

American critic and magazine editor (born 1952)

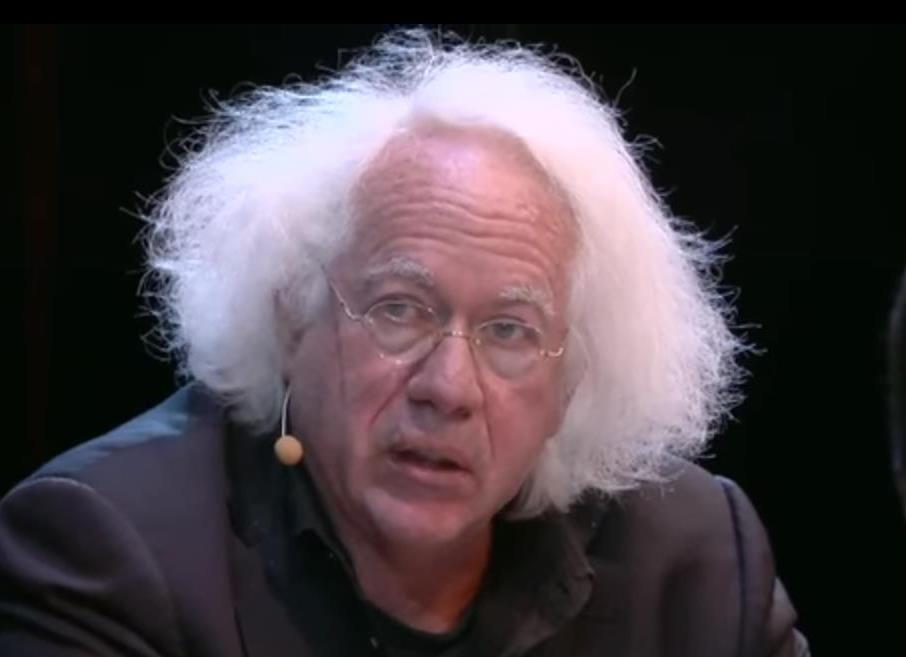
- Wieseltier in 2015
- Born: June 14, 1952 (age 74); New York City, U.S.
- Education: Columbia University; Balliol College, Oxford; Harvard University
- Occupations: Editor; critic
- Spouses: Mahnaz Ispahani (m. 1985; div. 1994); Jennifer Bradley (m. 2000, divorced)
- Awards: Dan David Prize (2013)

Leon Wieseltier (/ˈviːzəltɪər/ VEE-zuhl teer; born June 14, 1952) is an American critic and magazine editor. From 1983 to 2014, he was the literary editor of The New Republic. He was a contributing editor and critic at The Atlantic until 2017, when the magazine fired him following allegations and an admission by Wieseltier of multiple instances of sexual harassment. In 2020, he became the editor of Liberties, a quarterly literary review.

== Early life and education ==
Wieseltier was born in Brooklyn, New York, the son of Stella (Backenroth) and Mark Wieseltier, who were Holocaust survivors from Poland. He attended the Yeshiva of Flatbush, Columbia University, Oxford University, and Harvard University. He was a member of the Harvard Society of Fellows (1979–82).

== Career ==
During his tenure as literary editor of The New Republic, Wieseltier played a central role in editing its "back of the book" or literary, cultural, and arts pages. The magazine's owner, Marty Peretz, discovered Wieseltier, then working at Harvard's Society of Fellows, and installed him in charge of the book review section. In 2007, media critic Eric Alterman called the section "simultaneously erudite and zestful [and] probably [...] Peretz's single most significant positive achievement" in running the magazine.

Wieseltier has published several fiction and nonfiction books. Kaddish, a National Book Award finalist in 2000, was a National Jewish Book Award winner in the Nonfiction category in 1998.

Wieseltier served on the Committee for the Liberation of Iraq and was an outspoken advocate of the George W. Bush administration's invasion of Iraq and the Iraq War. "I am in no sense a neoconservative, as many of my neoconservative adversaries will attest," Wieseltier wrote in a May 2007 letter to Judge Reggie Walton, seeking leniency for his friend Scooter Libby.

In 2013, he was the recipient of the Dan David Prize for being "a foremost writer and thinker who confronts and engages with the central issues of our times, setting the standard for serious cultural discussion in the United States".

In January 2016, it was announced that Wieseltier would be joining Laurene Powell Jobs to form a new publication devoted to exploring the effects of technology on people's lives. But on October 24, 2017, Jobs withdrew funding for the journal after Wieseltier admitted to sexual harassment and inappropriate advances with several former female employees of The New Republic.

In 2020, Wieseltier launched a quarterly journal called Liberties, which was described as being dedicated to "the rehabilitation of liberalism".

=== Sexual harassment acknowledgment (2017) ===
In the immediate aftermath of Harvey Weinstein allegations and the #MeToo movement, a list of "Shitty Media Men" that featured men in the media industry who were accused of sexual misconduct was widely shared on the internet. Wieseltier's name was on the list.

After it was revealed on October 24, 2017, that several former women employees of The New Republic had accused Wieseltier of sexual harassment and inappropriate advances, he admitted to "offenses against some of my colleagues in the past." In a statement he made after the allegations became public, Wieseltier said: “I am ashamed to know that I made [anyone]... feel demeaned and disrespected. I assure them that I will not waste this reckoning.”

According to The New York Times: "Several women... said they were humiliated when Mr. Wieseltier sloppily kissed them on the mouth, sometimes in front of other staff members. Others said he discussed his sex life, once describing the breasts of a former girlfriend in detail. Mr. Wieseltier made passes at female staffers, they said, and pressed them for details about their own sexual encounters. Mr. Wieseltier often commented on what women wore to the office... telling them that their dresses were not tight enough. One woman said he left a note on her desk thanking her for the miniskirt she wore to the office that day. She said she never wore a skirt to the office again".

Another woman who Wieseltier harassed, Sarah Wildman, a former assistant editor of the magazine, later wrote that she was fired for complaining: "In disclosing this incident to my superiors, the outcome was, in many ways, far worse than the act itself. It’s not exactly that I was disbelieved; it’s that in the end, I was dismissed," she wrote in Vox.

Wildman further wrote that the sexual harassment went hand in hand with gender discrimination at the magazine during Peretz's and Wieseltier's tenure: "The women knew we had a far shallower chance of rising up the masthead than our male counterparts; all of us hoped we’d be the exception. To do so, we entered into a game in which the rules were rigged against us, sometimes pushing us well past our point of comfort in order to remain in play."

In 2014, an investigation by outside counsel retained by The New Republic substantiated allegations Wieseltier had subjected an employee of the magazine's office building to unwanted sexual advances and harassment. "We directed Mr. Wieseltier to immediately cease any communication with her, and I made sure he knew The New Republic had a zero-tolerance policy for sexual harassment of any kind," the magazine's then owner, Christopher Hughes, said.

On October 24, 2017, Laurene Powell Jobs withdrew funding for the journal Wieseltier had been working to establish after Wieseltier admitted to sexual harassment and inappropriate advances with several former female employees.

On October 27, 2017, Wieseltier was fired by The Atlantic.

He was also fired by the Brookings Institution, where he had been the Isaiah Berlin Senior Fellow in Culture and Policy.

=== Other ===
At the time of Marilyn Monroe's centenary, Weiseltier commented on the actor casting her spell by radiating

happy carnality, which is why her harsh treatment by men seems especially mean. She tried and tried to be ‘serious,’ but there was no point. She was doomed to be a fantasy. That’s what Billy Wilder saw: that she was both incendiary and naïve. She brought the news that desire is just as exciting when it is sunny as when it is dark.

The elided comment was quoted in The New York Times.

== Criticism ==
Wieseltier was a frequent target of the satirical monthly Spy magazine, which in 1990 cited his frequent cultural commentary in lieu of "serious, important work" and called him the "Woody Allen of Washington", both men apparently being "intellectual name-droppers, unlikely sexual braggarts, [and] smug moralizers; each jealously guards his highbrow credentials while wearing a lowbrow heart on his sleeve." Spy also evoked cosmopolitan pretensions by reporting on a hypercorrect, conflictingly French–German mispronunciation of his name as "Lay-ON Vee-ZEL-tee-AY", and described him as "stuck" in the 1950s with no further explanation.

A 1995 profile in Vanity Fair described Wieseltier's gradual vitiation, with Wieseltier himself admitting, “My faith was not sufficiently strong to withstand my desire to taste wine, eat [non-kosher] food, and kiss women.” He has in fact “been linked to an astonishing array of prominent women”, with his inveterate womanzing eventually spelling the end of his "troubled" first marriage, to Mahnaz Ispahani. He descended into alcoholism and cocaine addiction, financed by the presumably-illicit sale of advance review manuscripts to local bookstores, but claimed to have finally quit the habit in lonce he began dating Twyla Tharp, “a woman of daunting discipline, physical and otherwise”, in late 1993 (the year before his official divorce from Ispahani). Vanity Fair noted Wieselther's concomitant absenteeism and "scant literary output", ultimately delivering a verdict that

Despite his vertiginous I.Q. and prodigious learning, Wieseltier seems to have worked as hard at the construction and maintenance of his glittering image as he has at the occupation of thinking and writing.

The Vanity Fair profile also explicitly quoted a measure of disappointment on behalf of Lionel Trilling and on the part of Sir Isaiah Berlin, Wieseltier's mentors at Columbia University and at the University of Oxford, respectively, with Berlin noting that Wieseltier also failed to complete his doctorate at Harvard University. In the words of Diana Trilling, “Where are the books? Where are the books that should have been written?’ [...] He's found that he's charming...that's a very dangerous thing to discover about oneself. The way our world is designed, it's a great temptation to use what God gave you, all that seductive power, in the expensive waste of the consequentiality of words and in worthlessness.”

In reference to being called a "Jew-baiter" by Wieseltier, Andrew Sullivan has said, "Wieseltier is a connoisseur and cultivator of personal hatred"—referring to a dislike based on "tedious" causes that Wieseltier allegedly has held regarding him for a long time.

In a 2017 essay, “The Tzaddik of the Intellectuals”, alternatively titled “The Sins of Leon Wieseltier: The climb and fall”, Joseph Epstein objected to Wieseltier's lack of intellectual substance and to habitual moralizing that proved to be hypocritical in light of several behaviors: aggressive careerism; a lack of journalistic integrity, for example in requesting that a mistake in a published article be attributed to “a printer's error”; and longtime, aggressive sexual harassment while serving as literary editor for The New Republic, followed by only a rhetorically impressive ahd otherwise hollow apology. In short, “what made it all so rich...[was that] the great humanist turned out to be inhumane, the tzaddik wore no tzitzit but all these years was mentally undressing and offending his female co-workers.”

== Personal life ==
Wieseltier and Mahnaz Ispahani married in 1985, and divorced in 1994. Justice Ruth Bader Ginsburg officiated at their wedding in 1985.

After a long-term relationship with choreographer Twyla Tharp, he married his second wife, Jennifer Bradley, who worked on urban-development issues at the Brookings Institution. The Washington Post reported that Supreme Court Justice Ruth Bader Ginsburg would also officiate at their October 2000 wedding. As of 2020, the couple was in the midst of a divorce.

== In popular culture ==
Wieseltier appeared in one episode of the fifth season of The Sopranos, playing Stewart Silverman, a character whom Wieseltier described as "a derangingly materialistic co-religionist who dreams frantically of 'Wedding of the Week' and waits a whole year for some stupid car in which he can idle for endless hours in traffic east of Quogue every weekend of every summer, the vulgar Zegna-swaddled brother of a Goldman Sachs mandarin whose son's siman tov u'mazel tov is provided by a pulchritudinous and racially diverse bunch of shellfish-eating chicks in tight off-the-shoulder gowns".
