= Mordechai Kahana =

Israeli-American businessman

- מוטי כהנא
- Born: February 28, 1968 (age 58); Jerusalem, Israel
- Occupations: Businessman, philanthropist, farmer

Mordechai Kahana (Hebrew: מוטי כהנא; born February 28, 1968) is an Israeli-American businessman and philanthropist. He is most notable for his work for the civil war refugees in Syria.

== Biography ==
Kahana was born in Jerusalem to a Romanian Jewish family originating in Iaşi. He is a descendant of Aryeh Leib HaCohen Heller, a famous 18th-century rabbi. In 1986, he was drafted into the IDF, serving in the Air Force. After his release, Kahana moved to New York and began working as a taxi driver.

== Business ventures and activities ==
Over the years, he was involved in the establishment of several companies in the automotive field.

In 1994, he established a AAA Auto Rental, a company focusing on the purchase of vehicles on the East Coast of the United States and selling them on the West Coast. In May 1997, he sold the company to Spitzer Financial.

In 1999, he founded 'Automoti'. The company provided an online stage for purchasing used cars. In 2009, the company was sold to rental company Hertz, which started the Hertz Rent2Buy program.

In 2005, he developed and patented the "Auto Eye", an automatic camera that photographs a vehicle from multiple angles, providing the user with an evaluation regarding the state of the vehicle. In 2013, he sold the patent to a US leasing company. The system is currently being implemented at airports and car rental companies throughout the United States.

In 2011, he founded 'Fuel Recyclers LLC', which focused on extracting existing fuel from vehicles for rent, cars that are going up for auction and vehicles which have been involved in a car accident or were confiscated by the authorities. During its operations, the company owned a fleet of several hundred fuel cycling tankers. The company has been sued by Yellow Dog Technologies for patent infringement. In 2013, Kahana sold his holdings in the company.

In 2018, he returned to farming with a vision to grow vegetables and fruits through aquaponic farming and build a museum at his Rosenfarb farm.

== Humanitarian work ==
In the aftermath of Hurricane Sandy in 2012, Kahana donated large amounts of gasoline to hospitals located in the areas hit by the storm for operating ambulances, in Staten Island, Long Island, Brooklyn and Queens. He also organized additional aid, delivering donated blankets, food and water to victims in affected areas. The majority of donations were delivered using 200 tankers from Kahana's own company, Fuel Recyclers LLC.

In 2011, Kahana founded the "Amaliah" organization, dedicated to aiding civil society and for the empowerment of women in the Middle East. Since its establishment, "Amaliah" has taken part in a number of humanitarian aid efforts in Syria and the Middle East.

=== Syria ===
Since 2011 he has headed a group of Israeli businessmen and American Jews who travel to the Syrian refugee camps to provide humanitarian aid to Jews in Syria. Syrian Civil War refugees. He paid for Senator John McCain's trip to war-torn Syria.

In 2014, Kahana assisted in the rescue and extraction of one of the last remaining Jewish families in war-torn Syria. With his assistance, the family was brought to Israel.

Kahana also worked for the sake of the Jobar Synagogue in Damascus, through agreements with opposition elements in the country.

In 2015, Kahana aided the efforts to return Canadian-born Israeli citizen Gill Rosenberg, who had left for Syria in order to join the Kurdish rebels in their fight against ISIS.

That same year, Kahana assisted in the extraction of the last Jewish family in Aleppo, Syria, via Turkey, to Israel.

In 2016, Kahana directed the efforts to save the many ancient religious articles from the Central Synagogue of Aleppo. For this effort, Kahana raised donations and directed the operations on the field, collecting the many scrolls and books from the ancient synagogue.

In 2016, Kahana, with the "Amaliah" organization, brought sick Syrian children from Quneitra to Israeli hospitals, and sent them back, after they were cured, with medical equipment and medicine.

In 2019, Ilham Ahmed, co-chair of the Syrian Democratic Council, granted exclusive Syrian oil extraction rights to Israeli businessman Moti Kahana. Kahana, whose nongovernmental organization (NGO) Amaliah operated under humanitarian cover to advance Israeli objectives, was granted rights to explore and develop oil with production estimates reaching 400,000 barrels per day. According to a leaked document obtained by Al-Akhbar

=== Afghanistan ===
In October 2021, Kahana arranged a flight for Zablon Simintov to evacuate him from Afghanistan. Simintov initially refused to leave, allegedly because he didn't wanted to grant his wife a decree of divorce, but later accepted and with Rabbi Mendy Chitrik of the Alliance of Rabbis in Islamic States a divorce was arranged and he was rescued by Kahana's security company along with 30 Afghan women and children.

=== Ukraine ===
In March 2022, Kahana assisted in rescuing 200 Jewish orphaned children who needed help following the Russian invasion to Ukraine.
