= Zabulon =

Zabulon may refer to:

- Zebulun, biblical founder of a tribe of Israelites
- Sabulon, an ancient city, former bishopric and present Latin Catholic titular see
- the Zabulon skipper, Lon zabulon or Poanes zabulon, (alias southern dimorphic skipper), a North American butterfly
- Zabulon (Night Watch), a fictional character in the World of Watches
- Zabulon, English translation for the city of Cabul in northern Palestine
- Zablon Simintov, an Afghan Jewish man
