= Cabal in Kabul =

2006 documentary film

- Directed by: Dan Alexe
- Produced by: Serge Kestemont
- Starring: Zabulon Simantov; Yitzchak Levin
- Release date: 2006
- Running time: 87 minutes
- Country: Belgium
- Language: Dari with English subtitles

Cabal in Kabul (French: Cabale à Kaboul) is a documentary film directed by filmmaker Dan Alexe. It follows the lives of two men, Zabulon Simantov (Hebrew: זבולון סימן-טוב) and Yitzchak Levin (Hebrew: יצחק לוי), who at the time were believed to be the last remaining Jews in Afghanistan.

== Background ==
Isaac and Zabulon lived in the courtyard of the synagogue in Kabul. Isaac, the eldest of the two, resided on the ground floor selling amulets to his Muslim neighbors. He is seen wearing a kippah sembling those worn by Bukharan Jews. Zabulon, who lived on the upper floor, sells illegally produced wine.

The pair had been acquainted for many years, and they are seen constantly expressing their jealousy and distaste for one another. The Taliban had once imprisoned them, but released the two when their bickering prolonged.

== Reception ==
Unifrance said that the hatred between Zabulon and Isaac is "intense", making the movie far from dull despite the otherwise lonely and isolated existence. Filmfest Hamburg labelled the film as a tragicomedy that explores the lingering pieces of a former society.

Contrastingly, Jacques Mandelbaum of the French newspaper Le Monde wrote that the film worryingly did not show any sympathy for the subjects nor their hostilities towards each other. He criticized the filmmaker for taking a stance of indifference in its portrayal, and for attempting to exploit the pair's relationship.
