= Sarah Wildman =

American journalist

External audio
- Box Of Love Letters Reveals Grandfather Didn't Escape WWII With 'Everyone', NPR, November 25, 2014

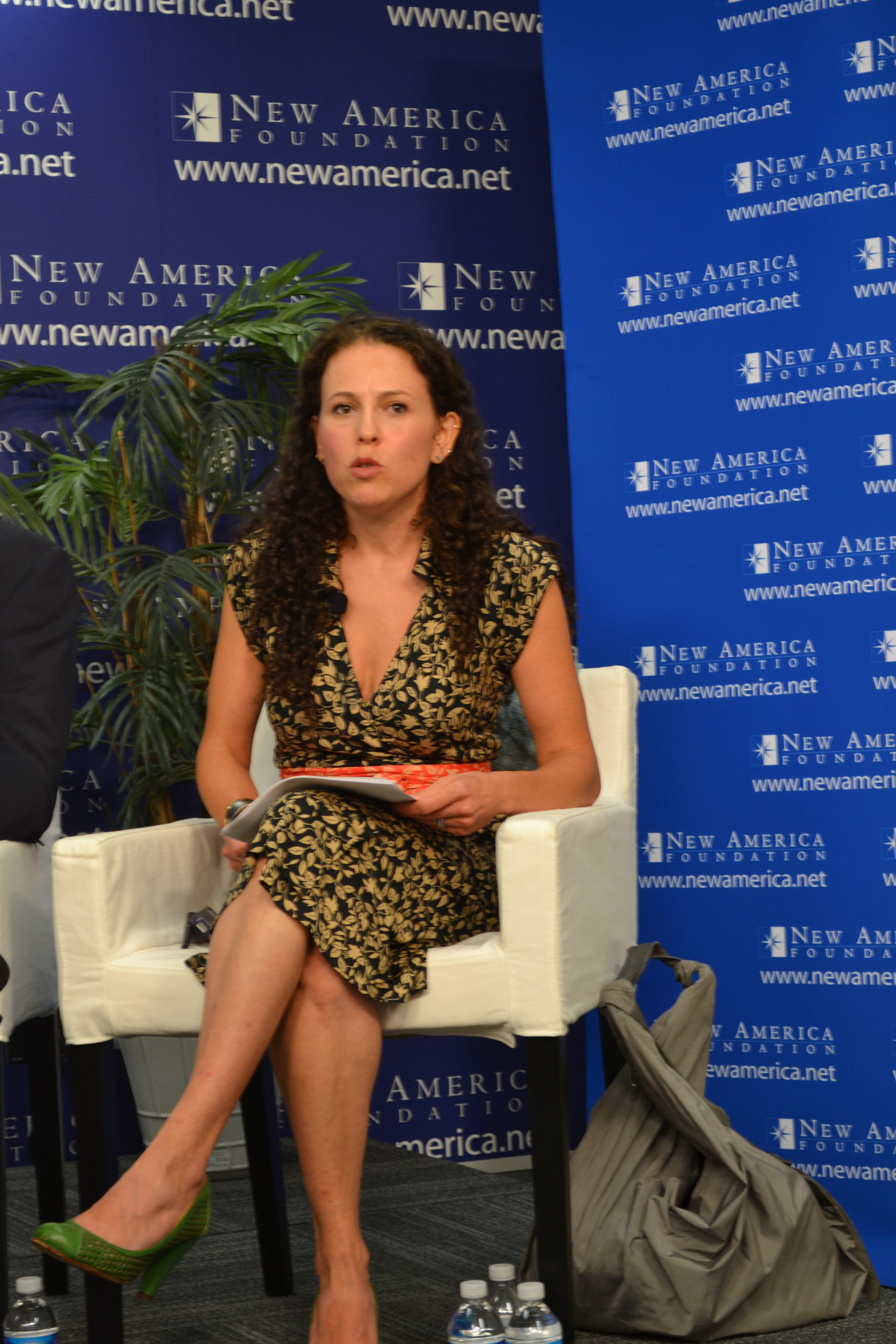
Sarah Wildman in 2014.

Sarah Wildman is an American journalist and non-fiction writer.

== Life ==
Wildman is currently a staff editor and writer for the New York Times opinion section. She was a Milena Jesenská Journalism Fellow at the Institute for Human Sciences and won the Peter R. Weitz Prize from the German Marshall Fund. She was a senior correspondent for the American Prospect. She was a visiting scholar at the Paul H. Nitze School of Advanced International Studies. Her work has appeared in The Forward, The Guardian, Slate, and The New Yorker. She is the author of Paper Love: The Search for the Girl My Grandfather Left Behind, a "third-generation" Holocaust memoir that "answers questions about how we can find new ways to talk about the Holocaust and its memory."

=== Speaking out about sexual harassment ===
Wildman previously worked as assistant editor of The New Republic while Marty Peretz was the owner and editor. In 2017, she wrote that another editor, Leon Wieseltier, harassed her and that she was fired in retaliation for complaining: "In disclosing this incident to my superiors, the outcome was, in many ways, far worse than the act itself. It’s not exactly that I was disbelieved; it’s that in the end, I was dismissed", she wrote in Vox.

Wildman wrote: "The women knew we had a far shallower chance of rising up the masthead than our male counterparts; all of us hoped we’d be the exception. To do so, we entered into a game in which the rules were rigged against us, sometimes pushing us well past our point of comfort in order to remain in play."

== Works ==
- Amy Sohn; Sarah Wildman (23 February 2004). Sex and the City: Kiss and Tell. Simon and Schuster. ISBN 978-0-7434-5730-9.
- Paper Love: Searching for the Girl My Grandfather Left Behind. Penguin Publishing Group. 30 October 2014. ISBN 978-1-101-61616-1.
