= Bar Siman Tov =

Notable people with the surname Bar Siman Tov include:

- Moshe Bar Siman Tov, Israeli economist and health official
- Yaacov Bar-Siman-Tov, Israeli international relations and conflict resolution scholar

== See also ==
- Siman tov
