= Yu Aw Synagogue =

Abandoned synagogue in Herat, Afghanistan

- Persian: کنیسای یوآو
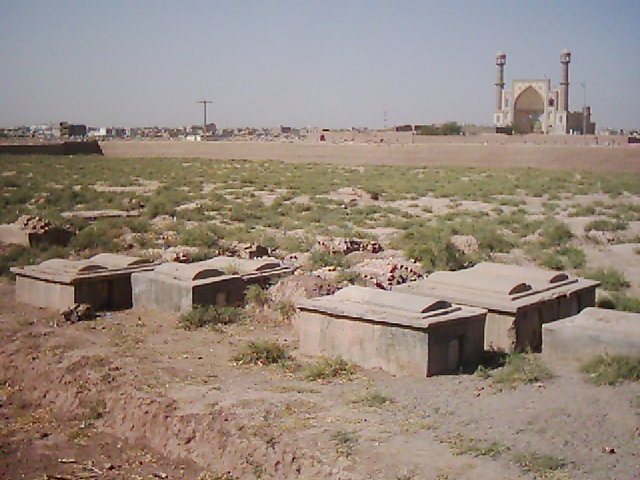

- Location of the former synagogue in Afghanistan

Religion
- Affiliation: Orthodox Judaism (former)
- Ecclesiastical or organizational status: Synagogue
- Status: Abandoned

Location
- Location: Momanda, Herat, Afghanistan
- Interactive map of Yu Aw Synagogue
- Coordinates: 34°20′21″N 62°11′12″E

Architecture
- Style: Persian

Specifications
- Direction of façade: West
- Materials: Mud brick

The Yu Aw Synagogue (Persian: کنیسای یوآو) is an abandoned Orthodox Jewish congregation and synagogue, located in the Momanda neighbourhood of the old city of Herat, in western Afghanistan. The area was once known as Mahalla-yi Musahiya, or the "Neighbourhood of the Jews". It is the only synagogue in Herat that has been preserved with most of its original characteristics, although it is currently in a state of disrepair.

== History ==
There is no definitive date of construction of the synagogue. When Israel was founded in 1948, the estimated 280 Jewish families that lived in Herat began leaving. As of 2021, there were no Jews in Afghanistan.

In 2020, Al Jazeera reported that part of the complex was restored by the local government in 2009. It is the only synagogue in Herat that has been preserved with most of its original features. Although badly damaged, it was recently converted into an infant school. There are three other synagogues in Herat, in a more advanced state of disrepair, two had been converted to schools and one to a mosque. Not far from the synagogue there is still a mikvah formerly called Hamman-e Yahudiha, which was converted into a hammam for Muslim men. There is also a Jewish cemetery that contains around 1,000 graves.

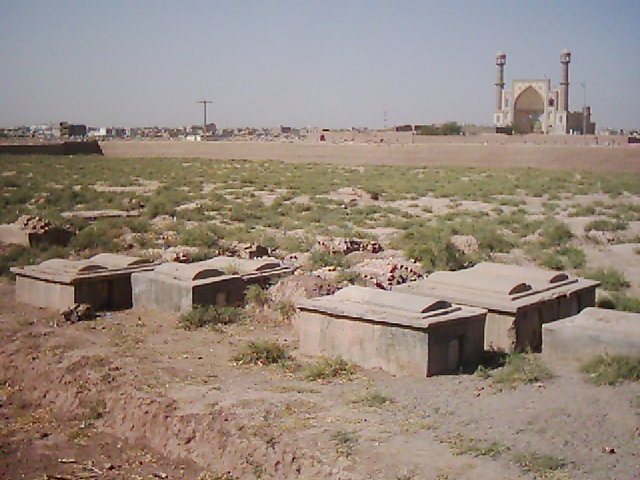
Herat Jewish Cemetery

=== Restoration ===
The synagogue was restored in 2009 with funding from Swiss NGO Aga Khan Trust for Culture. Restoration of the interior blue, hand-painted dome by local craftsmen was funded by the Islamic Republic of Afghanistan, but all but stopped after the government's fall during the 2021 Taliban offensive.

However, in October 2022, the Taliban-run Islamic Emirate of Afghanistan announced a 16-month project to prevent the synagogue's structural collapse and to rehabilitate the community's mikveh. Most of the $500,000 cost is being funded by the Aliph Foundation.

== Description ==
The remains of the building on the east, north and south sides of the courtyard are now used as family housing. A room in the basement of the structure on the west side of the courtyard is used for housing by one of the employees of the Herat Department of Historic Monuments Preservation. The remainder of the building is in a precarious condition. Annette Ittig's report does not date the synagogue.

A preliminary survey carried out by Annette Ittig in 1998 noted that:

The main prayer hall still has much of its painted stucco decoration, which is primarily floral, with a strong Persianate influence, e.g. the flowering "trees of life" and the butas, or paisley motifs, set to either side of the Torah Ark on the western wall.... The ark is elevated and is reached by stairs. The room itself is octagonal in shape.... On the south side of prayer hall is an arcade with a partition with small decorative openings that served as the women's gallery. The low open bimah, which is placed below the central dome, remains intact.... There are three Hebrew inscriptions on the north wall above the stairway....

== See also ==
- History of the Jews in Afghanistan
- List of former synagogues in Afghanistan
- Oldest synagogues in the world
