= History of the Jews in Afghanistan =

Afghan Jews
افغان یهودان יהודי אפגניסטן
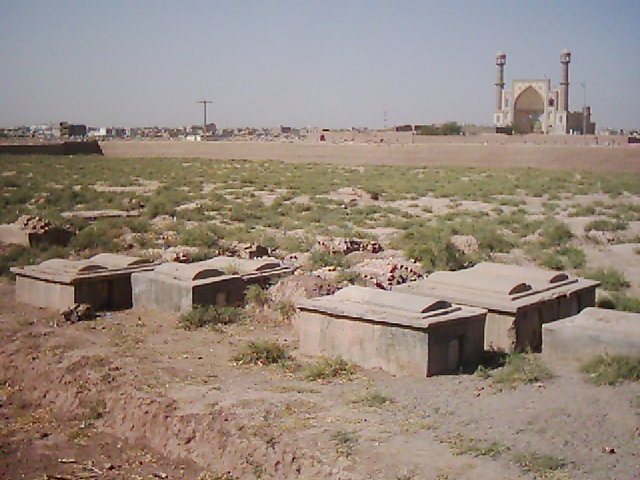
- Jewish cemetery in the city of Herat, 2009

Total population
- 10,400

Regions with significant populations
- Israel: 10,050
- United States: 300
- United Kingdom: 50

Languages
- Hebrew, Dari Persian, Tajik Persian, and Pashto

Religion
- Judaism

Related ethnic groups
- Iranian Jews and Bukharian Jews

Ancient Iranian tradition suggests that Jews settled in Balkh, a Zoroastrian and Buddhist stronghold at the time, now in the north of Afghanistan. The Kingdom of Judah collapsed in 587 BCE leading to this migration. In modern times, decades of extreme persecution have led to the country's Jewish population disappearing entirely.

At the time of the large-scale 2021 Taliban offensive, only two Jews were still residing in the country: Zablon Simintov and his distant cousin Tova Moradi. When the Islamic Emirate of Afghanistan was re-established by the Taliban in August 2021, both Simintov and Moradi immigrated to Israel on 7 September 2021 and 29 October 2021, respectively, leaving Afghanistan completely empty of known Jews. A video supposedly showing the last Jews in the country arguing with each other went viral on social media.

The overwhelming majority of the Afghan Jewish community today - a branch of Iranian-Jewry - resides in Israel, with a small group of a few hundred living in the United States and the United Kingdom.

In Afghanistan, the Jews had formed a community of leather and karakul merchants, landowners, and moneylenders. Jewish families mostly lived in the cities of Herat and Kabul, while their patriarchs traveled back and forth on trading trips across Central Asia and Iran. They carved their prayers in Hebrew and Aramaic on mountain rocks as they moved between the routes of the Silk Road.

== History ==
Mashiach Gul and Daniel Gul, president of the Afghan Jewish community. (Jerusalem in 1917).

=== Antiquity and medieval era ===
Existing records of a Jewish presence in Afghanistan date back to the 7th century CE, although ancient Iranian tradition holds that there was a Jewish presence in Afghanistan as early as the time of Israel and Judah. There are also origin theories among some Pashtuns that claim their descent from the Ten Lost Tribes of the Israelites. The town of Balkh was a major center of Jewish life in ancient Afghanistan; some Islamic traditions hold that Balkh was the burial place of Ezekiel and the home of Jeremiah, both Jewish and Muslim prophets. Jews also settled in Herat, which was an important location on the Silk Road as well as on other trading routes. In modern times, ruins from Jewish settlements still exist in the city, including a Jewish cemetery. The 12th-century Arab geographer Muhammad al-Idrisi wrote that the city of Kabul had a Jewish quarter. In the 18th century, Jews who had served in the army of Nader Shah settled in Kabul as his treasury guards. In 2011, the Afghan Geniza, an 11th-century collection of Jewish manuscript fragments that was compiled in Hebrew, Aramaic, Judaeo-Arabic, and Judaeo-Persian, was found in a cave network in Afghanistan. Some 29 pages from the collection were purchased by the Jerusalem-based National Library of Israel in 2013.

=== Modern era ===
The majority of modern day Afgan Jews were Persian Jews (predominantly from Mashhad) who settled in Kabul and Herat in the 17th and 18th century.

==== Soviet refugee crisis ====
At the outset of the 20th century, there were about 40,000 Afghan Jews. Following the Kazakh famine of 1930–1933, a significant number of Bukharan Jews crossed the border into the Kingdom of Afghanistan as part of the wider famine-related refugee crisis; leaders of the communities petitioned Jewish communities in Europe and the United States for support. In total, some 60,000 refugees had fled from the Soviet Union and reached Afghanistan. In 1932, Mohammed Nadir Shah signed a border treaty with the Soviets in order to prevent asylum seekers from crossing into Afghanistan from Soviet Central Asia. Later that year, Afghanistan began deporting Soviet-origin refugees either back to the Soviet Union or to specified territories in China. Soviet Jews who were already present in Afghanistan with the intent to flee further south were detained in Kabul, and all Soviet Jews who were apprehended at the border were immediately deported. All Soviet citizens, including these Bukharan Jews, were suspected by both the Afghan and British government officials of conducting espionage with the intention to disseminate Bolshevik propaganda.

From September 1933, many of these ex-Soviet Jewish refugees in northern Afghanistan were forcibly relocated to major cities such as Kabul and Herat, but continued to live in under restrictions on work and trade. Whilst it has been claimed that the November 1933 assassination of Mohammad Nadir Shah made the situation worse, this is likely to have had only a limited influence. In 1935, the Jewish Telegraphic Agency reported that "ghetto rules" had been imposed on Afghan Jews, requiring them to wear particular clothes, requiring Jewish women to stay outside markets, requiring all Jews to live within certain distances from mosques and banning Jews from riding horses. In 1935, a delegate to the World Zionist Congress claimed that an estimated 40,000 Bukharan Jews had been killed or starved to death. In mid-1935, riots erupted in Herat, the Afghan city with the largest Jewish population, over a dispute between two boys— one Jewish and one Muslim. The two boys got into a fight for unknown reasons, during which the Muslim boy fell down a flight of stairs. The Jewish boy, Aba ben Simon, was blamed, and others began spreading rumors that he was trying to convert the Muslim boy to Judaism. From 1935 to 1941, under Prime Minister Mohammad Hashim Khan (the uncle of the king), Nazi Germany was the most influential country in Afghanistan. The Nazis regarded most of the Afghans as Aryans. In 1938, it was reported that Jews were allowed to work only as shoe-polishers.

==== Attempted migrations to India ====
Some Afghan Jews attempted to emigrate to British India, but when they arrived on the border, the colonial authorities categorised them according to their passports; those with Soviet passports were accused of having "Bolshevist ties" and denied entry. Many Afghan Jews were deported back to Soviet-controlled territories under the guise of allegedly violating the "behavioural conduct" codes of British India, although historians have made note of the fact that the colonial government's fear that the emigrants would spread socialist ideas among the Indian public and offer encouragement to the independence movement played a much larger part in its decision to deport them.

The living conditions of Jews continued to worsen in both Kabul and Herat. Many Afghan Jews illegally emigrated to British India during the 1940s during the Second World War. Thousands of Afghan Jews also emigrated to Mandatory Palestine during the war, but most of them emigrated to the State of Israel after it was founded in 1948. Some Afghan Jews also emigrated to the United States, most of whom settled in the New York City borough of Queens.

== Emigration ==
In 1948, there were over 5,000 Jews in Afghanistan. Afghanistan was the only Muslim country which allowed Jewish emigrants to keep their citizenship. Most Afghan Jews moved to Israel or the United States. By 1969, approximately 300 Jews remained in Afghanistan, but most of them left Afghanistan after the Soviet invasion in 1979, leaving only 10 Jews in Afghanistan in 1996, most of whom lived in Kabul. Currently, more than 10,000 Jews of Afghan descent live in Israel. Over 200 Afghan Jewish families live in New York. Over 100 Jews of Afghan descent live in London.

== End of Afghanistan's Jewish community ==
By the end of 2004, only three known Jews were left in Afghanistan: Zablon Simintov, Isaac Levy (born c. 1920), and, it later emerged, Simintov's cousin Tova Moradi.

Levy relied on charity to survive, while Simintov ran a store selling carpets and jewelry until 2001. They lived on opposite sides of the dilapidated Kabul synagogue. They kept denouncing each other to the authorities, and both of them spent time in Taliban jails. The Taliban also confiscated the synagogue's Torah scroll. The contentious relationship between Simintov and Levy was dramatized in a play which was inspired by news reports about the lives of the two men, which were released by the international news media following the U.S.-led invasion of Afghanistan and the overthrow of the Taliban regime. The play, titled The Last Two Jews of Kabul, was written by playwright Josh Greenfeld and was staged in New York in 2002.

In January 2005, Levy died of natural causes, leaving the world believing Simintov was the sole known Jew in Afghanistan. He cared for the only synagogue in Afghanistan's capital, Kabul. He was still trying to recover the confiscated Torah. Simintov, who does not speak Hebrew, claimed that the man who stole the Torah is now in US custody in Guantanamo Bay. Simintov has a wife and two daughters, all of whom emigrated to Israel in 1998, and he said he was considering joining them. However, when he was asked if he would go to Israel during an interview, Simintov retorted, "Go to Israel? What business do I have there? Why should I leave?" In April 2021, Simintov announced that he would emigrate to Israel after the High Holy Days of 2021, due to the fear that the planned withdrawal of US troops from Afghanistan would result in the Taliban's return to power. Throughout August 2021, Simintov remained in Kabul, despite having had a chance to escape.

After receiving death threats from the Taliban and the ISIS-KP, Simantov emigrated to a presently undisclosed country before the Jewish holiday of Rosh Hashanah on 6 September 2021. He brought 30 other refugees with him, including 28 women and children.

Two months later, it turned out that a previously unrevealed distant cousin of Simintov, Tova Moradi, had fled Afghanistan sometime in October, making her the last Jew known to be in Afghanistan for the intervening month. Contrary to official reports which stated that "no Jewish" person was living in the country, it is believed that Moradi was the last Jew who lived in Afghanistan.

Due to decades of warfare, antisemitism, and extreme religious persecution, there are officially no Jews remaining in Afghanistan today.

== Remaining synagogues and sites ==
The Kabul synagogue that Zablon Simintov was a caretaker of until his last day in Afghanistan is located in District 4 of Kabul, in "kuche-ye Gol Forushiha" (Persian: کوچه گل فروشیها, The Florists' Alleyway). Simintov's neighbors promised him that they would maintain the synagogue of Kabul in his absence.

=== Synagogues in Herat ===
In the city of Herat, the historic centre of Afghan Jews, there are 4 synagogues, 1 public bath, as well as a Jewish cemetery and several abandoned houses. The Yu Aw Synagogue (Persian: کنیسه یوآو), the largest of the Synagogues, still exists in Herat, in western Afghanistan. It is a disused synagogue, which still has most of its original characteristics. This synagogue is composed of 3 floors, a main congregation room, several side rooms and corridors, as well as 7 domes of different sizes. The Yu Aw synagogue underwent renovation in recent years and it was also added to Herat's list of protected cultural sites.

The second synagogue, the 'Gulkiya Synagogue (Persian: کنیسه گلکیا) was converted into a mosque and today, it continues to be used as the Balal Mosque. Despite the takeover of the Synagogue, its structure and design have not changed, and the building has undergone renovation in recent years. The synagogue's mikveh has fallen into disrepair and as a result, it is no longer accessible to the public. The third synagogue, Shemayel Synagogue (Persian: کنیسه شمائیل) has been converted to an elementary school, and has also been renovated in recent years. The fourth synagogue, the Mulla Ashur Synagogue (Persian: کنیسه ملا عاشور), located within Herat's historic Bazar, has been left abandoned, and as a result, it is in a state of disrepair. The Jewish public bath also remains abandoned, and the building is also in need of urgent renovation in order to prevent its complete destruction. The bath was operational in Herat's Bazaar until 2018.

There is also a small Jewish cemetery in Herat. Some of the tombstones have information about the deceased persons which is written on them in Hebrew. In recent years, some of the tombstones and the wall which surrounds the cemetery have been repaired thanks to donations which were sent by the Afghan Jewish Community which lives in the State of Israel. Before the fall of the government of the Afghan Islamic Republic to the Taliban, Herat's cultural officials stated that at the time of the forced departure of the Herati Jews, on a stone inscription, the community stated that it had transferred the responsibility of caring for the Synagogues, the public bath, and the cemetery to the government which ruled Afghanistan when the inscription was written. The state of these historic buildings and the Taliban's plans for them have remained unknown since Afghanistan fell to the Islamist group which has terrorized religious minorities in the past.

== See also ==
- Antisemitism in Islam
- History of the Jews under Muslim rule
- Islamic–Jewish relations
- Jewish exodus from the Muslim world § Afghanistan
- Cabal in Kabul
