= Avraham Hamra =

Syrian-Israeli rabbi (1943–2021)

Avraham Hamra אברהם חמרה ابراهام حمرا
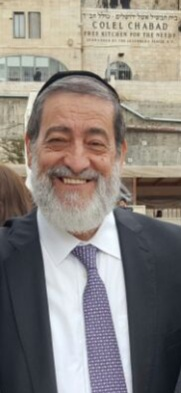
- Rabbi Hamra in 2017

Personal life
- Born: 1943 Damascus, Mandate for Syria and the Lebanon
- Died: 7 May 2021 (aged 77–78) Holon, Israel
- Children: 6

Religious life
- Religion: Judaism

Jewish leader
- Predecessor: Nissim Nadabo Cohen
- Successor: Binyamin Hamra
- Position: Chief Rabbi of Syria
- Began: 1976
- Ended: 1994

Rabbi Avraham Hamra (Hebrew: אברהם חמרה; 1943 – 7 May 2021) was a Syrian-Israeli rabbi. He served as chief rabbi of Syrian and Lebanese Jews and was the last chief rabbi of Syria.

== Early life ==
Rabbi Hamra was born in Damascus in 1943. He worked for two years as a teacher at a local Jewish school before assuming the role of principal in 1963. In 1970, he became a member of the community committee serving the local Jewish population. He was Cantor in the local synagogue and had many connections in the Syrian government and would help the community with whatever they needed.

== Rabbinical career ==
In 1972, he was appointed deputy chief rabbi of Damascus. In 1976, Rabbi Hamra was appointed chief rabbi, a position he held until he left Syria after years of aiding the community with financial support and helping thousands of Syrian Jews escape syria with most of the country's remaining Jews in October 1994 when then Syrian President Hafez al-Assad allowed the last Syrian Jews to leave, on condition that they immigrate to the United States rather than Israel. Rabbi Hamra immigrated to Brooklyn, New York before leaving for Israel.

Upon his arrival in Israel, Rabbi Hamra settled in Holon and was appointed to the religious council. In addition to serving and leading the city's Syrian community, the rabbi frequently visited the Jewish Syrian community in New York. In the 1990s, he worked with Mossad to smuggle Jewish artifacts out of Syria. Hamra also served on the Presidium Council of the Alliance of Rabbis in Islamic States.

In December 2017, Rabbi Hamra's daughter Aliza and three of her children were killed in a house fire in Brooklyn, New York.

Rabbi Hamra Passed Away in May 2021 and is laid to rest in Israel, at the age of 78. Syrian President Bashar al-Assad sent his condolences.
