= Shimon Elituv =

Israeli rabbi (1937–2023)

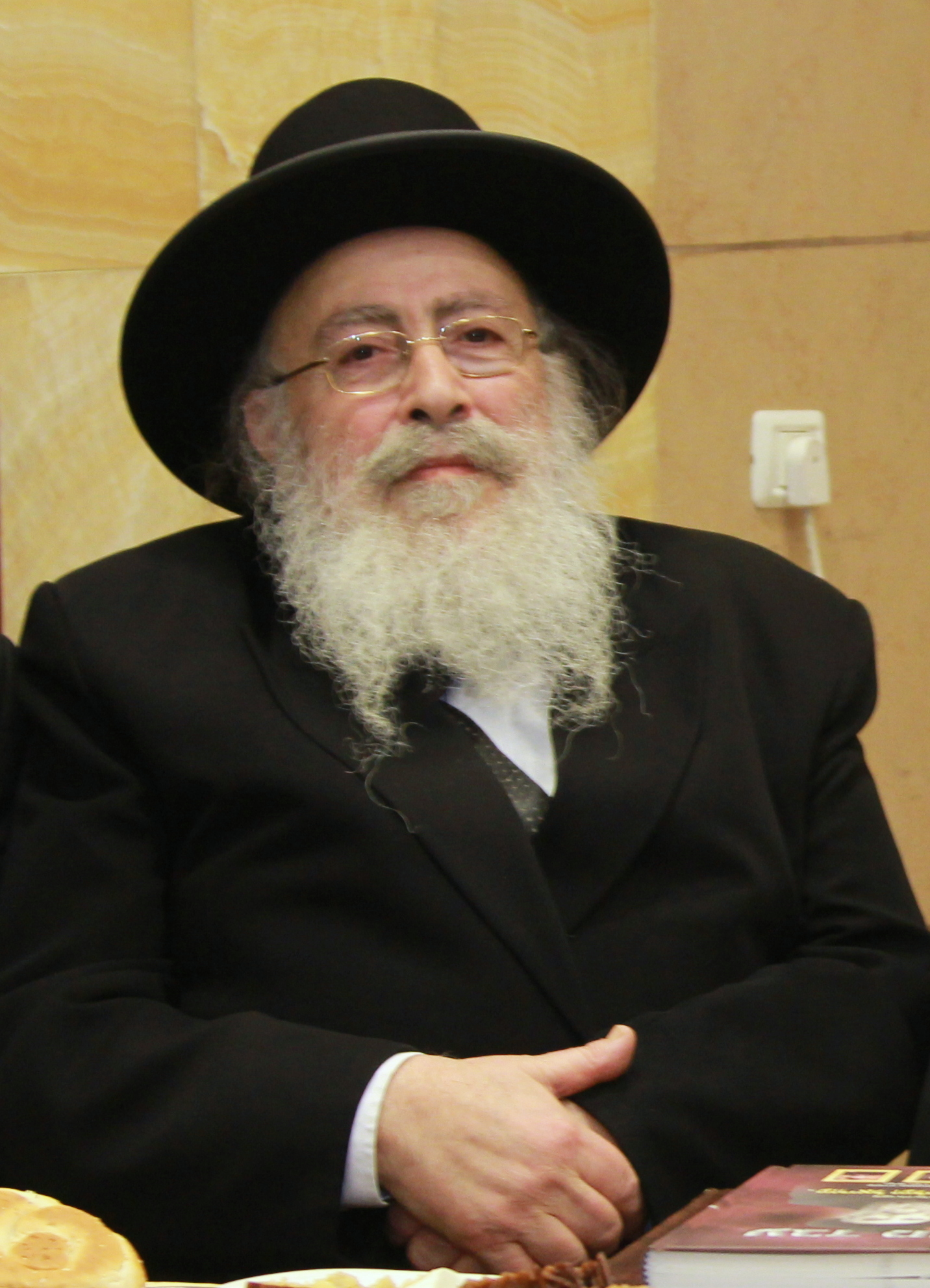
Rabbi Shimon Elituv

Shimon Gad Elituv (Hebrew: שמעון גד אליטוב; 24 February 1937 – 25 January 2023) was an Israeli rabbi and member of the Mateh Binyamin Regional Council, the Chief Rabbinate Council, rabbi of Mevasseret Zion, chairman of the Committee of Rabbis and communities in the Diaspora, as well as member of the Presidium Council of the Alliance of Rabbis in Islamic States and Jerusalem rabbis of Chabad-Lubavitch.

Elituv served for ten years as rabbi of the Halabi community in Buenos Aires, Argentina.
