= Mazel tov =

Jewish phrase for congratulations

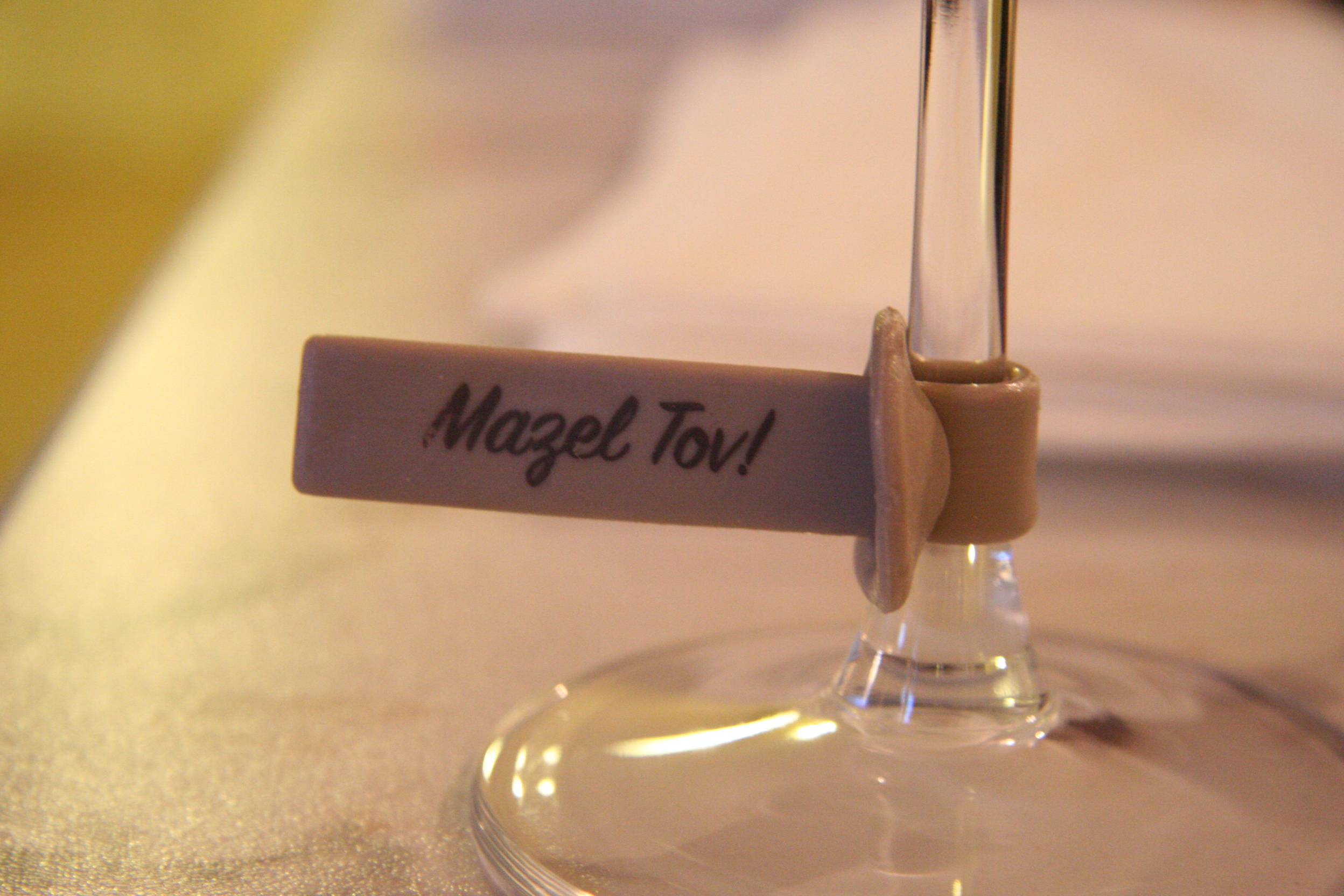
"Mazel Tov!" written on a wine glass tag

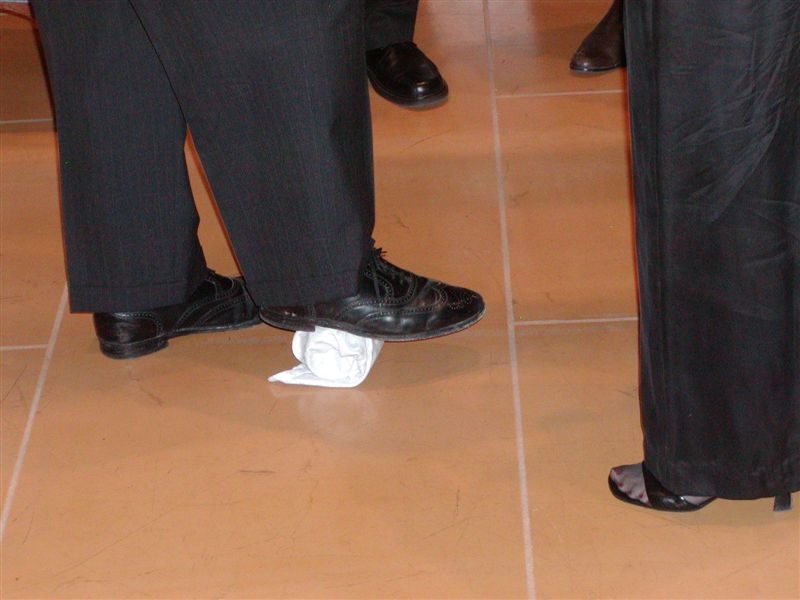
In a Jewish wedding, it is common that after the groom breaks the glass, the guests shout "Mazel tov!"

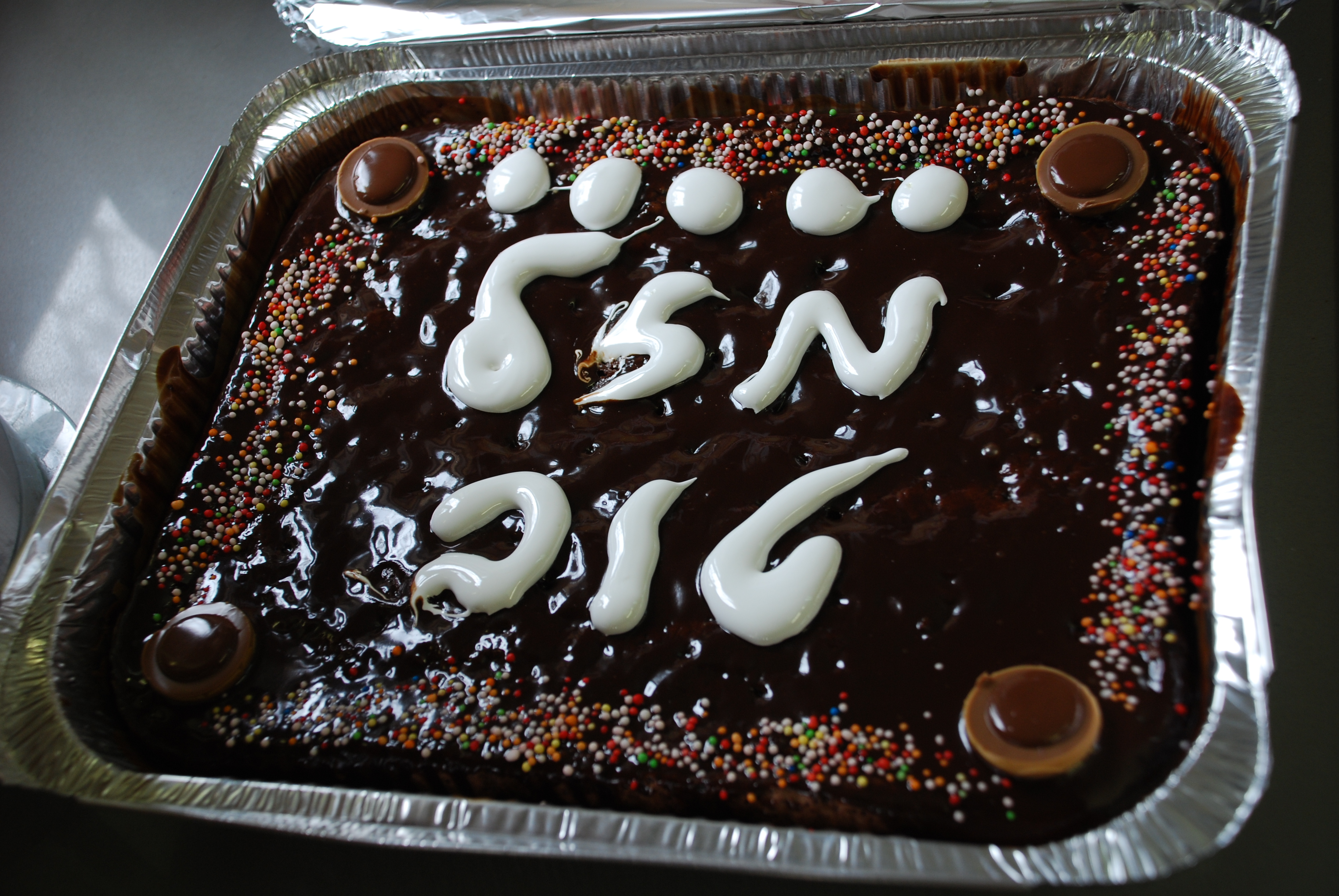
A birthday cake iced with the words mazal tov, often done in Israel. Here the phrase is written in Hebrew cursive.

"Mazel tov" (Yiddish: מזל טוב, romanized: mázl tov) or "mazal tov" (Hebrew: מזל טוב, romanized: mazál tov; lit. "good fortune") is a Jewish phrase used to express congratulations for a happy and significant occasion or event.

== Etymology and pronunciation ==
The word mazel comes from the Biblical Hebrew mazzāl, meaning "constellation" or (in Mishnaic Hebrew) "astrological sign" and may be related to the root נ-ז-ל meaning "to flow down". The phrase mazel tov first appears in Geonic Hebrew, where it means "positive astrological sign" or simply "good fortune." The Medieval Hebrew chant siman tov u-mazel tov, yehe lanu ulkhol yisrael "A good sign, a good omen! Let it happen for us and for all Israel" was used to congratulate, and the phrase itself acquired a congratulatory usage in Yiddish and Hebrew by the early 19th century and was later incorporated into Modern Hebrew. The Yiddish and Ashkenazic pronunciation of mazel has the stress on the first syllable while the Modern Hebrew word mazal has the stress on the last syllable. Mazel-tov is also used as a personal name.

The phrase "mazel tov" is recorded as entering into American English from Yiddish in 1862, pronounced /ˈmɑːzəltɒv, -tɒf/ MAH-zəl-TOV, -TOF. The word mazel was lent to a number of European languages, meaning "luck", such as: German, as Massel; Hungarian, as mázli; Dutch, as mazzel and the verb mazzelen ("to be lucky"). The word tov also entered Dutch as tof or toffe ("nice" or "great") and German as töfte or dufte.

== Usage ==
Mazel tov is literally translated as "good luck" in its meaning as a description, not a wish. The implicit meaning is "good luck has occurred" or "your fortune has been good" and the expression is an acknowledgement of that fact. It is similar in usage to the word "congratulations!" and conveys roughly, "I am pleased this good thing has happened to you!". A common Hebrew phrase for wishing "good luck" is b'hatzlacha (בהצלחה), literally meaning "with success".

Throughout the Jewish world, including the diaspora, "mazel tov!" is a common Jewish expression at events such as a bar or bat mitzvah or a wedding. For example, it is customary at a Jewish wedding for the couple's friends and family to clap and chant or shout "mazel tov!" after the ceremonial breaking of the glass.

In Israel, the phrase is used for all sorts of happy occasions, such as getting a new driver's license, a birthday, or getting a new job.

== See also ==
- Jewish astrology
- Jewish greetings
- List of English words of Yiddish origin
- Siman tov
