= Ashkenazi Synagogue of Istanbul =

Synagogue in Istanbula, Turkey

- Turkish: Aşkenazi Sinagogu
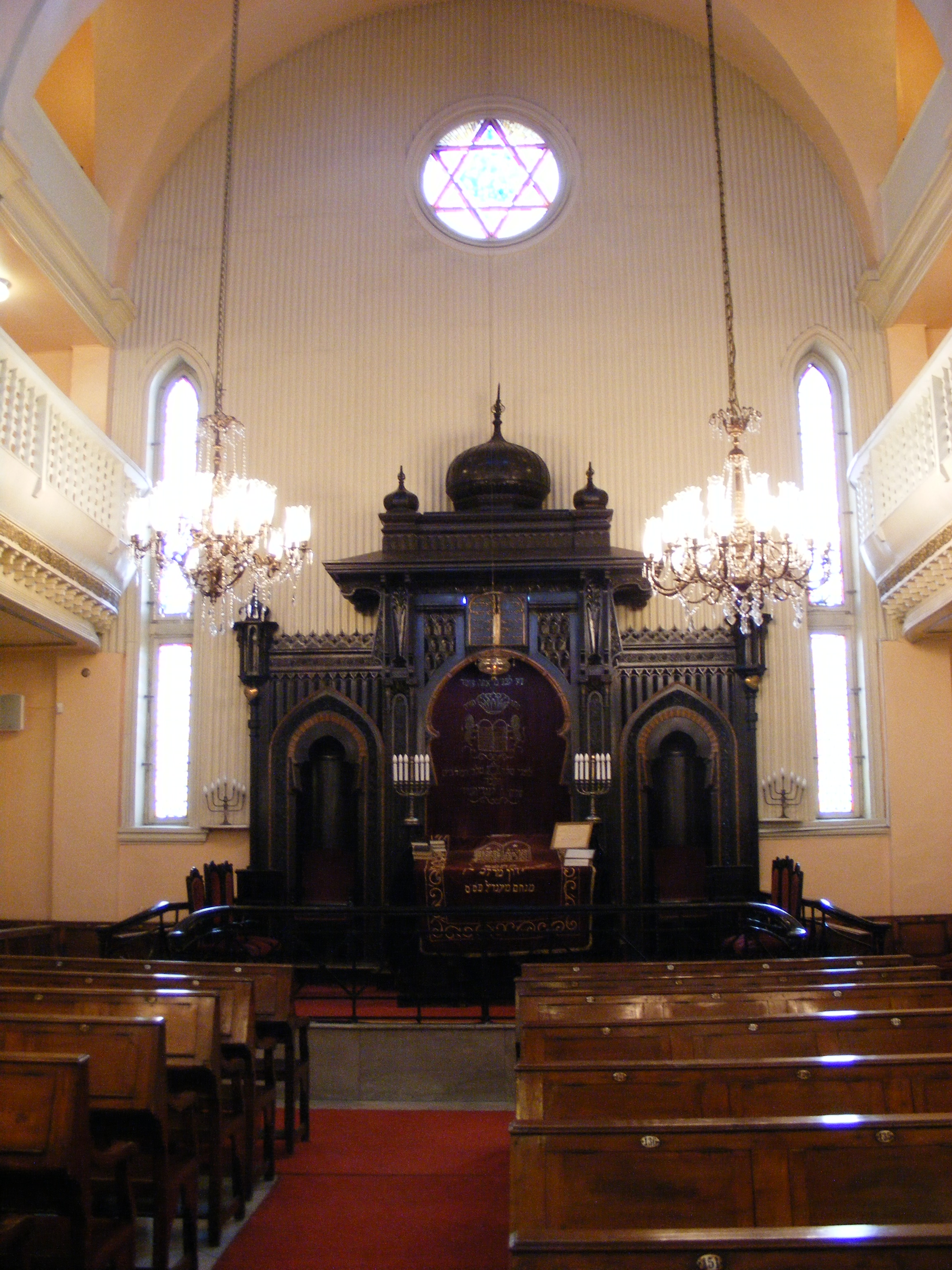
- The interior of the synagogue, in 2008

- Location of the synagogue in Istanbul

Religion
- Affiliation: Orthodox Judaism
- Rite: Nusach Ashkenaz
- Ecclesiastical or organisational status: Synagogue
- Leadership: Rabbi Mendy Chitrik
- Status: Active

Location
- Location: Yüksek Kaldırım Street, Galata Tower, Karaköy, Beyoğlu, Istanbul
- Country: Turkey
- Coordinates: 41°01′31″N 28°58′30″E

Architecture
- Type: Synagogue architecture
- Completed: 1900
- Materials: Brick

The Ashkenazi Synagogue (Turkish: Aşkenazi Sinagogu) is an Orthodox Jewish congregation and synagogue, located near the Galata Tower in Karaköy neighborhood of Beyoğlu in Istanbul, Turkey. The congregation worships in the Ashkenazi rite. It is the only currently active Ashkenazi synagogue in Istanbul open to visits and prayers.

== Design ==
The Ashkenazi Synagogue was built in the early 20th century. Its interior is a single open hall with a large chandelier, and stairs link its sections. The architecture follows European synagogue models, and the windows are stained glass with decorative motifs.

== History ==
The synagogue was founded by Jews of Austrian origin in 1900. The current site of the Ashkenazi Synagogue was originally home to the Österreichischer Temple, also known as the Austrian Temple. This edifice, built in 1831, reflected Austrian architectural sensibilities and was a hub for the Ashkenazi Jewish community in the 19th century. Unfortunately, a catastrophic fire in 1866 destroyed the structure, leaving a void in the spiritual life of the local Jewish population.

It is also the last remaining synagogue from a total of three built by Ashkenazim, as the population of Ashkenazi Jews accounts for four percent of the total Jewish population of Turkey. Visits to the synagogue can be made during weekday mornings and for Shabbat services on Saturday mornings. The synagogue holds weddings, bar mitzvahs and other religious ceremonies in the Ashkenazi tradition. Rabbi Mendy Chitrik, chairman of Alliance of Rabbis in Islamic States, has served as the rabbi of the Ashkenazi Synagogue since 2003.

== Gallery ==
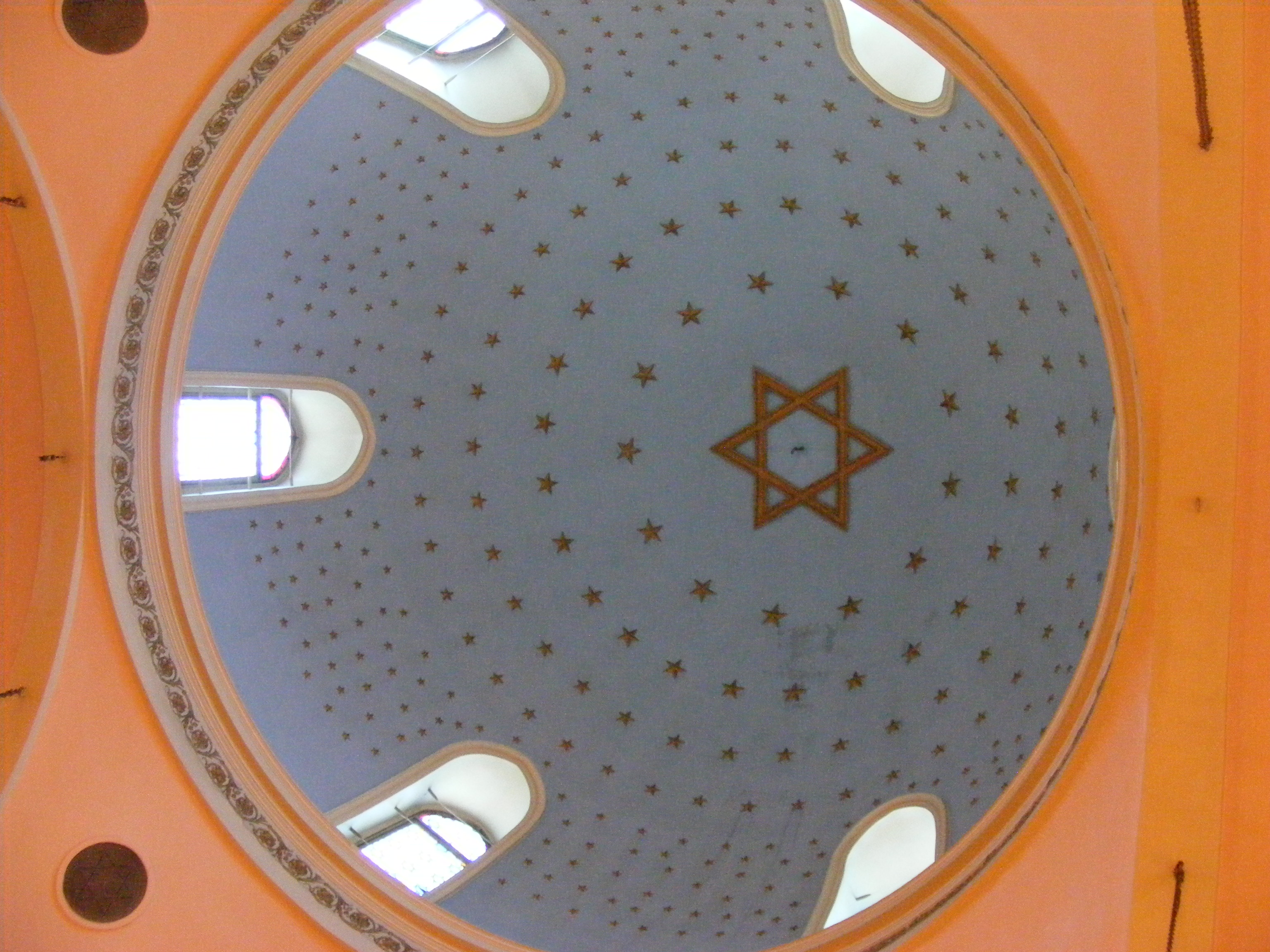
Dome

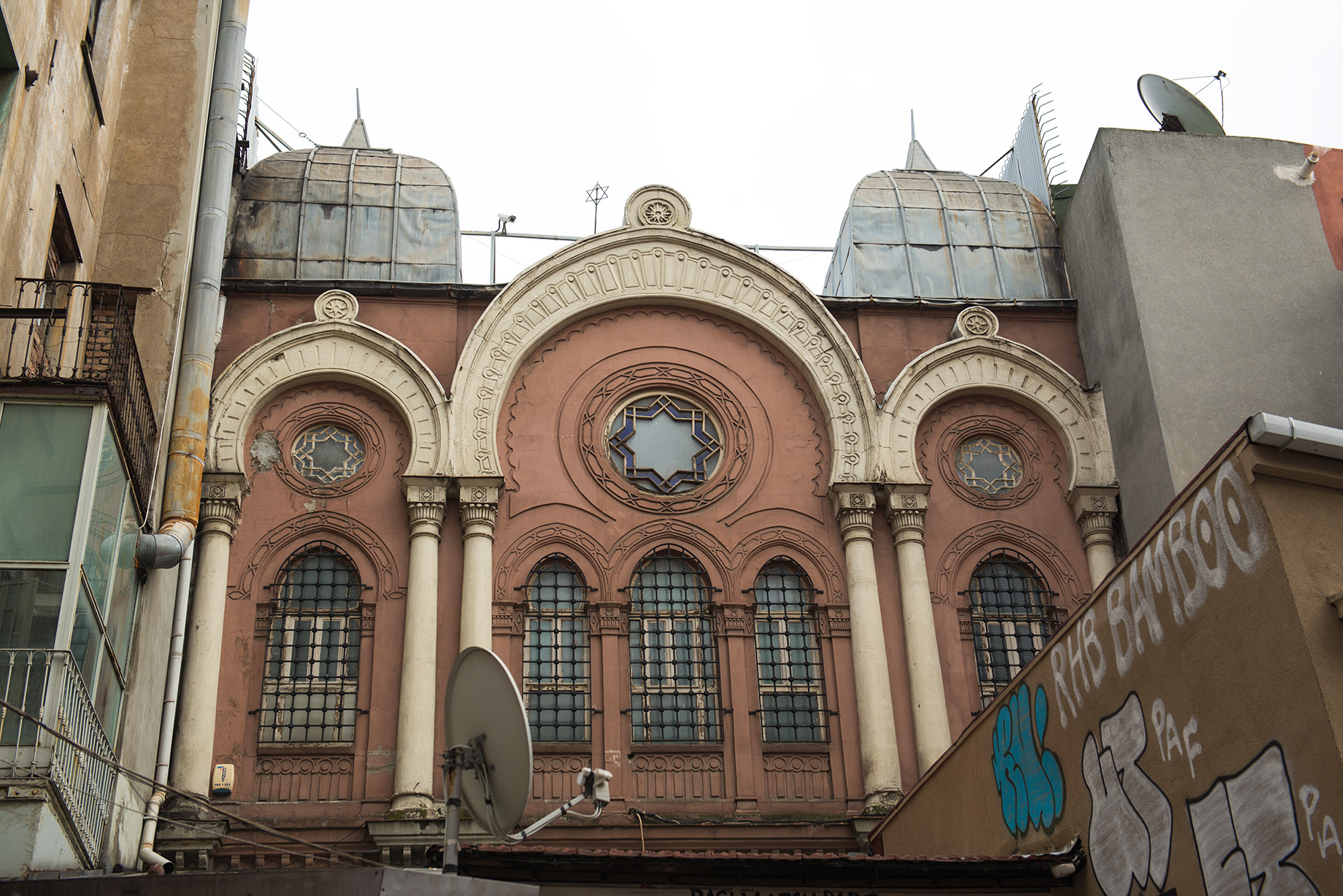
Façade

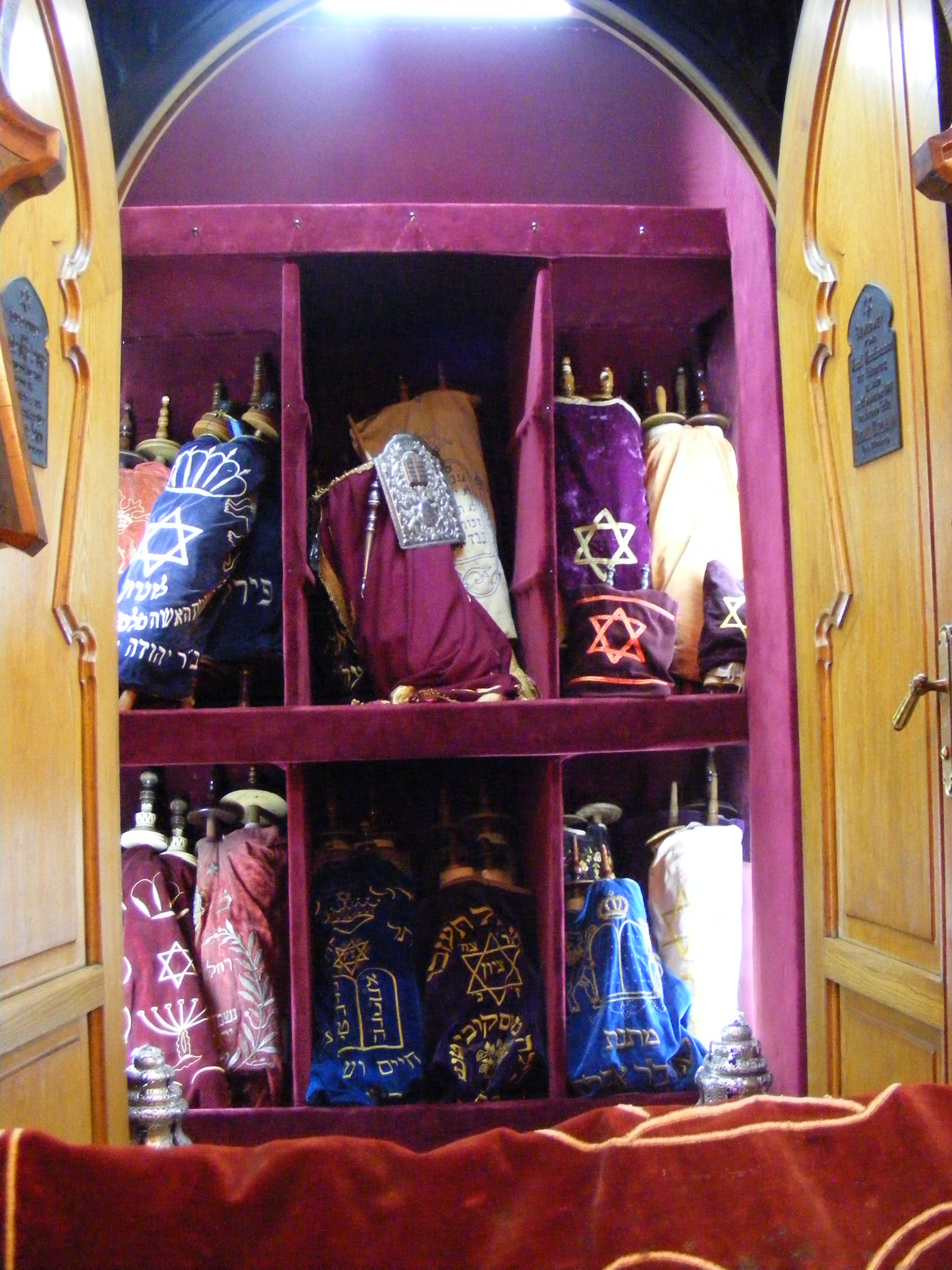
Torahs in the Istanbul Ashkenazi Synagogue

== See also ==
- History of the Jews in Turkey
- List of synagogues in Turkey
