= Haim Bitan =

Tunisian rabbi

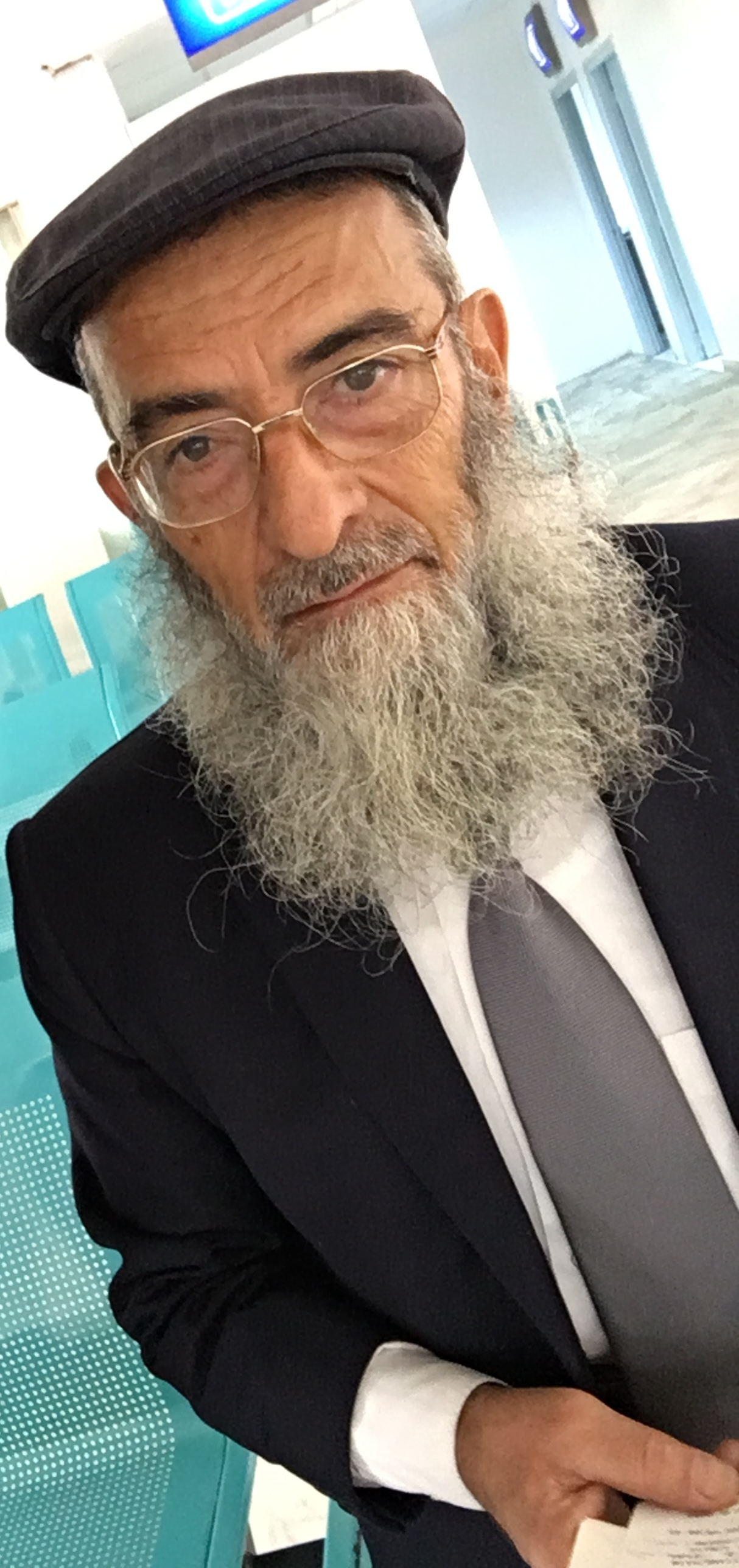
Haim Bitan, Djerba, 2019.

Haim Bitan is a Tunisian rabbi based in Djerba. He currently serves as the chief rabbi of Tunisia.

As of February 2021, serves on the Presidium Council of the Alliance of Rabbis in Islamic States.
