= Alliance of Rabbis in Islamic States =

Union of rabbis serving in Muslim-majority countries

- Founded: September 2019; 6 years ago
- Purpose: Support the activities of rabbis in predominantly Muslim countries
- Members: 40
- Chairman: Mendy Chitrik
- Website: www.rabbisalliance.org

The Alliance of Rabbis in Islamic States (Note: Hebrew: איחוד הרבנים במדינות האסלאם, Arabic: تحالف الحاخامات في الدول الإسلامية) is a union of rabbis serving communities in Muslim-majority countries and regions, established by Rabbi Mendy Chitrik in 2019 with the objective of supporting Jewish life in Muslim countries and regions. It is the first rabbinic association in the Muslim world and serves at least 100,000 Jews throughout various countries. Its activity is approved by Sephardi Chief Rabbi of Israel Yitzchak Yosef.

== Founding and organization ==
The Alliance of Rabbis in Islamic States was founded by Rabbi Mendy Chitrik in September 2019. Having spent over twenty years in Turkey, he recognized a chance to assist Jews residing in predominantly Muslim countries, where obtaining aid from organizations based in the United States or Israel could occasionally present challenges. He is the head Rabbi of Istanbul's Ashkenazi Jewish community, and serves as the alliance's chairman. It is the first rabbinic association in the Muslim world.

The establishment of the alliance aims to foster connections and provide support for Ashkenazi, Sephardi, Chabad, and communal rabbis who serve Jewish communities in predominantly Muslim nations. As of March 2021, ARIS had formed a network of rabbis spanning 14 mostly Muslim-majority member countries including Albania, Azerbaijan, Morocco, Nigeria, Turkey, Tunisia, Iran, Kazakhstan, Kosovo, Kyrgyzstan, UAE, Uganda, and Uzbekistan. The organization supports around 100,000 Jews in these countries. Additionally, it includes rabbis serving Jewish communities in other regions with Muslim majorities, such as North Cyprus and the Russian republics of Tatarstan and Bashkortostan.

ARIS' first summit was held in Istanbul on December 22, 2021. The organization was received by Turkish president Recep Tayyip Erdoğan at the Presidential Complex the next day. In the meeting, Erdoğan told ARIS that “the ties with Israel are vital for regional stability.”

ARIS' activity is approved by Chief Rabbi of Israel Grand Rabbi Yitzchak Yosef and follows his Halachic directives.

=== Presidium council ===
The Presidium Council of the union consists of:

- Rabbi Shimon Elituv, representing the Council of the Chief Rabbinate of Israel
- Rabbi Gad Bouskila, rabbi of the Moroccan Congregation Netivot Yisrael in Brooklyn, New York
- Rabbi Rafael David Banon, Beth Din of Montreal and leader of its Moroccan community
- Rabbi Haim Bitan, chief rabbi of Tunisia
- Rabbi Ishak Haleva, (former) Chief Rabbi of Turkey (late as of 14 January 2025)
- Rabbi Avraham Hamra, the last chief rabbi of Syria was a member of the Presidium Council until his death in 2021.

=== Executive board ===
- Rabbi Levi Bannon, Chabad rabbi in Morocco
- Rabbi Mendy Chitrik, Istanbul-based Ashkenazi rabbi
- Rabbi Yeshaya Cohen, Chief Rabbi of Kazakhstan
- Rabbi Levi Duchman, UAE-based rabbi
- Rabbi Shneor Segal, Chief Rabbi of Azerbaijan
- Rabbi Yisrael Uzan, Chief Rabbi of Nigeria

== Activities ==
ARIS aims to advise governments and other organizations on all matters of coexistence, tolerance, and peace. It supports the work of rabbis and community leaders as well as continues Jewish life and culture in Muslim countries. The organization also aims to take care of isolated individuals and communities in Muslim world. Rabbis are involved in calls for interfaith and peaceful living with Muslims.

In March 2021, preparing for the upcoming Passover holiday, ARIS provided matzah to Jews residing in politically precarious locations, such as Syria, Afghanistan, Libya, and Lebanon. The organization also distributed thousands of seder boxes, containing essential items for the Passover celebration, to Jewish communities across the Muslim world, including Turkey, Azerbaijan, Uzbekistan, Nigeria. In May, ARIS provided humanitarian aid for needy families in Nigeria prior to Ramadan. In September, the organization coordinated the delivery of 500 etrogs and several packages of myrtle to the Iranian Jewish community for use in the “four species” tradition on Sukkot.

ARIS was involved in the evacuation of Zablon Simintov from Kabul, Afghanistan in September 2021. They were also involved in the efforts to evacuate Simintov's distant cousin, Tova Moradi, to Albania.
