= Mendy Chitrik =

Chairman of the Alliance of Rabbis in Islamic States and the Ashkenazi Rabbi of Turkey

Rabbi Mendy Chitrik
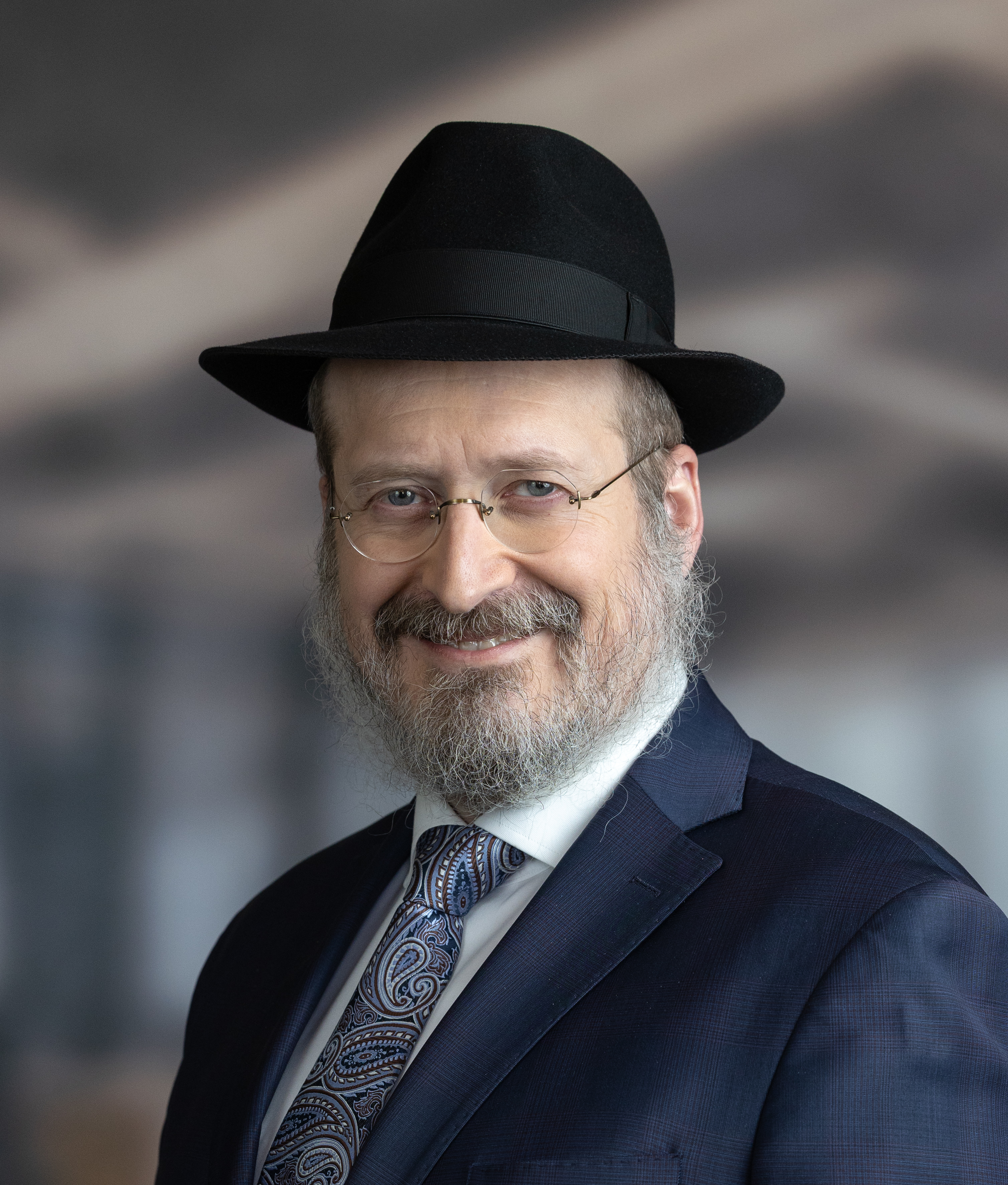

Personal life
- Born: Menachem Mendel Chitrik; March 31, 1977 (age 49)
- Spouse: Chaya Chitrik
- Children: 8

Religious life
- Religion: Judaism
- Denomination: Orthodox Judaism (Chabad)

Jewish leader
- Position: Rabbi of the Ashkenazi Jewish community of Turkey
- Synagogue: Ashkenazi Synagogue of Istanbul
- Organisation: Alliance of Rabbis in Islamic States
- Other: Chairman of the Alliance of Rabbis in Islamic States

Rabbi Menachem Mendel Chitrik (Hebrew: מנדי חיטריק; born March 31, 1977), better known as Rabbi Mendy Chitrik, is the Rabbi of the Ashkenazi Jewish community of Turkey since 2003 and Chairman of the Alliance of Rabbis in Islamic States since 2019.

== Biography ==
Rabbi Chitrik grew up in Safed, in a Chassidic family; his great grandfather was Rabbi Yehuda Chitrik. He studied in the Chabad Yeshiva system, at the Rabbinical College of America (Bachelor of Religious Studies) and in Colel Tzemach Tzedek in Jerusalem. He received his rabbinical ordination from Rabbi Zalman Nechemia Goldberg of Jerusalem, the Sefardi Chief Rabbis of Israel Mordechai Eliyahu and Eliyahu Bakshi-Doron, and from his maternal grandfather Chief Rabbi David Moshe Lieberman, the Chief Rabbi of Antwerp.

== Public life ==
Chitrik moved to Istanbul, Turkey in 2001, and in 2003 became the Rabbi of the Ashkenazi Jewish community of Turkey, a small and ancient community that has existed for centuries and predates the much larger and more famous Sephardi community whose members settled in Istanbul mostly after the expulsion from Spain.

In 2019, Chitrik became chairman of the Alliance of Rabbis in Islamic States (ARIS) upon its founding. Following the Taliban takeover of Afghanistan in 2021, Chitrik helped secure a Turkish transit visa for Zebulon Simentov, often described as Afghanistan's last remaining Jew, and received him upon his arrival in Istanbul. In December 2021, ARIS held its first summit in Istanbul; participants were subsequently received by Turkish president Recep Tayyip Erdoğan at the Presidential Complex in Ankara.

He previously served as a permanent member of the Standing Committee of the Conference of European Rabbis (CER) 2014-2020 until his appointment as chairman of the Alliance of Rabbis in Islamic States. In 2025 he was selected to be a council member of Voice of the People and is a member of the RCA, Rabbinical Centre of Europe and other rabbinical bodies. Chitrik belongs to the Chabad movement; he has also been outspoken against Chabad Messianism, and has publicly stated that the Lubavitcher Rebbe cannot be the Messiah, since he died in 1994.

Chitrik is involved with interfaith activities focusing on Jewish-Muslim relations. He travels extensively and writes about the history of Jews in Anatolia. His travels across Anatolia in Summer of 2021 were widely reported.

As part of his responsibilities in the Jewish community of Turkey, Chitrik leads the KTR, Turkey's Chief Rabbinate's Kashrut department for exports (Denet Gida).

He was also responsible for the Kosher standards at the Emirati Agency for Kosher Certification (EAKC). He is also a field representative for the OU and other major kosher organizations, a shochet, Sofer and a mohel.

Ahead of the 2022 FIFA World Cup in Qatar, Chitrik worked with Qatari officials on arrangements for kosher food and travelled to Doha to inspect the kosher kitchen used during the tournament.

Following the 2023 Turkey–Syria earthquakes, Chitrik travelled to Antakya with representatives of the Turkish Jewish community and helped remove eight Torah scrolls from the city's damaged synagogue. The remaining members of Antakya's Jewish community and the synagogue's Torah scrolls were subsequently relocated temporarily to Istanbul.

In September 2025, Chitrik joined a Jewish goodwill delegation to Damascus that met representatives of the new Syrian government and visited Jewish heritage sites. During the visit, he led a prayer service at the historic Elfaranje Synagogue and participated in a prayer quorum at the tomb of the 16th-century rabbi and kabbalist Hayyim Vital.

In July 2026, Chitrik led an ARIS delegation that was received by Qatar's emir, Tamim bin Hamad Al Thani, at Lusail Palace. The delegation travelled to Doha to offer condolences following the death of the Father Emir, Hamad bin Khalifa Al Thani.

Chitrik and his wife Chaya (nee Schochet, married 2000) have been involved in strengthening the Jewish life and Jewish learning in Istanbul through classes, large scale Jewish holiday events, one-on-one counseling, daily prayer services. With their eight children, they run an open house in Istanbul, where local residents and travelers from all over the world come on Shabbat and holidays.

Some of the activities have been criticized by the more secular elements of the community.

== Publications ==
Chitrik has published several books on Jewish life in Turkish, and was involved in publishing a book on Turkish-Sephardic customs. Chitrik is fluent in six languages, including Ladino. He lectures on the history and customs of Turkish Jews.

Chitrik has written opinion essays on Jewish–Muslim relations, interfaith coexistence and Jewish life in Muslim-majority countries for publications including The Jerusalem Post, Euronews, Religion News Service and eJewishPhilanthropy. He has also contributed essays on Jewish history, travel and Jewish–Muslim relations to The Times of Israel blog platform.

== Podcast ==
In October 2021, Chitrik started a podcast with his cousin Rabbi Eliezer Zalmanov of Munster, Indiana titled "Chatting Rabbis," an unscripted weekly conversation about the many issues facing their families, their communities, and the Jewish world at large.
