= Zablon Simintov =

Second-last Jew to leave Afghanistan in 2021

- زابلون سیمینتوف
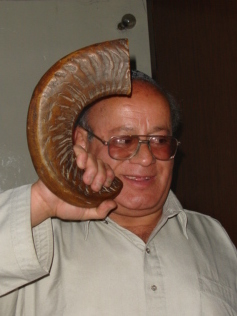
- Simintov holding a Shofar in March 2005
- Born: 1959 (age 66–67); Herat, Kingdom of Afghanistan
- Other name: Zebulon Simentov
- Citizenship: Afghan (until 2024); Israeli (since 2024)
- Known for: Being the last Jew in Afghanistan
- Children: 2

Zablon Simintov or Zebulon Simentov (Note: From סימן טוב (siman tov), lit. 'A good sign'; also romanized as Zebulon Simentov, Zabolon Simentov, or Zabolon Simantov.) (Dari/Pashto: زابلون سیمینتوف; Hebrew: זבולון סימן-טוב; born 1959) is an Afghan Jewish former carpet trader and restaurateur. Between 2005 and his evacuation from the country in 2021, he was widely believed to be the only Jew still living in Afghanistan. He was also the caretaker of and lived in the Kabul synagogue, the only synagogue in the Afghan capital city Kabul. On 7 September 2021, shortly after the Taliban takeover, he left Afghanistan with the help of a private security company that had been organized by Israeli-American businessman Mordechai Kahana and American rabbi Moshe Margaretten from the Tzedek Association.

== Early life ==
Simintov was born into an Orthodox Jewish family in the city of Herat in 1959, where he spent most of his early life until his eventual relocation to Kabul. His residence was severely damaged during the Taliban's rise to power in the Second Afghan Civil War, which forced him to move into the city's only synagogue. Despite that most Jews had already departed from the country by this time, with the majority settling down in Israel, Simintov did not permanently relocate; he briefly lived in Turkmenistan but returned to Kabul in 1998, by which time the Taliban had officially established the Islamic Emirate of Afghanistan. Simintov was detained, jailed and abused several times by Taliban militants during this period, and was also extorted by the group at his carpet warehouse in 2001. Simintov is also known during this time period for his heavily publicized feud with Yitzhak Levi (Ishaq Levi), another Afghan Jew; it has been claimed that the two were expelled from a Taliban-led jail due to their constant fighting.

== Later life ==
Simintov lived at the Kabul synagogue alongside Ishaq Levin, who was thought to be the only other Jew remaining in Afghanistan, until the latter's death on 26 January 2005 at around 80 years of age. The story of Simintov and Levin as the supposed only remaining Jews in Afghanistan served as the basis for a British play, as well as the Belgian-French documentary Cabal in Kabul. Simintov deprecated Levin in an interview with British journalist Martin Fletcher; while Levin had initially welcomed Simintov into Kabul's synagogue following the latter's return from Turkmenistan in 1998, the two grew to greatly dislike each other due to personal feuds and religious disagreements.

Jason Everman and Zablon Simintov in the Kabul Synagogue, 2005

In an interview with the Jewish American magazine Tablet, Simintov highlighted the difficulties of being the isolated and only remaining practitioner of Judaism in Afghanistan. He had to obtain special permission from the nearest rabbi in Tashkent, Uzbekistan, to slaughter his own livestock for meat in accordance with Jewish dietary laws, as this can normally be done only by a specially trained Jewish butcher. Simintov received regular shipments of special kosher supplies on Passover from Afghan Jews living in New York. He has stated that he wore his kippah only in private and was hesitant to allow visitors into the synagogue in Kabul that he had been maintaining.

Simintov lived alone in a small synagogue room and received donations from Jewish groups abroad, as well as from sympathetic Muslim locals. His wife, from whom he is estranged, and his two daughters reside in Israel. When asked during an interview whether he would also emigrate to Israel and join his family, Simintov retorted, "Go to Israel? What business do I have there? Why should I leave?" In a 2007 video interview with Al Jazeera, Simintov suggested that he might be interested in moving to Israel to join his two daughters. However, he again expressed reluctance to leave in a 2019 interview, stating: "I don't speak Hebrew. I am an Afghan." Simintov has also said that he knows former Afghan President Ashraf Ghani personally.

In November 2013, Simintov announced that he would close his kebab restaurant in March 2014 due to declining business after the reduction of American and NATO forces in Afghanistan.

== Taliban takeover and Simintov's exit ==
In April 2021, Simintov announced that he would leave Afghanistan for Israel after the High Holy Days in September, fearing a resurgence of groups such as the Taliban after the US military began withdrawing. On 15 August 2021, three weeks before the first of the High Holy Days, the Taliban captured Kabul. Simintov remained in Kabul despite having been given chances to leave including by businessman Mordechai Kahana, who offered to pay for a private airplane to take him to Israel. Rabbi Mendy Chitrik of the Alliance of Rabbis in Islamic States involved the Turkish government in the efforts to rescue him from Kabul. While he insisted he would stay to take care of the country's last synagogue, it was later reported that his decision may have been influenced by his refusal to give his wife a get (a Jewish religious divorce). Get refusal can lead to a prison sentence in Israel. Another report stated he refused to leave as he owes money to his neighbours and wished to honour his debts.

Eventually, he left in September 2021 with several neighbouring families, stating that it was not the Taliban, but the possibility of other, more radical Islamist groups such as IS-KP taking him hostage, which resulted in his exit from the country. After leaving Afghanistan, Simintov granted his wife a divorce. Simintov was initially taken to Pakistan, where he lived for a short time before being taken to Turkey as a stopover on the way to Israel. However, he decided to remain in Istanbul, refusing attempts to convince him to proceed to Israel. However, as he became increasingly ill and needed a wheelchair, he found it a challenge to continue living there and decided to move to Israel. He arrived in Israel in November 2024, settling in Ashdod.

== See also ==
- History of the Jews in Afghanistan
- Bukharan Jews
- Endling
