= Kabul synagogue =

Abandoned synagogue in Kabul, Afghanistan

- Jason Everman and Zablon Simintov in the Kabul Synagogue, 2005

- Location of the former synagogue in Kabul

Religion
- Affiliation: Judaism (former)
- Ecclesiastical or organisational status: Synagogue (1966–1990)
- Status: Abandoned

Location
- Location: Flower Street, Kabul
- Country: Afghanistan
- Coordinates: 34°31′53″N 69°10′22″E

Architecture
- Completed: 1966

The Kabul synagogue, known by locals as the Jewish Mosque, is an abandoned Jewish congregation and synagogue in Kabul, Afghanistan. The synagogue was completed in 1966, when Afghanistan's Jewish population numbered in the thousands.

The synagogue fell into disrepair over the latter half of the 20th century due to the emigration of the country's Jewish population, damage during the Second Afghan Civil War, and persecution under the Taliban. In the early years of the 21st century, the synagogue was home to Zablon Simintov and Yitzhak Levin, believed to be the last two Jews in Afghanistan, who served as the synagogue's caretakers. Levin died at the synagogue in 2005, and Simintov was evacuated from Afghanistan in 2021 after the Taliban takeover of the country.

== History ==
In 1948, Afghanistan's Jewish population numbered approximately 5,000 people. In the early 1960s, the community built a synagogue around a small courtyard on Flower Street in downtown Kabul. The two-story building has two sanctuaries and was dedicated on March 29, 1966. The synagogue's door was made of corrugated iron and laden with Stars of David.

There is also a Jewish cemetery on the outskirts of the city where 1,000 people are reportedly buried.

By the 1960s, much of the Jewish population had emigrated for better economic opportunities in the United States and Israel. At the time, Afghanistan was the only country in the Muslim world that allowed Jews to retain their citizenship upon emigrating.

=== Late 20th century ===
The country's last rabbi fled in 1988, and the last formal prayer services were held at the synagogue in 1990. In the mid-1990s, Zablon Simintov moved into the synagogue, by then Kabul's only functioning synagogue, after his home was damaged during the Second Afghan Civil War. The Taliban had come to power in 1996, and the synagogue had been deserted and left in disrepair. The civil war left much of Kabul in ruins, and essentially all of the country's Jews had left Afghanistan. After a brief stint in Turkmenistan, Simintov returned to Kabul in 1998 or 1999 and was the synagogue's live-in caretaker. He also operated a carpet business out of the synagogue.

The Taliban considered the synagogue un-Islamic and as such, ransacked it. The regime frequently arrested Simintov and fellow resident Yitzhak Levin as part of the Islamist government's effort to remove vestiges of non-Islamic influences from Afghanistan. In 1998, the Taliban confiscated almost all of the synagogue's items of value, such as a silver yad for reading the Torah and four silver bells. An unidentified Taliban commander, who was reportedly later held at Guantánamo Bay detention camp, confiscated the synagogue's Torah scroll estimated to be 400 years old.

Simintov and Levin argued frequently about who was the rightful owner of the synagogue, and they lived in different wings of the synagogue. Each would complain to the Taliban about the other, to the point that the Taliban imprisoned both men.

=== 21st century ===
To disguise the synagogue from the outside, Simintov operated a kebab restaurant from the building called Balkh Bastan (Ancient Balkh) beginning in 2009. Levin lived downstairs until his death in 2005, when Simintov became the last Jew believed to be in Afghanistan and the synagogue's only live-in caretaker. Every Shabbat, Simintov would read the Torah from the synagogue's bimah. After the fall of Kabul in 2021, Simintov left Afghanistan. By then, the synagogue was in a dilapidated state.

== See also ==
- History of the Jews in Afghanistan
- List of former synagogues in Afghanistan
