= Siman tov =

Siman tov (Hebrew: סימן טוב, lit. 'a good sign' or 'good tidings') is a Hebrew-language congratulatory expression, and also serves as a Jewish given name or surname. Notable people with the name under various transliterations include:

- Maya Simantov (born 1982), Israeli singer and songwriter
- Rita Gabbai-Simantov (born 1935), Greek-Jewish poet and writer
- Siman-Tov Ganeh (1924–1968), Israeli soldier
- Siman-Tov Brothers, founders of Lili Diamonds
- Siman Tov family, Israeli family killed in the October 7 attacks
- Zablon Simintov (born 1959), second-last Jew in Afghanistan until 2021

== See also ==
- Bar Siman Tov
