= Jewish Community Center of UAE =

Jewish community center in the United Arab Emirates

- Logo of the Jewish Community Center of UAE
- Formation: 2019
- Founder: Naum Koen
- Type: Jewish Community
- Region served: United Arab Emirates
- Services: Kosher food, Jewish education, synagogue, and other Jewish communal services
- Rabbi: Levi Duchman
- President: Vacant
- Website: jewishuae.com

The Jewish Community Center of UAE is a Jewish community center in the United Arab Emirates led by Chabad Rabbi Levi Duchman.

== History ==
Since the formation of the United Arab Emirates (UAE) in 1971, a small Jewish community grew and lived in the UAE for many years, but was mostly living in the shadows. As improved relations between Israel and the UAE, Jews in the UAE started to openly pray and practice Judaism and established the Jewish Community Center of UAE.

The president of the center, Solly Wolf, died on February 4, 2025.

== Synagogue ==
The JCC (Jewish Community Center) of the UAE, is led by Chabad Rabbi Levi Duchman. A Jewish benediction is recited to the president of the UAE Sheikh Khalifa bin Zayed al Nahyan as well as to the rest of the rulers of the UAE during Shabbat.

== Kosher food ==
The supply of 1,000 kosher chickens per week is provided to the community by local Kosher Shechita. In May 2020, it was reported that the JCC of UAE has imported the largest meat shipment in the history of the community.

Following the normalization agreement, Duchman opened an upscale kosher restaurant in the Burj Khalifa tower in Dubai, serving Mediterranean fare and wine and sporting a "sleek Asian decor".

== Jewish Education in the UAE ==
In place of the original Talmud Torah established in 2020, the Jewish community in Dubai has since expanded its educational infrastructure with the opening of Mini Miracles, an early childhood education center founded under the leadership of Rabbi Levi Duchman. Located in Dubai, Mini Miracles serves as the first nursery in the Gulf region to incorporate Jewish vales, offering a bilingual curriculum in English and Hebrew and including Jewish values, holidays, and traditions into its programming. The nursery caters to children from 18 months to 4 years old and emphasizes both academic development and Jewish identity in a nurturing, pluralistic environment.

For the 2023–24 academic year, Mini Miracles offers a variety of programs beyond early childhood care, including a Sunday Kid's Club (Hebrew school held on Sundays), Friday Club, Bar and Bat Mitzvah preparation, private tutoring, and a seasonal Camp Gan Izzy. Enrollment has grown from just a few children at its launch to approximately 45 pupils, with plans underway to open a new campus in Abu Dhabi.

Mini Miracles is part of Rabbi Duchman's broader vision to support Jewish life in the UAE. He also oversees Sunday and after-school Hebrew and Jewish education programs for students attending non-Jewish schools, aiming to strengthen Jewish identity and literacy within the community.

== Public sukkah ==
For the Sukkot holiday in October 2020, Duchman erected a public sukkah next to the Burj Khalifa tower in Dubai.

== See also ==
- Zvi Kogan, Israeli-Moldovan Chabad rabbi who worked at the center and was killed in the United Arab Emirates
- History of the Jews in the United Arab Emirates
