= History of the Jews in the United Arab Emirates =

The history of the Jews in the United Arab Emirates started in 1165. As of 2025, there are about 7,000 Jewish people in the UAE: 6,000 in Dubai and 600 in Abu Dhabi.

The Abraham Accords normalized relations between Israel and the UAE in 2020. The first officially-licensed synagogue opened in Abu Dhabi in 2023. There are three synagogues across the UAE.

The Ministry of Tolerance led to the creation of the National Tolerance Programme and official recognition of the Jewish community in the UAE.

== Early history ==
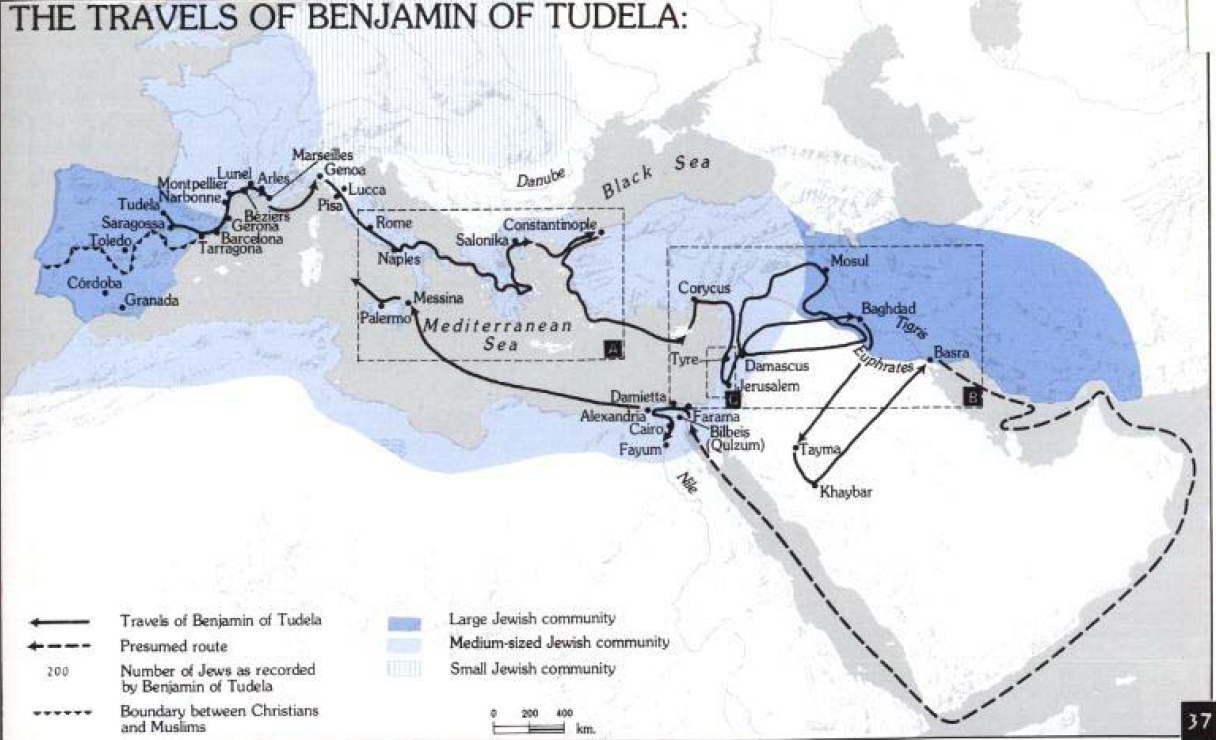
Map of the route.

A historical journey to visit far-flung Jewish communities was undertaken by Rabbi Benjamin of Tudela from 1165 to 1173 that crossed and tracked some of the areas that are today in the United Arab Emirates, which had also been under the control of the Persians. His trek began as a pilgrimage to the Holy Land. He may have hoped to settle there, but there is controversy about the reasons for his travels. It has been suggested he may have had a commercial motive as well as a religious one. On the other hand, he may have intended to catalogue the Jewish communities on the route to the Holy Land so as to provide a guide to where hospitality may have been found for Jews travelling to the Holy Land. He took the "long road", stopping frequently, meeting people, visiting places, describing occupations and giving a demographic count of Jews in every town and country.

One of the known towns that Benjamin of Tudela reported as having a Jewish community was in a place called "Kis", located in Ras al-Khaimah, one of the seven emirates of the UAE. Modern Ras al-Khaimah covers an area of 656 square miles (1,700 km^{2}) in the northern part of the Arabian Peninsula.

== Modern history ==
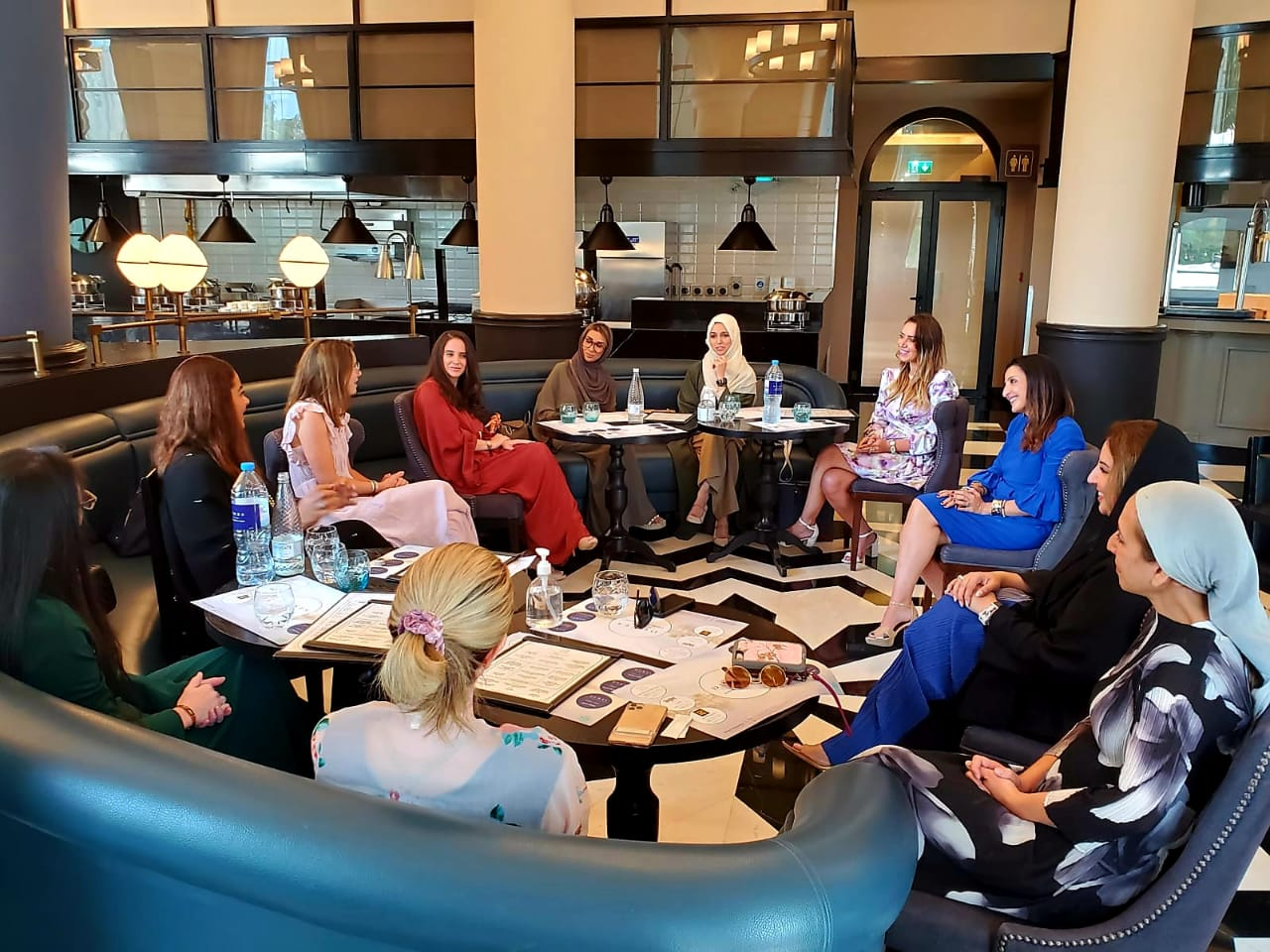
Gulf-Israel Women's Forum, Dubai, October 2020

Since the formation of the United Arab Emirates (UAE) in 1971, a small Jewish community has grown in the UAE. It includes Jews who call the United Arab Emirates home, as well as Jews who moved to the UAE because they are involved in business and commerce in Dubai and Abu Dhabi. In 2019, Rabbi Marc Schneier reported varying estimates of 150 families or 2,000–3,000 Jews living in the UAE. As of 2022, Judaism is experiencing a revival in the Emirates.

=== Leadership ===
Rabbi Yehuda Sarna is the Chief Rabbi of the UAE. Ross Kriel is the President of the Jewish Council of the Emirates. Rabbi Elie Abadie is Senior Rabbi of the UAE. Rabbi Levi Duchman, rabbi of the JCC in Dubai, has been appointed Chief Chabad Rabbi to the UAE. He is the only rabbi resident in the country.

=== Synagogue ===
A synagogue in Abu Dhabi is housed in the Abrahamic Family House, an interfaith complex dedicated to the three Abrahamic religions. The complex, designed by Sir David Adjaye, was completed and opened to the public in early 2023.

In 2019, the United Arab Emirates government announced a Year of Tolerance, officially recognizing the existence of Jews in the UAE. A Jewish benediction was recited to the President of the UAE, Sheikh Khalifa bin Zayed al Nahyan, as well as to the rest of the Emirates' rulers during Shabbat.

=== Kosher food ===
The first kosher food service in the United Arab Emirates was established by Elli Kriel, a Jewish community member and resident in the UAE, in 2019. Serving kosher food from her home, "Elli's Kosher Kitchen" became highly popular among tourists, hotels and conferences organizers. The normalization of relations between the UAE and Israel boosted Elli's Kosher Kitchen to new heights, resulting in a partnership with Aloft Abu Dhabi and Abu Dhabi National Exhibition Center (ADNEC), from which a production kitchen has been founded under the certification of the Orthodox Union (OU). Elli's Kosher Kitchen continues to deliver to tourists and provide catering for the hospitality sector, as well as for events, conferences and exhibitions.

Kosher Arabia, a joint venture between Emirates Flight Catering (EKFC) and CCL Holdings, was launched in April 2021. It offers kosher meals to customers in the aviation, hospitality and events sectors, including Dubai Expo 2020, across the Gulf and is the region's first exporter of kosher food.

The UAE's first Kosher Certification has been founded by Rabbi Levi Duchman and is the first to be fully licensed by the UAE authorities. The Emirates Agency for Kosher Certification (EAKC) is the first legal entity responsible for the assessment of foods, products, processes and services to ensure compliance with Orthodox Jewish dietary laws. Armani/Kaf in Dubai's Burj Khalifa is the UAE's first Glatt Kosher Restaurant, supervised under the EAKC.

One thousand EAKC-certified kosher chickens per week are provided to the community by local Shechita. In May 2020, it was reported that the JCC of the UAE has imported the largest kosher meat shipment in the history of the community.

=== Talmud Torah School ===
A new Talmud Torah was reported in 2020 to have been recently established, and now has around 40 pupils.

=== Chabad ===
On October 23, 2020, Chabad-Lubavitch appointed Rabbi Levi Duchman as the Chabad Shaliach to the UAE, making him the first Chabad Shaliach to a Gulf country. He is the Chabad Rabbi in Abu Dhabi and Rabbi of the Beit Tefillah Synagogue. Solly Wolf is the head and the president of the JCC, a Chabad-linked organization based in Dubai.

On November 21, 2024, Israeli-Moldovan Rabbi Zvi Kogan, a Chabad-Lubavitch emissary to the United Arab Emirates, was abducted and later found killed in Al Ain. Three suspects were arrested by Emirati officials, they were accused of Kogan's murder and sentenced to death. Kogan had been working with Duchman to establish Jewish educational initiatives and expand access to kosher food in the UAE. Following the incident, increased security measures were implemented for Jewish institutions, including the closure of informal synagogues in Dubai, while the government-recognized synagogue in Abu Dhabi remained operational.

== Attitudes toward Jews ==
=== Prior to 2010 ===
A Jewish Telegraphic Agency report in 1999 stated that: "A British university has banned Jewish authors from its courses at its campus in the United Arab Emirates. The University of Lincolnshire and Humberside has confirmed that books by Jews, as well as those that mention Jews in their bibliographies, are banned by its affiliate in the Persian Gulf state. In addition, the British Council, a state-run organization designed to promote British cultural achievements abroad, also conceded that it acquiesces in the censorship of works by Jews to accommodate "local political, religious or moral publishing laws."

In July 2000, the Harvard Divinity School accepted $2.5 million from the founder of the United Arab Emirates, Zayed bin Sultan Al Nahyan. In 2002, the Zayed Center published a report on the Holocaust that said Zionists - not Nazis - "were the people who killed the Jews in Europe." This led to an uproar that the money be returned and that the center be closed. In August, the UAE government closed the Zayed Center for Coordination and Follow-up, which is a think tank that published and distributed literature, sponsored lectures, and operated a website. The center published some books with themes such as "The Zionist Movement and its Animosity to Jews," and "Al Buraq Wall, Not Wailing Wall" [...] According to a statement from President Zayed's office, the Government closed the center because its activities "starkly contradicted the principles of interfaith tolerance advocated by the president." In 2007, there were "some anti-Semitic or religiously intolerant editorials, op-eds and editorial cartoons in the English and Arabic-language electronic and print media. The Arabic-language press, including government subsidized and quasi-governmental newspapers such as Al-Ittihad, Al-Bayan, and Al-Khaleej, carried editorial cartoons depicting negative images of Jews; Al-Bayan carried religiously intolerant articles as well." As an example, they cite Al-Ittihad, which "carried a cartoon of "the Zionist Lobby" who was depicted as a stereotypical Jew with a hooked nose and wearing a yarmulke;" an op-ed from Al-Bayan in 2006, which poses the question as to whether Zionists were a "part of humanity" and compared Israelis to Nazis; and a cartoon in Al-Ittihad, "in which a stereotypically depicted Jew was standing astride the globe, a reference to the long-standing anti-Semitic conspiracy that Jews control the world." All of the examples stated were described by the U.S. State Department as antisemitic.

=== After 2010 ===
In February 2019 and as part of the United Arab Emirates' national tolerance program, the Ministry of Tolerance officially recognized the UAE's local Jewish population and, according to Rabbi Marc Schneier, were in talks of establishing a proper synagogue, kosher foods and even a mikveh.

Rabbi Michael Schudrich, the chief Rabbi of Poland, during a visit to Abu Dhabi said "There were Jews in Bahrain, Yemen, Egypt and across North Africa, but this corner they didn’t get to...the fact the newest Jewish community is in an Arab country is a tremendous statement." The Rabbi attended the Global Conference of Human Fraternity alongside Pope Francis in Abu Dhabi, he clarified “There is a wrong stereotype that we use that says different religions can’t speak to each other – that a Jew can’t talk to a Muslim”. According to the Rabbi, Pope Francis visit to the UAE depicts the presence of all religions coexisting together and confronting a stereotype. He said “I’m hopeful, naively perhaps, that this could be another step to break that. It is also helpful that it is in the UAE to break that stereotype.”

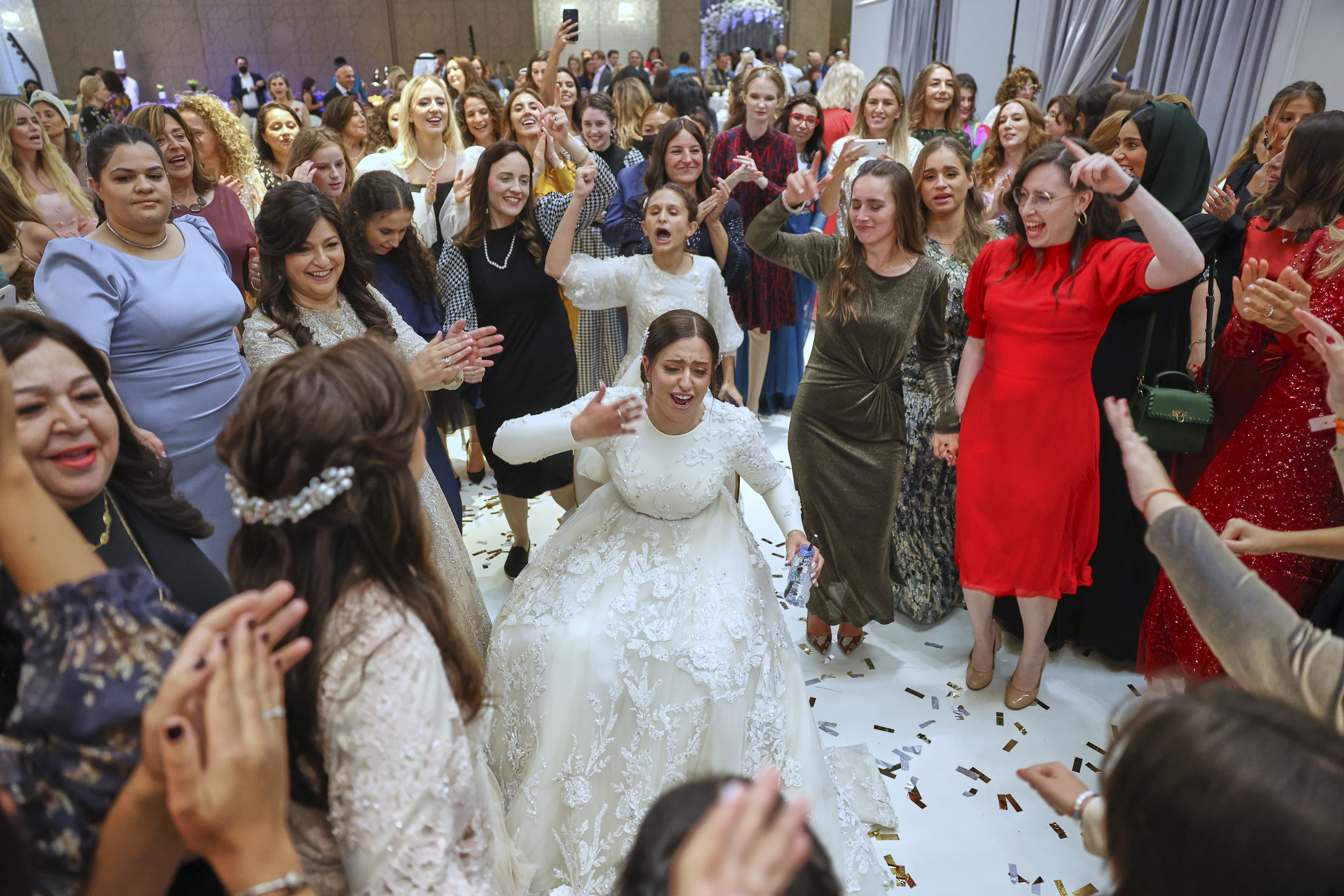
Lea Hadad (middle) at her wedding to Levi Duchman, the largest Jewish event in the nation's history.

A 2022 study focused on Jews and Muslims in Dubai. One of the conclusive outcomes of the study is a somewhat diminishing impact of the Israeli–Palestinian conflict on the Jewish–Muslim relations. In the study "a surfacing inclination towards embracing a joint Muslim–Jewish Middle Eastern identity was perceived".

Since the signing of the Abraham Accords, the United Arab Emirates has hosted 200,000 Jewish tourists, with the local Jewish population estimated to be 10,000. The wedding of Rabbi Levi Duchman and Lea Hadad, held on the second anniversary of the Abraham Accords, became the largest Jewish event in UAE history. It brought together 1,500 guests, including senior Emirati officials and foreign ambassadors from more than 20 countries.

== Yemenite Jewish Community ==
In August/September 2020 a Yemenite Rabbi reported to The New Arab that a program by the Emirati Government planned to transfer the last 100 Jews of Yemen was underway, and that 40 Jews have agreed. Martin Griffiths is currently governing over the Transfer.

As of July 2021, the UAE has managed to reunite two Yemenite Families in Abu Dhabi, with the help of the CIA and the UAE's Chief Rabbi, Elie Abadie.

== Israeli-Emirati relations ==
Ties between Israel and the UAE have been slowly warming. Israel has had a permanent mission at the International Renewable Energy Agency based in Abu Dhabi since 2014. According to USA Today in 2010, Arab states are increasing relations with Israel and American Jews in an effort to undercut Iran's growing influence, contain violence in Iraq and Lebanon and push for a Palestinian solution. US Secretary of State Condoleezza Rice has said Israeli-Palestinian peace deal would weaken militants such as Hamas and Hezbollah. According to the article, Arab states' contacts with Israelis and American Jews go back more than a decade but have never been public.

Since 2017, the UAE together with its allies of the Gulf Cooperation Council formed stronger coordination ties with Israel, in their mutual standoff against the Islamic Republic of Iran.

On August 13, 2020, Israel and the UAE announced the initiation of normalization of relations between the two countries, starting with a meeting to sign bilateral agreements in areas including energy, tourism, direct flights, investment, security, communication and technology over the coming weeks.

== Abraham Accords ==
The Abraham Accords are bilateral agreements on Arab–Israeli normalization signed between Israel and the United Arab Emirates and between Israel and Bahrain on September 15, 2020. Mediated by the United States, the announcement of August 13, 2020, concerned Israel and the Emirates before the subsequent announcement of an agreement between Israel and Bahrain on September 11, 2020. On September 15, 2020, the signing of the agreements was hosted by US president Trump on the Truman Balcony of the White House amid elaborate staging intended to evoke the signings of historic formal peace treaties in prior administrations.

As part of the two agreements, both the Emirates and Bahrain recognized Israel's sovereignty, enabling the establishment of full diplomatic relations. Israel's initial agreement with the Emirates marked the first instance of Israel establishing diplomatic relations with an Arab country since 1994, when the Israel–Jordan peace treaty came into effect. The agreements were named "Abraham Accords" to highlight the common belief of Judaism and Islam in the prophet Abraham.

== See also ==
- Abrahamic religion
- Arab Jews
- Arab states of the Persian Gulf
- Babylonian captivity
- History of the Jews in the Arabian Peninsula
- History of the Jews under Muslim rule
- History of the United Arab Emirates
- Islam and antisemitism
- Jewish exodus from Arab lands
- Jews outside Europe under Nazi occupation
- Judaism and Islam
- List of Jews from the Arab World
- Mizrahi Jews
- Religious antisemitism

=== Jews in the Arabian Peninsula ===
- History of the Jews in Bahrain
- History of the Jews in Kuwait
- History of the Jews in Oman
- History of the Jews in Qatar
- History of the Jews in Saudi Arabia
- Yemenite Jews
