= Levi Duchman =

American rabbi in the UAE

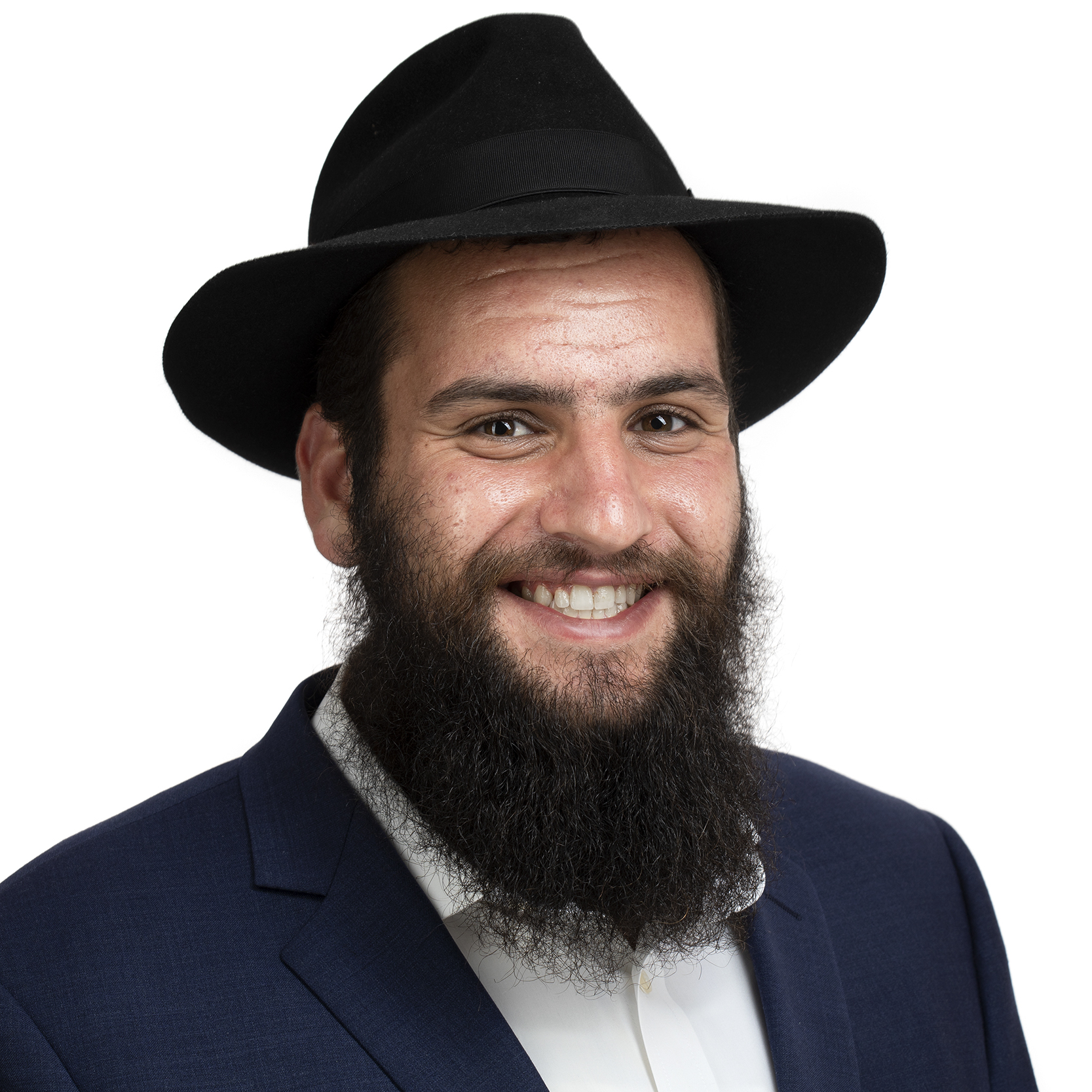
- Born: 1992 or 1993 (age 33–34); Brooklyn, New York City, U.S.
- Occupation: Rabbi
- Known for: Head of the Jewish Community Center of UAE
- Spouse: Lea Hadad (m. 2022)
- Relatives: Zvi Kogan (brother-in-law)

Levi Duchman (Hebrew: לוי דוכמן, Arabic: ليفي دوخمان; born 1992 or 1993) is an American rabbi based in the United Arab Emirates (UAE). He is the first resident chief rabbi of the country. He also serves as the head of the Jewish congregation of Abu Dhabi, of the Jewish Community Center of UAE in Dubai, and as a member of the executive board of the Alliance of Rabbis in Islamic States.

Since his arrival in the UAE in 2014, Duchman has established Jewish communities in Abu Dhabi and Dubai, and a number of Jewish institutions and services, including numerous places of worship, the government-approved kashrut certification, a Jewish education system, business networking and relocation services, and rich community life.

== Early and personal life ==
Duchman was born in Brooklyn, New York City, the United States. He is the son of Feiga and Rabbi Sholom Duchman, director of the Colel Chabad. Duchman is fluent in 5 languages, including Arabic and French. Duchman was the brother-in-law of Zvi Kogan, who was killed in 2024 in a possible antisemitic attack.

His brother Mendel is a schochet in Al-Ain and the rabbi of the Jewish community in Downtown Dubai.

In September 2022, Duchman married Lea Hadad, a Belgian woman of Moroccan Jewish descent, in the UAE's largest Jewish event. Around 1500 people attended, including prominent Emiratis and over 20 foreign ambassadors.

== Rabbinical career ==
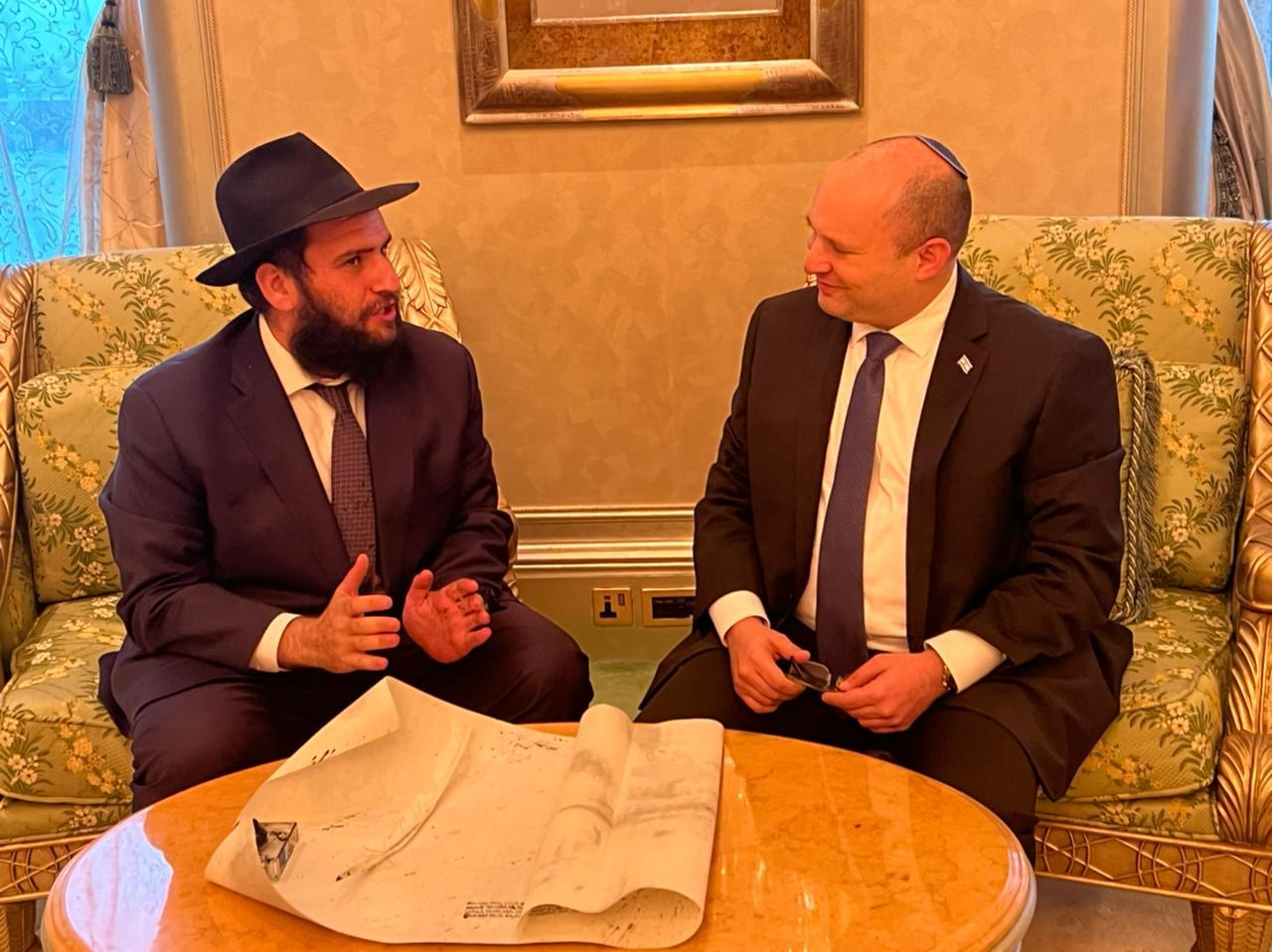
Rabbi Levi Duchman writes a Torah scroll together with the Prime Minister of Israel, Mr. Naftali Bennett

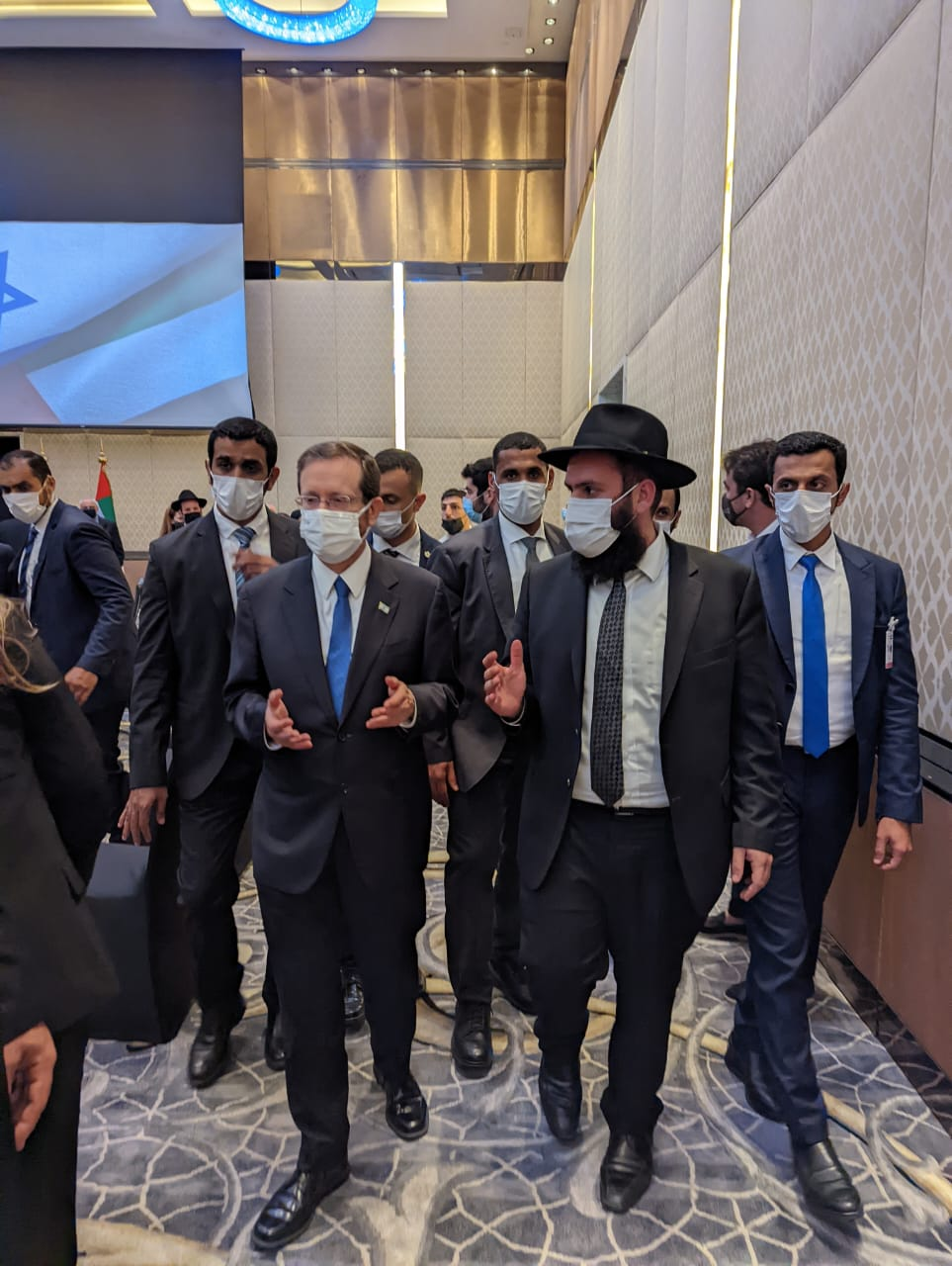
Rabbi Levi Duchman with Israeli president Isaac Herzog visiting Abu Dhabi, January 2022

Duchman has been establishing Jewish institutions and services for the local Jewish community and Jewish visitors across the UAE since 2014. It was in 2019, following the Abraham Accords signed with Israel, that the UAE leadership gave its official recognition to the local Jewish community. As the UAE's resident rabbi, Duchman received the first rabbinical license, license 001.

Duchman is an executive board member of the Alliance of Rabbis in Islamic States. He has visited many other countries in Arabia, including Kuwait, Bahrain, and Oman. He was responsible for affixing the Mezuzah on the Israeli–UAE Embassy in Abu Dhabi.

=== Kashrut in UAE ===
Duchman founded the UAE's official Kosher Certification, the first to be fully licensed by the UAE authorities. Emirates Agency for Kosher Certification (EAKC) is the first legal entity responsible for the assessment of foods, products, processes and services to ensure compliance with Jewish dietary laws. Armani/Kaf is the UAE's first Glatt Kosher Restaurant open in Dubai's Burj Khalifa, supervised under the EAKC. Duchman has awarded kosher certificates to slaughterhouses, and provides kosher food for restaurants, hotels, and food factories. One thousand EAKC certified kosher chickens per week are provided to the community by local shechita. In May 2020, it was reported that the JCC of the UAE has imported the largest kosher meat shipment in the history of the community.

Duchman assisted the Staff of Mohamed Bin Zayed with establishing kosher meals for a meeting between the Prince and Yair Lapid.

In May 2022, Duchman was invited by UAE President Sheikh Mohammed bin Zayed Al Nahyan to extend his condolences on the passing of the late Sheikh Khalifa bin Zayed Al Nahyan at the Presidential Palace, on behalf of the world's Jewish community. Duchman thanked the UAE leadership for its longstanding support of the Jewish UAE community and for its promotion of tolerance and coexistence across the Emirates and the region.

== See also ==
- History of the Jews in the United Arab Emirates
