= Solly Wolf =

British businessman in the UAE (1949/1950–2025)

- Born: 1949 or 1950; Brighton, East Sussex, England
- Died: 4 February 2025 (aged 75)
- Occupation: Businessman
- Organization: Jewish Community Center of UAE

Solly Wolf (1949 or 1950 – 4 February 2025) was a British businessman who resided in the United Arab Emirates. He served as the president of the Jewish Community Center of UAE.

== Life and career ==
=== Early life ===
Wolf was raised in the English city of Brighton. In an interview with Ami Magazine, he recalled:

“We had a traditional home. My zeidy [Grandpa] was a Sadigura chasid with a long beard. My father was also traditional. He davened and put on tefillin every day, and even donated a few sifrei Torah to shuls, but he wasn't a chasid. In my college there were approximately 150 students from all over the world. In those years it was still before the Iranian Revolution, and a lot of Iranian Jews were sending their children outside the country to get a good Jewish education. There were also students from Turkey and South America. "

After his graduation, he launched a jewellery business in Piccadilly Circus, London.

=== Arrival to Germany ===
Wolf eventually moved to Germany, where his wife's family was from. Although he lived in Munich, his in-laws lived in the town of Rosenheim, Bavaria. He would visit Rosenheim regularly. Wolf recalled that Jews were so rare in Rosenheim, that locals would say phrases like, "I'm going to shop by the Jew". His father in-law was referred to by the moniker of "Herr Jude".

After a year and a half, Wolf sold his jewellery business in London to start a textile shop in Munich with his wife; which became successful. Wolf said:

Then in the early ’90s I began to notice that many of my customers were extremely wealthy Arab women. Every year they’d arrive in July and August and buy like crazy. The whole street would be blocked by their black limousines, chauffeurs and bodyguards. I didn't know exactly who they were, but they had big money and they were spending it."

Wolf eventually realized that they were Royals from Arab countries. Most of his customers were from the United Arab Emirates, but there were many from countries like Kuwait, Oman, Saudi Arabia, and Qatar.

=== Move to the United Arab Emirates ===
After a while, some of Wolf's Emirati customers invited him to visit the United Arab Emirates for business. Wolf accepted it reluctantly at first, but after visiting Dubai he was impressed. He moved to the Emirates shortly thereafter.

== Activities in the UAE ==
Solly Wolf praised the Abraham Accords, and was one of those who helped accommodate for the U.S.-Israeli Delegation to the country when the deal was signed. Wolf also told Israel's Channel 12 that such a deal had already been widely expected in the United Arab Emirates.

In addition, he promoted Israeli tourism in the UAE.

== Personal life and death ==
Wolf was fluent in many languages, including Arabic.

He had a close relationship with Sheikh Nahayan Mabarak Al Nahyan, minister of tolerance of the United Arab Emirates.

Wolf died on 4 February 2025, at the age of 75.

== See also ==
- Naum Koen
- Ross Kriel
- Levi Duchman
