= Ross Kriel =

President of the Jewish Council of the Emirates

Ross Kriel is the president of the community Minyan At The Palm, Jewish community activist and the founder of Kosher Arabia catering

== Early life ==
Kriel was born in Johannesburg, South Africa.

== United Arab Emirates ==
Ross Kriel is an attorney and came to Dubai to represent an international law firm. He is currently Deputy General Counsel for Business Development for ENGIE. He arrived to Dubai in 2013, 2 weeks before Rosh Hashanah. He and his wife became the first family in the city to openly offer catering which keeps kosher.

Kriel reacted positively to the signing of the Abraham Accords, saying:

“Only a week ago, the things happening today were still a dream, like seeing the Israelis [sic] and Emirati flags flying side by side on the front pages of local newspapers. “It’s going to be a warm peace.”

== Personal life ==
His wife, Elli (who is of Greek descent), is the head of Elli's Kosher Kitchen, which was made to accommodate for the Dietary Needs of Jewish tourists in the Emirates.

The Kriels live in a villa at the Palm.

== See also ==
- Solly Wolf
- Naum Koen
