= NY Koen Group =

- Type: Private
- Founded: 2006; 20 years ago
- Founder: Naum Koen
- Headquarters: Dubai, UAE
- Area served: Worldwide
- Key people: Naum Koen (Founder and CEO)
- Subsidiaries: Aero Private Jet; Amber Palm; GEMGOW
- Website: ny770.group

NY Koen Group is a multinational holding company involved in diamonds, private aviation, digital technologies, tourism, construction and security with executive offices in Dubai, and operational offices in Ukraine. The corporate office is located on board Queen Elizabeth 2.

== History ==
The Group's chief executive officer, Naum Koen, founded the company in 2006, as a diamond-cutting and supply business.

=== Amber Palm ===
In 2017, Amber Palm, a subsidiary of NY Koen Group, has presented the world's first amber stone mosque at the Burj al Arab hotel in Dubai.

=== GEMGOW ===
In July 2020, it was reported that GEMGOW, a subsidiary of NY Koen Group, an online platform to facilitate trade of precious stones, would sell a 25% stake to HBK Holding, a holding company owned by Sheikh Hamad bin Khalifa Al Nahyan.

=== Israir / Aero Private Jet ===
In October 2020, it was announced that Israir Airlines is being auctioned off, the bids need to be submitted by November 8. On October 13, Dubai-based NY Koen Group, headed by Naum Koen, has announced its intention to participate in the auction through its subsidiary, Aero Private Jet.

=== Kosher Luxury Travel ===
In light of Israel–United Arab Emirates normalization agreement, in October 2020 NY Koen Group has partnered with Kosher Luxury Travel (KLT) to provide Israeli tourists with kosher needs by establishing a Kosher Center at the Queen Elizabeth 2. The center will be launched in mid-December.
