= Colel Chabad =

Charitable organization based in Jerusalem

- כולל חב"ד
- Formation: 1788
- Founder: Rabbi Schneur Zalman of Liadi
- Founded at: Jerusalem, Ottoman Empire
- Type: Charitable organization
- Headquarters: Jerusalem, Israel
- Region served: Israel
- Services: Soup kitchens, food banks, medical clinics, daycare centers, widow and orphan support, immigrant assistance, interest-free loans, career training, job placement, subsidized weddings
- Director: Rabbi Sholom Duchman
- Parent organization: Agudas Chasidei Chabad

Colel Chabad (Hebrew: כולל חב"ד) is the oldest continuously operating charity in Israel, founded in 1788 to support Jews living in the land. The institution runs a network of soup kitchens and food banks, dental and medical clinics, daycare centers, widow and orphan support, and immigrant assistance programs. It also provides interest-free loans, camp scholarships, career training and job placement, subsidized weddings for the poor, and many other social-welfare projects.

Colel Chabad was founded in Lithuania by the first Lubavitcher Rebbe, Rabbi Schneur Zalman of Liadi, and was headed by each Lubavitcher Rebbe thereafter. It is also known as the charity of Rabbi Meir Ba'al HaNes. Its current director is Rabbi Sholom Duchman.

In 2005, Colel Chabad ranked #117 among the top Canadian registered charities by expenditures outside Canada, with $2,623,290 in expenditures.

== Services ==
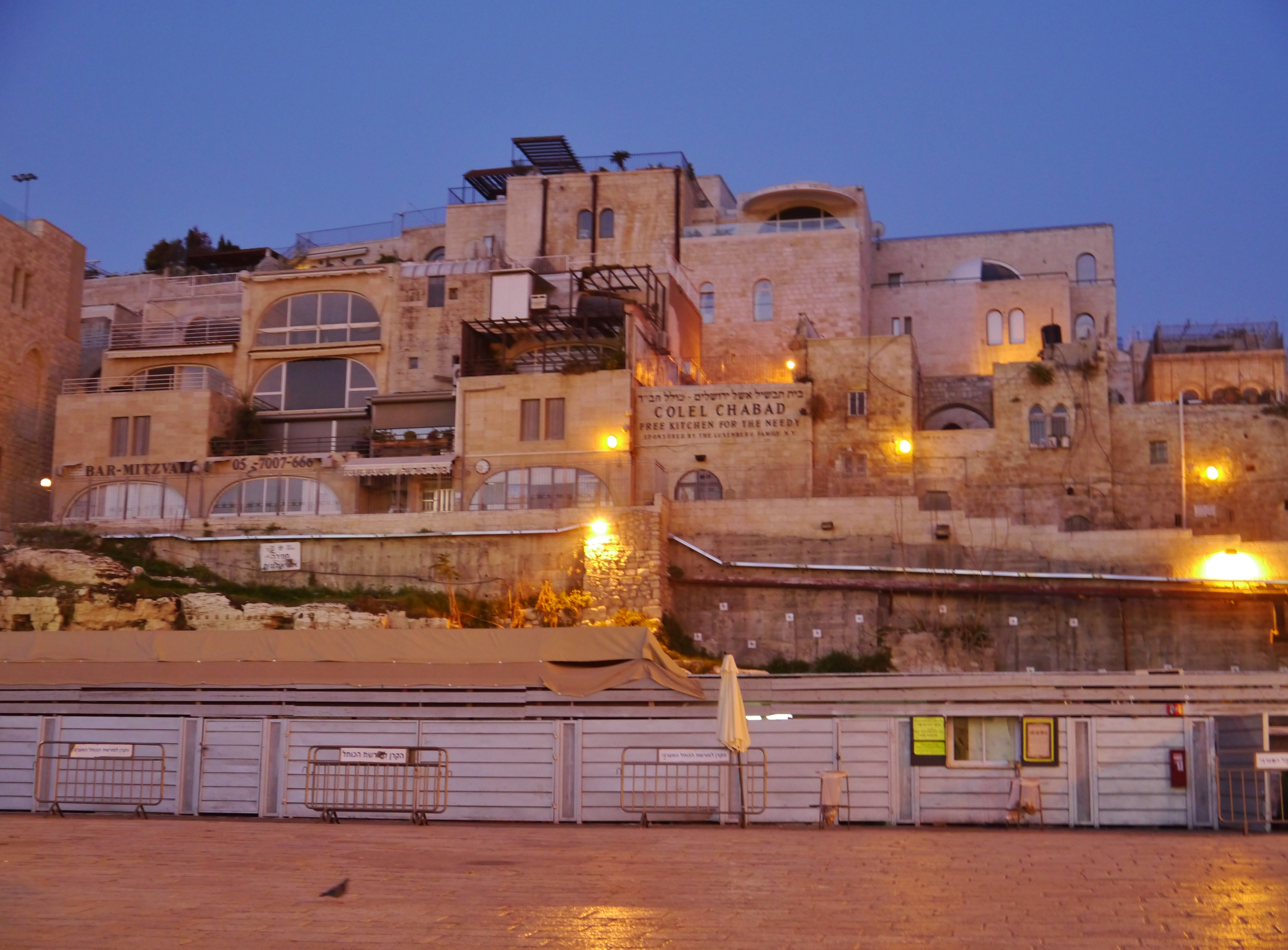
A Colel Chabad soup kitchen in the Old City of Jerusalem.

Colel Chabad presently operates 19 soup kitchens in Israel: 3 in Jerusalem, 3 in Safed, 4 in Ashdod, 4 in Lod, and one each in Ashkelon, Beersheva, Dimona, Ramle, and Yerucham. These kitchens feed 3,000 poor and elderly people daily. One of the Jerusalem soup kitchens is located directly opposite the Western Wall.

A Meals on Wheels program delivers 1,500 meals daily to the homebound, sick and elderly through five kitchens nationwide.

The charity's food banks, constituting Israel's largest food-bank network, distribute crates of foodstuffs to 5,000 impoverished families monthly and 25,000 families before Passover and Rosh Hashana. The charity also distributes 700 brown-bag lunches to poor children in Safed schools.

In 2009, Colel Chabad opened its own chain of at-cost stores located in Beitar Illit, Bnei Brak, and Safed. An estimated 12,000–15,000 shoppers per month patronize the stores, realizing savings of 30–40% off groceries and cleaning supplies.

Colel Chabad sponsors several medical centers serving the poor. These include the Grabski Multiple Sclerosis Center in Migdal HaEmek, the Grabski Pediatric Dental Clinic in Safed and the Konigsberg Pediatric Dental Clinic in Jerusalem, and two mobile pediatric dental clinics that travel to low-income, outlying communities which lack dental clinics of their own.

Colel Chabad also pioneered the concept of hospital summer camps. Volunteers bring counselors, activities, carnivals, music, and arts and crafts directly to hospitalized children.

Colel Chabad daycare centers are located in Ashdod, Ashkelon, Beitar Illit, Rishon LeZion, and Safed. These centers care for over 750 children ages 6 months to 5 years daily.

Colel Chabad has a separate division catering to the needs of widows and orphans. It provides food, clothing and social services for nearly 300 widows and more than 620 children annually. It also arranges tutors for more than 800 children, regular physical testing of each child, and home visits by social workers.

Each summer, Colel Chabad runs a two-week widows' therapeutic retreat while caring for participants' children in summer camps.

Colel Chabad offers absorption services, job counseling, senior programs, a library and an evening yeshiva for Russian immigrants in Jerusalem. Its Kolel Tifereth Zkainim is a network of cultural/educational "clubs" for Soviet immigrants in Ashdod, Ashkelon, Jerusalem and Lod. Colel Chabad also schedules Russian-language Passover Seders throughout Israel for new immigrants.

In 1991, Colel Chabad began organizing mass bar mitzvahs for Russian immigrants to Israel who had not been able to keep Jewish traditions in their homeland. To date, the organization has performed over 17,000 bar and bat mitzvahs. The annual event for 1,000 Russian-immigrant boys and girls takes place at the Western Wall in the presence of government officials, Chief Rabbis and other dignitaries. Colel Chabad volunteers spend months preparing each child to participate in the special day, and each boy receives a pair of tefillin while each girl receives a sterling-silver candlestick. The event concludes with an all-day trip to an amusement park.

The various free-loan funds operated by Colel Chabad address the financial needs of widows and orphans, newlyweds, small-business owners, and shluchim to the Former Soviet Union who wish to purchase a home there.

Since 1997, Colel Chabad has subsidized weddings for needy couples at the Chabad-managed Gutnick and Hadar wedding halls in the Givat Shaul neighborhood of Jerusalem. The charity pays for 40% of weddings for poor couples and 50% for children of widows, accounting for a total of 440 subsidized weddings annually. The two halls are also lower-priced than wedding halls in the center of town for the general religious public.

== Calendar ==
Colel Chabad prints a yearly calendar, the Luach (Hebrew: לוח, "calendar"), compiling of laws and Chabad customs pertaining to the various weeks of the year. The Luach was first published in 1924, and is available as an app, as well as in traditional booklet format (Hebrew and English) and in a Hebrew language wall format for synagogue use, and its online version is published in both Hebrew and English.

The Luach was first compiled by Rabbi Avraham Chaim Naeh, then the secretary of the Edah HaChareidis, to replace the calendar that was at the time distributed by Colel Chabad as fundraising material, which followed conflicting halachic guidance to the stances of the Alter Rebbe's Shulchan Aruch, which is followed by Chabad. The Luach codified Chabad customs that had up until then been passed down as oral tradition, resulting in confusion about practice between international Chabad communities.

== Donations ==
The charity receives donations from large and small donors alike. It distributes a pushka (charity box) which it encourages contributors to donate to every Friday before Shabbat candle-lighting. Large donors are honored at its annual dinner in New York.

At the annual International Awards Gala in New York on 7 January 2026, Colel Chabad honored Ahmed al-Ahmed, the Syrian-born Australian shopkeeper who disarmed one of the gunmen of the 2025 Bondi Beach terrorist attack at a Chabad-hosted Hanukkah event at in Sydney the previous month. Al-Ahmed was introduced by Rabbi Yehoram Ulman of Chabad of Bondi, whose son-in-law Rabbi Eli Schlanger was killed in the attack. Investor Bill Ackman, who pledged $180,000 to Colel Chabad at the event in al-Ahmed's honor, presented him with a menorah inscribed "Light will win".

According to media reports, Colel Chabad was the main charity supported by Sholom Rubashkin, who donated millions of dollars from profits earned by his now-bankrupt company, Agriprocessors. Rubashkin was twice honored at the charity's annual dinner.

One year after the Simchat Torah terrorist attacks in southern Israel on Oct. 7, Debbie and Michael Flacks have given a $5 million donation to erect a new center dedicated to promoting community service and acts of kindness. The 10-story “Flacks Chessed Tower” will be located in the heart of Jerusalem next to the Machaneh Yehudah open-air market.
