= Sholom Duchman =

American Chabad rabbi and charity executive

- Title: Director of Colel Chabad

Personal life
- Occupation: Rabbi, charity executive

Religious life
- Religion: Judaism
- Denomination: Hasidic Judaism
- Movement: Chabad-Lubavitch

Jewish leader
- Organization: Colel Chabad

Sholom Duchman (born c. 1952–1953) is a Chabad-Lubavitch rabbi and charity executive who has served as director of Colel Chabad since 1978. Colel Chabad, founded in 1788 by Shneur Zalman of Liadi, is the oldest continuously operating charitable organization in Israel.

In 1978, when Duchman was 25, the Lubavitcher Rebbe, Menachem Mendel Schneerson, entrusted him with the leadership and expansion of Colel Chabad. During his tenure, the organization expanded from a relatively small charitable operation into a nationwide social-welfare network operating food-security programs, soup kitchens, daycare centers, medical and rehabilitation facilities, and programs for elderly people, widows and orphans.

Duchman also serves on the governing bodies of central Chabad-Lubavitch organizations, including Machne Israel and Merkos L'Inyonei Chinuch.

== Colel Chabad ==
Duchman assumed responsibility for Colel Chabad in 1978 at the direction of Menachem Mendel Schneerson. At the time, according to The Jerusalem Post, the organization's donor records were sufficiently small to be kept in a single box of index cards.

Under Duchman's leadership, Colel Chabad expanded its activities in Israel and developed partnerships with government ministries and local authorities. Its activities came to include food banks and soup kitchens, assistance for elderly people and Holocaust survivors, daycare centers, medical and rehabilitation services, assistance for people with disabilities, and programs supporting widows and orphaned children.

Duchman has described the organization's approach as combining charitable assistance with long-term infrastructure and cooperation with government agencies. Colel Chabad has participated in national food-security programs in cooperation with Israel's Ministry of Welfare and Social Affairs.

By 2026, The Jerusalem Post reported that Colel Chabad was distributing approximately US$200 million annually in charitable assistance and social-welfare services.

=== Food security ===
Food security became one of the principal areas of Colel Chabad's activities during Duchman's leadership. The organization developed a network of soup kitchens and food-distribution programs and worked with Israeli government agencies on programs for families experiencing food insecurity.

Colel Chabad also established the Eshel food-card program, through which eligible families receive prepaid cards for purchasing groceries. The organization has provided assistance to low-income families, elderly people and families of Israel Defense Forces reservists.

Duchman has advocated cooperation between charitable organizations and government agencies as a means of providing assistance on a national scale.

=== Children and families ===
During Duchman's tenure, Colel Chabad expanded programs for children and families, including daycare centers and assistance for widows and orphans.

The organization established an annual collective bar and bat mitzvah program for children who had lost a parent. The program originated in large bar and bat mitzvah celebrations organized for immigrants from the former Soviet Union and was later adapted to support orphaned children.

In May 2026, Duchman participated in a collective bar mitzvah at the Western Wall for 125 boys who had lost a parent through illness, accidents, terrorist attacks or the Israel–Hamas war. Israeli president Isaac Herzog attended the event.

== Activities during the Israel–Hamas war ==
Following the Hamas-led attack on Israel on October 7, 2023, Colel Chabad expanded its humanitarian activities to address wartime needs. Its existing kitchens, warehouses and distribution infrastructure were used to provide assistance to affected families and communities.

The organization provided food and other assistance to displaced families, bereaved families and households of military reservists. Duchman stated that the organization's pre-existing infrastructure allowed it to expand operations rapidly after the attacks.

In 2025, Colel Chabad expanded financial assistance to low-income families of IDF reservists through its food-security programs.

== Chabad leadership ==
In addition to his work with Colel Chabad, Duchman has held positions within the institutional leadership of the Chabad-Lubavitch movement.

He serves on the boards of Machne Israel, Chabad's social-service organization, and Merkos L'Inyonei Chinuch, its educational organization. Merkos oversees educational institutions and the international network of Chabad emissaries.

Duchman has also been involved in implementing religious initiatives at the direction of Menachem Mendel Schneerson. In 1990, he was involved in restoring the recitation of Psalms at the traditional site identified as the Tomb of David in Jerusalem following an instruction from Schneerson.

== Recognition ==
In 2026, The Jerusalem Post included Duchman in its annual list of the 50 most influential Jews. He was jointly placed at number 28 alongside rabbis Dov Landau, Ephraim Mirvis, Rick Jacobs and Mendy Kotlarsky.

The newspaper cited his nearly five decades of leadership of Colel Chabad, the expansion of its social-welfare infrastructure, and his positions within the institutional leadership of Chabad-Lubavitch.
