= Murder of Zvi Kogan =

2024 killing in the United Arab Emirates

Rabbi Zvi Kogan הרב צבי קוגן

Personal life
- Born: 11 August 1996 Ramat Shlomo, Jerusalem
- Died: c. 21 November 2024 (aged 28) Al Ain, United Arab Emirates
- Buried: Mount of Olives, Jerusalem
- Spouse: Rivky Spielman
- Parent(s): Alexander and Etel
- Education: Chabad and Litvish yeshivas
- Occupation: Assistant to the Chief Rabbi of the UAE

Religious life
- Religion: Judaism
- Profession: Rabbi

Jewish leader
- Organisation: Chabad Jewish Community Center of UAE
- Residence: Abu Dhabi, UAE

On 21 November 2024, Zvi Kogan (Hebrew: צבי קוגן, 11 August 1996- c. 21 November 2024), an Israeli-Moldovan rabbi residing in the United Arab Emirates, was abducted and killed. He was an envoy of the Orthodox Jewish Hasidic organization Chabad. On 24 November 2024, a body was found and confirmed to be that of Kogan. Three suspects were arrested. In March 2025, three people were convicted and sentenced to death, with a fourth defendant sentenced to life imprisonment.

== Background ==
Kogan was born in 1996 in Ramat Shlomo, Jerusalem, to Alexander and Etel Kogan. He was raised in his Litvak-Haredi family with his older brother, Reuven.

As a teenager, Kogan learned at Yeshiva Maoz Chayil in Jerusalem, Yeshivas Rabbeinu Chaim Ozer in Bnei Brak, and finally at the Mir Yeshiva in Jerusalem. Before he moved to the United Arab Emirates (UAE), he served his mandatory service in the Israel Defense Forces' 84th "Givati" Infantry Brigade. He was a dual citizen of Israel and Moldova.

Kogan and his wife, Rivky (née Spielman), a U.S. citizen, were married in 2022. She then joined him in Abu Dhabi. She is the niece of Gavriel Noach Holtzberg, a Chabad rabbi who was murdered with his wife by an Islamist militant group in the 2008 Mumbai terror attacks in India.

Kogan was a rabbi, and a representative of the Orthodox Jewish Hasidic organization Chabad's Abu Dhabi chapter. He had been so since the UAE normalized diplomatic relations with Israel in the Abraham Accords in 2020. He worked to explain Judaism and disprove myths and stereotypes about the religion. He was an assistant to Chief Rabbi of the UAE, Levi Duchman, who was his brother-in-law. He also managed a kosher supermarket, Rimon, on Al Wasl Road in Dubai, where he was a resident. Chabad stated that he "worked to expand Jewish life in the UAE" with Duchman through ways that included ensuring the availability of kosher food and opening the country's first Jewish education center.

In 2021, Kogan led a Yizkor memorial prayer during the UAE's first Holocaust remembrance day memorial.

== Abduction and killing ==
Before his abduction, Kogan was last seen at the kosher supermarket he managed in Dubai. He then failed to attend a dental appointment and his wife lost contact with him, leading her to alert a Chabad security chief, who in turn notified local authorities. Kogan had been missing since the afternoon of 21 November 2024. However, Kogan's family said that he last contacted them the day prior.

The Israeli Prime Minister's Office announced Kogan's disappearance on 23 November 2024 in a statement on behalf of the Mossad, and said that Israeli security and intelligence services were investigating the incident. It sparked a joint investigation from the Israeli intelligence agency Mossad and Emirati authorities. An Israeli delegation arrived in the UAE to aid the investigation. Mossad led the investigation into his disappearance, treating it as a terrorist incident.

Kogan's car and phone were found abandoned in Al Ain, Abu Dhabi, 150 kilometres (93 mi) from Dubai and on the border of Oman. Sources close to the investigation indicate that the abductors were planning to drive him to Oman. There was blood and there were signs of a violent struggle found in his car.

Initial reports said that Kogan had been followed by three Uzbeks while he drove to the city after leaving Rimon, the supermarket that he managed. Investigators later said that the assailants tracked Kogan's movements, and then kidnapped him and transported him to Al Ain in his own car, where he was killed. The killers were suspected of then having fled to Turkey. The Israeli intelligence agency Mossad accused Iran of being behind Kogan's death. The Iranian embassy in the UAE denied any Iranian involvement in the killing, and said no evidence had been presented to support the accusation. The body of the 28-year-old Kogan was discovered on 24 November 2024.

== Arrests, trial, and conviction ==
On 24 November, the UAE Ministry of Interior announced the arrest of three Uzbekistan citizens suspected of kidnapping and murdering Kogan. The three suspects, Olimboy Tokhirovich Davlatyarov (28), Makhmudzhon Abdurakhim-oglu Kindzhaboev (28), and Azizbek Kamilovich Ismailov (33), were arrested as they left an airport by taxi in Istanbul, Turkey, during a secret operation by Turkey's National Intelligence Organization and Istanbul police, who acted on a UAE government request. The suspects were caught after landing on a flight to Istanbul. They were then extradited to the Emirates at the request of the UAE. The ministry announced the initiation of legal proceedings, with reports indicating that the three suspects could face the death penalty. In March 2025, three men were sentenced to death, and a fourth person was sentenced to life imprisonment by the Abu Dhabi Federal Court of Appeals’ State Security Chamber. The state-run Emirates News Agency announced defendants had confessed and provided no further details about motive or the kidnapping and murder.

== Funeral ==
On 25 November, Kogan's body was transferred to Israel. His burial ceremonies began in the evening of 25 November, at 770 in the Chabad-Lubavitch town of Kfar Chabad in central Israel, and proceeded to the Mount of Olives in Jerusalem, where he was buried. Kogan was eulogized by many rabbis and leaders including the Ashkenazi Chief Rabbi of Israel Kalman Meir Ber, the Sephardic Chief Rabbi of Israel David Yosef, Rabbi Levi Duchman, who had worked alongside Kogan in the UAE, and Kogan's father, Rabbi Alexander Kogan.

== Reactions ==
Israeli Prime Minister Benjamin Netanyahu stated that he was "deeply shocked" by the killing and vowed that all means would be used to bring the killers, and "those who dispatched them", to justice. Israeli President Isaac Herzog also condemned the killing. The killing occurred as Iran had threatened to retaliate to Israeli airstrikes on its territory on 26 October that took place during a period of heightened tensions between the two countries.

Moldova called it an "act of antisemitism". Moldovan president Maia Sandu wrote on X that "we mourn the tragic loss" of Kogan and "strongly condemn this hateful act".

The United States' Biden Administration condemned the crime, stating that it was "a horrific crime against all those who stand for peace, tolerance, and coexistence" and that "those who carried out this crime, and anyone supporting them, must be held fully accountable."

U.S. Secretary of State Antony Blinken, in a call with the Emirati Foreign Minister Abdullah bin Zayed Al Nahyan, denounced the kidnapping and killing of Kogan. Matthew Miller, the U.S. State Department spokesman stated that Blinken “commended the swift actions taken by the UAE’s law enforcement authorities in response to the murder.”

Other United States political leaders who publicly reacted to the killing include U.S. Members of Congress, Steny Hoyer and Ritchie Torres; New York State Governor Kathy Hochul; and Eric Adams, the Mayor of New York City. Adams later met with Levi Duchman, who worked alongside Kogan, to express his condolences.

On 25 November 2024, Jared Kushner, the son-in-law of President-elect and 45th president of the United States Donald Trump, who had brokered the Abraham Accords which normalized relations between the UAE and Israel in 2020, and his wife, Trump's daughter Ivanka Trump, announced a $1 million donation to the Chabad center in the UAE where Kogan had worked. Shortly afterward, Kushner's brother and sister-in-law, Joshua Kushner and Karlie Kloss, matched the contribution with an additional $1 million donation.

The UAE ambassador to the United States, Yousef Al Otaiba, called Kogan's killing “a crime against the U.A.E.” The Emirati government stated on 24 November that three perpetrators "involved in the murder” had been arrested.

The UAE Ministry of Foreign Affairs expressed its condolences to Kogan's family. They also thanked Turkey for "their cooperation in arresting the perpetrators". The UAE also praised the professionalism of the Emirati authorities, who managed the investigation.

Uzbekistan's Minister of Foreign Affairs said Uzbekistan has been closely cooperating with UAE and Israeli authorities in the investigation.

The Iranian Embassy in the UAE "categorically denied" accusations of Iranian involvement in Kogan's killing.

Chabad is planning a $50 million campaign to establish a Jewish women's college in New York in memory of Kogan.

A website was set up for people to pledge to do "Mitzvahs" or good deeds in memory of Kogan. This is often done in the Orthodox Jewish tradition as a merit for the soul of the deceased. As of 5 December 2024, the global Jewish community had pledged over 40,000 such Mitzvahs in Kogan's memory.

== See also ==
- List of solved missing person cases (2020s)
- Gavriel Holtzberg – Chabad rabbi and emissary killed in an Islamist terrorist attack in India
- Poway synagogue shooting – attack on an American Chabad synagogue
- Jamshid Sharmahd – dual German-American citizen kidnapped by Iran while traveling through Dubai; authorities traced his cellphone to Al Ain then to Sohar in Oman before signals ceased.
