= Naum Koen =

Israeli businessman in UAE

- Наум Коен
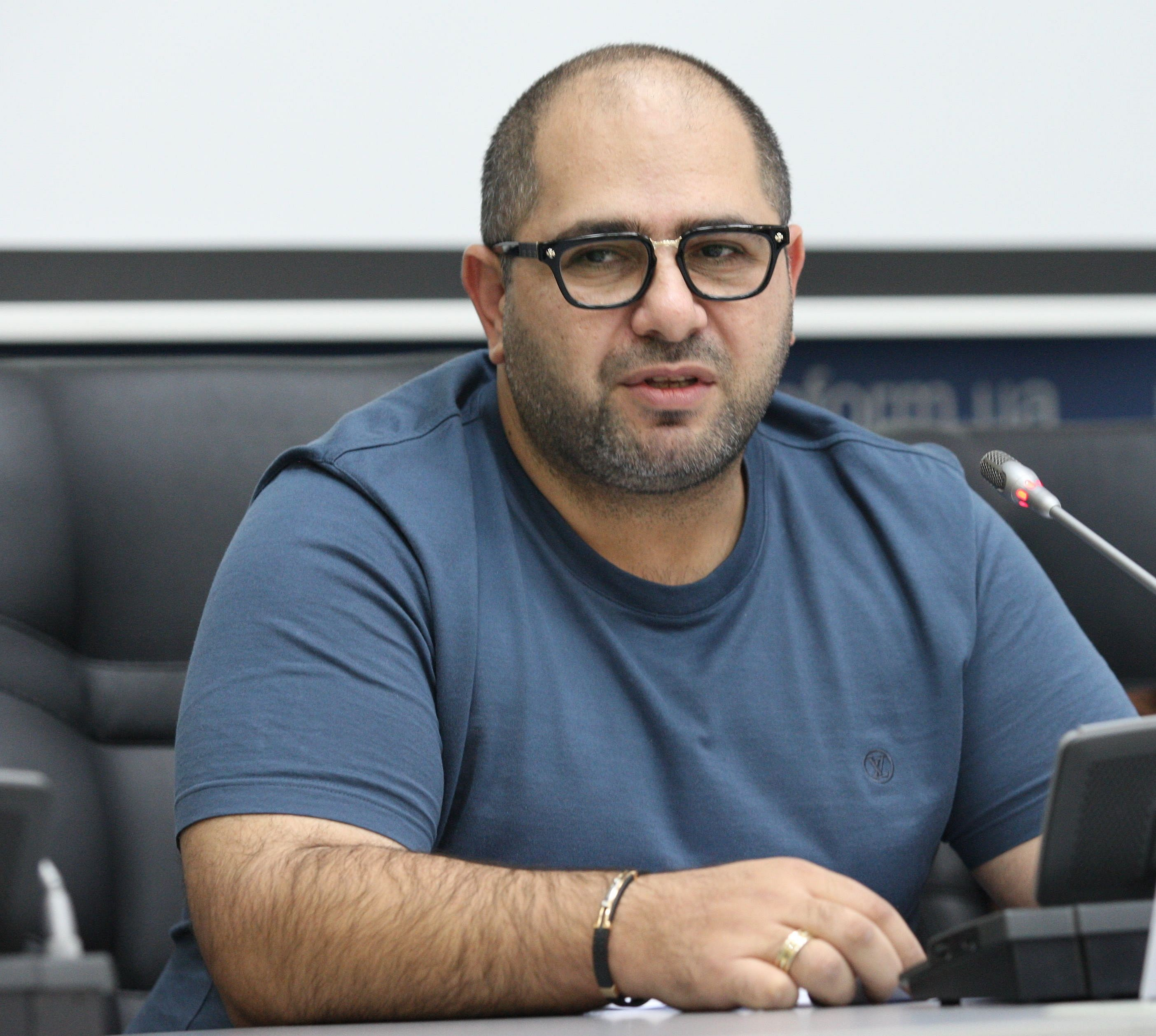
- Born: Nakhshun Nakhshunov; 28 June 1981 (age 44); USSR
- Education: Gemological Institute of America
- Occupation: Businessman
- Years active: 2006–present
- Organization: NY Koen Group
- Spouse: Yevgeniya
- Children: Daniel; Miryam; Sofya; Sara; Yakov
- Parents: Jacob (father); Ludmila (mother)
- Website: www.naumkoen.com

Naum Koen (Russian: Наум Коен; born 29 June 1981) is a UAE-based Israeli-Ukrainian businessman and philanthropist who is the founder and CEO of NY Koen Group. He was named honorary chairman of Beitar Jerusalem Basketball Club.

== Personal life ==
Naum Koen was born in the USSR, his name at birth being Nakhshun Nakhshunov. His family relocated to Ofakim, Israel from the city of Derbent, Russia when he was 13 years old. After a brief service in the Israeli Defence Forces, Koen relocated to Ukraine, where his first business venture was a shawarma shop at a university campus. From thereon he became involved in real estate and the luxury import car business. Naum Koen is married to Yevgeniya Koen and they have 4 children: Daniel, Miryam, Sofya, and Sara. He resides in Dubai. His wife is the founder and CEO of Jeni Coin, a jewelry company wholly owned by NY Koen Group, which has boutiques in multiple countries including Ukraine.

== Career ==
Koen Started his career dealing with the diamond-cutting and supply business. In 2006 he has moved to Dubai and set up a multinational holding company NY Koen Group. In December 2020, he brokered the deal between Moshe Hogeg and Sheikh Hamad bin Khalifa Al Nahyan whereby the Sheikh now owns 50% of the Beitar Jerusalem Football Club.

== Philanthropy ==
In May 2019 it was reported that Koen in partnership with Cyrus S. Poonawalla have proposed supplying Ukraine with 100 thousand doses of measles vaccine for free vaccination. Koen is founder and major sponsor of an Israeli Organization Belev Echad.

== Controversy ==
In January 2018 neighbors complained that Koen was keeping a lion on his property near Kyiv, later research has shown that the lion was kept in good condition with all his needs met. Investigation by Channel 13 News has revealed that a lawsuit was filed in 2013 mentioning Nachshon Nachshonov, according to which he had outstanding debts when he left Israel. Koen's spokesperson said in response that "The allegations raised regarding the diamond deal have already been discussed and rejected by the court".

== See also ==
- Solly Wolf
