= Historical Jewish population by country =

This article lists Jewish population estimates by scope, by year, by country and by geographical area.

== Population ==
All data below, are from the Berman Jewish DataBank at Stanford University in the World Jewish Population (2020) report coordinated by Sergio DellaPergola at the Hebrew University of Jerusalem. The Jewish DataBank figures are primarily based on national censuses combined with trend analysis.

- Core Jewish population refers to those who consider themselves Jews to the exclusion of all else.
- Connected Jewish population includes the core Jewish population and additionally those who say they are partly Jewish or that have Jewish background from at least one Jewish parent.
- Enlarged Jewish population includes the Jewish connected population and those who say they have Jewish background but not a Jewish parent, and all non-Jews living in households with Jews.
- Eligible Jewish population includes all those eligible for immigration to Israel under its Law of Return.

=== Core ===
Country (or Region)	2020			2019			2018			2017			2016		
Country (or Region)	Population	pct	pmp	Population	pct	pmp	Population	pct	pmp	Population	pct	pmp	Population	pct	pmp
World	14,787,200	100.00%	1,920	14,707,400	100.00%	1,930	14,606,000	100.00%	1,940	14,511,100	100.00%	1,960	14,410,700	100.00%	1,960
America Total	6,466,900	43.73%	6,400	6,469,900	43.99%	6,380	6,469,800	44.30%	6,440	6,470,600	44.59%	6,490	6,469,500	44.89%	6,560
Bermuda	100	0.00%	1,540	100	0.00%	1,640	100	0.00%	1,640	100	0.00%	1,540	100	0.00%	1,560
Canada	393,000	2.66%	10,500	392,000	2.67%	10,540	390,500	2.67%	10,640	390,000	2.69%	10,770	388,000	2.69%	10,840
United States	5,700,000	38.55%	17,320	5,700,000	38.76%	17,380	5,700,000	39.03%	17,520	5,700,000	39.28%	17,600	5,700,000	39.55%	17,750
Total North America	6,093,100	41.21%	16,620	6,092,100	41.42%	16,680	6,090,600	41.70%	16,810	6,090,100	41.97%	16,910	6,088,100	42.25%	17,050
Bahamas	200	0.00%	510	300	0.00%	750	300	0.00%	750	300	0.00%	750	300	0.00%	750
Barbados	100	0.00%	350	—N/a	—N/a	—N/a	—N/a	—N/a	—N/a	—N/a	—N/a	—N/a	—N/a	—N/a	—N/a
Costa Rica	2,500	0.02%	490	2,500	0.02%	500	2,500	0.02%	510	2,500	0.02%	510	2,500	0.02%	520
Cuba	500	0.00%	40	500	0.00%	50	500	0.00%	40	500	0.00%	40	500	0.00%	50
Dominican Republic	100	0.00%	10	100	0.00%	10	100	0.00%	10	100	0.00%	10	100	0.00%	10
El Salvador	100	0.00%	20	100	0.00%	20	100	0.00%	20	100	0.00%	20	100	0.00%	20
Guatemala	900	0.01%	50	900	0.01%	50	900	0.01%	50	900	0.01%	50	900	0.01%	60
Jamaica	500	0.00%	180	200	0.00%	70	200	0.00%	70	200	0.00%	70	200	0.00%	70
Mexico	40,000	0.27%	320	40,000	0.27%	310	40,000	0.27%	310	40,000	0.28%	310	40,000	0.28%	310
Netherlands Antilles	400	0.00%	1,250	—N/a	—N/a	—N/a	—N/a	—N/a	—N/a	—N/a	—N/a	—N/a	—N/a	—N/a	—N/a
Panama	10,000	0.07%	2,370	10,000	0.07%	2,380	10,000	0.07%	2,440	10,000	0.07%	2,500	10,000	0.07%	2,500
Puerto Rico	1,500	0.01%	490	1,500	0.01%	450	1,500	0.01%	440	1,500	0.01%	440	1,500	0.01%	430
U.S. Virgin Islands	400	0.00%	3,810	400	0.00%	3,810	400	0.00%	3,810	400	0.00%	3,640	400	0.00%	3,640
Other in Central America, Caribbean	200	0.00%	10	200	0.00%	10	200	0.00%	10	200	0.00%	10	200	0.00%	10
Total Central America, Caribbean	57,400	0.39%	260	57,000	0.39%	260	57,000	0.39%	260	57,000	0.39%	260	57,000	0.40%	260
Argentina	179,500	1.21%	3,990	180,000	1.22%	4,040	180,300	1.23%	4,070	180,500	1.24%	4,140	180,700	1.25%	4,260
Bolivia	500	0.00%	40	500	0.00%	40	500	0.00%	50	500	0.00%	50	500	0.00%	50
Brazil	92,000	0.62%	440	92,600	0.63%	440	93,200	0.64%	450	93,800	0.65%	460	94,200	0.65%	460
Chile	16,000	0.11%	840	18,300	0.12%	980	18,300	0.13%	990	18,300	0.13%	1,010	18,300	0.13%	1,020
Colombia	2,100	0.01%	40	2,100	0.01%	40	2,200	0.02%	40	2,200	0.02%	50	2,300	0.02%	50
Ecuador	600	0.00%	30	600	0.00%	40	600	0.00%	40	600	0.00%	40	600	0.00%	40
Paraguay	1,100	0.01%	150	1,000	0.01%	140	1,000	0.01%	150	1,000	0.01%	140	1,000	0.01%	140
Peru	1,900	0.01%	60	1,900	0.01%	60	1,900	0.01%	60	1,900	0.01%	60	1,900	0.01%	60
Suriname	200	0.00%	330	200	0.00%	330	200	0.00%	330	200	0.00%	400	200	0.00%	330
Uruguay	16,500	0.11%	4,690	16,600	0.11%	4,740	16,700	0.11%	4,770	16,900	0.12%	4,830	17,000	0.12%	5,000
Venezuela	6,000	0.04%	210	7,000	0.05%	220	7,300	0.05%	230	7,600	0.05%	250	7,700	0.05%	250
Total South America	316,400	2.14%	740	320,800	2.18%	750	322,200	2.21%	760	323,500	2.23%	770	324,400	2.25%	780
Total Europe	1,329,400	8.99%	1,600	1,340,200	9.11%	1,620	1,348,600	9.23%	1,630	1,359,100	9.37%	1,660	1,372,400	9.52%	1,670
Austria	10,300	0.07%	1,160	10,000	0.07%	1,140	9,000	0.06%	1,020	9,000	0.06%	1,020	9,000	0.06%	1,050
Belgium	29,000	0.20%	2,530	29,100	0.20%	2,550	29,200	0.20%	2,580	29,300	0.20%	2,590	29,500	0.20%	2,630
Bulgaria	2,000	0.01%	290	2,000	0.01%	290	2,000	0.01%	280	2,000	0.01%	280	2,000	0.01%	280
Croatia	1,700	0.01%	420	1,700	0.01%	410	1,700	0.01%	410	1,700	0.01%	400	1,700	0.01%	400
Cyprus	300	0.00%	240	100	0.00%	80	100	0.00%	80	100	0.00%	80	100	0.00%	80
Czech Republic	3,900	0.03%	370	3,900	0.03%	370	—N/a	—N/a	—N/a	—N/a	—N/a	—N/a	—N/a	—N/a	—N/a
Denmark	6,400	0.04%	1,100	6,400	0.04%	1,100	6,400	0.04%	1,100	6,400	0.04%	1,120	6,400	0.04%	1,120
Estonia	1,900	0.01%	1,430	1,900	0.01%	1,460	1,900	0.01%	1,460	2,000	0.01%	1,540	2,000	0.01%	1,540
Finland	1,300	0.01%	240	1,300	0.01%	240	1,300	0.01%	240	1,300	0.01%	240	1,300	0.01%	240
France	448,000	3.03%	6,910	450,000	3.06%	6,910	453,000	3.10%	6,960	456,000	3.14%	7,050	460,000	3.19%	7,150
Germany	118,000	0.80%	1,420	118,000	0.80%	1,430	116,000	0.79%	1,400	116,500	0.80%	1,410	117,000	0.81%	1,440
Greece	4,100	0.03%	380	4,200	0.03%	400	4,200	0.03%	390	4,200	0.03%	390	4,300	0.03%	370
Hungary	47,200	0.32%	4,830	47,300	0.32%	4,830	47,400	0.32%	4,840	47,500	0.33%	4,850	47,600	0.33%	4,860
Ireland	2,700	0.02%	550	2,600	0.02%	530	2,600	0.02%	540	1,600	0.01%	340	1,600	0.01%	350
Italy	27,300	0.18%	450	27,400	0.19%	450	27,500	0.19%	450	27,300	0.19%	450	27,400	0.19%	440
Latvia	4,500	0.03%	2,350	4,600	0.03%	2,420	4,700	0.03%	2,470	4,800	0.03%	2,400	5,000	0.03%	2,500
Lithuania	2,400	0.02%	860	2,400	0.02%	860	2,500	0.02%	890	2,600	0.02%	900	2,700	0.02%	930
Luxembourg	700	0.00%	1,130	600	0.00%	1,000	600	0.00%	1,000	600	0.00%	1,000	600	0.00%	1,000
Malta	100	0.00%	200	100	0.00%	200	100	0.00%	250	100	0.00%	250	100	0.00%	250
Netherlands	400	0.00%	1,250	300	0.00%	930	300	0.00%	930	300	0.00%	820	300	0.00%	830
Poland	4,500	0.03%	120	4,500	0.03%	120	4,500	0.03%	120	3,200	0.02%	80	3,200	0.02%	80
Portugal	3,100	0.02%	300	600	0.00%	60	600	0.00%	60	600	0.00%	60	600	0.00%	60
Romania	8,900	0.06%	460	9,000	0.06%	460	9,100	0.06%	460	9,200	0.06%	460	9,300	0.06%	470
Slovakia	2,600	0.02%	480	2,600	0.02%	480	2,600	0.02%	480	2,600	0.02%	480	2,600	0.02%	480
Slovenia	100	0.00%	50	100	0.00%	50	100	0.00%	50	100	0.00%	50	100	0.00%	50
Spain	13,000	0.09%	280	11,700	0.08%	250	11,700	0.08%	250	11,800	0.08%	270	11,800	0.08%	250
Sweden	15,000	0.10%	1,460	15,000	0.10%	1,470	15,000	0.10%	1,490	15,000	0.10%	1,520	15,000	0.10%	1,530
Total European Union	788,800	5.33%	1,770	1,078,900	7.34%	2,110	1,077,500	7.38%	2,110	1,078,700	7.43%	2,130	1,084,700	7.53%	2,130
Bosnia and Herzegovina	500	0.00%	140	500	0.00%	140	500	0.00%	140	500	0.00%	140	500	0.00%	140
Channel Islands	200	0.00%	1,180	—N/a	—N/a	—N/a	—N/a	—N/a	—N/a	—N/a	—N/a	—N/a	—N/a	—N/a	—N/a
Gibraltar	800	0.01%	22,860	700	0.00%	20,000	600	0.00%	17,140	600	0.00%	20,000	600	0.00%	20,000
Monaco	700	0.00%	18,420	—N/a	—N/a	—N/a	—N/a	—N/a	—N/a	—N/a	—N/a	—N/a	—N/a	—N/a	—N/a
North Macedonia	100	0.00%	50	100	0.00%	50	—N/a	—N/a	—N/a	—N/a	—N/a	—N/a	—N/a	—N/a	—N/a
Norway	1,300	0.01%	240	1,300	0.01%	250	1,300	0.01%	250	1,300	0.01%	250	1,300	0.01%	250
Serbia	1,400	0.01%	200	1,400	0.01%	200	1,400	0.01%	200	1,400	0.01%	200	1,400	0.01%	200
Switzerland	18,500	0.13%	2,160	18,500	0.13%	2,180	18,600	0.13%	2,190	18,700	0.13%	2,230	18,800	0.13%	2,270
Turkey	14,600	0.10%	180	14,800	0.10%	180	15,000	0.10%	190	15,300	0.11%	190	15,500	0.11%	200
United Kingdom	292,000	1.97%	4,370	292,000	1.99%	4,380	290,000	1.99%	4,370	289,500	2.00%	4,400	290,000	2.01%	4,440
Other in European Union	200	0.00%	10	200	0.00%	10	200	0.00%	10	200	0.00%	10	200	0.00%	10
Total other Europe	330,200	2.23%	1,810	—N/a	—N/a	—N/a	—N/a	—N/a	—N/a	—N/a	—N/a	—N/a	—N/a	—N/a	—N/a
Belarus	8,500	0.06%	900	9,000	0.06%	950	9,500	0.07%	1,000	10,000	0.07%	1,050	10,400	0.07%	1,090
Moldova	1,900	0.01%	540	1,900	0.01%	540	2,000	0.01%	560	3,400	0.02%	940	3,500	0.02%	850
Russia	155,000	1.05%	1,060	165,000	1.12%	1,120	172,000	1.18%	1,170	176,000	1.21%	1,220	179,500	1.25%	1,240
Ukraine	45,000	0.30%	1,070	48,000	0.33%	1,130	50,000	0.34%	1,180	53,000	0.37%	1,240	56,000	0.39%	1,310
Total FSU Republics	210,400	1.42%	1,040	223,900	1.52%	1,110	233,500	1.60%	1,150	242,400	1.67%	1,210	249,400	1.73%	1,240
Total FSU in Europe	219,200	1.48%	1,050	232,800	1.58%	1,120	242,600	1.66%	1,170	251,800	1.74%	1,220	259,100	1.80%	1,250
Total Asia	6,808,500	46.04%	1,510	6,699,700	45.55%	1,500	6,593,000	45.14%	1,490	6,486,600	44.70%	1,490	6,373,700	44.23%	1,480
Israel	6,340,600	42.88%	729,090	6,246,700	42.47%	731,200	6,153,500	42.13%	734,010	6,057,700	41.75%	736,030	5,959,200	41.35%	737,650
West Bank	432,800	2.93%	140,280	418,900	2.85%	138,540	404,600	2.77%	136,600	393,300	2.71%	135,420	377,200	2.62%	133,080
Gaza Strip	0	0.00%	0	0	0.00%	0	0	0.00%	0	0	0.00%	0	0	0.00%	0
Total Israel and Palestine	6,773,400	45.81%	493,850	—N/a	—N/a	—N/a	6,558,100	44.90%	497,380	6,451,000	44.46%	499,160	6,336,400	43.97%	500,370
Total State of Israel	6,773,400	45.81%	741,130	6,665,600	45.32%	743,020	6,558,100	44.90%	745,520	6,451,000	44.46%	747,340	6,336,400	43.97%	748,620
Armenia	100	0.00%	30	100	0.00%	30	100	0.00%	30	100	0.00%	30	—N/a	—N/a	—N/a
Azerbaijan	7,200	0.05%	720	7,500	0.05%	760	7,800	0.05%	790	8,100	0.06%	830	8,400	0.06%	870
Georgia	1,500	0.01%	380	1,500	0.01%	380	1,600	0.01%	410	1,700	0.01%	430	2,600	0.02%	680
Kazakhstan	2,500	0.02%	140	2,600	0.02%	140	2,700	0.02%	150	2,800	0.02%	160	2,900	0.02%	170
Kyrgyzstan	400	0.00%	60	400	0.00%	70	400	0.00%	60	400	0.00%	70	400	0.00%	70
Turkmenistan	200	0.00%	30	200	0.00%	30	200	0.00%	30	200	0.00%	40	200	0.00%	40
Uzbekistan	2,900	0.02%	90	3,000	0.02%	90	3,200	0.02%	100	3,400	0.02%	110	3,500	0.02%	110
Total former USSR in Asia	14,800	0.10%	160	15,300	0.10%	170	16,000	0.11%	180	16,700	0.12%	190	18,000	0.12%	210
China	3,000	0.02%	0	3,000	0.02%	0	2,800	0.02%	0	2,700	0.02%	0	2,600	0.02%	0
India	4,800	0.03%	0	4,800	0.03%	0	4,900	0.03%	0	5,000	0.03%	0	5,000	0.03%	0
Indonesia	100	0.00%	0	100	0.00%	0	100	0.00%	0	100	0.00%	0	100	0.00%	0
Iran	9,500	0.06%	110	8,300	0.06%	100	8,500	0.06%	110	8,500	0.06%	110	9,000	0.06%	110
Japan	1,000	0.01%	10	1,000	0.01%	10	1,000	0.01%	10	1,000	0.01%	10	1,000	0.01%	10
Philippines	100	0.00%	0	100	0.00%	0	100	0.00%	0	100	0.00%	0	100	0.00%	0
Singapore	900	0.01%	160	900	0.01%	160	900	0.01%	160	900	0.01%	160	900	0.01%	160
South Korea	100	0.00%	0	100	0.00%	0	100	0.00%	0	100	0.00%	0	—N/a	—N/a	—N/a
Syria and Lebanon	100	0.00%	0	—N/a	—N/a	—N/a	—N/a	—N/a	—N/a	—N/a	—N/a	—N/a	—N/a	—N/a	—N/a
Taiwan	100	0.00%	0	100	0.00%	0	100	0.00%	0	100	0.00%	0	100	0.00%	0
Thailand	200	0.00%	0	200	0.00%	0	200	0.00%	0	200	0.00%	0	200	0.00%	0
United Arab Emirates	300	0.00%	30	—N/a	—N/a	—N/a	—N/a	—N/a	—N/a	—N/a	—N/a	—N/a	—N/a	—N/a	—N/a
Other in former USSR in Asia	200	0.00%	10	200	0.00%	10	200	0.00%	10	200	0.00%	10	200	0.00%	10
Total other Asia	20,300	0.14%	0	18,800	0.13%	0	18,900	0.13%	0	18,900	0.13%	0	19,300	0.13%	0
Total Africa	56,800	0.38%	40	72,000	0.49%	60	73,600	0.50%	60	74,000	0.51%	60	74,500	0.52%	60
Egypt	100	0.00%	0	100	0.00%	0	100	0.00%	0	100	0.00%	0	100	0.00%	0
Ethiopia	100	0.00%	0	100	0.00%	0	100	0.00%	0	100	0.00%	0	100	0.00%	0
Morocco	2,100	0.01%	60	2,100	0.01%	60	2,150	0.01%	60	2,200	0.02%	60	2,300	0.02%	70
Tunisia	1,000	0.01%	90	1,000	0.01%	90	1,050	0.01%	90	1,100	0.01%	100	1,100	0.01%	100
Total Northern Africa	3,300	0.02%	10	3,300	0.02%	10	3,400	0.02%	10	3,500	0.02%	10	3,600	0.02%	10
Botswana	100	0.00%	40	100	0.00%	50	100	0.00%	40	100	0.00%	50	100	0.00%	50
DR Congo	100	0.00%	0	100	0.00%	0	100	0.00%	0	100	0.00%	0	100	0.00%	0
Kenya	300	0.00%	10	300	0.00%	10	300	0.00%	10	300	0.00%	10	300	0.00%	10
Madagascar	100	0.00%	0	100	0.00%	0	100	0.00%	0	100	0.00%	0	100	0.00%	0
Namibia	100	0.00%	40	100	0.00%	40	100	0.00%	40	100	0.00%	40	100	0.00%	40
Nigeria	100	0.00%	0	100	0.00%	0	100	0.00%	0	100	0.00%	0	100	0.00%	0
South Africa	52,300	0.35%	890	67,500	0.46%	1,170	69,000	0.47%	1,220	69,300	0.48%	1,240	69,500	0.48%	1,260
Zimbabwe	200	0.00%	10	200	0.00%	10	200	0.00%	10	200	0.00%	10	400	0.00%	20
Other in Sub-Saharan Africa	200	0.00%	10	200	0.00%	10	200	0.00%	10	200	0.00%	10	200	0.00%	10
Total Sub-Saharan Africa	53,500	0.36%	60	68,700	0.47%	70	70,200	0.48%	80	70,500	0.49%	80	70,900	0.49%	80
Total Oceania	125,600	0.85%	2,960	125,600	0.85%	3,060	121,000	0.83%	2,880	120,800	0.83%	3,020	120,600	0.84%	3,020
Australia	118,000	0.80%	4,660	118,000	0.80%	4,900	113,400	0.78%	4,630	113,200	0.78%	4,700	113,000	0.78%	4,730
New Zealand	7,500	0.05%	1,510	7,500	0.05%	1,530	7,500	0.05%	1,560	7,500	0.05%	1,600	7,500	0.05%	1,630
Other in Oceania	200	0.00%	10	200	0.00%	10	200	0.00%	10	200	0.00%	10	200	0.00%	10

=== Connected ===
Country (or Region)	2020			2019			2018			2017			2016		
Country (or Region)	Population	pct	pmp	Population	pct	pmp	Population	pct	pmp	Population	pct	pmp	Population	pct	pmp
World	18,030,900	100.00%	2,341	17,917,750	100.00%	2,351	17,794,400	100.00%	2,363	17,645,650	100.00%	2,383	17,522,600	100.00%	2,383
America Total	8,954,500	49.66%	8,862	8,955,300	49.98%	8,831	8,965,100	50.38%	8,924	8,965,100	50.81%	8,992	8,965,100	51.16%	9,091
Bermuda	200	0.00%	3,080	200	0.00%	3,280	200	0.00%	3,280	200	0.00%	3,080	200	0.00%	3,120
Canada	450,000	2.50%	12,023	450,000	2.51%	12,099	450,000	2.53%	12,261	450,000	2.55%	12,427	450,000	2.57%	12,572
United States	8,000,000	44.37%	24,309	8,000,000	44.65%	24,393	8,000,000	44.96%	24,589	8,000,000	45.34%	24,702	8,000,000	45.66%	24,912
Total North America	8,450,200	46.87%	23,049	8,450,200	47.16%	23,136	8,450,200	47.49%	23,322	8,450,200	47.89%	23,463	8,450,200	48.22%	23,665
Bahamas	500	0.00%	1,275	500	0.00%	1,250	500	0.00%	1,250	500	0.00%	1,250	500	0.00%	1,250
Barbados	200	0.00%	700	—N/a	—N/a	—N/a	—N/a	—N/a	—N/a	—N/a	—N/a	—N/a	—N/a	—N/a	—N/a
Costa Rica	2,800	0.02%	549	2,800	0.02%	560	2,800	0.02%	571	2,800	0.02%	571	2,800	0.02%	582
Cuba	1,000	0.01%	80	1,000	0.01%	100	1,000	0.01%	80	1,000	0.01%	80	1,000	0.01%	100
Dominican Republic	200	0.00%	20	200	0.00%	20	200	0.00%	20	200	0.00%	20	200	0.00%	20
El Salvador	200	0.00%	40	200	0.00%	40	200	0.00%	40	200	0.00%	40	200	0.00%	40
Guatemala	1,200	0.01%	67	1,200	0.01%	67	1,200	0.01%	67	1,200	0.01%	67	1,200	0.01%	80
Jamaica	300	0.00%	108	300	0.00%	105	300	0.00%	105	300	0.00%	105	300	0.00%	105
Mexico	45,000	0.25%	360	45,000	0.25%	349	45,000	0.25%	349	45,000	0.26%	349	45,000	0.26%	349
Netherlands Antilles	500	0.00%	1,563	—N/a	—N/a	—N/a	—N/a	—N/a	—N/a	—N/a	—N/a	—N/a	—N/a	—N/a	—N/a
Panama	11,000	0.06%	2,607	11,000	0.06%	2,618	11,000	0.06%	2,684	11,000	0.06%	2,750	11,000	0.06%	2,750
Puerto Rico	2,000	0.01%	653	2,000	0.01%	600	2,000	0.01%	587	2,000	0.01%	587	2,000	0.01%	573
U.S. Virgin Islands	600	0.00%	5,715	600	0.00%	5,715	600	0.00%	5,715	600	0.00%	5,460	600	0.00%	5,460
Other in Central America, Caribbean	400	0.00%	20	400	0.00%	20	300	0.00%	15	300	0.00%	15	300	0.00%	15
Total Central America, Caribbean	65,900	0.37%	299	—N/a	—N/a	—N/a	65,600	0.37%	299	65,600	0.37%	299	—N/a	—N/a	—N/a
Argentina	260,000	1.44%	5,779	260,000	1.45%	5,836	270,000	1.52%	6,095	270,000	1.53%	6,193	270,000	1.54%	6,365
Bolivia	700	0.00%	56	700	0.00%	56	700	0.00%	70	700	0.00%	70	700	0.00%	70
Brazil	120,000	0.67%	574	120,000	0.67%	570	120,000	0.67%	579	120,000	0.68%	588	120,000	0.68%	586
Chile	20,000	0.11%	1,050	21,000	0.12%	1,125	21,000	0.12%	1,136	21,000	0.12%	1,159	21,000	0.12%	1,170
Colombia	2,800	0.02%	53	2,800	0.02%	53	2,800	0.02%	51	2,800	0.02%	64	2,800	0.02%	61
Ecuador	800	0.00%	40	800	0.00%	53	800	0.00%	53	800	0.00%	53	800	0.00%	53
Paraguay	1,300	0.01%	177	1,300	0.01%	182	1,300	0.01%	195	1,300	0.01%	182	1,300	0.01%	182
Peru	2,400	0.01%	76	2,400	0.01%	76	2,300	0.01%	73	2,300	0.01%	73	2,300	0.01%	73
Suriname	400	0.00%	660	400	0.00%	660	400	0.00%	660	400	0.00%	800	400	0.00%	660
Uruguay	20,000	0.11%	5,685	20,000	0.11%	5,711	20,000	0.11%	5,713	20,000	0.11%	5,716	20,000	0.11%	5,882
Venezuela	10,000	0.06%	350	10,000	0.06%	314	10,000	0.06%	315	10,000	0.06%	329	10,000	0.06%	325
Total South America	438,400	2.43%	1,025	439,400	2.45%	1,027	449,300	2.52%	1,060	449,300	2.55%	1,069	449,300	2.56%	1,080
Total Europe	1,819,300	10.09%	2,190	1,814,000	10.12%	2,193	1,804,700	10.14%	2,181	1,771,100	10.04%	2,163	1,770,100	10.10%	2,154
Austria	14,000	0.08%	1,577	14,000	0.08%	1,596	14,000	0.08%	1,587	14,000	0.08%	1,587	14,000	0.08%	1,633
Belgium	35,000	0.19%	3,053	35,000	0.20%	3,067	35,000	0.20%	3,092	35,000	0.20%	3,094	35,000	0.20%	3,120
Bulgaria	4,000	0.02%	580	4,000	0.02%	580	4,000	0.02%	560	4,000	0.02%	560	4,000	0.02%	560
Croatia	2,400	0.01%	593	2,400	0.01%	579	2,400	0.01%	579	2,400	0.01%	565	2,400	0.01%	565
Cyprus	400	0.00%	320	200	0.00%	160	200	0.00%	160	200	0.00%	160	200	0.00%	160
Czech Republic	5,000	0.03%	474	5,000	0.03%	474	—N/a	—N/a	—N/a	—N/a	—N/a	—N/a	—N/a	—N/a	—N/a
Denmark	7,500	0.04%	1,289	7,500	0.04%	1,289	7,500	0.04%	1,289	7,500	0.04%	1,313	7,500	0.04%	1,313
Estonia	2,700	0.01%	2,032	2,700	0.02%	2,075	2,600	0.01%	1,998	2,600	0.01%	2,002	2,600	0.01%	2,002
Finland	1,600	0.01%	295	1,600	0.01%	295	1,600	0.01%	295	1,600	0.01%	295	1,600	0.01%	295
France	550,000	3.05%	8,483	550,000	3.07%	8,446	530,000	2.98%	8,143	530,000	3.00%	8,194	530,000	3.02%	8,238
Germany	150,000	0.83%	1,805	150,000	0.84%	1,818	150,000	0.84%	1,810	150,000	0.85%	1,815	150,000	0.86%	1,846
Greece	5,200	0.03%	482	5,200	0.03%	495	5,500	0.03%	511	5,500	0.03%	511	5,500	0.03%	473
Hungary	75,000	0.42%	7,675	75,000	0.42%	7,659	75,000	0.42%	7,658	75,000	0.43%	7,658	75,000	0.43%	7,658
Ireland	3,600	0.02%	733	3,600	0.02%	734	3,600	0.02%	748	2,000	0.01%	425	2,000	0.01%	438
Italy	34,000	0.19%	560	34,000	0.19%	558	34,000	0.19%	556	34,000	0.19%	560	33,000	0.19%	530
Latvia	8,000	0.04%	4,178	8,000	0.04%	4,209	8,000	0.04%	4,204	8,000	0.05%	4,000	8,000	0.05%	4,000
Lithuania	4,700	0.03%	1,684	4,700	0.03%	1,684	4,700	0.03%	1,673	4,700	0.03%	1,627	4,700	0.03%	1,619
Luxembourg	900	0.00%	1,453	800	0.00%	1,333	800	0.00%	1,333	800	0.00%	1,333	800	0.00%	1,333
Malta	200	0.00%	400	200	0.00%	400	200	0.00%	500	200	0.00%	500	200	0.00%	500
Netherlands	500	0.00%	1,563	500	0.00%	1,550	500	0.00%	1,550	500	0.00%	1,367	500	0.00%	1,383
Poland	7,000	0.04%	187	7,000	0.04%	187	7,000	0.04%	187	5,000	0.03%	125	5,000	0.03%	125
Portugal	3,500	0.02%	339	800	0.00%	80	800	0.00%	80	800	0.00%	80	800	0.00%	80
Romania	13,000	0.07%	672	13,000	0.07%	664	13,500	0.08%	682	13,500	0.08%	675	13,500	0.08%	682
Slovakia	3,600	0.02%	665	3,600	0.02%	665	3,600	0.02%	665	3,600	0.02%	665	3,600	0.02%	665
Slovenia	200	0.00%	100	200	0.00%	100	200	0.00%	100	200	0.00%	100	200	0.00%	100
Spain	16,000	0.09%	345	15,000	0.08%	321	15,000	0.08%	321	15,000	0.09%	343	15,000	0.09%	318
Sweden	20,000	0.11%	1,947	20,000	0.11%	1,960	20,000	0.11%	1,987	20,000	0.11%	2,027	20,000	0.11%	2,040
Total European Union	1,010,500	5.60%	2,267	1,336,500	7.46%	2,614	1,317,200	7.40%	2,579	1,313,600	7.44%	2,594	1,312,600	7.49%	2,578
Bosnia and Herzegovina	800	0.00%	224	800	0.00%	224	800	0.00%	224	800	0.00%	224	800	0.00%	224
Channel Islands	250	0.00%	1,475	—N/a	—N/a	—N/a	—N/a	—N/a	—N/a	—N/a	—N/a	—N/a	—N/a	—N/a	—N/a
Gibraltar	900	0.00%	25,718	800	0.00%	22,857	700	0.00%	19,997	700	0.00%	23,333	700	0.00%	23,333
Monaco	900	0.00%	23,683	—N/a	—N/a	—N/a	—N/a	—N/a	—N/a	—N/a	—N/a	—N/a	—N/a	—N/a	—N/a
North Macedonia	200	0.00%	100	200	0.00%	100	—N/a	—N/a	—N/a	—N/a	—N/a	—N/a	—N/a	—N/a	—N/a
Norway	1,600	0.01%	295	1,600	0.01%	308	1,500	0.01%	288	1,500	0.01%	288	1,500	0.01%	288
Serbia	2,100	0.01%	300	2,100	0.01%	300	2,100	0.01%	300	2,100	0.01%	300	2,100	0.01%	300
Switzerland	22,000	0.12%	2,569	22,000	0.12%	2,592	22,000	0.12%	2,590	22,000	0.12%	2,624	22,000	0.13%	2,656
Turkey	19,000	0.11%	234	19,000	0.11%	231	19,300	0.11%	244	19,300	0.11%	240	19,300	0.11%	249
United Kingdom	330,000	1.83%	4,939	330,000	1.84%	4,950	330,000	1.85%	4,973	330,000	1.87%	5,016	330,000	1.88%	5,052
Other in European Union	400	0.00%	20	400	0.00%	20	300	0.00%	15	300	0.00%	15	300	0.00%	15
Total other Europe	378,000	2.10%	2,072	—N/a	—N/a	—N/a	—N/a	—N/a	—N/a	—N/a	—N/a	—N/a	—N/a	—N/a	—N/a
Belarus	17,000	0.09%	1,800	17,000	0.09%	1,794	18,000	0.10%	1,895	18,000	0.10%	1,890	18,000	0.10%	1,887
Moldova	3,800	0.02%	1,080	3,800	0.02%	1,080	5,700	0.03%	1,596	5,700	0.03%	1,576	5,700	0.03%	1,384
Russia	320,000	1.77%	2,188	320,000	1.79%	2,172	320,000	1.80%	2,177	290,000	1.64%	2,010	290,000	1.66%	2,003
Ukraine	90,000	0.50%	2,140	90,000	0.50%	2,119	97,000	0.55%	2,289	97,000	0.55%	2,269	97,000	0.55%	2,269
Total FSU Republics	430,800	2.39%	2,129	430,800	2.40%	2,136	440,700	2.48%	2,170	410,700	2.33%	2,050	410,700	2.34%	2,042
Total FSU in Europe	446,200	2.47%	2,137	446,200	2.49%	2,147	456,000	2.56%	2,199	426,000	2.41%	2,064	426,000	2.43%	2,055
Total Asia	7,046,700	39.08%	1,563	6,928,050	38.67%	1,551	6,809,000	38.26%	1,539	6,693,850	37.93%	1,538	6,571,800	37.50%	1,526
Israel	6,559,300	36.38%	754,238	6,455,611	36.03%	755,654	6,349,300	35.68%	757,366	6,245,750	35.40%	758,879	6,140,050	35.04%	760,036
West Bank	437,800	2.43%	141,901	423,339	2.36%	140,008	408,900	2.30%	138,052	397,500	2.25%	136,866	381,350	2.18%	134,544
Gaza Strip	0	0.00%	—N/a	0	0.00%	—N/a	0	0.00%	—N/a	0	0.00%	—N/a	0	0.00%	—N/a
Total Israel and Palestine	6,997,100	38.81%	510,160	—N/a	—N/a	—N/a	6,758,200	37.98%	512,556	6,643,250	37.65%	514,036	6,521,400	37.22%	514,979
Total State of Israel	6,997,100	38.81%	765,607	6,878,950	38.39%	766,802	6,758,200	37.98%	768,267	6,643,250	37.65%	769,612	6,521,400	37.22%	770,477
Armenia	300	0.00%	90	300	0.00%	90	300	0.00%	90	200	0.00%	60	—N/a	—N/a	—N/a
Azerbaijan	10,500	0.06%	1,050	10,500	0.06%	1,064	10,500	0.06%	1,063	10,500	0.06%	1,076	10,500	0.06%	1,088
Georgia	3,000	0.02%	760	3,000	0.02%	760	4,500	0.03%	1,153	4,500	0.03%	1,138	4,500	0.03%	1,177
Kazakhstan	4,800	0.03%	269	4,800	0.03%	258	4,800	0.03%	267	4,800	0.03%	274	4,800	0.03%	281
Kyrgyzstan	700	0.00%	105	700	0.00%	123	700	0.00%	105	700	0.00%	123	700	0.00%	123
Turkmenistan	400	0.00%	60	400	0.00%	60	400	0.00%	60	300	0.00%	60	300	0.00%	60
Uzbekistan	6,000	0.03%	186	6,000	0.03%	180	6,000	0.03%	188	6,000	0.03%	194	6,000	0.03%	189
Total former USSR in Asia	25,700	0.14%	278	25,700	0.14%	286	27,200	0.15%	306	27,000	0.15%	307	26,800	0.15%	313
China	3,200	0.02%	0	3,200	0.02%	0	2,900	0.02%	0	2,900	0.02%	0	2,900	0.02%	0
India	6,000	0.03%	0	6,000	0.03%	0	6,000	0.03%	0	6,000	0.03%	0	6,000	0.03%	0
Indonesia	200	0.00%	0	200	0.00%	0	200	0.00%	0	200	0.00%	0	200	0.00%	0
Iran	10,500	0.06%	122	10,500	0.06%	127	11,000	0.06%	142	11,000	0.06%	142	11,000	0.06%	134
Japan	1,200	0.01%	12	1,200	0.01%	12	1,200	0.01%	12	1,200	0.01%	12	1,200	0.01%	12
Philippines	200	0.00%	0	200	0.00%	0	200	0.00%	0	200	0.00%	0	200	0.00%	0
Singapore	1,000	0.01%	178	1,000	0.01%	178	1,000	0.01%	178	1,000	0.01%	178	1,000	0.01%	178
South Korea	200	0.00%	0	200	0.00%	0	200	0.00%	0	200	0.00%	0	—N/a	—N/a	—N/a
Syria and Lebanon	200	0.00%	0	—N/a	—N/a	—N/a	—N/a	—N/a	—N/a	—N/a	—N/a	—N/a	—N/a	—N/a	—N/a
Taiwan	200	0.00%	0	200	0.00%	0	200	0.00%	0	200	0.00%	0	200	0.00%	0
Thailand	300	0.00%	0	300	0.00%	0	300	0.00%	0	300	0.00%	0	300	0.00%	0
United Arab Emirates	500	0.00%	50	—N/a	—N/a	—N/a	—N/a	—N/a	—N/a	—N/a	—N/a	—N/a	—N/a	—N/a	—N/a
Other in former USSR in Asia	400	0.00%	20	400	0.00%	20	300	0.00%	15	300	0.00%	15	300	0.00%	15
Total other Asia	23,900	0.13%	0	23,400	0.13%	0	23,600	0.13%	0	23,600	0.13%	0	23,600	0.13%	0
Total Africa	71,700	0.40%	50	81,700	0.46%	68	81,900	0.46%	67	81,900	0.46%	66	81,900	0.47%	66
Egypt	200	0.00%	0	200	0.00%	0	200	0.00%	0	200	0.00%	0	200	0.00%	0
Ethiopia	500	0.00%	0	500	0.00%	0	500	0.00%	0	500	0.00%	0	500	0.00%	0
Morocco	2,500	0.01%	71	2,500	0.01%	71	2,500	0.01%	70	2,500	0.01%	68	2,500	0.01%	76
Tunisia	1,200	0.01%	108	1,200	0.01%	108	1,200	0.01%	103	1,200	0.01%	109	1,200	0.01%	109
Total Northern Africa	4,400	0.02%	13	4,400	0.02%	13	4,400	0.02%	13	4,400	0.02%	13	4,400	0.03%	12
Botswana	200	0.00%	80	200	0.00%	100	200	0.00%	80	200	0.00%	100	200	0.00%	100
DR Congo	200	0.00%	0	200	0.00%	0	200	0.00%	0	200	0.00%	0	200	0.00%	0
Kenya	500	0.00%	17	500	0.00%	17	500	0.00%	17	500	0.00%	17	500	0.00%	17
Madagascar	200	0.00%	0	200	0.00%	0	200	0.00%	0	200	0.00%	0	200	0.00%	0
Namibia	200	0.00%	80	200	0.00%	80	200	0.00%	80	200	0.00%	80	200	0.00%	80
Nigeria	200	0.00%	0	200	0.00%	0	200	0.00%	0	200	0.00%	0	200	0.00%	0
South Africa	65,000	0.36%	1,106	75,000	0.42%	1,300	75,000	0.42%	1,326	75,000	0.43%	1,342	75,000	0.43%	1,360
Zimbabwe	400	0.00%	20	400	0.00%	20	600	0.00%	30	600	0.00%	30	600	0.00%	30
Other in Sub-Saharan Africa	400	0.00%	20	400	0.00%	20	300	0.00%	15	300	0.00%	15	300	0.00%	15
Total Sub-Saharan Africa	67,300	0.37%	75	77,300	0.43%	79	77,500	0.44%	88	77,500	0.44%	88	77,500	0.44%	87
Total Oceania	138,700	0.77%	3,269	138,700	0.77%	3,379	133,700	0.75%	3,182	133,700	0.76%	3,343	133,700	0.76%	3,348
Australia	130,000	0.72%	5,134	130,000	0.73%	5,398	125,000	0.70%	5,104	125,000	0.71%	5,190	125,000	0.71%	5,232
New Zealand	8,500	0.05%	1,711	8,500	0.05%	1,734	8,500	0.05%	1,768	8,500	0.05%	1,813	8,500	0.05%	1,847
Other in Oceania	400	0.00%	20	400	0.00%	20	300	0.00%	15	300	0.00%	15	300	0.00%	15

=== Enlarged ===
Country (or Region)	2020			2019			2018			2017			2016		
Country (or Region)	Population	pct	pmp	Population	pct	pmp	Population	pct	pmp	Population	pct	pmp	Population	pct	pmp
World	21,005,700	100.00%	2,727	20,876,400	100.00%	2,740	20,687,800	100.00%	2,748	20,499,200	100.00%	2,769	20,368,800	100.00%	2,770
Total Americas	11,155,500	53.11%	11,040	11,156,200	53.44%	11,001	11,178,100	54.03%	11,127	11,177,800	54.53%	11,211	11,177,800	54.88%	11,334
Bermuda	300	0.00%	4,620	300	0.00%	4,920	300	0.00%	4,920	300	0.00%	4,620	300	0.00%	4,680
Canada	550,000	2.62%	14,695	550,000	2.63%	14,788	550,000	2.66%	14,986	550,000	2.68%	15,188	550,000	2.70%	15,366
United States	10,000,000	47.61%	30,386	10,000,000	47.90%	30,491	10,000,000	48.34%	30,737	10,000,000	48.78%	30,877	10,000,000	49.09%	31,140
Total North America	10,550,300	50.23%	28,778	10,550,300	50.54%	28,886	10,550,300	51.00%	29,119	10,550,300	51.47%	29,294	10,550,300	51.80%	29,547
Bahamas	700	0.00%	1,785	700	0.00%	1,750	700	0.00%	1,750	700	0.00%	1,750	700	0.00%	1,750
Barbados	300	0.00%	1,050	—N/a	—N/a	—N/a	—N/a	—N/a	—N/a	—N/a	—N/a	—N/a	—N/a	—N/a	—N/a
Costa Rica	3,100	0.01%	608	3,100	0.01%	620	3,100	0.01%	632	3,100	0.02%	632	3,100	0.02%	645
Cuba	1,500	0.01%	120	1,500	0.01%	150	1,500	0.01%	120	1,500	0.01%	120	1,500	0.01%	150
Dominican Republic	300	0.00%	30	300	0.00%	30	300	0.00%	30	300	0.00%	30	300	0.00%	30
El Salvador	300	0.00%	60	300	0.00%	60	300	0.00%	60	300	0.00%	60	300	0.00%	60
Guatemala	1,500	0.01%	83	1,500	0.01%	83	1,500	0.01%	83	1,500	0.01%	83	1,500	0.01%	100
Jamaica	400	0.00%	144	400	0.00%	140	400	0.00%	140	400	0.00%	140	400	0.00%	140
Mexico	50,000	0.24%	400	50,000	0.24%	388	50,000	0.24%	388	50,000	0.24%	388	50,000	0.25%	388
Netherlands Antilles	700	0.00%	2,188	—N/a	—N/a	—N/a	—N/a	—N/a	—N/a	—N/a	—N/a	—N/a	—N/a	—N/a	—N/a
Panama	12,000	0.06%	2,844	12,000	0.06%	2,856	12,000	0.06%	2,928	12,000	0.06%	3,000	12,000	0.06%	3,000
Puerto Rico	2,500	0.01%	817	2,500	0.01%	750	2,500	0.01%	733	2,500	0.01%	733	2,500	0.01%	717
U.S. Virgin Islands	700	0.00%	6,668	700	0.00%	6,668	700	0.00%	6,668	700	0.00%	6,370	700	0.00%	6,370
Other in Central America, Caribbean	600	0.00%	30	600	0.00%	30	500	0.00%	25	500	0.00%	25	500	0.00%	25
Total Central America, Caribbean	74,600	0.36%	338	—N/a	—N/a	—N/a	74,200	0.36%	338	74,200	0.36%	338	—N/a	—N/a	—N/a
Argentina	310,000	1.48%	6,891	310,000	1.48%	6,958	330,000	1.60%	7,449	330,000	1.61%	7,569	330,000	1.62%	7,780
Bolivia	900	0.00%	72	900	0.00%	72	900	0.00%	90	900	0.00%	90	900	0.00%	90
Brazil	150,000	0.71%	717	150,000	0.72%	713	150,000	0.73%	724	150,000	0.73%	736	150,000	0.74%	732
Chile	24,000	0.11%	1,260	25,000	0.12%	1,339	26,000	0.13%	1,407	26,000	0.13%	1,435	26,000	0.13%	1,449
Colombia	3,500	0.02%	67	3,500	0.02%	67	3,500	0.02%	64	3,200	0.02%	73	3,200	0.02%	70
Ecuador	1,000	0.00%	50	1,000	0.00%	67	1,000	0.00%	67	1,000	0.00%	67	1,000	0.00%	67
Paraguay	1,600	0.01%	218	1,600	0.01%	224	1,600	0.01%	240	1,600	0.01%	224	1,600	0.01%	224
Peru	3,000	0.01%	95	3,000	0.01%	95	3,000	0.01%	95	3,000	0.01%	95	3,000	0.01%	95
Suriname	600	0.00%	990	600	0.00%	990	600	0.00%	990	600	0.00%	1,200	600	0.00%	990
Uruguay	24,000	0.11%	6,822	24,000	0.11%	6,853	25,000	0.12%	7,141	25,000	0.12%	7,145	25,000	0.12%	7,353
Venezuela	12,000	0.06%	420	12,000	0.06%	377	12,000	0.06%	378	12,000	0.06%	395	12,000	0.06%	390
Total South America	530,600	2.53%	1,241	531,600	2.55%	1,243	553,600	2.68%	1,306	553,300	2.70%	1,317	553,300	2.72%	1,330
Total Europe	2,325,300	11.07%	2,799	2,319,400	11.11%	2,804	2,247,000	10.86%	2,716	2,181,900	10.64%	2,665	2,180,900	10.71%	2,654
Austria	17,000	0.08%	1,915	17,000	0.08%	1,938	17,000	0.08%	1,927	17,000	0.08%	1,927	17,000	0.08%	1,983
Belgium	40,000	0.19%	3,490	40,000	0.19%	3,505	40,000	0.19%	3,534	40,000	0.20%	3,536	40,000	0.20%	3,566
Bulgaria	6,000	0.03%	870	6,000	0.03%	870	6,000	0.03%	840	6,000	0.03%	840	6,000	0.03%	840
Croatia	3,100	0.01%	766	3,100	0.01%	748	3,000	0.01%	724	3,000	0.01%	706	3,000	0.01%	706
Cyprus	500	0.00%	400	300	0.00%	240	300	0.00%	240	300	0.00%	240	300	0.00%	240
Czech Republic	6,500	0.03%	617	6,500	0.03%	617	—N/a	—N/a	—N/a	—N/a	—N/a	—N/a	—N/a	—N/a	—N/a
Denmark	8,500	0.04%	1,461	8,500	0.04%	1,461	8,500	0.04%	1,461	8,500	0.04%	1,488	8,500	0.04%	1,488
Estonia	3,500	0.02%	2,634	3,500	0.02%	2,689	3,400	0.02%	2,613	3,400	0.02%	2,618	3,400	0.02%	2,618
Finland	1,900	0.01%	351	1,900	0.01%	351	1,900	0.01%	351	1,900	0.01%	351	1,900	0.01%	351
France	650,000	3.09%	10,026	650,000	3.11%	9,981	600,000	2.90%	9,219	600,000	2.93%	9,276	600,000	2.95%	9,326
Germany	225,000	1.07%	2,708	225,000	1.08%	2,727	225,000	1.09%	2,716	225,000	1.10%	2,723	225,000	1.10%	2,769
Greece	6,000	0.03%	556	6,000	0.03%	571	6,000	0.03%	557	6,000	0.03%	557	6,000	0.03%	516
Hungary	100,000	0.48%	10,233	100,000	0.48%	10,211	100,000	0.48%	10,211	100,000	0.49%	10,211	100,000	0.49%	10,210
Ireland	5,000	0.02%	1,019	5,000	0.02%	1,019	5,000	0.02%	1,038	2,400	0.01%	510	2,400	0.01%	525
Italy	41,000	0.20%	676	41,000	0.20%	673	41,000	0.20%	671	41,000	0.20%	676	40,000	0.20%	642
Latvia	12,000	0.06%	6,267	12,000	0.06%	6,313	12,000	0.06%	6,306	12,000	0.06%	6,000	12,000	0.06%	6,000
Lithuania	7,500	0.04%	2,688	7,500	0.04%	2,688	6,500	0.03%	2,314	6,500	0.03%	2,250	6,500	0.03%	2,239
Luxembourg	1,100	0.01%	1,776	1,000	0.00%	1,667	1,000	0.00%	1,667	1,000	0.00%	1,667	1,000	0.00%	1,667
Malta	300	0.00%	600	300	0.00%	600	300	0.00%	750	300	0.00%	750	300	0.00%	750
Netherlands	700	0.00%	2,188	700	0.00%	2,170	700	0.00%	2,170	700	0.00%	1,913	700	0.00%	1,937
Poland	10,000	0.05%	267	10,000	0.05%	267	10,000	0.05%	267	7,500	0.04%	188	7,500	0.04%	188
Portugal	4,000	0.02%	387	1,000	0.00%	100	1,000	0.00%	100	1,000	0.00%	100	1,000	0.00%	100
Romania	17,000	0.08%	879	17,000	0.08%	869	17,000	0.08%	859	17,000	0.08%	850	17,000	0.08%	859
Slovakia	4,600	0.02%	849	4,600	0.02%	849	4,600	0.02%	849	4,600	0.02%	849	4,600	0.02%	849
Slovenia	300	0.00%	150	300	0.00%	150	300	0.00%	150	300	0.00%	150	300	0.00%	150
Spain	19,000	0.09%	409	18,000	0.09%	385	18,000	0.09%	385	18,000	0.09%	412	18,000	0.09%	381
Sweden	25,000	0.12%	2,433	25,000	0.12%	2,450	25,000	0.12%	2,483	25,000	0.12%	2,533	25,000	0.12%	2,550
Total European Union	1,267,800	6.04%	2,845	1,633,500	7.82%	3,195	1,581,300	7.64%	3,097	1,576,200	7.69%	3,112	1,575,200	7.73%	3,093
Bosnia and Herzegovina	1,100	0.01%	308	1,100	0.01%	308	1,000	0.00%	280	1,000	0.00%	280	1,000	0.00%	280
Channel Islands	300	0.00%	1,770	—N/a	—N/a	—N/a	—N/a	—N/a	—N/a	—N/a	—N/a	—N/a	—N/a	—N/a	—N/a
Gibraltar	1,000	0.00%	28,575	900	0.00%	25,714	800	0.00%	22,853	800	0.00%	26,667	800	0.00%	26,667
Monaco	1,100	0.01%	28,946	—N/a	—N/a	—N/a	—N/a	—N/a	—N/a	—N/a	—N/a	—N/a	—N/a	—N/a	—N/a
North Macedonia	300	0.00%	150	300	0.00%	150	—N/a	—N/a	—N/a	—N/a	—N/a	—N/a	—N/a	—N/a	—N/a
Norway	2,000	0.01%	369	2,000	0.01%	385	2,000	0.01%	385	2,000	0.01%	385	2,000	0.01%	385
Serbia	2,800	0.01%	400	2,800	0.01%	400	2,800	0.01%	400	2,800	0.01%	400	2,800	0.01%	400
Switzerland	25,000	0.12%	2,919	25,000	0.12%	2,946	25,000	0.12%	2,944	25,000	0.12%	2,981	25,000	0.12%	3,019
Turkey	21,000	0.10%	259	21,000	0.10%	255	21,000	0.10%	266	21,000	0.10%	261	21,000	0.10%	271
United Kingdom	370,000	1.76%	5,537	370,000	1.77%	5,550	370,000	1.79%	5,576	370,000	1.80%	5,623	370,000	1.82%	5,665
Other in European Union	600	0.00%	30	600	0.00%	30	500	0.00%	25	500	0.00%	25	500	0.00%	25
Total other Europe	425,000	2.02%	2,330	—N/a	—N/a	—N/a	—N/a	—N/a	—N/a	—N/a	—N/a	—N/a	—N/a	—N/a	—N/a
Belarus	25,000	0.12%	2,647	25,000	0.12%	2,639	25,000	0.12%	2,632	25,000	0.12%	2,625	25,000	0.12%	2,620
Moldova	7,500	0.04%	2,132	7,500	0.04%	2,132	7,500	0.04%	2,100	7,500	0.04%	2,074	7,500	0.04%	1,821
Russia	460,000	2.19%	3,146	460,000	2.20%	3,122	440,000	2.13%	2,993	380,000	1.85%	2,634	380,000	1.87%	2,625
Ukraine	140,000	0.67%	3,329	140,000	0.67%	3,296	140,000	0.68%	3,304	140,000	0.68%	3,275	140,000	0.69%	3,275
Total FSU Republics	632,500	3.01%	3,126	632,500	3.03%	3,136	612,500	2.96%	3,017	552,500	2.70%	2,758	552,500	2.71%	2,747
Total FSU in Europe	655,500	3.12%	3,140	655,500	3.14%	3,154	634,400	3.07%	3,060	574,400	2.80%	2,783	574,400	2.82%	2,771
Total Asia	7,286,200	34.69%	1,616	7,157,100	34.28%	1,602	7,024,000	33.95%	1,587	6,900,800	33.66%	1,585	6,771,400	33.24%	1,572
Israel	6,778,000	32.27%	779,386	6,664,509	31.92%	780,106	6,545,100	31.64%	780,721	6,433,800	31.39%	781,727	6,320,900	31.03%	782,422
West Bank	442,700	2.11%	143,489	427,791	2.05%	141,480	413,200	2.00%	139,504	401,700	1.96%	138,312	385,500	1.89%	136,008
Gaza Strip	0	0.00%	—N/a	0	0.00%	—N/a	0	0.00%	—N/a	0	0.00%	—N/a	0	0.00%	—N/a
Total Israel and Palestine	7,220,700	34.37%	526,463	—N/a	—N/a	—N/a	6,958,300	33.63%	527,732	6,835,500	33.35%	528,912	6,706,400	32.92%	529,588
Total State of Israel	7,220,700	34.37%	790,073	7,092,300	33.97%	790,585	6,958,300	33.63%	791,014	6,835,500	33.35%	791,884	6,706,400	32.92%	792,334
Armenia	500	0.00%	150	500	0.00%	150	500	0.00%	150	300	0.00%	90	—N/a	—N/a	—N/a
Azerbaijan	15,500	0.07%	1,550	15,500	0.07%	1,571	16,000	0.08%	1,621	16,000	0.08%	1,640	16,000	0.08%	1,657
Georgia	5,000	0.02%	1,267	5,000	0.02%	1,267	6,000	0.03%	1,538	6,000	0.03%	1,518	6,000	0.03%	1,569
Kazakhstan	6,500	0.03%	364	6,500	0.03%	350	6,500	0.03%	361	6,500	0.03%	371	6,500	0.03%	381
Kyrgyzstan	1,000	0.00%	150	1,000	0.00%	175	1,000	0.00%	150	1,000	0.00%	175	1,000	0.00%	175
Turkmenistan	600	0.00%	90	600	0.00%	90	600	0.00%	90	400	0.00%	80	400	0.00%	80
Uzbekistan	8,000	0.04%	248	8,000	0.04%	240	8,000	0.04%	250	8,000	0.04%	259	8,000	0.04%	251
Total former USSR in Asia	37,100	0.18%	401	37,100	0.18%	412	38,600	0.19%	434	38,200	0.19%	435	37,900	0.19%	442
China	3,400	0.02%	0	3,400	0.02%	0	3,300	0.02%	0	3,300	0.02%	0	3,300	0.02%	0
India	7,500	0.04%	0	7,500	0.04%	0	7,000	0.03%	0	7,000	0.03%	0	7,000	0.03%	0
Indonesia	300	0.00%	0	300	0.00%	0	300	0.00%	0	300	0.00%	0	300	0.00%	0
Iran	12,000	0.06%	139	12,000	0.06%	145	12,000	0.06%	155	12,000	0.06%	155	12,000	0.06%	147
Japan	1,400	0.01%	14	1,400	0.01%	14	1,400	0.01%	14	1,400	0.01%	14	1,400	0.01%	14
Philippines	300	0.00%	0	300	0.00%	0	300	0.00%	0	300	0.00%	0	300	0.00%	0
Singapore	1,200	0.01%	213	1,200	0.01%	213	1,200	0.01%	213	1,200	0.01%	213	1,200	0.01%	213
South Korea	300	0.00%	0	300	0.00%	0	300	0.00%	0	300	0.00%	0	—N/a	—N/a	—N/a
Syria and Lebanon	300	0.00%	0	—N/a	—N/a	—N/a	—N/a	—N/a	—N/a	—N/a	—N/a	—N/a	—N/a	—N/a	—N/a
Taiwan	300	0.00%	0	300	0.00%	0	300	0.00%	0	300	0.00%	0	300	0.00%	0
Thailand	400	0.00%	0	400	0.00%	0	400	0.00%	0	400	0.00%	0	400	0.00%	0
United Arab Emirates	700	0.00%	70	—N/a	—N/a	—N/a	—N/a	—N/a	—N/a	—N/a	—N/a	—N/a	—N/a	—N/a	—N/a
Other in former USSR in Asia	600	0.00%	30	600	0.00%	30	500	0.00%	25	500	0.00%	25	500	0.00%	25
Total other Asia	28,400	0.14%	0	27,700	0.13%	0	27,100	0.13%	0	27,100	0.13%	0	27,100	0.13%	0
Total Africa	83,900	0.40%	59	88,900	0.43%	74	88,900	0.43%	72	88,900	0.43%	72	88,900	0.44%	72
Egypt	300	0.00%	0	300	0.00%	0	300	0.00%	0	300	0.00%	0	300	0.00%	0
Ethiopia	1,000	0.00%	0	1,000	0.00%	0	1,000	0.00%	0	1,000	0.00%	0	1,000	0.00%	0
Morocco	2,800	0.01%	80	2,800	0.01%	80	2,700	0.01%	75	2,700	0.01%	74	2,700	0.01%	82
Tunisia	1,400	0.01%	126	1,400	0.01%	126	1,300	0.01%	111	1,300	0.01%	118	1,300	0.01%	118
Total Northern Africa	5,500	0.03%	17	5,500	0.03%	17	5,300	0.03%	16	5,300	0.03%	15	5,300	0.03%	15
Botswana	300	0.00%	120	300	0.00%	150	300	0.00%	120	300	0.00%	150	300	0.00%	150
DR Congo	300	0.00%	0	300	0.00%	0	300	0.00%	0	300	0.00%	0	300	0.00%	0
Kenya	700	0.00%	23	700	0.00%	23	700	0.00%	23	700	0.00%	23	700	0.00%	23
Madagascar	300	0.00%	0	300	0.00%	0	300	0.00%	0	300	0.00%	0	300	0.00%	0
Namibia	300	0.00%	120	300	0.00%	120	300	0.00%	120	300	0.00%	120	300	0.00%	120
Nigeria	300	0.00%	0	300	0.00%	0	300	0.00%	0	300	0.00%	0	300	0.00%	0
South Africa	75,000	0.36%	1,276	80,000	0.38%	1,387	80,000	0.39%	1,414	80,000	0.39%	1,431	80,000	0.39%	1,450
Zimbabwe	600	0.00%	30	600	0.00%	30	800	0.00%	40	800	0.00%	40	800	0.00%	40
Other in Sub-Saharan Africa	600	0.00%	30	600	0.00%	30	500	0.00%	25	500	0.00%	25	500	0.00%	25
Total Sub-Saharan Africa	78,400	0.37%	88	83,400	0.40%	85	83,600	0.40%	95	83,600	0.41%	95	83,600	0.41%	94
Total Oceania	154,800	0.74%	3,648	154,800	0.74%	3,771	149,800	0.72%	3,565	149,800	0.73%	3,745	149,800	0.74%	3,751
Australia	145,000	0.69%	5,726	145,000	0.69%	6,021	140,000	0.68%	5,716	140,000	0.68%	5,813	140,000	0.69%	5,860
New Zealand	9,500	0.05%	1,913	9,500	0.05%	1,938	9,500	0.05%	1,976	9,500	0.05%	2,027	9,500	0.05%	2,065
Other in Oceania	600	0.00%	30	600	0.00%	30	500	0.00%	25	500	0.00%	25	500	0.00%	25

=== Eligible ===
Country (or Region)	2020			2019			2018			2017			2016		
Country (or Region)	Population	pct	pmp	Population	pct	pmp	Population	pct	pmp	Population	pct	pmp	Population	pct	pmp
World	23,809,100	100.00%	3,091	23,674,400	100.00%	3,107	23,472,400	100.00%	3,118	23,311,000	100.00%	3,149	23,170,500	100.00%	3,151
America Total	13,416,700	56.35%	13,278	13,418,300	56.68%	13,232	13,407,400	57.12%	13,346	13,406,500	57.51%	13,447	13,401,500	57.84%	13,589
Bermuda	400	0.00%	6,160	400	0.00%	6,560	400	0.00%	6,560	400	0.00%	6,160	400	0.00%	6,240
Canada	700,000	2.94%	18,702	700,000	2.96%	18,821	700,000	2.98%	19,073	700,000	3.00%	19,331	700,000	3.02%	19,557
United States	12,000,000	50.40%	36,463	12,000,000	50.69%	36,589	12,000,000	51.12%	36,884	12,000,000	51.48%	37,053	12,000,000	51.79%	37,368
Total North America	12,700,400	53.34%	34,643	12,700,400	53.65%	34,773	12,700,400	54.11%	35,053	12,700,400	54.48%	35,264	12,700,400	54.81%	35,568
Bahamas	900	0.00%	2,295	900	0.00%	2,250	800	0.00%	2,000	800	0.00%	2,000	800	0.00%	2,000
Barbados	400	0.00%	1,400	—N/a	—N/a	—N/a	—N/a	—N/a	—N/a	—N/a	—N/a	—N/a	—N/a	—N/a	—N/a
Costa Rica	3,400	0.01%	666	3,400	0.01%	680	3,400	0.01%	694	3,400	0.01%	694	3,400	0.01%	707
Cuba	2,000	0.01%	160	2,000	0.01%	200	2,000	0.01%	160	2,000	0.01%	160	2,000	0.01%	200
Dominican Republic	400	0.00%	40	400	0.00%	40	400	0.00%	40	400	0.00%	40	400	0.00%	40
El Salvador	400	0.00%	80	400	0.00%	80	400	0.00%	80	400	0.00%	80	400	0.00%	80
Guatemala	1,800	0.01%	100	1,800	0.01%	100	1,800	0.01%	100	1,800	0.01%	100	1,800	0.01%	120
Jamaica	500	0.00%	180	500	0.00%	175	500	0.00%	175	500	0.00%	175	500	0.00%	175
Mexico	65,000	0.27%	520	65,000	0.27%	504	65,000	0.28%	504	65,000	0.28%	504	65,000	0.28%	504
Netherlands Antilles	900	0.00%	2,813	—N/a	—N/a	—N/a	—N/a	—N/a	—N/a	—N/a	—N/a	—N/a	—N/a	—N/a	—N/a
Panama	13,000	0.05%	3,081	13,000	0.05%	3,094	13,000	0.06%	3,172	13,000	0.06%	3,250	13,000	0.06%	3,250
Puerto Rico	3,000	0.01%	980	3,000	0.01%	900	3,000	0.01%	880	3,000	0.01%	880	3,000	0.01%	860
U.S. Virgin Islands	800	0.00%	7,620	800	0.00%	7,620	800	0.00%	7,620	800	0.00%	7,280	800	0.00%	7,280
Other in Central America, Caribbean	800	0.00%	40	800	0.00%	40	700	0.00%	35	700	0.00%	35	700	0.00%	35
Total Central America, Caribbean	93,300	0.39%	423	—N/a	—N/a	—N/a	92,600	0.39%	422	92,600	0.40%	422	—N/a	—N/a	—N/a
Argentina	360,000	1.51%	8,002	360,000	1.52%	8,080	350,000	1.49%	7,901	350,000	1.50%	8,028	350,000	1.51%	8,251
Bolivia	1,100	0.00%	88	1,100	0.00%	88	1,000	0.00%	100	1,000	0.00%	100	1,000	0.00%	100
Brazil	180,000	0.76%	861	180,000	0.76%	855	180,000	0.77%	869	180,000	0.77%	883	175,000	0.76%	855
Chile	28,000	0.12%	1,470	30,000	0.13%	1,607	30,000	0.13%	1,623	30,000	0.13%	1,656	30,000	0.13%	1,672
Colombia	4,500	0.02%	86	4,500	0.02%	86	4,500	0.02%	82	3,600	0.02%	82	3,600	0.02%	78
Ecuador	1,200	0.01%	60	1,200	0.01%	80	1,200	0.01%	80	1,200	0.01%	80	1,200	0.01%	80
Paraguay	1,900	0.01%	259	1,900	0.01%	266	1,900	0.01%	285	1,900	0.01%	266	1,900	0.01%	266
Peru	3,500	0.01%	111	3,500	0.01%	111	3,500	0.01%	111	3,500	0.02%	111	3,500	0.02%	111
Suriname	800	0.00%	1,320	800	0.00%	1,320	800	0.00%	1,320	800	0.00%	1,600	800	0.00%	1,320
Uruguay	28,000	0.12%	7,959	28,000	0.12%	7,995	27,500	0.12%	7,855	27,500	0.12%	7,859	27,500	0.12%	8,088
Venezuela	14,000	0.06%	490	14,000	0.06%	440	14,000	0.06%	441	14,000	0.06%	461	14,000	0.06%	455
Others in South America	623,000	2.62%	1,457	625,000	2.64%	1,461	614,400	2.62%	1,449	613,500	2.63%	1,460	608,500	2.63%	1,463
Total Europe	2,820,800	11.85%	3,395	2,813,800	11.89%	3,401	2,759,700	11.76%	3,336	2,722,500	11.68%	3,325	2,716,500	11.72%	3,306
Austria	20,000	0.08%	2,252	20,000	0.08%	2,280	20,000	0.09%	2,267	20,000	0.09%	2,267	20,000	0.09%	2,333
Belgium	45,000	0.19%	3,926	45,000	0.19%	3,943	45,000	0.19%	3,976	45,000	0.19%	3,978	45,000	0.19%	4,012
Bulgaria	8,000	0.03%	1,160	8,000	0.03%	1,160	7,500	0.03%	1,050	7,500	0.03%	1,050	7,500	0.03%	1,050
Croatia	3,800	0.02%	939	3,800	0.02%	916	3,500	0.01%	844	3,500	0.02%	824	3,500	0.02%	824
Cyprus	600	0.00%	480	400	0.00%	320	400	0.00%	320	400	0.00%	320	400	0.00%	320
Czech Republic	8,000	0.03%	759	8,000	0.03%	759	—N/a	—N/a	—N/a	—N/a	—N/a	—N/a	—N/a	—N/a	—N/a
Denmark	9,500	0.04%	1,633	9,500	0.04%	1,633	9,500	0.04%	1,633	9,500	0.04%	1,663	9,500	0.04%	1,663
Estonia	4,500	0.02%	3,387	4,500	0.02%	3,458	4,500	0.02%	3,458	4,500	0.02%	3,465	4,500	0.02%	3,465
Finland	2,200	0.01%	406	2,200	0.01%	406	2,200	0.01%	406	2,200	0.01%	406	2,200	0.01%	406
France	750,000	3.15%	11,568	750,000	3.17%	11,517	700,000	2.98%	10,755	700,000	3.00%	10,822	700,000	3.02%	10,880
Germany	275,000	1.16%	3,309	275,000	1.16%	3,333	275,000	1.17%	3,319	275,000	1.18%	3,328	275,000	1.19%	3,385
Greece	7,000	0.03%	649	7,000	0.03%	667	7,000	0.03%	650	7,000	0.03%	650	7,000	0.03%	602
Hungary	130,000	0.55%	13,303	130,000	0.55%	13,275	130,000	0.55%	13,274	130,000	0.56%	13,274	130,000	0.56%	13,273
Ireland	6,500	0.03%	1,324	6,500	0.03%	1,325	7,000	0.03%	1,454	2,800	0.01%	595	2,800	0.01%	613
Italy	48,000	0.20%	791	48,000	0.20%	788	48,000	0.20%	785	48,000	0.21%	791	45,000	0.19%	723
Latvia	16,000	0.07%	8,356	16,000	0.07%	8,417	16,000	0.07%	8,409	16,000	0.07%	8,000	16,000	0.07%	8,000
Lithuania	10,500	0.04%	3,763	10,500	0.04%	3,763	10,000	0.04%	3,560	10,000	0.04%	3,462	10,000	0.04%	3,444
Luxembourg	1,300	0.01%	2,099	1,200	0.01%	2,000	1,200	0.01%	2,000	1,200	0.01%	2,000	1,200	0.01%	2,000
Malta	400	0.00%	800	400	0.00%	800	400	0.00%	1,000	400	0.00%	1,000	400	0.00%	1,000
Netherlands	900	0.00%	2,813	900	0.00%	2,790	800	0.00%	2,480	800	0.00%	2,187	800	0.00%	2,213
Poland	13,000	0.05%	347	13,000	0.05%	347	13,000	0.06%	347	10,000	0.04%	250	10,000	0.04%	250
Portugal	5,000	0.02%	484	1,200	0.01%	120	1,200	0.01%	120	1,200	0.01%	120	1,200	0.01%	120
Romania	20,000	0.08%	1,034	20,000	0.08%	1,022	20,000	0.09%	1,011	20,000	0.09%	1,000	20,000	0.09%	1,011
Slovakia	6,000	0.03%	1,108	6,000	0.03%	1,108	6,000	0.03%	1,108	6,000	0.03%	1,108	6,000	0.03%	1,108
Slovenia	400	0.00%	200	400	0.00%	200	400	0.00%	200	400	0.00%	200	400	0.00%	200
Spain	22,000	0.09%	474	21,000	0.09%	449	20,000	0.09%	427	20,000	0.09%	458	20,000	0.09%	424
Sweden	30,000	0.13%	2,920	30,000	0.13%	2,940	30,000	0.13%	2,980	30,000	0.13%	3,040	30,000	0.13%	3,060
Total European Union	1,505,700	6.32%	3,379	1,910,600	8.07%	3,737	1,855,800	7.91%	3,634	1,848,600	7.93%	3,650	1,842,600	7.95%	3,618
Bosnia and Herzegovina	1,400	0.01%	392	1,400	0.01%	392	1,200	0.01%	336	1,200	0.01%	336	1,200	0.01%	336
Channel Islands	400	0.00%	2,360	—N/a	—N/a	—N/a	—N/a	—N/a	—N/a	—N/a	—N/a	—N/a	—N/a	—N/a	—N/a
Gibraltar	1,100	0.00%	31,433	1,000	0.00%	28,571	900	0.00%	25,710	900	0.00%	30,000	900	0.00%	30,000
Monaco	1,300	0.01%	34,209	—N/a	—N/a	—N/a	—N/a	—N/a	—N/a	—N/a	—N/a	—N/a	—N/a	—N/a	—N/a
North Macedonia	400	0.00%	200	400	0.00%	200	—N/a	—N/a	—N/a	—N/a	—N/a	—N/a	—N/a	—N/a	—N/a
Norway	2,500	0.01%	462	2,500	0.01%	481	2,500	0.01%	481	2,500	0.01%	481	2,500	0.01%	481
Serbia	3,500	0.01%	500	3,500	0.01%	500	3,500	0.01%	500	3,500	0.02%	500	3,500	0.02%	500
Switzerland	28,000	0.12%	3,269	28,000	0.12%	3,299	28,000	0.12%	3,297	28,000	0.12%	3,339	28,000	0.12%	3,381
Turkey	23,000	0.10%	284	23,000	0.10%	280	23,000	0.10%	291	23,000	0.10%	286	23,000	0.10%	297
United Kingdom	410,000	1.72%	6,136	410,000	1.73%	6,150	410,000	1.75%	6,178	410,000	1.76%	6,231	410,000	1.77%	6,277
Other in European Union	800	0.00%	40	800	0.00%	40	700	0.00%	35	700	0.00%	35	700	0.00%	35
Total other Europe	472,100	1.98%	2,588	—N/a	—N/a	—N/a	—N/a	—N/a	—N/a	—N/a	—N/a	—N/a	—N/a	—N/a	—N/a
Belarus	33,000	0.14%	3,494	33,000	0.14%	3,483	33,000	0.14%	3,474	33,000	0.14%	3,465	33,000	0.14%	3,459
Moldova	10,000	0.04%	2,842	10,000	0.04%	2,842	11,000	0.05%	3,080	11,000	0.05%	3,041	11,000	0.05%	2,671
Russia	600,000	2.52%	4,103	600,000	2.53%	4,073	600,000	2.56%	4,081	570,000	2.45%	3,951	570,000	2.46%	3,938
Ukraine	200,000	0.84%	4,756	200,000	0.84%	4,708	200,000	0.85%	4,720	200,000	0.86%	4,679	200,000	0.86%	4,679
Total FSU Republics	843,000	3.54%	4,167	843,000	3.56%	4,179	844,000	3.60%	4,157	814,000	3.49%	4,063	814,000	3.51%	4,047
Total FSU in Europe	874,000	3.67%	4,187	874,000	3.69%	4,205	874,500	3.73%	4,217	844,500	3.62%	4,092	844,500	3.64%	4,074
Total Asia	7,303,600	30.68%	1,620	7,174,300	30.30%	1,606	7,042,000	30.00%	1,591	6,918,700	29.68%	1,589	6,789,200	29.30%	1,576
Israel	6,778,000	28.47%	779,386	6,664,509	28.15%	780,106	6,545,100	27.88%	780,721	6,433,800	27.60%	781,727	6,320,900	27.28%	782,422
West Bank	442,700	1.86%	143,489	427,791	1.81%	141,480	413,200	1.76%	139,504	401,700	1.72%	138,312	385,500	1.66%	136,008
Gaza Strip	0	0.00%	—N/a	0	0.00%	—N/a	0	0.00%	—N/a	0	0.00%	—N/a	0	0.00%	—N/a
Total Israel and Palestine	7,220,700	30.33%	526,463	—N/a	—N/a	—N/a	6,958,300	29.64%	527,732	6,835,500	29.32%	528,912	6,706,400	28.94%	529,588
Total State of Israel	7,220,700	30.33%	790,073	7,092,300	29.96%	790,585	6,958,300	29.64%	791,014	6,835,500	29.32%	791,884	6,706,400	28.94%	792,334
Armenia	700	0.00%	210	700	0.00%	210	700	0.00%	210	400	0.00%	120	—N/a	—N/a	—N/a
Azerbaijan	20,500	0.09%	2,050	20,500	0.09%	2,077	22,000	0.09%	2,228	22,000	0.09%	2,254	22,000	0.09%	2,279
Georgia	7,500	0.03%	1,900	7,500	0.03%	1,900	8,700	0.04%	2,229	8,700	0.04%	2,201	8,700	0.04%	2,275
Kazakhstan	9,500	0.04%	532	9,500	0.04%	512	9,600	0.04%	533	9,600	0.04%	549	9,600	0.04%	563
Kyrgyzstan	1,500	0.01%	225	1,500	0.01%	263	1,500	0.01%	225	1,500	0.01%	263	1,500	0.01%	263
Turkmenistan	800	0.00%	120	800	0.00%	120	800	0.00%	120	600	0.00%	120	600	0.00%	120
Uzbekistan	10,000	0.04%	310	10,000	0.04%	300	10,000	0.04%	313	10,000	0.04%	324	10,000	0.04%	314
Total former USSR in Asia	50,500	0.21%	546	50,500	0.21%	561	53,300	0.23%	600	52,800	0.23%	601	52,400	0.23%	611
China	3,600	0.02%	0	3,600	0.02%	0	3,500	0.01%	0	3,500	0.02%	0	3,500	0.02%	0
India	9,000	0.04%	0	9,000	0.04%	0	8,000	0.03%	0	8,000	0.03%	0	8,000	0.03%	0
Indonesia	400	0.00%	0	400	0.00%	0	400	0.00%	0	400	0.00%	0	400	0.00%	0
Iran	13,000	0.05%	151	13,000	0.05%	157	13,000	0.06%	168	13,000	0.06%	168	13,000	0.06%	159
Japan	1,600	0.01%	16	1,600	0.01%	16	1,600	0.01%	16	1,600	0.01%	16	1,600	0.01%	16
Philippines	400	0.00%	0	400	0.00%	0	400	0.00%	0	400	0.00%	0	400	0.00%	0
Singapore	1,400	0.01%	249	1,400	0.01%	249	1,400	0.01%	249	1,400	0.01%	249	1,400	0.01%	249
South Korea	400	0.00%	0	400	0.00%	0	400	0.00%	0	400	0.00%	0	—N/a	—N/a	—N/a
Syria and Lebanon	400	0.00%	0	—N/a	—N/a	—N/a	—N/a	—N/a	—N/a	—N/a	—N/a	—N/a	—N/a	—N/a	—N/a
Taiwan	400	0.00%	0	400	0.00%	0	400	0.00%	0	400	0.00%	0	400	0.00%	0
Thailand	500	0.00%	0	500	0.00%	0	500	0.00%	0	500	0.00%	0	500	0.00%	0
United Arab Emirates	900	0.00%	90	—N/a	—N/a	—N/a	—N/a	—N/a	—N/a	—N/a	—N/a	—N/a	—N/a	—N/a	—N/a
Other in former USSR in Asia	800	0.00%	40	800	0.00%	40	700	0.00%	35	700	0.00%	35	700	0.00%	35
Total other Asia	32,400	0.14%	0	31,500	0.13%	0	30,400	0.13%	0	30,400	0.13%	0	30,400	0.13%	0
Total Africa	97,100	0.41%	68	97,100	0.41%	81	96,900	0.41%	79	96,900	0.42%	79	96,900	0.42%	78
Egypt	400	0.00%	0	400	0.00%	0	400	0.00%	0	400	0.00%	0	400	0.00%	0
Ethiopia	2,500	0.01%	0	2,500	0.01%	0	2,500	0.01%	0	2,500	0.01%	0	2,500	0.01%	0
Morocco	3,100	0.01%	89	3,100	0.01%	89	2,900	0.01%	81	2,900	0.01%	79	2,900	0.01%	88
Tunisia	1,600	0.01%	144	1,600	0.01%	144	1,400	0.01%	120	1,400	0.01%	127	1,400	0.01%	127
Total Northern Africa	7,600	0.03%	23	7,600	0.03%	23	7,200	0.03%	21	7,200	0.03%	21	7,200	0.03%	20
Botswana	400	0.00%	160	400	0.00%	200	400	0.00%	160	400	0.00%	200	400	0.00%	200
DR Congo	400	0.00%	0	400	0.00%	0	400	0.00%	0	400	0.00%	0	400	0.00%	0
Kenya	900	0.00%	30	900	0.00%	30	900	0.00%	30	900	0.00%	30	900	0.00%	30
Madagascar	400	0.00%	0	400	0.00%	0	400	0.00%	0	400	0.00%	0	400	0.00%	0
Namibia	400	0.00%	160	400	0.00%	160	400	0.00%	160	400	0.00%	160	400	0.00%	160
Nigeria	400	0.00%	0	400	0.00%	0	400	0.00%	0	400	0.00%	0	400	0.00%	0
South Africa	85,000	0.36%	1,446	85,000	0.36%	1,473	85,000	0.36%	1,503	85,000	0.36%	1,521	85,000	0.37%	1,541
Zimbabwe	800	0.00%	40	800	0.00%	40	1,000	0.00%	50	1,000	0.00%	50	1,000	0.00%	50
Other in Sub-Saharan Africa	800	0.00%	40	800	0.00%	40	700	0.00%	35	700	0.00%	35	700	0.00%	35
Total Sub-Saharan Africa	89,500	0.38%	100	89,500	0.38%	91	89,700	0.38%	102	89,700	0.38%	102	89,700	0.39%	101
Total Oceania	170,900	0.72%	4,028	170,900	0.72%	4,164	166,400	0.71%	3,961	166,400	0.71%	4,160	166,400	0.72%	4,167
Australia	160,000	0.67%	6,319	160,000	0.68%	6,644	155,000	0.66%	6,328	155,000	0.66%	6,436	155,000	0.67%	6,488
New Zealand	10,500	0.04%	2,114	10,500	0.04%	2,142	11,000	0.05%	2,288	11,000	0.05%	2,347	11,000	0.05%	2,391
Other in Oceania	800	0.00%	40	800	0.00%	40	700	0.00%	35	700	0.00%	35	700	0.00%	35

== See also ==
- Jewish population by country
- Historical Jewish population comparisons
