= Israel–Kyrgyzstan relations =

- Israel: Kyrgyzstan

Israel–Kyrgyzstan relations refers to the current and historical relations between Israel and Kyrgyzstan. Israel and Kyrgyzstan have established relations on 4 March 1992.

Israel is represented in Kyrgyzstan via the Israeli embassy in Astana, Kazakhstan, and Kyrgyzstan is represented in Israel via the Kyrgyz embassy in Ankara, Turkey.

== History ==
After the dissolution of the Soviet Union, Israel and Kyrgyzstan established relations on 4 March 1992. In 1993 Kyrgyzstan considered to open an embassy in Jerusalem. In 2018 the Kyrgyz Deputy Speaker of the Parliament, Asel Koduranova, and head of the Kyrgyzstan-Israel parliamentary friendship group, MP Irina Karamushkina, met with Israeli lawmaker, Akram Hasson, who is also a Chairman of the Israel-Kyrgyzstan parliamentary friendship group, discussing the option to open a Kyrgyz embassy in Israel.

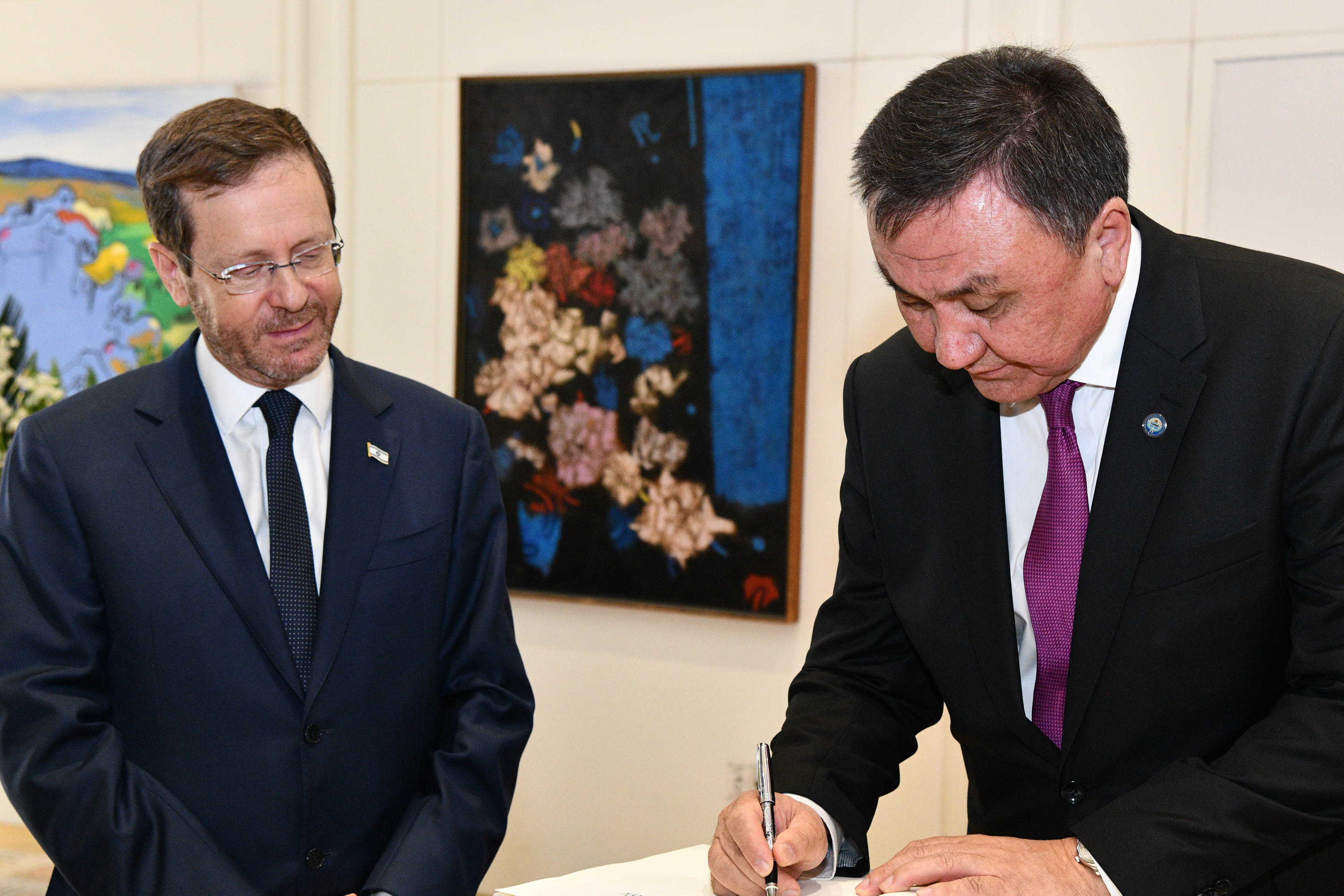
The Kyrgyz ambassador, Kubanychbek Omuraliev (right), meets with the Israeli president, Isaac Herzog (left), in the presidential office in Jerusalem 2022.

== Economic relations ==
In June 2014 the Kyrgyz Minister of Agriculture, Zhanybek Kerimaliev, signed a memorandum with the Israeli company "Emi Technologies & Financing" which the company will build logistics centers in Kyrgyzstan. In September 2014 the Kyrgyz Minister of Economy, Temir Sariev and the Director of the Department "Eurasia 2" (Central Asia and the Caucasus) of the Ministry of Foreign Affairs of the State of Israel Mr. O. Yosef, meet and discussed the further co-operation between the countries and that Israel is willing to share its experience in the field of healthcare, agriculture and IT technologies with Kyrgyzstan.

== Cultural relations ==
In November 2016 an Israeli Film Festival was held in Bishkek.

== Israeli Aid ==
After the 2010 South Kyrgyzstan ethnic clashes, Israel sent humanitarian aid to the region.

On the 23 August 2010, The Israeli ambassador Izrael-Mei-Ami met with the Kyrgyz Minister of Agriculture, Mamatsharip Turdukulov, discussing cooperation and further Israeli aid in the field of agriculture.

In August 2015 a group of Israeli ophthalmologists visited Kyrgyzstan to provide treatment to Kyrgyz citizens free of charge. The Israeli ophthalmologists have also meet with the Kyrgyz Health Minister Talantbek Batyraliev, who thanked the group and discussed with them on further co-operation of trainings by Israeli specialists in Kyrgyzstan.

== See also ==
- Foreign relations of Israel
- Foreign relations of Kyrgyzstan
- History of the Jews in Kyrgyzstan
