= History of the Jews in Uzbekistan =

Uzbek Jews
Total population
- 9,865

Languages
- Bukhori, Uzbek, Russian, and Yiddish

Religion
- Judaism

Related ethnic groups
- Other Bukharan Jews; Russian Jews, Ashkenazi Jews

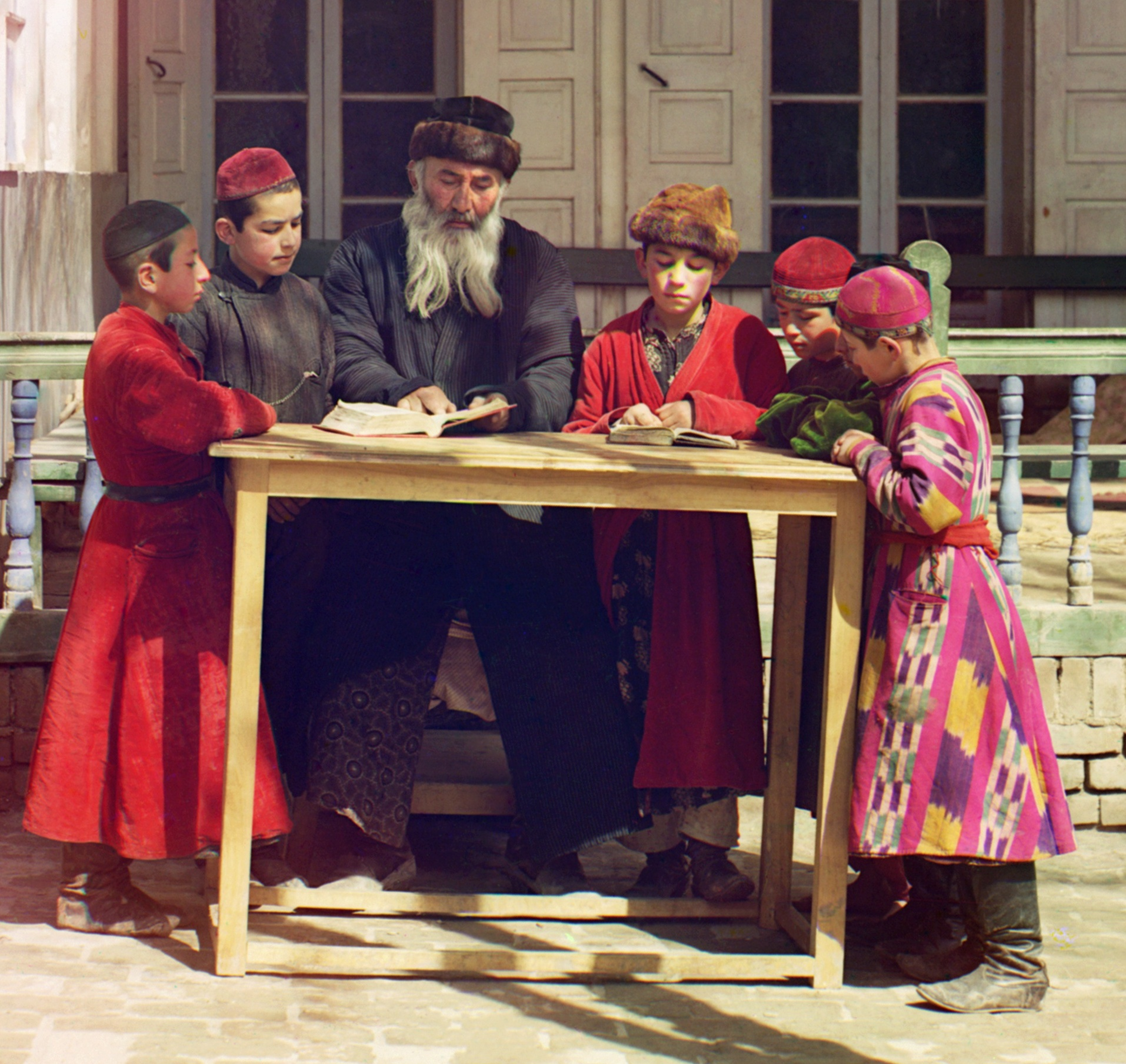
Jewish children with their teacher in Samarkand. Photograph taken by Sergey Prokudin-Gorsky sometime between 1909 and 1915.

The history of the Jews in Uzbekistan refers to the history of two distinct communities; the more religious and traditional Bukharan Jewish community and the Ashkenazi community, most of whom who migrated during Soviet times.

There were 94,900 Jews in Uzbekistan in 1989, but fewer than 10,000 remained in 2021 (around 38% of which lived in Tashkent). Most of the remaining Jews are Ashkenazi.

There are 12 synagogues in Uzbekistan.

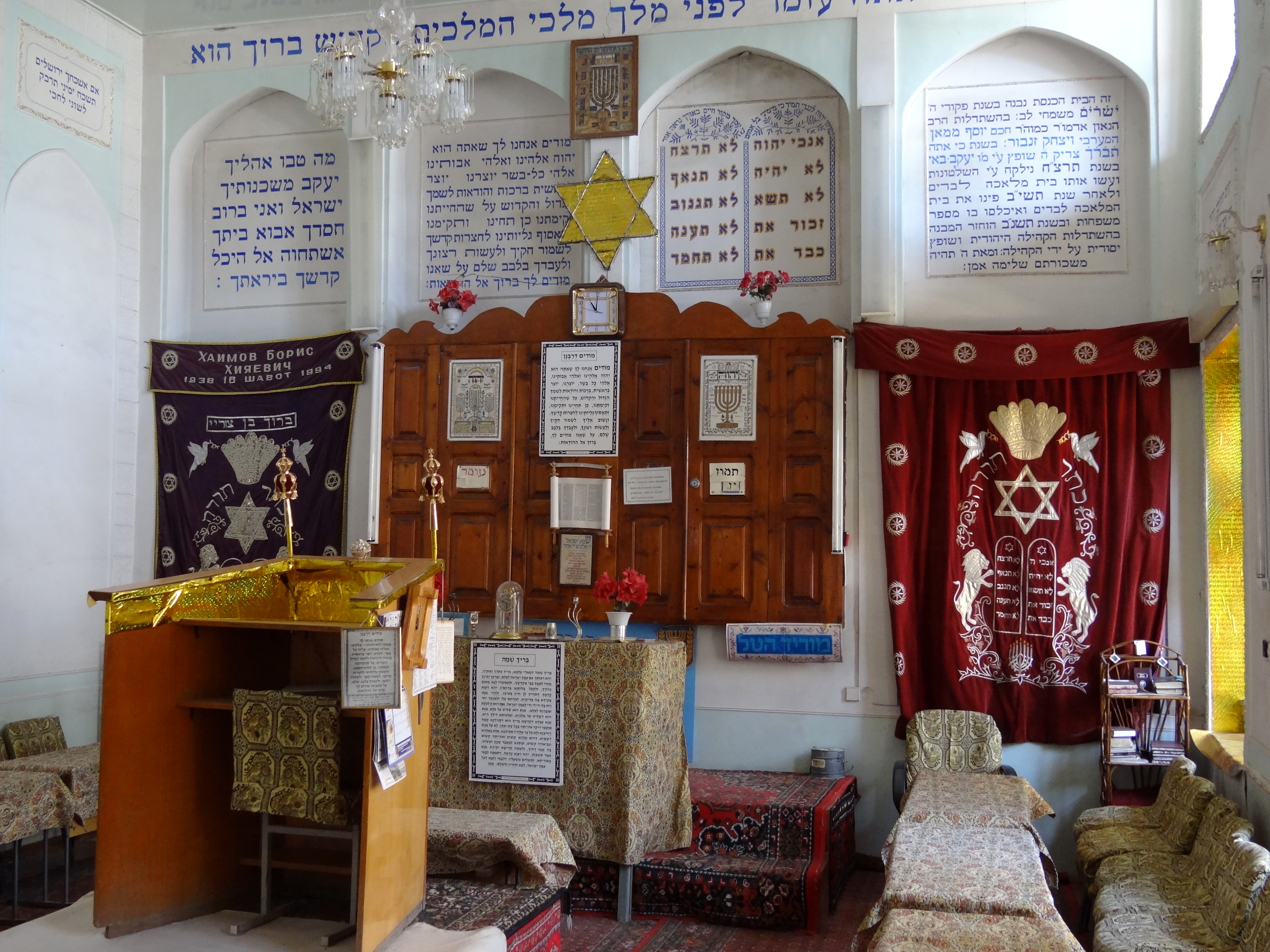
Interior of the Synagogue of Bukhara

== Fergana Jewish community ==
Semyon Abdurakhmanov is the head of the Fergana Jewish community. There are six synagogues in the Valley. There are several hundred Jews in Fergana, Namangan, and Kokand, with about 1,300 total in the area. Abdurakhmanov has said that the biggest problem faced by the Jewish Uzbek community is the economy.

During the Andijan Massacre in May 2005, the Israeli Embassy in Tashkent asked Abdurakhmanov to make a list of Jews "in case there will be a need to airlift people to Israel".

== Historical demographics ==
Historical Uzbek Jewish population
Year	Pop.	±%
1926	37,896	—
1939	50,676	+33.7%
1959	94,488	+86.5%
1970	103,058	+9.1%
1979	100,067	−2.9%
1989	95,104	−5.0%
2021	9,865	−89.6%
Source: The Jewish population data includes Mountain Jews, Georgian Jews, Bukharan Jews (or Central Asian Jews), Krymchaks (all per the 1959 Soviet census), and Tats.

The Jewish population of Uzbekistan (then the Uzbek SSR) nearly tripled between 1926 and 1970, then slowly declined between 1970 and 1989, followed by a much more rapid decline since 1989, when the collapse of Communism began. According to the Soviet census, there were 103,000 Jews in Uzbekistan in 1970.

Between 1989 and 2021, around ninety percent of Uzbekistan's Jewish population left Uzbekistan and moved to other countries, mostly to Israel.

In the 2021 census, there were almost 10,000 Jews in Uzbekistan, diffused over the country. Over 1,000 were in Bukhara, and almost 1,500 were in Samarkand; around 1,300 were in Fergana, and over 3,700 were in Tashkent. The remaining 2,300 were spread around the country in smaller numbers. Most of the remaining Jews are Ashkenazi.

In July 2020, Absolute Business Trade sought to demolish Ashkenazi Synagogue of Tashkent, the oldest functioning Ashkenazi synagogue, for a luxury apartment complex. The company filed a lawsuit against the Jewish Ashkenazi Community of Tashkent, alleging it was "illegally occupying" the site, which had been purchased by Golden House. Orient Group, the parent company of Absolute Business Trade and Golden House, offered to construct a new synagogue for the community, who declined the proposal. Tashkent's then-mayor, Rakhmonbek Usmanov, assured that the synagogue would not be evicted but had left the position. At a hearing in August, Absolute Business Trade withdrew its lawsuit in response to international outcry.

== See also ==
- History of the Jews in Central Asia
