= History of the Jews in Paraguay =

Paraguayan Jews Judeoparaguayos (Spanish) יהודים בפרגוואי (Hebrew) Judeo-paraguaiguakuéra (Guarani)
- Location of Paraguay in South America

Total population
- 1,000

Regions with significant populations
- Asunción

Languages
- Spanish, Guaraní, Hebrew, Yiddish

Religion
- Judaism

Related ethnic groups
- Argentine Jews, Brazilian Jews, Ashkenazi Jews

The history of the Jews in Paraguay has been characterised by migration of Jewish people, mainly from European countries, to the South American nation, and has resulted in the Jewish Paraguayan community numbering 1,000 today.

Migration began primarily from Europe in the late 19th century, where the first waves of Jewish immigrants to Paraguay came from countries such as France and Italy. This was largely a result of liberal immigration policies after the Paraguayan War, which had decimated Paraguay's prewar population.

During the 1920s, Jews from Poland and Ukraine arrived in Paraguay, and in the 1930s there was a wave of mass immigration of approximately 20,000 Jews from Germany. Jewish immigration to Paraguay increased during World War II, as many sought temporary refuge in the nation before attempting to seek entry into neighbouring countries, such as Argentina and Brazil. Following World War II, Israel and Paraguay opened diplomatic relations in 1949, however in 1970, the Israeli Embassy in Asunción was attacked. This event was largely attributable to the Arab-Israeli conflict, which had a profound impact on the Paraguayan Jewish community.

The Jewish community, who mostly reside in the capital Asunción, has ultimately had a significant influence on the Paraguayan community, both culturally and politically. There have been various political disagreements between the Paraguayan Jewish community and Israel, which have affected Paraguayan-Israel relations. In terms of cultural influence, the Jewish Paraguayan community has established various synagogues in Asunción. Furthermore, various literature and films have been created to depict Jewish European immigration to Paraguayan, many of them made since 2005.

== Migration history overview ==
In the late 19th century, Jewish immigrants arrived in Paraguay from European countries such as Italy and France. During World War I, Jews from Palestine (Jerusalem), Egypt and Turkey arrived in Paraguay, mostly Sephardi Jews. In the 1920s, there was a second wave of immigrants from Ukraine and Poland. Between 1933 and 1939, Jews from Germany, Austria and Czechoslovakia took advantage of Paraguay's liberal immigration laws to escape from Nazi-occupied Europe. After World War II, most Jews that arrived in Paraguay were survivors of concentration camps. In the 1960s, approximately 40,000 Germans and their descendants, a majority of whom were Nazi supporters and some of whom were prominent Nazi figures, were temporarily living in Paraguay. For instance, infamous Nazi doctor Josef Mengele also temporarily lived in the country. Today, the majority of the Paraguayan Jewish community is of Ashkenazi background.

== First Jewish arrivals - late nineteenth century immigration ==
Paraguay has been a long-time supporter of Jewish people and their rights. In 1881, Paraguayan media published news about the persecution of Jewish people in Europe, raising awareness of widespread discrimination.

Paraguay has also had a liberal immigration policy since the 1870s, as a result of the Paraguayan War, also known as the Triple Alliance Conflict. The war of the Triple Alliance (1864-1870) was waged by Brazil, Argentina and Uruguay against Paraguay. The British government supported the allies in this war with economic and military resources. By the war's conclusion in 1870, Paraguay's political and economic framework was significantly weakened. Its strength as an independent nation was also severely impacted as it permanently lost territory around the Gran Chaco area. Furthermore, the conflict resulted in two-thirds of Paraguay's citizens perishing. As such, after peace was attained, in order to encourage immigration and recover from large population losses, the Paraguayan government created a clause in their 1870 Constitution that offered religious freedom in the territory.

These factors, specifically the country's liberal immigration policy and 1870 constitution clause, culminated in an increase in Jews seeking refuge in Paraguay. As such, in the 1890s, Jewish people emigrated initially from France and Italy to seek temporary or permanent residency in Paraguay, seeing an opportunity to escape discrimination in Europe. Paraguay has historically acted as a temporary destination for many Jewish migrants seeking to gain entry into other South American nations, such as Brazil, Argentina and Uruguay. This was due to stricter immigration policies in these neighbouring countries during the 19th century, which caused some Jewish immigrants to permanently remain in Paraguay and as a result, they established a community in its capital, Asunción. This was unlike other immigration patterns within South America, such as in Argentina and Brazil, where a majority of Jewish migrants worked in rural areas and in agricultural colonies, rather than in cities.

== World War immigration ==
=== World War I and Interwar Period ===
Paraguay continued with its liberal immigration policies during and after World War I. It is estimated between 15,000 and 20,000 Jewish people from Poland, Ukraine, Germany and Czechoslovakia temporarily sought refuge in Paraguay during World War I and throughout the early 1920s.

The Jewish people who did immigrate to countries within South America, and in particular Paraguay, were of a lower socio-economic status. Sephardi Jews chose to migrate to Latin America in higher numbers than Ashkenazi Jews, whose community preferred to immigrate to the United States and Canada. The Jews who migrated to Paraguay and other South American countries during the early 20th century were mainly Sephardic Jews from Europe and Palestine (Jerusalem) as well as Turkey. They chose to immigrate for reasons of discrimination within their own homelands, but also to escape military conscription. Another contributing factor that encouraged migration to Paraguay were the lower barriers to entry compared to, for instance, North America and neighbouring South American countries. For instance, Paraguay did not require immigrants to have visas, and granted them free work permits.

The rapid influx of Jewish refugees into Paraguay during the early 20th century was also related to quotas on immigration during the Great Depression, which were enforced by Dominion governments and forced Jewish immigrants to seek refuge elsewhere. For instance, Canada admitted only 25,000 Jewish immigrants between 1921 and 1931, compared to 120,000 between 1891 and 1921. This caused many Jewish refugees to seek temporary and permanent refuge in South American countries, such as Paraguay.

During the interwar period, permanent Jewish immigration to Paraguay was lower compared to other South American countries, such as Argentina, which had 210,000 Jewish residents by 1931. This is largely because Paraguay lacked infrastructure and political stability, and thus was not the first preference for many Jewish immigrants seeking permanent refuge.

=== World War II ===
In 1933, the Nazi regime came to power in Germany. The regime held strong anti-Semitic, driven by an ideology that regarded Jewish people as 'enemies against the state'. There were exclusionary policies along with pogroms, such as Kristallnacht – a Nazi-organised riot in 1938, which had the aim of expelling Jews. The Nazis also used extermination camps, such as Auschwitz, between 1941 and 1942, to intern and torture Jews. This prompted mass migration of Jews out of Europe, which meant that by 1942 there were 3,000 Jewish immigrants who had permanently settled in Paraguay, an increase from 1,200 in 1930.

Many Jewish people sought both permanent and temporary refuge in Paraguay as countries such as Argentina and Brazil had tightened immigration restrictions. For instance, Argentina accepted 2,221 Jewish immigrants between 1939 and 1941. However, it is estimated that approximately 8,270 Jews entered the country illegally. Many of these individuals had obtained Paraguayan visas and had then illegally crossed the border into Argentina. However, not all Jewish immigrants who sought asylum in Paraguay were granted citizenship or a visa. For example, Polish Jews fleeing to Brazil in 1940 a boat called the 'Cabo de Hornos' were refused entry due to tightened immigration restrictions. They then sought refuge in Paraguay but were denied entry due to administrative errors. This group of would-be Jewish immigrants returned to Europe.

A further deterrent for Jewish immigrants at this time was the influence of the Paraguayan Fernheim Colony, composed of 2,000 German Mennonites. The Fernheim Mennonites supported the Nazi regime, anti-Semitism and saw the Jewish Paraguayan community as a threat to their faith. Josef Mengele, the Nazi physician, is thought to have originally sought refuge with this Mennonite community after he fled to Paraguay following World War II. Another Paraguayan Mennonite settlement, Menno Colony, founded in Paraguay in 1927, numbered 1,800 members and was less aligned with the Nazi regime's ideologies.

During the World War II period, intellectuals and political personalities within the Paraguayan Jewish community published commentaries and created local newspapers supporting Zionism and raised awareness of the discrimination against Jewish people in Europe. Furthermore, during 1942, Paraguay's government implemented greater constraints against German citizens and sympathisers within Paraguay. This was due to a report released that year by the Federal Bureau of Investigation (FBI), that identified Paraguay and other Latin American nations as a hotspot for Nazi activities. As such, Paraguay monitored German citizens living within their nation. They also prohibited the wearing of German uniforms or any forms of Nazi symbols. These actions were taken to adhere to the demands of the United States government, ultimately, in order to secure a loan. However, these actions taken by the government also benefitted the Paraguayan Jewish community. As a result of this activism and support of a Jewish state, the first diplomatic representative of Israel arrived in Paraguay in 1950.

== Twentieth-century political disputes ==
The Paraguayan Jewish community was impacted by the Arab–Israeli tensions during the 20th century. On 4 May 1970, a day after a ceremony was held by the Jewish Paraguayan community in Asunción to honour the victims of Nazis, a shooting occurred at the Israeli embassy in Asunción. A Jewish Paraguayan employee of the embassy was killed, and another injured. The two Palestinian assailants fled, with media and the Israeli ambassador labelling the shooting 'an attack against Israel'.

However, the Jewish Representative Council in Paraguay condemned the attempt to transfer 'struggling Arab and Israel relations' onto the Paraguayan Jewish community. The Paraguayan Jewish Council did not wish to affiliate the 1967 Arab-Israeli conflict with Paraguayan Jews, stating it could affect their independence and ability to act as their own neutral Jewish state.

== Jewish influence in Paraguay ==
=== Political influence ===
In 2018, Paraguay became the second country in the world to move its Israeli embassy to Jerusalem. However, that same year, Paraguayan President Horacio Cartes was succeeded by Mario Benítez, who reinstated the embassy to Tel Aviv, leading to the closure of the Paraguayan embassy in Jerusalem.

=== Cultural and demographic influence ===
In 1917, the first synagogue was established in Asunción. There are currently three synagogues in Paraguay, all located in the capital, Asunción: one Ashkenazi, one Sephardi, and one Chabad.

In 2013, a small Jewish museum opened in Asunción.

Statistics as of 2019 indicate that of the 6.9 million Paraguayans, there are approximately 1,000 Jewish citizens, known as the 'core Jewish population' – with both parents of Jewish heritage. There are also approximately 300 Paraguayans with one parent who is Jewish. A majority of the Jewish citizens in Paraguay are Ashkenazi and live in the capital of Asunción. The number of Jewish Paraguayans has decreased since 1967, when there were 1,200 core Jewish Paraguayans. This decline in the core Jewish population is largely a result of emigration by members of the Jewish Paraguayan community. From 1948 to 2016, a total of 34 people have made Aliyah to Israel. Additionally, a further nine individuals migrated back to Israel in 2017, followed by eight more in 2018.

Paraguayan Jews have had a significant influence on the domestic and international film industry. The 2019 film Passports to Paraguay depicted the migration of Jews out of Europe during the 1940s who were seeking refuge in South American countries such as Paraguay. Literature has also been written to depict the journey of European Jews to Paraguay. 'Barrio Palestina' by Susana Gertopan, 2005, narrates the story of a Polish Jewish family who emigrated to Paraguay during World War II. The novel highlights how many Jewish people first attempted to seek refuge in Argentina, particularly Buenos Aires, but eventually found themselves in Paraguay due to Argentina's strict immigration restrictions.

The Paraguayan Jewish community has also influenced education within Paraguay. After migration to Paraguay, specifically during World War II, Jewish immigrants faced socio-economic difficulties. However, greater educational opportunities during the late 1950s allowed for upward mobility. This transformed the Paraguayan Jewish community into a middle and upper-middle class demographic. An example of increased educational opportunities after World War II was the Jewish Paraguayan School, Escuela Integral Estado de Israel, which opened in 1959. Since then, it has provided an education based on Jewish values and teachings and was restructured in 2009 to accept enrolments from all Paraguayan students. It is estimated that approximately 70 per cent of the Jewish children within Paraguay attend this school.

== See also ==
- Immigration to Paraguay
- Religion in Paraguay
- History of the Jews in Latin America and the Caribbean
