= History of the Jews in Bolivia =

Bolivian Jews Judíos de Bolivia יהדות בוליביה
Total population
- 500

Regions with significant populations
- La Paz · Cochabamba · Santa Cruz de la Sierra

Languages
- Spanish · Hebrew · Yiddish • Judaeo-Spanish

Religion
- Judaism · Jewish secularism

The location of Bolivia in South America

The history of the Jews in Bolivia goes back to the colonial period of Bolivia in the 16th century. In the 19th century, Jewish merchants (both Sephardim and Ashkenazim) came to Bolivia, most of them taking local women as wives and founding families that merged into the mainstream Catholic society. This was often the case in the eastern regions of Santa Cruz, Tarija, Beni and Pando, where these merchants came either from Brazil or Argentina.

In the colonial period, marranos from Spain settled in the country. Some worked in the silver mines in Potosi and others were among the pioneers that helped found Santa Cruz de la Sierra in 1557. A few customs still held in the region suggest possible marrano Jewish ancestry, but the only documents which exist are from the Peruvian Inquisition.

During the 20th century, substantial Jewish settlement began in Bolivia. In 1905, a group of Russian Jews, followed by Argentines and later a few Sephardi families from Turkey and the Near East, settled in Bolivia. In 1917, it was estimated that there were only 20 to 25 professing Jews living in the country. By 1933, when the Nazi era in Germany started, there were 30 Jewish families. The first large influx of Jewish immigrants was in the 1930s and there were 7,000 of them estimated at the end of 1942. During the 1940s, 2,200 Jews emigrated from Bolivia. But the ones who remained have settled their communities primarily in La Paz, but also Cochabamba, Oruro, Santa Cruz, Sucre, Tarija and Potosí. After World War II, a small number of Polish Jews came to Bolivia. By 1939, Jewish communities gained greater stability in the country.

In recent decades, the Jewish community of Bolivia has declined significantly, many of them migrating to other countries such as Israel, the United States and Argentina. The Jewish community in Bolivia has approximately 500 members with an enlarged population of 700, most of them located in Santa Cruz de la Sierra, followed by La Paz and Cochabamba, all three of which have synagogues.

== 20th century ==
In 1938, German, Polish and Lithuanian Jewish immigrants who settled in La Paz established the La Paz Jewish Cemetery (Spanish: Cementerio Judío de La Paz).

=== Agricultural colonies ===
During the 1938-1940 immigration wave, Jewish refugees received help from the German Jewish businessman Maurice Hochschild who had investments in Bolivia. He helped get visas for Jewish immigrants from Europe and helped found the Sociedad de Proteccion a los Immigrantes Israelitas. Working with the Sociedad Colonizadora de Bolivia, Maurice Hochschild helped develop rural agricultural projects for Jewish refugees. The refugees, however, faced many difficulties and the farms were never able to become self-sufficient.

== 21st century ==
As of 2015, it is estimated that the Jewish community in Bolivia decreased gradually and lacks youth, as they end high school, go to universities abroad, especially in Argentina, Brazil, the United States and Israel, and do not return. The Boliviano Israelita School, located in La Paz, has 294 students, of whom only one is Jewish.

In the 1990s, the community had about 700 members, the Jewish population of Bolivia has remained steady since then. This figure fell to 500 in the 2000s. They have gained a few immigrants, mostly from Argentina, who roughly offset the youth exodus of students leaving for college.

However, the Jewish community still maintains Jewish day schools as of 2023.

== Antisemitism and political attitude towards Israel ==
During the 1930s administration of Germán Busch Becerra the Jewish community enjoyed relative stability. However, the presidents who succeeded Busch were less accepting of Jewish immigrants and anti-Jewish incidents occurred on several occasions, mainly in the cities of La Paz and Cochabamba, where there were attacks on Jewish businesses and community centers.

More recently, in January 2009, the Morales government broke ties with Israel, declaring it a "terrorist and genocidal state." Also, the Bolivian government cancelled an agreement established in 1972 which allowed Israeli citizens to visit the Andean country without a visa.

On 12 August 2014, the President of the Chamber of Deputies Marcelo Elío Chávez of the Movement for Socialism criticized Israeli government policies and stated that:

"Unfortunately, the Jewish people, who were massacred during World War II, did not learn the lesson and now joins with US imperialism."

In November 2019, after the overthrow of Morales, Bolivia resumed ties with Israel and ties are now cordial. However, relations are hostile after Bolivia cut ties with Israel after the Jabalia refugee camp airstrike on October 31, 2023.

== See also ==
- History of the Jews in Latin America
- Immigration to Bolivia
- Religion in Bolivia
