= History of the Jews in the United Kingdom =

The location of United Kingdom (dark green) in Europe

For the history of the Jews in the United Kingdom, including the time before the formation of the Kingdom of Great Britain in 1707, see:

- History of the Jews in England
- History of the Jews in Scotland
- History of the Jews in Northern Ireland
- History of the Jews in Wales

== See also ==
Many of the following articles relate to Jewish history in the British Empire:

- Baghdadi Jews
- British Jews
- British Mandate of Palestine
- History of the Jews in Australia
- History of the Jews in Canada
- History of the Jews in Colonial America
- History of the Jews in Gibraltar
- History of the Jews in Ireland
- History of the Jews in New Zealand
- History of the Jews in South Africa
