= Mario Benítez =

Mario Benítez may refer to:

- Mario Benítez (footballer) (born 1983), Colombian footballer
- Mario Benítez (boxer) (1946–2023), Uruguayan boxer
- Mario Abdo Benítez (born 1971), President of Paraguay
