= History of the Jews in Kyrgyzstan =

The history of the Jews in Kyrgyzstan is linked directly to the history of the Bukharan Jews of Uzbekistan. Until the 20th century, most Jews living in the Kyrgyz areas were members of the Bukharian Jewish community. However, during the 20th century, large numbers of European Jews began to emigrate to Kyrgyzstan, which was then part of the Soviet Union, and a small number of them still live in the country.

In Kyrgyz tradition, the term "Djeet," similar to e.g., Polish żyd, was used to describe Jews. It is mentioned in the Kyrgyz epic poem Manas, which dates back to the 10th century CE. In Manas, several central-Asian cities are described as having Jewish communities in them, among them Samarkand, Bukhara, and Baghdad, though none of them have ever been inhabited by a majority of Kyrgyz people nor included in a Kyrgyz territory.

According to a census held in 1896, the Jews represented about 2% of the region's total population. During World War II, many Jews fled from the European parts of the Soviet Union to central Asia, including Kyrgyzstan, making the Jewish community of Kyrgyzstan a combined Ashkenazi community and Bukharian Sephardic one. The two communities functioned separately, and though it did occasionally happen, Ashkenazi–Sephardi intermarriages were rare.

== Bukharan Jews ==
Bukharan Jews, also known as "Bukharian Jews" or "Bukhari Jews," are Jews from Central Asia who speak Bukhori, a dialect of the Tajik language. Their name comes from the former Central Asian Emirate of Bukhara, which once had a sizable Jewish community. Since the dissolution of the Soviet Union, the great majority have emigrated to Israel and the United States, while others have emigrated to Europe or Australia.

== Medieval period ==
In his memoirs, Marco Polo mentions the existence of Jewish traders along the Silk Road, who passed through modern-day Kyrgyzstan, and built synagogues, and spoke Aramaic. Famous Arab geographer Al-Maqdisi (946−1000) mentioned the cities of Osh, Uzgen, Taraz and others as having communities of Jews.

== Modern period ==
Ashkenazi Jews first arrived in Kyrgyzstan with the conquest by the Russians. In the city of Karakol, one Jew was recorded in 1885. By 1900, there were seven Jews in the city and by 1910, the city had 31 Jewish inhabitants. While in 1885, Bishkek had eight Jews, by 1913, there were 43 Jews in Bishkek. The city of Osh had the largest number of Jews in Kyrgyzstan before the 20th century, due to its Sephardic Jewish community, which even had its Jewish cemetery outside the city.

During the beginning of the 20th century, numerous Jewish Businessmen owned businesses in the Kyrgyz area − among them Yuri Davidov, who owned cotton factories in the Fergana valley, Boris Kagan, who established a network of bookshops, and the Polyakov brothers, who founded a branch of the Azov-Don Commercial Bank. Due to the need for doctors, teachers and engineers, many Ashkenazi Jews began to emigrate to Kyrgyzstan from European Russia.

== Religious life ==
It is known that the Jewish community of Osh bought its Torah scrolls from its neighboring community of Uzbek Bukhara.

Until 1915, there were no synagogues in Kyrgyzstan. The nearest one was in Verniy, nowadays Almaty in Kazakhstan, Tashkent, Samarkand and Fergana in Uzbekistan. A separate Jewish cemetery operated only in Osh, while in all other cities Jews were buried in separate areas of the general Muslim/Christian cemeteries.

While there was no Jewish education in Kyrgyzstan, some Sephardic Jews in Osh sent their children to learn at the Heder in Samarkand. Ashkenazi Jews did not practice Judaism publicly and sent their children to Russian schools.

== After World War I ==
After World War I, more and more Ashkenazi Jews came to Kyrgyzstan. Many representatives of different political parties were exiled to central Asia, or government officials were asked to work in rural areas such as Kyrgyzstan. With the outbreak of the October Revolution, many political activists were sent to Kyrgyzstan to promote the communist ideas, and bolshevic rule − many of whom were Jews or of Jewish origin (from the far western part of the former Russian Empire), such as G. Broido, who was chairman of the Bishkek city soviet, and Pinchasov, Lifschitz and Frei, who were members of the local city soviets of Osh, Dzhalal-Abad, and Tokmak. In 1920, the local ministry of education initiated a Jewish institute run by Simon Dimanshtein meant for the alphabetization of Sephardic Jews. In 1929, Alexander Volodarsky, a former Yeshiva student from Vitebsk, became the leader of the Ashkenazi Jewish community of Osh after being exiled from Belarus due to his religious practices.

== World War II and on ==
During the Second World War, more than 20,000 Ashkenazi Jews fled to Kyrgyzstan from the Nazi-occupied western parts of the Soviet Union. The Jewish Theater Company of Warsaw, with the renowned actress Jewish-Polish Ida Kamińska (1899−1980), was evacuated to Bishkek until it was moved back to Europe after the war. During that time, the theater performed in Bishkek in Yiddish and Russian.

By 1945, some 70 Jews of the Bishkek community visited the local synagogue daily. On holidays, some 2,500 Jews visited the synagogue. Later, the synagogue began hosting Sephardic prayers for the city's Sephardi community. During the 1950s, the Jewish community of Bishkek reached about 3% of the city's total population. Jews became dominant in the local university, clinics and schools, living mainly in the Bishkek's center. On other cities, smaller communities of Jews had lived also in the center mostly.

During the 1970s, some Jews began to emigrate to Israel, though the Soviet government made it hard for them to emigrate. Later on, and especially from 1989 and on, the vast majority of the Kyrgyzstan Jewish community emigrated to Israel, leaving around 400 Jews living in the country as of 2018.

In 2000, Rabbi Arie Reichman, member of Alliance of Rabbis in Islamic States was sent by the Chabad movement to serve the Jewish community of Bishkek as Chief Rabbi, and nowadays there is a Jewish day school named "Pri Etz-Chaim", teaching some Hebrew and Jewish texts. The community is characterised by inter-religious marriage, and secular practice.

== Cemeteries ==
Jewish graves can be found at the Bishkek old and new cemeteries, in specific sections. Local cemetery workers usually know about these areas. In Dzhalal-Abad, at the local cemetery, Jewish graves are scattered all around the cemetery, marked usually by the Magen David sign.

== See also ==
- History of the Jews in Central Asia
