= History of the Jews in South Korea =

Flag of South Korea

The history of Jews in South Korea, and in Korea as a whole, goes back to the mid 1900s. The first sizable Jewish presence in Korea was during the Korean War, in which hundreds of UN Jewish soldiers participated. After the war, Chaim Potok served in South Korea as a US Army chaplain from 1955–1957. His experiences in Korea led to the novels The Book of Lights and I Am the Clay.

== 21st century ==
Most of the Jewish community in South Korea resides in Seoul. The community is mostly U.S. military personnel and their families, business people, English-language journalists and teachers, and tourists. The Jewish population is constantly in flux, due to the rotation of U.S. military personnel in the country. While the soldiers have a Jewish chaplain at the Yongsan Army Base, their services are restricted and off-limits to most civilians. At this time, there are no Jewish schools.

Israel has full diplomatic relations with South Korea, and the sizable Christian population in the country also keeps ties strong between the countries. In August 2005, the Jerusalem Summit promoting Christian support for Israel was held in Seoul. In contrast, neighboring North Korea has no known Jews within its borders.

In April 2008, the first Chabad House was established in Seoul under direction of Rabbi Osher Litzman, accompanied by his wife, Mussia Litzman. As there were no synagogues in the country, Jews in Korea would have to go to the U.S. Army base for Shabbat meals and holiday services. Chabad.org news service reported that the Israeli ambassador to South Korea asked three visiting Lubavitch yeshiva students to help arrange for permanent Chabad emissaries. Though very few South Koreans are interested in Judaism as a religion, philosemitism is prevalent among the South Korean population as they reportedly hope to emulate Jews' high academic standards by studying books derived from Jewish works such as the Torah and Talmud. With South Korean society's passion for education, South Koreans hold a stereotypical view of Jews as the model of academic excellence as well as Jews being very intelligent. However, journalist Dave Hazzan investigated this and found no antisemitism in South Korea. Moreover, Abe Foxman, head of the ADL, admitted that cultural norms affected the respondents' answers which has to be considered for future surveys.

In addition, South Koreans also laud Jews as a high achieving and accomplished group of people citing the disproportionate number of successful Jewish businesspeople and Nobel Prize winners as evidence and use this as inspiration for the South Korean populace to emulate Jewish success. The South Korean media often discusses the merits of "Jewish education" to the South Korean populace. South Koreans also identify with Judaism's arduous history of being oppressed peoples, surviving adversity with nothing but intellect and ingenuity to socioeconomically succeed, as well as its strong emphasis on family.

In 2014, the Anti-Defamation League reported that the average South Korean was more than twice as likely to be antisemitic than the global average.

In 2019, the first mikveh in South Korea was opened.

== See also ==
- Religion in South Korea
- South Korea-Israel relations
