= History of the Jews in Colombia =

Colombian Jews Judíos colombianos יהדות קולומביה
Total population
- 14,700

Regions with significant populations
- Bogotá, Barranquilla, Medellín, Cali,

Languages
- Spanish, Hebrew, Yiddish, Ladino

Religion
- Judaism and Christianity

The history of the Jews in Colombia begins in the Spanish colonial period with the arrival of the first Jews during the Spanish colonization of the Americas.

== History ==
"New Christians", or Marranos, fled the Iberian peninsula to escape persecution and seek religious freedom during the 16th and 17th centuries. It is estimated that some reached northern areas of Colombia, which at the time was known as New Granada. Most if not all of these people assimilated into Colombian society. Some continue to practice Jewish rituals as family traditions.

In the 18th century, practicing Spanish and Portuguese Jews came from Jamaica and Curaçao, where they had flourished under English and Dutch rule. These Jews started practicing their religion openly in Colombia at the end of the 18th century, although it was not officially legal to do so, given the established Catholic Church. After independence, Judaism was recognized as a legal religion. The government granted the Jews land for a cemetery.

Many Jews who came during the 18th and 19th centuries achieved prominent positions in Colombian society. Some married local women and felt they had to abandon or diminish their Jewish identity. These included author Jorge Isaacs of English Jewish ancestry, the industrialist James Martin Eder (who adopted the more Christian name of Santiago Eder when he translated his name to Spanish) born into the Latvian Jewish community, as well as the De Lima, Salazar, Espinoza, Arias, Ramirez, Nunez, Lindo, Tafur, Lozano, Lerma, Vinasco, De Castro, Perez and Lobo families of Antillean Sephardim. Coincidentally, these persons and their families settled in the Cauca Valley region of Colombia. They have continued to be influential members of society in cities such as Cali, Palmira and Tulua. Over the generations most of their descendants were raised as secular Christians.

During the early part of the 20th century, numerous Sephardic Jewish immigrants came from Greece, Turkey, North Africa and Syria. Shortly after, Jewish immigrants began to arrive from Eastern Europe. A wave of Ashkenazi immigrants came after the rise of Nazism in 1933 and the imposition of anti-Semitic laws and practices, followed by as many as 17,000 German Jews. From 1939 until the end of World War II, immigration was put to a halt by anti-immigrant feelings in the country and restrictions on immigration from Germany.

Colombia asked Germans who were on the U.S. blacklist to leave and allowed Jewish refugees in the country illegally to stay. The Jewish population increased dramatically in the 1950s and 1960s, and institutions such as synagogues, schools and social clubs were established throughout the largest cities in the country. Rabbi Eliezer Roitblatt was the first rabbi to arrive in Colombia in 1946, and served as its first Ashkenazi Chief Rabbi. In the 1950s, a Sephardic Jewish community originating in particular from Syria, Turkey and Egypt was created with Rabbi David Sharbani serving as the Sephardic Chief Rabbi.

A wave of kidnappings during the last decade of the 20th century led some members of Colombia's Jewish community to emigrate. Most settled in Miami and other parts of the United States.

== Jewish ancestry in the Andean Regions ==
In the department of Antioquia, as well as in the greater Paisa region, some families hold traditions and oral accounts of Jewish descent. In this population, Y-DNA genetic analysis has shown an origin of male founders predominantly from "southern Spain but also suggest that a fraction came from northern Iberia and that some possibly had a Sephardic origin". Medellín has a tradition of the marranada, where a pig is slaughtered, butchered and consumed on the streets of every neighborhood each Christmas. This custom has been interpreted as an annual affirmation of the rejection of Jewish law.

It was known that some Spanish and Portuguese New Christians of Sephardic Jewish ancestry fled the Cartagena de Indias Inquisition and took refuge in the Antioquian mountains during the sixteenth and seventeenth century. Some Colombian authors like Jorge Isaacs and Miguel Ángel Osorio have claimed that it is indisputable that Paisas have Jewish ancestry. Several Paisa surnames are known to have been prevalent among New Christian conversos of Sephardic Jewish origin, for example Espinosa, Pérez, Mejía, and many others.

Some scholars state that the presence of Sephardic Jews among the ancestors of Paisas is a fact, but it does not mean that all Paisas descend from them, nor that it is the only or predominant element among those that do, as is proven by the Paisas' descent from other groups like Basques, Extremadurans, and Andalusians.

The history of the conversos in the New Granada, now known as Colombia, is a rich and complex narrative that spans across various regions of the country. These individuals, originally seeking refuge from the Spanish Inquisition, established themselves not only in the Paisa region but throughout the entire territory of the New Granada.

They settled in various regions, including the Paisa area (Antioquia) known for its mountainous terrain and relative isolation. This isolation provided a haven for many conversos who were fleeing persecution. However, the Sephardic diaspora extended well beyond the Paisa region. Significant populations of conversos were found in the central parts of the kingdom, particularly in the regions of Boyacá, Santander, and Cundinamarca. Despite their conversion to Christianity, conversos in the New Granada were not free from the reach of the Inquisition. The Inquisition pursued suspected heretics and crypto-Jews throughout the country. Many conversos were tried and persecuted, facing charges of relapsing into Judaism. The center of the kingdom, including Boyacá, Santander, and Cundinamarca, was particularly noted for the presence of these individuals, and many records of the Inquisition trials come from these areas.

The influence of Sephardic Jews in Colombia is significant. It has been established that a considerable proportion of the Colombian population has Sephardic ancestry. In particular, studies have shown that a notable percentage of Antioqueños are descended from Sephardic Jews. However, this heritage is not confined to Antioquia alone. It is estimated that around 10% of the Colombian population carries Jewish DNA, specially in the Andes regions, indicating a widespread Sephardic influence throughout the country.

== Modern community ==
As of the 21st century, approximately 14,700 Jews live in Colombia. Most of them are concentrated in Bogotá, with about 6,000 members, and Cali, with about 3,500 members. New communities have sprung up in Barranquilla and Medellín. Very few Jews practice religious observance; among those who do, the majority are Orthodox. German Jewish communities in Bogota and Cali also preserve much of their traditions.

Smaller communities are found in Cartagena and the island of San Andres. There are approximately 18 official synagogues throughout the country. In Bogotá, the Ashkenazi, Sephardic, and German Jews each run their own religious and cultural institutions. The Confederación de Asociaciones Judías de Colombia, located in Bogotá, is the central organization that coordinates Jews and Jewish institutions in Colombia.

In the new millennium, after years of study, a group of Colombians with Jewish ancestry formally converted to Judaism in order to be accepted as Jews according to the rabbinical interpretation of the halakha.

== See also ==
- History of the Jews in Latin America and the Caribbean
