= History of the Jews in Ecuador =

Ecuadorian Jews Judíos de Ecuador יהדות אקוודור
Total population
- 290

Regions with significant populations
- Quito and Guayaquil

Languages
- Spanish, Yiddish, Ladino and Hebrew

Religion
- Judaism

The location of Ecuador in South America

The history of the Jews in Ecuador dates back to the 16th and 17th centuries, when Sephardic Jews began arriving from Spain and Portugal as a result of the Spanish Inquisition. Ecuadorian Jews are members of a small Jewish community in the territory of today's Ecuador, and they form one of the smallest Jewish communities in South America.

== History ==
=== Early years ===
The first Jews began to arrive in Ecuador in the 16th and 17th centuries. From 1580 to 1640, when Spain and Portugal were united in the Iberian Union, King Philip II of Spain was the only heir to the throne. During this time, many Portuguese were "suspicious of their faith", so the Jews began to enter the Viceroyalty of Peru, a newly founded colony where Inquisition surveillance was weaker. As a result of the Iberian Union, much of Spanish America was ruled by one crown during this period of sixty years. During this time, the Portuguese spread Christianity as they arrived in the dominions of Spanish America, and the term "Portuguese" was synonymous with "converted Jew". In 1640, the union ended when the Portuguese revolted against the Spanish monarchy and the Duke of Braganza took the throne of the kingdom of Portugal under the name of John IV.

The "new Christians" in Spanish America found no support from the inquisitorial regime, and were forced to migrate to other regions of the Peruvian viceroyalty, especially to those where the Inquisition did not have any courts. The Viceroyalty of Peru was extremely large, and the territory still contained large areas with little to no Inquisition presence. By avoiding major urban centers, Jewish people, labeled as heretics, could survive by camouflaging their personal and group identity. Thus began a pattern of "new Christians" settling in the Viceroyalty of Peru, where they migrated from its center to the less-populated and less-controlled outer regions.

A relatively large number of migrants made their way towards the southern and northern Chile Audience of Quito. Within Quito, the new diaspora first headed to the Interior Juan Salinas and Loyola (later transformed into the township of Loja), which, according to studies by Ricardo Ordoñez Chiriboga, was an important destination for many migrating Sephardim. Subsequently, many of these families migrated further north to Cuenca, and then to the northernmost township of Chimborazo (Alausí, Pallatanga and Chimborazo), continuing the flight from the powerful and cruel inquisitorial arm. Early Sephardic Jews likely arrived in Cuenca and its nearby settlements in the late sixteenth and early seventeenth centuries, but there is evidence of additional waves of Jewish migration to the area in later times. It is possible that other Sephardim had been established in the colonial territory since the early days of the Spanish conquest, suggested by the presence of names associated with conquerors who arrived alongside Sebastián de Benalcázar and Pedro de Alvarado. In the seventeenth century, landowners began to appear in Cuenca with surnames of uncertain origin, including Saavedra, Hadaad and Iglesias. Migrants also reached the northern Peruvian Andes, as cultural and ethnic influences of the region were not yet defined by colonial boundaries to the extent they are today. Rather, this cultural-historical unit traces back to pre-Columbian times.

These circumstances largely explain the Sephardic presence in gold and commercial areas of Quito and Calacalí such as Loja, Zaruma, Cuenca, Santa Isabel, Yungilla, Tarquí, Chordeleg and Sígsig, as well as in other mountain passes or trade route towns between Guayaquil and Quito, such as Alausí Chapacoto, Chimborazo St. Joseph, San Miguel de Chimborazo, Guaranda, as well as other areas in the northern highlands of Peru due to their proximity. The presence of Western Sephardic Jews in Ecuador remained hidden for years, as they often settled in very remote villages and practiced Judaism in secret at home. Many of these Crypto-Jews still speak Ladino. Some say that Antonio José de Sucre, a leader in the struggle for independence in South America, and the hero of Ecuador, who served both as president of Peru and as president of Bolivia, is a descendant of these Jews. Certain family names among established Ecuadorian families attest to their (in some cases Crypto-Jewish) Sephardi ancestry; however, prior to World War II there was very little active Jewish immigration to Ecuador.

Sephardic names in Ecuador include: Navon (wise), Moreno (teacher), Gabay (official), Piedra (stone), Franco (free), Amzalag (jeweler), Saban (soap), Espinoza (thorn), Nagar (carpenter), Haddad (blacksmith), and Hakim (medic).

=== 20th Century ===
In 1904, there were only four recognized Jewish families in Ecuador, and a 1917 survey indicated the presence of 14 Jews in the country. After the United States established its immigration quota system with the Immigration Act of 1924, a handful more Jews arrived in Ecuador. However, mass Jewish immigration to Ecuador only began in the wake of the rise of Nazism and the ensuing Holocaust in Europe. During the years 1933–1943, about 2,700 Jews arrived, and by 1945 there were 3,000 new Jewish immigrants, 85% of whom were refugees from Europe.

In the early years of World War II, Ecuador still admitted a certain number of immigrants; in 1939, when several South American countries refused to accept the 165 Jewish refugees from Germany aboard the ship Koenigstein, Ecuador granted them entry permits. Nevertheless, the country eventually gave way to a policy of selectivity. According to policy, Jewish immigrants to Ecuador were supposed to be employed in agriculture, but the authorities soon surmised that the immigrants were actually merchants, industrialists, and businessmen. As a result, legislation was passed in 1938 which compelled any Jew not engaged in agriculture or industry to leave the country. In addition, entry rights were limited to only Jews who possessed a minimum of $400, which they would then be required to invest in an industrial project.

In 1935, the Comite pour l'Etude de l'Industrie de l'Immigration dans la Republique de l'Equateur (English: Committee for the Study of the Immigration Industry in the Republic of Ecuador) was established in Paris by the Freeland League for Jewish Colonization, with the purpose of creating a Jewish homeland in Ecuador, Australia or Surinam. An agreement was reached with the Ecuadorian government to transfer 500,000 acres of land to the committee's jurisdiction for a period of 30 years to be settled by immigrants regardless of race, religion, or nationality. Several concessions were also promised, such as tax exemption for three years, citizenship after one year, customs exemption, and free transportation by train from the port to the interior of the country. The president signed the agreement several months later on the condition that a detailed program be presented by May 1937, and that the Committee invest $8,000 and settle at least 100 families. Some Jewish organizations, however, found the land proposed for the plan unacceptable, claiming that it was too far from population centers and that the climate was too severe. These objections resulted in a total abandonment of the project.

Following this attempt, the American Jewish Joint Distribution Committee and HICEM (a merger of the Hebrew Immigrant Aid Society, the Jewish Colonization Association, and EmigDirect which handled transportation through European ports; the latter German-based organization withdrew in 1934) attempted to establish chicken farms for the immigrants in other areas of Ecuador, and 60 families were settled, but conditions precluded any success in the venture, which ultimately failed. Most of the immigrants were businessmen and professionals who preferred to carry on their professions. Many Jewish craftsmen discovered that the native balsa wood was excellent for furniture craft and began production. Later, these immigrants introduced iron and steel furniture to the Ecuadorian market, previously unknown to the country. They also developed retail stores and opened hotels. The success of many of these immigrants, however, caused tension among the Syrian and Cuban communities, who had previously controlled those industries. This pressure led to an anti-Jewish sentiment, but nothing more substantial.

In 1940, there were 3,000 Jews recorded in Ecuador, of whom a large majority were refugees from Germany. The majority of Jews in Ecuador worked in the press, commerce, and medical industries. They also established textile, pharmaceutical, and furniture factories.

At its peak, in 1950, the Jewish population of Ecuador was estimated at 4,000, with the majority living in Quito. Several hundred also lived in Guayaquil, with several scores in Ambato, Riobamba, and Cuenca. In 1952, a law was passed requiring every foreigner to supply proof that they were engaged in the occupation stipulated in their entry visa. In response, the World Jewish Congress (JWC) tried to help Jews who were practicing business, but were only allowed to engage in agricultural work according to their visas. However, attempts at agricultural settlement were unsuccessful.

Ecuador's government policies regarding Jewish emigration are historically tentative and volatile; for example, in 1935 it gave the Jews permission to settle within an area of about 20,000 square kilometres (7,700 sq mi), but in 1938 it issued an order that all Jewish residents working in areas other than agriculture or incapable of developing the industry would be required to leave the country.

=== Jewish community today ===
In total, only 290 Jews live in Ecuador today. The country's Jewish community is predominantly of German origin, but the younger generation is largely Spanish-speaking. The Ecuadorian Jewish community is a homogeneous group, which has facilitated great communal organization. For example, the Asociación de Beneficencia Israelita, founded in 1938, is the central body for Jewish religious and cultural affairs in Ecuador. Other Jewish organizations in the country include the Zionist Federation, B'nai B'rith, the Women's International Zionist Organization (WIZO), and Maccabi. The community also publishes a bilingual Spanish–German bulletin called Informaciones. In Ecuador, intermarriage is not as large a problem as elsewhere, since Jews form a separate middle stratum between the upper (traditionally Catholic) classes and the lower classes of the indigenous population.

There is a Jewish school in Quito, the Colegio Experimental Alberto Einstein, established in 1973, which serves both Jewish and non-Jewish students from kindergarten through the twelfth grade. The school celebrates all Jewish holidays, and it teaches Hebrew and other Jewish studies. The school has an excellent reputation and offers a pre-college preparatory program. The Jewish community of Quito also has its own building, a home for the elderly, and a synagogue that holds services on the Sabbath and holidays.

Ecuador has traditionally maintained friendly relations with Israel, and has frequently supported Israel in the United Nations; the Ecuadorian Embassy is in Tel Aviv. In the late 1960s, the two countries developed a network of technical cooperation and assistance, particularly in the fields of agriculture and water development. Since 1948, 137 Ecuadorian Jews have emigrated to Israel.

== Prominent Ecuadorian Jews ==
Ecuadorian Jews have achieved prominence in various fields including academics, industry, and science. Benno Weiser (a.k.a. Benjamin Varon), who was an active Ecuadorian journalist, later entered the Israeli diplomatic service, serving in various Latin American countries. His brother, Max Weiser, was the first Israeli consul in Ecuador. Moselio Schaechter was a researcher involved studying bacterial growth and cell division.
