= History of the Jews in Nigeria =

Jewish and Judaic-like presence in Nigeria

The location of Nigeria in Africa

The historical presence and verification of Jews and Judaism in Nigeria is a cause for debate, with regard to the handful of Judaic-oriented religious groups among the largest ethnic groups in the populous country. Such groups claim that their religious practices resulted either from centuries of continuous practice of Jewish or Judaic-like customs, absorbed from contact with the Jews of Bilad el-Sudan, or by the groups' more recent departure from European Christianity to modern Judaism. In either case, Jewish organizations in Israel and the United States have sought to understand and assist the world's emerging Jewish communities, including a small minority that considers themselves Jewish within the ethnic Igbo people, while the vast majority of Igbo are Christians.

Rabbi Yisrael Uzan, a leader in the Alliance of Rabbis in Islamic States, serves as the Chief Rabbi of Nigeria and the Chabad representative in Abuja. Rabbi Mendel Sternbach serves as Rabbi of Lagos. They are involved in Humanitarian Aid, especially prior to Ramadan.

== Igbo Jews ==
The Igbo Jews of Nigeria are one of the components of the Igbo people.

Certain Nigerian communities with Judaic practices have been receiving help from individual Israelis and American Jews who work in Nigeria, out-reach organizations like Kulanu, and African-American Jewish communities in America. Jews from outside Nigeria founded two synagogues in Nigeria, which are attended and maintained by the Igbo.

Because no formal census has been taken in the region, the number of Igbos in Nigeria who identify as Israelites or Jews is not known. There are currently 26 synagogues of various sizes. An estimated 4,000 Igbos were practicing some form of Judaism in 2016. Some synagogues in Nigeria include: CHW known as Community of Hashem Worldwide with several synagogues around Nigeria and some part of Cameroon.

== Akwa Ibom and Cross River Jews ==
Practitioners of Judaism among the Annang, Efik, and Ibibio people of Akwa Ibom and Cross River States have active synagogues, with the majority of the synagogues in the eastern part of the country, a vibrant one in Abuja, supported and provided with many Jewish materials by different Rabbis. There are also key synagogues in Port Harcourt and Lagos.

== See also ==
- History of the Jews in Africa

=== Regions: ===
- History of the Jews in Central Africa
- History of the Jews in East Africa
- History of the Jews in North Africa
- History of the Jews in Southern Africa
- History of the Jews in West Africa
