= History of the Jews in Panama =

The location of Panama in the Americas

The history of Jews in Panama began in the 16th century, with the arrival of the first conversos who had been expelled from or were fleeing Spain and Portugal due to the Spanish inquisition. While these individuals professed to be Catholic for their safety, many continued to practice Judaism in secret.

After the Inquisition ended, Sephardic immigration to Panama increased. Despite the presence of Jews in the country, years of secret practice meant that there was no established community, a fact that began to change in the 1800s. There were waves of immigration from Syria following the dissolution of the Ottoman Empire following World War I, and from Europe as Ashkenazi Jews fled the Holocaust.

Today, Panama is home to the largest Jewish population in Central America. There are more than 30,000 Jews living in Panama, most of whom live in Panama City. Much of the population is orthodox, and a vast majority considers itself "traditional," following laws of kashrut and educating their children in Jewish day schools. A majority of Panamanian Jews are of Sephardic ancestry, with Syrian Jews comprising the largest group. Panama is the only country outside of Israel that has had two Jewish heads of state.

== Viceroyalty Period ==
The presence of Anusim or Crypto-Jews has been recorded since the earliest migrations of Spaniards and Portuguese to the territory, though historical records during the Inquisition are sparse due to the persecution during that period. The history of Panamanian Jews in the Viceroyal era has been divided by some scholars into two periods based on the place of emigration.

=== The Castilian Period (1501–1580) ===
This period was marked by the arrival of Crypto-Jews of Castilian origin, who played an active role in the colonization of the territory. When Rodrigo de Bastidas arrived at the Isthmus of Panama in 1501, he was accompanied by recent Christian converts. From the first Spanish expeditions and throughout the entire conquest, Judeo-conversos were present in the region.

The governor and founder of Panama City, Pedro Arias Dávila (known as Pedrarias), had Jewish ancestry on both his paternal and maternal lines. His paternal grandfather, Ysaque Abenazar, was an influential member of the Jewish community in Segovia, who later converted to Catholicism and adopted the name Diego Arias Dávila. Although his religious beliefs remain unclear, it is known that he protected Judeo-conversos from the persecution led by Franciscan bishop Fray Juan de Quevedo.

Many early converso settlers were part of the Pisa family, whose descendants arrived in Panama and later settled in other regions. Although not all Crypto-Jews bore the surname "de Pisa", it is a common ancestral trunk of several converso families in the region.

=== The Portuguese Period (1580–1640) ===
The Portuguese period began in 1580, following the dynastic union of Portugal with the Spanish Crown. During this time, Portuguese Crypto-Jews, who were better organized and had greater resources, managed to establish a prayer house on Calafates Street, located behind the old Cathedral of Panama la Vieja.

=== The Great Conspiracy (1642-1649) ===
However, the Inquisition intensified its persecution of Jews. This peaked in the 1640s, shortly after Portugal declared independence from Spain. A priest claimed to have overheard two conversos plotting to set fire to the inquisitors' living quarters, killing everyone inside. This account, which historians believe was fabricated, became known as the "Great Conspiracy." From 1642-1649, hundreds of people were put on trial for "judaizing," observing Jewish traditions and rituals. This period of intense discrimination dismantled much of the Crypto-Jewish network in the Isthmus. From then on, their presence in historical records became more elusive, as fear of persecution led many to conceal their identity even further.

One of the most documented episodes of this persecution was the arrest of the Portuguese Sebastián Rodríguez, accused of being a Judaizer. Rodríguez led a group of Crypto-Jews, including Antonio de Ávila, González de Silva, Domingo de Almeyda, and a Mercedarian friar, all of whom were secret practitioners of Judaism. During the judicial proceedings, four doctors certified the presence of a circumcision mark on Rodríguez, which was used as evidence against him.

== Union Period with Colombia ==
The organized Jewish community in Panama has existed since the 1820s.

When the Isthmus joined Simón Bolívar’s Federation project, a new wave of Jewish migration took place, revitalizing Mosaic faith in the Isthmus. These early Jewish immigrants arrived under a new policy that initially promoted religious freedom in the newly independent territories. They played a crucial role as intermediaries and translators, acting as liaisons between the local population and foreigners arriving or passing through the region, thanks to their proficiency in multiple languages such as German, Spanish, French, English, Dutch, and Papiamento.

Both Sephardic Jews and Ashkenazi Jews began arriving in significant numbers in Panama during the mid-19th century, attracted by economic opportunities such as the construction of the transoceanic railroad and the California Gold Rush. This migratory influx marked an important chapter in the history of Panama’s Jewish community.

The first synagogue, Kol She'erith Israel, was founded in 1876 in the city of Colon.

== Today ==
During the 1990s, around 7,000 Jews lived in Panama, including around 1,000 Israelis. By 2014, the Jewish population was between 12,000 to 14,000.

The current Jewish population of Panama is around 15,000 and is centered in Panama City. Small but growing, Panama has the largest Jewish population in Central America. Well-integrated into Panama's social and political life, Panama is the only country other than Israel to have had two Jewish presidents during the 20th century: Max Delvalle Maduro in April 1967, and Eric Arturo Delvalle Cohen-Henriquez from 1985 to 1988. Additionally, Mayer Mizrachi, another member of the Jewish community, was elected Mayor of Panama City.

== Kosher food ==
The majority of Panamanian Jews keep kosher or maintain a kosher kitchen at home. Panama City, often considered a kosher paradise, boasts over 50 establishments offering kosher food, including restaurants, markets, bakeries, and catering services. Super Kosher is a 1,500 square meter kosher supermarket in Panama City that sells almost 10,000 kosher products, making it the largest kosher market in the world outside of Israel. Another notable kosher supermarket in panama is Deli K, which primarily sells imported products from Israel.

== Notable Panamanian Jews ==
- Felipe Gutiérrez de Toledo (converso), Governor of Veragua (1534-1534) who led a migration movement from Almagro and Toledo to the Veragua region.
- Diego Gutiérrez (converso), Governor and captain of Veragua (1540-1544), who was killed by the indigenous population.
- Abner Benaim, a film director, producer, screenwriter and plastic artist.
- Morris Fidanque de Castro, Governor of the United States Virgin Islands.
- Eric Arturo Delvalle, President of Panama from 28 September 1985 until 26 February 1988.
- Max Delvalle, vice president from 1964 to 1968 and briefly served as acting president in 1967.
- Eugene Eisenmann, a lawyer and amateur ornithologist.
- Zion Levy, the Sephardic Chief Rabbi of Panama for 57 years, the longest tenure of any religious leader in the region.
