= History of the Jews in Monaco =

The location of Monaco (dark green, in circle) in Europe

The history of the Jews in Monaco goes back at least a century, most notably to the time of the Holocaust. Monaco had a very small Jewish presence before World War II, numbering approximately 300 people. During the war, the principality's government issued false identity papers to its Jewish residents to protect them from Nazi deportation. Prince Louis II refused to dismiss Jewish civil servants and protected Édouard de Rothschild from deportation. However, Monaco's police arrested and turned over 42 Central European Jewish refugees to the Nazis. Sixty Jews were arrested 27–28 August 1942, and ninety in total, according to The Algemeiner.

In 1948, the Association Cultuelle Israelite de Monaco was founded as the official organization of Monaco's Jewish community, and it provides the community with a synagogue, Hebrew school and no kosher food store, but a kosher section in some supermarkets. Today's Jewish community in Monaco consists primarily of retirees from France and the United Kingdom, and there is also a small population of North African and Turkish Jews. More Sephardic Jews came when they were expelled from countries like Morocco, Algeria, Tunisia, Yemen, and South America/ Spain. To them, Monaco and France were alternatives to Israel.

Approximately 1,000 Jewish expatriates of other countries comprise about 2.86% of Monaco's total residents (citizen and non-citizen combined). This means Monaco has the highest per capita total of Jewish residents of any country in the world outside Israel (though not the highest per capita number of Jewish citizens).

Monaco has full diplomatic relations with Israel.

== World War II monument and apology ==
In August 2015, Prince Albert II apologized for the role of Monaco in deporting Jews to Nazi Germany's concentration camps. A monument dedicated to Monaco Jews who were so deported was unveiled by the Prince during that occasion; it stands at the Monaco Cemetery.

== House of Grimaldi ==
The daughter of Caroline, Princess of Hanover, Charlotte Casiraghi, was in a relationship with Moroccan-Jewish stand-up comedian Gad Elmaleh, who had gained notoriety in France, Morocco and the US. They had a son Raphaël, who was born on 17 December 2013 and was baptized. Since they were not married, Raphaël is not included in the line of succession to the Monegasque throne. The couple split in June 2015.

== See also ==
- Invasion and occupation of Monaco during World War II
- History of the Jews in France
