= History of the Jews in Central Asia =

Jews have lived in Central Asia, including the modern countries of Kyrgyzstan, Kazakhstan, Tajikistan, Turkmenistan, and Uzbekistan, for centuries.

== Kazakhstan ==
Joseph Stalin forcibly relocated thousands of Jews from other parts of the Soviet Union to the Kazakh SSR. During the Holocaust 8,000 Jews fled to Kazakhstan.

Kazakhstan's Jewish population rapidly increased between 1926 and 1959, being almost eight times larger in 1959 than in 1926. Kazakhstan's Jewish population slowly declined between 1959 and 1989, followed by a much larger decline after the fall of Communism between 1989 and 2002 due to massive Jewish emigration, mostly to Israel.

== Kyrgyzstan ==
Until the 20th century, most Jews living in the Kyrgyz areas were of the Bukharan Jewish community. However, during the 20th century, large numbers of European Jews began to emigrate to Kyrgyzstan which was then part of the Soviet Union, and a small number still lives in that country.

According to a census held in 1896, Jews represented about 2% of the region's total population. Ashkenazi Jews first arrived in Kyrgyzstan with its conquest by the Russians. After World War I, more and more Ashkenazi Jews came to Kyrgyzstan. During the Second World War, more than 20,000 Ashkenazi Jews fled to Kyrgyzstan from the Nazi-occupied western parts of the Soviet Union. After the Second World War, the percentage of the Jewish population began to decline and in early 2001 the Jews represented only 0.03% of the total population.

== Tajikistan ==
Jews and Judaism in Tajikistan have a long and varied history. Jews first arrived in the eastern part of the Emirate of Bukhara, in what is today Tajikistan, in the 2nd century BC. After the Communists came to power they organized the country into republics, including Tajikistan, which was first formed as an autonomous republic within Uzbekistan in 1924, and in 1929 became a full-fledged republic. In an effort to develop Tajikistan, Soviet authorities encouraged migration, including thousands of Jews, from neighboring Uzbekistan. Most Jews settled in Dushanbe, the capital of Tajikistan, where they opened the Dushanbe Synagogue, now destroyed. During World War II, a second wave of Ashkenazic Jews migrated to Tajikistan.

== Turkmenistan ==
Jews and Judaism in Turkmenistan have a history dating back to the late 1830s when Persian Jews, fleeing persecution in Iran settled in Mary, Ýolöten, and Baýramaly. During the 1980s, the population peaked to about 2500.

== Uzbekistan ==
Uzbek Jews have two distinct communities; the more religious and traditional Bukharan Jewish community and the more progressive, Europe-extracted Ashkenazi community. There were 94,900 Jews in Uzbekistan in 1989. Most Uzbek Jews are now Ashkenazi due to the immigration of Bukharian Jews to Israel and the United States.

The Jewish population of Uzbekistan (then known as the Uzbek SSR) nearly tripled between 1926 and 1970, then slowly declined between 1970 and 1989, followed by a much more rapid decline since 1989, when the collapse of Communism began to occur. Between 1989 and 2002, over ninety percent of Uzbekistan's Jewish population left Uzbekistan and moved to other countries, mostly to Israel.

== See also ==
- Khazars
- Bukharian Jews
- Mountain Jews
- History of the Jews in Russia
- History of the Jews in the Soviet Union
