= Jewish population by city =

This is a list of Jewish populations in different cities and towns around the world. It includes statistics for populations of metropolitan areas, as well as statistics about the number of Jews as a percentage of the total city or town population.

== Jewish population by metropolitan area ==
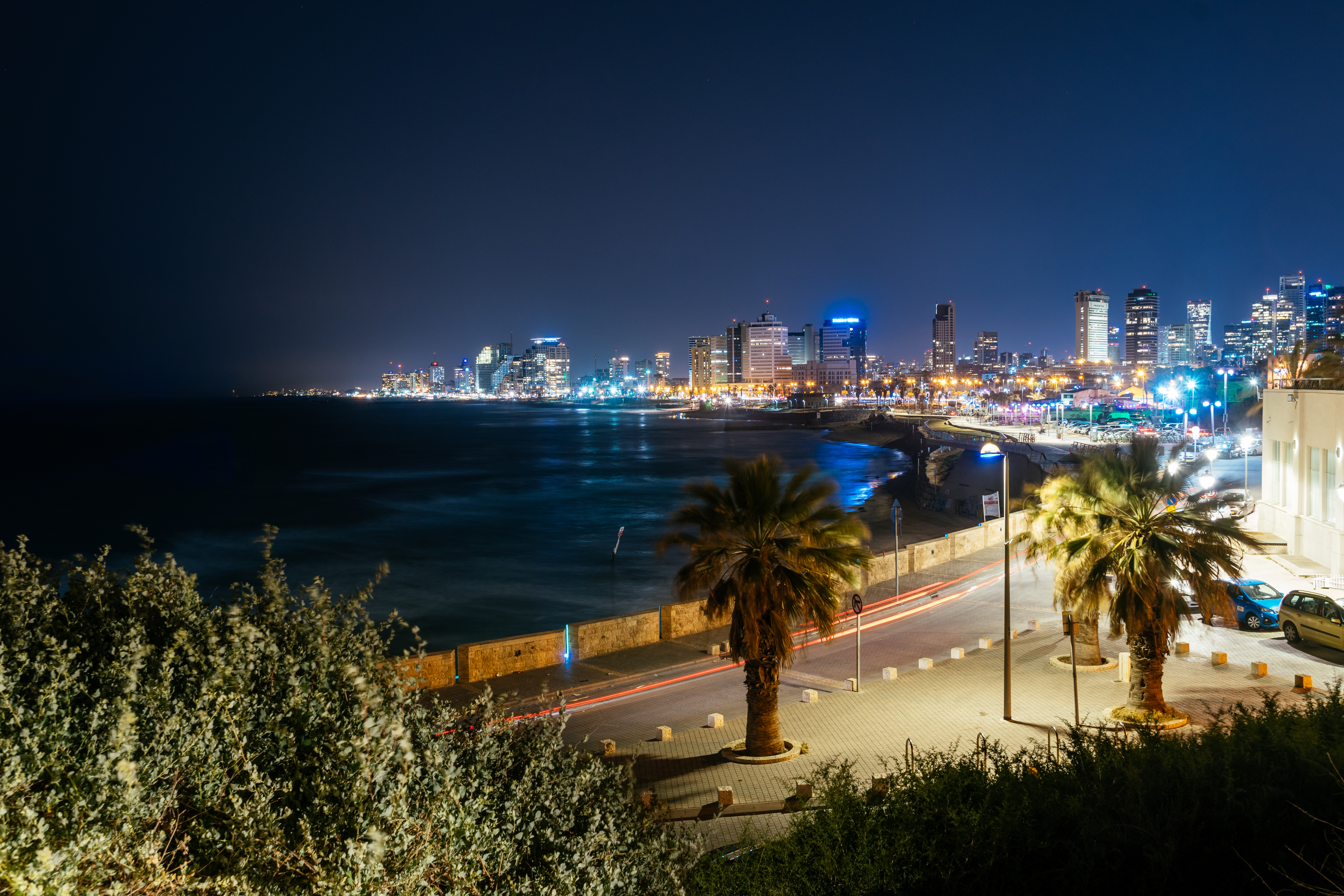
The Tel Aviv metropolitan area concentrates the largest Jewish population in the world

The global Jewish population is heavily concentrated in major urban centers. As of 2021, more than half (51.2%) of world Jewry resided in just ten metropolitan areas. Nearly all these key centers of Jewish settlement typically include national or regional capitals with high standards of living, advanced infrastructure supporting higher education and technology sectors, and extensive transnational connections. The table below shows only metropolitan areas with Jewish population above 100,000 as of 2021:

Metropolitan area	Country	Number	% of Jews out of total population
Tel Aviv	Israel	3,891,000	94.8
New York City	United States	2,109,300	10.8
Jerusalem	Israel	992,800	72.3
Haifa	Israel	710,600	73.1
Los Angeles	United States	622,480	4.7
Miami	United States	535,500	8.7
Philadelphia	United States	419,850	6.8
Paris	France	337,600	2.8
Washington, D.C.	United States	297,290	4.7
Chicago	United States	294,280	3.1
Boston	United States	257,460	5.2
Be'er Sheva	Israel	247,600	60.4
San Francisco	United States	244,000	5.1
London	United Kingdom	230,400	2.4
Buenos Aires	Argentina	230,300	1.4
Toronto	Canada	219,900	4.5
Atlanta	United States	119,800	2.0
Baltimore	United States	117,800	4.1
San Diego	United States	100,000	3.0

== Jewish population by city proper ==
Visualization of Urban Areas by Jewish Population

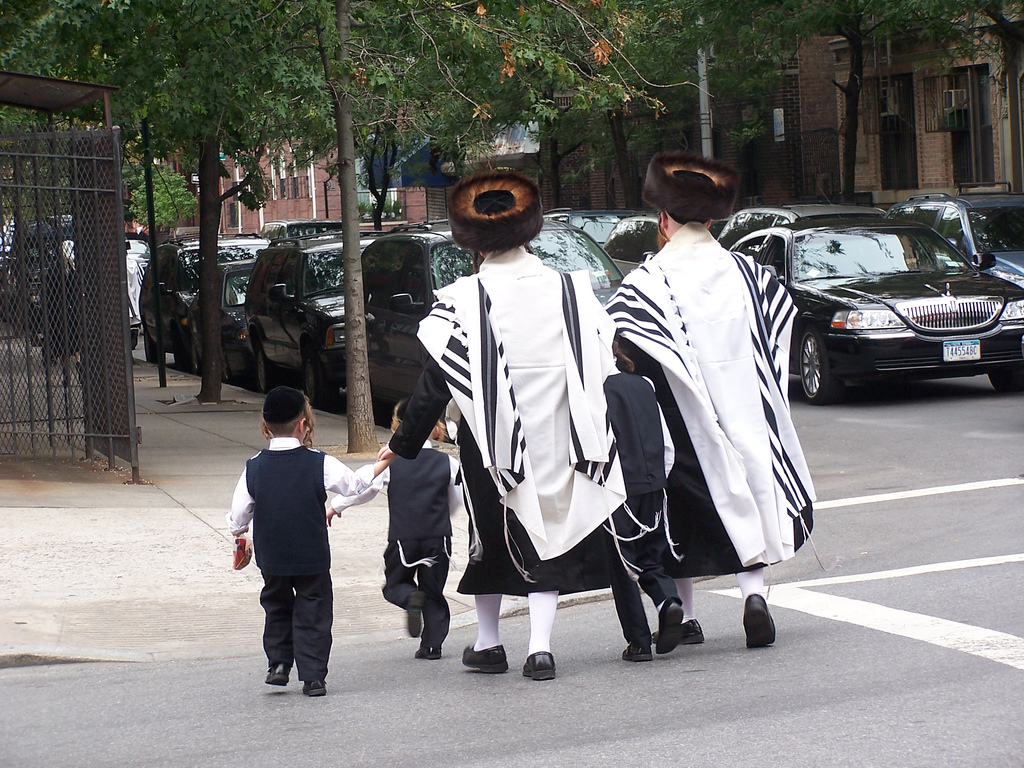
Haredi Jewish residents in Brooklyn, and home to the US largest Jewish community, which with over 561,000 adherents living in the borough, is greater than Tel Aviv.

New York City is home to the largest Jewish community in any city proper in the world. In 2011, according to the UJA-Federation of New York, the five boroughs of New York City proper was home to 1,086,000 Jews, representing 13% of the city's population. As of 2023, 960,000 Jews live in the city, with nearly half of them living in Brooklyn.

Census enumerations in many countries do not record religious or ethnic background, leading to a lack of certainty regarding the exact numbers of Jewish adherents. Therefore, the following list of cities ranked by Jewish population is not complete. In particular, it excludes many Jewish-majority cities in Israel. Many of the U.S. cities have their data sourced from the Jewish Data Bank, which records population statistics for service areas that encompass many counties in a metropolitan area.

City	Country	Number
New York City	United States	960,000
Jerusalem	Israel	570,100
Los Angeles	United States	519,200
Tel Aviv	Israel	401,500
Chicago	United States	291,800
Paris	France	277,000
Boston	United States	248,000
Buenos Aires	Argentina	244,000
Rishon LeZiyyon	Israel	229,300
San Francisco Bay Area	United States	227,800
Petah Tikva	Israel	220,900
Bnei Brak	Israel	218,300
Haifa	Israel	217,600
Philadelphia	United States	214,600
Ashdod	Israel	200,400
Netanya	Israel	196,300
Toronto	Canada	188,710
Be'er Sheva	Israel	181,000
Holon	Israel	180,900
Ramat Gan	Israel	175,000
Moscow	Russia	165,000
Beit Shemesh	Israel	154,600
London	United Kingdom	145,480
Atlanta	United States	119,800
Miami	United States	119,000
Kyiv	Ukraine	111,000
San Diego	United States	100,000
Baltimore	United States	95,400
Cleveland	United States	93,200
Montreal	Canada	90,780
Denver	United States	83,900
Phoenix	United States	82,900
Las Vegas	United States	80,000
Budapest	Hungary	80,000
São Paulo	Brazil	75,000
Detroit	United States	71,750
Marseille	France	70,000
Minneapolis-St Paul	United States	64,800
Seattle	United States	63,400
Dnipro	Ukraine	60,000
Dallas	United States	57,800
Melbourne	Australia	55,643
St. Louis	United States	54,500
Tampa	United States	51,100
Sydney	Australia	50,000
Johannesburg	South Africa	30,000
Pittsburgh	United States	49,200
Houston	United States	48,400
Portland	United States	47,500
Odesa	Ukraine	45,000
Kharkiv	Ukraine	45,000
Saint Petersburg	Russia	40,000
Rio de Janeiro	Brazil	40,000
Mexico City	Mexico	39,777
Hartford	United States	34,500
New Haven	United States	29,700
Washington, D.C.	United States	28,000
Cincinnati	United States	27,000
Vancouver	Canada	26,255
Milwaukee	United States	25,800
Manchester	United Kingdom	25,000
Berlin	Germany	25,000
Lyon	France	25,000
Istanbul	Turkey	24,000
Toulouse	France	23,000
Tucson	United States	22,900
Rochester	United States	22,500
Columbus	United States	22,500
Montevideo	Uruguay	20,000
Amsterdam	Netherlands	20,000
Antwerp	Belgium	20,000
Brussels	Belgium	20,000
Nice	France	20,000
Kansas City	United States	19,000
Orlando	United States	19,000
Austin	United States	16,300
Strasbourg	France	16,000
Cape Town	South Africa	12,500
Porto Alegre	Brazil	15,000
Jacksonville	United States	15,000
Panama City	Panama	15,000
Providence	United States	14,200
Louisville	United States	14,200
Ottawa	Canada	14,010
Winnipeg	Canada	13,690
Rome	Italy	13,000
Buffalo	United States	13,000
San Antonio	United States	12,740
Richmond	United States	12,500
Albany	United States	12,500
Charlotte	United States	12,000
New Orleans	United States	12,000
Nashville	United States	11,000
Singapore	Singapore	10,500
Frankfurt	Germany	10,500
Indianapolis	United States	10,000
Munich	Germany	9,200
Córdoba	Argentina	9,000
Stockholm	Sweden	9,000
Calgary	Canada	8,335
Milan	Italy	8,000
Rosario	Argentina	8,000
Leeds	United Kingdom	8,000
Grenoble	France	8,000
Memphis	United States	7,800
Syracuse	United States	7,000
Vienna	Austria	7,000
Chapel Hill	United States	6,000
Raleigh	United States	6,000
Zurich	Switzerland	6,000
Edmonton	Canada	5,550
Birmingham	United States	5,300
Perth	Australia	5,187
Hamilton	Canada	5,110
Hong Kong	Hong Kong	5,000
El Paso	United States	5,000
Madison	United States	5,000
Santa Fe	Argentina	5,000
Bogotá	Colombia	5,500
Minsk	Belarus	4,800
Metz	France	4,000
Nancy	France	4,000
Dayton	United States	4,000
Toledo	United States	3,900
Glasgow	United Kingdom	3,500
Youngstown	United States	3,200
Prague	Czech Republic	3,000
Greensboro	United States	3,000
Liverpool	United Kingdom	3,000
Victoria	Canada	2,740
Durban	South Africa	2,700
London	Canada	2,675
Chișinău	Moldova	2,649
Bucharest	Romania	2,481
Binghamton	United States	2,400
Brisbane	Australia	2,195
Halifax	Canada	2,120
Kitchener-Waterloo	Canada	2,015
Punta del Este	Uruguay	2,000
Curitiba	Brazil	1,774
Ithaca	United States	2,000
Belo Horizonte	Brazil	1,714
Oshawa	Canada	1,670
Gothenburg	Sweden	1,600
Windsor	Canada	1,515
İzmir	Turkey	1,500
Pretoria	South Africa	1,500
Barrie	Canada	1,445
Dublin	Ireland	1,439
St. Catharines-Niagara	Canada	1,375
Recife	Brazil	1,300
Helsinki	Finland	1,200
Montgomery	United States	1,200
Kingston	Canada	1,185
Brasília	Brazil	1,103
Florence	Italy	1,000
Basel	Switzerland	1,000
Casablanca	Morocco	1,000
Asunción	Paraguay	1,000
Malmö	Sweden	1,000
Oslo	Norway	950
Guelph	Canada	925
Regina	Canada	900
Kelowna	Canada	900
Guadalajara	Mexico	900
Bratislava	Slovakia	800
Monaco	Monaco	700
Monterrey	Mexico	500

== Jewish population by towns and villages as a percentage of total population ==
List does not include cities in Israel.

City	Country	Percent	Number
Qırmızı Qəsəbə	Azerbaijan	100	3,300
Kiryas Joel	United States	99	22,000
Deal	United States	91	600
Beachwood	United States	90.4	10,700
Boca Raton	United States	70.8	71,000
Great Neck	United States	70	28,700
Côte-Saint-Luc	Canada	69.1	20,146
Huntington Woods	United States	65	4,050
Lakewood	United States	59	59,607
Teaneck	United States	50	18,000
Dover Heights	Australia	48.5	1,840
Golders Green	United Kingdom	47.9	7,358
Stamford Hill	United Kingdom	47	4,138
Livingston	United States	46	12,600
Caulfield North	Australia	41.4	6,319
Hendon	United Kingdom	35.8	7,155
Caulfield South	Australia	33.9	4,008
Rose Bay	Australia	27.3	2,744
Sarcelles	France	25	15,000
Mercer Island	United States	25	5,000
St Kilda East	Australia	24.8	3,246
Créteil	France	24.4	22,000
Vaucluse	Australia	23.2	2,163
Westmount	Canada	23.2	4,495
Bellevue Hill	Australia	21.4	2,300
Dollard-des-Ormeaux	Canada	21.1	10,115
Vaughan	Canada	18.2	33,090
Elsternwick	Australia	17.8	1,846
Montreal West	Canada	13.8	710
Newton, Massachusetts	United States	21	18,000
New York	United States	18	1,540,000
Los Angeles	United States	12.5	519,000
Mount Royal	Canada	12.0	2,205
Marseille	France	9	70,000
Buenos Aires	Argentina	8.22	244,000
Newton Mearns	United Kingdom	5.98	1,431
Philadelphia	United States	4.89	276,000
Budapest	Hungary	4.55	80,000
Toronto	Canada	4.21	103,500
San Jose, California	United States	4	40,000

== See also ==
- Jewish population by country
