= List of cities in Israel =

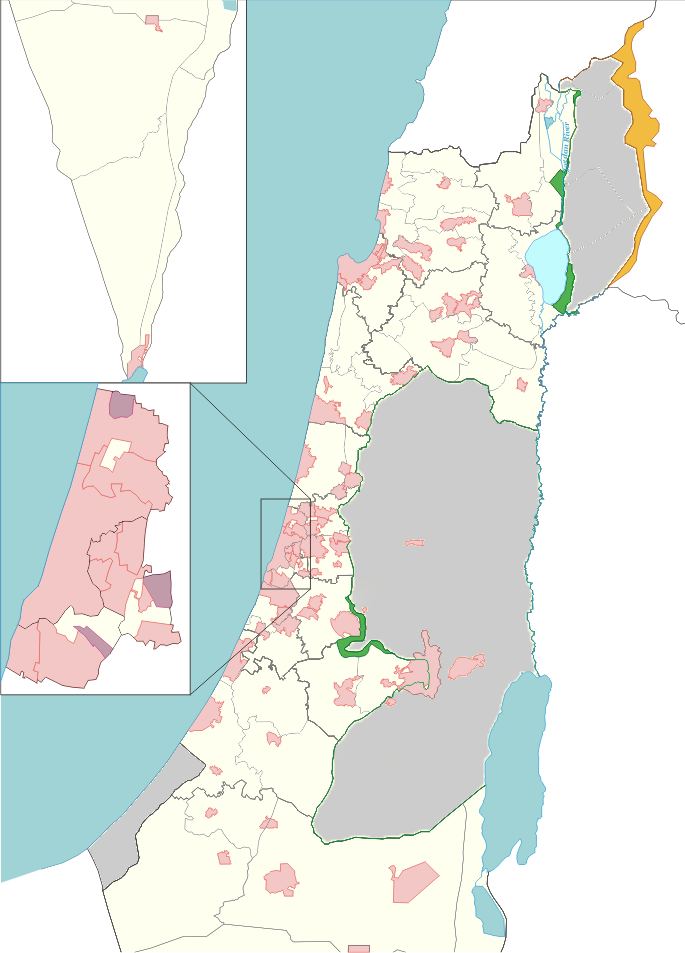

This article lists the 78 localities in Israel that the Israeli Ministry of Interior has designated as a city council.

The list is based on the current index of the Israel Central Bureau of Statistics (CBS). Within Israel's system of local government, an urban municipality can be granted a city council by the Interior Ministry when its population exceeds 20,000. The term "city" does not generally refer to local councils or urban agglomerations, even though a defined city often contains only a small portion of an urban area or metropolitan area's population.

== List of cities ==
Israel cities and districts including the Israeli occupied Golan Heights

As for 2025, Israel has 18 cities with populations over 100,000, including Jerusalem and Tel Aviv-Yafo. In all, there are 80 Israeli localities granted "municipalities" (or "city") status by the Ministry of the Interior, including four Israeli settlements in the West Bank. Two more cities, Kasif and Tila, are planned to be built in the Negev. The area and population of Jerusalem includes that of East Jerusalem which has been de facto annexed by Israel and incorporated within Jerusalem's municipal borders under the Jerusalem Law. This, however, is not recognized by the international community who regard East Jerusalem to be Palestinian territory held under Israeli occupation. If East Jerusalem is considered part of Israel, Tel Aviv is the country's second most populous city with 494,900 residents after Jerusalem with 1,050,153; if not, Tel Aviv is the most populous city, followed by West Jerusalem with 362,960.

The following table lists Israeli cities, not including the settlements, by name, district, population, area, and the Socio-Economic Index, according to the Israel Central Bureau of Statistics:

Name	Photo	District	Metro area	Founded	Area (km^{2})	Population				SEI
Name	Photo	District	Metro area	Founded	Area (km^{2})	Estimate (2024)	Census (2022)	Change (2022– –2024)	Density (per km^{2})	SEI
Acre (Note: Akko)		North	Haifa	Bronze Age	18.09	52,885	50,555	+5%	2,923	−0.467
Afula		North	—N/a	Bronze Age	29.17	66,362	60,828	+9%	2,275	−0.327
Arad		South	—N/a	1962 (Note: Tel Arad, remains of the ancient town, lies west of the modern city.)	126.13	29,504	27,586	+7%	234	−0.876
Arraba (Note: Arrabe)		North	—N/a	Antiquity	8.4	27,175	26,119	+4%	3,235	−0.728
Ashdod		South	Gush Dan	1956 (Note: Tel Ashdod, remains of the ancient town, lies east of the modern city.)	63.9	228,562	227,865	0%	3,577	−0.246
Ashkelon (Note: Ashqelon)		South	—N/a	Neolithic	52.32	166,864	152,370	+10%	3,189	−0.135
Baqa al-Gharbiyye		Haifa	—N/a	Middle Ages	9.18	31,275	29,868	+5%	3,407	−0.560
Bat Yam		Tel Aviv	Gush Dan	1926	9.41	129,494	128,152	+1%	13,761	−0.219
Be'er Ya'akov (Note: Be'er Ya'aqov)		Center	Gush Dan	1907	9.46	37,491	31,439	+19%	3,963	0.783
Beersheba (Note: Be'er Sheva)		South	Beersheba	1900 (Note: Tel Be'er Sheva, remains of the ancient town, lies east of the modern city.)	117.39	223,587	217,577	+3%	1,905	−0.111
Beit She'an (Note: Bet She'an)		North	—N/a	Neolithic	10.97	20,252	19,825	+2%	1,846	−0.392
Beit Shemesh (Note: Bet Shemesh)		Jerusalem	Jerusalem	1950 (Note: Tel Beit Shemesh, remains of the ancient town, lies west of the modern city.)	38.29	176,786	145,554	+21%	4,617	−1.485
Bnei Brak (Note: Bene Beraq)		Tel Aviv	Gush Dan	1924 (Note: Beneberak, remains of the ancient town, lies south of the modern city.)	7.35	229,996	216,869	+6%	31,292	−1.627
Dimona		South	—N/a	1955	220.46	39,590	37,213	+6%	180	−0.387
Eilat (Note: Elat)		South	—N/a	1951	101.49	56,004	55,213	+1%	552	0.151
El'ad		Center	Gush Dan	1998	3.49	50,846	48,825	+4%	14,569	−1.452
Ganei Tikva (Note: Ganne Tiqwa)		Center	Gush Dan	1949	2.16	25,488	23,650	+8%	11,800	1.474
Giv'at Shmuel (Note: Giv'at Shemu'el)		Center	Gush Dan	1944	2.58	29,405	27,472	+7%	11,397	1.135
Givatayim (Note: Giv'atayim)		Tel Aviv	Gush Dan	1922	3.24	58,601	58,052	+1%	18,087	1.569
Hadera		Haifa	—N/a	1891	56.28	107,974	103,847	+4%	1,919	0.184
Haifa		Haifa	Haifa	Antiquity	72.93	297,082	289,507	+3%	4,074	0.391
Harish		Haifa	—N/a	1982	9	41,574	31,733	+31%	4,619	−0.182
Herzliya (Note: Herzliyya)		Tel Aviv	Gush Dan	1924	24.07	110,884	105,273	+5%	4,607	1.361
Hod HaSharon		Center	Gush Dan	1924	19.26	66,398	65,020	+2%	3,447	1.567
Holon		Tel Aviv	Gush Dan	1935	19.04	191,829	192,655	0%	10,075	0.371
Jerusalem		Jerusalem	Jerusalem	Neolithic (Old City of Jerusalem) mid-1800s (New City of Jerusalem)	125.55	1,050,153	1,005,919	+4%	8,364	−1.196
Kafr Qara (Note: Kafar Qara)		Haifa	—N/a	?	7.81	21,066	19,890	+6%	2,697	−0.112
Kafr Qasim (Note: Kafar Qasem)		Center	Gush Dan	19th century	9.3	27,996	26,389	+6%	3,010	−0.574
Karmiel (Note: Karmi'el)		North	—N/a	1964	22.03	47,941	47,450	+1%	2,176	0.020
Kfar Saba (Note: Kefar Sava)		Center	Gush Dan	1903	14.48	99,410	100,262	−1%	6,865	1.192
Kfar Yona (Note: Kefar Yona)		Center	Gush Dan	1932	11.51	29,820	28,135	+6%	2,591	0.781
Kiryat Ata (Note: Qiryat Atta)		Haifa	Haifa	1925	24.16	62,585	60,465	+4%	2,590	0.090
Kiryat Bialik (Note: Qiryat Bialik)		Haifa	Haifa	1934	8.48	47,073	44,806	+5%	5,551	0.328
Kiryat Gat (Note: Qiryat Gat)		South	—N/a	1954	15.85	72,140	63,386	+14%	4,551	−0.552
Kiryat Malakhi (Note: Qiryat Mal'akhi)		South	Gush Dan	1950	4.58	27,959	26,362	+6%	6,105	−0.671
Kiryat Motzkin (Note: Qiryat Motzkin)		Haifa	Haifa	1934	3.84	51,488	49,057	+5%	13,408	0.402
Kiryat Ono (Note: Qiryat Ono)		Tel Aviv	Gush Dan	1939 (Note: Ono, remains of the ancient town, lies south of the modern city.)	4.6	45,049	41,537	+8%	9,793	1.594
Kiryat Shmona (Note: Qiryat Shemona)		North	—N/a	1949	14.38	24,437	23,083	+6%	1,699	−0.163
Kiryat Yam (Note: Qiryat Yam)		Haifa	Haifa	1941	11.34	41,957	38,906	+8%	3,700	−0.247
Lod		Center	Gush Dan	Neolithic	14.79	94,189	87,430	+8%	6,368	−0.738
Ma'alot-Tarshiha		North	—N/a	1963	9.26	23,042	22,720	+1%	2,488	−0.057
Maghar (Note: Mughar)		North	—N/a	?	21.11	23,486	22,564	+4%	1,113	−0.793
Migdal HaEmek (Note: Migdal HaEmeq)		North	—N/a	1953	8.71	28,430	27,045	+5%	3,264	−0.398
Modi'in-Maccabim-Re'ut (Note: Modi'in-Makkabbim-Re'ut)		Center	Gush Dan	1985	48.33	100,052	92,307	+8%	2,070	1.420
Nahariya (Note: Nahariyya)		North	Haifa	1935	13.83	67,877	63,318	+7%	4,908	0.143
Nazareth		North	—N/a	Bronze Age	14.17	75,704	77,295	−2%	5,343	−0.704
Nesher		Haifa	Haifa	1923	12.94	22,896	22,911	0%	1,769	0.564
Ness Ziona (Note: Nes Ziyyona)		Center	Gush Dan	1883	15.68	47,267	47,620	−1%	3,014	1.304
Netanya		Center	Gush Dan	1929	34.75	234,813	223,920	+5%	6,757	0.084
Netivot		South	—N/a	1956	16.22	56,019	45,024	+24%	3,454	−0.762
Nof HaGalil		North	—N/a	1957	32.86	45,805	43,479	+5%	1,394	−0.298
Ofakim (Note: Ofaqim)		South	Beersheba	1955	16.35	39,893	35,355	+13%	2,440	−0.730
Or Akiva (Note: Or Aqiva)		Haifa	—N/a	1951	5.55	25,922	22,173	+17%	4,671	−0.009
Or Yehuda		Tel Aviv	Gush Dan	1955	6.73	41,130	36,850	+12%	6,111	0.005
Petah Tikva (Note: Petah Tiqwa)		Center	Gush Dan	1878	35.77	270,403	264,046	+2%	7,559	0.550
Qalansawe		Center	Gush Dan	Middle Ages	8.37	25,167	23,951	+5%	3,007	−0.732
Ra'anana (Note: Ra'annana)		Center	Gush Dan	1922	14.86	82,964	80,155	+4%	5,583	1.280
Rahat		South	Beersheba	1972	33.48	77,997	71,355	+9%	2,330	−1.845
Ramat Gan		Tel Aviv	Gush Dan	1921	16.39	172,242	165,155	+4%	10,509	1.099
Ramat HaSharon		Tel Aviv	Gush Dan	1923	16.73	48,860	48,986	0%	2,921	1.699
Ramla		Center	Gush Dan	8th century	13.39	86,052	81,126	+6%	6,427	−0.399
Rehovot		Center	Gush Dan	1890	23.76	155,049	150,471	+3%	6,526	0.601
Rishon LeZion (Note: Rishon LeZiyyon)		Center	Gush Dan	1882	61.91	259,275	252,413	+3%	4,188	0.727
Rosh HaAyin		Center	Gush Dan	1949	15.86	79,023	74,572	+6%	4,983	0.781
Safed (Note: Zefat)		North	—N/a	Bronze Age	29.94	38,687	37,801	+2%	1,292	−1.351
Sakhnin		North	—N/a	Bronze Age	11.53	33,728	32,355	+4%	2,925	−0.511
Sderot (Note: Sederot)		South	—N/a	1951	10.66	37,239	31,108	+20%	3,493	−0.132
Shefa-Amr (Note: Shefar'am)		North	Haifa	Bronze Age	19.63	43,858	42,713	+3%	2,234	−0.712
Tamra		North	Haifa	?	29.77	36,918	35,349	+4%	1,240	−0.773
Tayibe		Center	Gush Dan	?	18.91	46,870	45,071	+4%	2,479	−0.680
Tel Aviv-Yafo		Tel Aviv	Gush Dan	Neolithic (Jaffa); 1887 (Neve Tzedek); 1909 (Ahuzat Bayit)	57.1	494,900	492,872	0%	8,667	1.293
Tiberias		North	—N/a	20	16.19	52,123	48,509	+7%	3,219	−0.779
Tira (Note: Tire)		Center	Gush Dan	?	11.85	27,680	26,567	+4%	2,336	−0.275
Tirat Carmel (Note: Tirat Karmel)		Haifa	Haifa	?	6.71	32,167	29,069	+11%	4,794	0.108
Umm al-Fahm		Haifa	—N/a	?	26.03	60,209	57,560	+5%	2,313	−1.266
Yavne		Center	Gush Dan	Bronze Age	29.18	58,090	54,981	+6%	1,991	0.514
Yehud-Monosson (Note: Yehud-Monoson)		Center	Gush Dan	?	5.73	32,146	30,977	+4%	5,610	0.963
Yokneam Illit (Note: Yoqne'am Illit)		North	Haifa	Chalcolithic (Tel Yokneam); 1950 (modern settlement)	8.31	24,928	23,729	+5%	3,000	0.795

== See also ==
- Arab localities in Israel
- Chronology of Aliyah in modern times
- Demographics of Israel
- Districts of Israel
- Four Holy Cities
- Jewish population by city
- List of cities in Palestine
- List of kibbutzim
- List of largest metropolitan areas in the Middle East
- List of modern names for biblical place names
- List of moshavim
- List of twin towns and sister cities in Israel
- List of villages depopulated during the Arab–Israeli conflict
- Lists of cities by country
- Population displacements in Israel after 1948
- Population statistics for Israeli settlements in the West Bank
- Urban planning in Israel

== Notes ==
General

Official spellings
