= Beersheba metropolitan area =

Metropolitan area in Israel

- Metropolitan area
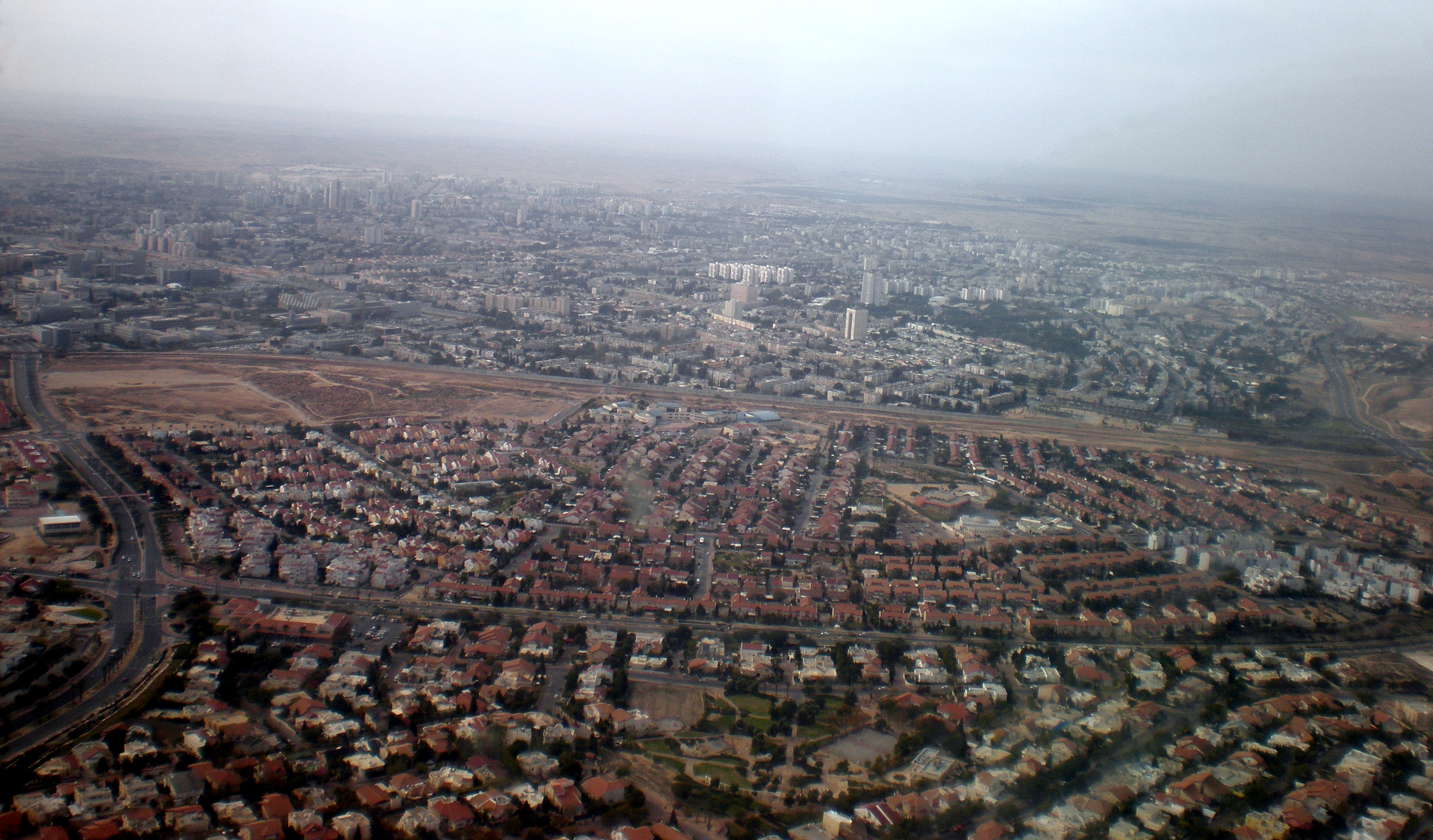
- Beersheba is the eighth largest city in Israel and the centre of the fourth largest metropolitan area in Israel.
- Interactive map of Beersheba metropolitan area
- Coordinates: 31°14′59.15″N 34°47′59.07″E
- Country: Israel

Population (2016)
  - Total: 377,100
  - Density: 556.8/km^{2} (1,442/sq mi)

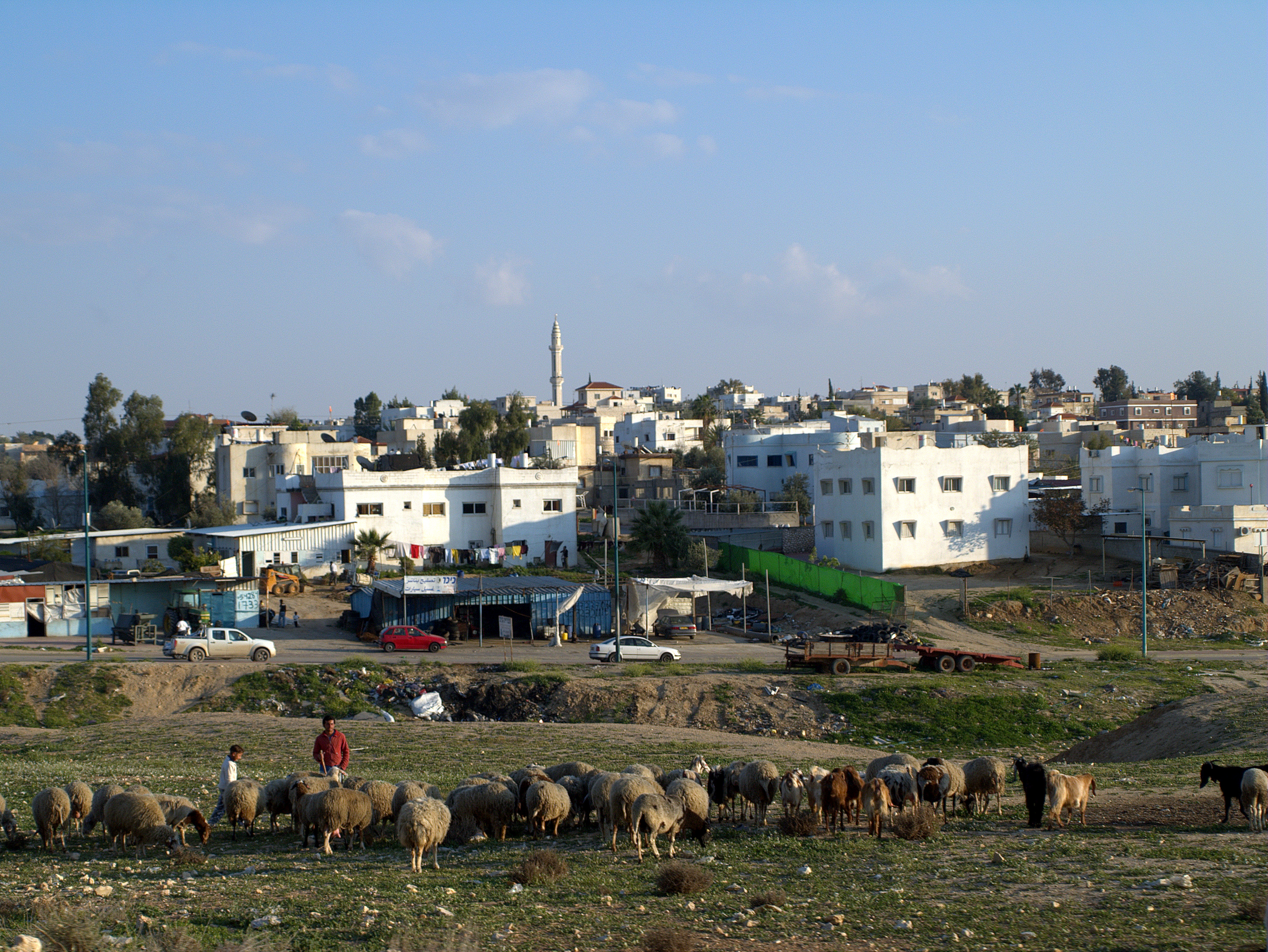
Rahat

Beersheba metropolitan area (Hebrew: מטרופולין באר שבע) is a metropolitan area in Israel that encompasses the Beersheba and Southern Districts of Israel. It is located in the Negev desert and constitutes the fourth largest metropolitan area in the country, with an estimated population of over 377,100.

== Metropolitan rings ==
Israel Central Bureau of Statistics divides the Beersheba metropolitan area into two areas:

Metropolitan rings in the Beersheba metropolitan area
| Metropolitan ring | Localities | Population (2016 estimate) | | | | Population density (per km^{2}) | Annual Population growth rate |
| Metropolitan ring | Localities | Total | Jews and others^{1} | Thereof: Jews | Arabs | Population density (per km^{2}) | Annual Population growth rate |
|---|---|---|---|---|---|---|---|
| Core^{2} | 1 | 205,800 | 200,800 | 180,300 | 5,000 | 1,752 | 1.1% |
| Outer Ring^{3} | 32 | 171,300 | 38,300 | 37,700 | 133,000 | 306 | 3.4% |
| Northern Section | 12 | 90,000 | 12,700 | 12,400 | 77,300 | 292 | 3.4% |
| Eastern Section | 8 | 71,500 | 15,800 | 15,500 | 55,800 | 562.3 | 3.5% |
| Western Section | 12 | 9,800 | 9,800 | 9,700 | 0 | 78.6 | 3.6% |
| Total | 33 | 377,100 | 239,000 | 217,900 | 138,100 | 556.8 | 2.1% |

Notes

- ^{1} The population of "Jews and others" incl. Jews, non-Arab Christians and those not classified by religion.
- ^{2} Includes the city of Beersheba.
- ^{3} Includes the cities Rahat, the local councils Lehavim, Omer and Tel Sheva, as well as many smaller towns (local councils).

== Transportation ==
=== Transit ===
Rail service connects the Beersheba metropolitan area with Ashkelon, Tel Aviv and Haifa. Bus service connects to Eilat, Ashkelon, Tel Aviv, Haifa, and Jerusalem.

=== Major highways ===
- Highway 40
- Highway 25
- Highway 31
- Highway 60
- Highway 80

== See also ==
- List of cities in Israel
