= Haifa metropolitan area =

Metropolitan area surrounding the city of Haifa in northern Israel

- Metropolitan area
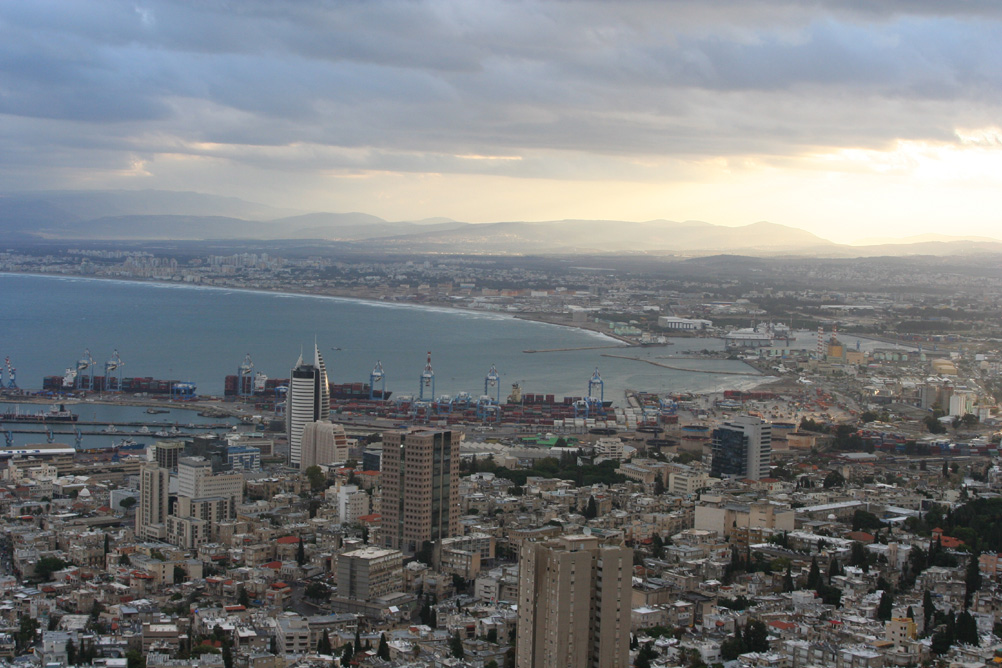
- Haifa is the third largest city in Israel and the centre of the Haifa metropolitan area.
- Interactive map of Haifa metropolitan area
- Coordinates: 32°48′45.77″N 34°59′56.93″E
- Country: Israel

Population (2026)
  - Total: 1,215,000
  - Density: 1,099.1/km^{2} (2,847/sq mi)

The Haifa metropolitan area (Hebrew: מטרופולין חיפה) is a metropolitan area including areas from both the Haifa and the Northern districts of Israel. It is located along the Israeli Mediterranean coastline. With an estimated population of over 1.2 million, the Haifa metropolitan area is the third largest metropolitan area in Israel, behind Gush Dan and Greater Jerusalem.

== Metropolitan rings ==
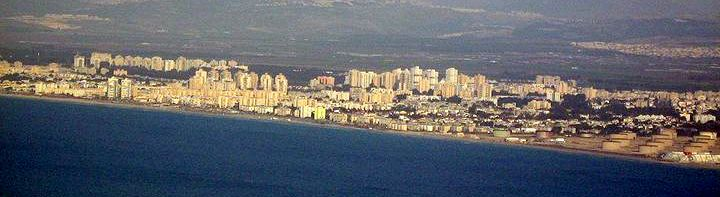
The Krayot.

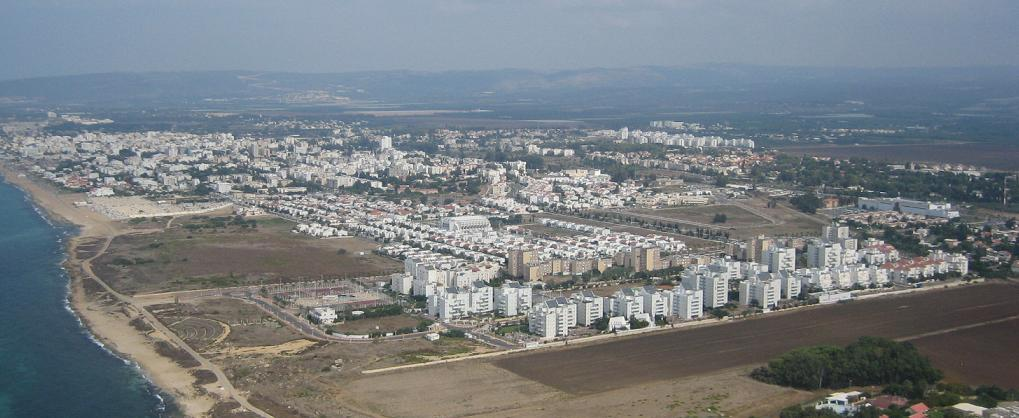
Nahariya.

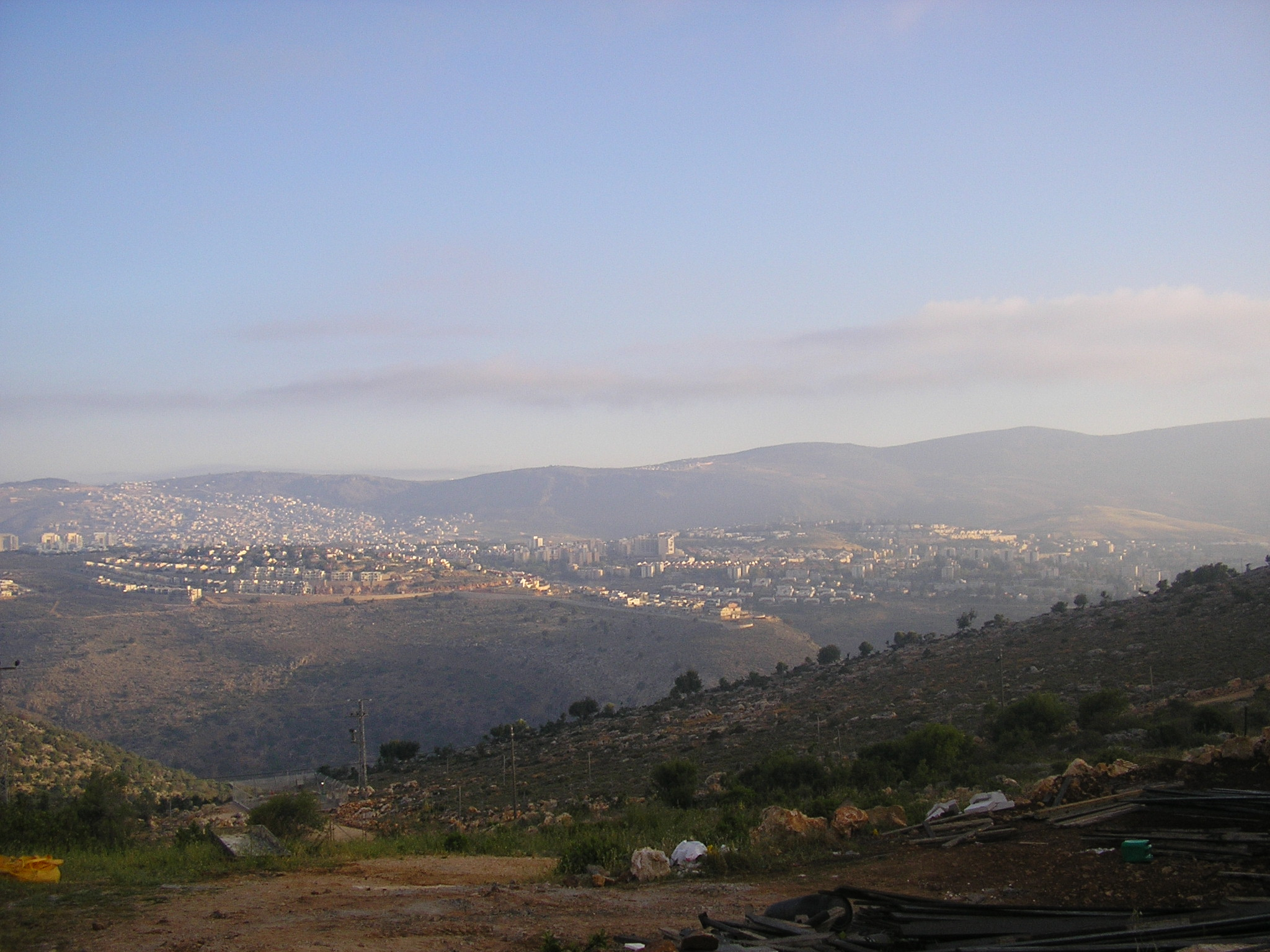
Karmiel.

Israel Central Bureau of Statistics divides the Haifa metropolitan area into three areas:

Metropolitan rings in the Haifa metropolitan area
| Metropolitan ring | Localities | Population (2021 estimate) | | | | Population density (per km^{2}) | Annual Population growth rate |
| Metropolitan ring | Localities | Total | Jews and others^{1} | Thereof: Jews | Arabs | Population density (per km^{2}) | Annual Population growth rate |
|---|---|---|---|---|---|---|---|
| Core^{2} | 1 | 282,800 | 248,400 | 211,800 | 34,400 | 4,304 | −0.3% |
| Inner Ring^{3} | 32 | 355,100 | 319,200 | 289,300 | 35,900 | 1,277.1 | 2.1% |
| Northern Section | 3 | 129,300 | 129,100 | 112,700 | 200 | 5,887.7 | 1.9% |
| Eastern Section | 16 | 104,400 | 99,800 | 94,100 | 4,600 | 1,208.4 | 1.4% |
| Southern Section | 13 | 121,400 | 90,300 | 82,400 | 31,200 | 715.6 | 2.9% |
| Outer Ring^{4} | 70 | 345,600 | 150,600 | 136,100 | 195,000 | 700.2 | 1.4% |
| Northern Section | 44 | 295,200 | 122,900 | 109,100 | 172,300 | 966.3 | 1.5% |
| Eastern Section | 13 | 40,400 | 18,100 | 17,700 | 22,400 | 515.8 | 1.3% |
| Southern Section | 13 | 10,000 | 9,700 | 9,400 | 300 | 91.2 | 0.3% |
| Total | 103 | 983,500 | 718,200 | 637,300 | 265,400 | 1,174.6 | 1.2% |

Notes

- ^{1} The population of "Jews and others" includes Jews, non-Arab Christians and those not classified by religion.
- ^{2} The core area includes the city of Haifa.
- ^{3} The inner ring consists of the Haifa District and includes the cities Kiryat Bialik, Kiryat Yam, Kiryat Motzkin, Kiryat Ata, Tirat Carmel and Nesher, as well as a multitude of smaller towns (local councils).
- ^{4} The outer ring includes the cities Tamra, Karmiel, Acre, Shfar'am and Nahariya, as well as many smaller towns (local councils).

== Economy ==
=== Business districts ===
- Downtown Haifa – the central business district of Haifa. This area has the port of Haifa, many shops and some beaches
- Bay area, Haifa – between Haifa and the Krayot. This area has some malls and businesses. This area is also an important transport center with buses to Haifa and the northern part of the country, and trains to the central and southern parts of the country
- Matam Park, Haifa – Hi-tech park in the south of the city. This park has the offices of Google, Microsoft and Yahoo! of Israel. Matam also has the IEC Tower, one of the tallest in the city
- Carmel Center neighborhood (Merkaz HaKarmel), Haifa – shops and restaurants
- Coastal strip of Haifa – from Downtown to Matam park
- HaGa'aton Boulevard, Nahariya – The main street of the city from the beaches to Highway 4. The street has shops, restaurants, some hotels and the railway and bus stations
- Coastal strip of Nahariya – some restaurants and one of northernmost coastal strips in the country
- Industrial park of Karmiel – in the east of the city

=== Shopping centers ===
Haifa

- Haifa Mall
- Grand canyon
- Lev HaMifratz Mall
- Horev center

Krayot

- HaKiryon
- Azrieli Kiryat Ata

Nahariya

- Nahariya Mall
- Kanyon HaTzafon (The north mall)

Karmiel

- Hotzot Karmiel Mall

Akko

- Azrieli Akko

Shefaram

- Shefaram mall

== Transportation ==
The bus company Egged runs many lines within Haifa and some lines connecting Haifa with other cities in the metropolitan area. Israel's national highway network connects Haifa with other metropolitan areas, cities and suburbs. Haifa Airport serves domestics flights to Eilat and international flights to Cyprus and Greece. Israel Railways runs inter city lines to other cities in the country and one commuter line from Haifa to its northern suburbs. There are plans for two new lines to its eastern suburbs.

=== Major highways ===
The major highways in the Haifa metropolitan area include Area are:

- Highway 2 – connects Haifa with Tel Aviv.
- Highway 4 – connects all Israeli coastal plain cities and pass via Haifa city.
- Highway 75 – connects Haifa with Lower Galilee via Jezreel Valley.
- Highway 70 – connects Carmel plain with Western Galilee.
- Highway 85 – connects Akko with Upper Galilee.
- Highway 79 – connects Krayot area with Lower Galilee.

== Panoramas ==
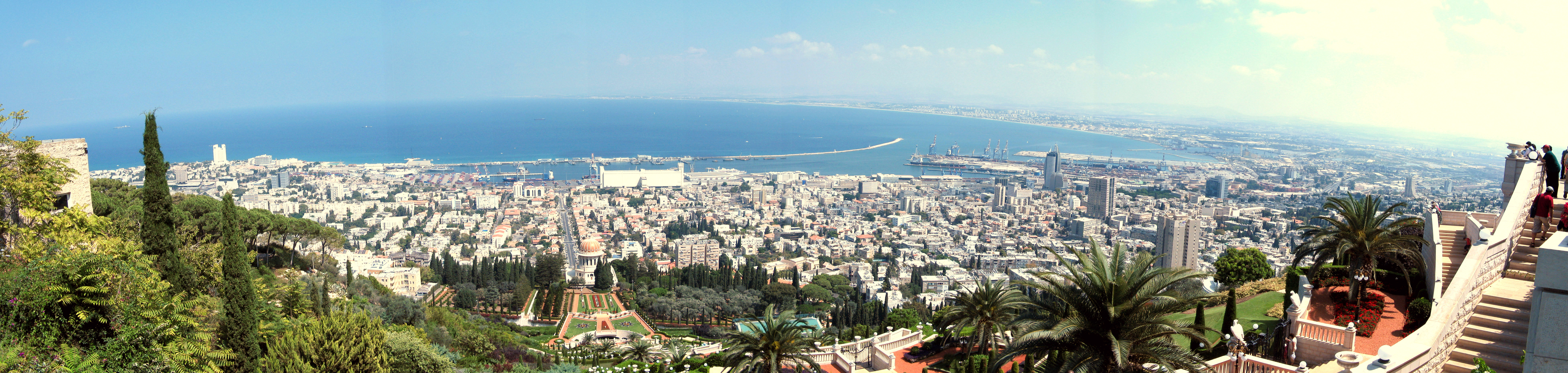
Panorama of Haifa taken from the Bahá'í World Centre on Mount Carmel

== See also ==
- List of cities in Israel
