= Israeli Jews =

Israel's ethnic and religious majority

Israeli Jews יהודים ישראלים
Total population
- Jewish citizens only: 7,208,000 (73.2%) Jews and non-Jewish relatives: 7,762,000 (78.9%)

Regions with significant populations
- Israel (incl. occupied territories): 7,208,000 (Note: The official CBS estimate of the Israeli Jewish population does not include Israelis who are not Jewish according to rabbinical law, but were eligible for Israeli citizenship under the Law of Return. They compose about 3–4% of Israeli citizens (300,000), and are mostly Russian-descendants of Jewish origin or family members who are not considered Jewish by the rabbinate.)
- United States: 500,000
- Russia: 100,000 (80,000 in Moscow)
- Germany: 24,000
- Canada: 10,755–30,000
- United Kingdom: ≈30,000
- Australia: 15,000

Languages
- Predominant: Hebrew, Russian, English, French, Judeo-Arabic, Yiddish, Amharic, Judeo-Spanish, other Jewish languages

Related ethnic groups
- Diaspora Jews, Samaritans, Arabs, etc. (Middle Eastern peoples)

Israeli Jews or Jewish Israelis (Hebrew: יהודים ישראלים Yêhūdīm Yīśrāʾēlīm) comprise Israel's largest ethnoreligious community. The core of their demographic consists of Jews and their descendants. About 46% of the global Jewish population resides in Israel; yerida is historically uncommon and offset by aliyah, (although in 2024 and 2025 Israel experienced net negative migration: yerida was higher than aliyah.); those who do emigrate from the country typically move to the Western world. As such, the Israeli diaspora is closely tied to the broader Jewish diaspora.

Israel is widely described as a melting pot for the various Jewish ethnic divisions, primarily consisting of Ashkenazi Jews, Sephardic Jews, and Mizrahi Jews, as well as many smaller Jewish communities, such as the Beta Israel, the Cochin Jews, the Bene Israel, and the Karaite Jews, among others. Over 25% of Jewish children and 35% of Jewish newborns in Israel are of mixed Ashkenazi and Sephardic or Mizrahi descent, and these figures have been increasing by approximately 0.5% annually: over 50% of Israel's entire Jewish population identifies as having Ashkenazi, Sephardic, and Mizrahi admixture. The integration of Judaism in Israeli Jewish life is split along four categories: the secularists (33%), the traditionalists (24%), the Orthodox (9%), and the Ultra-Orthodox (7%). In addition to religious influences, both Jewish history and Jewish culture serve as important aspects defining Israel's Jewish society, thereby contributing significantly to Israel's identity as the world's only Jewish-majority country.

In 2018, Israel's Knesset narrowly voted in favour of Basic Law: Israel as the Nation-State of the Jewish People. As the Israeli government considers a person's Jewish status to be a matter of nationality and citizenship, the definition of Jewishness in the Israeli Law of Return includes patrilineal Jewish descent; this does not align with the stipulations of Judaism's halakha, which defines Jewishness through matrilineality. As of 1970, all Jews by blood and their spouses automatically qualify for the right to immigrate to the country and acquire Israeli citizenship.

According to the Israel Central Bureau of Statistics, the Israeli Jewish population stood at 7,208,000 in 2023, comprising about 73% of the country's total population. Including non-Jewish relatives (e.g., spouses) raises this figure to 7,762,000, about 79% of the country's population. A 2008 Israel Democracy Institute study found that a plurality of Israeli Jews (47%) identify as Jews first and as Israelis second, and that 39% consider themselves Israelis first and foremost.

Upon the Israeli Declaration of Independence in 1948, the Palestinian Jews of the Yishuv in the British Mandate for Palestine became known as Israeli Jews due to their adoption of a new national identity. The former term has since fallen out of common use.

== History ==
=== Origins ===
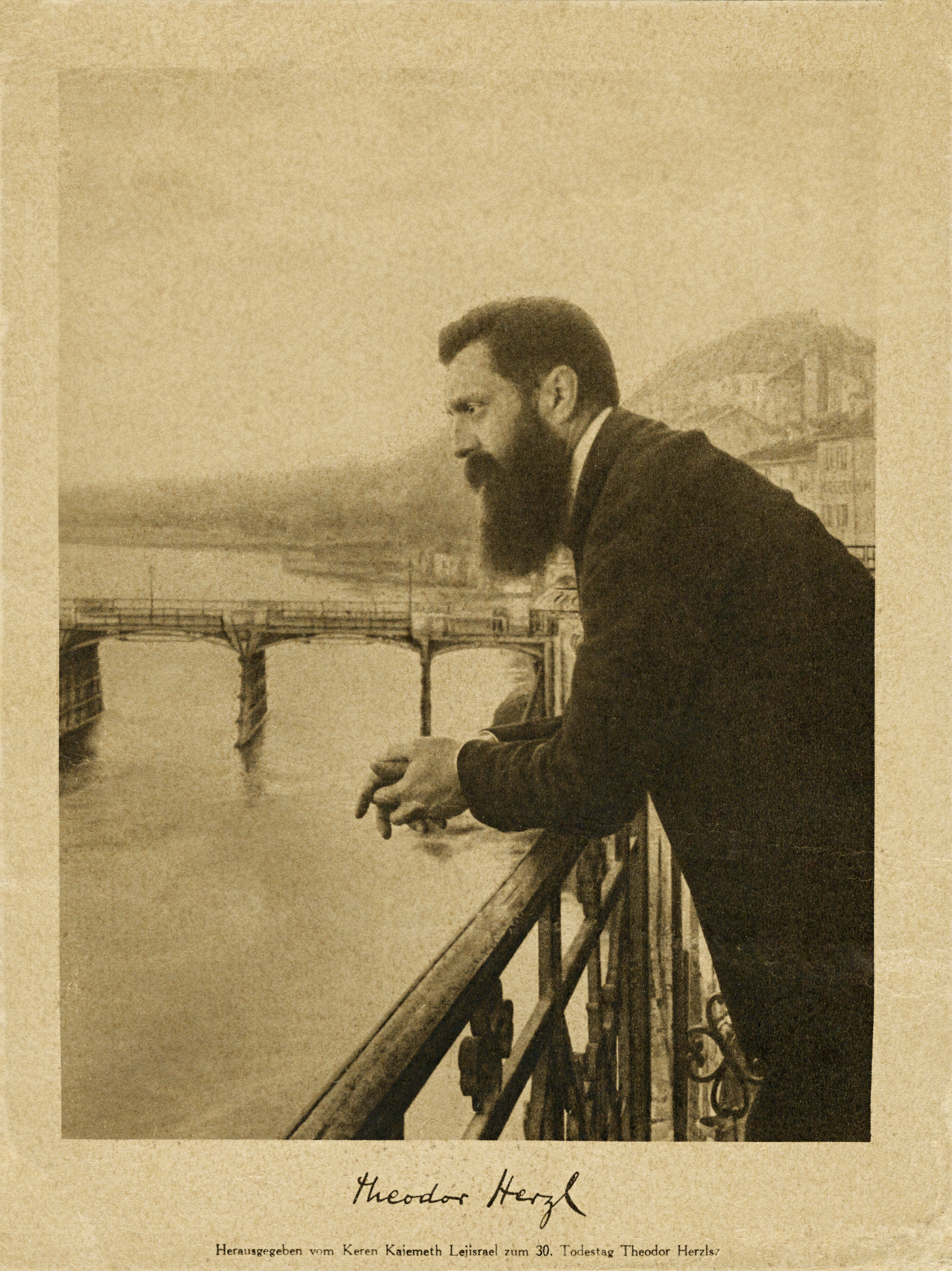
Theodor Herzl, visionary of the Jewish State, in Basel, photographed during Fifth Zionist Congress in December 1901, by Ephraim Moses Lilien

Jews have long considered the Land of Israel to be their homeland, even while living in the diaspora. According to the Hebrew Bible the connection to the Land of Israel began in the covenant of the pieces when the region, which is called the land of Canaan, was promised to Abraham by God. Abraham settled in the region, where his son Isaac and grandson Jacob grew up with their families. Later on, Jacob and his sons went to Egypt. Decades later their descendants were led out of Egypt by Moses and Aaron, given the Tablets of Stone, returned to the land of Canaan and conquered it under the leadership of Joshua. After the period of the judges, in which the Israelites did not have an organized leadership, the Kingdom of Israel was established, which constructed the First Temple. This kingdom was soon split into two—the Kingdom of Judah and the Kingdom of Israel. After the destruction of these kingdoms and the destruction of the First Temple, the Israelites were exiled to Babylon. After about 70 years parts of the Israelites were permitted to return to the region and soon thereafter they built the Second Temple. Later they established the Hasmonean Kingdom. The region was conquered by the Roman Empire in 63 BCE. During the first couple of centuries in the common era during a series of rebellions against the Roman Empire the Second Temple was destroyed and there was a general expulsion of Jews from their homeland.

The area was later conquered by migrant Arabs who invaded the Byzantine Empire and established a Muslim Caliphate in the 7th century during the rise of Islam. Throughout the centuries the size of the Jewish population in the land fluctuated. Before the birth of modern Zionism in the 1880s, by the early 19th century, more than 10,000 Jews were still living in the area that is today modern Israel.

Following centuries of Jewish diaspora, the 19th century saw the rise of Zionism, a Jewish nationalist movement that had a desire to see the self-determination of the Jewish people through the creation of a homeland for the Jews in Palestine. Significant numbers of Jews have immigrated to Palestine since the 1880s. Zionism remained a minority movement until the rise of Nazism in 1933 and the subsequently attempted extermination of the Jewish people in Nazi-occupied areas of Europe in the Holocaust. In the late 19th century large numbers of Jews began moving to the Ottoman and later British-controlled region. In 1917, the British endorsed a National Home for Jews in Mandate Palestine by issuing the Balfour Declaration. The Jewish population in the region increased from 11% of the population in 1922 to 30% by 1940.

In 1937, following the Great Arab Revolt, the partition plan proposed by the Peel Commission was rejected by both the Palestinian Arab leadership and the Zionist Congress. As a result, believing that their position in the Middle East in the event of a war depended on the support of the Arab states, Britain abandoned the idea of a Jewish state in 1939 in favour of a unitary state with a Jewish minority. The White Paper of 1939 capped Jewish immigration for five years, with further immigration dependent on the agreement of the Arabs. In the event, limited Jewish immigration was permitted until the end of the mandate.

In 1947, following increasing levels of violence, the British government decided to withdraw from Mandatory Palestine. The 1947 UN Partition Plan split the mandate (apart from Jerusalem) into two states, Jewish and Arab, giving about 56% of Mandatory Palestine to the Jewish state. Immediately following the adoption of the Partition Plan by the United Nations General Assembly, the Palestinian Arab leadership rejected the plan to create the as-yet-unnamed Jewish State and launched a guerrilla war.

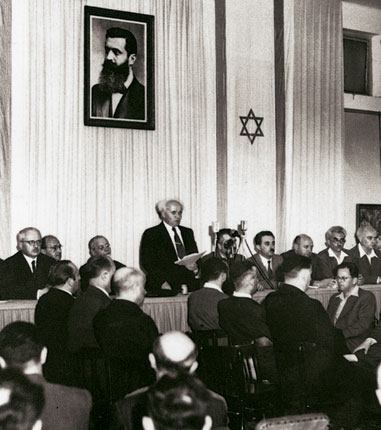
David Ben-Gurion proclaiming Israeli independence from the United Kingdom on 14 May 1948, below a portrait of Theodor Herzl

On 14 May 1948, one day before the end of the British Mandate of Palestine, the leaders of the Jewish community in Palestine led by prime minister David Ben-Gurion, made a declaration of independence, of the State of Israel though without any reference to defined borders.

=== 1948 Arab–Israeli War ===
The armies of Egypt, Lebanon, Syria, Jordan, and Iraq invaded the former mandate, thus starting the 1948 Arab–Israeli War. The nascent Israeli Defense Force repulsed the Arab nations from much of the former mandate, thus extending its borders beyond the original UNSCOP partition. By December 1948, Israel controlled much of Mandate Palestine west of the Jordan River. The remainder of the Mandate consisted of Jordan, the area that came to be called the West Bank (controlled by Jordan), and the Gaza Strip (controlled by Egypt). Prior to and during this conflict, 711,000 Palestinians Arabs fled their original lands to become Palestinian refugees. The reasons for this are disputed, and range from claims that the major cause of Palestinian flight was military actions by the Israel Defense Forces and fear of events such as the Deir Yassin massacre to an encouragement to leave by Arab leaders so that they could return when the war was won.

=== 1949–present ===
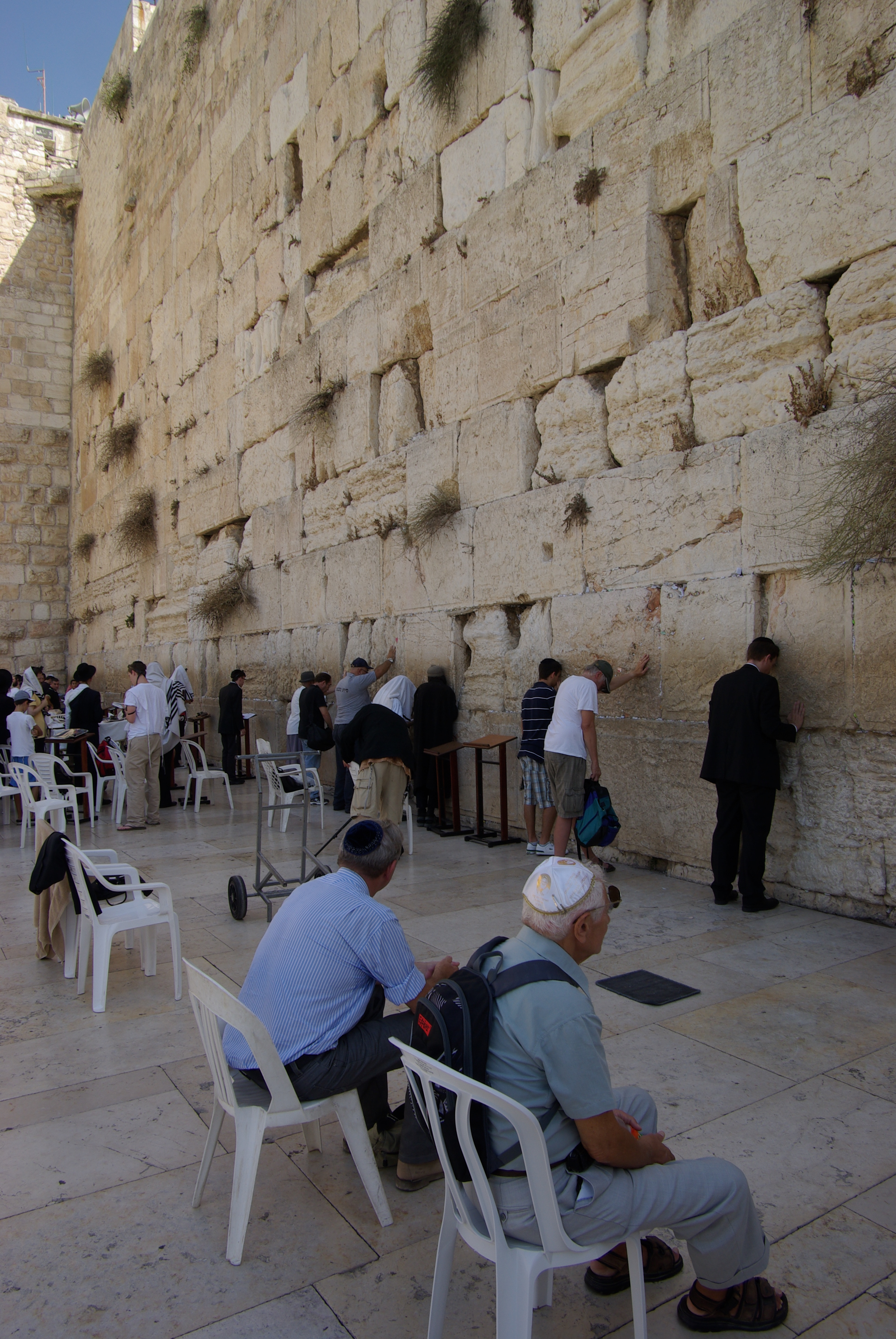
The Western Wall in Jerusalem, 2010

Immigration of Holocaust survivors and Jewish refugees from Arab lands doubled Israel's population within one year of its independence. Over the following years approximately 850,000 Sephardi and Mizrahi Jews fled or were expelled from surrounding mostly due persecution in Arab countries, and in smaller numbers from Turkey, India, Afghanistan, and Iran. Of these, about 680,000 settled in Israel.

Israel's Jewish population continued to grow at a very high rate for years, fed by waves of Jewish immigration from round the world, most notably the massive immigration wave of Soviet Jews, which arrived in Israel in the early 1990s following the dissolution of the USSR, who, according to the Law of Return, were entitled to become Israeli citizens upon arrival. About 380,000 arrived in 1990–1991 alone. Some 80,000–100,000 Ethiopian Jews have immigrated to Israel since the early 1980s.

Since 1948, Israel has been involved in a series of major military conflicts, including the 1956 Suez War, 1967 Six-Day War, 1973 Yom Kippur War, 1982 Lebanon War, and 2006 Lebanon War, as well as a nearly constant series of ongoing minor conflicts. Israel has been also embroiled in an ongoing conflict with the Palestinians in the Israeli-occupied territories, which have been under Israeli control since the Six-Day War, despite the signing of the Oslo Accords on 13 September 1993, and the ongoing efforts of Israeli, Palestinian and global peacemakers.

== Population ==
Jews in Israel population pyramid in 2021

According to Israel's Central Bureau of Statistics, as of January 1, 2020, of Israel's 9.136 million people, 74.1% were Jews of any background. Among them, 68% were Sabras (Israeli-born), mostly second- or third-generation Israelis, and the rest are olim (Jewish immigrants to Israel)—22% from Europe and the Americas, and 10% from Asia and Africa, including the Arab countries. Nearly half of all Israeli Jews are descended from Jews who made aliyah from Europe, while around the same number are descended from Jews who made aliyah from Arab countries, Iran, Turkey, and Central Asia. Over two hundred thousand are, or are descended from, Ethiopian and Indian Jews.

=== Growth ===
Israel is the only country in the world with a consistently growing Jewish population due to natural population increase. Jewish communities in the Diaspora feature a population declining or steady, with the exception of the Orthodox and Haredi Jewish communities around the world, whose members often shun birth control for religious reasons, who have experienced rapid population growth. The growth of the Orthodox and Haredi sector has partly balanced out negative population growth amongst other Jewish denominations. Haredi women have 7.7 children on average while the average Israeli Jewish woman has over 3 children.

When Israel was first established in 1948, it had the third-largest Jewish population in the world, after the United States and Soviet Union. In the 1970s, Israel surpassed the Soviet Union as having the second-largest Jewish population. In 2003, the Israeli Central Bureau of Statistics reported that Israel had surpassed the United States as the nation with the world's largest Jewish population. The report was contested by Professor Sergio Della Pergola of the Hebrew University of Jerusalem. Considered the greatest demographic expert on Jews, Della Pergola said it would take another three years to close the gap. In January 2006, Della Pergola stated that Israel now had more Jews than the United States, and Tel Aviv had replaced New York as the metropolitan area with the largest Jewish population in the world, while a major demographic study found that Israel's Jewish population surpassed that of the United States in 2008. Due to the decline of Diaspora Jewry as a result of intermarriage and assimilation, along with the steady growth of the Israeli Jewish population, it has been projected by the Pew Research Center that by the mid 2050s a majority of the world's Jews will live in Israel. In March 2012, the Israeli Census Bureau of Statistics reported on behalf of Ynet has forecast that in 2019, Israel will be home to 6,940,000 Jews, 5.84 million which are non-Haredi Jews living in Israel, compared with 5.27 million in 2009. The number is expected to grow to anywhere between 6.09 million and 9.95 million by 2059, marking a 16%–89% increase with the 2011 population. The Bureau also forecasts that the ultra-Orthodox population will number 1.1 million people by 2019, compared with 750,000 in 2009. By 2059, the projected Haredi Jewish population is estimated to be between 2.73 million and 5.84 million, marking a 264%–686% increase. Thus the total projected Israeli Jewish population by 2059 is estimated to be between 8.82 million and 15.790 million. In January 2014, it was reported by demographer Joseph Chamie that the projected population of Israeli Jews is expected to reach between 9.84 million by the year 2025 and 11.40 million by 2035.

1st century estimate	2,500,000
7th century estimate	300,000–400,000
1800 estimate	6,700
1880 estimate	24,000
1915 estimate	87,500
1931 estimate	174,000
1936 estimate	> 400,000
1947 estimate	630,000
1949 census	1,013,900
1953 census	1,483,600
1957 census	1,762,700
1962 census	2,068,900
1967 census	2,383,600
1973 census	2,845,000
1983 census	3,412,500
1990 census	3,946,700
1995 census	4,522,300
2000 census	4,955,400
2006 census	5,393,400
2009 census	5,665,100
2010 census	5,802,000
2017 census	6,556,000

=== Significant Jewish population centers ===
Israeli Jews by District
Rank	District	Total Jewish Population (2008)	% Jews (2008)
1	Central District	1,592,000	92%
2	Tel Aviv District	1,210,000	99%
3	Southern District	860,000	86%
4	Haifa District	652,000	76%
5	Jerusalem District	621,000	69%
6	Northern District	562,000	46%
7	Judea and Samaria Area (the West Bank excluding East Jerusalem)	304,569	≈15–20%

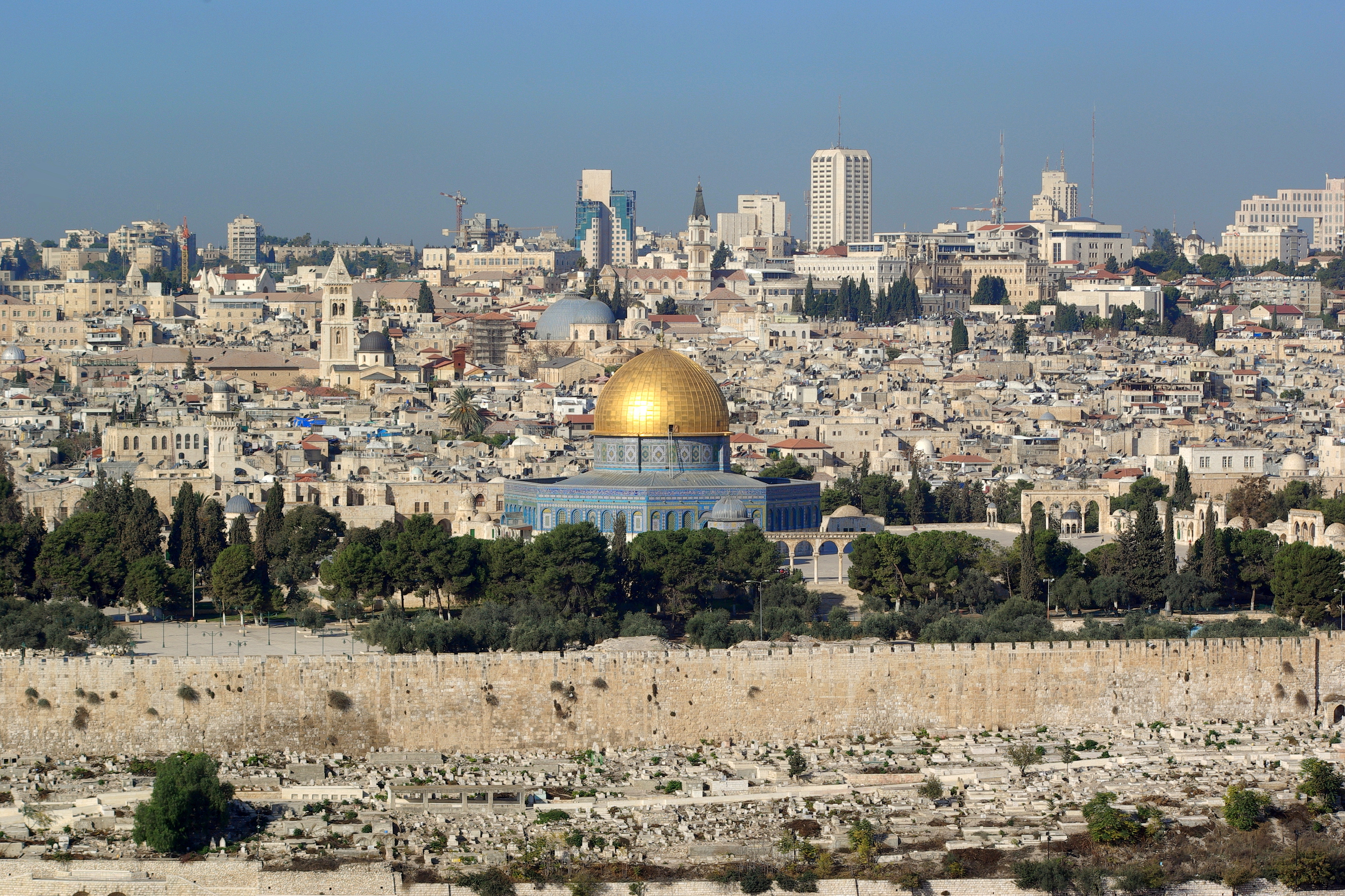
Jerusalem is the largest Jewish city in Israel, Israeli sovereignty in the eastern part of the city is not widely recognized internationally.

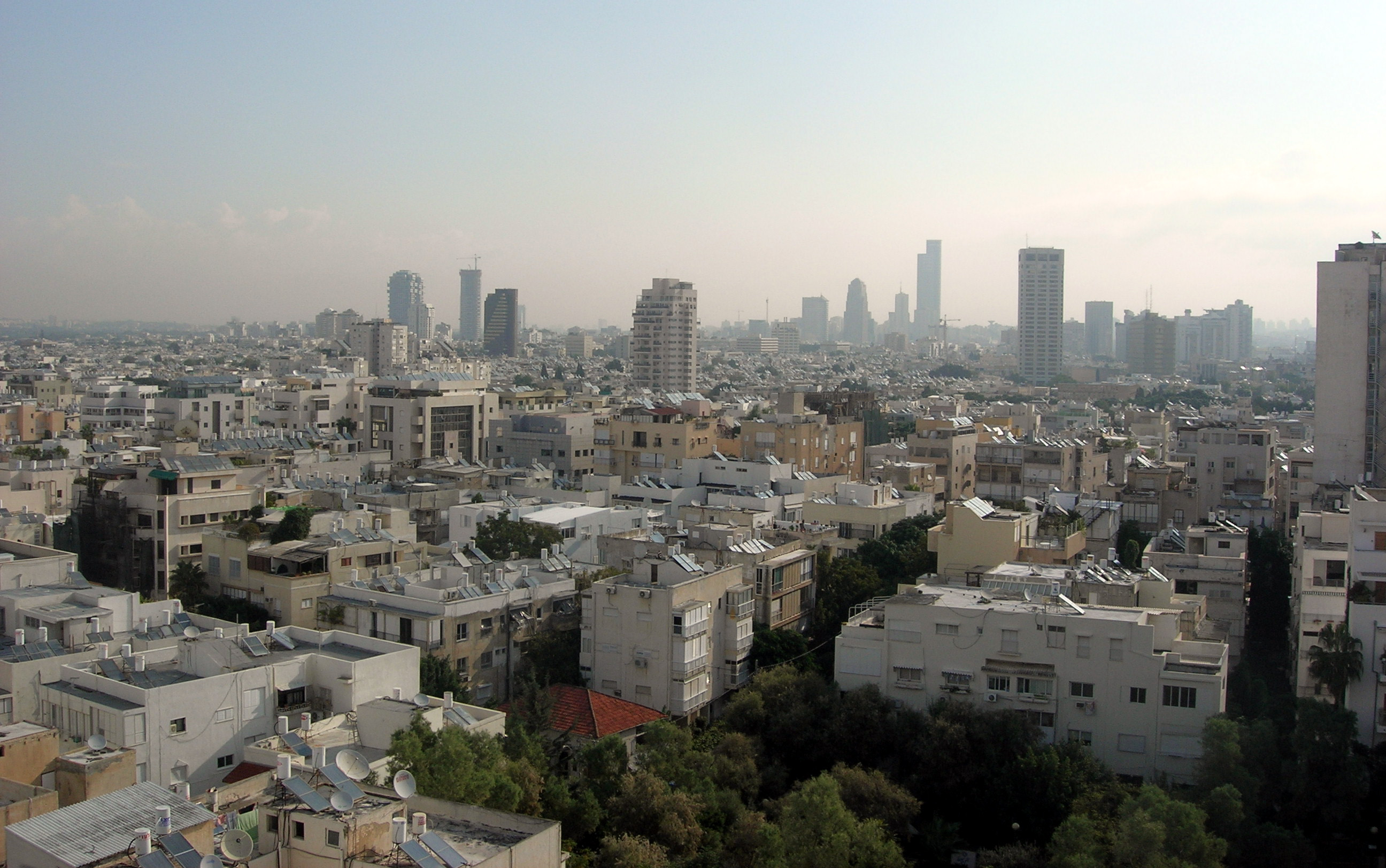
Tel Aviv is the second largest Jewish city in Israel and the centre of the largest Jewish metropolitan area in Israel and in the world.

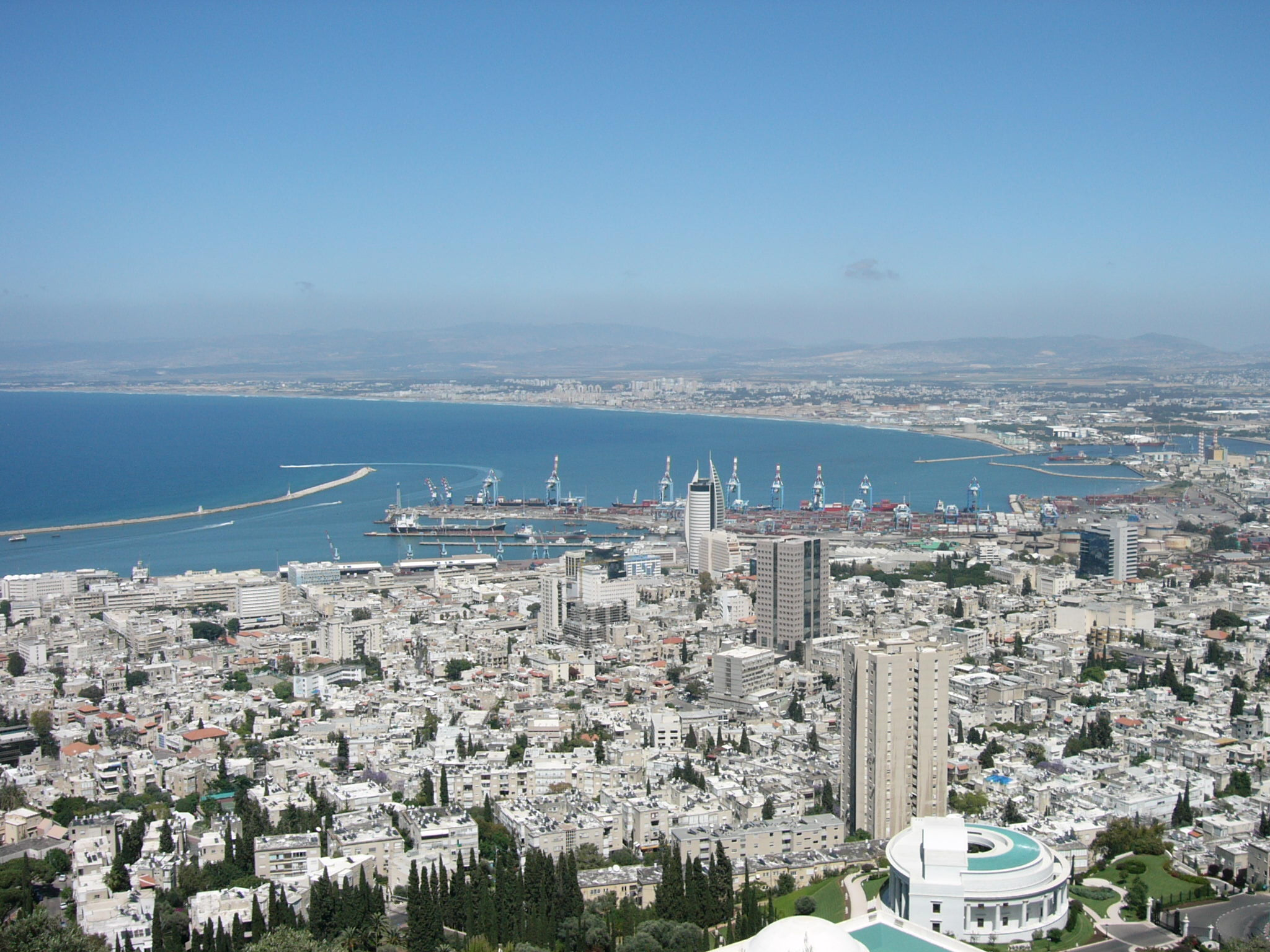
Haifa is the third largest Jewish city in Israel and the centre of the second largest Jewish metropolitan area in Israel.

Significant population centers
Rank	City	Population (2009)	% Jews (2008)	District
1	Jerusalem	773,800	63.4%	Jerusalem District
2	Tel Aviv	393,900	91.4%	Tel Aviv District
3	Haifa	265,600	80.9%	Haifa District
4	Rishon Lezion	227,600	93.9%	Central District
5	Ashdod	211,300	91.0%	Southern District
6	Petah Tikva	197,800	92.5%	Central District
7	Netanya	181,200	93.4%	Central District
8	Beersheba	187,900	87.9%	Southern District
9	Holon	172,400	92.8%	Tel Aviv District
10	Bnei Brak	155,600	98.6%	Tel Aviv District
11	Ramat Gan	135,300	95.2%	Tel Aviv District
12	Bat Yam	128,900	84.9%	Tel Aviv District
13	Rehovot	109,500	94.8%	Central District
14	Ashkelon	111,700	88.4%	Southern District
15	Herzliya	85,300	96.3%	Tel Aviv District

For statistical purposes, there are three main metropolitan areas in Israel. The majority of the Jewish population in Israel is located in the central area of Israel within the Metropolitan area of Tel Aviv. The Metropolitan area of Tel Aviv is currently the largest Jewish population center in the world.

Israeli Jewish population per metropolitan area
Rank	Metropolitan area	Total population (2009)	Jewish population (2009)	% Jews (2009)
1	Metropolitan area of Tel Aviv	3,206,400	3,043,500	94.9%
2	Metropolitan area of Haifa	1,021,000	719,500	70.5%
3	Metropolitan area of Beersheba	559,700	356,000	63.6%

It has been argued that Jerusalem, Israel's proclaimed capital and largest city with a population of 732,100, and an urban area with a population of over 1,000,000 (including 280,000 Palestinian East Jerusalemites who are not Israeli citizens), with over 700,000 Israeli Jews and Nazareth with a population of 65,500, and an urban area of nearly 200,000 people of which over 110,000 are Israeli Jews should also be classified as metropolitan areas.

=== Jewish communities in Israel ===
By the time the State of Israel was proclaimed, the majority of Jews in the state and the region were Ashkenazi. Following the declaration of the state, a flood of Jewish migrants and refugees entered Israel—both from Europe and America and also from Arab and Muslim countries. Most of the Jewish immigrants in the 1950s and 1960s were Jewish Holocaust survivors, as well as Sephardic Jews and Mizrahi Jews (mostly Moroccan Jews, Algerian Jews, Tunisian Jews, Yemenite Jews, Bukharan Jews, Iranian Jews, Iraqi Jews, Kurdish Jews, and smaller communities, principally from Lebanon, Syria, Libya, Egypt, India, Turkey and Afghanistan). In recent decades other Jewish communities have also immigrated to Israel including Ethiopian Jews, Russian Jews and Bnei Menashe.

Among Israeli Jews, 75% are Sabras (Israeli-born), mostly second- or third-generation Israelis, and the rest are olim (Jewish immigrants to Israel)—19% from Europe, Americas and Oceania, and 9% from Asia and Africa, mostly the Muslim world.

The Israeli government does not trace the diaspora origin of Israeli Jews.

=== Paternal country of diaspora origin ===
The CBS traces the paternal country of diaspora origin of Israeli Jews (including non–Halachically Jewish immigrants who arrived on the Law of Return) as of 2010 is as follows.

Country of origin	Born abroad	Israeli born	Total	%
Total	1,610,900	4,124,400	5,753,300	100.0%
Asia	201,000	494,200	695,200	12.0%
Turkey	25,700	52,500	78,100	1.4%
Iraq	62,600	173,300	235,800	4.1%
Yemen	28,400	111,100	139,500	2.4%
Iran/Afghanistan	49,300	92,300	141,600	2.5%
India/Pakistan	17,600	29,000	46,600	0.8%
Syria/Lebanon	10,700	25,000	35,700	0.6%
Other	6,700	11,300	18,000	0.3%
Africa	315,800	572,100	887,900	15.4%
Morocco	153,600	339,600	493,200	8.6%
Algeria/Tunisia	43,200	91,700	134,900	2.3%
Libya	15,800	53,500	69,400	1.2%
Egypt	18,500	39,000	57,500	1.0%
Ethiopia	81,600	38,600	110,100	1.9%
Other	13,100	9,700	22,800	0.4%
Europe/Americas/Oceania	1,094,100	829,700	1,923,800	33.4%
Soviet Union	651,400	241,000	892,400	15.5%
Poland	51,300	151,000	202,300	3.5%
Romania	88,600	125,900	214,400	3.7%
Bulgaria/Greece	16,400	32,600	49,000	0.9%
Germany/Austria	24,500	50,600	75,200	1.3%
Czech Republic/Slovakia/Hungary	20,000	45,000	64,900	1.1%
France	41,100	26,900	68,000	1.2%
United Kingdom	21,000	19,900	40,800	0.7%
Europe, other	27,000	29,900	56,900	1.0%
North America/Oceania	90,500	63,900	154,400	2.7%
Argentina	35,500	26,100	61,600	1.1%
Latin America, other	26,900	17,000	43,900	0.8%
Israel	—	2,246,300	2,246,300	39.0%

In Israel there are approximately 300,000 citizens with Jewish ancestry who are not Jewish according to Orthodox interpretations of Jewish law. Of this number approximately 10% are Christian and 89% are either Jewish or non-religious. The total number of conversions under the Nativ program of IDF was 640 in 2005 and 450 in 2006. From 2002 to 1 October 2007, a total of 2,213 soldiers have converted under Nativ. In 2003, 437 Christians converted to Judaism; in 2004, 884; and in 2005, 733. Recently several thousand conversions conducted by the Chief Rabbinate under the leadership of Rabbi Chaim Drukman have been annulled, and the official Jewish status over several thousand people who converted through the conversion court of the Chief Rabbinate since 1999 hangs in limbo as the proceedings continue regarding these individuals Jewish status. The vast majority of these individuals are former Soviet Union immigrants.

In his book from 2001 "The Invention and Decline of Israeliness: State, Culture and Military in Israel", the Israeli sociologist Baruch Kimmerling identified and divided the modern Israeli society into seven population groups (seven subcultures): The secular upper-middle class group, the national religious group, the traditionalist Mizrahim group, the Orthodox religious group, the Arab citizens of Israel, the Russian immigrants group and the Ethiopian immigrants group. According to Kimmerling, each of these population groups have distinctive characteristics, such as place of resident, consumption patterns, education systems, communications media and more.

==== Israeli Jews who emigrated from European and American countries ====
Today, Jews whose family emigrated from European countries and the Americas, on their paternal line, constitute the largest single group among Israeli Jews and consist of about 3,000,000 people living in Israel. About 1,200,000 of them are descended from or are immigrants from the former Soviet Union who returned from the diaspora after the fall of the Former Soviet Union 1991 (about 300,000 of them are not considered to be Jewish under Jewish law). Most of the other 1,800,000 are descended from the first Zionist settlers in the Land of Israel, as well as Holocaust survivors and their descendants, with an additional 200,000 having immigrated or descended from immigrants from English-speaking countries and South America. They have played a prominent role in various fields including the arts, entertainment, literature, sports, science and technology, business and economy, media, and politics of Israel since its founding, and tend to be the most affluent of Israeli Jews.

Not all Jews immigrating to Israel from European countries are of Ashkenazi origin (the majority of French Jews are of Sephardic, and some Jews from the Asian Republics of the USSR are Mizrahi), and the Israeli government does not distinguish between Jewish communities in its census.

During the first decades of Israel as a state, strong cultural conflict existed between Mizrahi, Sephardic and Ashkenazi Jews (mainly east European Ashkenazim). The roots of this conflict, which still exists to a much smaller extent in present-day Israeli society, stem from the many cultural differences between the various Jewish communities, despite the government's encouragement of the "melting pot". That is to say, all Jewish immigrants in Israel were strongly encouraged to "melt down" their own particular exile identities within the general social "pot" in order to become Israeli.

The current most prominent European countries of origin of the Israeli Jews are as follows:

- Western Europe
- Former Soviet Union and Russia
- Poland
- Ukraine
- Romania (list)
- United States & Canada
- Germany/Austria
- Latin America (mainly from Argentina)
- Hungary
- Czechoslovakia
- South Africa
- Australia & New Zealand

==== Israeli Jews who emigrated from North African and Asian countries ====
The majority of Israeli Jews are Mizrahi. The exact proportion of Mizrahi and Sephardic Jewish populations in Israel is unknown (since it is not included in the census); some estimates place Jews of Mizrahi origin at up to 61% of the Israeli Jewish population, with hundreds of thousands more having mixed Ashkenazi heritage due to cross-cultural intermarriage. In a survey that attempted to be representative, 44.9% percent of the Israeli Jewish sample identified as either Mizrahi or Sephardi, 44.2% as Ashkenazi or Russian Jews, about 3% as Beta Israel and 7.9% as mixed or other.

Jews from North Africa and Asia have come to be called "Mizrahi Jews".

Most African and Asian Jewish communities use the Sephardic prayer ritual and abide by the rulings of Sephardic rabbinic authorities, and therefore consider themselves to be "Sephardim" in the broader sense of "Jews of the Spanish rite", though not in the narrower sense of "Spanish Jews". Of late, the term Mizrahi has come to be associated with all Jews in Israel with backgrounds in Islamic lands.

Cultural and/or racial biases against the newcomers were compounded by the fledgling state's lack of financial resources and inadequate housing to handle the massive population influx. Austerity was the law of the land during the country's first decade of existence. Thus, hundreds of thousands of new Sephardic immigrants were sent to live in tent cities in outlying areas. Sephardim (in its wider meaning) were often victims of discrimination, and were sometimes called schwartze (meaning "black" in Yiddish). The most egregious effects of racism were documented in the Yemenite children affair, in which Yemenite children were placed in the foster care of Ashkenazim families, their families being told that their children had died.

Some believe that even worse than the housing discrimination was the differential treatment accorded the children of these immigrants, many of whom were tracked by the largely European education establishment into dead-end "vocational" high schools, without any real assessment of their intellectual capacities. Mizrahi Jews protested their unfair treatment, and even established the Israeli Black Panthers movement with the mission of working for social justice.

The effects of this early discrimination still linger a half-century later, as documented by the studies of the Adva Center, a think tank on social equality, and by other Israeli academic research (cf., for example, Tel Aviv University Professor Yehuda Shenhav's article in Hebrew documenting the gross under-representation of Sephardic Jewry in Israeli high school history textbooks.) All Israeli Prime Ministers have been Ashkenazi, although Sephardim and Mizrahim have attained high positions including ministerial positions, chief of staffs and presidency. The student bodies of Israel's universities remain overwhelmingly Ashkenazi in origin, despite the fact that roughly half the country's population is non-Ashkenazi. The tent cities of the 1950s morphed into so-called "development towns". Scattered over border areas of the Negev Desert and the Galilee, far from the bright lights of Israel's major cities, most of these towns never had the critical mass or ingredients to succeed as places to live, and they continue to suffer from high unemployment, inferior schools, and chronic brain drain.

While the Israeli Black Panthers no longer exist, the Mizrahi Democratic Rainbow Coalition and many other NGOs carry on the struggle for equal access and opportunity in housing, education, and employment for the country's underprivileged populace—still largely composed of Sephardim and Mizrahim, joined now by newer immigrants from Ethiopia and the Caucasus Mountains.

Today over 2,500,000 Mizrahi Jews, and Sephardic Jews live in Israel with the majority of them being descendants of the 680,000 Jews who fled Arab countries due to expulsions and antisemitism, with smaller numbers having emigrated from the Islamic Republics of the Former Soviet Union (c.250,000), India (70,000), Iran (200,000–250,000), and Turkey (80,000). Before the immigration of over 1,000,000 Russian, mainly Ashkenazi Jews to Israel after to collapse of the Soviet Union, 70% of Israeli Jews were Sephardic or Mizrahi Jews.

The current most prominent countries of diaspora origin of these Jewish communities are as follows:

- Western Europe, predominantly France
- Arab World
- Philippines
- Thailand
- Burma
- China/Hong Kong/Taiwan
- Japan
- Morocco
- Iraq
- Yemen
- Iran/Afghanistan
- Algeria/Tunisia
- Azerbaijan/Armenia/Georgia/Southern Russia
- Bulgaria/Greece
- Turkey
- Libya
- Egypt
- Central Asia
- Syria
- Lebanon
- India/Pakistan/Sri Lanka/Bangladesh
- Latin America
- South Korea
- Indonesia
- Malaysia
- Singapore
- Mongolia
- Tajikistan/Uzbekistan/Turkmenistan/Kyrgyzstan/Kazakhstan

==== Italian rite and Romaniote Jews ====
Israel also has small populations of Italian (rite) Jews from Italy and Romaniote Jews from Greece, Cyprus and Turkey. Both groups are considered distinct from the Sephardim and the Ashkenazim. Jews from both communities made aliyah in relatively large numbers during the 20th century, especially after the Holocaust. Both came in relatively small numbers as compared to other Jewish groups. Despite their small numbers, the Italian have been prominent in the economy and academia. Most Italian and Romaniote Israelis and their descendants live in the Tel Aviv area.

==== Argentine Jews ====
Argentines in Israel are the largest immigrant group from Latin America and one of the fastest growing groups. The vast majority of Argentines in Israel are Jewish Argentines who make Aliyah but there is also an important group of non-Jewish Argentines, having, or being married to somebody who has, at least one Jewish grandparent, who choose Israel as their new home. There are about 50,000 Argentines residing in Israel although some estimates put the figure at 70,000.

Most Jewish Argentines are Ashkenazi Jews.

==== Ethiopian Beta Israel ====
Nearly all of the Ethiopian Beta Israel community today lives in Israel, comprising more than 121,000 people. Most of this population are the descendants and the immigrants who immigrated to Israel during two massive waves of immigration mounted by the Israeli government—"Operation Moses" (1984) and during "Operation Solomon" (1991). Civil war and famine in Ethiopia prompted the Israeli government to mount these dramatic rescue operations. The rescues were within the context of Israel's national mission to gather Diaspora Jews and bring them to the Jewish homeland. Some immigration has continued up until the present day. Today 81,000 Ethiopian Israelis were born in Ethiopia, while 38,500 or 32% of the community are native born Israelis.

Over time, the Ethiopian Jews in Israel moved out of the government-owned mobile home camps that they initially lived in and settled mainly in the various cities and towns throughout Israel, mainly with the encouragement of the Israeli authorities who granted the new immigrants generous government loans or low-interest mortgages.

Similarly to other groups of immigrant Jews who made aliyah to Israel, the Ethiopian Jews have faced obstacles in their integration to Israeli society. Initially the main challenges of the Ethiopian Jewish community in Israel were due in part to communication difficulties (most of the population could not read or write in Hebrew, and much of the veteran population could not hold a simple conversation in the Hebrew language), and discrimination in certain areas of the Israeli society. Unlike Russian immigrants, many of whom arrive with job skills, Ethiopians came from a subsistence economy and were ill-prepared to work in an industrialized society.

Over the years there has been significant progress in the integration of this population group in the Israeli society, primarily due to the fact that most of the young Ethiopian population is conscripted into the military service (mandatory for all Israelis at 18), where most Ethiopian Jews have been able to increase their chances for better opportunities.

The 2013 Miss Israel title was given to Yityish Titi Aynaw, the first Ethiopian-born contestant to win the pageant. Aynaw, moved to Israel from Ethiopia with her family when she was 12.

==== Descendants of mixed-marriages ====
Intermarriage between Ashkenazi Jews and Sephardi/Mizrahi Jews in Israel was initially uncommon, due in part to distances of each group's settlement in Israel, economic gaps, and cultural and/or racial biases. In recent generations, however, the barriers were lowered by state-sponsored assimilation of all the Jewish communities into a common Sabra (native-born Israeli) identity, which facilitated extensive "mixed marriages". The percentage of Jewish children born to mixed marriages between Ashkenazi Jews and Sephardi/Mizrahi Jews rose steadily. A 1995 survey found that 5.3% of Jews aged 40–43, 16.5% of Jews aged 20–21, and 25% of Jews aged 10–11 were of mixed ancestry. That same year, 25% of Jewish children born in Israel were mixed.

==== Converts to Judaism ====
- Since the founding of the state of Israel and until today, thousands of converts to Judaism worldwide have immigrated to Israel. The most prominent groups of converts are:
  - Bnei Menashe—As of 2015, over 3,000 Bnei Menashe converts to Judaism have immigrated to Israel since the 1980s. The Bnei Menashe group originates from India's North-Eastern border states of Manipur and Mizoram who claim descent from one of the Lost Tribes of Israel. They live mainly in West Bank settlements, the southern Israeli town of Nitzan and in the Galilee. The majority of Bnei Menashe are Orthodox Jews. About 7,000 members of this group remain in India, many hoping to make Aliyah.
  - B'nai Moshe— A few 100 Peruvian Amerindian converts to Judaism have immigrated to Israel since the early 1990s. The majority of these 'Inca Jews' follow Orthodox Judaism and live in Jewish West Bank settlements.

=== Assimilation and population changes ===
Even though the assimilation rate among the Israeli Jewish community has always been low, the propriety and degree of assimilation of Israeli Jews and Jews worldwide has always been a significant and controversial issue within the modern Israeli Jewish community, with both political and religious skeptics.

While not all Jews disapprove of intermarriage, many members of the Israeli Jewish community have expressed their concern that a high rate of interfaith marriages will result in the eventual disappearance of the Israeli Jewish community.

In contrast to the current moderate birth rates of Israeli Jews and the relative low trends of assimilation, some communities within Israeli Jewry, such as Orthodox Jews, have significantly higher birth rates and lower intermarriage rates, and are growing rapidly.

=== Israeli Jewish diaspora ===
Since the establishment of the State of Israel in 1948 the term "Yerida" has been used to mark the emigration of Jews from Israel, whether in groups (small or large) or individually. The name is used in a pejorative sense, as "yerida" means "going down", while "aliyah", immigration to Israel, means "going up".

Through the years, the majority of Israeli Jews who emigrated from Israel went to the United States and Canada.

For many years definitive data on Israeli emigration was unavailable. In The Israeli Diaspora sociologist Stephen J. Gold maintains that calculation of Jewish emigration has been a contentious issue, explaining, "Since Zionism, the philosophy that underlies the existence of the Jewish state, calls for return home of the world's Jews, the opposite movement—Israelis leaving the Jewish state to reside elsewhere—clearly presents an ideological and demographic problem."

Among the most common reasons for emigration of Israeli Jews from Israel are economic constraints, economic characteristics (U.S. and Canada have always been richer nations than Israel), disappointment of the Israeli government, Israel's ongoing security issues, as well as the excessive role of religion in the lives of Israelis.

In recent decades, considerable numbers of Israeli Jews have moved abroad. Reasons for emigration vary, but generally relate to a combination of economic and political concerns. According to data published in 2006, from 1990 to 2005, 230,000 Israelis left the country; a large proportion of these departures included people who initially immigrated to Israel and then reversed their course (48% of all post-1990 departures and even 60% of 2003 and 2004 departures were former immigrants to Israel). 8% of Jewish immigrants in the post-1990 period left Israel. In 2005 alone, 21,500 Israelis left the country and had not yet returned at the end of 2006; among them 73% were Jews. At the same time, 10,500 Israelis came back to Israel after over one year abroad; 84% of them were Jews.

In addition, the Israeli Jewish diaspora group also has many Jews worldwide, especially the ones who originate from Western countries, who moved to Israel and gained Israeli citizenship under the Law of Return, who lived in Israel for a time, then returned to their country of origin and kept their dual citizenship.

==== United States ====
Many Israeli Jews emigrated to the United States throughout the period of the declaration of the state of Israel and until today. Today, the descendants of these people are known as Israeli-Americans. The 2000 Census counted 106,839 Israeli Americans. It is estimated that 400,000–800,000 Israeli Jews have immigrated to the United States since the 1950s, though this number remains a contested figure, since many Israelis are originally from other countries and may list their origin countries when arriving in the United States.

==== Russia ====
Moscow has the largest single Israeli expatriate community in the world, with 80,000 Israeli citizens living in the city as of 2014, almost all of them native Russian-speakers. Many Israeli cultural events are hosted for the community, and many live part of the year in Israel. (To cater to the Israeli community, Israeli cultural centres are located in Moscow, Saint Petersburg, Novosibirsk and Yekaterinburg.)

==== Canada ====
Many Israeli Jews emigrated to Canada throughout the period of the declaration of the state of Israel and until today. Today, the descendants of these people are known as Israeli Canadians. It is estimated that as many as 30,000 Jewish Israelis live in Canada.

==== United Kingdom ====
Many Israeli Jews emigrated to the United Kingdom throughout the period of the declaration of the state of Israel and until today. Today, the descendants of these people are known as Israeli-British. It is estimated that as many as 30,000 Jewish Israelis live in the United Kingdom.

The majority of the Israeli Jews in the UK live in London and in particular in the heavily populated Jewish area of Golders Green.

=== Perceived Arab demographic threat ===
Comparison of the changes in percentages of the main religious group in Israel between 1949 and 2020: Jewish Muslim Christians Druze Other

In the northern part of Israel the percentage of Jewish population is declining. The increasing population of Arabs within Israel, and the majority status they hold in two major geographic regions—the Galilee and the Triangle—has become a growing point of open political contention in recent years.

The phrase demographic threat (or demographic bomb) is used within the Israeli political sphere to describe the growth of Israel's Arab citizenry as constituting a threat to its maintenance of its status as a Jewish state with a Jewish demographic majority.

Israeli historian Benny Morris states:

The Israeli Arabs are a time bomb. Their slide into complete Palestinization has made them an emissary of the enemy that is among us. They are a potential fifth column. In both demographic and security terms they are liable to undermine the state. So that if Israel again finds itself in a situation of existential threat, as in 1948, it may be forced to act as it did then. If we are attacked by Egypt (after an Islamist revolution in Cairo) and by Syria, and chemical and biological missiles slam into our cities, and at the same time Israeli Palestinians attack us from behind, I can see an expulsion situation. It could happen. If the threat to Israel is existential, expulsion will be justified[...]

The term "demographic bomb" was famously used by Benjamin Netanyahu in 2003 when he asserted that if the percentage of Arab citizens rises above its current level of about 20 percent, Israel will not be able to maintain a Jewish demographic majority. Netanyahu's comments were criticized as racist by Arab Knesset members and a range of civil rights and human rights organizations, such as the Association for Civil Rights in Israel. Even earlier allusions to the "demographic threat" can be found in an internal Israeli government document drafted in 1976 known as the Koenig Memorandum, which laid out a plan for reducing the number and influence of Arab citizens of Israel in the Galilee region.

In 2003, the Israeli daily Ma'ariv published an article entitled, "Special Report: Polygamy is a Security Threat," detailing a report put forth by the Director of the Israeli Population Administration at the time, Herzl Gedj; the report described polygamy in the Bedouin sector a "security threat" and advocated means of reducing the birth rate in the Arab sector. The Population Administration is a department of the Demographic Council, whose purpose, according to the Israeli Central Bureau of Statistics is: "to increase the Jewish birthrate by encouraging women to have more children using government grants, housing benefits, and other incentives." In 2008 the Minister of the Interior appointed Yaakov Ganot as new head of the Population Administration, which according to Haaretz is "probably the most important appointment an interior minister can make."

The rapid population growth with the Haredi sector may affect, according to some Israeli researchers, the preservation of a Jewish majority in the state of Israel. Preserving a Jewish majority population within the state of Israel has been a defining principle among Israeli Jews, where Jewish couples are encouraged to have large families. Many financial incentives were given on behalf of the Israeli government. For instance, Israel's first Prime Minister David Ben-Gurion set up a monetary fund for Jewish women who gave birth to at least 10 children. To further increase the Israeli Jewish fertility rate and population, many fertility clinics have been opened and are operated throughout the country. As part of Israel's universal health-care coverage, Israel spends $60 million annually on publicly funded fertility treatments and operates more fertility clinics per capita than any other country in the world.

A study showed that in 2010, Jewish birthrates rose by 31% and 19,000 diaspora Jews immigrated to Israel, while the Arab birthrate fell by 1.7%. By June 2013, a number of Israeli demographers called the so-called Arab demographic time bomb a myth, citing a declining Arab and Muslim birth rate, an incremental increase in the Israeli Jewish birth rate, unnecessary demographic scare campaigns, as well as inflated statistics released by the Palestinian Authority.

Israeli former Ambassador Yoram Ettinger has rejected the assertion of a demographic time bomb, saying that anyone who believes such claims are either misled or mistaken.

American political scientist Ian Lustick has accused Ettinger and his associates for multiple methodological errors and having a political agenda.

== Jewish Israeli culture ==
=== Religion ===
Jewishness is widely considered by Israeli Jews as a national, ethnic and religious identity (See Ethnoreligious group).

==== Religious beliefs ====
Secular-religious spectrum of Israeli Jews, 2007
Secular (hiloni)	67%
Religious (dati)	15%
Ultra-Orthodox (haredi)	15%

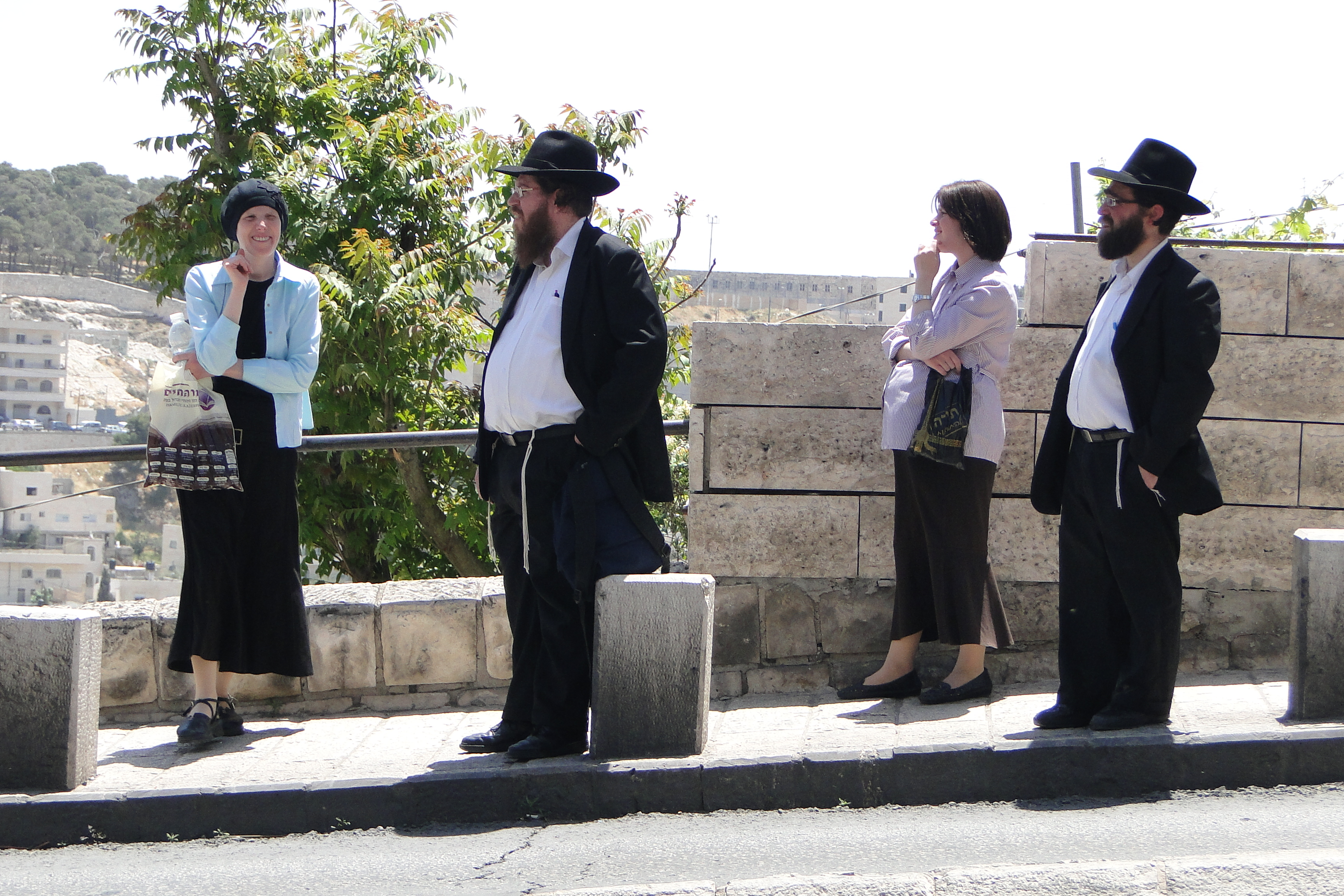
Two Haredi Jewish couples at a bus stop in Jerusalem

Commonly, the Israeli Jews are identified as haredim (ultra-Orthodox), datim (Orthodox), masortim (traditionalists), and hiloni (secular).

In 2011, roughly 9% of Israeli Jews defined as Haredim (ultra-orthodox religious); an additional 10% are "religious"; 15% consider themselves "religious traditionalists", not strictly adhering to religion; further 23% are self-defined "'not very religious' traditionalists" and 43% are "secular" ("hiloni").

A 2025 Pew Research Center survey on religious switching among Israeli Jews revealed that 22% transitioned between different Jewish groups. The study found that 45% of Israeli Jews identify as hilonim (secular), though only 38% were raised as such. Among masortim (traditionalists), the figures were 24% and 25%, respectively, while datim (Orthodox) accounted for 18% compared to 23% in their upbringing. Meanwhile, haredim (ultra-Orthodox) comprised 13%, slightly higher than the 12% raised in that tradition. This data highlights a notable shift: hilonim experienced the most significant net gain (+7%), whereas datim faced the steepest decline (-5%). The other groups saw minor changes, with masortim decreasing by 1% and haredim increasing by 1%.

In 2020, the ultra-Orthodox Israelis are already numbered more than 1.1 million (14 percent of total population).

However, 78% of all Israelis (virtually all Israeli Jews) participate in a Passover seder, and 63% fast on Yom Kippur.

Some who consider themselves ethnically Jewish follow other religions such as Christianity or Messianic Judaism.

==== Observances and engagement ====
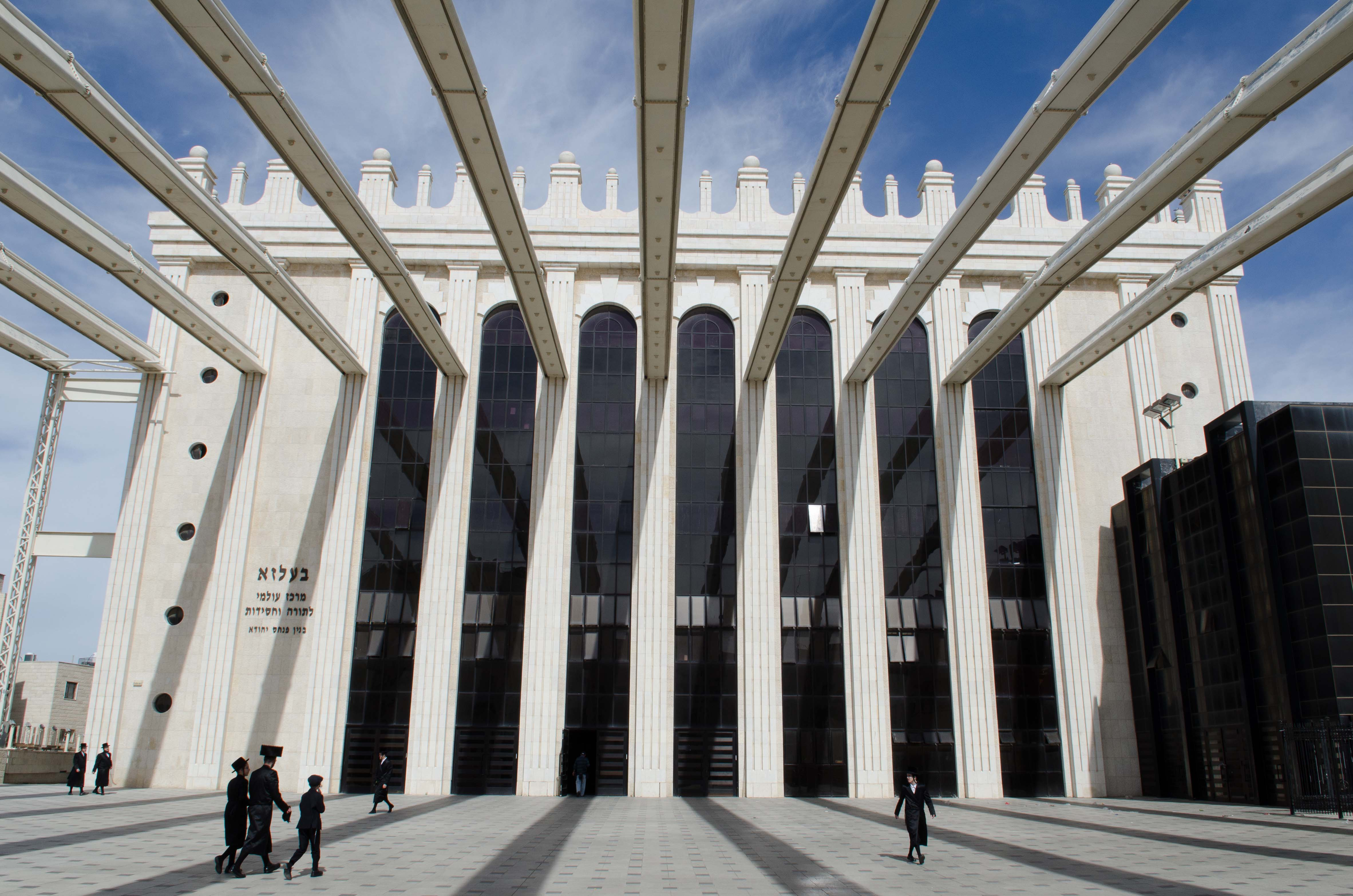
Hasids at front of Belz Great Synagogue, Jerusalem

Jewish religious practice in Israel is quite varied. Among the 4.3 million American Jews described as "strongly connected" to Judaism, over 80% report some sort of active engagement with Judaism, ranging from attendance at daily prayer services on one end of the spectrum to as little as attendance to Passover Seders or lighting Hanukkah candles on the other.

Unlike North American Jews, according to the 2013 Israel Democracy Institute's data, the majority of Israeli Jews tend not to align themselves with Jewish religious movements (such as Orthodox, Reform or Conservative Judaism, although they also exist in Israel, like in the West) but instead tend to define their religious affiliation by degree of their religious practice.

==== Baalei teshuva and Yotz'im bish'ela ====
Another characteristic of the Jewish community in Israel is the relatively high dynamism in which the Israeli Jews tend to define their religious status. Among the secular and traditionalist groups some individuals choose to embrace Orthodox Judaism. In 2009 around 200,000 Israeli Jews aged 20 and above defined themselves as "Baalei teshuva" (בעלי תשובה), Nevertheless, in practice about a quarter of them have a traditionalist lifestyle. Various Orthodox organizations operate in Israel with the aim of getting non-Orthodox Jews embrace Orthodox Judaism. Notable examples are the Chasidic movements Chabad and Breslov which have gained much popularity among the Baalei teshuva, the organizations Arachim and Yad LeAchim who initiate seminars in Judaism, and the organization Aish HaTorah.

On the other hand, among the religious and Orthodox groups in Israel, many individuals chose to part from the religious lifestyle and embrace a secular lifestyle (they are referred to as Yotz'im bish'ela). A research conducted in 2011 estimated that about 30 percent of the national religious youth from the religious lifestyle embrace a secular lifestyle, but 75 percent of them go back to religion after a formation process of their self-identity, which usually lasts until age 28. The percentage from those who grew up in Chassidic homes, is even higher than that. Contrary to Baalei teshuva, the Orthodox Jews whom wish to embrace a secular lifestyle have very few organizations whom assist them in parting from the Haredi world, and often they end up finding themselves destitute or struggling to complete the educational and social gaps. The most prominent organizations whom assist Yotz'im bish'ela are the NGO organizations Hillel and Dror.

=== Education ===
Education is a core value in Jewish culture and in Israeli society at large with many Israeli parents sacrificing their own personal comforts and financial resources to provide their children with the highest standards of education possible. Much of the Israeli Jewish population seek education as a passport to a decent job and a middle class paycheck in the country's competitive high-tech economy. Jewish parents especially mothers take great responsibility to inculcate the value of education in their children at a young age. Striving for high academic achievement and educational success is stressed in many modern Jewish Israeli households as parents make sure that their children are well educated adequately in order to gain the necessary technological skills needed for employment success to compete in Israel's modern high-tech job market. Israelis see competency with in demand job skills such as literacy in math and science as especially necessary for employment success in Israel's competitive 21st-century high-tech economy. Israel's Jewish population maintains a relatively high level of educational attainment where just under half of all Israeli Jews (46%) hold post-secondary degrees. This figure has remained stable in their already high levels of educational attainment over recent generations. Israeli Jews (among those ages 25 and older) have an average of 11.6 years of schooling making them one of the most highly educated of all major religious groups in the world. The Israeli government regulates and finances most of the schools operating in the country, including the majority of those run by private organizations. The national school system has two major branches—a Hebrew-speaking branch and an Arabic-speaking branch. The core curricula for the two systems are almost identical in mathematics, sciences, and English. It is different in humanities (history, literature, etc.). While Hebrew is taught as a second language in Arab schools since the third grade and obligatory for Arabic-speaking schools' matriculation exams, only basic knowledge of Arabic is taught in Hebrew-speaking schools, usually from the 7th to the 9th grade. Arabic is not obligatory for Hebrew-speaking schools' matriculation exams.

=== Language ===
The movement for the revival of Hebrew as a spoken language was particularly popular among new Jewish Zionist immigrants who came to Palestine since the 1880s. Eliezer Ben-Yehuda (born in the Russian Empire) and his followers created the first Hebrew-speaking schools, newspapers, and other Hebrew-language institutions. After his immigration to Israel, and due to the impetus of the Second Aliyah (1905–1914), Hebrew prevailed as the single official and spoken language of the Jewish community of mandatory Palestine. When the State of Israel was formed in 1948, the government viewed Hebrew as the de facto official language and initiated a melting pot policy, where every immigrant was required to study Hebrew and often to adopt a Hebrew surname. Use of Yiddish, which was the main competitor prior to World War II, was discouraged, and the number of Yiddish speakers declined as the older generations died out, though Yiddish is still commonly used in Ashkenazi haredi communities.

Modern Hebrew is also the primary official language of the modern State of Israel and almost all Israeli Jews are native Hebrew-speakers and speak Hebrew as their primary language. A variety of other languages are still spoken within some Israeli Jewish communities, communities that are representative of the various Jewish ethnic divisions from around the world that have come together to make up Israel's Jewish population.

Even though the majority of Israeli Jews are native Hebrew speakers, many Jewish immigrants still continue to speak their former languages—many immigrants from the Soviet Union continue to speak primarily Russian at home and many immigrants from Ethiopia continue to speak primarily Amharic at home.

Many of Israel's Hasidic Jews (being exclusively of Ashkenazi descent) are raised speaking Yiddish.

Classical Hebrew is the language of most Jewish religious literature, such as the Tanakh (Bible) and Siddur (prayerbook).

Currently, 90% of the Israeli-Jewish public is proficient in Hebrew, and 70% is highly proficient.

Some prominent Israeli politicians such as David Ben-Gurion tried to learn Arabic, and the Mizrahi Jews spoke Judeo-Arabic although most of their descendants in Israel today only speak Hebrew.

== Legal and political status in Israel ==
Israel was established as a homeland for the Jewish people and is often referred to as the Jewish state. Israel's Declaration of Independence specifically called for the establishment of a Jewish state with equality of social and political rights, irrespective of religion, race, or sex. The notion that Israel should be constituted in the name of and maintain a special relationship with a particular group of people, the Jewish people, has drawn much controversy vis-à-vis minority groups living in Israel—the large number of Muslim and Christian Palestinians residing in Israel. Nevertheless, through the years many Israeli Jewish nationalists have based the legitimacy of Israel being a Jewish state on the Balfour Declaration and ancient historical ties to the land, asserting that both play particular roles as evidence under international law, as well as a fear that a hostile Arab world might be disrespectful of a Jewish minority—alleging a variety of possible harms up to and including genocide—were Israel to become a post-national "state for all its citizens".

Through the years, as Israel's continued existence as a "Jewish State" has relied upon the maintenance of a Jewish demographic majority, Israeli demographers, politicians and bureaucrats have treated Jewish population growth promotion as a central question in their research and policymaking.

=== Law of Return ===
The Law of Return is an Israeli legislation that grants all Jews and those of Jewish lineage the right to gain an Israeli citizenship and to settle in Israel. It was enacted by the Knesset, Israel's Parliament, on 5 July 1950, and the related Law of Citizenship in 1952. These two pieces of legislation contain expressions pertaining to religion, history and nationalism, as well as to democracy, in a combination unique to Israel. Together, they grant preferential treatment to Jews returning to their ancestral homeland.

The Law of Return declares that Israel constitutes a home not only for the inhabitants of the State, but also for all members of the Jewish people everywhere, be they living in poverty and fear of persecution or be they living in affluence and safety. The law declares to the Jewish people and to the world that the State of Israel welcomes the Jews of the world to return to their ancient homeland.

=== Israeli laws governing marriage and divorce of Jews ===
Currently, all the marriages and divorces in Israel (as well as within the Jewish community) are recognized by the Israeli Interior Ministry only if performed under an official recognized religious authority and only between a man and a woman of the same religion. The Jewish marriage and divorce in Israel are under the jurisdiction of the Chief Rabbinate of Israel, which defines a person's Jewish status strictly according to halakha.

Civil marriages are only officially sanctioned if performed abroad. As a result, it is not uncommon for couples who may for some reason not be able (or chose not) to get married in Israel to travel overseas to get married.

During its time of existence the legal settlement that gives the rabbinical courts the monopoly on conducting the marriages and divorces of the entire Israeli Jewish population has been a source of great criticism from the secular public in Israel, but also to the ardent support from the religious public. The main argument of the supporters of the law is that its cancellation will divide the Jewish people in Israel between the Jews who would marry and divorce each other within the Jewish religious authorities and the Jews who would marry and divorce each other within the civil marriages—which would not be registered or inspected by the religious authorities, and thus their children would be considered illegitimate to marry the children of the couples married within the religious court, from fear of them being considered Mamzer. Opponents of the law see it as a severe offense to the human civil rights made by the state of Israel.

However, common-law marriage is recognized by Israeli law, without restriction of ethnicity, religion or sex (that is, both for inter-sex and same-sex couples, and between a Jew and a non-Jew). Once, the status of common law marriage is proven and obtained, it gives a legal status almost equal to marriage.

=== Military conscription ===
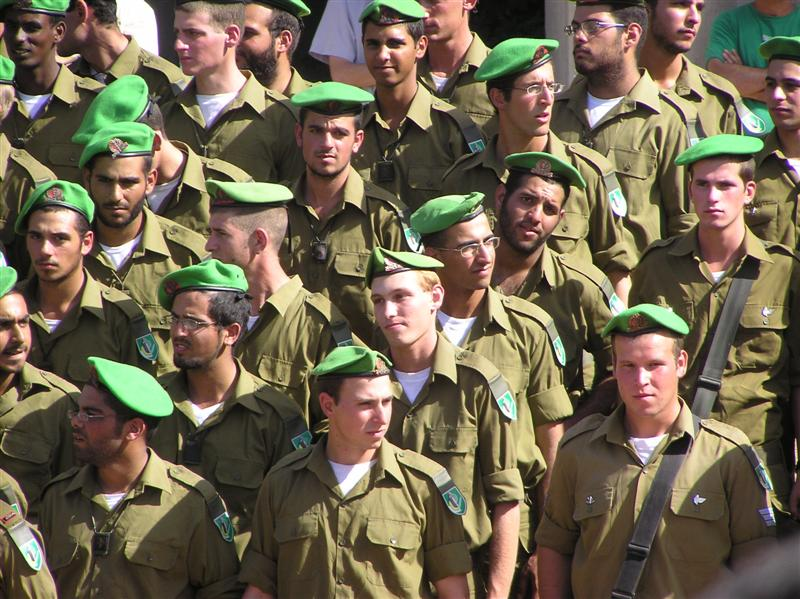
IDF Soldiers in their regular service period

National military service is mandatory for any Israeli over the age of 18, with the exception of the Arab Muslim and Christian population (currently estimated at around 20% of the Israeli population) and many ultra-Orthodox Jews (currently estimated at around 8% of the Israeli Jewish population and rising steeply). Druze and Circassian men are liable, by agreement with their community leaders. Members of the exempted groups can still volunteer, but very few do, except for the Bedouin where a relatively large number of men have tended to volunteer. The Israeli Jewish population and especially the secular Israeli Jewish population, is currently the only population group in Israel that has a mandatory military conscription for both men and women—a fact that has caused much resentment from within the Jewish community towards the non-serving population, some of which are demanding that all the Israeli citizens share an equal amount of responsibilities, whether in the Israeli army or as part of Sherut Leumi.

In addition, in the recent decades a growing minority from within the Israeli Jewish conscripts have denounced the mandatory enrollment and refused to serve, claiming that due to financial insecurities they feel that they need to be spending their time more productively pursuing their chosen studies or career paths. Some individual resentment may also be compounded by the typically low wages paid to conscripts—the current Israeli policies see National Service as a duty rendered to the country and its citizens, and therefore the Israeli army does not pay any wages to conscripts, but instead grants a low monthly allowance to the full-time national service personnel, depending on the type of their duty.

=== Jewish National Fund ===
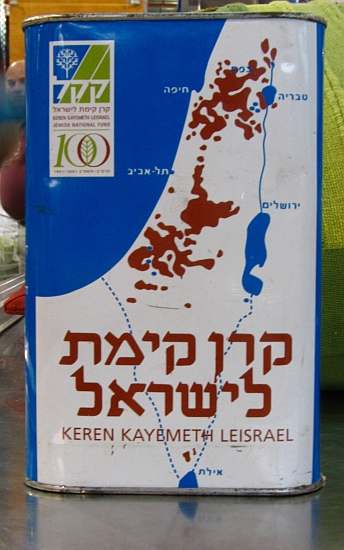
JNF collection box

The Jewish National Fund is a private organization established in 1901 to buy and develop land in the Land of Israel for Jewish settlement; land purchases were funded by donations from world Jewry exclusively for that purpose. The JNF currently owns 13% of the land in Israel, while 79.5% is owned by the government (this land is leased on a non-discriminatory basis) and the rest, around 6.5%, is evenly divided between private Arab and Jewish owners. Thus, the Israel Land Administration (ILA) administers 93.5% of the land in Israel (Government Press Office, Israel, 22 May 1997). A significant portion of JNF lands were originally properties left behind by Palestinian "absentees" and as a result the legitimacy of some JNF land ownership has been a matter of dispute. The JNF purchased these lands from the State of Israel between 1949 and 1953, after the state took control of them according to the Absentee Properties Law. While the JNF charter specifies the land is for the use of the Jewish People, land has been leased to Bedouin herders. Nevertheless, JNF land policy has been criticized as discrimination. When the Israel Land Administration leased JNF land to Arabs, it took control of the land in question and compensated the JNF with an equivalent amount of land in areas not designated for development (generally in the Galilee and the Negev), thus ensuring that the total amount of land owned by the JNF remains the same. This was a complicated and controversial mechanism, and in 2004 use of it was suspended. After Supreme Court discussions and a directive by the Attorney General instructing the ILA to lease JNF land to Arabs and Jews alike, in September 2007 the JNF suggested reinstating the land-exchange mechanism.

While the JNF and the ILA view an exchange of lands as a long-term solution, opponents say that such maneuvers privatize municipal lands and preserve a situation in which significant lands in Israel are not available for use by all of its citizens. As of 2007, the High Court delayed ruling on JNF policy regarding leasing lands to non-Jews, and changes to the ILA-JNF relationship were up in the air. Adalah and other organizations furthermore express concern that proposed severance of the relation between the ILA and JNF, as suggested by Ami Ayalon, would leave the JNF free to retain the same proportion of lands for Jewish uses as it seeks to settle hundreds of thousands of Jews in areas with a tenuous Jewish demographic majority (in particular, 100,000 Jews in existing Galilee communities and 250,000 Jews in new Negev communities via the Blueprint Negev).

=== Hebrew language in Israel ===
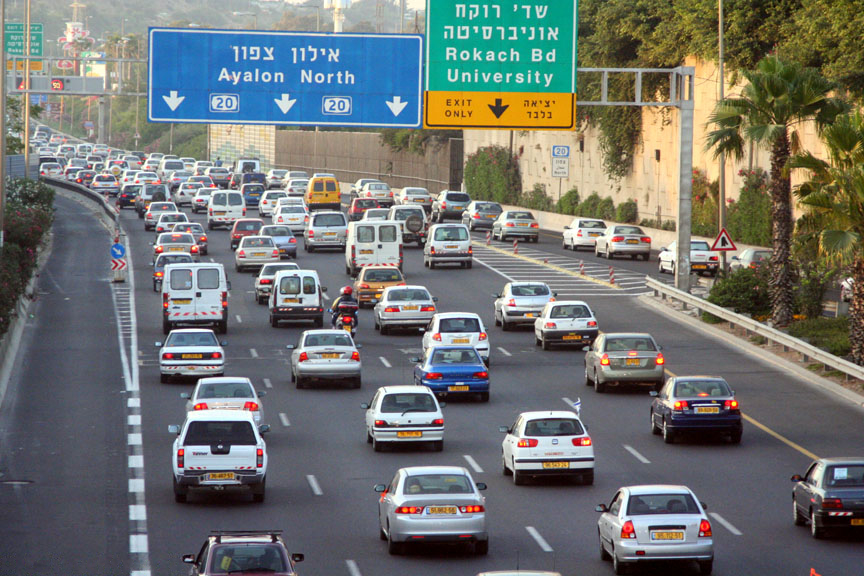
Hebrew-language signs on an Israeli highway in 2006

The main language used for communication among Israeli citizens and among the Israeli Jews is Modern Hebrew, a language that emerged in the late 19th century, based on different dialects of ancient Hebrew and influenced by Yiddish, Arabic, Slavic languages, and German.

Hebrew and Arabic are currently official languages of Israel. Government ministries publish all material intended for the public in Hebrew, with selected material translated into Arabic, English, Russian, and other languages spoken in Israel.

The country's laws are published in Hebrew, and eventually English and Arabic translations are published. Publishing the law in Hebrew in the official gazette (Reshumot) is enough to make it valid. Unavailability of an Arabic translation can be regarded as a legal defense only if the defendant proves he could not understand the meaning of the law in any conceivable way. Following appeals to the Israeli Supreme Court, the use of Arabic on street signs and labels increased dramatically. In response to one of the appeals presented by Arab Israeli organizations, the Supreme Court ruled that although second to Hebrew, Arabic is an official language of the State of Israel, and should be used extensively. Today most highway signage is trilingual, written in Hebrew, Arabic, and English.

Hebrew is the standard language of communication at places of work except inside the Arab community, and among recent immigrants, foreign workers, and with tourists. The state's schools in Arab communities teach in Arabic according to a specially adapted curriculum. This curriculum includes mandatory lessons of Hebrew as foreign language from the 3rd grade onwards. Arabic is taught in Hebrew-speaking schools, but only the basic level is mandatory.

=== Jewish national symbols ===
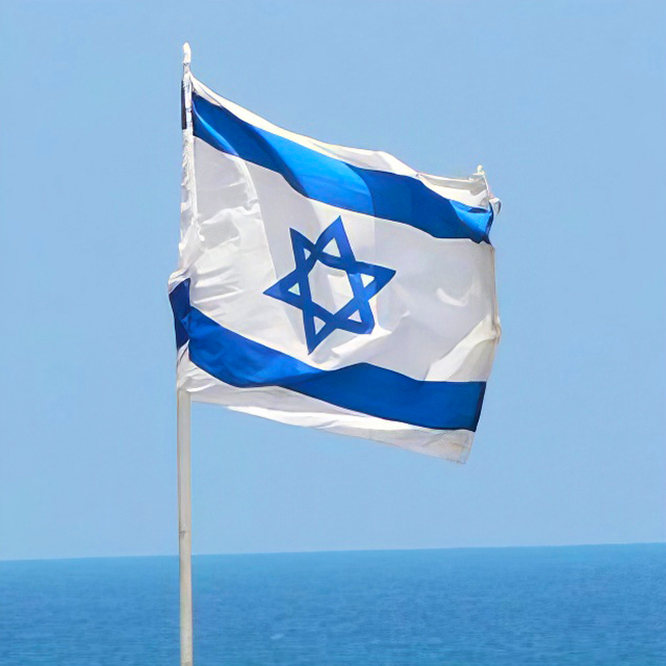
Flag of Israel

The Israeli National Anthem (Hatikvah)

The Israeli national anthem and the Israeli flag have exclusively Jewish themes and symbols:

- The Israeli National Anthem (Hatikvah), written in 1878 by secular Galician Jew Naphtali Herz Imber, revolves around the nearly 2000-year-old hope of the Jewish people to be a free and sovereign people in the Land of Israel.
- The Israeli flag, designed for the Zionist Movement in 1891, has a basic design resembling the Tallit (a Jewish prayer shawl), and features a Star of David, generally acknowledged as a symbol of Judaism.

Critics of Israel as a Jewish nation state have suggested that it should adopt more inclusive and neutral symbolism for the national flag and anthem arguing that they exclude the non-Jewish citizens of Israel from their narrative of a national identity. Defenders of the flag say that many flags in Europe bear crosses (such as the flags of Sweden, Finland, Norway, United Kingdom, Switzerland, and Greece), while flags in predominantly Muslim countries bear distinctive Muslim symbols (such as Turkey, Tunisia, Algeria, Mauritania, and Saudi Arabia).

Through the years some Israeli-Arab politicians have requested a reevaluation of the Israeli flag and Israeli national anthem, arguing that they cannot represent all citizens of Israel, including the Arab citizens of Israel. Although the proposals to change the flag have never been discussed in the state institutions, they do occasionally get to a public discussion, as part of the discussion on whether Israel is, as defined by the Basic Law: Human Dignity and Liberty, "A Jewish and Democratic State", or if it must become, as demanded by certain circles, "a state of all its citizens". The demand to change the flag is seen among many Israelis as a threat to the very essence of the state. In relation to this, in 2001 the Israeli Minister of Education Limor Livnat ordered the enforcement of the flag amendment she initiated, and ordered the raising of the flag in the front of all schools in Israel, even those serving the Arab population.

== Intercommunal relations ==
=== Israeli Jewish victims of Palestinian political violence ===
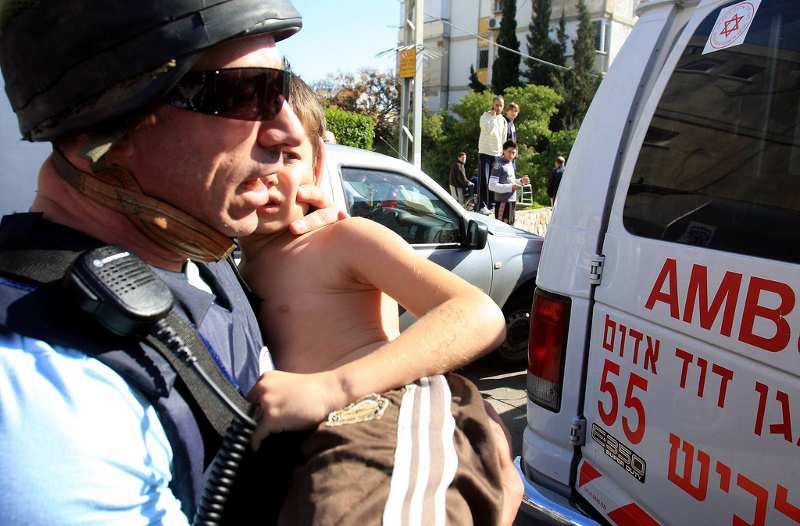
A Jewish Israeli child wounded by a Hamas Grad rocket fired on the city of Beer Sheva is taken to a hospital, 2009.

As part of the Israeli–Palestinian conflict, over the years, various Palestinian militants have carried out attacks against Israeli Jews. 2012 statistics from B'Tselem state that 3,500 Israelis have been killed and 25,000 have been wounded as a result of Palestinian violence since the establishment of the state of Israel in 1948. These figures include soldiers as well as civilians, including those killed in exchanges of gunfire. Israeli statistics listing 'hostile terrorist attacks' also include incidents which stones are thrown. Suicide bombings constituted just 0.5% of Palestinian attacks against Israelis in the first two years of the Al Aqsa Intifada, though this percentage accounted for half of the Israelis killed in that period. According to the Israel Ministry of Foreign Affairs, there were 56 terrorist attacks against Israelis from 1952 to 1967.

During the 1970s, numerous attacks against Israeli civilians were carried out by Palestinians from Lebanon. Notable incidents include the Coastal Road Massacre (25 adults and 13 children killed, 71 injured), the Avivim school bus massacre (3 adults and 9 children killed, 25 injured), the Kiryat Shmona massacre (9 adults and 9 children killed, 15 injured), the Lod Airport massacre (26 killed, 79 injured), and the Ma'alot massacre (8 adults and 23 children killed, 70 injured).

Israel Ministry of Foreign Affairs lists 96 fatal terror attacks against Israelis from September 1993 to September 2000, of which 16 were bombing attacks, resulting in 269 deaths.

During the Second Intifada, a period of increased violence from September 2000 to 2005, Palestinians carried out 152 suicide bombings and attempted to carry out over 650 more. Other methods of attack include launching Qassam rockets and mortars into Israel, kidnapping of both soldiers and civilians (including children), shootings, assassination, stabbings, and lynchings. As of November 2012, over 15,000 rockets and mortars have been fired at Israel from the Gaza Strip. Israel Ministry of Foreign Affairs reported that of the 1,010 Israelis killed between September 2000 and January 2005, 78 percent were civilians. Another 8,341 were injured in what the Israeli Ministry of Foreign Affairs referred to as terrorist attacks between 2000 and 2007.

In 2010, Israel honored the memory of all 3,971 Israeli civilian victims whom have been killed through Israel's history, as part of political violence, Palestinian political violence, and terrorism in general.

=== Public attitudes ===
There are significant tensions between Arab citizens and their Jewish counterparts. Polls differ considerably in their findings regarding intercommunal relations.

On 29 April 2007 Haaretz reported that an Israeli Democracy Institute (IDI) poll of 507 people showed that 75% of "Israeli Arabs would support a constitution that maintained Israel's status as a Jewish and democratic state while guaranteeing equal rights for minorities, while 23% said they would oppose such a definition."

In contrast, a 2006 poll commissioned by The Center Against Racism, showed negative attitudes towards Arabs, based on questions asked to 500 Jewish residents of Israel representing all levels of Jewish society. The poll found that: 63% of Jews believe Arabs are a security threat; 68% of Jews would refuse to live in the same building as an Arab; 34% of Jews believe that Arab culture is inferior to Israeli culture. Additionally, support for segregation between Jewish and Arab citizens was found to be higher among Jews of Middle Eastern origin than those of European origin. A more recent poll by the Center Against Racism (2008) found a worsening of Jewish citizens' perceptions of their Arab counterparts:

- 75% would not agree to live in a building with Arab residents.
- More than 60% wouldn't accept any Arab visitors at their homes.
- About 40% believed that Arabs should be stripped of the right to vote.
- More than 50% agree that the State should encourage emigration of Arab citizens to other countries.
- More than 59% think that Arab culture is primitive.
- When asked "What do you feel when you hear people speaking Arabic?" 31% said they feel hate and 50% said they feel fear, with only 19% stating positive or neutral feelings.

A 2007 poll conducted by Sammy Smooha, a sociologist at Haifa University, in the aftermath of the 2006 Lebanon War, found that:

- 63.3% of Jewish citizens of Israel said they avoid entering Arab towns and cities
- 68.4% of Jewish citizens of Israel fear the possibility of widespread civil unrest among Arab citizens of Israel
- 49.7% of Arab citizens of Israel said Hezbollah's kidnapping of IDF reservists Ehud Goldwasser and Eldad Regev in a cross-border raid was justified
- 18.7% of Arab citizens of Israel thought Israel was justified in going to war following the kidnapping
- 48.2% of Arab citizens of Israel said they believed that Hezbollah's rocket attacks on northern Israel during that war were justified
- 89.1% of Arab citizens of Israel said they viewed the IDF's bombing of Lebanon as a war crime
- 44% of Arab citizens of Israel said they viewed Hezbollah's bombing of Israel as a war crime
- 62% of Arab citizens of Israel worry that Israel could transfer their communities to the jurisdiction of a future Palestinian state
- 60% of Arab citizens of Israel said they are concerned about a possible mass expulsion
- 76% of Arab citizens of Israel described Zionism as racist
- 67.5% of Arab citizens of Israel said they would be content to live in the Jewish state, if it existed alongside a Palestinian state in the West Bank and Gaza Strip
- 40.5% of Arab citizens of Israel deny the Holocaust; among high school and college graduates the figure was 33%

Surveys in 2009 found a radicalization in the positions of Israeli Arabs towards the State of Israel, with 41% of Israeli Arabs recognizing Israel's right to exist as a Jewish and democratic state (down from 65.6% in 2003), and 53.7% believing Israel has a right to exist as an independent country (down from 81.1% in 2003). Polls also showed that 40% of Arab citizens engaged in Holocaust denial.

A 2010 Arab Jewish Relations Survey, compiled by Prof. Sami Smoocha in collaboration with the Jewish-Arab Center at the University of Haifa shows that:

- 71% of Arab citizens of Israel said they blamed Jews for the hardships suffered by Palestinians during and after the "Nakba" in 1948.
- 37.8% of Arab citizens of Israel denied the Holocaust.
- 11.5% of Arab citizens of Israel support the use of violence against Jews to advance Arab causes (up from 6% in 1995).
- 66.4% of Arab citizens of Israel say they reject Israel as a Jewish and Zionist state.
- 29.5% of Arab citizens of Israel opposed Israels existence under any terms.
- 62.5% of Arab citizens of Israel saw the Jews as "foreign settlers who do not fit into the region and will eventually leave, when the land will return to the Palestinians."

A 2010 poll from the Arab World for Research and Development found that:

- 91% of Arab citizens of Israel said their national historic homeland stretches from the Jordan river to the Mediterranean Sea.
- 94% of Arab citizens of Israel believe Palestinian refugees and their decedents should have the right of return and be compensated.

A range of politicians, rabbis, journalists, and historians commonly refer to the 20–25% minority of Arabs in Israel as being a "fifth column" inside the state of Israel.

== Genetics ==
Israeli Jews encompass a diverse range of Jewish communities from around the world, such as Ashkenazi, Sephardi, Mizrahi, Beta Israel, Cochin, Bene Israel, and Karaite Jews, among others, representing roughly half of all Jewish people living today. This rich tapestry of Jewish diaspora communities contributes to the genetic composition of Israeli Jews, reflecting the diverse ancestral origins of those who immigrated to Israel. Over time, these communities are growing closer together and intermixing, resulting in a dynamic and evolving genetic makeup among Israeli Jews.

Genetic studies have revealed that Jewish populations worldwide share a significant amount of Middle Eastern genetic ancestry, suggesting a common origin in the ancient Near East. This shared genetic heritage likely includes contributions from the Israelites and other ancient populations in the region. Jews also exhibit genetic signatures that indicate some degree of genetic admixture with local populations in the regions where they settled due to intermarriage, migrations, and other interactions with those populations throughout history. Jews of diverse ancestries exhibit genetic connections to neighboring non-Jewish populations in the Levant, such as the Lebanese, Samaritans, Palestinians, Bedouins, and Druze. Additionally, Ashkenazi Jews show genetic ties to Eastern and Southern European populations, which can be attributed to historical interactions and migrations.

== See also ==
- Arab citizens of Israel
- Demographics of Israel
- Religion in Israel
- History of the Jews and Judaism in the Land of Israel
- Israelites
- Mizrahi Jews
- Sabra (person)
- Yerida
- Category:Israeli Jews
