= Armenian population by country =

Armenian populations exist throughout the world. Although Armenian diaspora communities have existed since ancient times, most of the Armenians living outside of Armenia today are either descendants of Armenian genocide survivors or more recent immigrants from post-Soviet Armenia. According to various estimates, the total number of ethnic Armenians in the world is up to 11 million, a majority of whom live outside of Armenia.

The tables below list countries and territories where Armenians live according to official data and estimates by various individuals, organizations, and media. See also։ Historical Armenian population, Armenian speakers, Armenian population by urban area, and List of Armenian ethnic enclaves.

== Limitations ==
Estimates of ethnic Armenian populations may vary greatly because no reliable data is available for many countries. In France, Germany, Greece, Syria, Iran, Lebanon, among other countries, ethnicity has not been enumerated during any of the recent censuses and it is virtually impossible to determine the actual number of people of Armenian origin there. Although data for people of foreign origin (born abroad or having a foreign citizenship) is available for most European Union states, this does not present the whole picture and can hardly be taken as a source for the total number of Armenians, because in many countries, most prominently France, most ethnic Armenians are not from Armenia. Also, not all Armenian citizens and people born in Armenia are ethnic Armenians, but the overwhelming majority of them are as about 97.9% of the country's population is Armenian. For other countries, such as Russia, the official number of Armenians is believed, by many, to have been underrated, because many migrant workers live in the country.

== Most recent data ==
The following table lists all sovereign countries (member states of the United Nations), states with limited recognition (or unrecognized states), and dependent territories for which any—official or unofficial—data of Armenian population is available.

Country or territory (Note: Including unrecognized and non-UN member de facto states.)	Armenian ancestry					Armenian-born (Note: regardless of ethnicity)		Armenian citizens (Note: regardless of ethnicity)	
Country or territory	Official	Date	Low estimate	High estimate	Ref	Armenian-born		Armenian citizens	
Armenia *	2,875,697	2022	2,700,000	3,000,000	(Note: According to an independent 2018 estimate by Hrant Mikaelian, researcher at the Caucasus Institute, Armenia's total population is around 2,766,400. Around 98% of Armenia's population are ethnic Armenians, hence around 2,714,00 Armenians live in Armenia, according to Mikaelian's estimate.)	2,821,026	2011	2,995,964	2011
Russia *	946,172	2021	1,900,000	2,500,000		373,943	2021	23,517	2021
United States *	519,001	2020	500,000	1,500,000		101,757	2019	26,611	2017
France *	—		300,000	600,000		21,012	2019	22,054	2014
(Georgia (country)) Georgia * (Note: Excluding Abkhazia and South Ossetia, not controlled by the government of Georgia, which considers them occupied by Russia. Both territories are listed here separately.)	168,102	2014	170,000	250,000		12,736	2019	3,784	2014
Ukraine *	99,900	2001	120,000	150,000		47,780	2019		
Canada *	68,855	2021	90,000	100,000		4,435	2019	2,120	2016
Argentina *	—		50,000	150,000		570	2019		
Lebanon *	104,003	2022 (Note: Armenian Orthodox (Apostolic) and Armenian Catholic eligible voters for the 2022 Lebanese general election)	70,000	156,000				25,000	2020
Turkey *	—		50,000	70,000		1,076	2019	1,580	2018
Abkhazia * (Note: The political status of Abkhazia is disputed. Having unilaterally declared independence from Georgia in 1992, Abkhazia is formally recognised as an independent state by 4 UN member states (three other states previously recognised it but then withdrew their recognition), while the remainder of the international community recognizes it as de jure Georgian territory. Georgia continues to claim the area as its own territory, designating it as Russian-occupied territory.)	41,875	2021	50,000	55,000					
Australia *	22,520	2021	45,000	60,000		1,629	2019		
Uzbekistan *	34,079	2023	42,359	55,000		5,857	2019		
Germany *	—		40,000	60,000		21,263	2019	26,765	2020
Iran *	—		40,000	70,000		2,438	2019		
Bulgaria *	6,552	2011	30,000	50,000		1,840	2019	1,196	2018
Belgium *	—		30,000	50,000		1,607	2019	4,794	2018
Belarus *	9,392	2019	10,000	35,000		5,656	2019	1,622	2009
Syria *	—		25,000	28,000					
Greece *	—		20,000	40,000		13,923	2019	5,317	2017
Brazil *	—		20,000	40,000		70	2019		
Turkmenistan *	14,711	2022	20,000	30,000		7,067	2019		
United Kingdom *	—		18,000	30,000		1,589	2019		
Kazakhstan *	15,358	2021	15,000	25,000		9,555	2019	993	2009
Uruguay *	—		15,000	20,000		60	2017		
Spain *	—		12,000	40,000		12,861	2021	10,851	2017
Netherlands *	8,374	2021 (Note: With migrant background: 8,374 1st generation migration background: 5,689 2nd generation migration background: 2,685)	10,000	40,000		925	2019	1,175	2018
Iraq *	—		10,000	15,000					
Austria *	—		6,000	7,000		3,340	2021	3,164	2021
Hungary *	3,293	2011	6,000	15,000		194	2019	211	2018
Czech Republic *	—		6,000	12,000		1,954	2019	1,916	2018
Sweden *	—		5,000	13,000		3,348	2019	1,577	2018
Poland *	6,772	2021	5,000	30,000		2,228	2019	1,522	2011
Israel *	—		5,000	10,000					
Egypt *	—		5,000	8,000		158	2019		
Moldova * (Note: Excluding Transnistria, not controlled by the government of Moldova. It is listed separately here.)	1,000	2014	5,000	10,000				229	2019
United Arab Emirates *	—		5,000	11,000					
Latvia *	2,549	2023	4,500	5,000		667	2019	226	2018
Switzerland *	—		4,000	6,000		1,107	2019	738	2018
Kuwait *	—		3,000	10,000					
Cyprus *	1,831	2011 (Note: Cypriot citizens only.)	3,000	3,500		1,228	2019	600	2011
Jordan *	—		3,000	5,000		26	2019		
Venezuela *	—		3,000	4,000		33	2019		
Italy *	—		2,000	5,000		1,630	2019	1,137	2018
Romania *	1,361	2011	2,000	3,000		95	2019	99	2018
Lithuania *	1,233	2011	1,500	2,500		404	2019	174	2018
Estonia *	1,583	2019	1,400	2,000		693	2019	250	2018
Denmark *	—		1,200	3,000		989	2021	400	2021
Norway *	413	2022	1,000	2,000		347	2019	126	2018
Tajikistan *	434	2010	1,000	1,500		193	2019		
Transnistria (Note: Transnistria's political status is disputed. It considers itself to be an independent state, but this is not recognised by any UN member state. The Moldovan government and the international community consider Transnistria a part of Moldova's territory.)	807	2015	1,000	1,500					
Kyrgyzstan *	793	2019	900	3,000		2,331	2019		
Slovakia *	—		700	1,000		161	2019	59	2018
Chile *	—		600	1,500		40	2019		
Albania *	—		400	800					
Mexico *	—		400	1,500		104	2019	103	2017
China * (Note: Hong Kong Special Administrative Region is listed separately here.)	—		500	1,000				470	2020
Palestine * (West Bank)	—		500	1,000					
Costa Rica	—		400	400		7	2019		
Nicaragua *	—		380	380					
Qatar *	—		350	600					
South Ossetia (Note: South Ossetia's status is disputed. It considers itself to be an independent state, but this is recognised by only a few other countries. The Georgian government and most of the world's other states consider South Ossetia de jure a part of Georgia's territory.)	378	2015	300	800					
South Africa *	—		300	350					
North Macedonia *	—		300	300					
Serbia *	222	2011	250	300		160	2019		
Libya	—		270	270		270	2019		
Finland *	316	2019	200	700		145	2019	74	2018
Malta *	—		200	500		61	2019	10	2008
New Zealand *	276	2018	200	220		48	2013		
Philippines	—		139	139		139	2019		
Ireland	—		150	500		58	2019	135	2018
India *	—		100	150					
Portugal *	—		100	110		101	2019	102	2018
Luxembourg *	—		103	105		103	2018	105	2020
Hong Kong	—		100	100					
Monaco	—		100	100		6	2016	7 (Note: 6 have only Armenian citizenship.)	2016
Cuba *	—		80	80		3	2017		
Ethiopia *	—		80	100					
Singapore *	—		80	100					
Japan *	—		70	100				46	2017
South Korea	—		65	70				69	2016
Namibia	—		64	64		64	2019		
Nigeria	—		60	60					
Sudan	—		50	50					
Malaysia	—		45	50					
Thailand *	—		40	50					
Bahrain *	—		30	100					
Ecuador *	—		36	36		36	2019		
Morocco *	—		100	110					
Croatia	37	2011	15	15					
Taiwan	—		21	21				21	2021
Colombia *	—		16	16		16	2017		
Slovenia *	—		8	18		18	2019	8	2018
Liechtenstein	—		9	10		10	2018	9	2018
Kenya *	—		11	11		11	2017		
Tunisia	—		9	9				9	2011
Swaziland	—		8	8					
Guinea	—		8	8		8	2019		
Dominican Republic *	—		8	8		8	2017		
Panama	—		6	6		6	2010		
Iceland	—		2	10		10	2019	2	2018
Puerto Rico *	7	2018	7	7					
Bolivia *	—		5	5		5	2019		
Bermuda *	—		4	4		4	2017		
El Salvador *	—		4	4		4	2017		
Peru *	—		1	1		1	2017		
Faroe Islands * (Note: An autonomous territory within the Kingdom of Denmark)	—		1	1		1	2020		

== Unknown status or number ==
=== Countries with unspecified number ===
The following countries have Armenian populations of uncertain number; while population figures are not known definitively, Armenians are known to be present, even if relatively few:

- Azerbaijan (Armenians in Azerbaijan):

Prior to the forced displacement in September–October 2023 that followed an Azerbaijani offensive, the Republic of Artsakh (Nagorno-Karabakh), de facto independent, but internationally recognized as part of Azerbaijan, had an estimated population of up to 120,000. As of early October 2023, 100,632 have fled to Armenia, while the number of Armenians staying in Nagorno-Karabakh has been variously estimated as low as 50 and as high as 1,500. According to Nagorno-Karabakh officials, they number only 8-10 or over. The ICRC said a "small number of people remain in their homes, either by choice or because they were unable to leave by themselves".

According to the 2009 census, 217 Armenians live in Azerbaijan (outside Nagorno-Karabakh). According to estimates, the number of Armenians in Azerbaijan ranges from very few (2018) to as many as 3,000 (2001), who conceal their Armenian identity.

- Montenegro: "about 40 families"
- Saudi Arabia: "several hundred"
- Vietnam: "a small number"
- Indonesia (Armenians in Indonesia): few Armenians
- Myanmar (Armenians in Myanmar). Frontier Myanmar reported the number of Armenians "a few hundred at most" in 2019. According to Reverend John Felix, priest at the Armenian church in Yangon, the last full Armenian died in 2013, but there are "no more than 10 or 20 families who are part Armenian."

=== Countries with former or uncertain Armenian presence ===
African countries reported to have Armenians in the 1980s:

- Algeria
- Congo-Brazzaville
- Congo-Kinshasa
- Ghana
- Madagascar

The following countries previously had Armenian residents, but now record no Armenian population:

- Afghanistan (Armenians in Afghanistan)
- Bangladesh (Armenians in Bangladesh)
- Pakistan (Armenians in Pakistan)

== Armenian speakers ==
The number of Armenian-speakers by country according to government sources, including censuses and official estimates:

Country/territory (Note: Non-UN member states are indicated in italics.)	Armenian speakers	Note	Source
Armenia	2,956,615	"Mother tongue"	2011 census
Russia	829,345	"Native language"	2010 census
Russia	660,935	"Language proficiency"	2010 census
United States	240,402	"Language Spoken at Home"	2010 ACS
Georgia	144,812	"Native language"	2014 census
Ukraine	51,847	"Mother tongue"	2001 census
Canada	35,790	"Mother tongue"	2016 census
Canada	21,510	"Language spoken most often at home"	2016 census
Australia	10,205	"Language spoken at home"	2016 census
Turkmenistan	9,154	"mother tonque"	2022 census
Bulgaria	5,615	"Mother tongue"	2011 census
Belarus	5,245	"Mother tongue"	2019 census
Belarus	1,710	"Language spoken most often at home"	2019 census
Kazakhstan	4,151	"speaks"	2021 census
Kazakhstan	1,569	"uses in everyday life"	2021 census
Poland	2,115	"Mother tongue"	2011 census
Poland	1,847	"Language used in home relations"	2011 census
Cyprus	1,409		2011 census
Romania	739		2011 census
Lithuania	575	"Mother tongue"	2011 census
Hungary	444	"Mother tongue"	2011 census
Finland	316		2019 estimate
Tajikistan	219	"Mother tongue"	2010 census

== By urban area ==
The following table is the list of urban areas with the largest Armenian population, including in Armenia and the Armenian diaspora.

Cities in Armenia (list) are given for reference. Since ethnic breakdown is not available for cities besides Yerevan, 99% is given as the presumed percentage of ethnic Armenians for every city in Armenia. (Note: Armenia is a monoethnic country, where according to the 2011 census, 98.1% of the population are ethnic Armenians. In urban areas, the percentage stands at 99.04%.)

Urban area	Country	Official data				Estimates		
Urban area	Country	Armenians	Total	%	Source	Low	High	Ref
Yerevan	Armenia	1,048,940	1,060,138	98.9%	2011 census	1,091,700		
Los Angeles (Note: Los Angeles-Long Beach, CA CSA)	US	218,321	18,788,800	1.16%	2017 estimate	200,000	600,000	
Moscow (Note: Defined here as the city of Moscow (106,466) and Moscow Oblast (63,306).)	Russia	169,772	18,598,621	0.91%	2010 census	200,000	600,000	
Rostov-on-Don (Note: The Rostov agglomeration is usually defined as containing the towns of Rostov-on-Don, Bataysk, Azov, Novocherkassk, and Taganrog and the following seven districts: Neklinovsky District, Rodionovo-Nesvetaysky District, Myasnikovsky District, Kagalnitsky District, Azovsky District, Aksaysky District, and Oktyabrsky District.)	Russia	83,123	2,158,307	3.85%	2010 census	150,000	200,000	
Sochi	Russia	81,864	420,589	19.46%	2010 census	120,000	160,000	
Gyumri	Armenia	121,976		99%	2011 census	112,100		
Paris	France	—				100,000	200,000	
Caucasian Mineral Waters (Note: The agglomeration Caucasian Mineral Waters, within southern Stavropol Krai, contains the following municipalities: Georgiyevsky District (including the town of Georgiyevsk, 13,905), Mineralovodsky District (including the town of Mineralnye Vody, 11,734), Predgorny District (7,663) and the following towns: Pyatigorsk (31,085), Kislovodsk (12,033), Yessentuki (3,630), Zheleznovodsk (3,211), and Lermontov (482).)	Russia	83,743	874,022	9.58%	2010 census	83,000	108,000	(Note: Estimates: Pyatigorsk: 30,000–40,000; Kislovodsk: 15,000; Georgiyevsk: 15,000-20,000–25,000-30,000; Mineralye Vody: 12,000; Yessentuki: 8,000; Zheleznovodsk: 3,000; Total: 83,000–108,000)
Tbilisi	Georgia	53,409	1,108,717	4.8%	2020 census	80,000	120,000	
Marseille	France	—				80,000	150,000	
Volgograd (Note: Volgograd agglomeration defined as the towns of Volgograd (15,200) and Volzhsky (2,703) and the municipalities of Gorodishchensky District (1,323), Svetloyarsky District (425), and Sredneakhtubinsky District (614).)	Russia	20,265	1,505,809	1.35%	2010 census	80,000	120,000	
Vanadzor	Armenia	86,199		99%	2011 census	76,900		
Krasnodar (Note: Krasnodar agglomeration containing the city of Krasnodar (30,836) and the municipalities of Dinskoy District (5,360), Seversky District (2,252) and Goryachy Klyuch (1,773) in Krasnodar Krai and in Adygea: Takhtamukaysky District (2,022), Teuchezhsky District (230), and Adygeysk (78).)	Russia	42,558	1,232,176	3.45%	2010 census	70,000	70,000	
Chernomorsk (Note: The agglomeration (or economic zone) of Chernomorsk (Black Sea coast) contains the following five municipalities on the Black Sea coast of the Krasnodar Krai: Tuapse (17,334), Anapa (13,210), Novorossiysk (12,228), Gelendzhik (2,283) and Temryuksky District (2,217).)	Russia	47,272	781,289	6.05%	2010 census	63,000	86,000	(Note: Estimates: Tuapse:20,000–25,000; Anapa: 15,000–23,000; Novorossiysk: 20,000–30,000; Gelendzhik: 8,000; Total: 63,000–86,000)
Buenos Aires	Argentina	—				60,000	70,000	
New York (Note: New York-Newark, NY-NJCT-PA CSA)	US	34,978	23,876,155	0.15%	2017 estimate	50,000	150,000	
Saint Petersburg (Note: Defined here as the city (19,971) and the Leningrad Oblast (7,072).)	Russia	27,043	6,596,434	0.4%	2010 census	50,000	100,000	
Boston (Note: Boston-Worcester-Providence, MA-RI-NH-CT CSA)	US	37,534	8,233,270	0.46%	2017 estimate	50,000	70,000	
Istanbul	Turkey	—				50,000	60,000	
Vagharshapat	Armenia	46,540		99%	2011 census	46,400		
Lyon	France	—				45,000	100,000	
Tehran	Iran	—				45,000	50,000	
Abovyan	Armenia	43,495		99%	2011 census	45,000		
Kapan	Armenia	43,190		99%	2011 census	42,000		
Armavir (Note: The Armavir agglomeration includes the town of Armavir (19,344) and the surrounding Otradnensky District (6,347), Novokubansky District (5,997) Uspensky District (2,014), and Gulkevichsky District (1,911).)	Russia	35,613	502,070	7.09%	2010 census			
Beirut	Lebanon	—				40,000	120,000	
Toronto	Canada	21,710	6,417,516	0.34%	2016 census	40,000	50,000	
Montreal	Canada	26,100	4,098,927	0.64%	2016 census	40,000	50,000	
Detroit (Note: Detroit–Warren–Ann Arbor CSA)	US	10,834	5,336,286	0.2%	2017 estimate	40,000	40,000	
Hrazdan	Armenia	41,875		99%	2011 census	39,900		
San Francisco Bay Area (Note: San Jose-San Francisco-Oakland, CA CSA)	US	18,806	8,837,789	0.21%	2017 estimate	35,000	50,000	
Armavir	Armenia	29,319		99%	2011 census	27,700		
Sydney	Australia	12,553	4,823,994	0.26%	2016 census	25,000	30,000	
Stavropol (Note: Stavropol agglomeration containing town of Stavropol (17,821) and the surrounding Shpakovsky District (7,994).)	Russia	25,815	521,825	4.95%	2010 census	25,000	80,000	
Masis	Armenia	20,215		99%	2011 census	20,700		
Charentsavan	Armenia	20,363		99%	2011 census	20,300		
Ararat	Armenia	20,235		99%	2011 census	20,300		
Aleppo	Syria	—				20,000	40,000	
Samara-Tolyatti (Note: Entirely within Samara Oblast, it contains the following 8 cities: Samara (7,424), Tolyatti (4,417), Syzran (1,529), Novokuybyshevsk (644), Chapayevsk (470), Kinel (780), Zhigulyovsk (355), Oktyabrsk (121) and 9 municipalities: Bezenchuksky District (384), Volzhsky District (990), Kinelsky District (294), Krasnoarmeysky District (332), Krasnoyarsky District (942), Privolzhsky District (254), Stavropolsky District (399), Syzransky District (272), Shigonsky District (194).)	Russia	19,801	2,746,158	0.72%	2010 census	20,000	22,000	
Ijevan	Armenia	21,081		99%	2011 census	20,000		
Goris	Armenia	20,591		99%	2011 census	19,900		
Artashat	Armenia	22,269		99%	2011 census	19,100		
Gavar	Armenia	20,765		99%	2011 census	17,900		

== Bibliography ==
- Ayvazyan, Hovhannes, ed. (2003). Հայ Սփյուռք հանրագիտարան [Encyclopedia of the Armenian Diaspora] (in Armenian). Yerevan: Armenian Encyclopedia Publishing. ISBN 5-89700-020-4.
- Harutyunyan, Lilit; Pashayan, Araks (2012). Ծոցի արաբական երկների հայ համայնքները. արդի հիմնախնդիրներ [Armenian Communities of the Gulf's Arab States: Current Problems] (PDF) (in Armenian). Yerevan: Ministry of Diaspora of the Republic of Armenia, Institute of Oriental Studies, National Academy of Sciences of the Republic of Armenia. ISBN 978-9939-834-36-8. Archived from the original (PDF) on 16 August 2019. (archived)
- Harutyunyan, Gagik, ed. (2009). Հայկական տեղեկատվական համայնքային ռեսուրսները հետխորհրդային երկրներում [Informational Resources of the Armenian Communities of the Post-Soviet States] (PDF) (in Armenian). Yerevan: Noravank Foundation. ISBN 978-9939-9000-7-0. Archived from the original (PDF) on 18 August 2019.
- Zhamkochyan, Anna, ed. (2011). Արեվելյան Եվրոպայի հայ համայնքների խնդիրները [Problems of the Armenians in Eastern Europe] (PDF) (in Armenian). Yerevan: Noravank Foundation. ISBN 978-9939-825-08-3. Archived from the original (PDF) on 16 August 2019.
