= Jewish demography =

Jewish demography may refer to:

- Historical Jewish population comparisons
- Jewish population - for the current position
