= Muslim Armenians =

Muslim Armenians may refer to:

- Hidden Armenians, Christian Armenians of Turkey and their descendants who became Islamized and Turkified or Kurdified to escape the Armenian genocide
- Hemshin people, an ethnic group of Armenian origin who were originally Christian but were Islamized during the Ottoman Empire
