= Armenian New Zealanders =

Ethnic group in New Zealand

Armenian New Zealanders Հայերը Նոր Զելանդիայում
Total population
- Armenian; 264 (2018 Census)

Regions with significant populations
- Auckland · Wellington

Languages
- New Zealand English · Armenian · Russian

Religion
- Majority Armenian Apostolic Church

Armenian New Zealanders refers to New Zealand citizens or permanent residents who are fully or partially of Armenian descent. According to the 2018 census, 264 New Zealanders declared their ethnicity as Armenian.

Although Armenia is located in the South Caucasus, ethnic Armenians are classified as a subset of Europeans under the Ethnicity New Zealand Standard Classification by Stats NZ Tatauranga Aotearoa.

The earliest Armenian community appeared in the 1860s; they were mostly gold miners. However, the majority of Armenians migrated to New Zealand around the 1990s.

== Organisations ==
The country's largest Armenian organisation is the Auckland-based Armenian Society of New Zealand (ASNZ). It was founded in 1996 and is currently headed by Hermik Sookiassian. ASNZ defines its mission as follows: "To aid and facilitate the preservation of the Armenian identity amongst the Armenians of New Zealand, as well as be a central point of contact for anyone seeking to learn more about Armenia and Armenians."

In 2018, a monument to the Armenian alphabet was carved in Armenia and shipped to New Zealand where it was installed by the Meadowood Community House in Unsworth Heights where ASNZ members hold regular meetings and cultural events.

Saint Gregory the Illuminator Armenian Apostolic Church is an Auckland-based religious community without a permanent physical location. Occasional services are held in various Anglican church buildings when Armenian priests visit Auckland from Australia and elsewhere.

A smaller group called the Armenian Association of Wellington exists in New Zealand's capital and third-largest city, Wellington.

== Notable Armenian New Zealanders ==
- Rouben Azizian, security studies academic
- Sian Elias, 12th chief justice of New Zealand
- Doug Zohrab, diplomat

== See also ==
- Armenian Australians
- Armenian diaspora
- Foreign relations of Armenia
- Immigration to New Zealand
