= Ahmet Abakay =

Turkish journalist and writer

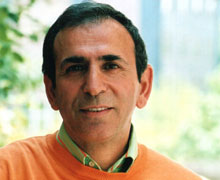
- Born: 3 April 1950 (age 76); Divriği, Sivas Province, Turkey
- Occupations: Writer and journalist

Ahmet Abakay (born 3 April 1950) is a Turkish journalist, author, and the head of the Progressive Journalists' Association (Turkish: Çağdaş Gazeteciler Cemiyeti Başkanı). He is the author of many books, including The Last Words of Hoşana (Hoşana'nın Son Sözü) and The Minister Counselors' Notepad (Bakan Danışmanı'nın Not Defteri). His most recent book published in 2013, The Last Words of Hoşana, is about his mother, who revealed her Armenian identity just weeks before she died. Due to his recent revelations in the book, Abakay has received harsh criticism from his family members.

== Life ==
Ahmet Abakay was born in Sivas Province on 3 April 1950 in the village of Divriği. He received his early education from a high school in Erzincan. He then continued his education at Ankara University where he ultimately graduated. He was a correspondent to many Turkish news agencies and newspapers including İsta Haber, Vatan, Anka, and Özgür Gündem. Ahmet Abakay then became involved in the establishment of the Progressive Journalists' Association of Turkey. The association was established on 23 February 1978 and whose founding member was Alaatin Orhan. Ahmet Abakay became the chairman in 1982 until 1989. By the end of his chairmanship in 1989, the organization had 1,100 members throughout the country. He was an advisor to the Minister of the Press between 1992 and 2002. Abakay then became the chairman once again in 2005 and continues to serve the position till today.

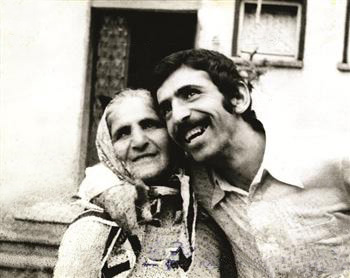
Ahmet Abakay with his mother Hoşana.

Ahmet Abakay, a critic of the treatment of journalists in Turkish society, has stated that "Those who are not close to the government can't survive in the media. Media members are living in fear."

He is married and has one daughter.

== Revelations about his mother ==
"My mother told me about her story 13 years ago and soon after, she died. I could write this only 10 years later, because I hesitated. I hardly wrote it, bursting into tears when writing all of the chapters and I was stuck. I did not imagine that it could get that sentimental for me to write it. My mother was left at some people's door like an innocent kitten and that idea filled me with grief"

— Ahmet Abakay about his writing his book

Ahmet Abakay wrote a book in 2013 entitled The Last Words of Hoşana (Turkish: Hoşana'nın Son Sözü) which describes the life of his mother, who was named Hoşana. In the book, Abakay revealed that his mother had told him of her Armenian identity weeks before her death. She had kept her identity a secret for 82 years, which Abakay believes was because "she lived in fear." Abakay was told by his mother not to tell the secret to anybody. Abakay states his mother was saved from the Armenian genocide because she was dropped off in front of a door of an Alevi Turk. Due to his revelations, Abakay received threats from his family and particularly his uncle's children who said, "how dare you call our aunt Armenian and insult our family's honor. You will remove the Armenian part from your book, otherwise we will pull it off the shelves."

== Works ==
Some of Abakay's works include:

- Politik Göçmenler (Amaç Yayınları, 1988)
- Bu Oyuna Gelmeyin (Amaç Yayınları, 1990)
- The Minister Counselors' Notepad (Turkish: Bakan Danışmanı'nın Not Defteri) (İmge Kitabevi Yayınları, 2008)
- The Last Words of Hoşana (Turkish: Hoşana'nın Son Sözü) (2013)

== See also ==
- Crypto-Armenians
- Armenian genocide
