= Hidden Armenians =

Turkish-Armenians who conceal their Armenian identity

Hidden Armenians (Armenian: թաքնված հայեր, romanized: t’ak’nvats hayer; Turkish: Gizli Ermeniler) or crypto-Armenians (Kripto Ermeniler) is an umbrella term to describe Turkish citizens hiding their full or partial Armenian ancestry from the larger Turkish society. They are mostly descendants of Ottoman Armenians who, at least outwardly, were Islamized (and Turkified or Kurdified) under the threat of physical extermination during the Armenian genocide.

Turkish journalist Erhan Başyurt (Note: Başyurt is the author of Armenian Adoptees: Hidden Lives (Ermeni Evlatlıklar, Saklı Kalmış Hayatlar), a book on Crypto-Armenians published in 2006.) describes hidden Armenians as "families (and in some cases, entire villages or neighbourhoods) [...] who converted to Islam to escape the deportations and death marches [of 1915], but continued their hidden lives as Armenians, marrying among themselves and, in some cases, clandestinely reverting to Christianity." According to the 2012 European Commission report on Turkey, a "number of crypto-Armenians have started to use their original names and religion." The Economist suggests that the number of Turks who reveal their Armenian background is growing. In Turkish, they are referred to by the derogatory term "leftovers of the sword" (Turkish: kılıç artıkları).

== History ==
=== Background ===
Armenians are originally from the Armenian Highlands. The western parts of what is called the Six Vilayets came under the Ottoman Empire's control in the 16th century with the Peace of Amasya. Armenians remained an overwhelming majority of the area's population until the 17th century; however, their number gradually decreased, and by the early 20th century they constituted up to 38% of the population of Western Armenia, designed at the time as the Six Vilayets. Kurds made up a significant part of the population.

=== Armenian genocide ===
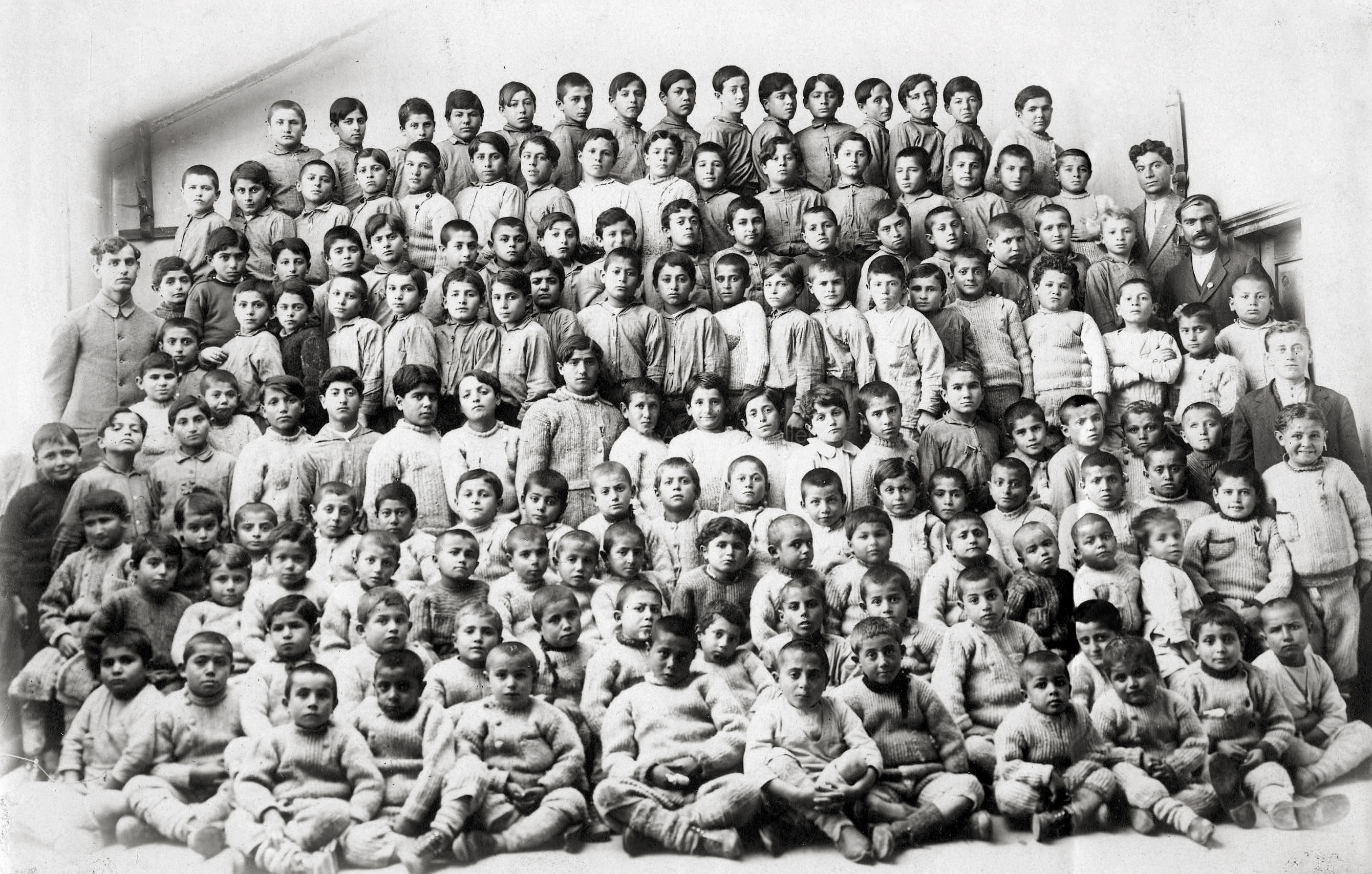
Armenian orphans at Anatolia College in Merzifon

In 1915 and the following years, the Armenians living in their ancestral lands in the Ottoman Empire were systematically exterminated by the Young Turk government in the Armenian genocide. The Ittihadists, who perpetrated the genocide, did not have the same understanding of race and nationality as the Nazis. They understood nationality as something could be changed by religious conversion to Islam, and likewise, Protestant and Catholic Armenians could be exempted from deportation.

Daniel Jonah Goldhagen explains that perpetrators differ in how they treat the targeted group's children: "In some instances, owing to the perpetrators' social theory, they treat children of groups targeted because of ethnicity or nationality radically differently from their parents. The Turks conceiving of their existential enemies the Armenians not entirely coherently, an unstable agglomeration of a national/ethnic/religious-based hatred, nevertheless had a decidedly nonracist view of them." He further explains that the Turks adopted a formal policy of "leaving the girls and children to be islamized". Although many children were killed, some were spared and allowed to live as Turks. Genocide historian Norman Naimark writes:

"Thousands of Armenian children were raised as Muslims and Turks, while women and girls were routinely converted, taken into harems, and married to Turkish, Kurdish and Circassian husbands. In the period 1918-1922, some of these women and children, encouraged by the Western powers and anti-Ittihadist Ottoman officials, reconnected with their Armenian families and communities. But women seventeen or over or those married to Muslims could choose to stay with their new families, and many did. Under the French occupation, many Armenian children were turned over by Turkish families to the Armenian community, but, wrote one Armenian officer, 'many of them want to go back.'"

When relief workers and surviving Armenians started to search for and claim back these Armenian orphans after World War I, only a small percentage were found and reunited, while many others continued to live as Muslims. Additionally, there were cases of entire families converting to Islam to survive the genocide.

=== Republican period ===
"After converting to Islam, many of the crypto-Armenians said they still faced unfair treatment: their land was often confiscated, the men were humiliated with "circumcision checks" in the army and some were tortured." Between the 1930s and 1980s, the Turkish government conducted a secret investigation of hidden Armenians.

The term "Crypto-Armenians" appears as early as 1956.

=== Recent developments ===
According to Turkish sources, hidden Armenians in Turkey no longer feel they have to keep their Armenian identity secret. Some have been baptized into the Church and started using Armenian names.

In 2010, a mass was held at the Cathedral of the Holy Cross in Aghtamar (called Akdamar Kilisesi in Turkish) for the first time in 95 years. After a million-dollar restoration, the church was reopened as a museum in 2007. 2010 marked the first Christian prayer service at Aghtamar since the genocide. In September 2010, 2,000 Armenians attended a mass at the Cathedral.

When the Surp Giragos Church was reopened in 2011, dozens of Armenians who had been raised Muslim participated in a baptism ceremony at the restored church. The names of those who participated in the baptism ceremony, conducted by Deputy Patriarch Archbishop Aram Ateşyan, were not released publicly for security reasons. Turkish-Armenians who wish to convert must first file for a formal "change of religion" at court. They then go to the Church where they learn about the foundational teachings of the Christian faith. When it is decided that the applicant has understood these teachings, they are permitted to prepare for the baptism ceremony.

In 2012, Agos reported that the head of the Dersim Armenians Faith and Ancestry Assistance Organization (Dersimli Ermeniler İnanç ve Soyal Yardımlaşma Derneği) has said that hidden Armenians have nothing to fear in the present day.

In May 2015, 12 Armenians from Tunceli were baptized. The twelve Armenians were baptized together in a collective ceremony after a six-month education about Christian beliefs.

As of 2015, there are twenty Armenian schools in Istanbul. Armenian and Muslim families live in mixed neighborhoods. In the past Armenian was only spoken at home, but some Armenians living in Istanbul report that they now speak Armenian openly in the streets.

In 2009, Aziz Dağcı, co-founder of the Union of Social Solidarity and Culture for Armenian Minorities living in the Provinces of Bitlis, Batman, Van, Mush and the District of Sason (Bitlis, Batman, Muş, Van İller ve İlçeleri ve Köylerinin Ermenileri ile Sason ve Köylerinin Ermeni Azınlıklarının Sosyal Yardımlaşma ve Kültürel Vakfı) tried to register the foundation at the Istanbul court but his application was denied. His appeal before the Court of Cassation was rejected. In 2011, he filed a complaint before the European Court of Human Rights arguing that such refusal infringed on minority rights guaranteed for Armenians in Turkey under the Treaty of Lausanne. After unsuccessful negotiations between Dağcı and the Turkish government, the Turkish government unilaterally recognized that the refusal was illegal, accepted registration of the foundation, and gave €3,600 to Dağcı to cover his pecuniary and non-pecuniary damage. In December 2021, the Court accepted the settlement as fair and closed the case.

== Literature ==
One of the first books to draw international attention to hidden Armenians was My Grandmother: An Armenian-Turkish Memoir written by Armenian-Turkish writer Fethiye Çetin. Along with Çetin, Ayse Gul Altinay, Gerard Libaridian, and Maureen Freely co-edited an anthology of testimonies of Islamized Armenians called The Grandchildren.

Avedis Hadjian's Secret Nation: The Hidden Armenians of Turkey is an exhaustive survey of the Islamicized or hidden Armenians who live in the former Armenian provinces of Turkey as well as other parts of the country.

== Regions ==
Most Crypto-Armenians reside in the eastern provinces of Turkey, where the pre-genocide Armenian population was concentrated.

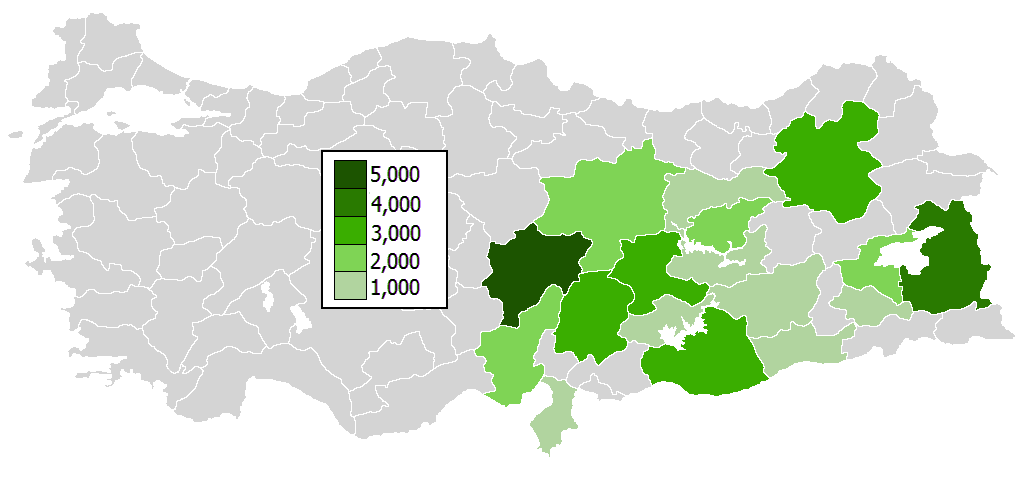
Crypto-Armenian families in Turkey by provinces 2007, showing a 36,000 total.

Dersim region, which was renamed Tunceli in the 1930s.

=== Tunceli (Dersim) Armenians ===
Through the 20th century, an unknown number of Armenians living in the mountainous region of Tunceli (Dersim) had converted to Alevism. During the Armenian genocide, many of the Armenians in the region were saved by their Kurdish neighbors. According to Mihran Prgiç Gültekin, the head of the Union of Dersim Armenians, around 75% of the population of Dersim are "converted Armenians." He reported in 2012 that over 200 families in Tunceli have declared their Armenian descent, but others are afraid to do so. In April 2013, Aram Ateşyan, the acting Armenian Patriarch of Constantinople, stated that 90% of Tunceli's population is of Armenian origin.

=== Diyarbakır ===
There are still some surviving church towers in the now predominantly Muslim city, but most of the churches are in a dilapidated condition. In the past, Christian Armenians had to remain hidden but the situation has improved. The Armenian community has restored one of the churches and Armenian language lessons are available.

== Notable people ==
- Fethiye Çetin (born 1950 in Maden, Elâzığ Province), lawyer, writer and human rights activist
- Ahmet Abakay (born 1950 in Divriği), journalist
- Yaşar Kurt (born 1968), rock singer
- Ruhi Su (1912-1985), musician

== Number ==
Various scholars and authors have estimated the number of individuals of full or partial Armenian descent living in Turkey. The range of the estimates is great due to different criteria used. Most of these numbers do not make a distinction between hidden Armenians and Islamized Armenians. According to journalist Erhan Başyurt the main difference between the two groups is their self-identity. Islamized Armenian, in his words, are "children of women who were saved by Muslim families and have continued their lives among them", while hidden Armenians "continued their hidden lives as Armenians."

Number	Author	Description	Year
30,000–40,000	Tessa Hofmann, German scholar of Armenian studies	"Muslim 'crypto-Armenians' ... who have adapted to the Kurdish or Turkish majority"	2002
100,000	Mesrob II, Armenian Patriarch of Constantinople	"at least 100,000 Armenian converts to Islam"	2007
100,000	Erhan Başyurt, Turkish journalist	additional 40,000 to 60,000 Islamized Armenians	2006
100,000	Salim Cöhce, History Professor at the İnönü University		2005
300,000	Hrant Dink, Turkish-Armenian journalist from Malatia		2005
300,000	Yervand Baret Manuk, Turkish-Armenian Armenologist	additional 1,000,000 to 2,000,000 Islamized Armenians	2010
500,000	Yusuf Halaçoğlu, Turkish historian		2009
700,000	Karen Khanlaryan, Iranian Armenian journalist and MP	700,000 hidden Armenians and 1,300,000 Islamized Armenians	2005
2,000,000	Keith David Watenpaugh, historian	"Two million contemporary Turks may have at least one Armenian grandparent..."	2013
3,000,000	Haykazun Alvrtsyan, Armenian researcher	"In Germany alone, there were 300,000 Muslim Armenians. He insisted that today in the Eastern part of Turkey, in various areas of historic Armenia there live at least 2.5 million Muslim Armenians, half of which are hiding."	2014
3,000,000–5,000,000	Aziz Dağcı, the President of the NGO "Union of Social Solidarity and Culture for Bitlis, Batman, Van, Mush and Sasun Armenians" (Bitlis, Batman, Muş, Van İller ve İlçeleri ve Köylerinin Ermenileri ile Sason ve Köylerinin Ermeni Azınlıklarının Sosyal Yardımlaşma ve Kültürel Vakfı)	Islamized Armenians	2011
4,000,000–5,000,000	Sarkis Seropyan, the editor of the Armenian section of Agos	Islamized Armenians, more than half of which "confess that their ancestors have been Armenian"	2013

== See also ==
- Anti-Armenian sentiment in Turkey
- Armenia without Armenians
- Armenian question
- Armenians in the Ottoman Empire
- Armenians in Turkey
- Crypto-Christianity
- Crypto-Judaism
- Crypto-paganism
- Dönmeh
- Hayhurum
- Hemshin people
- Kurdification
- Passing (racial identity)
- Six Vilayets
- Turkification
- Vorpahavak
- Western Armenia
- Western Armenian
- White genocide
- Wilsonian Armenia

== Bibliography ==
- Hadjian, Avedis (2018). Secret Nation: The Hidden Armenians of Turkey. I.B.Tauris. ISBN 9781788311991
- Melkonyan, Ruben (2008). "The Problem of Islamized Armenians in Turkey" (PDF). Yerevan: Noravank Foundation.
- Melkonyan, Ruben (2009). Իսլամացված հայերի խնդիրների շուրջ [On the Issues of Islamized Armenians] (in Armenian). Yerevan: Noravank Foundation.
- Altınay, Ayşe Gül; Turkyilmaz, Yektan (2011). "Unraveling layers of gendered silencing: Converted Armenian survivors of the 1915 catastrophe". In Singer, Amy; Neumann, Christoph K.; Somel, Selcuk Aksin (eds.). Untold Histories of the Middle East: Recovering Voices from the 19th and 20th Centuries. SOAS/Routledge Studies on the Middle East. Abingdon, Oxon: Routledge. ISBN 9780203845363.
- Altınay, Ayşe Gül; Çetin, Fethiye (2014). The Grandchildren: The Hidden Legacy of 'Lost' Armenians in Turkey. Transaction Publishers. ISBN 978-1412853910.
- "Turkey's hidden Armenians search for stolen identity". France 24. 21 April 2015.
- Kurt, Ümit (2016). "Cultural Erasure: The Absorption and Forced Conversion of Armenian Women and Children, 1915-1916". Études arméniennes contemporaines (7). doi:10.4000/eac.997. ISSN 2269-5281.
- Papazian, H. (2020). Contesting Armenianness: plurality, segregation and multilateral boundary making among Armenians in contemporary Turkey (PhD thesis). University of Oxford.
