= Armenia–United Arab Emirates relations =

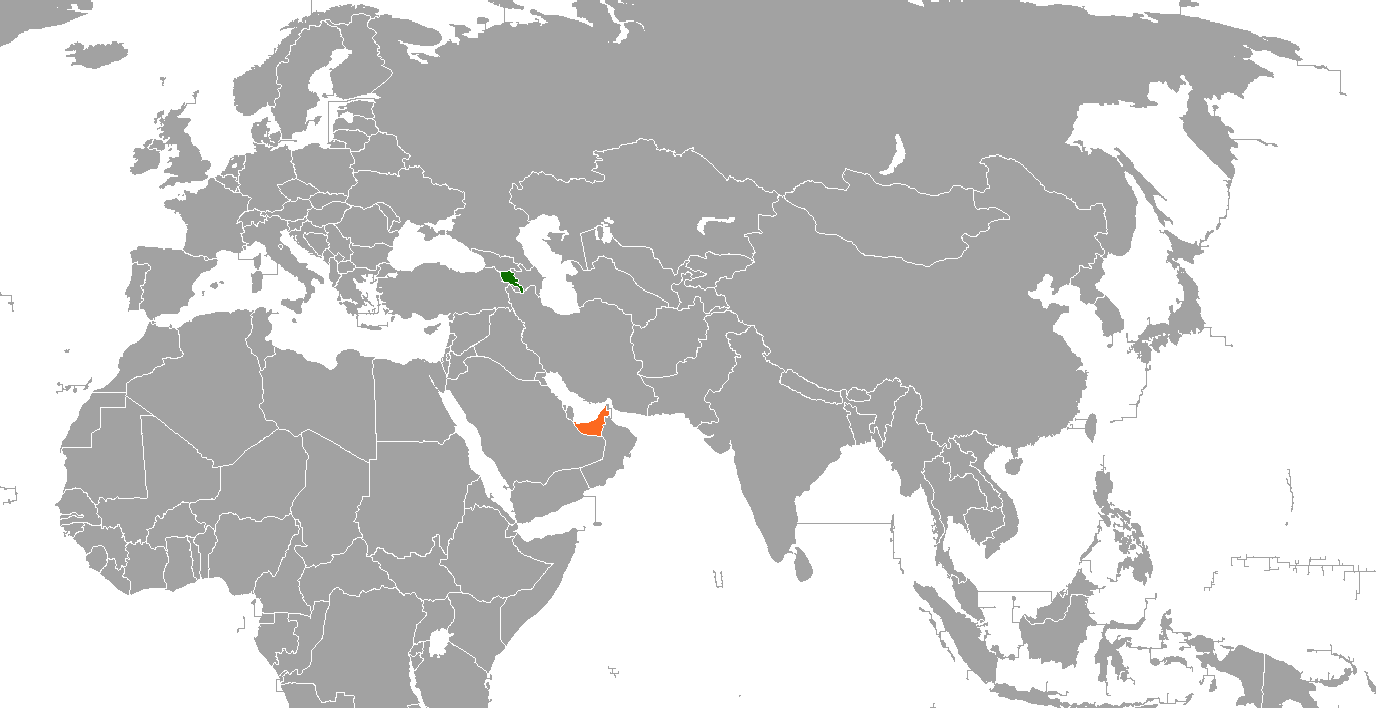

- Armenia: United Arab Emirates

Armenia–United Arab Emirates relations are the diplomatic relations between Armenia and the United Arab Emirates. Official relations have existed between both nations since 1998. Armenia has an embassy in Abu Dhabi and a consulate in Dubai. The United Arab Emirates has embassy in Yerevan. The United Arab Emirates is not among the countries that recognize the Armenian genocide.

== Political history ==
=== Establishment of relations ===
Armenia and the United Arab Emirates established diplomatic relations on June 25, 1998. Armenia opened an embassy in Abu Dhabi in 2000 and a consulate in Dubai in 2017. The UAE opened their embassy in Yerevan in 2015. The Armenia-UAE Intergovernmental Joint Commission held its first session in Yerevan in May, 2010, highlighting financial, trade, economic, food security and scientific-educational spheres as priority directions of cooperation. The UAE president Sheikh Khalifa bin Zayed Al Nahyan congratulated Armenia on 21 September 2020 for gaining independence from the Soviet Union, along with cables from Vice President Sheikh Mohammed bin Rashid Al Maktoum and Deputy Supreme Commander of the UAE Armed Forces Sheikh Mohamed bin Zayed Al Nahyan.

=== Alliance against Turkey ===
In recent years, due to growing Turkish influence initiated by Recep Tayyip Erdoğan, relations between two nations greatly improved. The United Arab Emirates have been hostile to Turkish ambitions and have clashed for influences over Syria, Sudan and Libya; while Armenia's relationship with Turkey has been poor due to Armenian genocide dispute.

=== Armenian genocide recognition ===
Increasing tensions between the United Arab Emirates and Turkey have also prompted the United Arab Emirates to seek closer tie with Armenia, resulting in an official statement in April 2019 by the United Arab Emirates that it would slowly begin to recognize the Armenian genocide. Emirate of Abu Dhabi had become the first emirate to recognize the genocide in April 2019.

== Economic and military relations ==
As for the result of growing Armenian–Emirati tie, increasing economic and military cooperation has been witnessed.

During the 2020 Nagorno-Karabakh war with Azerbaijan, Armenian President Armen Sargsyan was invited to deliver a speech on the Emirati–Saudi Arabian channel Al Arabiya, urging the international community to stop Turkey from intervening in the conflict. Shortly after the end of the war, Sarkissian paid a working visit to UAE, where he met Crown Prince of Abu Dhabi, Mohammed bin Zayed bin Sultan Al Nahyan and discussed bilateral cooperation between the countries.

== Resident diplomatic missions ==
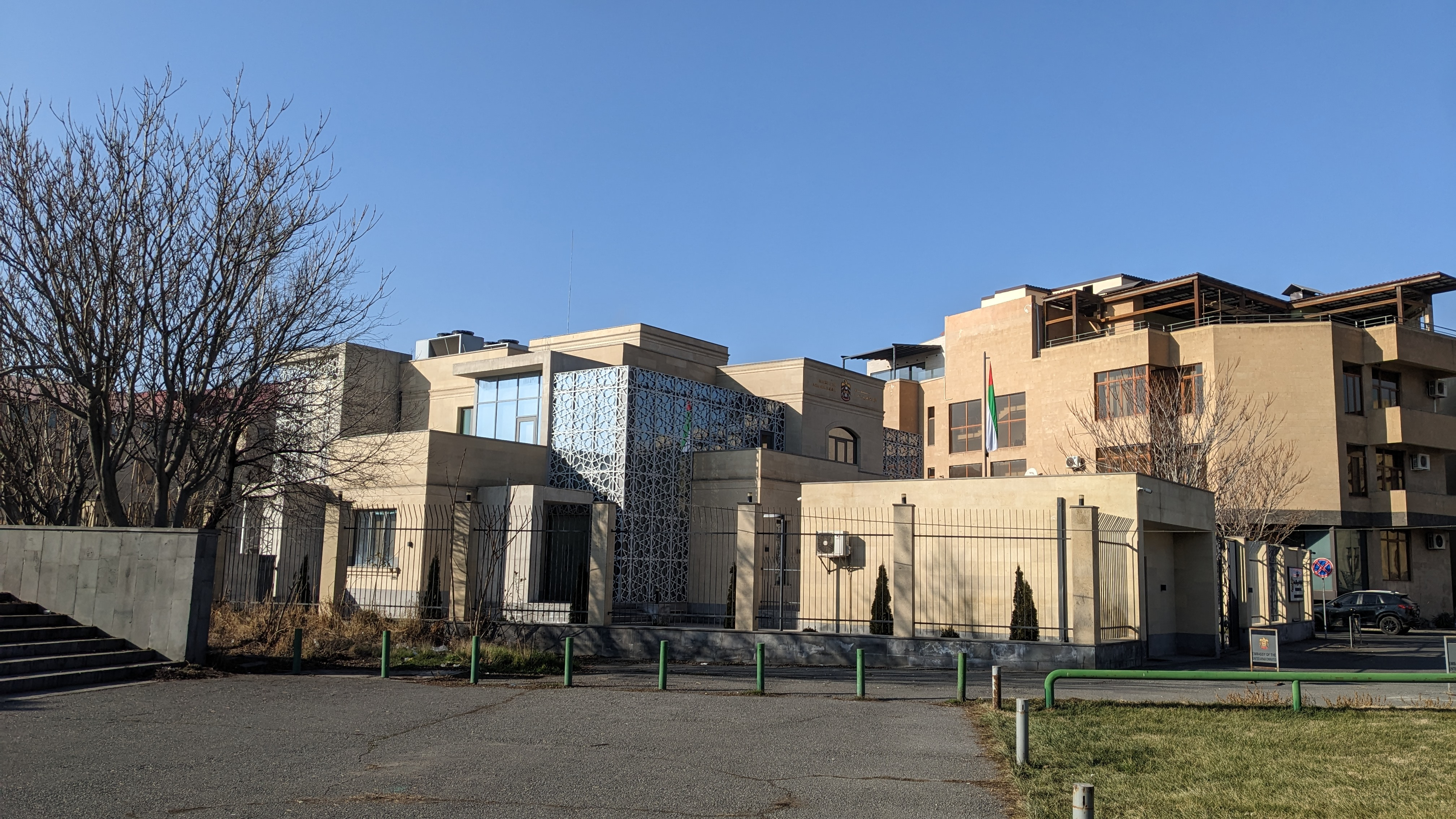
Embassy of the United Arab Emirates in Yerevan

- Armenia has an embassy in Abu Dhabi.
- United Arab Emirates has an embassy in Yerevan.

== See also ==
- Foreign relations of Armenia
- Foreign relations of the United Arab Emirates
- Armenians in the United Arab Emirates
