= Historical Armenian population =

Accurate or reliable data for historical populations of Armenians is scarce, but scholars and institutions have proposed estimates for different periods.

For most recent data on Armenian populations, see Armenian population by country.

== Pre-modern ==
Tadevos Hakobyan, Elizabeth Redgate, and David Marshall Lang all estimate that historical Armenia's population never exceeded 5 or 6 million, citing factors such as army size, tax records, and the region's largely uninhabitable terrain.

Ruben L. Manaseryan estimated the population of the short-lived empire of Tigranes the Great (r. 95 – 55 BC) at 10 million. Sedrak Krkyasharyan estimated over 10.5 million people in his empire, including around 4 million Armenians. Earlier estimates by non-historians such as Jacques de Morgan, Isaac Don Levine and Bodil Biørn put it considerably higher, at 25 and 30 million. Hakob Manandian posited that the population of Armenia during the reigns of Artaxias I and Tigranes II was "much larger than that of later centuries."

Agathangelos wrote that during the Christianization of Armenia in the early fourth century more than 4,000,000 men, women and children and more than 150,000 soldiers (a total of 4,150,000) were baptized by Gregory the Illuminator. Malachia Ormanian and Antranig Chalabian accepted the figure, while Edmond Schütz found the figure for the population of Greater Armenia “obviously exaggerated.” Suren Yeremian proposed 4 million as the population of both Arsacid Armenia and of Armenians.

Yeremian estimated the population of Sasanian Armenia (Marzpanate), in the 5th to 7th centuries, at around 3 million.

Based on tax records, Arsen Shahinyan estimated the population of Arminiya, an administrative unit of the Abbasid Caliphate, in the 8th and 9th centuries at 1.5 million, including 750,000 in Arminiya I (Greater Armenia), around 650,000 in Arminiya II (Arran, i.e. Caucasian Albania), and around 100,000 in Arminiya III (Jurzan, i.e. Eastern Georgia).

Serob Poghosyan estimated Armenia's population in the 9th–11th centuries, when much of it was ruled by the Bagratids, at 5 to 6 million. Kersam Aharonian proposed at least six million by the early 1000s, prior to the Seljuk invasions. Mikayel Malkhasyan estimated Vaspurakan's population in the same period at no less than a million people.

Tadevos Hakobyan suggested that Armenia's population reached 5 to 6 million only in the 13th century, prior to the Mongol invasion, when he estimated 4.5 million people in rural areas and around 500,000 in cities. Others have estimated Armenia's population in the mid-13th century at 4 million. Based on tax records, Manandian estimated the combined population of eastern Armenia, Kars and eastern Georgia (Kartli and Kakheti) in the mid-13th century at 4 to 5 million.

Modern Armenian scholars believe that the medieval Armenian Kingdom of Cilicia had a population of around one million, most of whom were Armenians.

== 19th and early 20th century ==
=== Estimates ===
Various 19th century scholars, both Western and Armenian, provided estimates for the global Armenian population, with the majority of estimates clustering around 4–5 million.

Russian historian Vladimir Kabuzan (1996) estimated up to 2 million Armenians worldwide by the early 19th century, including 1.6 million in Turkey (including about 100,000 in the European part); about 70,000 in Persia; 3,000 in Egypt, 2,500 in Afghanistan; nearly 13,000 in the Austrian Empire (including 5,800 in Galicia, 1,000 in Hungary, and 5,500 in Transylvania). Of the 133,000 Armenians in the Russian Empire, 107,000 lived in the Transcaucasus before the Russo-Persian War of 1826–28 and Russo-Turkish War of 1828–29. By the 1860s, more than 530,000 Armenians lived in the Russian Empire, of whom nearly 480,000 were in Transcaucasia.

German traveler August von Haxthausen quoted Catholicos Nerses V (then archbishop) as having told him in 1843 that he can assert with confidence the existence of more than eight million Armenians worldwide, including 30,000 Catholic Armenians in the Russian Caucasus.

In 1847 the Scottish missionary John Wilson estimated the total Armenian population at 2.5 million, with 1 million in the Russian Empire, 1 million in the Ottoman Empire and 0.5 million in Persia and "other distant lands." He quoted the figures provided by Lucas Balthazar, the "intelligent editor" of the Smyrna-based Armenian newspaper The Dawn of Ararat, (Note: Ղուկաս Պալդազարեան of «Արշալոյս Արարատեան», Arshaluys Araratian) who estimated 5 million Armenians overall, with 2 million in Russia, 2 million in Turkey and 1 million in Persia, India and elsewhere.

The 9th edition of the Encyclopædia Britannica (1875) cited French scholar Édouard Dulaurier's estimates c. 1850: approximately four millions Armenians in the world, including 2,500,000 in the Ottoman Empire, 1,200,000 in the Russian Empire, 25,000 in the Austrian Empire, 150,000 in Persia and Azerbaijan, 25,000 in continental India and the Archipelago of Asia, and the remainder of 100,000 scattered in various countries.

Richard Robert Madden wrote in 1862 that the Armenian population worldwide is estimated at 4 million, of whom an estimated 2,400,000 in the Ottoman Empire ("an approximate computation, and probably below the truth"), 900,000 in the Russian Empire, 600,000 in Persia, 40,000 in India and "other realms of Asia", and 60,000 in "various European countries."

In 1876 John Buchan Telfer, quoted the figures provided by Garabed Ghazarosian in his 1873 The Universal Year Book, which estimated a total of 4.2 million Armenians worldwide, including 2.5 million in Turkish dominions, 1.5 million in Russia, 34,000 in Persia, 14,600 in Austria, 15,000 in England, India and other British possessions, 8,400 in Romania, 8,000 in Egypt, and 120,000 in other countries. In 1891, Telfer reported to the Royal Society of Arts that "most authorities" appear to agree that the total Armenian population worldwide amounts to around 5 million, with most "scattered in their own land and in adjoining territories" and nearly half a million "settled in distant parts."

In 1891 Élisée Reclus wrote that while "usually estimated at three and even four millions," the total number of Armenians "would seem scarcely to exceed two millions." He estimated the "probable" number of Armenians as follows: 840,000 in Caucasia and European Russia, 760,000 in Asiatic Turkey, and 250,000 in European Turkey, 150,000 in Persia, and 60,000 elsewhere, with the total at 2,060,000. He estimated no less than 200,000 Armenians in Constantinople and noted that Tiflis held the second largest Armenian population of any city.

At the 1893 Parliament of the World's Religions, Armenian activist Minas Tcheraz claimed that there were 5.1 million Armenians in total, including 80,000 Catholics and 20,000 Protestants.

Russian-Armenian historian Alexei Dzhivelegov, writing for the Brockhaus and Efron Encyclopedic Dictionary (1911) estimated the total number of Armenians "somewhat under 3 million", including around 1,212,000 in Russia, 1,144,000 in Turkey ("at least prior to the massacres"), 100,000 in Persia, 5,000 in India and Africa each, around 20,000 in Hungary and Galicia, and several thousand in other European states.

Adrian Fortescue wrote in 1916: "There are said to be about three and a half or four million Armenians in the world—1,300,000 in Turkey, 1,200,000 in Russia, 50,000 in Persia, and the rest dispersed throughout the world. Of these about three quarters belong to the Monophysite ("Gregorian") Church."

=== Ormanian (1911) ===
Malachia Ormanian, a scholar and former Armenian Patriarch of Constantinople, estimated the population of Christian Armenians by the dioceses of the Armenian Apostolic Church in his 1911 book The Church of Armenia. It is the most detailed population distribution estimates available prior to the Armenian genocide. Robert Hewsen wrote that "Ormanian's figures appear moderate and reasonable, although this does not necessarily make them precise." Levon Marashlian notes that "the purpose of Ormanian's book was not to provide comprehensive population statistics" and that "his numbers for [Armenian] Protestants and Catholics may be even more incomplete" than for Armenian Apostolics.

Country/territory	Armenians
Ottoman Empire	1,709,550
Russian Empire	1,579,500
Persia	83,400
United States	50,000
Western Europe ( (United Kingdom) Great Britain, France, Belgium, Switzerland)	21,000
Bulgaria	20,000
Egypt	15,500
Romania	10,000
Austria-Hungary	9,000
India and Indochina	6,000
(Netherlands) Dutch East Indies	4,000
Greece	1,000
Total	3,508,950

=== Russian Empire ===
According to the Armenian Soviet Encyclopedia, what is now Armenia (historically known as Eastern Armenia) that came under Russian rule in 1828, had a population of 161,700 in 1831, which rose to 1.01 million by 1913.

According to the Russian Empire census of 1897, there were 1,173,096 native speakers of Armenian in the empire. The religious statistics indicated 1,179,241 Armenian Apostolics ("Gregorians") and 38,840 Catholic Armenians, amounting to a total of 1,218,081. According to official estimates for 1916, published in the Kavkazskiy kalendar, 1,859,663 Armenians lived in Russia's Caucasus Viceroyalty alone. Estimates by John Foster Fraser (1907) and Richard G. Hovannisian (2005) put the number of Armenians within the Russian Empire in the early 20th century at around 2 million. According to official estimates, 1,988,700 Armenians lived in the Russian Empire by 1916.

== Post-genocide ==
=== 1922 ===
The United States Department of State summarized the populations of Armenians in a November 1922 document entitled "Approximate number of Armenians in the world" (NARA 867.4016/816). Of the total 3,004,000 Armenians, 817,873 were refugees from Turkey "based upon information furnished by the British Embassy, Constantinople, and by the agents of the Near East Relief Society, in 1921. The total given does not include the able-bodied Armenians, who are retained by the Kemalists, nor the women and children,—approximately 95,000,—according to the League of Nations-who have been forced to embrace Islam."

Country	Armenians
Soviet Union	2,195,000
— Armenian SSR	1,200,000
— Georgian SSR	400,000
— Azerbaijan SSR	340,000
— Transcaspia	30,000
— rest of Soviet Russia	225,000
Ottoman Empire	281,000
United States and Canada	125,000
Syria, Palestine and Mesopotamia	104,000
Greece and Cyprus	79,000
Persia	50,000
Bulgaria	46,000
Romania	43,000
Central and Western Europe	38,000
Egypt, Sudan and Abyssinia	28,000
India, (Netherlands) Java and Australia	12,000
Argentina	3,000
Total	3,004,000

=== 1923 ===
Country / Continent	Region	Armenians
USSR	Armenian SSR	743,571
USSR	Nagorno-Karabakh	111,694
USSR	Other parts	712,303
British Empire	Egypt, Sudan, Habeshistan	28,000
British Empire	India	1,500
Europe	Greece	150,000
Europe	Bulgaria	52,000
Europe	France	45,000
Europe	Romania	45,000
Europe	Cyprus	5,700
Americas	USA, Canada	125,000
Americas	Brazil, Uruguay, Argentina	15,000
Asia	Turkey	281,000
Asia	Syria, Lebanon	150,000
Asia	Persia	100,000
Asia	Iraq	15,000
Asia	China	1,000
TOTAL		2,581,768

=== Mid-century ===
The 1952 book Langues du monde estimated 3,400,000 Armenians (Armenian-speakers) globally.

Suren Yeremian, in an entry for the Great Soviet Encyclopedia, estimated 5.2 million Armenians globally, with 3.4 million in the Soviet Union and 1.8 million abroad by the mid-1960s.

1966

The following estimates were originally published on 4 December 1966 in the Yerevan-based weekly Hayreniki dzayn («Հայրենիքի ձայն») of Soviet Armenia's Committee for Cultural Relations with Armenians Abroad. They were cited by Richard Hrair Dekmejian in Soviet Studies in 1968, and by David Marshall Lang and Christopher J. Walker in 1976 in Minority Rights Group's entry on Armenians.

Country	Armenians
Soviet Union	3,500,000
— Armenian SSR	2,000,000
— Azerbaijani SSR	560,000
— Georgian SSR	550,000
— Russian SFSR	330,000
— rest of USSR	60,000
United States and Canada	450,000
Turkey	250,000
Iran	200,000
France	200,000
Lebanon	180,000
Syria	150,000
rest of the world	570,000
Total	5,500,000

=== 1986 ===
Armenian Soviet Encyclopedia, Volume XIII ("Soviet Armenia"), 1987

Country	Armenians
Soviet Union	4,500,000
Armenian SSR	2,755,000 (Note: 89.7% of 3,072,000 (as of 1979))
Azerbaijani SSR	475,000
Georgian SSR	448,000
Russian SFSR	365,000
Outside the USSR	2,300,000
United States	800,000
France	350,000
Lebanon	200,000
Iran	200,000
Turkey	180,000 (Note: "Additionally, over 1,000,000 Islamized Armenians")
Syria	120,000
Argentina	75,000
Canada	55,000
Bulgaria	25,000
Iraq	25,000
Australia	25,000
Brazil	22,000

Country	Armenians
Uruguay	14,000
England	12,000
Kuwait	11,000
Egypt	10,000
Greece	10,000
Romania	5,000
Belgium	5,000
Switzerland	5,000
UAE	5,000
Jordan	4,000
Netherlands	3,000
Venezuela	2,500
Cyprus	2,000
Jerusalem	2,000
Italy	2,000
Sudan	1,000
Ethiopia	800
India	500
Total	7,000,000

== 21st century ==
=== 2012 ===
Armenia Encyclopedia, 2012

Country	Armenians
Russia	2,250,000–2,500,000
United States	1,000,000–1,500,000
France	500,000–600,000
Georgia	250,000–400,000
Ukraine	130,000
Poland	92,000
Turkey	80,000
Iran	70,000–80,000
Lebanon	70,000–80,000
Greece	70,000–80,000
Syria	65,000–70,000
Argentina	70,000
Canada	60,000–65,000
Germany	50,000–60,000
Uzbekistan	50,000
Bulgaria	50,000
Spain	45,000–80,000
Brazil	35,000–40,000
Turkmenistan	30,000
Belarus	30,000
Kazakhstan	25,000
Israel	21,000
Iraq	20,000
Uruguay	20,000
UK	18,000

Country	Armenians
Hungary	15,000
Netherlands	12,000
Belgium	10,000
Czechia	10,000
Egypt	8,500
Switzerland	5,000
Sweden	5,000–6,000
Kuwait	5,000
Austria	4,000
Venezuela	3,500
Moldova	2,000–4,000
Jordan	3,000
Tajikistan	3,000
Latvia	3,000
Kyrgyzstan	3,000
Cyprus	3,000–3,500
Italy	3,000
Lithuania	2,500
UAE	2,000
Estonia	2,000
Romania	2,000
Chile	1,600
Ecuador	1,500
Finland	1,000
Norway	1,000

Country	Armenians
Albania	500–700
Mexico	560
Bahrain	400
South Africa	300
Malta	300
New Zealand	200
Portugal	200
Colombia	200
Monaco	200
India	200
Ireland	150
Ethiopia	100
Dominican Republic	80
Nigeria	60
China	50–60
Japan	50–60
Singapore	50
Costa Rica	40
Peru	40
Zimbabwe	30
South Korea	25
Zambia	20
Iceland	20
Luxembourg	10

== Previous censuses ==
=== By country ===
Soviet statistics from 1926 to 1989 for the former Soviet republics are given below and not repeated in this table.

Country/territory (Note: Non-UN member states are indicated in italics.)	Ethnic Armenians	People born in Armenia (of any ethnicity)
Armenia	3,145,354 (2001 census); 2,961,801 (2011 census)	2,927,306 (2001 census); 2,821,026 (2011 census)
Russia	1,130,491 (2002 census); 1,182,388 (2010 census)	481,328 (2002 census); 511,150 (2010 census)
United States	212,621 (1980 census); 308,096 (1990 census); 385,488 (2000 census); 474,559 (2010 ACS)	36,628 (1920 census); 32,166 (1930 census); 65,280 (2000 census); 89,261 (2010 ACS)
Georgia	248,929 (2002 census); 168,102 (2014 census)	9,158 (2014 census)
Artsakh (Note: Artsakh/Nagorno-Karabakh Republic is a disputed area. It is de facto independent, but is internationally recognized as part of Azerbaijan.)	137,380 (2005 census); 144,683 (2015 census)	14,676 (2005 census); 16,335 (2015 census)
Canada	37,500 (1996 census); 40,505 (2001 census); 50,500 (2006 census); 55,740 (2011 census); 63,810 (2016 census)	2,195 (2006 census); 4,165 (2016 census)
Turkey	77,000 (1927 census); 61,000 (1935 census); 60,000 (1945 census); 60,000 (1955 census)	
Abkhazia (Note: The political status of Abkhazia is disputed. Having unilaterally declared independence from Georgia in 1992, Abkhazia is formally recognised as an independent state by 4 UN member states (three other states previously recognised it but then withdrew their recognition), while the remainder of the international community recognizes it as de jure Georgian territory. Georgia continues to claim the area as its own territory, designating it as Russian-occupied territory.)	44,869 (2003 census); 41,906 (2011 census)	
Australia	14,667 (2001 census); 15,761 (2006 census); 16,698 (2011 census); 19,247 (2016 census)	1,159 (2016 census)
Kazakhstan	14,758 (1999 census); 13,776 (2009 census)	
Bulgaria	13,677 (1992 census); 10,832 (2001 census); 6,552 (2011 census)	
Romania	12,175 (1930 census); 6,441 (1956 census); 3,436 (1966 census); 2,342 (1977 census); 1,957 (1992 census); 1,780 (2002 census); 1,361 (2011 census)	
Belarus	10,191 (1999 census); 8,512 (2009 census); 9,392 (2019 census)	
Cyprus	1,197 (1921 census); 3,377 (1931 census); 3,962 (1946 census); 3,378 (1960 census); 1,831 (2011 census) (Note: Cypriot citizens only)	
Poland	1,082 (2002 census); 3,000 (2011 census)	
Latvia	83 (1935 census); 2,644 (2000 census); 2,632 (2011 census)	
Lithuania	1,477 (2001 census); 1,233 (2011 census)	
Hungary	1,165 (2001 census); 3,571 (2011 census)	
Tajikistan	995 (2000 census); 434 (2010 census)	
New Zealand	228 (2013 census); 276 (2018 census)	

=== Former countries and territories ===
Country/territory	Ethnic Armenians	People born in Armenia
Lebanese Republic	31,992 (1932 census)	
Hatay State	24,911 (1936 census)	
Kingdom of Egypt	17,188 (1927 census)	
(United Kingdom) Mandatory Palestine	3,210 (1922 census); 3,524 (1931 census)	
British India	1,705 (1911 census)	40 (1911 census)
(United Kingdom) British Singapore	16 (1824 census); 19 (1826 census); 34 (1836 census); 81 (1931 census)	

==== Soviet republics (1926–1989) ====
Precise figures are available for the number of Armenians in the Soviet Union and its constituent republics because all censuses in the USSR enumerated people by ethnicity.

Republic	1926	1939	1959	1970	1979	1989	Born in ArmSSR (1989)
Soviet Union	1,567,568	2,152,860	2,786,912	3,559,151	4,151,241	4,623,232	2,971,930
Armenian SSR	743,571	1,061,997	1,551,610	2,208,327	2,724,975	3,083,616	2,570,422
Azerbaijan SSR	282,004	388,025	442,089	483,520	475,486	390,505	137,027
↳ NKAO	111,694	132,800	110,053	121,068	123,076	145,450	2,834
Georgian SSR	313,741	415,013	442,916	452,309	448,000	437,211	37,742
↳ Abkhazia	13,477	49,705	64,425	74,850	73,350	76,541	3,078
Russian SFSR	195,410	218,156	255,978	298,718	364,570	532,390	151,484
Uzbek SSR	14,976	20,394	27,370	34,470	42,374	50,537	12,280
Ukrainian SSR	10,631	21,688	28,024	33,439	38,646	54,200	36,498
Turkmen SSR	13,859	15,996	19,696	23,054	26,605	31,829	4,436
Kazakh SSR		7,777	9,284	12,518	14,022	19,119	10,756
Tajik SSR		1,272	2,878	3,787	4,861	5,651	2,302
Kirghiz SSR		728	1,919	2,688	3,285	3,975	1,701
Byelorussian SSR	99	1,814	1,751	2,362	2,751	4,933	2,912
Moldavian SSR			1,218	1,336	1,953	2,873	1,318
Latvian SSR			1,060	1,511	1,913	3,069	1,399
Lithuanian SSR			471	508	955	1,655	895
Estonian SSR			648	604	845	1,669	758

== By city ==
Default sorted by Armenian population size

=== 1932 ===
cities with the largest Armenian populations (1932)

Rank	City	Country	Armenians
1	Tiflis	Soviet Union	130,000
2	Yerevan	Soviet Union	106,000
3	Baku	Soviet Union	90,000
4	Istanbul	Turkey	65,000
5	Leninakan	Soviet Union	58,000
6	Aleppo	Syria	50,000

=== Russian Empire (1897 & 1916) ===
1897 census
All towns within the Russian Empire with more than 5,000 Armenians

City	Pop	Armenians	% Arm.	Ref
Tiflis (Tbilisi)	159,590	47,133	29.5%	
Rostov-on-Don (Note: Rostovsky okrug of Don Host Oblast, including Nakhichevan-on-Don, essentially part of a single urban area.)	369,732	25,604	6.9%	
Aleksandropol (Gyumri)	30,616	21,771	71.1%	
Baku	111,904	19,099	17.1%	
Shusha	25,881	14,420	55.7%	
Erivan (Yerevan)	29,006	12,523	43.2%	
Yelisavetpol (Ganja)	33,625	12,055	35.9%	
Kars	20,805	10,332	49.7%	
Akhaltsikhe	15,357	9,035	58.8%	
Novobayazet (Gavar)	8,486	8,094	95.4%	
Batumi	28,508	6,839	24.0%	
Echmiadzin	5,267	4,996	94.9%	

1916 Kavkazskiy kalendar
Largest Armenian-populated towns in the Caucasus Viceroyalty

City	Pop	Armenians	% Arm.
Tiflis (Tbilisi)	346,766	149,294	43.1%
Baku	262,422	62,357	23.8%
Aleksandropol (Gyumri)	51,874	45,446	87.6%
Erivan (Yerevan)	51,286	37,223	72.6%
Kars	30,514	25,665	84.1%
Shusha	43,869	23,396	53.3%
Akhaltsikhe	25,470	18,165	71.3%
Novobayazet (Gavar)	14,748	14,350	97.3%
Yelisavetpol (Ganja)	57,731	12,125	21.0%
Akhalkalaki	7,055	6,151	87.2%
Batumi	20,020	5,524	27.6%
Artvin	6,997	5,451	77.9%
Nakhichevan	8,934	2,665	29.8%

=== Soviet Union ===
1926 census
Only cities in the Transcaucasian SFSR (South Caucasus) are listed

City	Republic	Pop	Armenians	% Arm.	Ref
Tiflis	Georgia	294,044	100,148	34.1%	
Baku	Azerbaijan	453,333	76,656	16.9%	
Erivan	Armenia	67,121	59,838	89.2%	
Leninakan	Armenia	42,313	37,520	88.7%	
Elisabethpol	Azerbaijan	57,393	16,148	28.1%	
Batum	Georgia	48,474	10,233	21.1%	
Nor-Bayazet	Armenia	8,447	8,408	99.5%	
Vagharshapat	Armenia	8,436	8,359	99.1%	

1959 census
Select cities, including the 3 largest cities in Armenian SSR

City	Republic	Pop	Armenians	% Arm.	Ref
Yerevan	Armenia	509,340	473,742	93.0%	
Tbilisi	Georgia	694,664	149,258	21.5%	
Baku	Azerbaijan	642,507	137,111	21.3%	
Leninakan	Armenia	108,446	100,960	93.1%	
Kirovakan	Armenia	49,423			
Kirovabad	Azerbaijan	138,239	37,462	27.1%	
Moscow	Russia	5,085,581	18,379	0.4%	
Stepanakert	Azerbaijan	19,703	17,640	89.5%	
Batum	Georgia	82,328	12,743	15.5%	
Tashkent	Uzbekistan	911,930	10,500	1.2%	

1979 census
Select cities

City	Republic	Pop	Armenians	% Arm.	Ref
Yerevan	Armenia	1,030,969	986,812	95.7%	
Baku	Azerbaijan	1,533,235	215,807	14.1%	
Leninakan	Armenia	206,613			
Tbilisi	Georgia	1,056,140	152,900	14.5%	
Kirovakan	Armenia	146,036			
Kirovabad	Azerbaijan	231,691	40,741	17.6%	
Stepanakert	Azerbaijan	38,948	33,898	87.0%	
Moscow	Russia	7,931,602	31,414	0.4%	
Tashkent	Uzbekistan	1,759,419	16,692	0.9%	
Ashgabat	Turkmenistan	311,644	14,195	4.6%	
Batumi	Georgia	122,292	13,936	11.4%	
Sumgait	Azerbaijan	205,694	13,818	6.7%	
Akhalkalaki	Georgia	13,224	11,879	89.8%	
Sukhumi	Georgia	108,337	11,823	10.9%	
Akhaltsikhe	Georgia	19,587	10,278	52.5%	
Leningrad	Russia	4,568,548	7,995	0.2%	
Rustavi	Georgia	129,459	6,707	5.2%	

== See also ==
- Armenian diaspora
- Demographics of Armenia
- Estimates of historical world population
- Historical Jewish population
