= Armenians in the United Arab Emirates =

Total population
- 5,000

Regions with significant populations
- Abu Dhabi, Dubai, Sharjah

Languages
- Armenian • Arabic

Religion
- Armenian Apostolic Church

Armenians in United Arab Emirates refers to ethnic Armenians living in the United Arab Emirates. They number around 5,000.

The Armenians live mainly in Dubai, Sharjah and Abu Dhabi

== Migration history ==
Many Armenians originating from Lebanon, Syria and other Arab countries were attracted by the economic opportunities provided by the UAE, and they came to the UAE for jobs. Although there are no clear statistics and their numbers vary, over time their number has increased to around 3,000. Recently there are also economic migrants coming from Armenia and Armenians from Russia.

== Religion ==
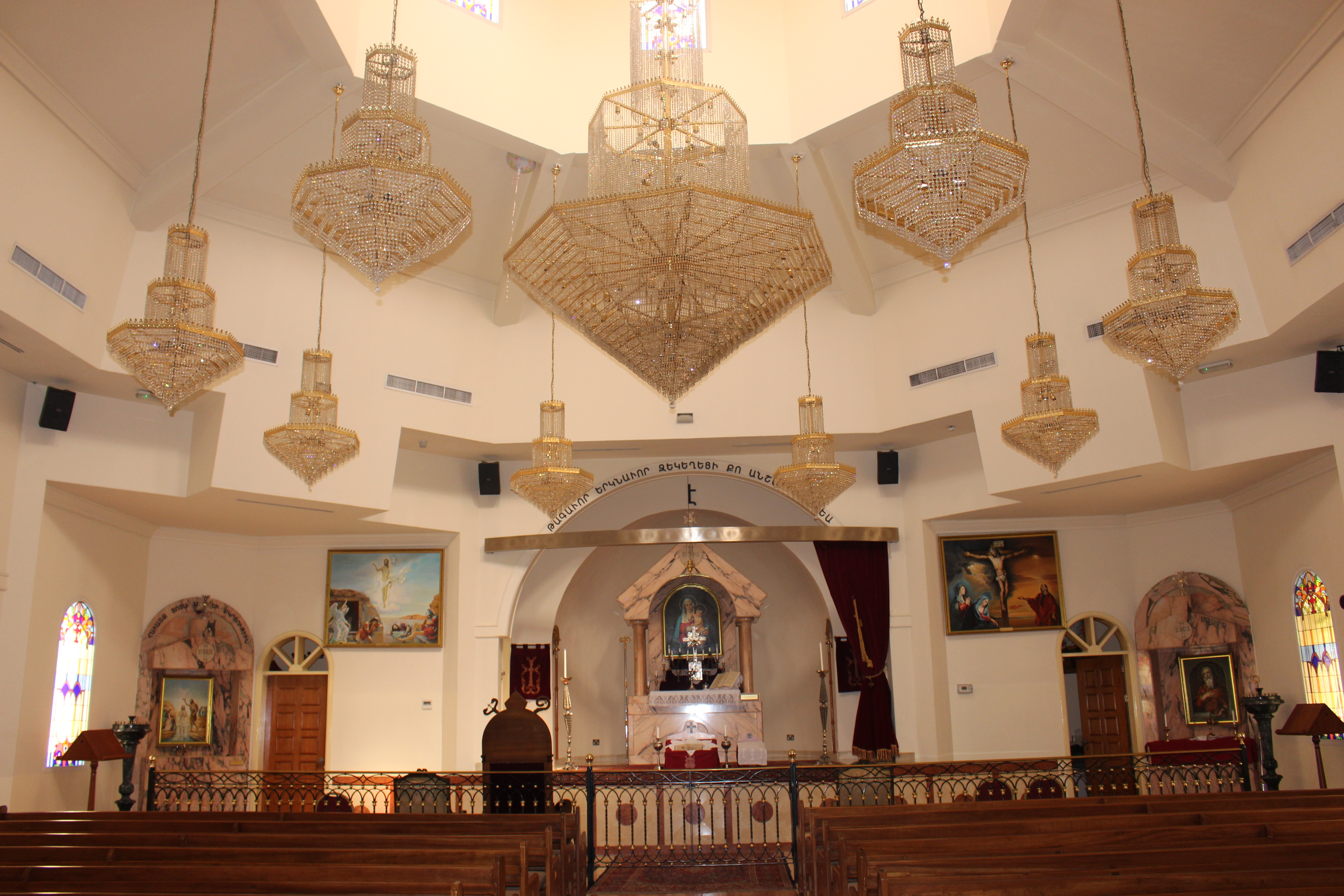
Saint Gregory the Illuminator Armenian Apostolic church in Sharjah.

The majority of the Armenians in the United Arab Emirates are Armenian Apostolics (Orthodox Armenians) belonging to the Armenian Apostolic Church and under the jurisdiction of the Holy See of Cilicia.

The Catholicossate of the Great House of Cilicia (also known as the Holy See of Cilicia) has established the "Diocese of Kuwait and the Arabian Gulf Countries" headquartered in Kuwait, but also serving the Armenians in the Persian Gulf including UAE.

The Armenian Catholicossate, with the authorization and financial support of the Sharjah Emirate, established the St. Gregory the Illuminator Church (in Armenian Sourp Krikor Lousavoritch Hye Arakelagan Yegeghetsi) in Al Yarmook, Sharjah, thus becoming the first ever Armenian church established in the United Arab Emirates.

The Catholicos Representative of the Diocese is Bishop Mesrob Sarkissian who also represents the Armenian population of Qatar. Reverend Aram Dekermendjian is the parish Priest of the Armenian Community in Sharjah and in the capital of Abu Dhabi, Bishop Vache Balekjian.

== See also ==
- Armenia–United Arab Emirates relations
- Armenian diaspora
- Armenians in the Middle East
- Expatriates in the United Arab Emirates
