= Armenians in Malta =

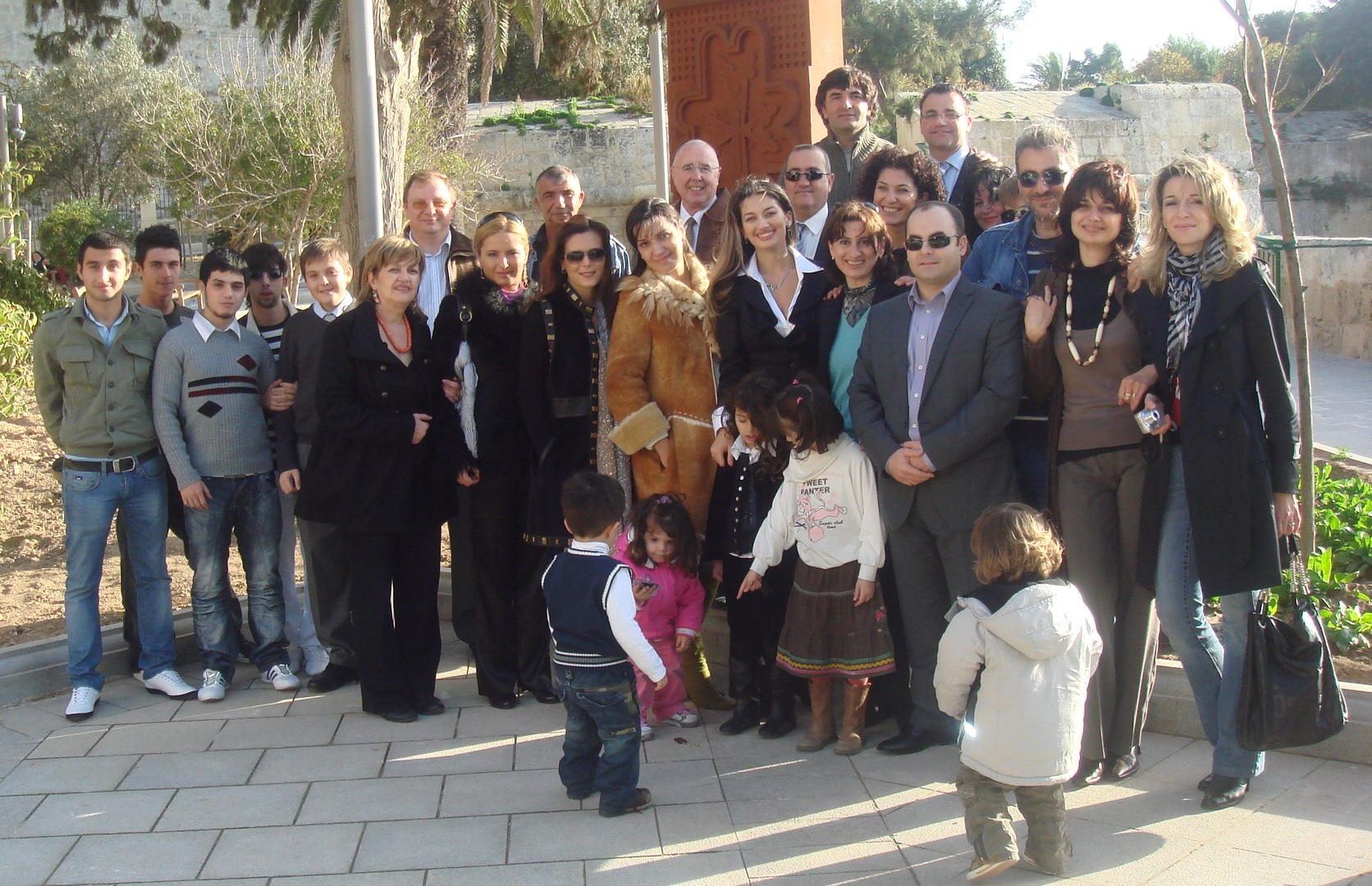
- Armenian Diaspora of Malta at Hastings Gardens

Regions with significant populations
- Valletta, Qrendi: c. 500

Languages
- Armenian, English, Maltese

Religion
- Armenian Apostolic or none

Related ethnic groups
- Armenian diaspora Armenians in Cyprus, Armenians in Greece, Armenians in Italy

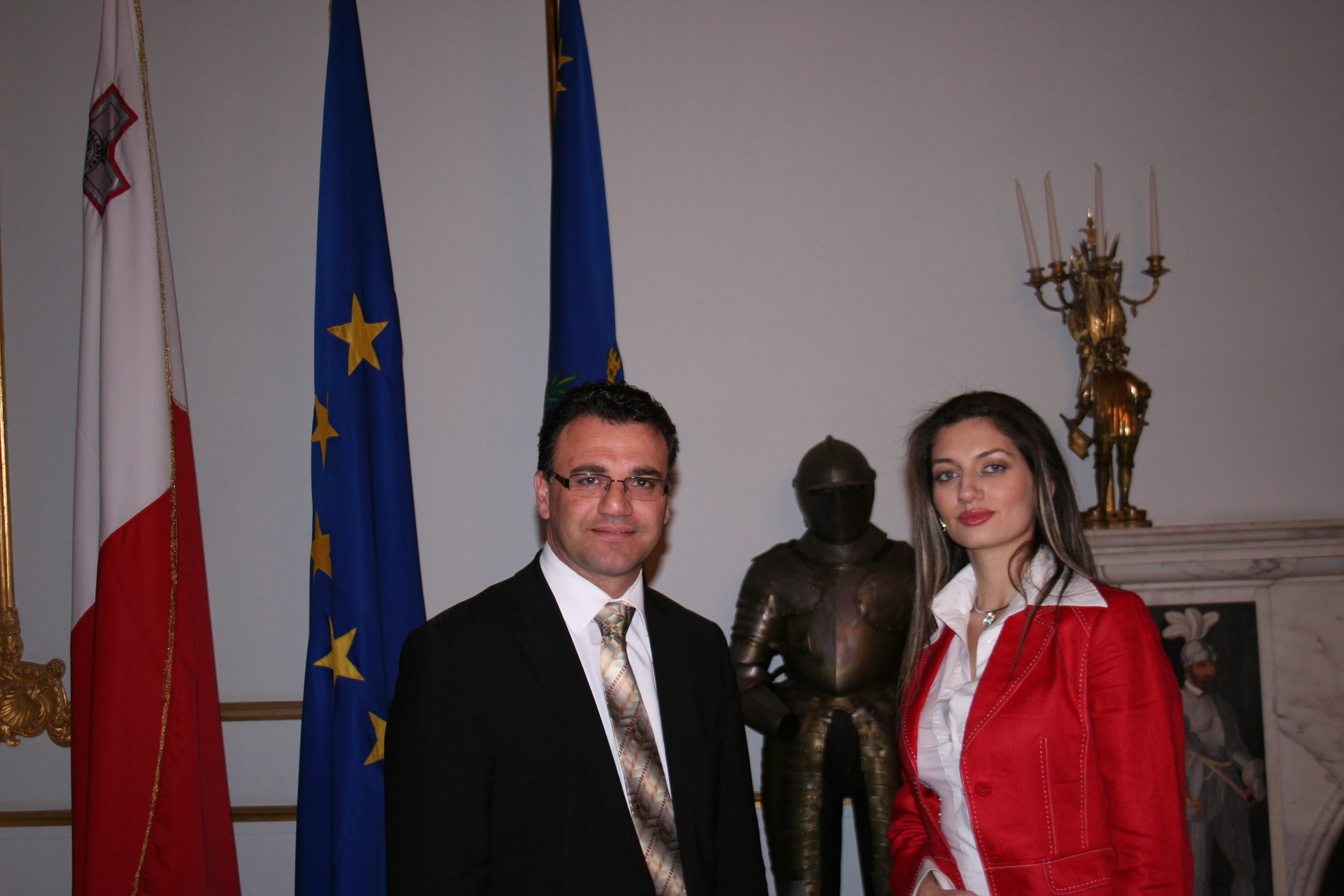
Chairperson of the Armenian Community of Malta Vera Boyajyan and Maltese Parliament MP David Agius

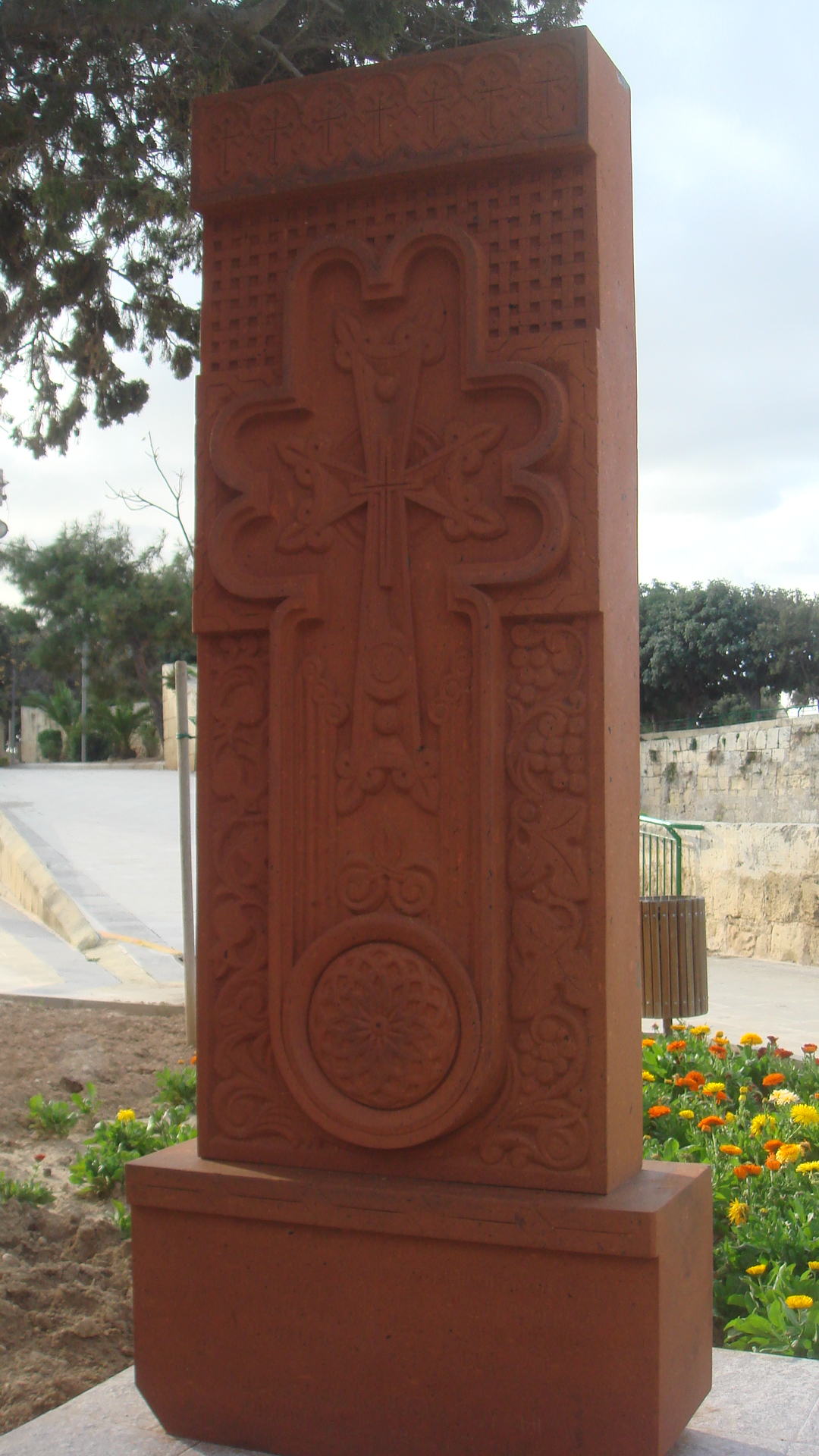
Khachqar in Valletta, Malta, installed on December 22, 2009 form Ashot and Vera Boyajyans and Armenian Community of Malta

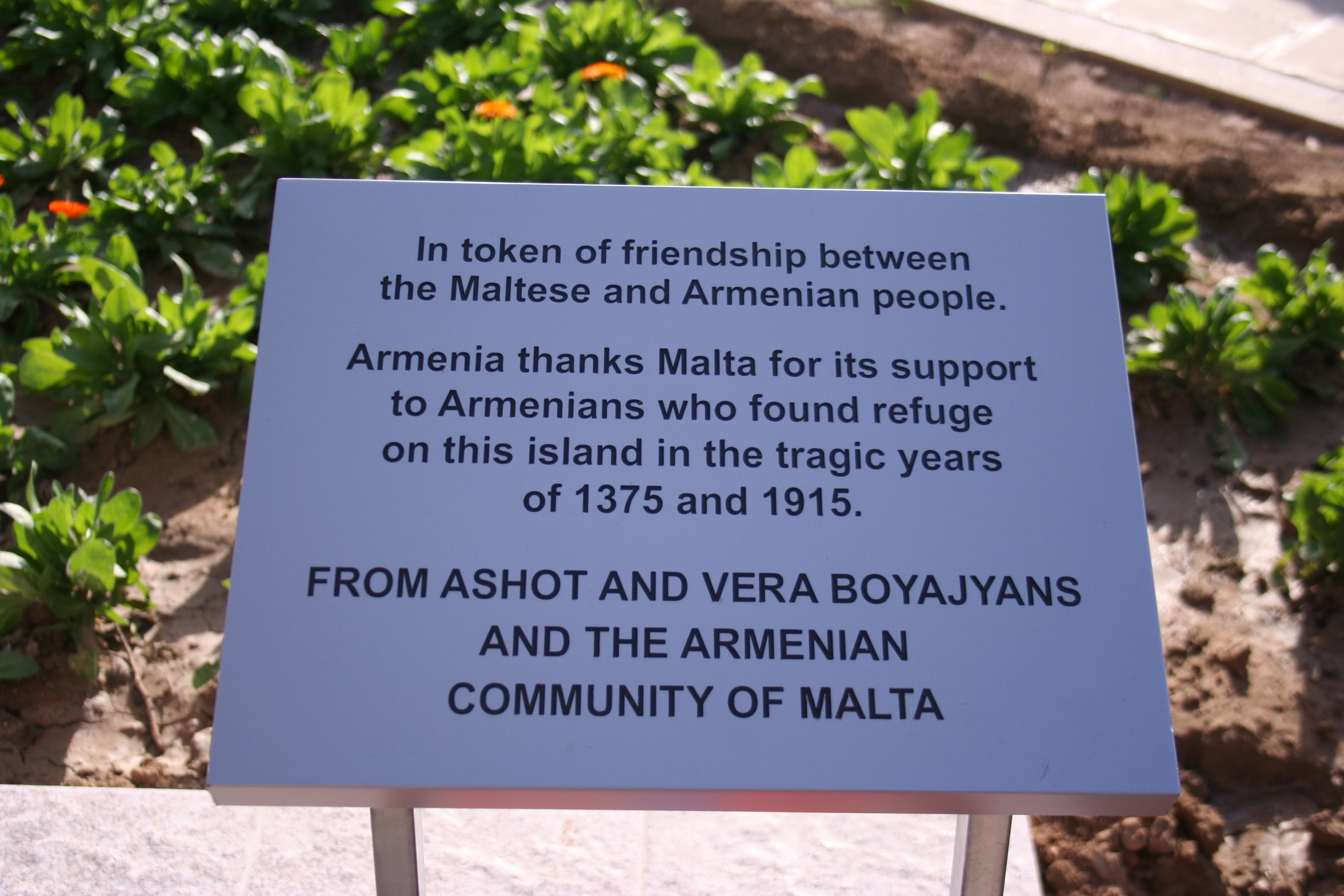

The Armenians in Malta are a community of the Armenian diaspora living on the islands of Malta. There are thousands Maltese of Armenian descent, but only some 400-500 identify as Armenians. The rest are assimilated with the locals and consider themselves Maltese. The surnames and documents, saved in their family archives, are indicative of their Armenian origin. The interests of the Armenian Diaspora in Malta are represented by the Armenian Community of Malta.

Notable Maltese of Armenian descent include Mikhail Basmadjian (actor), and Andy Eminyan (retired footballer).

== History ==
The relationship of the Armenian Kingdom with the Knights Hospitaller (later the Sovereign Military Order of Malta) has very ancient roots and started in 1097. The knights became a land owner beginning with the year 1149. In 1163 the Order was granted a castle around Mamestia and two castles in Selevkia under Leo II, King of Armenia. The Order was present in Cilicia until 1375. Many Armenian knights and ordinary citizens resettled on Malta after the collapse of Armenian Kingdom in 1375.

The second mass resettlement of the Armenians in Malta took place after the Armenian genocide in 1915 in the Ottoman Empire, and the third resettlement was at the end of the 1990s after the collapse of the USSR. Basic part of the migrants later moved to the countries of Continental Europe.

One of the historical examples of the presence of Armenians on Malta is the Church of Our Lady of Liesse built by means of the funds provided by the Bali of Armenia, Fra Giacomo Chenn de Bellay, one of the descendants of the Luzinian family.

== Armenian Community of Malta ==
Armenian Community of Malta is a public organization based on self-administration that acts in accordance with the Constitution of Republic of Malta and current legislation of the republic. The members of the Community are Armenians and their family members (Malta residents) united on a voluntary basis. The Community operates on the territory of Malta and EU; is a legal body and has its own logo.

The Armenian Community of Malta was registered in the List of Voluntary Organisations, approved by the government, on the 10th of July 2009. The first Congress of the Armenians took place on 31 of July 2009 in Hilton Hotels. The organization management was asserted during the Congress. The Chairperson of the Community became Vera Boyajyan.

=== Goals and Objectives ===
The goal of the Community is to unite the efforts of the Armenians, aimed at preservation and development of Armenian culture and language; protection rights and interests of its members; strengthening the friendship between the Armenian and Maltese people. To reach its goals the Community contributes to publishing and distributing of literature promoting the achievements of the Armenian cultural centers, organizes seminars, conferences, exhibitions, takes part in such activities itself; helps and assists the members of the Community in all the spheres of their activities within the framework of current Maltese legislation.

=== Structure ===
Superior body of the Community is Members’ Assembly summoned not less than once a year. The Assembly asserts the Board of Community, determines its numerical composition and elects Chairperson. Board of Community is formed by elected members of the community. Board of Community coordinates the activities of the members of the Community; elects from its members a deputy of Chairperson; organizes preparation and holding of Assembly as well as determines the ways of realization of decisions made at Assembly.

Chairperson of Community controls the current activity of Community, represents Community in relationship with various organizations, signs agreements, letters and applications on behalf of Community, has the power to sign all financial, legal, service and other documents; controls implementation of decisions of Board of Community; has the right to summon out-of-turn Assembly and Board of Community; possesses the right of casting vote in disputes while voting in sessions of Board of Community.

Inspection commission of Community exercises control of financial and economical activities of Community. Members of Board have no right to enter in Inspection commission.

=== Achievements ===
Shortly after the first Congress of Armenians on Malta Armenian Community of Malta fulfilled most of the missions formulated at the Congress.

On 22 December the unveiling of a Khachqar took place in the Hastings Gardens, near the entrance of the city of Valletta. The Khachqar was specially made for the purpose in Armenia and delivered to Malta. Members of Maltese Parliament, the Mayor of Valletta and other high-level guests were present at the ceremony. The memorial board at the Kahchqar says:

In token of friendship between the Maltese and Armenian people.
Armenia thanks Malta for its support to Armenians who found refuge in this island in the tragic years of 1375 and 1915

Another achievement of the Community is the initiation of formation of friendship group Armenia-Malta in the National Assembly of Armenia, as well as the formation of similar friendship group Malta-Armenia in the Parliament of Republic of Malta. The Community management made a decision to build Armenian Church on Malta as well as to install a monument to the first Catholicos of All Armenians Gregory the Illuminator.

Armenian Community of Malta is the only organization that represents interests of Armenians on Malta and gives legal support to its members. On the 24th of June the official website of the Community was launched in three languages: English, Armenian and Russian.

== See also ==
- Armenia–Malta relations
- Armenian diaspora
- Immigration to Malta

== Footnotes ==
- Official website
