= Rouben Azizian =

New Zealand political scientist

- Born: March 25, 1950 (age 76)

Academic background
- Education: Diplomatic Academy of the USSR MFA

Academic work
- Discipline: Political scientist
- Sub-discipline: Security studies, International relations
- Institutions: Massey University

Rouben Azizian is a New Zealand academic of Armenian descent. He specialises in security studies and international relations in the Asia–Pacific. He is currently a full professor at Massey University and head of the Auckland branch of the New Zealand Institute of International Affairs.

== Biography ==
Azizian acquired a Master of Arts degree at the Moscow State Institute of International Relations in 1972 and a PhD at the Diplomatic Academy of the USSR MFA in 1987.

Prior to becoming a full-time academic, Azizian worked as a Soviet (and later, Russian) diplomat. He was assigned to the missions in Nepal and Sri Lanka before he came to New Zealand in 1991 as a counsellor and deputy chief of mission at the Soviet embassy in Wellington. He quit his diplomatic career in 1994 but stayed in the country and started teaching at the Department of Political Studies at the University of Auckland.

Between 2002 and 2015, Azizian lectured and conducted research at the Asia-Pacific Center for Security Studies in Honolulu. He then returned to his New Zealand home to become the Director of Massey University's Centre for Defence and Security Studies. In 2019, he became the founding editor of New Zealand's first scholarly journal in his field, the National Security Journal.

In addition to his academic work, Azizian has appeared on numerous podcasts and interviews as an international relations commentator and foreign policy educator.

== Selected works ==
- Azizian, Rouben (2003). "A Marriage of Convenience: Russia and U.S. Foreign Policy". Asian Affairs: An American Review. 30 (2): 151–159. doi:10.1080/00927670309601525. S2CID 154211885.
- Azizian, Rouben (2006). "Islamic Radicalism in Kazakhstan and Kyrgyzstan". In Aldis, Anne; Herd, Graeme (eds.). The Ideological War on Terror: Worldwide Strategies for Counter-Terrorism. Routledge. pp. 81–95. doi:10.4324/9780203968420. ISBN 978-0-203-96842-0.
- Azizian, Rouben (2006). "Russia, America and New Conflicts in Central Asia". In Patman, Robert (ed.). Globalization and Conflict: National Security in a 'New' Strategic Era. Routledge. pp. 135–150. doi:10.4324/9780203007938. ISBN 978-0-203-00793-8.
- Azizian, Rouben; Bainazarova, Elnara (2012). "Eurasian Response to China's Rise: Russia and Kazakhstan in Search of Optimal China Policy". Asian Politics & Policy. 4 (3): 377–399. doi:10.1111/j.1943-0787.2012.01348.x.
- Azizian, Rouben; Johanson, Terry (2020). "Finding the Democratic Balance: Australian and New Zealand National Security Coordination". In Weinberg, Leonard; Francis, Elizabeth; Assoudeh, Eliot (eds.). Routledge Handbook of Democracy and Security. Routledge.
