= Armenians in Central Asia =

Ethnic group

Armenians in Central Asian states: Uzbekistan, Kazakhstan, Kyrgyzstan, Tajikistan and Turkmenistan, were mainly settled there during the Soviet era for various reasons.

== History ==
According to old historical records, Armenian warriors and traders once moved freely in many parts of Central Asia, often fighting alongside local warlords in return for trading privileges.

== Number ==
The following table shows the number of Armenians in each Central Asian country according to Soviet censuses from 1926 to 1989, and censuses taken place after the collapse of the Soviet Union.

Country	1926	1939	1959	1970	1979	1989	Post-Soviet (Year)	Latest (Year)	Estimates
Uzbekistan	14,976	20,394	27,370	34,470	42,374	50,537	42,359 (2000)		42,000
Turkmenistan	13,859	15,996	19,696	23,054	26,605	31,829	33,368 (1995)	22,000 (2010)	22,000
Kazakhstan	636	7,777	9,284	12,518	14,022	19,119	14,758 (1999)	13,776 (2009)	13,000
Tajikistan	171	1,272	2,878	3,787	4,861	5,651	995 (2000)	434 (2010)	400
Kyrgyzstan	278	728	1,919	2,688	3,285	3,975	1,364 (1999)	809 (2009)	800
TOTAL	29,920	46,167	61,147	76,517	91,147	111,111	94,977		78,000

== Countries ==
=== Turkmenistan ===
Armenians in Turkmenistan number anywhere from 30,000 to 34,000. According to the Soviet 1989 census there were 31,829 Armenians in Turkmenistan. Their history can be traced back to the Soviet days, particularly after World War II, when diaspora Armenians, encouraged to settle in the Armenian SSR were dispersed by the government across the Soviet Union. Today there are three main groups of Armenians living in the country: ethnic Armenians who are Turkmen citizens, Armenian refugees from Azerbaijan, and Armenian citizens from Armenia. Many Armenian nationals and refugees are no longer legally residents and are considered illegal due to a visa regime being implemented in 1999. Approximately 7,000 Turkmen Armenians are considered illegal. With the help of the Norwegian government and other organizations, several hundred of these Armenians were repatriated to Armenia. Most have moved on to live in Russia.

Notable people

- Boris Şyhmyradow, former Minister of Foreign Affairs of Turkmenistan

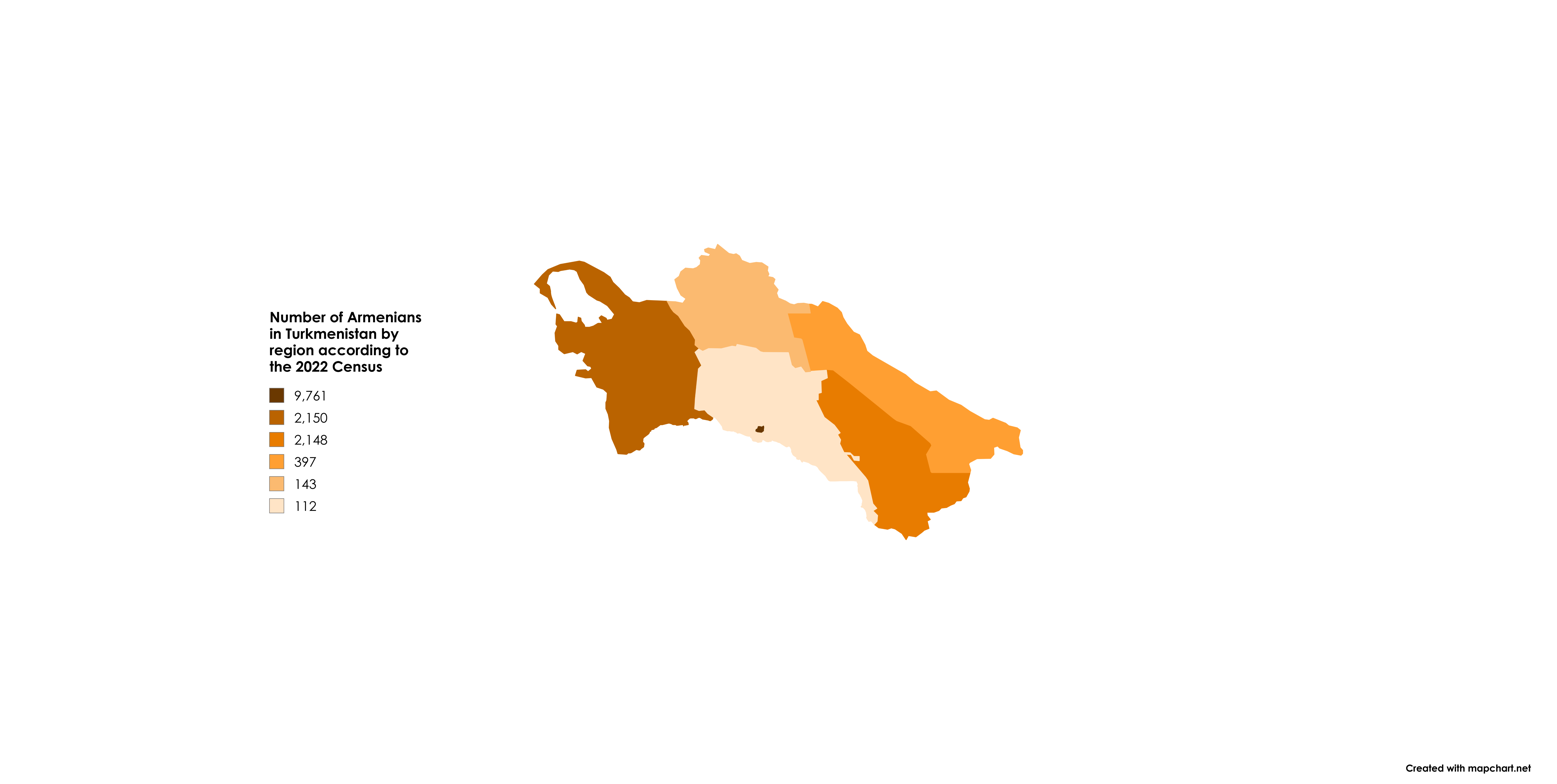
Number of Armenians in Turkmenistan by region

=== Kazakhstan ===
Armenians in Kazakhstan are ethnic Armenians living in the Republic of Kazakhstan. There are an estimated 25,000 Armenians living within the country today.

The first Armenians arrived in Kazakhstan in the 1860s when the Russian Empire, which already controlled Armenian-populated areas in the north Caucasus, moved to conquer the Kazakh Steppe. Immigrants from throughout the empire moved to the frontier, Armenians being among the first, acting as interpreters for the Russians (as many already spoke Turkic languages), consuls and businessmen for the emerging oil industry.

The first mass movement of Armenians into the country, however, occurred in 1937, in which almost 1,121 Armenian and Kurdish families were transplanted from the Azerbaijan SSR to the Kazakh SSR. During the reign of Joseph Stalin, in which forced migration was widely used as a political tool in order to keep vassal nations under control and avoid ethnic conflict, Armenians and many other groups were sent to Kazakhstan when it was found convenient. In 1948, roughly 5800 Armenians and Pontic Greeks from the Black Sea region were deported to southern Kazakhstan, for being suspected sympathizers of the Armenian Revolutionary Federation, an anti-Soviet political party. Earlier, in 1944, a number of the Armenian-derived Hamsheni were deported to Kazakhstan from parts of Georgia and other central Asian republics, among other groups. They would later petition the Soviet Government under Mikhail Gorbachev to move them to the Armenian SSR, but were turned down for fears they would spark conflicts with their Christian relatives.

=== Kyrgyzstan ===
Armenians in Kyrgyzstan form one of the country's smaller minority groups. The first Armenian, Shaverdov Mirkur, came to the area of the Turkestan Autonomous Soviet Socialist Republic which today comprises Kyrgyzstan in 1918; he was engaged in the hotel business. Another pair of early Armenians in Kyrgyzstan were the brothers Nikita and Sergei Bedrosov, whose nephew Emmanuel Simoyants managed the first soft drinks factory of the Kirghiz Soviet Socialist Republic. In 1996, Eduard Sogomonyants founded the Caravan association, which runs a Sunday school teaching Armenian language and culture to the community's children.

According to the 2009 Census, the Armenian population in Kyrgyzstan was 890, falling from 3,975 in the 1989 census and 1,364 in the 1999 census. Their numbers have actually been bolstered in recent years by new migrants from among the Armenian community in Turkmenistan. Roughly half are Hamshenis, Muslims of Armenian origin.

=== Tajikistan ===
There is a small community of Armenians in Tajikistan. The 1989 census found 5,630 Armenians in Tajikistan; however, many left the country in the years following due to hardships caused by the collapse of the Soviet Union and the following civil war in Tajikistan. Another driver for emigration was the fear of anti-Armenian prejudice, as seen in the 1990 Dushanbe riots which were sparked by an unfounded rumour that large numbers of Armenian refugees would be resettled there and get free housing during a period when there was a housing shortage. By the time of the 2000 census, only 995 people identifying themselves as Armenian remained, primarily in Dushanbe, Khujand, Chkalovsk, and Qurghonteppa. 57.6% could speak Armenian, 100% could speak Russian, and 14.8% could speak Tajik. According to interviews with community members, the first Armenians are believed to have arrived in Tajikistan in the 1930s. A number later rose to prominent positions in society, such as the former head of the Academy of Sciences of Tajikistan Dr. Arutyunov.

=== Uzbekistan ===
Armenians in Uzbekistan refers to ethnic Armenians living in Uzbekistan. They number around 40,000. The Armenian community of Uzbekistan is the largest community in Central Asia, and most of them live in Tashkent. The modern day community formed during the Armenian genocide when many Armenians fled through Azerbaijan to Uzbekistan for safety in the Russian empire, and then made communities in Samarkand, Tashkent, Andijan, Fergana, and many other cities. After the Soviet Union was formed, the Armenians became big contributors to the Uzbekistani economy and agriculture, with many holding high positions in government and skilled labor. After the collapse of the Soviet Union, however, many Armenians moved to mainly to Russia, but also to Armenia and the United States.

There are still many Armenians living in Uzbekistan nevertheless. Their main language is Russian, but some still speak Armenian at home. Instead of seeing the typical "ian" or "yan" at the end of Uzbek-Armenian last names, many will encounter Armenians with "ov" or "ts" at the end. This gives great insight into the heavy amount of Russian influence on Armenians in Uzbekistan. The Armenians still keep their traditions alive by their music, religion, and food however. Additionally, there are many Armenian cafes and restaurants in Tashkent and Samarkand. There are even two Armenian Churches in Uzbekistan, one in Samarkand and the other in Tashkent. The Armenian Church in Samarqand was firstly opened in 1905, but during the Soviet Union era it was closed and in 1995 a Businessman from Samarqand of an Armenian Origin – Artur Martirosyan, donated to re-construct and re-open the Church.

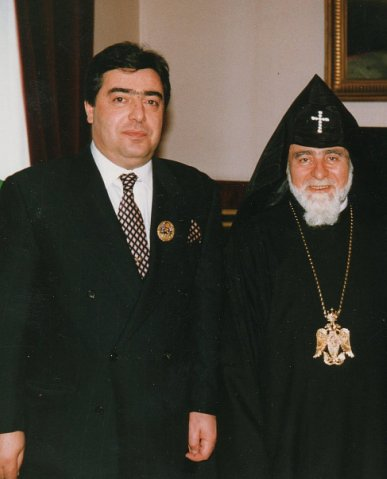
Artur Martirosyan and the Catholicos of All Armenians Karekin I

Notable people

- Yuriy Sarkisyan, football manager
- Artyom Filiposyan, football player
- Vadim Abramov, football manager
- Artur Grigorian, boxer
- Andrey Akopyants, football player
- Tamara Khanum, an Uzbek dancer of Armenian origin

== See also ==
- Eastern Armenian
- Hemshin peoples
