= Historical Jewish population =

Jewish population sizes throughout history

Jewish population centers have shifted significantly over time, due to large scale population movements, religious conversions and assimilation. Population movements have been caused by both push and pull factors. Expulsions and persecutions have historically been major push factors, especially the pogroms in the Russian Empire and the Holocaust.

The 20th century saw a large shift in Jewish populations, particularly the large-scale migration to the Americas and Palestine (later Israel). The 1948 Palestine war sparked mass exodus of Jews from Arab and Muslim countries. Today, the majority of the world's Jewish population is concentrated in Israel and the United States.

== Ancient times ==
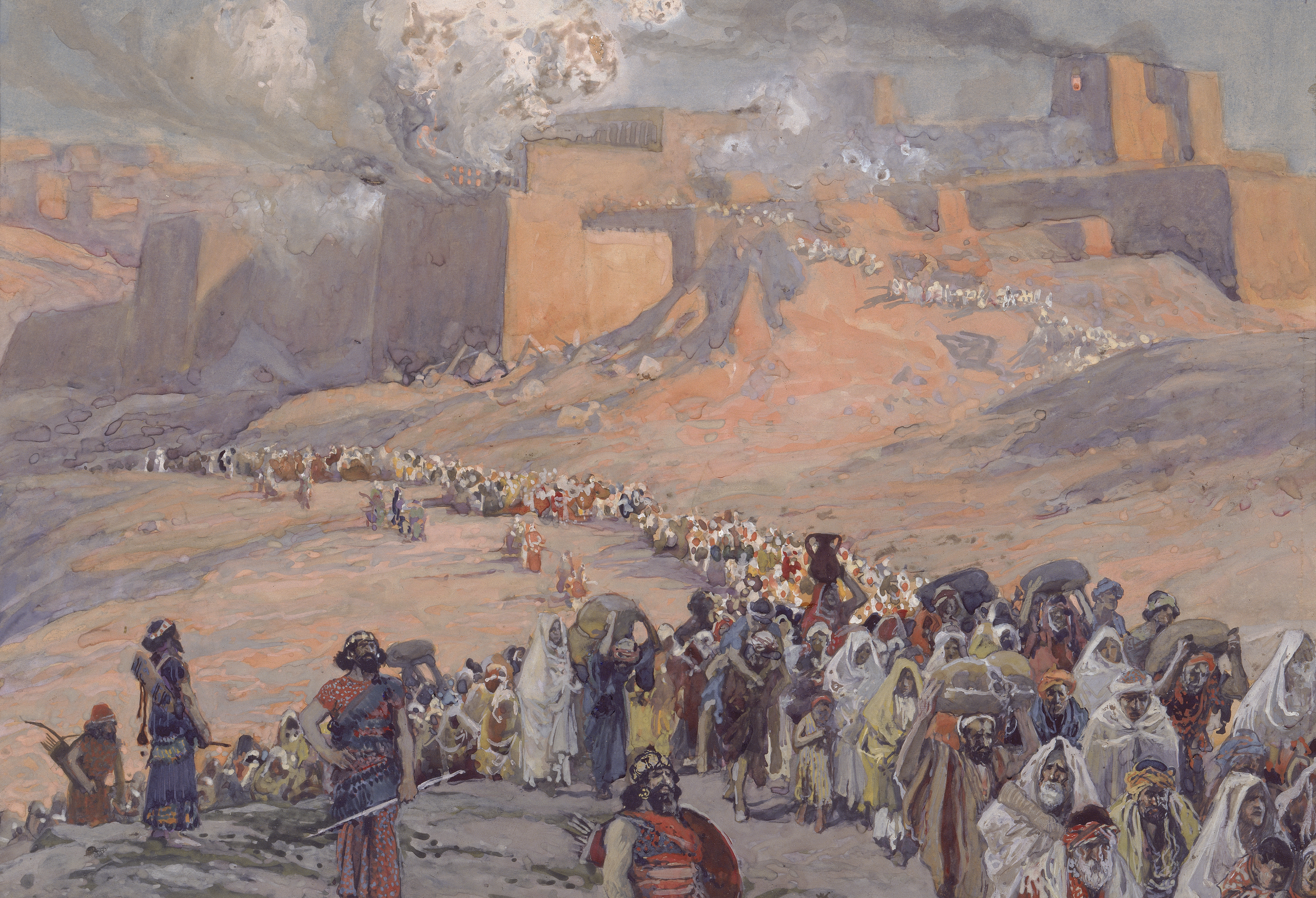
The Flight of the Prisoners by James Tissot showing Babylonian captivity, deportation and exile of the Jews of the ancient Kingdom of Judah to Babylon and the destruction of Jerusalem and Solomon's Temple, 586 BCE.

The Torah contains a number of statements as to the number of (adult, male) Hebrews that left Egypt, the descendants of the seventy sons and grandsons of Jacob who took up their residence in that country. Altogether, including Levites, the number given is 611,730. For non-Levites, this represents men fit for military service, i.e. between twenty and sixty years of age; among the Levites the relevant number is those obligated in temple service (males between twenty and fifty years of age). This would imply a population of about 3,000,000. The Census of David is said to have recorded 1,300,000 males over twenty years of age, which would imply a population of over 5,000,000. The number of exiles who returned from Babylon is given at 42,360. Tacitus declares that Jerusalem at its fall contained 600,000 persons; Josephus, that there were as many as 1,100,000 slain in the destruction of Jerusalem in CE 70, along with 97,000 who were sold as slaves. However, Josephus also qualifies this count, noting that Jerusalem was besieged during the Passover. The majority of the 1,197,000 would not have been residents of the city, but rather were visiting for the festival. These appear (writes Jacobs) to be all the figures accessible for ancient times, and their trustworthiness is a matter of dispute. 1,100,000 is comparable to the population of the largest cities that existed anywhere in the world before the 19th century, but by area, the Old City of Jerusalem is just a few percent the size of such cities as ancient Rome, Constantinople, Edo period Tokyo and Han dynasty Xi'an. The difficulties of commissariat in the Sinai desert for such a number as 3,000,000 have been pointed out by John William Colenso.

In the Bar Kokhba revolt of 132–135 CE, 580,000 Jews were slain, according to Cassius Dio (lxix. 14). According to Theodor Mommsen, in the first century C.E. there were no fewer than 1,000,000 Jews in Egypt, in a total of 8,000,000 inhabitants; of these 200,000 lived in Alexandria, whose total population was 500,000. Adolf Harnack (Ausbreitung des Christentums, Leipzig, 1902) reckons that there were 1,000,000 Jews in Syria (which included Lebanon) and the areas east of the Euphrates at the time of Nero in 60's CE, and 700,000 in Judea, and he allows for an additional 1,500,000 in other places, thus estimating that there were in the first century 4,200,000 Jews in the world. Jacobs remarks that this estimate is probably excessive.

By the first century, the Jewish community in Babylonia, to which Jews were exiled after the Babylonian conquest as well as after the Bar Kokhba rebellion in 135 CE, already held a speedily growing population of an estimated one million Jews, which increased to an estimated two million between the years 200 CE and 500 CE, both by natural growth and by immigration of more Jews from the Land of Israel, making up about one-sixth of the world Jewish population in that era. The 13th-century author Bar Hebraeus gave a figure of 6,944,000 Jews in the Roman world; Salo Wittmayer Baron considered the figure convincing. The figure of seven million within and one million outside the Roman world in the mid-first century became widely accepted, including by Louis Feldman.

However, contemporary scholars now accept that Bar Hebraeus based his figure on a census of total Roman citizens, the figure of 6,944,000 being recorded in Eusebius' Chronicon. John R. Bartlett rejects Baron's figures entirely, arguing that we have no clue as to the size of the Jewish demographic in the ancient world. Louis Feldman, previously an active supporter of the figure, now states that he and Baron were mistaken.

== Middle Ages ==
In 1170, Benjamin of Tudela estimated that the total Jewish population was 1,049,565. He attributed 100,000 to Persia and India, 100,000 to Arabia, and 300,000 to an undecipherable "Thanaim", which is assumed to describe a community of Eastern Jews he didn't personally encounter. Modern estimates of the Jewish population during the Middle Ages are around 500,000 in the countries Benjamin of Tudela visited and 750,000 total. Historical data is not available for most of the Jewish population during the time period.

Jewish communities faced repeated expulsions throughout the Middle Ages. In 1290, 16,000 Jews were expelled from England. In 1306, 100,000 were expelled from France. In 1492, around 200,000 were expelled from Spain. Smaller but more frequent expulsions occurred in Germany. At the beginning of the 16th century, only four great Jewish communities remained: 2,000 in Frankfurt, 1,400 in Worms, 10,000 in Prague, and 3,000 in Vienna (Heinrich Grätz, Geschichte der Juden x. 29). Joseph Jacobs estimated that from 1000 to 1500, 380,000 Jews were killed during the persecutions, reducing the total number in the world to around 1,000,000. In the 16th and 17th centuries, the main centers of the Jewish population were in Poland and the Mediterranean countries, except for Spain, where Jews were banned.

By the early 13th century, the world Jewish population had fallen to 1-2 million from a peak at 8 million during the 1st century. An estimated 250,000 lived in areas under Christian rule. Many factors contributed to the reduction the Jewish population, including the Bar Kokhba revolt and the First Crusade.

Cecil Roth estimated that by the year 1500, the number of the Historic Ashkenazim in Germany, France and Austria combined was around 150,000. The majority of the population was expelled to Poland and Lithuania, where a smaller group of Jewish people already resided. Roth estimated the number of the Jews who predated the Ashkenazim in Eastern Europe to be at about 230,000. These communities lost their identities as Knaanim and Romaniotes and assimilated into the Ashkenazi liturgy. Edgar Polomé and Werner Winter had and estimated the number of pre-Ashkenazim Eastern European Jews to be around 300,000. Mass migrations of Ashkenazim to Eastern Europe and high birth rates lead to a replacement of non-Ashkenazi Jewish groups in the region. Demographer Sergio Della Pergola estimated the pre-Ashkenazi Eastern European Jewish population to be have been small. Genetic evidence indicates that Yiddish-speaking Eastern European Jews largely descend from Ashkenazi Jews, who migrated from west and central Europe around the late Middle Ages and subsequently experienced high birthrates and genetic isolation.

It is estimated by some modern geneticists from Israel that modern Ashkenazi Jews descend from about 25,000 individuals who lived in 1300 A.D. A study by Shai Carmi et al. indicated a smaller population, estimating that modern Ashkenazi Jews commonly descend from approximately 350 individuals who lived around 1350 A.D., and who were of an even mix of Middle Eastern and European ancestry.

== Modern era ==
Dutch researcher Adriaan Reland published an account of his visit to Ottoman Palestine in 1714. In his informal census, he relates the existence of significant Jewish populations throughout the country, particularly in Jerusalem, Tiberias, Safed, and Gaza. Hebron also had a significant Jewish community. Together, these communities formed what would be called the Old Yishuv.

Following the estimates of Joseph Jacobs, Jacques Basnage estimated the total number of European Jews at 1,360,000 during the beginning of the 18th century. According to a census from the First Partition of Poland in 1772, the Jewish population of the Polish–Lithuanian Commonwealth numbered 308,500. Historians have estimated that the European Jewish population was less than 400,000 during the middle of the 18th century, and around 1,000,000 globally, including in Islamic territories.

The Jewish population experienced rapid increase during the next few centuries. Growth became restricted in Germany by the laws limiting the number of Jews in special towns, as well as by overcrowding in Jewish communities. Joseph Jacobs cited 7,951 Jews in Prague in 1786 and 5,646 in 1843, and 2,214 in Frankfurt in 1811.

Chubinsky reported that in 1840, the Jews of southern Russia were accustomed to live thirteen in a house, while the average was only four to five people per house among the general population. The rapid increase was due to the early age of marriage and the low number of deaths of infants within stable communities. Most historical demographic records that survived are from the Netherlands, Hungary, Poland, and Württemberg.

In the Jewish Encyclopedia, Joseph Jacobs presented evidence that the increase in the Jewish population during this period may have exceeded that of the general population, but remarked also that population increases are often very deceptive; they may be indicative of growth via immigration, not a surplus of births over deaths. This phenomenon may explain population growth in Germany during the early part of the 19th century, when many Jews from Galicia and Poland moved westward. In the late 19th century, Arthur Ruppin wrote that that the growth of the Jewish population in Germany had almost entirely ceased when forcible measures were taken to prevent Russian Jews from settling in Germany. Low birth rates and emigration may have also been contributing factors. During this period, England and the United States showed notable Jewish immigration.

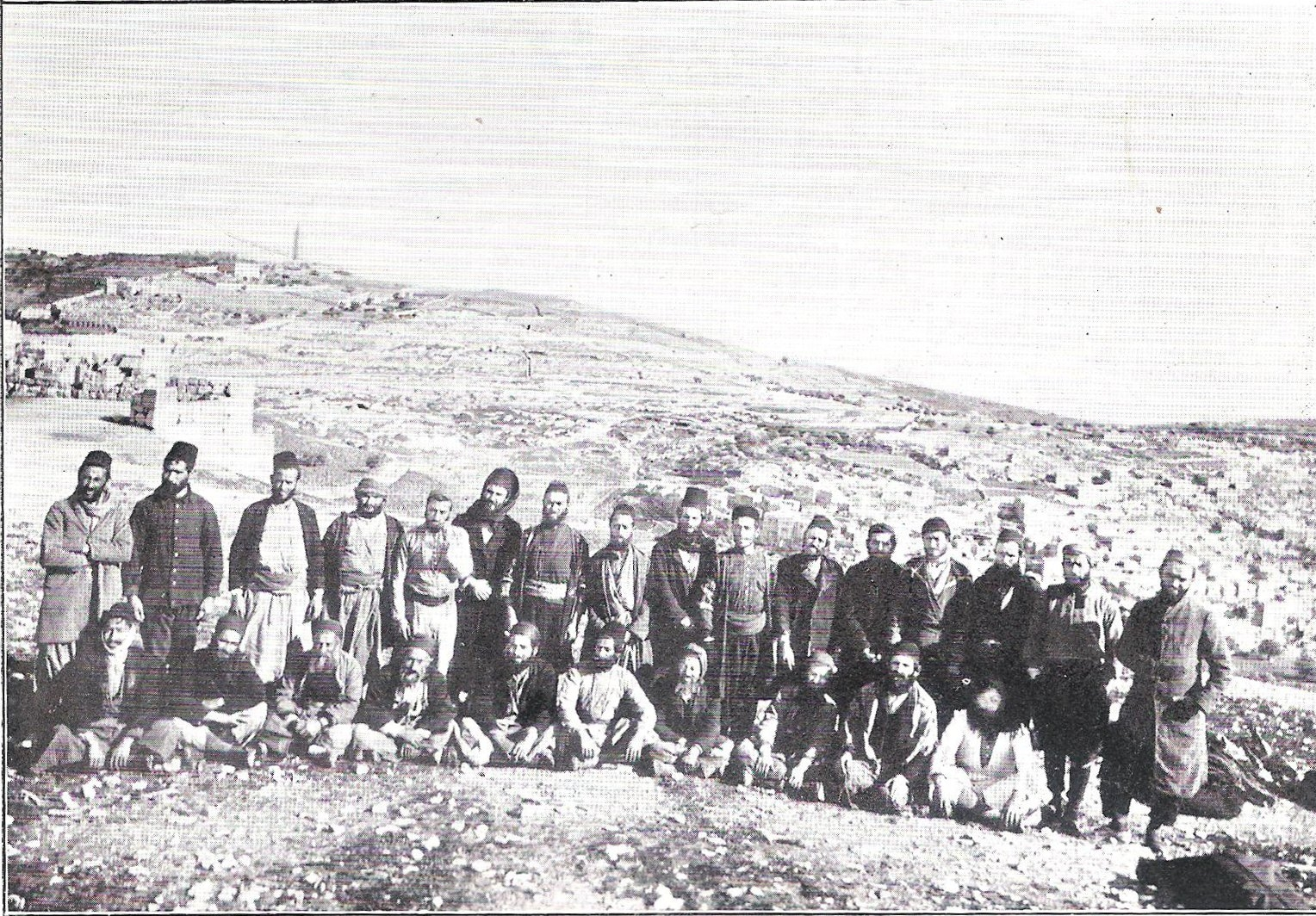
Photograph of Sephardi Jews in 19th century taken from 1899 book Views from Palestine and its Jewish colonies.

Jewish population numbers were offset by conversion from Judaism to other religions. While Halakha (Jewish law) says that a Jew who converts is still a Jew, many rejected their Jewish identity to avoid persecution. Converts to Christianity generally ceased to be considered part of the Jewish community. The Jewish Encyclopedia cited statistics on conversion of Jews to Protestantism, Roman Catholicism, Greek Catholicism and Orthodox Christianity. An estimate of around 2,000 European Jews converted to Christianity every year during most of the 19th century. In the 1890s, the number of converts increased to 3,000 per year; 1,000 in Austria-Hungary, 1,000 in Russia, 500 in Germany, and the remainder in the Anglo-Saxon world. The decrease in the Jewish population was balanced by around 500 converts to Judaism each year, who were mainly former Christian women who married Jewish men. For Russia, Galicia, and Romania, emigration surpassed conversions. In the last quarter of the 19th century, an estimated 1,000,000 Jews from these areas of Europe emigrated, primarily to the United States and the United Kingdom.

Toward the end of the 19th century, estimates of the number of Jews in the world ranged from about 6,200,000 (Encyclopædia Britannica, 1881) to 10,932,777 (American Jewish Year Book, 1904–1905). Previous estimates were around half of these numbers, though estimates of the total population of Europe also doubled between 1800 and 1900.

Jewish population by country (2020)

The Jewish Encyclopedia cites an estimated population of 314,000 Sephardic Jews at the end of the 19th century. Modern researchers suggest that this estimate may be low. The same source gives two different estimates for the Falasha (Ethiopian Jews) at 50,000 and 200,000; the former is closer to their present-day population.

In 1945, the global Jewish population was estimated to be around 11 million, following significant losses following World War II and the Holocaust. After the war, it took 15 years for the Jewish population to increase by 1 million, reaching 12 million in 1960. From the 1970s to the mid-1990s, the global Jewish population experienced stagnation, characterized by near-zero population growth. However, since the 1990s, demographic growth has been observed, largely due to increased population growth in Israel. The global Jewish population reached 13 million in 1995, 14 million in 2010, and 15 million in 2020. The global Jewish population has not yet recovered to its pre-World War II size of approximately 16.5 million. According to a 2017 Pew Research Center survey, the number of Jewish people around the world is expected to increase from 14.3 million in 2015 to 16.4 million in 2060.

The global Jewish population is shaped by contrasting demographic trends in Israel and the Jewish diaspora. In Israel, the Jewish population has experienced significant growth, increasing from approximately 630,000 in 1948 to nearly 6.9 million in 2021. The Jewish population in the diaspora, which was around 10.5 million in 1945, remained relatively stable until the early 1970s, when it began to decline. The diaspora population reached an estimated 8.2 to 8.3 million by 2000, and later stabilized. As of 2021, over 85% of the global Jewish population resided in Israel and the United States. Additionally, 23 countries with Jewish populations exceeding 10,000 accounted for another 14%, while 77 countries, each with fewer than 10,000 Jews, comprised the remaining 1%. World core Jewish population estimates (1945-2020):

Year	Estimate	Annual% change
1945	11,000,000	
1950	11,297,000	0.57
1960	12,079,000	0.67
1970	12,585,000	0.41
1980	12,819,000	0.18
1990	12,868,000	0.04
2000	13,250,000	0.29
2005	13,620,000	0.55
2010	14,049,000	0.62
2015	14,551,600	0.71
2020	15,077,100	0.71

== Comparisons ==
Region	Jews, No. (1900)	Jews, % (1900)	Jews, No. (1942)	Jews, % (1942)	Jews, No. (1970)	Jews, % (1970)	Jews, No. (2010)	Jews, % (2010)	Jews, No. (2020)	Jews, % (2020)
Europe	8,977,581	2.20%	9,237,314		3,228,000	0.50%	1,455,900	0.18%	1,300,000	0.1%
Austria (Cisleithania)	1,224,899	4.68%					9,000	0.11%		
Belgium	12,000	0.18%	60,000	0.7%			30,300	0.28%	42,000	0.36%
Bosnia and Herzegovina	8,213	0.58%					500	0.01%	281	0.00%
Bulgaria/Turkey/Ottoman Empire^{[a]}	390,018	1.62%					24,300	0.02%	8,000	0.1%
Denmark	5,000	0.20%					6,400	0.12%		
France	86,885	0.22%	250,000	0.6%	530,000	1.02%	483,500	0.77%	450,000	0.69%
Germany	586,948	1.04%			30,000	0.04%	119,000	0.15%	118,000	0.14%
Hungary (Transleithania)	851,378	4.43%	445,000	5.1%	70,000	0.68%	48,600	0.49%	47,300	0.48%
Ireland/United Kingdom	250,000	0.57%	300,000	0.65%	390,000	0.70%	293,200	0.44%	292,000	0.43%
Italy	34,653	0.10%	48,000	0.11%			28,400	0.05%		
Luxembourg	1,200	0.50%					600	0.12%		
Netherlands	103,988	2.00%	156,000	1.8%			30,000	0.18%		
Norway/Sweden	5,000	0.07%	7,100	0.07%			16,200	0.11%		
Poland	1,316,776	16.25%	3,000,000	9.5%			3,200	0.01%		
Portugal	1,200	0.02%	1,200	0.02%			500	0.00%		
Romania	269,015	4.99%	756,000	4.2%			9,700	0.05%	9,000	0.04%
Russian Empire/RSFSR/Russian Federation (Europe)^{[b]}	3,907,102	3.17%	2,525,000	3.4%	1,897,000	0.96%	311,400	0.15%	165,000	0.1%
Serbia	5,102	0.20%					1,400	0.02%		
Spain	5,000	0.02%	4,000	0.02%			12,000	0.03%	11,700	0.02%
Switzerland	12,551	0.38%					17,600	0.23%		
Asia	352,340	0.04%	774,049		2,940,000	0.14%	5,741,500	0.14%	6,699,700	0.15%
Arabia/Yemen	30,000	0.42%					200	0.00%	6	0.00%
China/Taiwan/Japan	2,000	0.00%					2,600	0.00%	4,100	0.00%
India	18,228	0.0067%					5,000	0.00%	4,800	0.00%
Iran	35,000	0.39%					10,400	0.01%	8,500	0.01%
Israel	50,000		441,000		2,582,000	86.82%	5,413,800	74.62%	6,940,000	74.2%
Russian Empire/RSFSR/Russian Federation (Asia)^{[c]}	89,635	0.38%			254,000	0.57%	18,600	0.02%		
Africa	372,659	0.28%	593,736		195,000	0.05%	76,200	0.01%	72,000	
Algeria	51,044	1.07%	120,000	1.7%	2,000	0.01%	0	0.00%	0	0.00%
Egypt	30,678	0.31%					100	0.00%	9	0.00%
Ethiopia	50,000	1.00%					100	0.00%		
Libya	18,680	2.33%					0	0.00%	0	0.00%
Morocco	109,712	2.11%					2,700	0.01%	2,100	0.00%
South Africa	50,000	4.54%			118,000	0.53%	70,800	0.14%	67,500	0.11%
Tunisia	62,545	4.16%					1,000	0.01%	1,000	0.00%
Americas	1,553,656	1.00%	4,739,769		6,200,000	1.20%	6,039,600	0.64%		
Argentina	20,000	0.42%			282,000	1.18%	182,300	0.45%		
Bolivia/Chile/Ecuador/Peru/Uruguay	1,000	0.01%					41,400	0.06%		
Brazil	2,000	0.01%			90,000	0.09%	95,600	0.05%		
Canada	22,500	0.42%			286,000	1.34%	375,000	1.11%		
Central America	4,035	0.12%					54,500	0.03%		
Colombia/Guiana/Venezuela	2,000	0.03%					14,700	0.02%		
Mexico	1,000	0.01%	18,299	0.09%	35,000	0.07%	39,400	0.04%		
Suriname	1,121	1.97%					200	0.04%		
United States	1,500,000	1.97%	4,228,529	3.00%	5,400,000	2.63%	5,275,000	1.71%	6,700,000	2.04%
Oceania	16,840	0.28%	26,954		70,000	0.36%	115,100	0.32%	125,600	0.3%
Australia	15,122	0.49%			65,000	0.52%	107,500	0.50%	118,000	0.48%
New Zealand	1,611	0.20%					7,500	0.17%	7,500	0.15%
Total	11,273,076	0.68%	15,371,822		12,633,000	0.4%	13,428,300	0.19%		

a. Albania, Iraq, Jordan, Lebanon, Macedonia, Syria, Turkey
b. Baltic states (Estonia, Latvia, Lithuania), Belarus, Moldova, Russia (including Siberia), Ukraine.
c. Caucasus (Armenia, Azerbaijan, Georgia), Central Asia (Kazakhstan, Kyrgyzstan, Tajikistan, Turkmenistan, Uzbekistan).

== See also ==
- Aliyah
- Estimates of historical world population
- Expulsions and exoduses of Jews
- Genetic studies on Jews
- Historical Jewish population by country
- Historical Armenian population
- Jewish diaspora
- Jewish ethnic divisions
- Jewish history
- Yerida
