= Noravank Foundation =

Armenia-based think tank

"Noravank" Foundation was established in 2000 with the support of the Government of Armenia with an aim to conduct strategic research in cooperation with Armenian and foreign senior staff, to analyze problems facing Armenians, the Armenian Diaspora, church-state relations, and to promote Armenology. It is headquartered in Yerevan. Currently, the Executive Director of the Foundation is Gagik Harutyunyan.

== Functions ==
The Noravank Foundation also carries out an educational program to inform young researchers about up to date ideas prevailing in social and political sciences via seminars and conferences, and through the multi-language journal of "21st Century" and "Noravank Foundation Bulletin".

== Publications ==
More than 300 books, journals, and other publications have been produced by Noravank, including:

- The Armenians and Baku (in Russian), 2007, by Khachatur Dadaian
- The Armenian Question and the Armenian Genocide, 2006, by Arman Kirakossian
- Some issues on Armenians’ ethnogeny, 2006, by Armen Petrosyan
- The problems of economic security: methodology and results, 2005, by Ashot Markosyan; etc.
- ANALYTICAL CENTERS OF THE REGION (Georgia, Azerbaijan, Turkey), Arestakes Simavoryan, Anushavan Barseghyan, Jonni Melikyan, 2015.
- CENTERS FOR ARMENIAN STUDIES ABROAD: ASSESSMENT OF POTENTIAL, Arestakes Simavoryan, Vahram Hovyan, Tigran Ghanalanyan, 2014.
- ARMENIAN CATHOLIC AND EVANGELICAL COMMUNITIES IN TURKEY: MODERN TENDENCIES, Arestakes Simavoryan, Vahram Hovyan, 2012.
- SCIENTIFIC AND ANALYTICAL COMMUNITY OF THE ARMENIAN DIASPORA. Organizational matters and cooperation prospects, Arestakes Simavoryan, Vahram Hovyan, Tigran Ghanalanyan, Gagik Harutyunyan, 2013.
- CONFESSIONAL AND RELIGIOUS ORIENTATIONS OF THE ARMENIANS IN RUSSIAN FEDERATION, Arestakes Simavoryan, Vahram Hovyan, 2011.
- ISSUES OF THE ARMENIAN COMMUNITIES IN EASTERN EUROPE, Anna Jhamakochyan, Arestakes Simavoryan, Vahram Hovyan, Diana Galstyan, etc.; 2011.
- PROBLEMS AND POSSIBILITIES OF THE CONFESSIONAL SEGMENTS OF DIASPORA, Arestakes Simavoryan, Vahram Hovyan, Hovhannes Hovhannisyan, Ruben Melkonyan, etc.; 2011.
- ARMENIAN COMMUNITY IN THE USA, Haykaram Nahapetyan, Arestakes Simavoryan, Karen Veranyan, Tigran Ghanalanyan, 2010.
- SOME MAIN ISSUES OF THE ARMENIANS IN JAVAKHQ The study of the religious and information situation of the Armenians in Javakhq, Arestakes Simavoryan, Vahram Hovyan, 2009.
