= Demographic history of the Palestine region =

Palestine demographics, 1st century through the Mandate. Figures in thousands, i.e. 100 represents 100,000, 1,000 represents 1,000,000. See also the detailed timeline
Year	Jews	Christians	Muslims	Total
1st c.	Majority	–	–	~2,500
4th c.	Majority	Minority	–	>1st c.
5th c.	Minority	Majority	–	>1st c.
End 12th c.	Minority	Minority	Majority	>225
14th c.	Minority	Minority	Majority	150
1533–1539	5	6	145	156
1553–1554	7	9	188	205
1690–1691	2	11	219	232
1800	7	22	246	275
1890	43	57	432	532
1914	94	70	525	689
1922	84	71	589	752
1931	175	89	760	1,033
1947	630	143	1,181	1,970
Estimates by Sergio DellaPergola (2001), drawing on the work of Bachi (1975). Figures in thousands.

The population of the region of Palestine, which approximately corresponds to modern Israel and Palestine, has varied in both size and ethnic composition throughout its history. Some see this demographic history as having implications in debates related to the matter of indigeneity in the region of Palestine and therefore political legitimacy in the Israeli–Palestinian conflict.

Studies of Palestine's demographic changes over the millennia have shown that a Jewish majority in the first century AD had changed to a Christian majority by the 3rd century AD, and later to a Muslim majority, which is thought to have existed in Mandatory Palestine (1920–1948) since at least the 12th century AD, during which the total shift to Arabic language was completed.

== Iron Age ==
During the seventh century BC, no fewer than eight nations were settled in Palestine. These included the Arameans of the kingdom of Geshur; the Samaritans who replaced the Israelite kingdom in Samaria; the Phoenicians in the northern cities and parts of Galilee; the Philistines in the Philistine pentapolis; the three kingdoms of the Transjordan– Ammon, Moab and Edom; and the Judaeans of Kingdom of Judah.

According to Finkelstein and Broshi, the population of Palestine at the end of the eighth century BC was around 400,000. In the area of Judah in the central hills, Benjamin and Jerusalem, the population was approximately 110,000. By the early sixth century, Ofer's survey results suggest that around 100,000 lived in the kingdom of Judah, with the population in the central hills, Benjamin and Jerusalem about 69,000.

A study by Yigal Shiloh of The Hebrew University suggests that the population of Palestine in the Iron Age could have never exceeded one million. He writes: "... the population of the country in the Roman-Byzantine period greatly exceeded that in the Iron Age..." Shiloh accepted Israeli archaeologist Magen Broshi's estimates of Palestine's population at 1,000,000–1,250,000 and noted that Iron Age Israel's population must have been less considering population growth. "...If we accept Broshi's population estimates, which appear to be confirmed by the results of recent research, it follows that the estimates for the population during the Iron Age must be set at a lower figure." One study of population growth from 1000 BC to 750 BC estimated the population of Palestine (Judah and Israel) had an average natural growth of 0.4 per cent per annum.

== Persian period ==
Population distribution in Persian period Yehud
Territory	Carter	Lipschits	Finkelstein
Benjamin	7625	12,500	-
Jerusalem (and environs)	1500	2750	400 (Note: Excluding environs.)
Northern Judean Hills	8850	9750	-
Southern Judean Hills	2150	-	-
Shephelah	-	4875	-
Judean Desert/Eastern Strip	525	250	-
Total	20,650	30,125	12,000
Lipshits' data from The Fall and Rise of Jerusalem: Judah under Babylonian Rule, Carter's data from The Emergence of Yehud in the Persian Period, Finkelstein's data from The Territorial Extent and Demography of Yehud/Judea

After the Babylonian conquest of Judah and exile, the population and settlement density of Jerusalem, the Shephelah and the Naqab desert dropped significantly. The Persian province of Yehud Medinata was sparsely-populated and predominantly rural, with around half of the settlements of late Iron age Judah and a population of around 30,000 in the 5th to 4th centuries BC. On the other hand, settlement continuity is discerned in the northern parts of the Judean mountains and the Benjamin area. Cities such as Tell en-Nasbeh, Gibeon and Bethel managed to escape destruction and remained continuously inhabited until the early Achaemenid rule.

As early as the 7th century BC, Edomites had lived in the Naqab desert and southern Judah, and by the time Judah fell in 586 BC there was already a substantial Edomite population in southern Judah. When the kingdom of Edom itself succumbed, those people continued its traditions in the south, which the Arabic-speaking Qedarites controlled. This area, which became known as Idumaea, was inhabited by a diverse population of Edomites, Judahites, Phoenicians, Qedarites and other Arabs. Based on analysis of epigraphic material and ostraca from the region, around 32% of recorded names were Arabic, 27% were Edomite, 25% were Northwest Semitic, 10% were Judahite (Hebrew) and 5% were Phoenician. A few names were also classified Egyptian and Old Iranian.

The exilic returnees resettled during the time of Cyrus the Great, perhaps with a heightened sense of their ethnic identity. Along the coast of western Palestine, the Phoenicians expanded their presence, while Moabites and Ammonites took refuge in the Cisjordan after the destruction of their kingdoms in 582 BC.

== Hellenistic and Hasmonean period ==
Following the Macedonian conquest of the Achaemenid Empire and the subsequent Wars of the Diadochi, Palestine came under Hellenistic rule and was contested by the Seleucids and Ptolemaics.

Between 167 and 160 BC, the Jewish rebel faction of the Maccabees revolted against Seleucid rule, ultimately leading to the independence of the Hasmonean dynasty. Under John Hyrcanus, the Hasmoneans expanded their territories beyond the traditional confines of Judea and incorporated non-Jewish areas in the process. 1 Maccabees relates that the non-Jewish inhabitants of Gezer and Joppa were expelled by Simon Thassi, who settled Jews in their place. Coinciding with the account of Josephus, archaeological evidence attests to significant destruction in the urban and rural settlements in Idumaea, Samaria and the coastal cities from the Hasmonean conquests, followed by the resettlement of Jews in the newly conquered territories. Nevertheless, there's evidence that some of the non-Jewish inhabitants stayed in all of the newly conquered areas.

Many sites in Idumaea experienced destruction, including Maresha, Khirbet el-Rasm, Tel Arad, Khirbet 'Uza and possibly Lachish. The lower city of Maresha and Tel Beersheba were soon abandoned, and evidence for an increased Idumaean presence in Egypt suggests some immigrated there. Idumaeans were eventually forcibly proselytized and co-opted into the Jewish nation by John Hyrcanus. Further north, the Galilee received significant Jewish migration from Judea after its conquest, contributing to a 50% increase in settlements, while the pagan population was greatly reduced. By the end of Alexander Jannaeus' reign, the Galilee was also predominantly Jewish. However, unlike John Hyrcanus, Alexander Jannaeus did not compel the non-Jews to assimilate to the Jewish ethnos and permitted minority ethnē to exist within Hasmonean borders, with the exception of Phoenician coastal cities in the north whom Josephus claims he enslaved.

== Roman period ==
=== Herodian and early Roman periods ===
The Roman conquest of Judea led by Pompey took place in 63 BC. The Roman occupation encompassed the end of Jewish independence in Judea, the last years of the Hasmonean kingdom, the Herodian age and the rise of Christianity, the First Jewish–Roman War, and the fall of Jerusalem and the destruction of the Second Temple, and later, the Bar Kokhba revolt.

Modern estimates vary: Applebaum argues that in the Herodian kingdom, there were 1.5 million Jews, a figure Ben David says covers the numbers in Judea alone. Salo Wittmayer Baron estimated the population at 2.3 million at the time of Roman emperor Claudius (reigned 41–54). According to Israeli archeologist Magen Broshi, west of the Jordan River the population certainly did not exceed 1 million:

"... the population of Palestine in antiquity did not exceed a million persons. It can also be shown, moreover, that this was more or less the size of the population in the peak period – the late Byzantine period, around AD 600"

Broshi made calculations based on the grain-producing capacity of Palestine and on its role in the indigenous diet, assuming an average annual per-capita consumption of 200 kg. (with a maximum of 250 kg.), which would work out to the limit of a sustainable population of 1,000,000 people, a figure which, Broshi states, remained roughly constant down to the end of the Byzantine period (600 CE). The proportion of Jews to gentiles is also unknown.

Local population displacements occurred with the expulsion of the Jews from Jerusalem – "In the earlier revolt in the previous century, 66–73 CE, Rome destroyed the Temple and forbade Jews to live in the remaining parts of Jerusalem; for this reason, the Rabbis gathered instead on the Mediterranean coast in Yavneh near Jaffa". Dispersal to other parts of the Roman Empire occurred, but some earlier settlements were also established as early as 4 BC. The total population of Pharisees, the forerunners of modern Rabbinic Judaism, was around 6,000 ("exakischilioi"), according to Josephus.

=== Impact of the Bar Kokhba revolt ===
The Bar Kokhba revolt of 132–136 CE saw a major shift in the population of Palestine. The conflict had catastrophic consequences for the Jewish population in Judea, characterized by massive loss of life, widespread enslavement, and extensive forced displacement. The scale of devastation surpassed even that of the first revolt, leaving the region of Judea (not to be confused with the broader province, Judaea) in a state of desolation. Jews were expelled from Jerusalem and a broad surrounding area covering almost the entire traditional district of Judea. Historian Shimon Applebaum estimates that approximately two-thirds of Judaea's Jewish population perished in the revolt, and some scholars, including historian Joan E. Taylor, and genocide scholars Paul R. Bartrop and Samuel Totten, characterize the Roman suppression of the uprising as an act of genocide.

According to a late epitome of Dio Cassius's Roman History, the Roman war operations in the country had left some 580,000 Jews dead, with many more dying of hunger and disease, while 50 of their most important outposts and 985 of their most famous villages were razed to the ground. "Thus," writes Dio Cassius, "nearly the whole of Judaea was made desolate." In 2003, historian Hannah Cotton described Dio's figures as highly plausible based on the accuracy of Roman census declarations. This was again supported in 2021 by an ethno-archaeological analysis by archaeologists Dvir Raviv and Chaim Ben David, who concluded that Dio's data represents a "reliable account" based on "contemporaneous documentation".

Archaeological evidence corroborates that Jewish settlement in Judea was almost completely eradicated by the end of the revolt. To date, no site in the region of Judea has revealed a continuous occupation layer throughout the 2nd century CE. Findings indicate signs of devastation or depopulation within the first decades of the century, followed by a period of abandonment. When certain former Jewish settlements were reoccupied in the late 2nd or early 3rd century, the new inhabitants were typically non-Jews; this is reflected in a material culture that differs significantly from that of the earlier Jewish population.

Roman policy also dictated the mass enslavement and deportation of captives beyond Judaea. The slave market was reportedly flooded with Jewish captives, who were sold into slavery and dispersed across the empire, significantly expanding the Jewish diaspora. One late ancient source states that Emperor Hadrian sold captives "for the price of a daily portion of food for a horse". Historian William V. Harris estimated that more than 100,000 Jews were enslaved. Jerome records the sale of Jewish slaves in Hebron and Gaza, their relocation to Egypt, and captives being resettled by Hadrian in the Cimmerian Bosporus (in modern day Russia and Ukraine). Robert Goldenberg suggests that following the revolt, many Jews likely abandoned Judaism, turning to Christianity or paganism, though these conversions received little attention in ancient sources and their numbers cannot be determined. He notes that 'Jewish followers of Jesus' (Jewish Christians) would not have taken part in the rebellions. The suppression of the revolt produced a large wave of refugees, some of whom settled in Babylonia, contributing to the spiritual development of the Jewish community in Mesopotamia during the following centuries.

At the same time, Jewish communities continued to thrive in other parts of Judea and Palestine as a whole. According to David Goodblatt: "The destruction of the Jewish metropolis of Jerusalem and its environs and the ventual refoundation of the city as the Roman colony of Aelia Capitolina had lasting repercussions. However, in other parts of Palestine the Jewish population remained strong. Literary and archaeological evidence indicates that in the Late Roman-early Byzantine era Jewish commuinities thrived along the eastern, southern and western edges of Judah, in the Galilee, Golan and the Beit Shean region. And a strong Jewish presence continued throughout this period in many poleis, including Caesarea Maritima and Scythopolis." He concludes that the Jews may have remained a majority into the 3rd century and even beyond. After the revolt, the make-up of the population of Palestine remains in doubt due to the sparsity of data in the historical record. Figures vary considerably as to the demographics of Palestine in the Christian era.

=== Late Roman period ===
At some point in late antiquity, Jews became a minority, though the exact timing remains disputed. Eschel argues that a combination of three events: the rise of Christianity, the Jewish-Roman wars and Jewish Diaspora made Jews in the minority. David Goodblatt contends that Jews suffered a setback following the Bar Kokhba revolt (132–136), noting that Jews were still in the majority until the 3rd century and even beyond, when Christianity became the empire's official religion, and continued to thrive in different parts of Palestine. According to Doron Bar, archaeological evidence of synagogue remains demonstrate a central Jewish presence throughout Palestine during the entire Byzantine period.

The 'ascension' of Constantine the Great in 312 and Christianity becoming the official state religion of Rome in 391, consequently brought to an end Jewish dominance in Palestine. Already by the mid-3rd century the Jewish majority had been reported to have been lost, while others conclude that a Jewish majority lasted much longer – "What does seem clear is a different kind of change – immigration of Christians and the conversion of pagans, Samaritans, and Jews eventually produced a Christian majority".

== Byzantine period ==
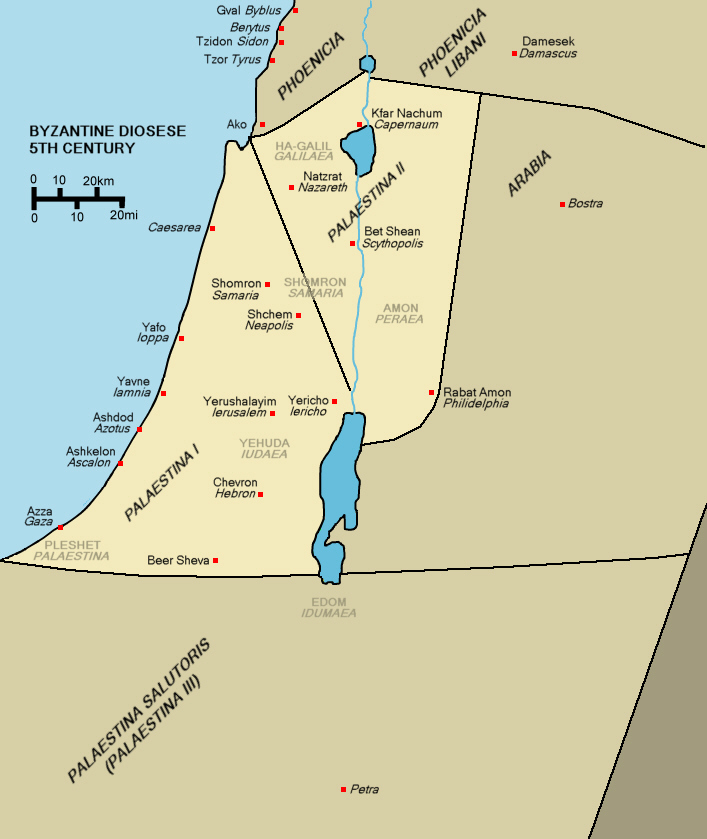
Byzantine provinces of Palestine

The administrative reorganization of the region in 284–305 AD by the Eastern Romans produced three Palestinian provinces of "Greater Palestine" which lasted from the 4th to the early 7th centuries: Palaestina Prima, which included the historic regions of Philistia, Judea and Samaria with the capital in Caesarea Maritima; Palaestina Secunda, which included the Galilee, the Golan Heights, as well as parts of Perea (western Transjordan) and the Decapolis, with its capital being Scythopolis; and Palaestina Salutaris which included Idumaea, the Naqab desert, Arabia Petraea, parts of Sinai, and Transjordan south of the Dead Sea, with its capital in Petra.

Under the Byzantines, the religious landscape of Palestine underwent a significant transformation, propelled by the widescale Christianization of the local Jewish, pagan and Samaritan communities, as well as immigration of Christian pilgrims and monks into the Holy land. After the failure of Bar Kokhba revolt in 135, Jews were barred from living in a large part of former Judaea. During this period, Jews were concentrated in the Galilee, the Golan and marginal areas of the Judaean hills, between Eleutheropolis and Hebron in the Daromas, with significant Jewish settlement in the strip between Ein Gedi and Ascalon. Jews also lived in the southern Jordan Valley near Jericho, where they were employed in date and Balsam plantations; around Narbata, in Samaria and in the Jezreel Valley. However, the main centres of Jewish life and culture during this period were the cosmopolitan cities of the coastal plains, particularly Lydda, Jamnia, Azotus and Caesarea Maritima. Samaritans, originally concentrated in communities around Mount Gerizim, had spread beyond Samaria proper in the second century and established communities in the coastal plains, Judea and the Galilee, with some Samaritan villages located as far as Golan. However, the Samaritan revolts against the Byzantines in 484–573 and their forced conversion to Christianity under Maurice (582–602) and Heraclius (610–641) significantly diminished their numbers.

Pagan tradition flourished in the period before Constantine, and pagans were a majority in the coastal plains, Judea, Samaria, the Naqab and much of the urban centers. Although proscribed in the Bible, pagan cults had thrived in Palestine throughout the First and Second Temple period, and many Jews did not escape it. According to E. Friedheim, many Jews in Palestine also embraced paganism and pagan cults again following the destruction of the Second Temple in 70 AD. Talmudic tradition forbid customs relating to 'the Amorite ways', showing a persistence of ancient Canaanite customs among the non-Jewish population and their inconsistent penetration into Jewish circles.

Christian presence at the start of this period was mainly evidenced in Hellenistic cities and some of the villages in southern Judea. However, Christianity's early influence in either the Jewish, Samaritan or pagan rural areas was minor and came at a much later stage around the sixth century, when many of the community churches in Judea, western Galilee, the Naqab and other places were built. By the fifth century, many pagan temples in Palestine including those in Jerusalem, Bethlehem, Mamre, Tel Qadesh and Tel Dan, had been demolished, and churches were erected in their place. In the rural sector, vast areas of Palestine, such as Galilee and Samaria, had Jewish and Samaritan majorities, and Christianity spread in these areas far more gradually and at a slower pace, achieving real momentum only during the second half of the Byzantine period. Christianity had also spread in the Nabataean cities, towns and villages in southern Palestine, where a mixed Christian and pagan population lived, with elaborate churches built in Abdah, Mampsis and Subeita.

Palestine reached its peak population of around 1 to 1.5 million during this period. However, estimates of the relative proportions of Jews, Samaritans and pagans vary widely and are speculative. By counting settlements, Avi-Yonah estimated that Jews comprised half the population of the Galilee at the end of the 3rd century, and a quarter in the other parts of the country, but had declined to 10–15% of the total by 614. On the other hand, by counting churches and synagogues, Tsafrir estimated the Jewish proportion to be 25% in the Byzantine period. Stemberger, however, considers that Jews were the largest population group at the beginning of the 4th century, closely followed by the pagans. According to Schiffman, DellaPergola and Bar, Christians only became the majority of the country's population at the beginning of the fifth century,

== Early Islamic Period ==
Early Islamic Syria (Bilad al-Sham) and its provinces under the Abbasids in the 9th century

Prior to the Muslim conquest of Palestine (635–640), Palaestina Prima had a population of 700 thousand, of which around 100 thousand were Jews and 30 to 80 thousand were Samaritans, with the remainder being Chalcedonian and Miaphysite Christians. Arabs came to constitute a ruling minority in Palestine who despised farming and kept their nomadic lifestyle, with the tribes of Lakhm, Judham, Kinana, Khath'am, Khuza'a, and Azd Sarat forming the army of Jund Filastin (military district of Palestine).

The pace of conversion to Islam among the various Christian, Jewish, and Samaritan communities in Palestine varied during the early period (638–1098), and opinions vary regarding the extent of Islamization during the early Islamic period. Some argue Palestine was already majority Muslim by the time of arrival of the First Crusade, while others contend that Christians were still in the majority and the process of mass adoption of Islam took place only from the 13th century onwards, during the Mamluk period.

According to archaeologist Gideon Avni, archaeological surveys show that most Christian settlements and sites preserved their identity up to the crusader period, supplemented by the numerosity of churches and monasteries all over Palestine. The early Muslim population, on the other hand, was confined to the Umayyad palaces in the Jordan Valley and around the Sea of Galilee, the ribat fortresses along the coast and the farms of the Naqab desert. Thus, conversion to Islam only gained real momentum in Palestine after Saladin's conquest of Jerusalem in 1187 and the expulsion of Franks. Arabic gradually replaced Palestinian Aramaic and largely by the 9th century, while Islamization was only finalized in the Mamluk period.

Urban centers continued to flourish after the Islamic conquest, but changes took place in the 9th and 10th centuries. According to Ellenblum, climate disasters and earthquakes in the late 10th & 11th centuries created internal chaos and famines throughout the Middle East, as well as population decline. Michael Ehrlich argues that the decline in urban centers likely caused local ecclesiastical administrations to weaken or disappear altogether, leaving Christians most susceptible to conversion. When certain urban centers collapsed, surrounding communities would have converted to Islam. Per Ellenblum, the eastern Galilee and central Samaria, where Jews and Samaritans were concentrated respectively, were converted rather quickly and had a Muslim or Jewish-Muslim majority by the crusader period. In Samaria, the sedentarization of nomadic tribes that penetrated Samaria was complemented by the mass conversion of the Samaritan population starting from the Tulunid period (884–905). By the 12th century, central Samaria was the only fully Islamized region in Palestine, while Christians predominated in southern Samaria, the Sinjil-Jerusalem area, the western Galilee and the Hebron Hills, which only converted in later periods. The introduction of Islam in the Hebron hills is archaeologically attested in Jewish villages but not Christian ones, mainly in Susya and Eshtemoa, where the local synagogues were repurposed as mosques.

Coastal cities such as Ramla and Ascalon thrived under the Fatimids (969–1099), where many Shiite scholars sought refuge and Shiite shrines were built, and the hinterland of Ramla was predominantly Muslim when the crusaders conquered it. On the other hand, Sufis played an important role in the Islamization of the hinterland of Jerusalem, where they built many religious buildings during the Mamluk period, transforming the cultural landscape. According to Nimrod Luz, when a Sufi settled in a Christian village, the local population often converted to Islam.

== Later Islamic period ==
In the 14th century, following the black death, the total population of Palestine, is estimated at 150,000, rising to an estimated 275,000 by 1800. The vast majority of the population during this time were Muslims and Christians, and, "A small permanent Jewish settlement existed, estimated at 7000 at the end of both the 12th and the 18th centuries, with periodical ups and downs."

While conversion to Islam appears to have halted and apparently even been reversed under the Kingdom of Jerusalem (1099–1291), it appears the process accelerated with the advent of the Ayyubids (1187–1260) and the consequent Mamluk takeover (1260–1517). By the start of the Ottoman period in 1516, it is commonly thought that the Muslim majority in the country was more-or-less like that of the mid-19th century. Conversion among the Samaritan families of Nablus to Islam continued well into the 19th century.

The 1492 Alhambra Decree forced tens of thousands of Spanish Jews who refused forced conversion to Catholicism to leave their homes. Some of them joined the Palestinian Jews (or Musta'arabi Jews) in Safed, Jerusalem, Hebron and Tiberias. They were joined in the years following by migrations of Sephardic Jews to existing Jewish communities in towns such as Ashkelon, Jaffa, Acre, Peki'in, Haifa and Beth Guvrin .

Traveller accounts to Safed from this period provide some information on the composition of the population. Under Crusader rule, Safed seems to have been predominantly Christian, with no Jews reported to be living there in 1170 when Benjamin de Tudela visited the city. This changed following the Ayyubid control of the city in 1188, as Samuel ben Samson, who visited in 1210 did find some Jewish families living there. Safed was made into an administrative center for the Galilee and Lebanon under Mamluk rule, and its church was converted into mosque. It was a religiously mixed city with the number of Jewish immigrants increasing significantly in the 15th and 16th centuries, particularly after it became a center for rabbinical proponents of Kabbalah.

Obadiah of Bertinoro who visited Jerusalem in 1488 reported that it was inhabited by about 4,000 families, 70 of whom were Jewish, most impoverished widows and elderly. He moved to Hebron in December 1489, where he was found a more well off community of 20 Jewish families within that city. Returning to Jerusalem by 1492, he found a synagogue there, by the descriptions he provides presumably a Sephardic one, though possible Karaite.

=== Ottoman period ===
==== Early Ottoman period ====
During the first century of the Ottoman rule, i.e., 1550, Bernard Lewis in a study of Ottoman registers of the early Ottoman Rule of Palestine reports a population of around 300,000:

From the mass of detail in the registers, it is possible to extract something like a general picture of the economic life of the country in that period. Out of a total population of about 300,000 souls, between a fifth and a quarter lived in the six towns of Jerusalem, Gaza, Safed, Nablus, Ramle, and Hebron. The remainder consisted mainly of peasants (fellahin), living in villages of varying size, and engaged in agriculture. Their main food-crops were wheat and barley in that order, supplemented by leguminous pulses, olives, fruit, and vegetables. In and around most of the towns there was a considerable number of vineyards, orchards, and vegetable gardens.

According to Justin McCarthy, the population of Palestine throughout the 17th and 18th centuries (1601–1801) was likely not much smaller than when it in 1850 (~340,000), after which it started to increase.

Year		Population			
	Ottoman	Muslims	Jews	Christians	Total
1850–1851	1267	300,000	13,000	27,000	340,000
1860–1861	1277	325,000	13,000	31,000	369,000
1877–1878	1295	386,320	13,942	40,588	440,850
1878–1879	1296	390,597	14,197	41,331	446,125
1879–1880	1297	394,935	14,460	42,089	451,484
1880–1881	1298	399,334	14,731	42,864	456,929
1881–1882	1299	403,795	15,011	43,659	462,465
1882–1883	1300	408,318	15,300	44,471	468,089
1883–1884	1301	412,906	15,599	45,302	473,807
1884–1885	1302	417,560	15,908	46,152	479,620
1885–1886	1303	422,280	16,228	47,022	485,530
1886–1887	1304	427,068	16,556	47,912	491,536
1887–1888	1305	431,925	16,897	48,823	497,645
1888–1889	1306	436,854	17,249	49,756	503,859
1889–1890	1307	441,267	17,614	51,065	509,946
1890–1891	1308	445,728	17,991	52,412	516,131
1891–1892	1309	450,239	18,380	53,792	522,411
1892–1893	1310	454,799	18,782	55,212	528,793
1893–1894	1311	459,410	19,198	56,670	535,278
1894–1895	1312	464,550	19,649	57,815	542,014
1895–1896	1313	469,750	20,117	58,987	548,854
1896–1897	1314	475,261	20,780	59,903	555,944
1897–1898	1315	480,843	21,466	60,834	563,143
1898–1899	1316	486,850	22,173	61,810	570,833
1899–1900	1317	492,940	22,905	62,801	578,646
1900–1901	1318	499,110	23,662	63,809	586,581
1901–1902	1319	505,364	24,446	64,832	594,642
1902–1903	1320	511,702	25,257	65,872	602,831
1903–1904	1321	518,126	26,096	66,928	611,150
1904–1905	1322	524,637	26,965	68,002	619,604
1905–1906	1323	531,236	27,862	69,092	628,190
1906–1907	1324	537,925	28,791	70,201	636,917
1907–1908	1325	544,704	29,753	71,327	645,784
1908–1909	1326	551,576	30,749	72,471	654,796
1909–1910	1327	558,541	31,778	73,633	663,952
1910–1911	1328	565,601	32,843	74,815	673,259
1910–1911	1329	572,758	33,946	76,015	682,719
1911–1912	1330	580,012	35,087	77,235	692,334
1912–1913	1331	587,366	36,267	78,474	702,107
1913–1914	1332	594,820	37,489	79,734	712,043
1914–1915	1333	602,377	38,754	81,012	722,143
Figures from McCarthy, 1990, p. 10.

=== Late Ottoman period ===
In the late 18th and early 19th centuries, there were several migration waves of Egyptians to Palestine. One notable influx occurred in the 1780s due to a severe famine in Egypt. The main migration wave happened between 1829 and 1841, when Muhammad Ali and Ibrahim Pasha invaded Palestine, some Egyptian settlers and army dropouts stayed in Palestine after Egyptian retreat. These migrants primarily settled in the low country: in the Beisan area, Wadi Araba, the Jezreel valley, the Shephelah, the coastal plain and the Negev desert. This represented the largest migrant group prior to the Jewish migratory waves, with David Grossman estimating the total number between 23,000 and 30,000 people. Algerian refugees ("Maghrebis") also arrived in Palestine in the 1850s following Abdelkader's rebellion.

Ottoman population in 1850
	Qaza (region)	Number of towns and villages	Number of households			
	Qaza (region)	Number of towns and villages	Muslims	Christians	Jews	Total
1	Jerusalem					
	Jerusalem	1	1,025	738	630	2,393
	Countryside	116	6,118	1,202	-	7,320
2	Hebron					
	Hebron	1	2,800	-	200	3,000
	Countryside	52	2,820	-	-	2,820
3	Gaza					
	Gaza	1	2,690	65	-	2,755
	Countryside	55	6,417	-	-	6,417
3	Jaffa					
	Jaffa	3	865	266	-	1,131
	Ludd	.	700	207	-	907
	Ramla	.	675	250	-	925
	Countryside	61	3,439	-	-	3,439
4	Nablus					
	Nablus	1	1,356	108	14	1,478
	Countryside	176	13,022	202	-	13,224
5	Jinin					
	Jinin	1	656	16	-	672
	Countryside	39	2,120	17	-	2,137
6	Akka					
	Akka	1	547	210	6	763
	Countryside	34	1,768	1,021	-	2,789
7	Haifa					
	Haifa	1	224	228	8	460
	Countryside	41	2,011	161	-	2,171
8	Nazareth					
	Nazareth	1	275	1,073	-	1,348
	Countryside	38	1,606	544	-	2,150
9	Tiberias					
	Tiberias	1	159	66	400	625
	Countryside	7	507	-	-	507
10	Safad					
	Safad	1	1,295	3	1,197	2,495
	Countryside	38	1,117	616	-	1,733
Figures from Ben-Arieh, in Scholch 1985, p. 388.

The population of Jews in Palestine in 18th century was primarily composed of Sephardic Jews and is esimated at about 2,000-3,000 people. In the late nineteenth century, prior to the rise of Zionism, Jews are thought to have comprised between 2% and 5% of the population of Palestine, although the precise population is not known. Jewish immigration had begun following the 1839 Tanzimat reforms; between 1840 and 1880, the Jewish population of Palestine rose from 9,000 to 23,000.

In his extensive travels throughout Palestine in 1856, Louis Augustus Frankel conducted an in-depth population survey visiting all cities and villages in search of his Jewish brethren, and he placed their number at 10,689. According to Alexander Scholch, Palestine in 1850 had about 350,000 inhabitants, 30% of whom lived in 13 towns; roughly 85% were Muslims, 11% were Christians and 4% Jews.

The Ottoman census of 1878 indicated the following demographics for the three districts that best approximated what later became Mandatory Palestine; that is, the Mutasarrifate of Jerusalem, the Nablus Sanjak, and the Acre Sanjak. In addition, some scholars estimate approximately 5,000-10,000 additional foreign-born Jews at this time:

Group	Population	Percentage
Muslim citizens	403,795	86–87%
Christian citizens	43,659	9%
Jewish citizens	15,011	3%
Jewish (foreign-born)	Est. 5–10,000	1–2%
Total	Up to 472,465	100.0%

According to Ottoman statistics studied by Justin McCarthy, the population of Palestine in the early 19th century was 350,000, in 1860 it was 411,000 and in 1900 about 600,000 of which 94% were Arabs.

The estimated 24,000 Jews in Palestine in 1882 represented just 0.3% of the world's Jewish population. From 1882 to 1904, the Jewish population in Palestine doubled due primarily to the wave of immigration from Eastern Europe as part of the Zionist Aliyah.

1914 Ottoman census listed the following population figures:

			Muslims	Greek Orthodox	Greek Catholics	Jews	Total
Beirut vilayet	Acre Sanjak	Akka	31,610	3,923	4,311	106	40,665
Beirut vilayet	Acre Sanjak	Hayfa	23,338	881	2,553	1,099	28,802
Beirut vilayet	Acre Sanjak	Taberiye	8,328	150	244	3,060	13,054
Beirut vilayet	Acre Sanjak	Safed	22,356	324	2044	4,126	31,322
Beirut vilayet	Acre Sanjak	Nasıra	11,527	2371	1588		19,912
Beirut vilayet	Acre Sanjak	Total	97,159	9,503	10,740	8,351	133,755
Beirut vilayet	Nablus Sanjak	Nablus	74,500	1030		29	76,428
Beirut vilayet	Nablus Sanjak	Benissaab	35,787	18			35,809
Beirut vilayet	Nablus Sanjak	Cenin	40,589	755			41,657
Beirut vilayet	Nablus Sanjak	Total	150,876	1803		29	153,854
Jerusalem Sanjak		Kudüs-i Şerif	70,270	19,717	533	18,190	120,921
Jerusalem Sanjak		Yafa	62,758	5,312	553	2,105	72,206
Jerusalem Sanjak		Gazze	77,296	1006		243	78,597
Jerusalem Sanjak		Halil'ül-Rahman	55,720			721	56,444
Jerusalem Sanjak		Total	266,044	26,035	1,086	21,259	328,168
Total for the three sanjaks			514,079	36,741	11,826	29,639	615,777

Per McCarthy's estimate, in 1914 Palestine had a population of 657,000 Muslim Arabs, 81,000 Christian Arabs, and 59,000 Jews. McCarthy estimates the non-Jewish population of Palestine at 452,789 in 1882, 737,389 in 1914, 725,507 in 1922, 880,746 in 1931 and 1,339,763 in 1946.

Based on the work of Roberto Bachi, Sergio Della Pergola estimated that Palestine's population in 1914 was 689,000, comprising 525,000 Muslims, 94,000 Jews, and 70,000 Christians.

According to another estimate, the Jewish population in 1914 was 85,000 and subsequently fell to 56,000 in 1916–1919 as a result of World War I. During the war, the Ottoman authorities deported many Jews with foreign citizenship, while others left after they were presented with a choice of taking Ottoman citizenship or leaving Palestine. By December 1915 about 14% of the Jewish population had left, mainly for Egypt, where they awaited the war's end so they could return to Palestine.

According to Dr. Mutaz M. Qafisheh, the number of people who held Ottoman citizenship prior to the British Mandate in 1922 was just over 729,873, of which 7,143 were Jews. Qafisheh calculated this using population and immigration statistics from the 1946 Survey of Palestine, as well as the fact that 37,997 people acquired provisional Palestinian naturalization certificates in September 1922 for the purpose of voting in the legislative election, of which all but 100 were Jews. The 1922 census of Palestine lists 3,210 Christians as members of Armenian churches, 271 being Armenian Catholic (176 in Jerusalem-Jaffa, 10 in Samaria, and 85 in Northern) and 2,939 being Armenian Apostolic (11 in Southern, 2,800 in Jerusalem-Jaffa, eight in Samaria, and 120 in Northern) along with 2,970 Armenian speakers, including 2,906 in municipal areas (2,442 in Jerusalem, 216 in Jaffa, 101 in Haifa, four in Gaza, 13 in Nablus, one in Safad, 20 in Nazareth, 13 in Ramleh, one in Tiberias, 37 in Bethlehem, 25 in Acre, four in Tulkarem, 21 in Ramallah, six in Jenin, one in Beersheba, and one in Baisan).

== British Mandate era ==
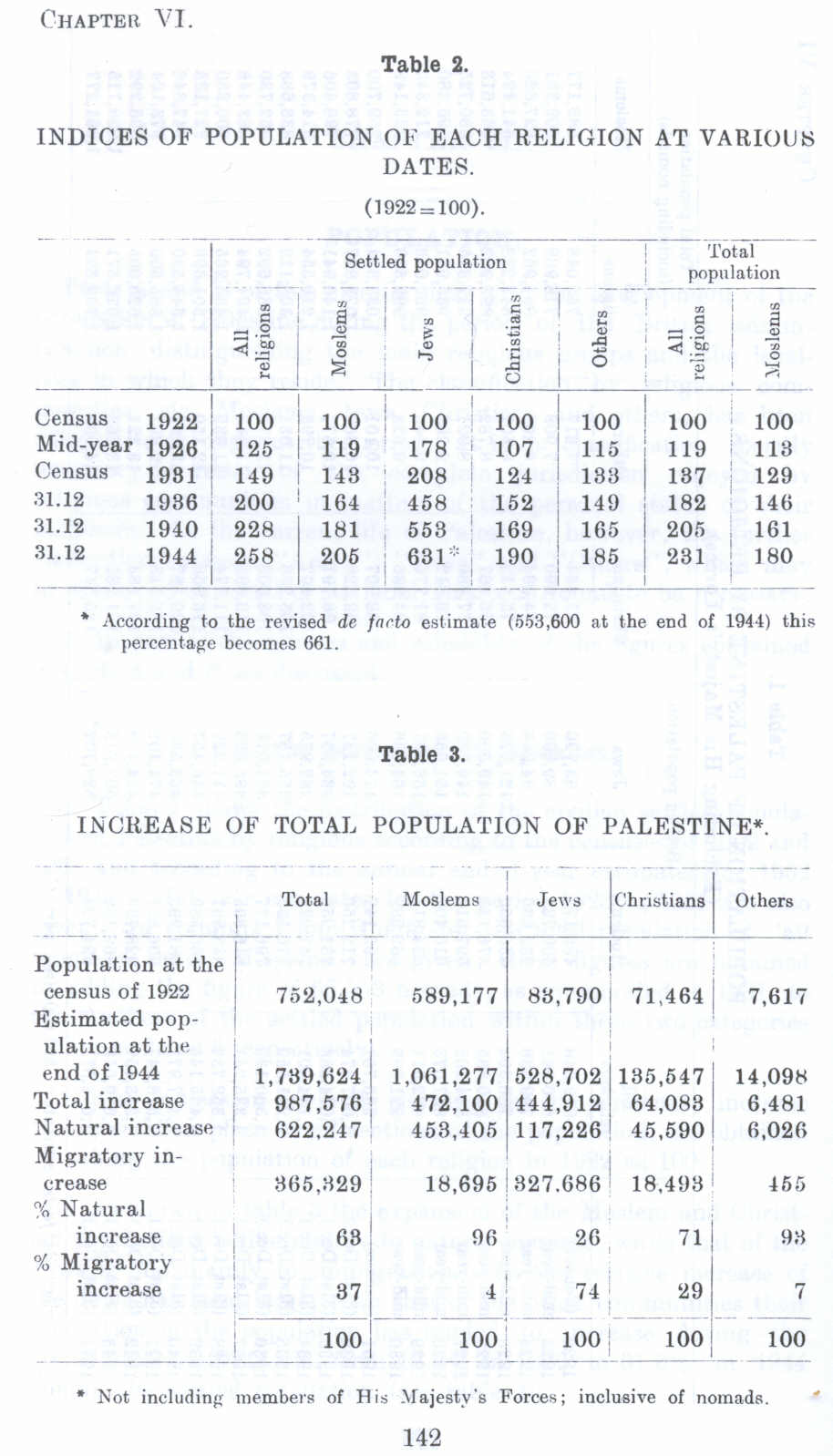
Survey of Palestine, showing the increase in population between 1922 and 1944

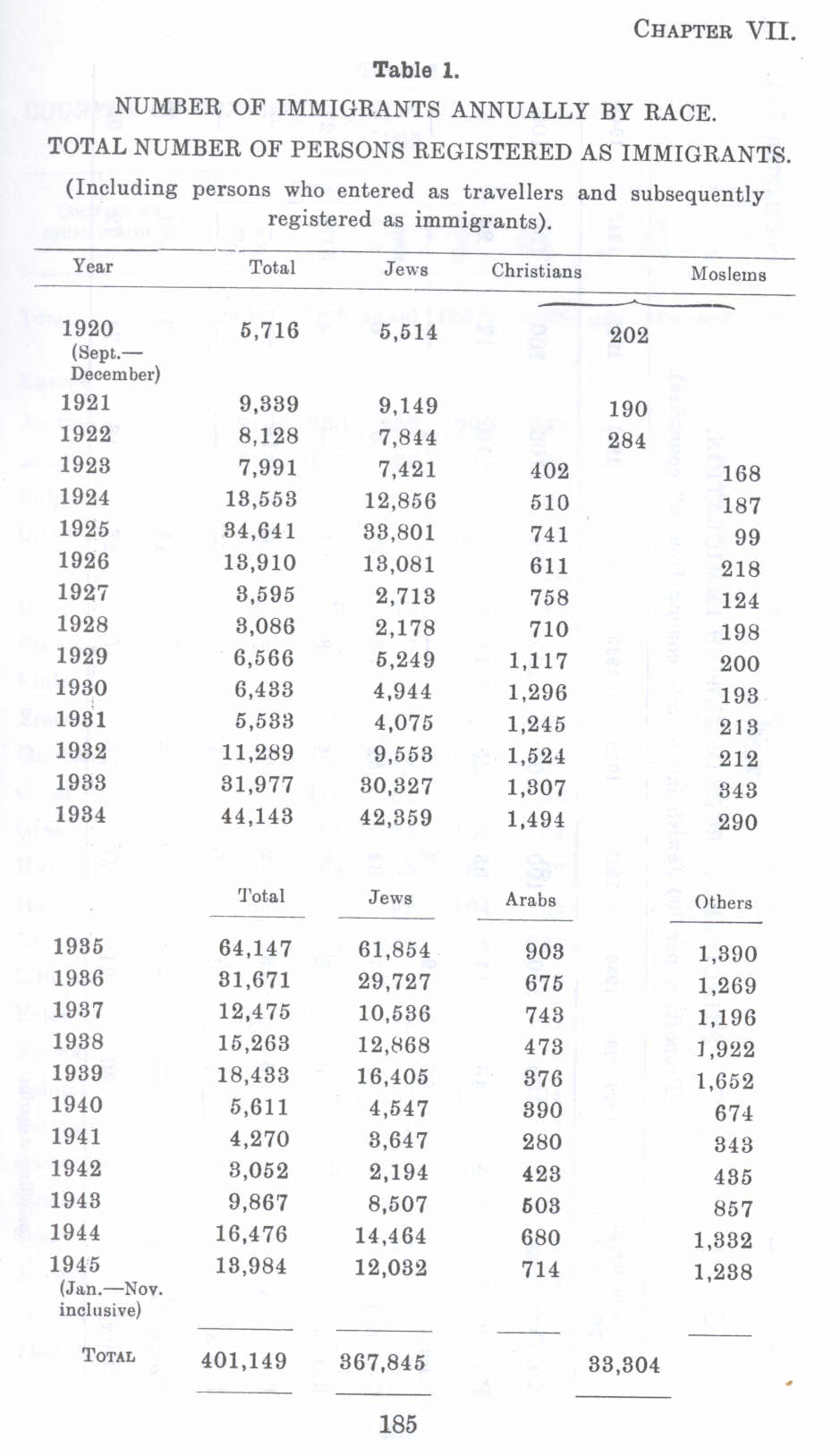
Survey of Palestine, showing immigration between 1922 and 1944

=== Official reports ===
In 1920, the British Government's Interim Report on the Civil Administration of Palestine stated that there were hardly 700,000 people living in Palestine:

There are now in the whole of Palestine hardly 700,000 people, a population much less than that of the province of Gallilee alone in the time of Christ. Of these 235,000 live in the larger towns, 465,000 in the smaller towns and villages. Four-fifths of the whole population are Moslems. A small proportion of these are Bedouin Arabs; the remainder, although they speak Arabic and are termed Arabs, are largely of mixed race. Some 77,000 of the population are Christians, in large majority belonging to the Orthodox Church, and speaking Arabic. The minority are members of the Latin or of the Uniate Greek Catholic Church, or—a small number—are Protestants. The Jewish element of the population numbers 76,000. Almost all have entered Palestine during the last 40 years. Prior to 1850 there were in the country only a handful of Jews. In the following 30 years a few hundreds came to Palestine. Most of them were animated by religious motives; they came to pray and to die in the Holy Land, and to be buried in its soil. After the persecutions in Russia forty years ago, the movement of the Jews to Palestine assumed larger proportions. Jewish agricultural colonies were founded. They developed the culture of oranges and gave importance to the Jaffa orange trade. They cultivated the vine, and manufactured and exported wine. They drained swamps. They planted eucalyptus trees. They practised, with modern methods, all the processes of agriculture. There are at the present time 64 of these settlements, large and small, with a population of some 15,000.

By 1948, the population had risen to 1,900,000, of whom 68% were Arabs, and 32% were Jews (UNSCOP report, including Bedouin).

Population of Palestine, 1922–1945
Year	Muslims	Christians	Jews	Total
1922	589,177	73,024	83,790	757,182
1931	759,717	91,398	174,610	1,035,821
1945	1,061,270	135,550	553,600	1,764,520

Report and general abstract of the Jewish agriculture was taken by the Palestine Zionist Executive in April 1927.

Object of the Census:

(p 85) Demography: to enumerate all Jewish inhabitants living in the agricultural and semi-agricultural communities.

(p 86) Number of Settlements: 130 places have been enumerated. If we consider the large settlements and the adjacent territories as one geographical unit, then we may group these places into 101 agricultural settlements, 3 semi-agricultural places (Affule, Shekhunath Borukhov and Neve Yaaqov) and 12 farms scattered throughout the country. In addition, there were a few places which, owing to technical difficulties, were not enumerated in the month of April. (Peqiin, Meiron, Mizpa and Zikhron David, numbering in the aggregate 100 persons).

Of these agricultural settlements, 32 are located in Judea, 12 in the Plain of Sharon, 32 are located in the Plain of Jesreel, 16 in Lower Galilee, and 9 in Upper Galilee. Most of them have a very small population – about one half being inhabited by less than 100 persons each. In 42 settlements there are from 100 to 500 persons, and in only five does the population exceed 1.000. viz.

Settlements	Persons
Pethah Tiqva	6,631
Rishon le-Ziyon	2,143
Rehovoth	1,689
Hadera	1,378
Zihron Yaaqov	1,260

(p 86) Number of Inhabitants: The aggregate population living in the agricultural and semi-agricultural places were 30.500.

	Male	Female
1 day – 10 years	3,298	3,188
11 years – 20 years	3,059	2,597
21 years – 30 years	5,743	4,100
31 years – 40 years	1,821	1,411
41 years – 50 years	1,011	0,922
Over 50 years and unknown	1,763	1,587
Total	16,695	13,805

Length of Residence in Palestine

(p 87 & p 98) The pre-war population accounts for 9,473 persons, which is slightly less than one-third of the present population, whereas the rest are post-war immigrants. Some 10.000 persons settled since 1924, since the so-called middle-class immigration.

Length of residence in Years	Men	Women	Children	Total	%
1	1504	1118	1746	4368	14.2
2	2406	2020	1575	6001	19.6
3	1311	913	1133	3357	11.5
4	695	556	720	1971	6.4
5	682	454	513	1649	5.4
6	856	403	390	1649	5.4
7	682	277	379	1358	4.3
8	139	45	261	445	1.5
9	39	10	200	249	0.8
10–13	237	218	893	1348	4.4
14–20	1882	1630	216	3728	12.1
21–29	864	800	-	1664	5.4
Over 30	836	930	-	1766	5.8
Unspecified	336	281	350	967	3.2
Total	12,469	9,655	8,376	30,500	100%

== Late Arab and Muslim immigration to Palestine ==
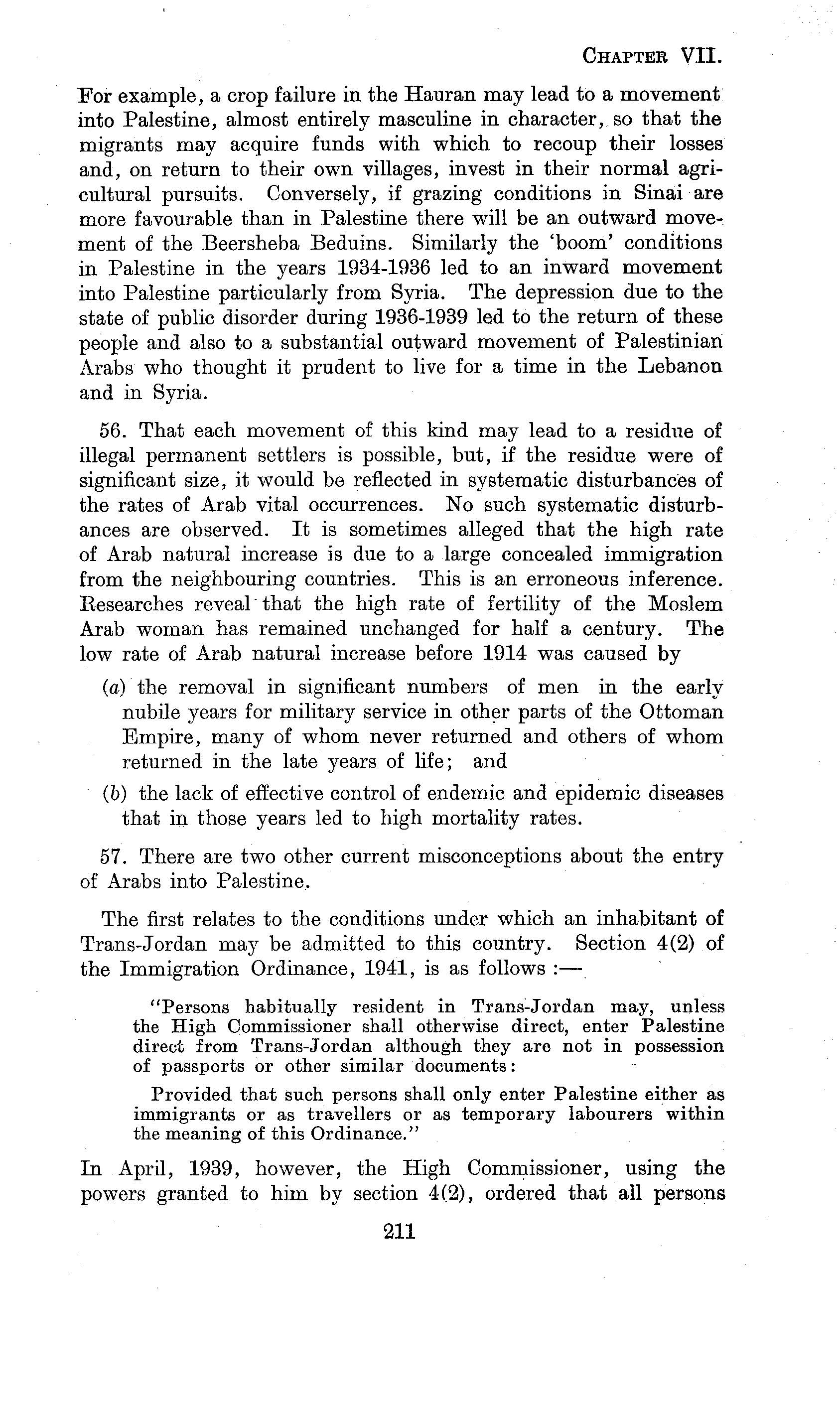
The "Survey of Palestine" of the British Government in Palestine, 1946, commenting on misconceptions around illegal Arab immigration

=== Ottoman period, 1800–1918 ===
At the end of the 18th century, there was a bi-directional movement between Egypt and Palestine. Between 1829 and 1841, thousands of Egyptian fellahin (peasants) arrived in Palestine fleeing Muhammad Ali Pasha's conscription, which he reasoned as the casus belli to invade Palestine in October 1831, ostensibly to repatriate the Egyptian fugitives. Egyptian forced labourers, mostly from the Nile Delta, were brought in by Muhammad Ali and settled in saknāt (neighborhoods) along the coast for agriculture, which set off bad blood with the indigenous fellahin, who resented Muhammad Ali's plans and interference, prompting the wide-scale Peasants' revolt in Palestine in 1834. After the Egyptian defeat and retreat in 1841, many laborers and deserters stayed in Palestine. Most of these settled and were quickly assimilated in the cities of Jaffa and Gaza, the Coastal plains and Wadi Ara. Estimates of Egyptian migrants during this period generally place them at 15,000–30,000. At the time, the sedentary population of Palestine fluctuated around 350,000. Palestine experienced a few waves of immigration of Muslims from the lands lost by the Ottoman Empire in the 19th century. Algerians, Circassians and Bosnians were mostly settled on vacant land and unlike the Egyptians they did not alter the geography of settlement significantly.

More recently, geographers Roy Marom and Avi Sasson argued that the notion of an “Egyptian migration” into Palestine is analytically misleading. Rather than constituting a coherent or external group, “Egyptians” functioned as a loose and heterogeneous identity category whose members were socially diverse and became integrated components of local rural society, settling within existing village systems and contributing to their expansion rather than forming a distinct or alien layer.

The Naqab desert further south preserved its Bedouin population, who had reportedly lived in the area since the 7th century. Many Bedouin tribes moved from the Hejaz and Transjordan in the 14th and 15th centuries. According to the 1922 census of Palestine, "The Ottoman authorities in 1914 placed the tribal population of Beersheba at 55,000, and since that date there has been a migration of tribes from the Hejaz and Southern Transjordan into the Beersheba area mainly as a result of succession of adequate rainfalls and of pressure exerted by other tribes east of the River Jordan." For 1922, the census gives a figure of 74,910 including 72,998 in the tribal areas.

Demographer Uziel Schmelz, in his analysis of Ottoman registration data for 1905 populations of Jerusalem and Hebron kazas, found that most Ottoman citizens living in these areas, comprising about one quarter of the population of Palestine, were living at the place where they were born. Specifically, of Muslims, 93.1% were born in their current locality of residence, 5.2% were born elsewhere in Palestine, and 1.6% were born outside Palestine. Of Christians, 93.4% were born in their current locality, 3.0% were born elsewhere in Palestine, and 3.6% were born outside Palestine. Of Jews (excluding the large fraction who were not Ottoman citizens), 59.0% were born in their current locality, 1.9% were born elsewhere in Palestine, and 39.0% were born outside Palestine.

=== British Mandate period, 1919–1948 ===
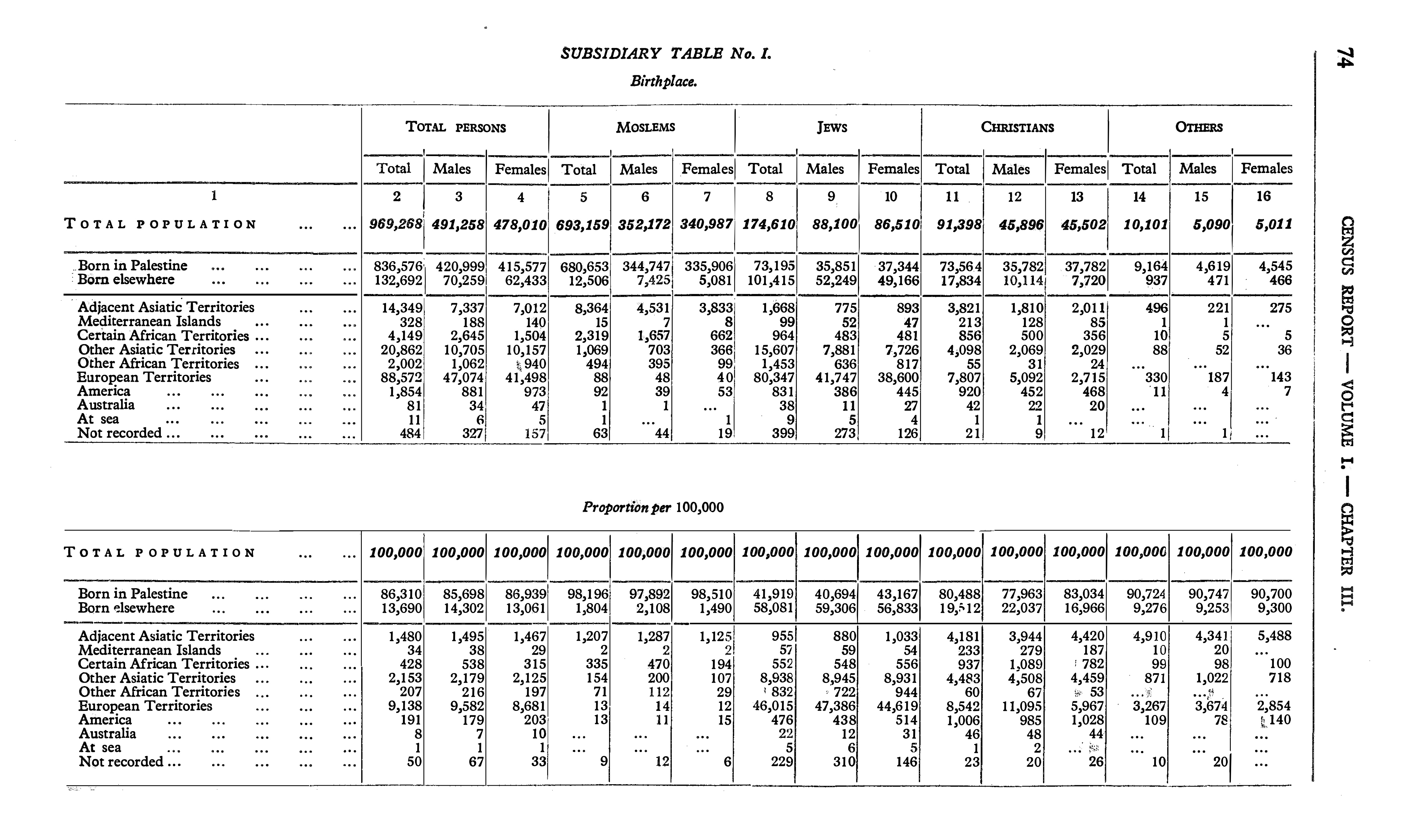
Mandatory Palestine population by birthplace from the 1931 census of Palestine. According to the census 98% of Palestinian Muslims were born in Palestine, compared to 80% of Christians and 42% of Jews.

According to Roberto Bachi, head of the Israeli Institute of Statistics from 1949 onwards, between 1922 and 1945 there was a net Arab migration into Palestine of between 40,000 and 42,000, excluding 9,700 people who were incorporated after territorial adjustments were made to the borders in the 1920s. Based on these figures, and including those netted by the border alterations, Joseph Melzer calculates an upper boundary of 8.5% for Arab growth in the two decades, and interprets it to mean the local Palestinian community's growth was generated primarily by natural increase in birth rates, for both Muslims and Christians.

Population of Palestine, 1922–1945
Year	Muslims	Christians	Jews	Total
1922	589,177	73,024	83,790	757,182
1931	759,717	174,610	91,398	1,035,821
1945	1,061,270	135,550	553,600	1,764,520

According to a Jewish Agency survey, 77% of Palestinian population growth in Palestine between 1914 and 1938, during which the Palestinian population doubled, was due to natural increase, while 23% was due to immigration. Arab immigration was primarily from Lebanon, Syria, Transjordan, and Egypt (all countries that bordered Palestine).

The overall assessment of several British reports was that the increase in the Arab population was primarily due to natural increase. These included the Hope Simpson Enquiry (1930), the Passfield White Paper (1930), the Peel Commission report (1937), and the Survey of Palestine (1945). However, the Hope Simpson Enquiry did note that there was significant illegal immigration from the surrounding Arab territories, while the Peel Commission and Survey of Palestine claimed that immigration played only a minor role in the growth of the Arab population. The 1931 census of Palestine considered the question of illegal immigration since the previous census in 1922. It estimated that unrecorded immigration during that period may have amounted to 9,000 Jews and 4,000 Arabs. It also gave the proportion of persons living in Palestine in 1931 who were born outside Palestine: Muslims, 2%; Christians, 20%; Jews, 58%. The statistical information for Arab immigration (and expulsions when the clandestine migrants were caught), with a contrast to the figures for Jewish immigration over the same period of 1936–1939, is given by Henry Laurens in the following terms

Palestinian immigration, 1936–1939

Jews	Arabs
69,716	2,267

Expulsions of illegals, 1937–1938

Jews	Arabs (et al.).
125	1,704

According to Mark Tessler, at least some of the Arab population growth was the result of immigration, mostly from the Sinai, Lebanon, Syria, and Transjordan, stimulated by the relatively favorable economic conditions in Palestine, but he noted differing opinions among scholars over how substantial it was. He cited one study as putting the Arab population growth attributable to immigration between 1922 and 1931 at 7%, meaning that 4% of the Arab population in 1931 was foreign-born, while noting another estimate put the growth in the Arab population attributable to immigration at 38.7%, which would mean that 11.8% of the Arab population in 1931 was foreign-born. Tessler wrote that "Israeli as well as Palestinian scholars have disputed this assertion, however, concluding that it is at best a theory and in all probability a myth."

In a 1974 study, demographer Roberto Bachi estimated that about 900 Muslims per year were detected as illegal immigrants but not deported. He noted the impossibility of estimating illegal immigration that was undetected, or the fraction of those persons who eventually departed. He did note that there was an unexplained increase in the Muslim population between 1922 and 1931, and he did suggest, though qualifying it as a "mere guess", that this was due to a combination of unrecorded immigration (using the 1931 census report estimate) and undercounting in the 1922 census.

While noting the uncertainty of earlier data, Bachi also observed that the Muslim population growth in the 19th century appeared to be high by world standards:

"[B]etween 1800 and 1914, the Muslim population had a yearly average increase of an order of magnitude of roughly 6–7 per thousand. This can be compared to the very crude estimate of about 4 per thousand for the "less developed countries" of the world (in Asia, Africa, and Latin America) between 1800 and 1910. It is possible that some part of the growth of the Muslim population was due to immigration. However, it seems likely that the dominant determinant of this modest growth was the beginning of some natural increase."

According to Justin McCarthy, "evidence for Muslim immigration into Palestine is minimal. Because no Ottoman records of that immigration have yet been discovered, one is thrown back on demographic analysis to evaluate Muslim migration." McCarthy argues that there was no significant Arab immigration into mandatory Palestine:

From analyses of rates of increase of the Muslim population of the three Palestinian sanjaks, one can say with certainty that Muslim immigration after the 1870s was small. Had there been a large group of Muslim immigrants their numbers would have caused an unusual increase in the population and this would have appeared in the calculated rate of increase from one registration list to another ... Such an increase would have been easily noticed; it was not there.

The argument that Arab immigration somehow made up a large part of the Palestinian Arab population is thus statistically untenable. The vast majority of the Palestinian Arabs resident in 1947 were the sons and daughters of Arabs who were living in Palestine before modern Jewish immigration began. There is no reason to believe that they were not the sons and daughters of Arabs who had been in Palestine for many centuries.

McCarthy also concludes that there was no significant internal migration to Jewish areas attributable to better economic conditions:

Some areas of Palestine did experience greater population growth than others, but the explanation for this is simple. Radical economic change was occurring all over the Mediterranean Basin at the time. Improved transportation, greater mercantile activity, and greater industry had increased the chances for employment in cities, especially coastal cities... Differential population increase was occurring all over the Eastern Mediterranean, not just in Palestine... The increase in Muslim population had little or nothing to do with Jewish immigration. In fact the province that experienced the greatest Jewish population growth (by .035 annually), Jerusalem Sanjak, was the province with the lowest rate of growth of Muslim population (.009).

Fred M. Gottheil has questioned McCarthy's estimates of immigration. Gottheil says that McCarthy didn't give proper weight to the importance of economic incentives at the time, and that McCarthy cites Roberto Bachi's estimates as conclusive numbers, rather than lower bounds based on detected illegal immigration.

Gad Gilbar has also concluded that the prosperity of Palestine in the 45–50 years before World War I was a result of the modernization and growth of the economy owing to its integration with the world economy and especially with the economies of Europe. Although the reasons for growth were exogenous to Palestine the bearers were not waves of Jewish immigration, foreign intervention nor Ottoman reforms but "primarily local Arab Muslims and Christians." However, Gilbar did attribute the rapid growth of Jaffa and Haifa in the final three decades of Ottoman rule in part to migration, writing that "both attracted population from the rural and urban surroundings and immigrants from outside Palestine."

Yehoshua Porath believes that the notion of "large-scale immigration of Arabs from the neighboring countries" is a myth "proposed by Zionist writers". He writes:

As all the research by historian Fares Abdul Rahim and geographers of modern Palestine shows, the Arab population began to grow again in the middle of the nineteenth century. That growth resulted from a new factor: the demographic revolution. Until the 1850s there was no "natural" increase of the population, but this began to change when modern medical treatment was introduced and modern hospitals were established, both by the Ottoman authorities and by the foreign Christian missionaries. The number of births remained steady but infant mortality decreased. This was the main reason for Arab population growth. ... No one would doubt that some migrant workers came to Palestine from Syria and Trans-Jordan and remained there. But one has to add to this that there were migrations in the opposite direction as well. For example, a tradition developed in Hebron to go to study and work in Cairo, with the result that a permanent community of Hebronites had been living in Cairo since the fifteenth century. Trans-Jordan exported unskilled casual labor to Palestine; but before 1948 its civil service attracted a good many educated Palestinian Arabs who did not find work in Palestine itself. Demographically speaking, however, neither movement of population was significant in comparison to the decisive factor of natural increase.

== Modern era ==
As of 2014, Israeli and Palestinian statistics for the overall numbers of Jews and Arabs in the area west of the Jordan, inclusive of Israel and the Palestinian territories, are similar and suggest a rough parity in the two populations. Palestinian statistics estimate 6.1 million Palestinians for that area, while Israel's Central Bureau of Statistics estimates 6.2 million Jews living in sovereign Israel. Gaza is estimated by the Israel Defense Forces (IDF) to have 1.7 million, and the West Bank 2.8 million Palestinians, while Israel proper has 1.7 million Arab citizens. According to Israel's Central Bureau of Statistics, as of May 2006, of Israel's 7 million people, 77% were Jews, 18.5% Arabs, and 4.3% "others". Among Jews, 68% were Sabras (Israeli-born), mostly second- or third-generation Israelis, and the rest are olim – 22% from Europe and the Americas, and 10% from Asia and Africa, including the Arab countries.

According to these Israeli and Palestinian estimates, the population in Israel and the Palestinian territories stands at from 6.1 to 6.2 million Palestinians and 6.1 million Jews. According to Sergio DellaPergola, if foreign workers and non-Jewish Russian immigrants in Israel are subtracted, Jews are already a minority in the land between the river and the sea. DellaPergola calculates that Palestinians as of January 2014 number 5.7 million as opposed to a "core Jewish population" of 6.1 million.

The Palestinian statistics are contested by some right-wing Israeli think-tanks and non-demographers such as Yoram Ettinger, who claim they overestimate Palestinian numbers by double-counting and counting Palestinians who live abroad. The double-counting argument is dismissed by both Arnon Soffer, Ian Lustick and DellaPergola, the latter dismissing Ettinger's calculations as 'delusional' or manipulated for ignoring the birth-rate differentials between the two populations (3 children per Jewish mother vs 3.4 for Palestinians generally, and 4.1 in the Gaza Strip). DellaPergola allows, however, for an inflation in the Palestinian statistics due to the counting of Palestinians who are abroad, a discrepancy of some 380,000 individuals.

=== Demographics of Israel ===
Ethnic makeup of the State of Israel (2019)
Ethnic group	percent
Jews and others	79%
Arabs	21%

The latest Israeli census was conducted by Israel Central Bureau of Statistics in 2019. Israeli census excludes the Gaza Strip. It also excludes all West Bank Palestinian localities, including those in Area C, while it includes the annexed East Jerusalem. It also includes all Israeli settlements in the West Bank. The census also includes the occupied Syrian territory of Golan Heights.

As per this census, the total population in 2019 was 9,140,473. Israel's population consists of 7,221,442 "Jews and others", and 1,919,031 Arabs, almost all of which Palestinians, with 26,261 in the Golan Subdistrict, being Syrian, mostly Druze, and a small number Alawite. The population includes the Druze community of Israel (i.e. not Syrian Druze) as well, who generally self-identify as Israeli, and are the only Arab-speaking community that has mandatory military service in the IDF.

=== Demographics of Palestine ===
The latest Palestinian census was conducted by Palestinian Central Bureau of Statistics in 2017. The Palestinian census covers the Gaza Strip and the West Bank, including East Jerusalem. The Palestinian census does not cover Israeli settlements in the West Bank including those in East Jerusalem. The census does not provide any ethnic or religious distinction. However, it is reasonable to assume that almost everyone counted is Palestinian Arab.

As per this census, the total population of the Palestinian territories was 4,780,978. The West Bank had a population of 2,881,687, whereas the Gaza Strip had a population of 1,899,291.

=== Combined demographics ===
counted by Palestinian Authority	counted by Israel
Israel counts Palestinians only in East Jerusalem + all Israelis; Palestinian Authority counts all residents	counted by both

Demographics of Israeli and Palestinian Territories
Region & Status	By nationality				Total Population	Year Source	By ethnoreligious group			Area (km^{2})
Region & Status	Israelis	Year Source	Palestinian Non-Israeli Citizens	Year Source	Total Population	Year Source	Jewish	Arab	Other	Area (km^{2})
West Bank Areas A & B (Occupied, partial Palestinian control)	0		1,828,115	2023	1,828,115	2023	0	1,828,115	0	
West Bank Area C (Occupied, full Israeli control) including Seam Zone	517,407	1/2024	300,000	2019	817,407	2019/ /-24	517,407	300,000	not specified separately	
East Jerusalem (Occupied/Annexed)	240,832 incl. Israeli Arab ~18,982	2021	370,552	2021	611,384	2021	221,850	389,534 incl. Israeli Arab ~18,982	not specified separately	
Total West Bank incl. East Jerusalem	758,239		2,498,667		3,256,906		739,257	2,517,649	not specified separately	5,880
Gaza Strip	0		2,226,544	2023	2,226,544	2023	0	2,226,544	0	365
Total Area of the Region of Palestine outside the Green Line										7,087
Green Line De facto 1949–1967 borders	8,289,657	2019/ -21/-3	0		8,289,657	2019/ -21/-3	6,787,743; 74%	1,299,484; 20%	554,000; 6%	20,582
Golan Heights (Occupied/Annexed)	53,000; Jews 27,000; Druze 24,000; Alawite 2,000	2021	0	2021	53,000	2021	27,000	26,000	0	1,154
Total Area of the State of Israel as defined by the Israeli CBS										22,072
CBS Total Population of Israel	9,471,448		370,552 (i.e. East Jerusalem Palestinians)		9,842,000	Dec. 2023	7,554,000	Israeli cit. 1,734,000; Non-Israeli ~370,552	554,000	
Total Israel + Palestine combined	9,471,448	derived	4,725,211	derived	14,833,110	Sum	7,554,000 (50.7%)	6,778,193 (45.5%); Israeli 1,734,000 (11.6%), Non-Israeli 5,044,193 (33.9%)	554,000 (3.7%)	25,650

=== Summary ===
Here is a summary chart of the above information without relying on color schemes:

Region		De facto status	Israeli census	Palestinian census	Population
Green Line		Israeli control	Yes	No	8,289,657
West Bank	East Jerusalem	Israeli control	Yes	Yes	611,384
West Bank	Area C	Israeli control	(Israelis only)	Yes	817,407
West Bank	Areas A and B	Israeli-Palestinian shared control	No	Yes	1,828,115
Gaza Strip		Palestinian control, Israeli-Egytian blockade	No	Yes	2,226,544
Golan Heights		Israeli control	Yes	N/A	53,000

=== Note: Israeli definitions ===
The definition of what constitutes the population of Israel varies depending on which territories are counted and which population groups are counted in each territory.

The Israel Central Bureau of Statistics ("CBS") definition of the Area of the State of Israel:

- includes East Jerusalem since 1967, which Israel unilaterally annexed
- includes the Golan Heights since 1982, which Israel unilaterally annexed
- excludes the West Bank other than East Jerusalem

The CBS' definition of the Population of Israel, however:

- includes non-Israeli Palestinians (as well as Israeli Arabs/Palestinians) in East Jerusalem who have permission to live there
- includes Israeli settlers and others with Israeli residency permits living in the Area C of West Bank
- excludes Palestinian/Arab/other residents of Area C and East Jerusalem who do not have Israeli citizenship or residence
- excludes persons who are not registered (from 2008 on) and/or entered illegally, and foreign workers

== Timeline ==
conflicting: some estimates conflict among different researchers

Overview of the demographics of the region of Palestine from the 1st century CE through 1947 (in thousands)
Year	Source	Jewish	Pagan	Samaritan	Christian	Muslim	Total	Driving events
0–100 (1st c.) CE	Bachi	Majority			...	n/a	1,000– 2,500	66–74 CE: First Jewish–Roman War, Roman Empire defeats Jews in 70 CE. Estimates of Jews killed or who died from famine and disease ranged from less than 300,000(Schwartz), to 600,000 (Tacitus) , to 1.1 million plus 97,000 captured and driven out.(Josephus); 132–135 CE: Bar Kokhba revolt by Jews against Romans; 580,000 Judean men killed in battles/raids. Others die from famine, disease and fire (Cassius Dio, Cotton, Raviv, Ben David); Raviv: Archeological evidence shows Jewish settlements in Judea almost completely eradicated by 135 CE. However, Jews lived on in Galilee.; Klein: In Galilee, Roman authorities replaced many Jews with Syrians, Phoenicians, and Arabians.
140 CE^{†}	Avi- Yohan	conflicting; 700-800	...	conflicting; "far fewer than 300,000"	...	n/a	conflicting; 2,500	
140 CE^{†}	Broshi	conflicting		conflicting		n/a	conflicting; <1,000 ("never more than 1 million")	
Early 300s	Stem- berger	Largest group	2nd- largest	3rd- largest	Smallest group	n/a	...	400, cities were majority non-Jewish, most land likely owned by non-Jews.; 400s: Western Roman Empire collapses, driving Christian immigration. Christianization. Christian majority by 500 CE. (Avi-Yonah)
300s	Bachi	Majority	...	...	Minority	n/a	"More than in 1st c."	400, cities were majority non-Jewish, most land likely owned by non-Jews.; 400s: Western Roman Empire collapses, driving Christian immigration. Christianization. Christian majority by 500 CE. (Avi-Yonah)
400s	Bachi	Minority	n/a	...	Majority	n/a	"More than in 1st c."	400, cities were majority non-Jewish, most land likely owned by non-Jews.; 400s: Western Roman Empire collapses, driving Christian immigration. Christianization. Christian majority by 500 CE. (Avi-Yonah)
500s			n/a	...		n/a		
628	Butler, Gil	>250	30-80		520-570		>950	629: Heraclius ordered massacre of Jews; ca. 150,000 left, many to Egypt. (Butler, Gil, Schäfer)
630s	Parkes	150– 400	n/a	...	...		...	635: As Byzantine rule ended and Muslim rule began: Parkes: Est. 150,000–400,000 Jews in all Palestine; Crown et al.: Palaestina Prima only, which did not include Galilee, had a population of 700,000, incl. 100,000 Jews and 30–80,000 Samaritans, with the remaining 520-570,000 Chalcedonian and Miaphysite Christians.; Gil: Jews and Samaritans together likely still formed a majority in 638; In the period after 638: Immigration of Arabs (i.e. from the Arabian Peninsula), how many is unclear; MFA Israel: Jews flourished at first; Umar encouraged Jews to settle in Jerusalem after 500-year ban.; 688–744 (–1033): Frequent plague recurrences and devastating earthquakes in 749, 881 and 1033) caused a steady decline of the population, falling from around 1 million in the 5th c. to a lowest estimate of 400–560,000 by 1096 (start of First Crusade).
700s			n/a	...				700s-800s: Civil wars drove Jewish emigration; 717: New taxes on and discrimination against Jews drove Jewish emigration; ~750-900: Mass Islamization with Muslim majority "visible" by ~966-985 (al-Maqdisi)
800s			n/a	...				868–905: Mass Islamization of Samaritans; 881: Acre earthquake
900s			n/a	...				
1095	Ellen- blum, Della- Pergola; Broshi		n/a	...			400– 560	1033: Jordan Rift Valley earthquake; 1096–1099 1st Crusade, Crusaders massacre and enslave Jews and Muslims. Most Jerusalem Jews killed in Siege of Jerusalem; 1099: Goitein: Jewish mass conversions to Islam were not widespread from 901–1265 except the persecution of Fatimid caliph al-Hakim bi-Amr Allah in 1099.; 1100: "By 1100 Jews had declined substantially", 1100s: Jews only about "1000 poor families". (Heynick); 1187: Saladin defeats Crusaders; his Ayyubid dynasty in power; some immigration of diaspora Jews; 1260: Mamluks take power, oppress Jews, grossly mismanage economy. Great social and economic decline. Large-scale Christian and Jewish emigration, but, trickle of Jewish immigration. Jews become an even smaller minority.; 1347: Black Death reaches Palestine.; 1517: Ottomans take power. About 5,000 Jews live in Palestine.
End; 1100s	Bachi	Minority	n/a	...	Minority	Majority	>225	
1300s	Bachi	Minority	n/a	...	Minority	Majority	150	
1533-9	Bachi	5	n/a	...	6	145	156	
1553-4	Bachi	7	n/a	...	9	188	205	
1690-1	Bachi	2	n/a	<0.2	11	219	232	
1800	Bachi	7	n/a	<0.2	22	246	275	1882-1903: First Aliyah about 35,000 Jews immigrate mostly from the Russian Empire and Romania. They join about 20-25,000 Jews in Palestine as of 1880.
1890	Bachi	conflicting; 43	n/a	<0.2	conflicting; 57	conflicting; 432	conflicting; 532	
1890-1	Ottoman census	conflicting; 18	n/a	<0.2	conflicting; 52	conflicting; 446	conflicting; 516	
1914	Bachi	94	n/a	<0.2	70	525	689	1904-1914: Second Aliyah, 35–40,000 Jews immigrate, most from the Russian Empire
1914-5	Ottoman census	39	n/a	<0.2	81	602	722	1919-1923: Third Aliyah about 40,000 Jews immigrate, mostly from Eastern Europe
1922	British census	84	n/a	<0.2	71	589	752	1924-8: Fourth Aliyah, about 80,000 Jews immigrate, about half from Poland, but also USSR, e Romania, Lithuania. 12% were from Yemen, Iraq, or elsewhere in West Asia.
1931	Bachi	175	n/a	<0.2	89	760	1,033	1929-1939: Fifth Aliyah, 250,000 Jews immigrate (of which 174,000 between 1933 and 1936). In 1936 British start to prohibit Jewish immigration.; 1933-1948: Aliyah Bet, about 110,000 Jews immigrate from Europe without British permission
1947	Bachi	630	n/a	<0.2	143	1,181	1,970	1929-1939: Fifth Aliyah, 250,000 Jews immigrate (of which 174,000 between 1933 and 1936). In 1936 British start to prohibit Jewish immigration.; 1933-1948: Aliyah Bet, about 110,000 Jews immigrate from Europe without British permission

^{†}including what is today the Kingdom of Jordan

== See also ==
- History of Palestine
- Demographic history of Jerusalem
- Demographics of Israel
- Demographics of the Palestinian territories
- Muslim history in Palestine
- History of the Jewish community in Palestine
- History of Christianity in Palestine
- Genetic history of the Middle East
- Travelogues of Palestine – for early travellers commenting on demographics
- Timeline of the Palestine region
- Time periods in the Palestine region
- Arab migrations to the Levant

== Bibliography ==
- Balfour, Alan (3 December 2012). Solomon's Temple: Myth, Conflict, and Faith. John Wiley & Sons. pp. 112–. ISBN 978-0-470-67495-6.
- Della Pergola, Sergio (2001). "Demography in Israel/Palestine: Trends, Prospects, Policy Implications" (PDF). International Union for the Scientific Study of Population, XXIV, General Population Conference, Salvador de Bahia. Archived from the original (PDF) on 2 December 2016.
- Bachi, Roberto (1974). The Population of Israel (PDF). Institute of Contemporary Jewry, Hebrew University of Jerusalem. pp. 133, 390–394.
- McCarthy, Justin (1990). The Population of Palestine: Population History and Statistics of the Late Ottoman Period and the Mandate. Columbia University Press. ISBN 978-0-231-07110-9.
- Jewish National Council (1947). "First Memorandum: historical survey of the waves of the number and density of the population of ancient Palestine; Presented to the United Nations in 1947 by Vaad Leumi on Behalf of the Creation of a Jewish State" (PDF). Archived from the original (PDF) on 8 March 2012.
- Jewish National Council (1947). "Second Memorandum: historical survey of the Jewish population in Palestine from the fall of the Jewish state to the beginning of zionist pioneering; Presented to the United Nations in 1947 by Vaad Leumi on Behalf of the Creation of a Jewish State" (PDF). Archived from the original (PDF) on 8 March 2012.
- Jewish National Council (1947). "Third Memorandum: historical survey of the waves of Jewish immigration into Palestine from the arab conquest to the first zionist pioneers; Presented to the United Nations in 1947 by Vaad Leumi on Behalf of the Creation of a Jewish State" (PDF). Archived from the original (PDF) on 8 July 2011.
- Forbes, Andrew, and Henley, David, People of Palestine (Chiang Mai: Cognoscenti Books, 2012), ASIN: B0094TU8VY
- Schäfer, Peter (2003). The History of the Jews in the Greco-Roman World. Psychology Press. ISBN 978-0-415-30585-3.
