= Indigeneity in the Israeli–Palestinian conflict =

The notion of indigeneity—the quality of being descended from the native or autochthonous inhabitants of a territory, especially a territory that has been colonized is contentious because it is often used in debates about political legitimacy in the Israeli–Palestinian conflict since the establishment of the modern State of Israel. Prior to 1948, neither historians nor politicians used the word "indigenous" to refer to any of the inhabitants of the land of Israel. This was also true when discussing any of the populations living throughout Asia. Whether or not Israeli Jews, Palestinians, or both groups of people may be considered indigenous peoples to the region of Palestine depends largely on one's definition of indigeneity, a concept that has no objective parameters. According to the United Nations, any group of people can self-identify as indigenous if they are socially, economically or politically different from the majority of the population of the country in which they live During the 21st century, many Zionists have advocated the view that Jews are the indigenous people of the Land of Israel. Advocates of the Palestinian cause often advocate the view that Palestinians are an occupied indigenous people and that Zionism is a form of settler colonialism.

Some observers consider both Jews and Palestinians to be indigenous; this is corroborated by various genetic studies that have shown that both peoples share a common ancient indigenous origin in the land.

== Background ==
Palestine demographics, 1st century through the Mandate. Figures in thousands, i.e. 100 represents 100,000, 1,000 represents 1,000,000. See also the detailed timeline
Year	Jews	Christians	Muslims	Total
1st c.	Majority	–	–	~2,500
4th c.	Majority	Minority	–	>1st c.
5th c.	Minority	Majority	–	>1st c.
End 12th c.	Minority	Minority	Majority	>225
14th c.	Minority	Minority	Majority	150
1533–1539	5	6	145	156
1553–1554	7	9	188	205
1690–1691	2	11	219	232
1800	7	22	246	275
1890	43	57	432	532
1914	94	70	525	689
1922	84	71	589	752
1931	175	89	760	1,033
1947	630	143	1,181	1,970
Estimates by Sergio DellaPergola (2001), drawing on the work of Bachi (1975). Figures in thousands.

The population of the region of Palestine, which approximately corresponds to modern Israel and Palestine, has varied in both size and ethnic composition throughout its history. Some see this demographic history as having implications in debates related to the matter of indigeneity in the region of Palestine and therefore political legitimacy in the Israeli–Palestinian conflict.

Studies of Palestine's demographic changes over the millennia have shown that a Jewish majority in the first century AD had changed to a Christian majority by the 3rd century AD, and later to a Muslim majority, which is thought to have existed in Mandatory Palestine (1920-1948) since at least the 12th century AD, during which the total shift to Arabic language was completed.

== Jews as indigenous ==
The Zionist claim to Palestine, over other proposals for a Jewish state, was based on the notion that Jews had a hereditary right to the land that outweighed the equivalent nationalist claims of the local Arabs. According to Mahmood Mamdani, the Knesset unanimously codified the notion of Jewish indigeneity in Israel legally with the 1950 Law of Return, which grants any Jewish person in the world citizenship upon entering the territory, whereas Palestinian Arabs, even if born in the recently established State of Israel to parents who had never left the territory, had to meet the criteria of the 1952 Citizenship Law.

Part of that claim is based on the length of Jewish settlement in Palestine, so debates on Palestinian archaeology and Biblical archaeology have often focused on establishing or refuting Jewish indigeneity in the land. Archaeologist Brett Kaufman notes that archaeological and epigraphic evidence corroborates Jewish indigeneity in ancient Israel comes from multiple independent ancient sources outside the Hebrew Bible. Examples he cites include a 9th-century Aramaic inscription known as the Tel Dan Stele, excavated in northern Israel, which references both a "King of Israel" and the "House of David," providing non-biblical attestations of the kingdoms of Israel and Judah as well as the Davidic dynasty. A Neo-Assyrian royal inscription dating to 701 BC names Hezekiah, king of Judah, and describes Jerusalem as his royal seat, corroborating the biblical account. Inscriptions excavated in Jerusalem name people who also appear in the biblical Book of Jeremiah as officials in the 6th-century BC royal court of Judah. He notes that Hebrew, the national language of the Jewish people, is an Iron Age development of Bronze Age Canaanite belonging to the Northwest Semitic language family native to the Levant, with documented continuous use spanning over three millennia. Finally, he notes that two passages in the Quran describe the Holy Land as promised to the Children of Israel and the people of Moses, an early Islamic acknowledgement of Jewish connection to the region.

In her 2012 book The Genealogical Science: The Search for Jewish Origins and the Politics of Epistemology, American anthropologist Nadia Abu El Haj traces the history of genetic studies of Jewish origins and the role of such studies in the construction of "cultural imaginations and political commitments" in relation to Zionism in the 1950s and 1960s, noting that in the early work of Israeli researchers, there was "a struggle to reconcile their belief in the biological unity-qua-shared historical origins of the Jews with the 'fact' of phenotypic evidence to the contrary." According to Abu El Haj, "Jews were presumed to be 'a people' descended from the Israelites who were exiled from ancient Palestine," a view she considers "crucial to the ideology of settler-nationhood—to an understanding of Jewish settlement in Palestine as a project of return—that formed the bedrock of the Israeli state."

Archaeologist Brett Kauffman listed several attempts within the Israeli–Palestinian conflict to deny Jewish indigeneity. One of these is "Temple Denial," the rejection of any historical Jewish connection to Jerusalem and of the existence of the Temples there. He also refers to the Khazar Myth, a theory invoked to deny Jewish indigeneity by claiming that Ashkenazi Jews are not descended from the ancient Israelites but from the medieval Khazars of the Caucasus region, despite its being a widely debunked conspiracy theory that has also been disconfirmed by genetic studies. Lastly, he identified the work of anthropologist Nadia Abu El-Haj as a notable example of academic denial of Jewish indigeneity. He argued that, when confronted with evidence she could not refute, the author dismissed the concept of objective facts. Her work later turned to Jewish genetics as another avenue for disputing Jewish ancestral connections to the region.

In his 2011 article "The Myth of Israel as a Colonialist Entity: An Instrument of Political Warfare to Delegitimize the Jewish State" Israeli statesman and political scientist Dore Gold, citing Moshe Gil's A History of Palestine: 634-1099, wrote that Jews (along with Samaritans) comprised a majority in the Southern Levant from the Roman period (63 BCE – 324 CE) until the Muslim conquest (c. 636–7 CE) and only began to diminish due to the institution of persecutions, such as the Jizya tax. Jews continued to live in the land without interruption, and those who left maintained cultural and religious ties with the land. In his view, Jews have "deep, indigenous roots" to the Land of Israel. As such, he says, the idea of Zionism as a colonial project should be rejected.

Ilan and Carol Troen say that both Jews and the international community historically viewed Jewish presence in the land as indigenous until relatively recently. According to them, Palestinian Arabs began adopting an "indigeneity argument" in the 1990s to position themselves as the sole legitimate indigenous population. They argue this shift involved a re-framing of Jews as foreign invaders through a settler-colonial paradigm. They assert that claims denying a connection between modern and historical Jews lack factual basis, characterizing such arguments as a form of supersessionism intended to challenge the legitimacy of the State of Israel.

According to anthropologists Rachel Z Feldman and Ian McGonigle, "Israeli settler organizations and allied American-Jewish lobbyists have responded to international condemnation of the occupation by mobilizing narratives of indigeneity, claiming sovereign and divine rights to the land." Major Zionist organizations including the Anti-Defamation League (ADL), the American Jewish Committee, and the Israel Action Network of the Jewish Federations of North America have stated that Jews are Indigenous to the Land of Israel.

In 2015, a proposal titled "Recognition of the Jewish People as Indigenous to the Land of Israel" was submitted and approved by a 51% vote in favor at the World Zionist Congress. The bill's author stated that the bill rejects "the core anti-Israel accusation that Jews are foreign colonialists in the country and instead affirms that the Jewish people have indigenous rights to live in their ancestral home." The proposal was opposed by the liberal Zionist organization J Street, the Reform movement's ARZA, and the Conservative movement's Mercaz USA, among other organizations.

Writing on the blog of the New Zealand Jewish Council in 2024, Ben Kepes has argued that "Indigeneity and colonialism" are "not useful metaphors for Israel", citing Jewish presence in the land for thousands of years.

== Palestinians as indigenous ==
Scholars who discuss Zionism as settler colonialism contend that Zionism involves processes of dispossession and displacement of the indigenous Palestinian Arab population, akin to other settler colonial contexts, such as those of to the creation and expansion of the United States, accomplished through the displacement or elimination of various Native American communities.

Palestinians represented the vast majority of the population of Palestine at the time of the imposition of the British Mandate. According to M. T. Samuel, because the Jewish community in Palestine, or the Yishuv, constituted only 10% of the population at the time of the 1923 implementation of the mandate under the authority of the League of Nations, Britain was legally obligated to provisionally recognize the right to national self-determination of the indigenous Palestinian population throughout the entirety of the territory, according to Article 22 of the Covenant of the League of Nations. By incorporating the call to "establish in Palestine a national home for the Jewish people" into the mandate document, the League of Nations codified the clause from the Balfour Declaration into international law. It thereby facilitated Zionist colonization, which Samuel argues represented a violation of this legal obligation under Article 22.

The International Work Group for Indigenous Affairs defines the Palestinian Bedouin as the Indigenous people of Palestine. The Native American and Indigenous Studies Association (NAISA) have stated that "[W]e strongly protest the illegal occupation of Palestinian lands and the legal structures of the Israeli state that systematically discriminate against Palestinians and other Indigenous peoples...We reaffirm this sentiment that recognizes the rights of Indigenous Palestinians when we demand an end to the illegal occupation of Palestinian lands and a free Palestine.

Jamal Nabulsi, a PhD candidate at the School of Political Science and International Studies at the University of Queensland, argues that Palestinian indigeneity is a "resistant identity" that is fundamentally defined as the "embodiment of the land of Palestine," meaning the land and the Palestinian body are ontologically inseparable. He contends that this indigeneity is a political relationship to the structure of settler colonialism rather than a measure of "cultural authenticity," maintaining that the connection to the land remains inextinguishable even for those outside Palestine. Nabulsi asserts that this collective indigeneity serves to unify a fragmented population against Zionist efforts to "erase" Palestinian presence. Ultimately, he frames this as the basis for an "Indigenous sovereignty" that rejects liberal state-building projects in favor of a radical decolonial future.

Historian Nur Masalha says, "The Palestinians share common experiences with other indigenous peoples who have had their narrative denied, their material culture destroyed and their histories erased or reinvented by European white settlers and colonisers."

The United Nations has referred to Palestinians as the "indigenous people of Palestine".

== Jews and Palestinians as indigenous ==
Some organizations, including the ADL and Center for World Indigenous Studies, have referred to both Jews and Palestinians as Indigenous to the Palestine region.

== Criticism of indigeneity rhetoric ==
AIJAC—the Australia/Israel & Jewish Affairs Council—has stated that "the claim Palestinians are indigenous in the same way Aboriginal Australians are indigenous is beyond ridiculous" and that "Jews are also not indigenous to the Land of Israel in the same prehistoric way that Aboriginal Australians are to Australia".

== See also ==
- Genetic studies on Jews
  - History of the Jews and Judaism in the Land of Israel
    - Temple denial
- Genetic studies on Palestinians
- Politics of archaeology in Israel and Palestine
- Politics of food in the Arab–Israeli conflict
- Zionism as settler colonialism
- Indigenous Coalition for Israel
- Jews Indigenous to the Middle East and North Africa
- Native American–Jewish relations

== Sources ==
- Alam, M. Shahid (November 9, 2009). Israeli Exceptionalism. New York, NY: Springer. ISBN 978-0-230-10137-1.
- Gorny, Yosef (1987). Zionism and the Arabs, 1882–1948: A Study of Ideology. Clarendon Press. ISBN 978-0-19-822721-2. Archived from the original on July 7, 2024.
- Masalha, Nur (2012). The Palestine Nakba: Decolonising History, Narrating the Subaltern, Reclaiming Memory. Zed Books. ISBN 978-1-84813-970-1.
- Shapira, Anita (1992). Land and Power: The Zionist Resort to Force, 1881–1948. Oxford University Press. ISBN 978-0-19-506104-8. Archived from the original on July 7, 2024.
- Slater, Jerome (2020). Mythologies Without End. Oxford University Press. ISBN 978-0-19-045908-6.
- Sternhell, Zeev (1999). The Founding Myths of Israel. Princeton, NJ.: Princeton University Press. ISBN 0-691-00967-8.
