= Jewish population by country =

World Jewish population by country

As of 2026, the world's core Jewish population (those identifying as Jews to the exclusion of all else) was estimated at 16.5 million, which is 0.2% of the 8.28 billion worldwide population. However, the "core Jewish" criterion faces criticism, especially in debates over the American Jewish population count, since it excludes the growing number of people who carry multiple ethnic and religious identities who may self-identify as Jews or qualify as Jewish under the Halakhic principle of matrilineal descent. Israel and the United States host the largest Jewish populations of 7.76 million and 6.30 million respectively. Other countries with core Jewish populations above 100,000 include France (438,500), Canada (398,000), the United Kingdom (312,000), Argentina (171,000), Russia (132,000), Germany (125,000), and Australia (117,200). In 1939, the core Jewish population reached its historical peak of 16.6 million or more. Due to the murder of almost six million Jews during the Holocaust, this number was reduced to 11 million by 1945. The core Jewish population grew to around 13 million by the 1970s and then recorded almost no growth until around 2005, due to low fertility rates and interfaith marriage by Jews. From 2005 to 2018, the world's core Jewish population grew 0.63% annually on average, while the world's population overall grew 1.1% annually in the same period. This increase primarily reflects rapid growth of Haredi and Orthodox populations.

== Trends ==
=== Israel and Palestine ===
Recent Jewish population dynamics are characterized by a continued steady increase in the Israeli population and flat or declining numbers in countries outside the Holy Land (the diaspora). Aliyah to Palestine began in earnest following the 1839 Tanzimat reforms; between 1840 and 1880, the Jewish population in Palestine rose from 9,000 to 23,000. In the late 19th century, 99.7% of the world's Jews lived outside the region, with Jews representing 2–5% of the Palestinian population. Through the phases of Aliyah, the Jewish population rose to 630,000 by the establishment of Israel in 1948. By 2014 this had risen to 6,135,000, while the population of the diaspora had dropped from 10.5 to 8.1 million over the same period. Current demographics of Israel are characterized by a relatively high fertility rate of 3 children per woman and a stable age distribution. The overall growth rate of Jews in Israel is 1.7% annually. The diaspora countries, by contrast, have low Jewish birth rates, an increasingly elderly age composition, and a negative balance of people leaving Judaism versus converting to Judaism. Immigration trends also favor Israel ahead of diaspora countries. The Jewish state has a positive immigration balance (called aliyah in Hebrew). Israel saw its Jewish numbers significantly buoyed by a million-strong wave of Aliyah from the former Soviet Union in the 1990s, and immigration growth has been steady (in the low tens of thousands) since then.

=== Rest of the world ===
In general, the modern English-speaking world has seen an increase in its share of the diaspora since the Holocaust and the foundation of Israel, while historic diaspora Jewish populations in Eastern Europe, North Africa, and the Middle East have significantly declined or disappeared. France continues to be home to the world's third largest Jewish community, at around 438,500, but has shown an increasingly negative trend. As a long-term trend, intermarriage has reduced its "core" Jewish population and increased its "connected" and "enlarged" Jewish populations. More recently migration loss to Israel amongst French Jews reached the tens of thousands between 2014 and 2017 following a wave of antisemitic attacks.

Roughly 85% of the global Jewish population of 16,570,000 is concentrated in two countries: Israel and the United States, which are the only nations with Jewish populations exceeding one million. Jews constitute 0.2% of the world's population. Outside of these two primary countries, the nations with the largest Jewish populations, in descending order, are France (438,500), Canada (350,000), the United Kingdom (300,000), Argentina (170,000), and Russia (120,000). Even though Jewish birth rates are similar to the global average, the overall population has grown more slowly because it is older on average. By 2010, about one in three Jews worldwide was aged 50 or above, giving Jews the largest proportion of older adults among major religious groups.

Jewish communities are highly concentrated geographically: 96% live in the ten countries with the largest Jewish populations, totaling 15.73 million people. About 830,500 Jews live elsewhere in the world. Today, roughly 27,000 Jews reside in Muslim-majority countries, mainly in Turkey (14,200), Iran (9,100), and Azerbaijan (5,000). In the Arab world, the biggest Jewish populations are found in Morocco (2,000), Tunisia (1,000), and the United Arab Emirates (500). Regionally, the Jewish population increased in the Middle East and North Africa (up 18% to nearly 7 million), and grew slightly in Asia-Pacific (2%) and North America (1%). It declined in sub-Saharan Africa (down 37% to 50,000), Latin America–Caribbean (down 12% to 390,000), and Europe (down 8% to 1.3 million). Despite these shifts, Jews remained a small and generally stable share of regional populations.

=== Debate over American numbers ===
The number of Jews in the United States has been much debated because of differences in counting methodology resulting in recurring discrepancies of a million or more people in reports. These methodology differences are detailed by Pew Research Center in a 2020 study which estimated there were 5.8 million adult Jews in the United States and 1.8 million children of at least one Jewish parent being raised as Jewish in some way, for a total of 7.5 million Jews, 2.5% of the national population. However, Pew noted that Hebrew University demographer Sergio Della Pergola, reviewing the same data and applying a narrower definition that counts children and adult Jews without religious affiliation only if they have two Jewish parents, determined that there were 4.8 million Jewish adults and 1.2 million Jewish children in the U.S. for a total of 6 million Jews, 2% of the national population. These numbers can be further complicated by applying the matrilineal descent principle from Halakha, with Pew noting that while only 4.8 million of the 5.8 million adults classified as Jews reported having a Jewish mother, a further 1.3 million adults classified as non-Jews of Jewish background reported that they did have a Jewish mother.

== By country ==
The percentage of the eligible Jewish population that is living in each country (top 13, 2018)
1. United States (50.0%)
2. Israel (31.0%)
3. France (3.00%)
4. Canada (3.00%)
5. Russia (3.00%)
6. Palestine (2.00%)
7. United Kingdom (2.00%)
8. Argentina (1.00%)
9. Germany (1.00%)
10. Australia (1.00%)
11. Brazil (1.00%)
12. Mexico (1.00%)
13. Ukraine (1.00%)

United States	12000
Israel	7299
France	750
Canada	700
Russia	600
Palestine	413
United Kingdom	410
Argentina	350
Germany	275
Ukraine	200
Brazil	180
Australia	155
Hungary	131
Other	805
Total: 24268
Eligible
Enlarged
Connected
Core
Jewish population by country (1,000s, 2020)

Below is a list of Jewish populations in the world by country. All data below, except for the National official population, are from the annual World Jewish Population (2020) report coordinated by demographer Sergio Della Pergola at the Hebrew University of Jerusalem as part of the American Jewish Year Book. The figures are primarily based on national censuses combined with trend analysis. Della Pergola reports figures for the four following definitions:

- Core Jewish population refers to those who consider themselves Jews to the exclusion of all else.
- Connected Jewish population includes the core Jewish population and additionally those who say they are partly Jewish or that have a Jewish background from at least one Jewish parent.
- Enlarged Jewish population includes the Jewish connected population and those who say they have a Jewish background but not a Jewish parent, and all non-Jews living in households with Jews.
- Eligible Jewish population includes all those eligible for immigration to Israel under its Law of Return.

Where available, the list additionally contains official statistics reported by individual nations and year of latest report as National official population.

=== Core, connected and enlarged population ===
Countries	Core population			Connected population			Enlarged population		
Countries	Total	pct	pmp	Total	pct	pmp	Total	pct	pmp
Israel (Note: Including East Jerusalem and the Golan Heights.)	7,466,200	49	729,090	7,746,200	42	754,238	8,001,300	37	779,386
United States	5,700,000	37	17,320	8,000,000	43	24,309	10,000,000	46	30,386
France (Note: Figures includes France and Monaco. See: History of the Jews in France and History of the Jews in Monaco.)	550,000	3.6	9,400	650,000	3.5	8,483	750,000	3.5	10,026
Palestine (Note: Includes West Bank. As of 2020, Gaza Strip has no recorded Jewish population.)	505,300	3.3	6,910	511,400	2.8	8,483	517,407	2.4	10,026
Canada	393,000	2.6	10,500	450,000	2.4	12,023	550,000	2.6	14,695
United Kingdom (Note: Including the Channel Islands and the Isle of Man.)	292,000	1.9	4,370	330,000	1.8	4,939	370,000	1.7	5,537
Argentina	180,500	1.2	3,990	260,000	1.4	5,779	330,000	1.5	6,891
Russia	155,000	1.0	1,060	320,000	1.7	2,188	460,000	2.1	3,146
Australia	118,000	0.77	4,660	130,000	0.70	5,134	145,000	0.67	5,726
Germany	118,000	0.77	1,420	150,000	0.81	1,805	225,000	1.0	2,708
Brazil	107,000	0.70	440	120,000	0.65	574	150,000	0.70	717
Mexico	67,000	0.44	320	75,000	0.40	360	80,000	0.37	400
South Africa	52,300	0.34	890	65,000	0.35	1,106	75,000	0.35	1,276
Hungary	47,200	0.31	4,830	75,000	0.40	7,675	100,000	0.46	10,233
Ukraine	45,000	0.29	1,070	90,000	0.48	2,140	140,000	0.65	3,329
Netherlands	29,800	0.20	1,250	43,000	0.23	1,563	53,000	0.25	2,188
Belgium	29,000	0.19	2,530	35,000	0.19	3,053	40,000	0.19	3,490
Italy	27,000	0.18	450	34,000	0.18	560	41,000	0.19	676
Switzerland	18,500	0.12	2,160	22,000	0.12	2,569	25,000	0.12	2,919
Uruguay	16,000	0.10	4,800	20,000	0.11	5,685	24,000	0.11	6,822
Chile	16,000	0.10	840	20,000	0.11	1,050	24,000	0.11	1,260
Nigeria	15,000	0.098	61.9	30,000	0.16	1,947	30,000	0.14	123.8
Sweden	15,000	0.098	1,460	20,000	0.11	1,947	25,000	0.12	2,433
Turkey	14,500	0.095	180	19,000	0.10	234	21,000	0.098	259
Spain	13,000	0.085	280	16,000	0.086	345	19,000	0.088	409
Austria	10,300	0.067	1,160	14,000	0.075	1,577	17,000	0.079	1,915
Panama	10,000	0.065	2,370	11,000	0.059	2,607	12,000	0.056	2,844
Iran	9,500	0.062	110	10,500	0.056	122	12,000	0.056	139
Romania	8,900	0.058	460	13,000	0.070	672	17,000	0.079	879
Belarus	8,500	0.056	900	17,000	0.091	1,800	25,000	0.12	2,647
New Zealand	7,500	0.049	1,510	8,500	0.046	1,711	9,500	0.044	1,913
Azerbaijan	7,200	0.047	720	10,500	0.056	1,050	15,500	0.072	1,550
Denmark	6,400	0.042	1,100	7,500	0.040	1,289	8,500	0.039	1,461
United Arab Emirates	6,250	0.041		8,800	0.047		10,000	0.046	
Venezuela	6,000	0.039	210	10,000	0.054	350	12,000	0.056	420
India	4,800	0.031	3	6,000	0.032	4	7,500	0.035	5
Latvia	4,500	0.029	2,350	8,000	0.043	4,178	12,000	0.056	6,267
Poland	4,500	0.029	120	7,000	0.038	187	10,000	0.046	267
Greece	4,100	0.027	380	5,200	0.028	482	6,000	0.028	556
Czech Republic	3,900	0.026	370	5,000	0.027	474	6,500	0.030	617
Portugal	3,300	0.022	296	3,500	0.019	334	4,000	0.019	382
China (Note: Figures include mainland China and Hong Kong SAR. See: History of the Jews in China and History of the Jews in Hong Kong.)	3,000	0.020	2	3,200	0.017	2	3,400	0.016	2
Uzbekistan	2,900	0.019	90	6,000	0.032	186	8,000	0.037	248
Ireland	2,700	0.018	550	3,600	0.019	733	5,000	0.023	1,019
Slovakia	2,600	0.017	480	3,600	0.019	665	4,600	0.021	849
Kazakhstan	2,500	0.016	140	4,800	0.026	269	6,500	0.030	364
Costa Rica	2,500	0.016	490	2,800	0.015	549	3,100	0.014	608
Lithuania	2,400	0.016	860	4,700	0.025	1,684	7,500	0.035	2,688
Colombia	2,100	0.014	40	2,800	0.015	53	3,500	0.016	67
Morocco	2,100	0.014	60	2,500	0.013	71	2,800	0.013	80
Bulgaria	2,000	0.013	290	4,000	0.022	580	6,000	0.028	870
Moldova	1,900	0.012	540	3,800	0.020	1,080	7,500	0.035	2,132
Estonia	1,900	0.012	1,430	2,700	0.015	2,032	3,500	0.016	2,634
Peru	1,900	0.012	60	2,400	0.013	76	3,000	0.014	95
Croatia	1,700	0.011	420	2,400	0.013	593	3,100	0.014	766
Georgia	1,500	0.0098	380	3,000	0.016	760	5,000	0.023	1,267
Puerto Rico	1,500	0.0098	490	2,000	0.011	653	2,500	0.012	817
Serbia	1,400	0.0092	200	2,100	0.011	300	2,800	0.013	400
Finland	1,300	0.0085	240	1,600	0.0086	295	1,900	0.0088	351
Norway	1,300	0.0085	240	1,600	0.0086	295	2,000	0.0093	369
Paraguay	1,100	0.0072	150	1,300	0.0070	177	1,600	0.0074	218
Tunisia	1,000	0.0065	90	1,200	0.0065	108	1,400	0.0065	126
Japan	1,000	0.0065	10	1,200	0.0065	12	1,400	0.0065	14
Guatemala	900	0.0059	50	1,200	0.0065	67	1,500	0.0070	83
Singapore	900	0.0059	160	1,000	0.0054	178	1,200	0.0056	213
Gibraltar	800	0.0052	22,860	900	0.0048	25,718	1,000	0.0046	28,575
Luxembourg	700	0.0046	1,130	900	0.0048	1,453	1,100	0.0051	1,776
Ecuador	600	0.0039	30	800	0.0043	40	1,000	0.0046	50
Bolivia	500	0.0033	40	700	0.0038	56	900	0.0042	72
Bosnia and Herzegovina	500	0.0033	140	800	0.0043	224	1,100	0.0051	308
Cuba	500	0.0033	40	1,000	0.0054	80	1,500	0.0070	120
U.S. Virgin Islands	500	0.0033	3,810	600	0.0032	5,715	700	0.0033	6,668
Jamaica	500	0.0033	180	300	0.0016	108	400	0.0019	144
Kyrgyzstan	400	0.0026	60	700	0.0038	105	1,000	0.0046	150
Netherlands Antilles	400	0.0026	1,250	500	0.0027	1,563	700	0.0033	2,188
Kenya	300	0.0020	10	500	0.0027	17	700	0.0033	23
Cyprus	300	0.0020	240	400	0.0022	320	500	0.0023	400
Nicaragua	250	0.0016	37	250	0.0013	37	250	0.0012	37
Bahamas	200	0.0013	510	500	0.0027	1,275	700	0.0033	1,785
Suriname	200	0.0013	330	400	0.0022	660	600	0.0028	990
Thailand	200	0.0013	3	300	0.0016	4	400	0.0019	6
Turkmenistan	200	0.0013	30	400	0.0022	60	600	0.0028	90
Zimbabwe	200	0.0013	10	400	0.0022	20	600	0.0028	30
Armenia	100	0.00065	30	300	0.0016	90	500	0.0023	150
Bermuda	100	0.00065	1,540	200	0.0011	3,080	300	0.0014	4,620
Botswana	100	0.00065	40	200	0.0011	80	300	0.0014	120
DR Congo	100	0.00065	1	200	0.0011	2	300	0.0014	3
Barbados	100	0.00065	350	200	0.0011	700	300	0.0014	1,050
Dominican Republic	100	0.00065	10	200	0.0011	20	300	0.0014	30
Egypt	100	0.00065	1	200	0.0011	2	300	0.0014	3
El Salvador	100	0.00065	20	200	0.0011	40	300	0.0014	60
Ethiopia	100	0.00065	1	500	0.0027	4	1,000	0.0046	8
Indonesia	100	0.00065	0	200	0.0011	1	300	0.0014	1
Malta	100	0.00065	200	200	0.0011	400	300	0.0014	600
Namibia	100	0.00065	40	200	0.0011	80	300	0.0014	120
North Macedonia	100	0.00065	50	200	0.0011	100	300	0.0014	150
Madagascar	100	0.00065	3	200	0.0011	7	300	0.0014	10
Philippines	100	0.00065	1	200	0.0011	2	300	0.0014	3
Slovenia	100	0.00065	50	200	0.0011	100	300	0.0014	150
South Korea	100	0.00065	2	200	0.0011	4	300	0.0014	6
Tajikistan	100	0.00065	4	200	0.0011	9	300	0.0014	13
Taiwan	100	0.00065	4	200	0.0011	9	300	0.0014	13
World	15,277,300	100	1,920	18,591,750	100	2,341	21,532,950	100	2,727

=== Eligible population and national official ===
Countries	Eligible population			National official	
Countries	Total	pct	pmp	Total	Year
United States	12,000,000	50	36,463	6,300,000	2024
Israel (Note: Including East Jerusalem and the Golan Heights.)	7,299,300	31	779,386	7,200,000	2024
France (Note: Figures includes France and Monaco. See: History of the Jews in France and History of the Jews in Monaco.)	750,000	3.2	11,568	—N/a	—N/a
Canada	700,000	2.9	18,702	398,000	2024
Russia	600,000	2.5	4,103	157,673	2010
Palestine (Note: Includes West Bank. As of 2020, Gaza Strip has no recorded Jewish population.)	442,700	1.9	80,734	—N/a	—N/a
United Kingdom (Note: Including the Channel Islands and the Isle of Man.)	410,000	1.7	6,136	312,000	2024
Argentina	360,000	1.5	8,002	—N/a	—N/a
Germany	275,000	1.2	3,309	83,430	2011
Ukraine	200,000	0.84	4,756	103,878	2001
Brazil	180,000	0.76	861	107,329	2011
Australia	160,000	0.67	6,319	99,956	2021
Hungary	130,000	0.55	13,303	10,965	2011
South Africa	85,000	0.36	1,446	49,469	2016
Mexico	65,000	0.27	520	67,476	2010
Netherlands	63,000	0.26	2,813	0.1%	2016
Italy	48,000	0.20	791	—N/a	—N/a
Belgium	45,000	0.19	3,926	—N/a	—N/a
Belarus	33,000	0.14	3,494	13,705	2019
Sweden	30,000	0.13	2,920	—N/a	—N/a
Switzerland	28,000	0.12	3,269	16,763	2011
Uruguay	28,000	0.12	7,959	—N/a	—N/a
Chile	28,000	0.12	1,470	28,153	2024
Turkey	23,000	0.097	284	—N/a	—N/a
Spain	22,000	0.092	474	—N/a	—N/a
Azerbaijan	20,500	0.086	2,050	9,084	2009
Austria	20,000	0.084	2,252	8,140	2001
Romania	20,000	0.084	1,034	3,519	2011
Latvia	16,000	0.067	8,356	8,210	2019
Venezuela	14,000	0.059	490	9,500	2010
Panama	13,000	0.055	3,081	—N/a	—N/a
Iran	13,000	0.055	151	9,826	2016
Poland	13,000	0.055	347	2,488	2011
New Zealand	10,500	0.044	2,114	5,274	2018
Lithuania	10,500	0.044	3,763	1,229	2011
Uzbekistan	10,000	0.042	310	94,689	1989
Moldova	10,000	0.042	2,842	1,601	2014
Denmark	9,500	0.040	1,633	—N/a	—N/a
Kazakhstan	9,500	0.040	532	5,281	2009
India	9,000	0.038	6	4,650	2011
Czech Republic	8,000	0.034	759	1,427	2021
Bulgaria	8,000	0.034	1,160	1,162	2011
Georgia	7,500	0.032	1,900	1,417	2014
Uganda	—N/a	—N/a	—N/a	7,189	2014
Greece	7,000	0.029	649	—N/a	—N/a
Ireland	6,500	0.027	1,324	1,921	2016
Slovakia	6,000	0.025	1,108	601	2019
Portugal	5,000	0.021	478	2,910 – 15,000	2021
Colombia	4,500	0.019	86	—N/a	—N/a
Estonia	4,500	0.019	3,387	1,921	2019
Croatia	3,800	0.016	939	536	2011
China (Note: Figures include mainland China and Hong Kong SAR. See: History of the Jews in China and History of the Jews in Hong Kong.)	3,600	0.015	3	—N/a	—N/a
Peru	3,500	0.015	111	—N/a	—N/a
Serbia	3,500	0.015	500	578	2011
Costa Rica	3,400	0.014	666	—N/a	—N/a
Morocco	3,100	0.013	89	—N/a	—N/a
Puerto Rico	3,000	0.013	980	—N/a	—N/a
Norway	2,500	0.011	462	761	2021
Ethiopia	2,500	0.011	20	—N/a	—N/a
Finland	2,200	0.0092	406	1,093	2017
Cuba	2,000	0.0084	160	—N/a	—N/a
Paraguay	1,900	0.0080	259	1,100	2002
Guatemala	1,800	0.0076	100	—N/a	—N/a
Tunisia	1,600	0.0067	144	—N/a	—N/a
Japan	1,600	0.0067	16	—N/a	—N/a
Kyrgyzstan	1,500	0.0063	225	455	2018
Singapore	1,400	0.0059	249	—N/a	—N/a
Bosnia and Herzegovina	1,400	0.0059	392	262	2013
Luxembourg	1,300	0.0055	2,099	—N/a	—N/a
Ecuador	1,200	0.0050	60	—N/a	—N/a
Gibraltar	1,100	0.0046	31,433	763	2012
Bolivia	1,100	0.0046	88	—N/a	—N/a
Bahamas	900	0.0038	2,295	191	2010
Kenya	900	0.0038	30	—N/a	—N/a
Netherlands Antilles	900	0.0038	2,813	—N/a	—N/a
U.S. Virgin Islands	800	0.0034	7,620	—N/a	—N/a
Suriname	800	0.0034	1,320	181	2012
Turkmenistan	800	0.0034	120	1,537	1995
Zimbabwe	800	0.0034	40	—N/a	—N/a
Armenia	700	0.0029	210	127	2011
Cyprus	600	0.0025	480	—N/a	—N/a
Jamaica	500	0.0021	180	506	2011
Thailand	500	0.0021	7	—N/a	—N/a
Bermuda	400	0.0017	6,160	135	2010
Botswana	400	0.0017	160	—N/a	—N/a
DR Congo	400	0.0017	4	—N/a	—N/a
Barbados	400	0.0017	1,400	103	2011
Dominican Republic	400	0.0017	40	—N/a	—N/a
Egypt	400	0.0017	4	—N/a	—N/a
El Salvador	400	0.0017	80	—N/a	—N/a
Indonesia	400	0.0017	1	—N/a	—N/a
Malta	400	0.0017	800	—N/a	—N/a
Namibia	400	0.0017	160	—N/a	—N/a
Nigeria	400	0.0017	2	—N/a	—N/a
North Macedonia	400	0.0017	200	66	2021
Madagascar	400	0.0017	13	—N/a	—N/a
Philippines	400	0.0017	4	—N/a	—N/a
Slovenia	400	0.0017	200	99	2001
South Korea	400	0.0017	8	—N/a	—N/a
Tajikistan	400	0.0017	18	—N/a	—N/a
Taiwan	400	0.0017	17	—N/a	—N/a
Aruba	—N/a	—N/a	—N/a	354	2018
Nicaragua	250	0.0011	37	181	2017
Iceland	—N/a	—N/a	—N/a	65	2025
Mauritius	—N/a	—N/a	—N/a	43	2018
Syria	—N/a	—N/a	—N/a	38	2020
Liechtenstein	—N/a	—N/a	—N/a	26	2020
Anguilla	—N/a	—N/a	—N/a	16	2018
Faroe Islands	—N/a	—N/a	—N/a	12	2020
Montenegro	—N/a	—N/a	—N/a	12	2018
British Virgin Islands	—N/a	—N/a	—N/a	11	2018
	—N/a	—N/a	—N/a	1	2018
World	23,809,100	100	3,091	—N/a	—N/a

pct = percent of total world Jewish population
pmp = per million people in country

=== Remnant and vanished populations ===
The above table represents Jews that number at least a few dozen per country. Reports exist of Jewish communities remaining in other territories in the low single digits that are on the verge of disappearing, particularly in the Islamic world, as their part and parcel of their reaction to the Israeli declaration of Independence was the Jewish persecution in most Muslim lands; these are often of historical interest as they represent the remnant of much larger Jewish populations. For example, Egypt had a Jewish community of 80,000 in the early 20th century that numbered fewer than 40 as of 2014, mainly because of the forced expulsion movements to Israel and other countries at that time. Despite a 2,000-year history of Jewish presence, there are no longer any known Jews living in Afghanistan, as its last Jewish residents Zebulon Simintov and Tova Moradi, fled the country in September and October 2021, respectively.

In the Syrian Arab republic, another Jewish community saw mass exodus at the end of the 20th century and numbered fewer than 20 in the midst of the Syrian Civil War. The size of the Jewish community in Indonesia has been variously given as 65, 100, or 18 at most over the last 50 years. Due to the Yemenite civil war (2014–present), the Yemeni Jews have faced persecution by various radical Islamist, Jihadist organizations including Houthis, AQAP and ISIS-Yemen who have demanded they convert to Islam, pay the Jizya tax and survive or face execution. The Israel Defense Forces has conducted operations evacuating the population and moving them to Israel. On 28 March 2021, 13 Jews were forced by the Houthis to leave Yemen, leaving the last four elderly Jews in Yemen. According to one report, there are six Jews left in Yemen: one woman, her brother, three others, and Levi Salem Marahbi (who had been imprisoned for helping smuggle a Torah scroll out of Yemen).

== See also ==
- Aliyah
- Historical Jewish population
- Historical Jewish population by country
- Jewish ethnic divisions
- Judaism
- Judaism by country
- Jewish population by city
