= 881 Acre earthquake =

Coordinates: 32.928°N 35.085°E

The 881 Acre earthquake took place in the vicinity of Acre in 881 (Hijri year 268). Alexandria was reportedly affected by the same earthquake.

According to the geophysicist August Heinrich Sieberg (1875–1945), the earthquake caused a seismic sea wave (tsunami). The tsunami affected mainly the city of Acre (Acca) and its vicinity, where it caused much damage. Sieberg's main source on the subject was the geologist Bailey Willis (1857–1949), who in turn cited the physician Joseph Désiré Tholozan (1820–1897) as his source on the historical earthquake.

Tholozan's account estimates the earthquake to have taken place in either 881 or 882. In addition to Acre, other areas affected by seismic waves were reportedly the coast of Alexandria, and the coasts of the Syria region. The narrative also mentions that the earthquake causes similar waves in the river Nile.

Tholozan's account is nearly identical to the description of the 1303 Crete earthquake (Hijri year 702), which also affected Alexandria. The journal Annals of Geophysics has raised doubts on the historicity of this earthquake, suggesting that Tholozan had misdated the events depicted in the narrative.
