= Roberto Bachi =

Italian statistician (1909–1995)

- רוברטו בקי
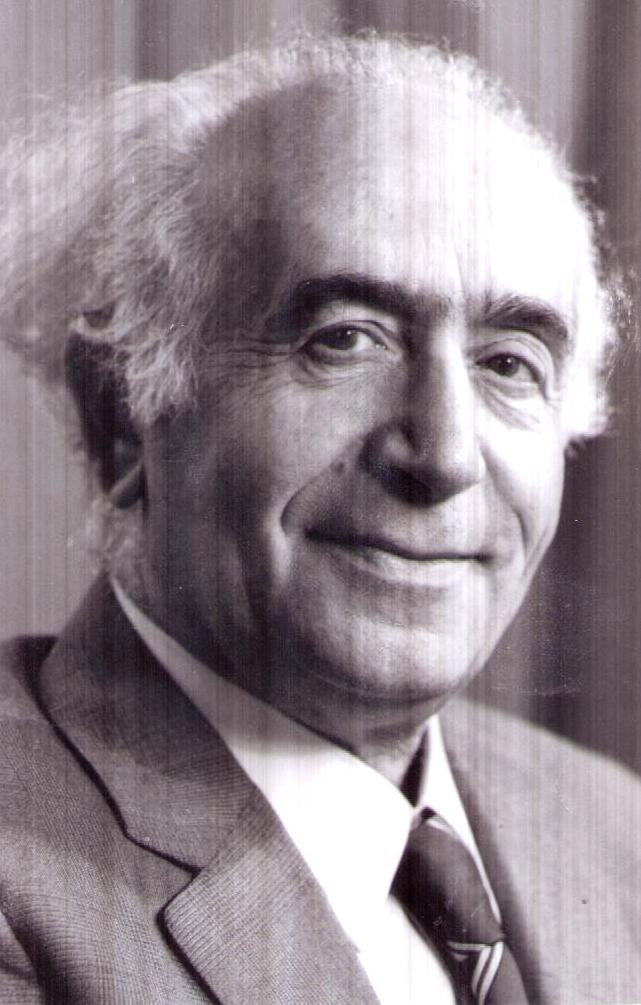
- Born: January 16, 1909; Rome, Italy
- Died: November 26, 1995 (aged 86); Jerusalem, Israel
- Spouse: Vera Colombo (m. 1934)
- Awards: Bublick Award (1972); Rothschild Prize (1977); Israel Prize (1982)

Academic background
- Education: University of Rome

Academic work
- Institutions: Hebrew University of Jerusalem; Central Bureau of Statistics

Roberto Bachi (Hebrew: רוברטו בקי; 16 January 1909 – 26 November 1995) was an Italian-Israeli statistician and demographer, and founder of the Israel Central Bureau of Statistics. His research focused on the graphical presentation of statistics and the renewal of Jewish demographic studies in the diaspora.

== Biography ==
Roberto Bachi was born to an Italian Jewish family in Rome, the son of Clelia Lampronti and economist Riccardo Bachi. He studied law and statistics at the University of Rome, receiving a Doctor of Laws degree in 1931. He taught statistics at the University of Sassari from 1934 to 1936, and at the University of Genoa from 1936, becoming full professor in 1937. He emigrated to Palestine following the introduction of the Italian racial laws in 1938, where he became an active Mapainik.

Bachi worked as a statistician in the Hadassah Medical Organization (where he founded a Medical Central Bureau of Statistics), and during 1945–47 in the Department of Statistics of the Mandatory Government. He began teaching statistics at the Hebrew University of Jerusalem in the early 1940s. He studied the issue of sub-replacement fertility the Yishuv and corresponded extensively with major Zionist leaders of the time, conveying comparative data on the Jewish and Arab populations to David Ben-Gurion and others.

After World War II, the Italian Foreign Ministry invited Bachi to resume his post in Genoa, which Bachi declined. By 1945, Bachi had become associate professor of statistics at the Hebrew University, and was promoted to full professor in 1947. He was also appointed Statistician General of Israel with the foundation of the state in 1948, and founded Israel's Central Bureau of Statistics in 1949, which he directed until 1971.

At the same time Bachi was among the founders of the Faculty of Social Sciences of the Hebrew University and served as its first dean from 1953 to 1956. He served as prorector of the Hebrew University in 1959–60. After his retirement in 1977, Bachi concentrated primarily on geostatistics and graphical representation of statistical data. He was awarded the Israel Prize in 1982.

Bachi died on November 26, 1995.

== Selected publications ==
- La mobilità della popolazione all'interno delle grandi città europee (Rome, 1933)
- Evoluzione demografica dell'ebraismo italiano (Rome, 1939)
- Graphical Rational Patterns (Jerusalem, 1968)
- Population Trends of World Jewry (Jerusalem, 1976)
- The Population of Israel (Jerusalem, 1977)
- New Methods of Geostatistical Analysis and Graphical Presentation (New York, 1999)

Preceded by —	Director of the Israel Central Bureau of Statistics; 1919–1934	Succeeded by Moshe Sicron
