= Sergio Della Pergola =

Israeli demographer and statistician

- סרג'ו דלה-פרגולה
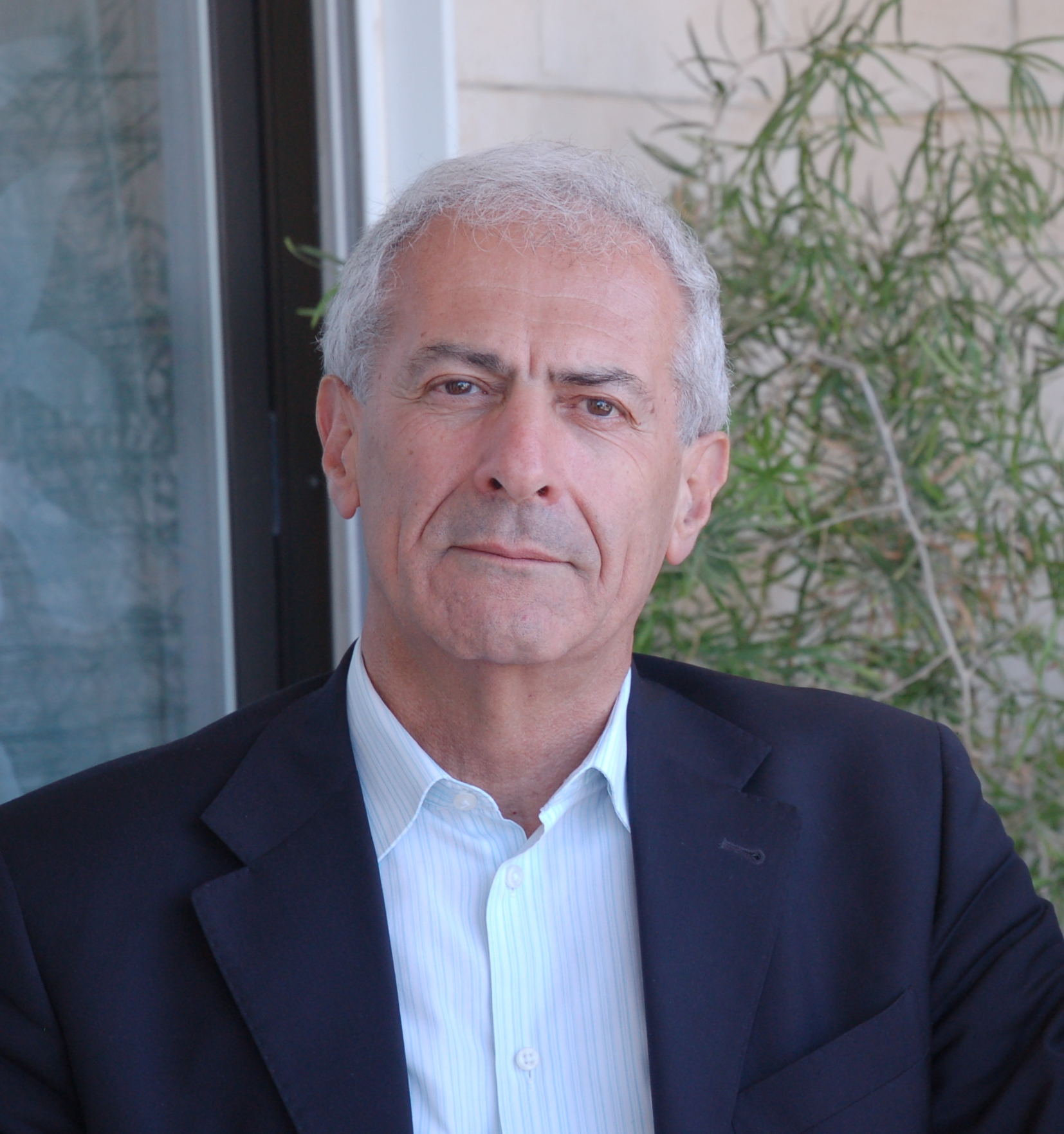
- Della Pergola in 2008
- Born: 7 September 1942 (age 84); Trieste, Kingdom of Italy
- Citizenship: Israeli
- Education: Hebrew University of Jerusalem (PhD)
- Occupations: Demographer; statistician; professor
- Spouse: Miriam Toaff (m. 1966)
- Children: 4
- Relatives: Elio Toaff (father-in-law)

Sergio Della Pergola (Hebrew: סרג'ו דלה-פרגולה; born 7 September 1942) is an Italian-born Israeli demographer, statistician, and professor. He is an expert in demography and statistics related to the global Jewish population.

== Biography ==
Della Pergola was born to a Jewish family in Trieste in September 1942. His grandfather was a rabbi. After World War II, the family settled in Milan, where Della Pergola was an active member of Jewish youth movements and student organizations. He immigrated to Israel in 1966, settling down in Jerusalem.

He holds an MA in political science from the University of Pavia and a PhD from the Hebrew University of Jerusalem. He is Professor Emeritus of population studies at the Hebrew University’s Avraham Harman Institute of Contemporary Jewry, where he was the Institute Chair and Director of the Division of Jewish Demography and Statistics and held the Shlomo Argov Chair in Israel–Diaspora Relations.

Della Pergola is married to Miriam Toaff (daughter of Elio Toaff), with whom he has four children.

== Career ==
Della Pergola is a specialist on the demography of world Jewry and has published numerous books and over two hundred papers on historical demography, the family, international migration, Jewish identification, and population projections in the Jewish diaspora and in Israel. He has written extensively about demography in Israel and Palestine. He has lectured at over 70 universities and research centres in Western Europe, North America, and Latin America, and served as a senior policy consultant to the President of Israel, the Government of Israel, the Jerusalem Municipality, and many major national and international organizations.

He served on the National Technical Advisory Committee for the 1990 and 2000-2001 National Jewish Population Surveys and on the experts committee of the 2013 survey of Jewish Americans by the Pew Research Center in the United States. He was Visiting Professor at the Oxford Centre for Hebrew and Jewish Studies in 2002-2003, at Brandeis University in 2006, at the University of Illinois at Chicago in 2009, and at the University of California, Los Angeles, in 2010. He is a member of the Yad Vashem Committee for the Righteous of the Nations.

== Awards ==
In 1999, Della Pergola won the Marshall Sklare Award for distinguished achievement from the Association for the Social Scientific Study of Jewry (ASSJ) and his award presentation was entitled: "Thoughts of a Jewish Demographer in the Year 2000". In 2013, he was awarded the Michael Landau Prize for Migration and Demography.
