= HSBC Private Bank (Monaco) =

HSBC Private Bank (Monaco) S.A.
- Company type: Subsidiary of HSBC Private Bank
- Industry: Finance
- Founded: 1999
- Defunct: 2016
- Headquarters: Monte Carlo, Monaco
- Key people: Gérard Cohen, CEO
- Products: Private banking

HSBC Private Bank (Monaco) S.A. was a subsidiary of HSBC Private Bank, headquartered in Monte Carlo, Monaco.

== History ==
HSBC's presence in Monaco began in 1999 when it acquired Republic National Bank of New York and Safra Republic Holdings, both owned by financier Edmond Safra. The transaction was valued at $10.3 billion US dollars, the biggest foreign takeover deal for an American banking company as of then. By purchasing Safra Republic Holdings, HSBC acquired 44 offices holding client funds that total $56.5 billion, and 30,000 international clients in high-margin private banking in Switzerland, Luxembourg and Monaco.

In 2006, HSBC Monaco was the biggest bank in Monaco in terms of assets, with 15 per cent market share of banking in Monaco and total assets under management valued at around $10 billion US dollars. It was also one of the most successful asset gathering subsidiaries of HSBC Private Bank.

In October 2016, HSBC announced its decision to wind down its private banking operations in Monaco. This move was part of a broader strategy to streamline its services following various tax-related controversies, namely the Swiss Leaks and Panama Papers, associated with its Swiss subsidiary. The bank arranged for its clients in Monaco to be referred to CFM Indosuez Wealth Management, a subsidiary of Crédit Agricole, which subsequently became the largest bank in Monaco. HSBC refocused its private banking operations to major centres in London, New York City, Geneva, Singapore and Hong Kong.

== See also ==
- List of banks in Monaco
