= Avidar =

Avidar is a surname. Notable people with the surname include:

- Eli Avidar (born 1964), Israeli businessman, diplomat, and politician
- Nina Avidar Wiener (born 1933), Israeli philanthropist
- Yemima Avidar-Tchernovitz (1909–1998), Israeli author

== See also ==
- Avidan
