= Gérard Cohen =

Swiss private banker and arts patron

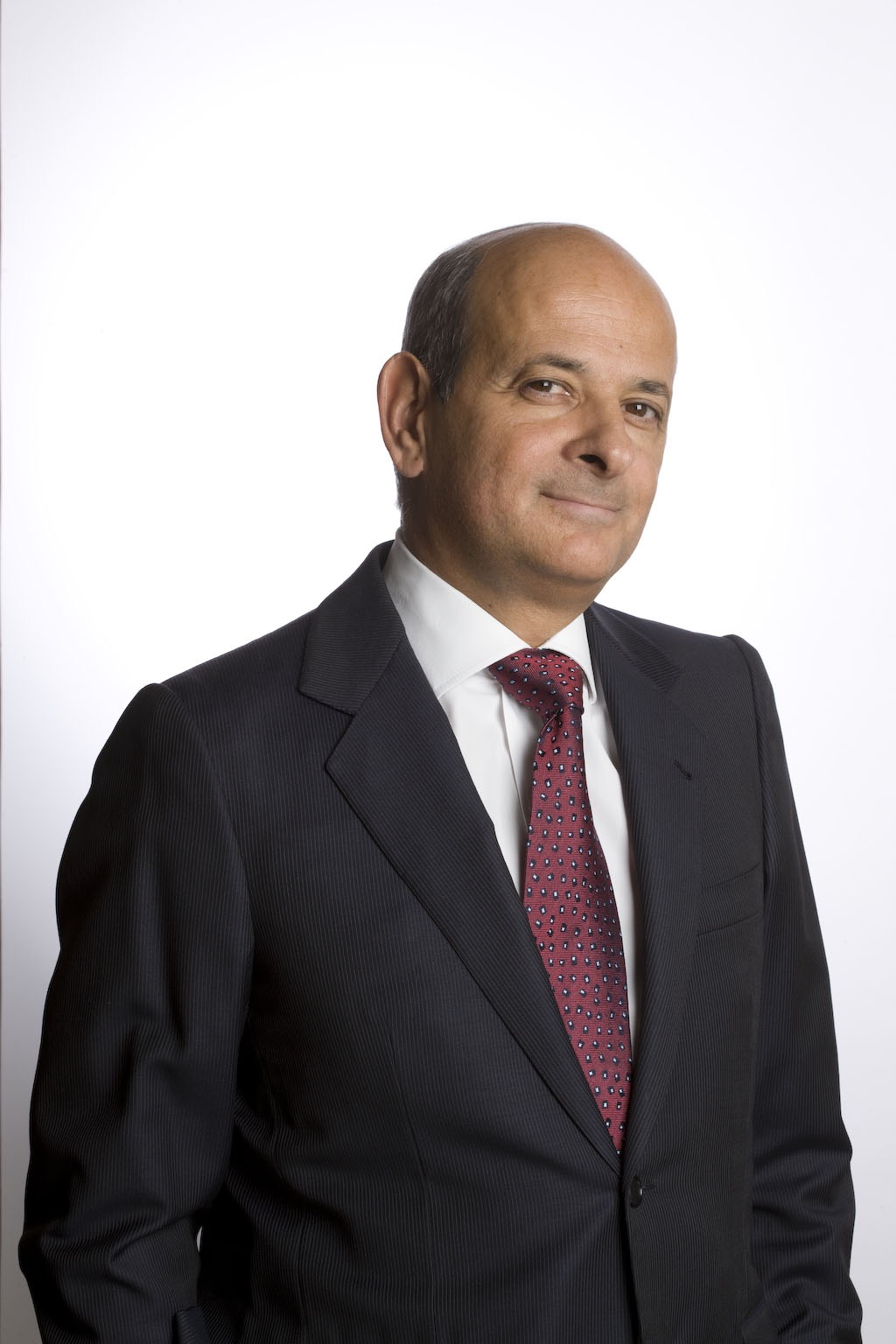
Gérard Cohen, private banker and patron of the arts

Gérard Cohen (born February 19, 1953) is a Swiss private banker and patron of the arts. Between 1991 and 2016 he was managing director of HSBC Private Bank in Monaco.

== Career ==
In 1978 Cohen started his career at Republic National Bank of New York under Edmond Safra. In 1985 he became head of private banking for Banque Safra-Luxembourg and in 1991 head of Republic National Bank of New York. When the bank was acquired by HSBC in 1999 and renamed to HSBC Private Bank Monaco he became its managing director. In 2016 he resigned.

== Arts ==
From 2002 to 2014 he was a member of the international director council of the Guggenheim Museum, New York City, and from 2003 to 2014 of the Tate Modern, London. He currently is the director of the Helmut Newton Foundation, Berlin, the Grimaldi Forum, Monaco, as well as director of Princess Grace Foundation, New York.

== International School of Monaco ==
In 1994 Cohen founded the International School of Monaco, and from 1994-2018 he served as chairman of the board of trustees.

== Awards ==
In 2008 he has received the Order of Saint-Charles from Albert II, Prince of Monaco and in 2012 the Order of Cultural Merit (Monaco).
