= Senator Maher =

Senator Maher may refer to:

- Ceci Maher (born 1953), Connecticut State Senate
- Ryan Maher (born 1977), South Dakota State Senate
- Ted Maher (1891–1982), Senate of Australia
