= Killam Trusts =

Canadian foundation

The Killam Trusts were established in 1965 after the death of Dorothy J. Killam, the widow of Izaak Walton Killam, a Canadian financier, for a time the wealthiest man in Canada. He died intestate in 1955, but before his death he and his wife discussed in extensive detail the scholarship plan on which the Killam Trusts were founded. Approximately one half of his estate went to the government as inheritance tax. It was used to found the Canada Council, along with similar funds from the estate of Sir James Dunn, also from Nova Scotia. The rest of Killam's estate was inherited by his widow. In the ten years between his death and hers, she doubled the Killam fortune.

Upon her death at Villa Leopolda, her lawyer put into motion the plans the Killams had discussed during their lifetimes. Having no children of their own, the Killams decided to leave their fortune to further post-secondary education in Canada at the graduate level.

The Killam benefactions went to five Canadian universities: University of British Columbia, University of Calgary, University of Alberta, the Montreal Neurological Institute and Hospital at McGill University and Dalhousie University. The Canada Council for the Arts also received Killam funds and administered the national program consisting of the Killam Research Fellowships open to professors from all Canadian universities; and the Killam Prize, valued at $100,000 and recognizing lifetime contributions in each of the following categories: health sciences, natural sciences, engineering, social sciences and humanities.

In August 2021, the Canada Council for the Arts announced the signing of a Memorandum of Understanding that would transition the administration of the Killam program to the National Research Council Canada (NRC). The 2023 National Killam Program cycle was officially launched under the administration of the NRC in April 2022 and now consists of the Dorothy Killam Fellowships and the Killam Prize.
