= Rivka Bertisch Meir =

American psychologist

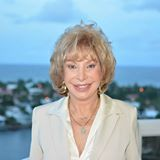
- Meir in 2013
- Born: Rivka Bertisch; December 12, 1941; Buenos Aires, Argentina
- Died: August 14, 2014 (aged 72); Aventura, Florida
- Citizenship: USA
- Education: University of Hawaiʻi; Saybrook University
- Known for: Contributions to international psychology
- Awards: Fellow, American Psychological Association
- Scientific career
- Fields: International psychology; Psychotherapy; Personal development
- Workplaces: University of Hawaiʻi; Leeward Community College; Hebrew University; University of Buenos Aires; Touro College; Complutense University; Fordham University; BMCC; Hunter College; Ben Gurion University; Tel Aviv University; Ariel University; TCI College of Technology
- Doctoral advisors: Raymond Corsini and Stanley Krippner

Rivka Bertisch Meir (December 12, 1941 – August 14, 2014) was an Argentine-American psychologist, licensed mental health counselor, and psychotherapist. She is known for the creation of personal development programs in the United States, Israel, and Argentina in the 1970s and 1980s and for establishing global partnerships in international psychology.

Meir was a chairperson and International Liaison of International Psychology (Division 52) of the American Psychological Association from 2005 to 2012. As International Liaison, she recruited international psychologists to establish partnerships with the American Psychological Association. Meir was the founder of the APA "Adopt a Psychologist" initiative, which established international alliances between psychologists. Meir was co-founder of the APA National Speakers Network.

== Background and education ==
Rivka Bertisch was born in Buenos Aires, Argentina to European Jewish parents. Most of her relatives were killed by the Nazis in Poland during World War II. She attended the University of Hawaiʻi, where she received dual bachelor's degrees in communications and psychology and a Masters in public health.

She pursued and completed all but one graduate-level course at the University of Hawaiʻi before receiving a PhD from the University for Humanistic Studies (presently Alliant International University). Her dissertation work used cell memory techniques to access and modify traumatic memories.

In the 1970s, Meir was a program planner and researcher at the School of Community Medicine of the Hadassah Medical Center at Hebrew University in Jerusalem, Israel, and then at the Jerusalem Municipality, Department of Public Health where Rivka (as Rivka Danziger) co-directed Project KIDUM. Meir also introduced and directed "EST" (Erhard Seminar Training—Landmark Education) in Israel from 1977 to 1979. In 1986, she moved back to Argentina, where she, sponsored by the R. Bertisch Foundation from 1990 to 1996, pioneered the Integrative Rivka's Method, which was aimed at improving relationship skills in patients. This approach to therapy emphasizes body-mind connection, holistic health promotion, and various spiritual and psychological techniques, including firewalking.

In 1996, she moved to the New York City area where she became an organizational consultant. In 2004, she founded the American Psychological Association "Adopt a Psychologist" initiative, a mentoring program to foster alliances between psychologists worldwide.

== Academic positions ==
- 2005–2012 – Visiting professor of Health Sciences, TCI College of Technology, New York
- 2011 – Visiting professor of psychology, Ariel University, Samaria, Israel
- 2011 – Visiting professor of Social Work, Tel Aviv University, Israel
- 2011 – Visiting professor of Public Health, Ben Gurion University, Beersheva, Israel
- 2011 – Visiting professor of Social Work, Hebrew University, Jerusalem, Israel
- 2008–2009 – Adjunct Professor of Social Work, Fordham University, New York
- 2007–2009 – Adjunct Professor of Psychology, Lehman College, CUNY, New York
- 2007 – Adjunct Professor of Psychology, Pace University, New York
- 2005–2007 – Adjunct Professor of Psychology, Hunter College, CUNY, New York
- 2005–2006 – Adjunct Professor of Social Science, BMCC – CUNY, New York
- 2006 – Adjunct Professor of Psychology, Fordham University, New York
- 2003 – Visiting professor of psychology, Complutense University, Madrid, Spain
- 1998–2001 – Adjunct Professor of Psychology and Health Sciences, Touro College, New York
- 1992 – Professor in the School of Medicine, University of Buenos Aires, Argentina
- 1977–1980 Visiting professor in the Schools of Social Work, Educational Psychology, and Occupational Therapy, Hebrew University, Jerusalem, Israel
- 1976–1977 Researcher and Program Planner, Hadassah Medical Center, Hebrew University, Jerusalem, Israel
- 1976 – Instructor of Psychology, Leeward Community College, Honolulu, Hawaii
- 1974–1976 Adjunct Instructor of Psychology, University of Hawaiʻi, Honolulu, Hawaii
