= The four Rs =

The four Rs may refer to:

- some variants of The three Rs
  - Reading, (W)Riting, (A)Rithmetic (or Reckoning), and Religion, in education
  - Responsibility, Respect, Resourcefulness, Responsiveness (in the Individual Education school system)
  - Reduce, reuse, recycle and repair, in sustainability
- rescue, rehabilitation, restoration, and reintegration.
- remove, raise, reduce and reward, A YouTube campaign that approach to responsibility for its content.
