= Nina Avidar Wiener =

Israeli philanthropist (born 1933)

Nina Wiener, 2013

Nina Avidar Wiener (Hebrew: נינה אבידר ווינר; born 1933, birth name: Nina Ester Avidar) is an Israeli philanthropist and educator, a co-founder of the International Sephardic Education Foundation (ISEF).

== Biography ==
Nina Avidar was born in Alexandria, Egypt to an interconfessional family of Ashkenazi (Poland-born) father and Sefardi mother. The family were strong adherents of Zionism, and her father was put into a concentration camp for Zionists for some time in 1948. Using their Polish pasports, the family managed to flee to Israel in 1949. Later Nina Avidar moved to Switzerland to study psychology in the University of Geneva. She continued her studies in psychology in the United States, in the Columbia University, from which she received master's degree in professional counceling. In the 1950's she worked as a psychologist from the Youth Aliyah organization in transit camps with new young immigrants, she noticed large educational gaps of the children from North Africa compared to the Israeli-born children of sabras. Eventually, in 1977, with the encouragement and participation of American philanthropists Edmond Safra of the Republic National Bank and his wife, Lily Safra, the established the ISEF foundation. Over the years, ISEF provided tens of thousands of university scholarhips for Israeli Sephardi youth.

The citation of the Israel Prize committee noted her "deep awareness of the struggles faced by many young people in the periphery who lack access to higher education and, as a result, miss opportunities to realize their potential" and "her lifelong efforts to reshape Israeli society through education and for the profound change she has brought to the lives of countless young people".

== Personal life ==
In the United States she met and married Walter Wiener, who for a long time served chairman and CEO of the Republic National Bank and as a member of the board of directors of the ISEF Foundation.. They married in 1966. It was Walter Wiener' second marrige.

== Awards ==
- 2025: Israel Prize for Lifetime Achievement
- 2019: Honorary doctorate from Technion
