= HSBC Guyerzeller Bank =

Swiss private bank

HSBC Guyerzeller Bank AG
- Industry: Private banking
- Founded: 1894
- Defunct: 2009
- Fate: Wholly owned by HSBC
- Successor: HSBC Private Bank
- Headquarters: Zürich, Switzerland
- Number of employees: 360
- Parent: Midland Bank
- Website: www.hsbc.guyerzeller.com

HSBC Guyerzeller Bank AG, a member of the HSBC Group, was a Swiss private bank advising individuals and families in all matters of wealth management, investment advice and trust services. Its head office was in Zürich, and it had two branches in Geneva, as well as representative offices in Hong Kong and Istanbul. It had 360 employees and about CHF 29 billion in assets under management. It is now subsumed under HSBC Private Bank.

== History ==
In 1894 Adolf Guyer-Zeller, an engineer and one of the pioneers of the Swiss railways, founded Bank Guyerzeller A.G. to finance the construction of the railway line to the top of the Jungfrau mountain.

In 1959 Zurmont Bank A G. (est. 1957), the Swiss subsidiary of the London Merchant Bank Samuel Montagu & Co., merged in Neue Guyerzeller Bank A G. (est. 1939 as a successor to Bank Guyerzeller) to form Guyerzeller Zurmont Bank AG. When HSBC acquired Midland Bank in 1992, Guyerzeller became a member of the HSBC Group. Midland Bank had become the majority shareholder of Guyerzeller Bank when it acquired Samuel Montagu & Co.

In 1997 Guyerzeller Bank integrated in Trinkaus & Burkhardt (Schweiz) AG, which had been a subsidiary of HSBC Trinkaus. The next year, HSBC Group increased its participation in Guyerzeller to 96% and then the year after that Guyerzeller became "HSBC Guyerzeller Bank AG".

In 2002 HSBC integrated CCF (Suisse) SA and CCF-Handelsfinanz Bank into HSBC Guyerzeller after HSBC acquired Crédit Commercial de France (CCF). Two years later, HSBC became sole owner of the bank.

In 2009, HSBC Guyerzeller merged with HSBC Private Bank (Suisse) into one legal entity, under the newly appointed CEO of HSBC Private Bank Suisse (S.A.), Alexandre Zeller, who had joined the bank from the Banque cantonale vaudoise. HSBC Private Bank, formerly known as HSBC Republic, was established in 1988 as Republic National Bank of New York (Suisse), but traces its ancestry back to 1966. It became part of the HSBC group when HSBC acquired Republic Bank of New York in 1999. HSBC Private Bank (Suisse) had its headquarters in Geneva, Switzerland. HSBC Private Bank (Suisse) operates as a subsidiary of HSBC Private Banking Holdings (Suisse) SA.

== See also ==
- HSBC Private Bank
- HSBC Bank plc
