= Ted Maher =

American convicted killer/attempted killer (born 1958)

- Born: Theodore Maher; June 9, 1958 (age 68); Auburn, Maine, U.S.
- Occupation: Ex-Green Beret (claimed) turned registered nurse
- Known for: Arson death of Edmond Safra
- Spouse: Heidi Wustrau
- Children: 3

Theodore Maher (born June 9, 1958) is a former registered nurse who was convicted of arson in a 1999 fire that killed Edmond Safra and another nurse, Vivian Torrente, at Safra's Monaco penthouse apartment. In October 2007, Maher was released after serving eight years in jail. In June 2025, Maher, who had meanwhile changed his name to Jon Green, was sentenced to nine years in Jail in New Mexico for solicitation to commit murder.

== Biography ==
Maher was born in Maine and lived there and in California before his family settled in Upstate New York when he was 12 years old. After serving a stint in the U.S. Army in the mid-1970s, he received nursing degrees from Dutchess County Community College and Pace University. A brief marriage produced a son. While studying at the Dutchess County Community College Maher met his third wife, Heidi Wustrau. The couple lost contact for two years but started dating in 1991 while both attended Pace and worked at Columbia Medical Center of New York Presbyterian Hospital. They wed on December 12, 1993; this marriage produced two children. The family lived in Stormville, New York.

While working as a registered nurse at the neonatal unit at the Columbia Medical Center in 1999, Maher developed film from a camera he found left behind in a discharged patient's room. The camera's owners, Laura and Harry Slatkin, were grateful to retrieve the first photographs of their newborn twins. Harry Slatkin offered Ted the "job of a lifetime." Shortly thereafter Maher interviewed with the personal assistant to Edmond Safra, a banker and billionaire based in Monaco who required private nursing care for Parkinson's and other ailments."

According to Heidi Maher, the Safras liked that Ted was a former Green Beret and thought he could be both a bodyguard and a nurse. The Safras offered Ted Maher a contract at $600 per day, more money than he had ever made, but he'd have to leave for Monaco right away. With a hospital strike looming and legal bills mounting from a visitation battle with his ex-wife regarding his oldest son, Maher ultimately accepted the job in early August.

== Death of Edmond Safra ==
Safra, the 67-year-old founder and principal stock owner of the Republic National Bank of New York, had Parkinson's disease and required constant care. On December 3, 1999, Maher was scheduled at the last minute to work the overnight shift caring for Safra with Vivian Torrente (one of seven other nurses who looked after Safra) at Safra's Monaco penthouse at La Belle Epoque, a four-story bank and two-story flat at 17 Avenue D'Ostende.

Immediately after his arrest Maher claimed two intruders had gained access to the apartment and that he had fought them off, receiving stab wounds. He had informed the other nurse, Vivian Torrente, of the assailants and had given her his cell phone to call for help. He ordered her to take Edmond Safra into the secure dressing room while he went to the nearby nursing station, where he lit toilet paper in a trash basket to set off a smoke alarm, with the intention of alerting outside people that there was a problem. Maher made his way, bleeding and feeling faint, downstairs to the lobby of the building to get help. But while police and firemen got to the building, they were unable to reach Safra and Torrente until it was too late.

Several days later, on December 7, Monaco's chief prosecutor, Daniel Serdet, announced that Maher had confessed to starting the fire "to draw attention to himself" as he was "jealous" of Safra's seven other nurses. In addition, his stab wounds had been self-inflicted. Maher had slashed himself twice with his own switchblade – once in the thigh and once in the stomach – to corroborate his story about the intruders. On December 6 Safra was buried in Geneva.

== Trial and conviction ==
The case was a sensation for Monaco. The French Riviera’s leading newspaper, Nice-Matin, dubbed it Monaco's "Trial of the Century". During his trial, Maher confessed to setting the blaze but said he never expected the fire, part of a bizarre plan to ingratiate himself with Safra, to rage out of control. Maher testified he started the blaze in a small wastebasket, expecting it to set off a fire alarm that would bring help and allow him to reap the credit for saving his employer.

There had been friction between Maher and Sonia Herkrath, Safra's head nurse, who considered Maher another "flavor of the month", who had gotten into Safra's good graces by returning a camera a friend forgot in New York six months earlier. Maher reportedly believed Herkrath was intentionally providing him with wrong information, causing him to make mistakes that had not gone unnoticed, and she frequently altered his schedule between day and night shifts with little or no notice.

Fearing the loss of his well-paid job, just six weeks after arriving in Monaco, Maher hatched the idea of setting the fire to ingratiate himself with his boss and earn a promotion. The prosecution described how Maher cut himself with a knife and then set a fire in a wastepaper basket. He called for rescue and told authorities that two masked intruders were in the apartment. But rather than extinguish the fire, Maher let it spread, the prosecution charged, leading to the two deaths. Prosecutors also said that his tale about intruders delayed the work of firefighters.

American lawyer Michael Griffith volunteered to assist with Ted Maher's defense. Griffith based the defense on the notion that while Maher did set the fire, he never intended to harm anyone. "It was a stupid, most insane thing a human being could do," says Griffith. "He did not intend to kill Mr. Safra. He just wanted Mr. Safra to appreciate him more. He loved Mr. Safra. This was the best job of his life." Maher maintained that the deaths of Safra and Torrente would have been averted if police had not blocked firefighters from launching a rescue attempt until long after Maher was rushed to a hospital. Lawyers for Safra's widow, Lily, argued that Maher should be judged for his actions, not his intentions.

In December 2002 Maher was convicted in the arson deaths of Edmond Safra and Vivian Torrente and sentenced to 10 years in prison. The prosecution had requested 12 years in prison for Maher. The charges carried a maximum penalty of life in prison. "He directly caused the deaths of Mrs. Torrente and Mr. Safra", said head prosecutor Daniel Serdet. "He trapped the victims." On the final day of his trial Maher called Safra "the best employer I ever had," and said he did not mean to cause his death or the death of the other nurse. "What's happened is and always will be a terrible accident", reiterating earlier testimony, in the hours before the verdict. Maher's wife was in court, as was Lily Safra.

=== Controversy ===
Maher was imprisoned in Monaco for over two years before his trial began, resulting in a considerable amount of controversy and speculation surrounding the case. Days before his death, Safra finalized the sale of his Republic National Bank to HSBC Holdings plc in a multi-billion dollar deal. His business made him some potent enemies as well. In 1998, his Republic Bank made a report to the F.B.I. that began an investigation into the possibility of a vast Russian money laundering operation that came to focus on the Bank of New York and ultimately helped break a $6bn crime ring.

The increasingly security conscious Safra employed a small army of guards, purportedly trained by Mossad intelligence units in Israel. Because the Safra family felt the home was safe, none of his security team was on duty on the night of the fire, which both enabled Maher to carry out the arson attack and hampered police and firefighters' efforts to gain access to his secure penthouse. Upon his arrest, Maher initially fabricated the story that two intruders had penetrated the apartment and that he had fought them off, receiving stab wounds. This cover story, combined with Safra's involvements with the F.B.I., led to rumours that the incident had been a well-executed Russian mob hit, leaving Maher as the patsy.

Once the trial was underway, however, Maher claimed that he had acted alone, motivated by self-interest and paranoia and specifically out of fear of losing his highly rewarding job. Maher later repudiated his confession and alleged he was forced to admit to the crime during his initial hospitalization.

== Jail break ==
Less than two months after being sentenced, on 21 January 2003 Ted Maher and his cellmate, an Italian awaiting trial in Monaco on charges stemming from a robbery, sawed through the bars on their cell, and then, using a rope made of black garbage bags, climbed out and escaped overnight. Maher made it 15 miles to Nice, where he holed up in a hotel and made telephone contact with people in the US, including his wife, his lawyer and a priest. The police apprehended him seven hours later.

== Release and interview on Court TV ==
In a series of interviews on the American network Court TV, Maher maintained his pretrial statements were coerced, threats were made against his family by authorities, and to this day maintains his innocence. American writer and journalist Dominick Dunne did comprehensive investigations on the case for courtroom television and was reportedly not entirely convinced Maher was responsible for Safra's death, questioning the 2 1/2 hour delay between when the fire was reported and emergency personnel finally entered the building.

== Dognapping charge ==
Maher, then also known as Jon Green, was arrested in San Antonio, Texas, on 13 June 2022, on 3rd degree felony charges for burglary, larceny, forgery, and fraud after he allegedly kidnapped three search and rescue dogs in Carlsbad, New Mexico, that were owned by his ex-wife.

== Murder for hire against his wife ==
In 2023, Maher was incarcerated after police say he conspired with and paid another inmate, Greg Markham, to kill his wife Kim Lark via a fentanyl overdose. The plan was to bond Markham out of jail so he could kill his wife and steal money they thought she had hidden in her house. It involved coordination from his cell and money transfer via Western Union by Maher's biographer Jennifer Thomas to pay the bond.

Maher was found guilty of murder for hire in March and then sentenced to 9 years, the maximum allowed for the charge, in July 2025.
