= Individual education =

Individual education is a school system rooted in the individual psychology of Alfred Adler. Designed by Raymond Corsini, the individual education program includes a number of basic principles. The program consists of three components academic, creative/applied and socialization. Corsini also outlined disciplinary procedures and a number of other principles to ensure the most productive possible school environment.

== Differences ==
The following are some differences between traditional education ("autocratic") and individual education ("democratic") model of education:

Traditional system	Individual education system
Autocratic	Democratic
Homework given	No homework given
Grades are everything	Learning is everything
Teacher burnout common	Teachers are fulfilled
Teachers forced to be authoritarian	Teachers are facilitators
Children rebel	Children collaborate
Children hate school	Children cannot wait to get back from summer
Children are considered inferior	Children are considered equals
Rewards and punishment	Respect
Pass or fail	Children learn at their own pace
Pass, or fail in life	Children learn because they want to
Forced academics	Children decide how best to learn
Social component a major source of fear	Teachers facilitate social development of children
Pressure, stress all round	Innate motivation to learn, and to teach, shines through

== Basic principles ==
The following are the basic principles of the individual education school system:

- Children can veto their attendance in a class.
- Children are not in a competition or race; they only compete against themselves.
- Children decide if and when to study and there is no homework unless the child asks for it.
- Children can learn in whatever fashion works for them.
- Feedback regarding their learning is given to children as soon as possible.
- Every child has a teacher-adviser, an in-school parent figure who the child chooses.
- There are only three rules; they are impartially and strictly enforced.
- Children have the opportunity to develop special talents if they wish.
- Children are offered a wide range of creative/applied courses.
- Learning is considered a privilege, not an obligation.
- Teachers have the right to ask a child to leave a classroom or to stay out of their classroom.
- The school day is divided roughly equally between academic, creative/applied and socialization.
- All evaluations are objective—not subjective.
- Idiosyncratic classroom rules may be established by the teacher for their class, so long as they don't violate Individual Education principles.
- The "GO" and "STOP" signals are the only means of enforcing rules in the classroom.
- Peer teaching is encouraged.
- Academic progress reports are kept on children, but grades are not given out.
- An individualized pace of learning is encouraged.
- Teachers are responsible for teaching; children are responsible for learning.
- The emphasis is on the development of a successful person.
- Community resources are accessed where possible.
- Children may be advised to study at the growing edge of their abilities, but the level at which they study is no one's choice but theirs.
- Faculty has three jobs: academic teaching, creative/applied teaching, and socialization training/advising.
- Regular full classroom meetings are mandatory.
- Rewards, honors and other extraneous motivators should be avoided.
- Criticisms, warnings, or various other forms of punishment are strictly forbidden.
- The school operates on the basis of natural and logical consequences, using encouragement and intrinsic joy from skill mastery as the primary motivators for learning.
- Children have the right to go to any other classroom or supervised library or study hall.
- On any given day, children can choose not to learn.
- Teachers have full freedom in teaching the curriculum, but cannot force children to follow it.

=== The Four Rs ===
==== Responsibility ====
A primary goal of individual education is to make children self-sufficient, giving them the mean to become a productive member of society; to become mature and self-reliant. Individual education is against the infantilization of the child. Instead, individual education maximizes the child's self-determination.

==== Respect ====
Individual education is designed to develop in children feeling of respect of the self and of others. Traditional school systems make children feel inferior and make many of them feel unsuccessful. A system based on rewards and punishment, praise and disapproval, is considered morally bankrupt in the individual education system. Some children are not born into environments conducive to academics. Some children have strengths not visible in the traditional system.

==== Resourcefulness ====
Every child has innate talents, and some strengths and weaknesses. Whatever resources the child has, individual education permits expression, whether academic or non-academic, long as they can read and do basic math. For others, a broader program will be necessary. The children will determine the program that best suits them. The curriculum will be there when they need it. The teacher will encourage learning of all types of academe, but will not force it.

==== Responsiveness ====
The concept of social interest (Gemeinschaftsgefuhl in Adlerian theory) is central to individual education. It means responding to the needs of others. It can be seen in school spirit, patriotism, love for family, or elsewhere. This is critical to a child becoming a productive and happy member of society. This goal is not achieved directly, but rather through the achievement of the first three Rs.

== Academic program ==
The curriculum in the academic component is similar to that in the traditional system. Language, mathematics, history/geography and science are developed along the mastery model—through a skills list through which children progress from the beginning of school to the end. Children are tested weekly on average but it is the children who request to be tested; teachers cannot demand that tests be written. Instead a progress chart shows how far along the child is (80% is considered mastery). The child does not have to learn what he/she has already learned—if the child can pass a test without attending class, the progress chart is marked identically to that of a child that attended hours of classroom study. A quick learner is offered the next level of curriculum and the opportunity to tutor others. No numerical or letter-based grading system is used.

== Creative/applied courses ==
These courses can be offered in 6–8 week blocks. 1–3 can be chosen out of 9–12 courses offered. Included are topics students want to learn but do not find in traditional curriculum. They usually involve some physical activities (e.g. soccer), some artistic ones (visual arts) and some applied (horticulture). Teachers offer courses in areas of their interest. Community resources are used where possible.

== Socialization ==
Teachers socialize children through their positions as teachers and advisers. Children can choose their adviser, though the teacher can choose whether to accept that student. The adviser is an equal to the child in this environment (unlike during the academic program), and can only enforce the first school rule, related to dangerous behavior (see below). They meet as a group (the adviser with all children who have chosen him or her, or in the absence of a decision by the child, the child is assigned an adviser). Among other things, students learn about problem solving, health maintenance, interpersonal communications and purpose in life. The adviser supervises homeroom, which occurs at the beginning and end of the day and is unstructured. At least once a week and sometimes every day, the adviser holds a class meeting during which time the children discuss their various concerns. Rules regarding homeroom and class meetings can only be decided democratically. The teacher can suggest rules but the children decide by a vote.

The adviser is also the liaison between the child and other teachers with whom there may be difficulties, and can act as a mediator. The adviser also liaises with the child's parents but only on rare occasions and only with the child's consent. The child should always be in the room during such discussions if possible.

The socialization program includes "playtime" for younger children. Other teachers are also free to discuss social matters with children, as equals.

== Disciplinary procedures ==
Individual education schools have only three school rules:

1. Never do anything that could be dangerous, damaging or harmful to oneself or others, or property.
2. Be in a supervised place or en route to a supervised place.
3. If a teacher gives the GO signal, leave the room immediately and silently and without distracting the others.

There are no exceptions to these rules. Violation of one of these rules means the child is given a violation slip which they take to the office to have recorded.

Teachers can establish idiosyncratic classrooms, but they cannot violate the three rules above. Because there are so few rules, teachers must ensure that they are strictly enforced.

These rules are largely based on the discipline concepts of Rudolf Dreikurs. Dreikurs' concept of logical consequences is particularly useful in understanding the individual education disciplinary procedure.

=== GO and STOP ===
The GO signal is a gesture towards the door. A teacher may quietly say the child's name and make the gesture. The child must then leave the classroom immediately and silently without disruption to others. The child then has a few options: go to another class; go to the study hall; go to the library; seek to re-enter the classroom. The child can return to the classroom but may be given the STOP signal at that time, which means the child must go to another option. The STOP signal is a hand held face up in the direction of the child entering.

Teachers should not keep track of the number of times they give out the GO and STOP signals. They have no meaning in terms of the child's progress in school, and should carry no social consequences. A teacher must not warn the child of an impending GO signal, nor intimidate the child by standing close to them or giving them negative looks. There is no use in intimidating the child, who will rebel against such an attempt.

=== Consequences of violations ===
For each violation there is a consequence. If the ultimate consequence of expulsion is applied, it should include a referral to other professional help.

=== Findings ===
Research articles have indicated the following findings:

1. Students' scores on standardized achievement tests typically exceed national averages. Yearly academic gains are similar. Several schools that were initially low in district academic rank made impressive gains in rank. This is in spite of only half the amount of academic instructional time being spent in individual education schools compared to the traditional system.
2. There are far less disciplinary problems in individual education schools.
3. In many cases, 100% of teachers surveyed in a school have said that they prefer teaching in an individual education school rather than in a traditional one. The main comment is that teachers can put their energies into teaching.
4. Parents endorse the system.

== History ==
Raymond Corsini recognized in the late 1960s that adults were mistakenly blaming children for their poor behavior and grades in school when the problems were promoted by the school system in which the children operated. Corsini argued that the traditional system of education was fundamentally undemocratic. Children were "sentenced" to attend an institution where they had no choice of teacher or level of study, and minimal choice in terms of subjects, places or means of study. He set out to design a school system in which respect would be a central principle. Research by Paul Clark confirmed that individual education is an effective method of encouraging learning.

In the 1980s and 1990s, there were a dozen individual education schools operating in North America and Europe, including Hawaii, Illinois, Colorado, British Columbia and the Netherlands. One school, the Blooming Grove Academy, operated in Bloomington, Illinois, from 1986 until 2011. Forest Park I.E. (K–5) and Hufford I.E. (6–8), both in Joliet, IL continue to operate using the Corsini system. The original individual education school, Ho'Ala School in Wahiawa, Hawaii, continues to be in operation for kindergarten to grade 12. DaVinci Charter School closed down in February 2013.
