= Caroline Lacroix =

Mistress of Leopold II of Belgium (1883–1948)

- Baroness Vaughan
- Full name: Blanche Zélia Joséphine Delacroix
- Born: 13 May 1883; Bucharest, Kingdom of Romania
- Died: 12 February 1948 (aged 64); Cambo-les-Bains, Pyrénées-Atlantiques, France
- Buried: Père Lachaise Cemetery, Paris
- Spouses: Leopold II of Belgium (disputed) (m. 1909; died 1909) Antoine Durrieux (m. 1910; div. 1913)
- Issue: Lucien Philippe Delacroix Durrieux; Philippe Henri Delacroix Durrieux
- Father: Jules Delacroix
- Mother: Catherine Josephine Sebille

Blanche Zélia Joséphine Delacroix, better known as Caroline Lacroix (French pronunciation: [kaʁɔlin lakʁwa]; 13 May 1883 – 12 February 1948), was the most prominent and notorious of the mistresses of King Leopold II of Belgium.

Delacroix, who was of French origin, met the king in Paris as a young girl, when she was only 16 and he was 65. At that time, she earned her living from prostitution. They soon embarked upon a relationship that was to last until his death in 1909. Leopold lavished upon her large sums of money, estates, gifts, and a noble title, baronne de Vaughan (Baroness Vaughan). Because of these presents, Caroline was deeply unpopular both among the Belgian people and internationally, as Leopold became increasingly criticized for his rapacious exploitation of the Congo Free State, his own personal colony. As Caroline largely profited from the king's income from the colony, she became known as La reine du Congo ("The Queen of the Congo").

She and Leopold married in a religious ceremony five days before his death, though their failure to perform a civil ceremony rendered the marriage void under Belgian law. After the king's death, it was soon discovered that he had left Caroline numerous properties, items of high material value, Congolese bonds, and other valuable sources of income – all of which turned her into a multimillionaire. For years, the Belgian government and Leopold's three estranged daughters attempted to recover some of this wealth, with varying degrees of success. Caroline died on 12 February 1948 in Cambo-les-Bains, France.

== Early life ==
There remains a small degree of mystery concerning Caroline's early life. One account states that her father, Jules Delacroix, was a janitor of the French Legation at Bucharest. Another states that her father lived in Bucharest to seek his fortune, and she was born there as the thirteenth child of her parents. In her youth, Caroline worked as a barmaid.

Various sources assert that Caroline was a prostitute living in Paris. As a young woman, she was the mistress of Antoine-Emmanuel Durrieux, a former officer in the French army. According to Adam Hochschild, Durrieux liked to support the two of them by betting on horse races; when his luck soured, he became a form of pimp, prostituting Caroline to well-born clients. They undertook their schemes at the Élysée Palace, but frequently left debts unpaid. One day in 1900, while residing in Paris, Leopold II of Belgium heard of her "attractions" and felt interested in her modest beginnings. A woman sent by Leopold informed Caroline, "Madame, I am sent to you by a gentleman who has noticed you. He is a very high personage, but his exalted position obliges me to withhold his name".

A meeting was arranged for the following day; Caroline went to a secluded room, where Leopold arrived with two aides. As Leopold II was unknown to her, Caroline was so flustered with the encounter that she mixed up Belgium and Sweden in the king's presence, referring to him as His Majesty Oscar, to his surprise and amusement. The two aides' purpose soon became clear: one sat on each side of her and began asking questions that required her to "turn my head first to the right, then to the left ... their only aim, as I learned later, being to show off my two profiles to the mute personage", according to her memoirs. Leopold confessed himself pleased and invited Caroline to Austria with him; a large sum of money duly arrived the next day, along with some empty trunks, as Leopold was aware that she loved to buy clothes.

== Relationship with Leopold II ==
=== Reaction in the press ===
The Belgian king no longer stoops to prostitution, like his associates, in wild bursts of sensuality and lasciviousness: prostitution climbs to meet the King.

— Le Peuple, a Belgian newspaper

As a mere sixteen-year-old (compared with Leopold's age of 65), Caroline's relationship with the old king quickly became public knowledge, causing Leopold to be labeled lecherous and besotted. Though Leopold had previously embarked upon affairs with other mistresses (earning him the nickname le roi des Belges et des Belles), his affair with Caroline was unique, and the Belgian press in particular enjoyed publicising their affair for years. Her habit of accompanying Leopold to fashionable spas in Europe provoked further disbelief and outrage, with some speculating that she perversely pleasured the old king with the use of strategically placed mirrors and "special" equipment. The young mistress became known as la reine du Congo because the great wealth she accumulated from Leopold came from the Congo Free State. She became his companion for the last years of his life, as his estranged wife Queen Marie Henriette died in 1902. Their relationship coincided with Leopold's worsening international reputation, which was the result of his actions and orders concerning the Congo Free State. Hochschild writes that their affair ironically lost Leopold more popularity in Belgium than any of his crimes in the Congo; consequently, few of his former allies were willing to defend him once he became the target of the international protest movement led by the Congo Reform Association. Belgian socialists in particular used the affair to prove that because Leopold was in his "dotage" and under the control of a "rapacious and ambitious woman", he was unfit to govern.

=== A wealthy mistress ===
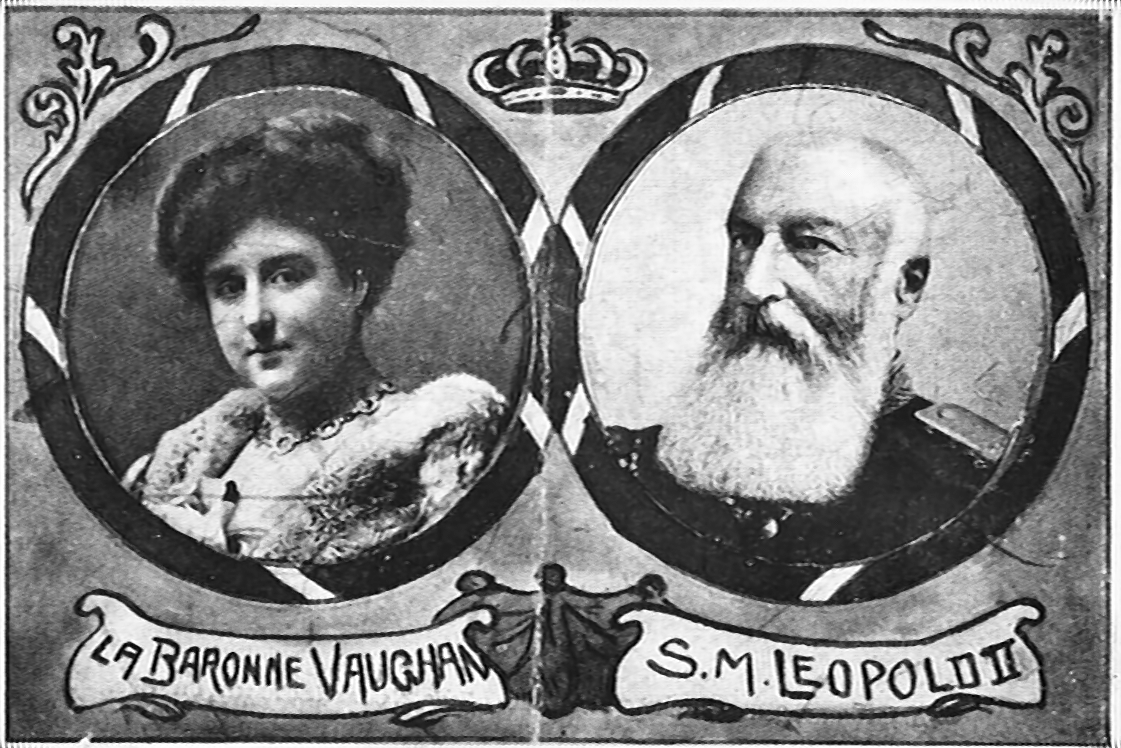
A postcard of Caroline and Leopold

After Marie Henriette's death, Leopold's relationship with Caroline became flagrantly open, and he placed her across from his Laeken mansion, in the Villa Vanderborght, even building a pedestrian bridge (above the ground, and over the fences of the mansion) so he could see her at will. The bridge reveals the king's jealousy, although this may have been justified, as her former lover Durrieux had been caught with her on several occasions. Caroline tried to pass him off as her brother when Leopold caught the two together; one publication reported that she and Durrieux had placed secret electric bells in all her residences so that servants could warn her when the king was approaching.

Château d'Arraucourt (i.e. Balincourt), Val-Oisé, gifted to the Baroness of Vaughan (Caroline Delacroix).

Leopold spent vast sums of money on gifts and estates for his young mistress and spending time with her on the estate of Villa Leopolda, which he acquired in 1902. She frequently traveled to Paris to visit her dress- and hat-maker, once bragging that she spent three million francs on dresses at a single store on one occasion. Caroline once complained to Leopold that the evening express train back to Brussels gave her little time to shop, causing Leopold to arrange it so that the train would leave an hour later. When pregnant with their first child, the king and the French government even split the cost of constructing a new road close to her villa so that her ride would not be uncomfortable. Taking Caroline with him everywhere, the king spent much of his time outside Belgium on his various properties throughout Western Europe, and was much resented by the Belgian people as a result. Much of this time was spent with Caroline and their two sons at the Villa Les Cédres, at Cap Ferrat in southern France, he acquired for her in 1904. Caroline also stayed at Chateau de Larmoy, which Leopold had rented for her; he acquired the French Château de Balaincourt for her in 1908, as well as a villa in Brussels, where Caroline had no scruples in appearing in public. Though typically traveling incognito, she accompanied Leopold to the funeral of Queen Victoria in 1901, causing a great scandal. Her unpopularity in Belgium increased dramatically once it began to be realized that all of Leopold's riches from the Congo were not benefiting his country, but rather himself and his young mistress.

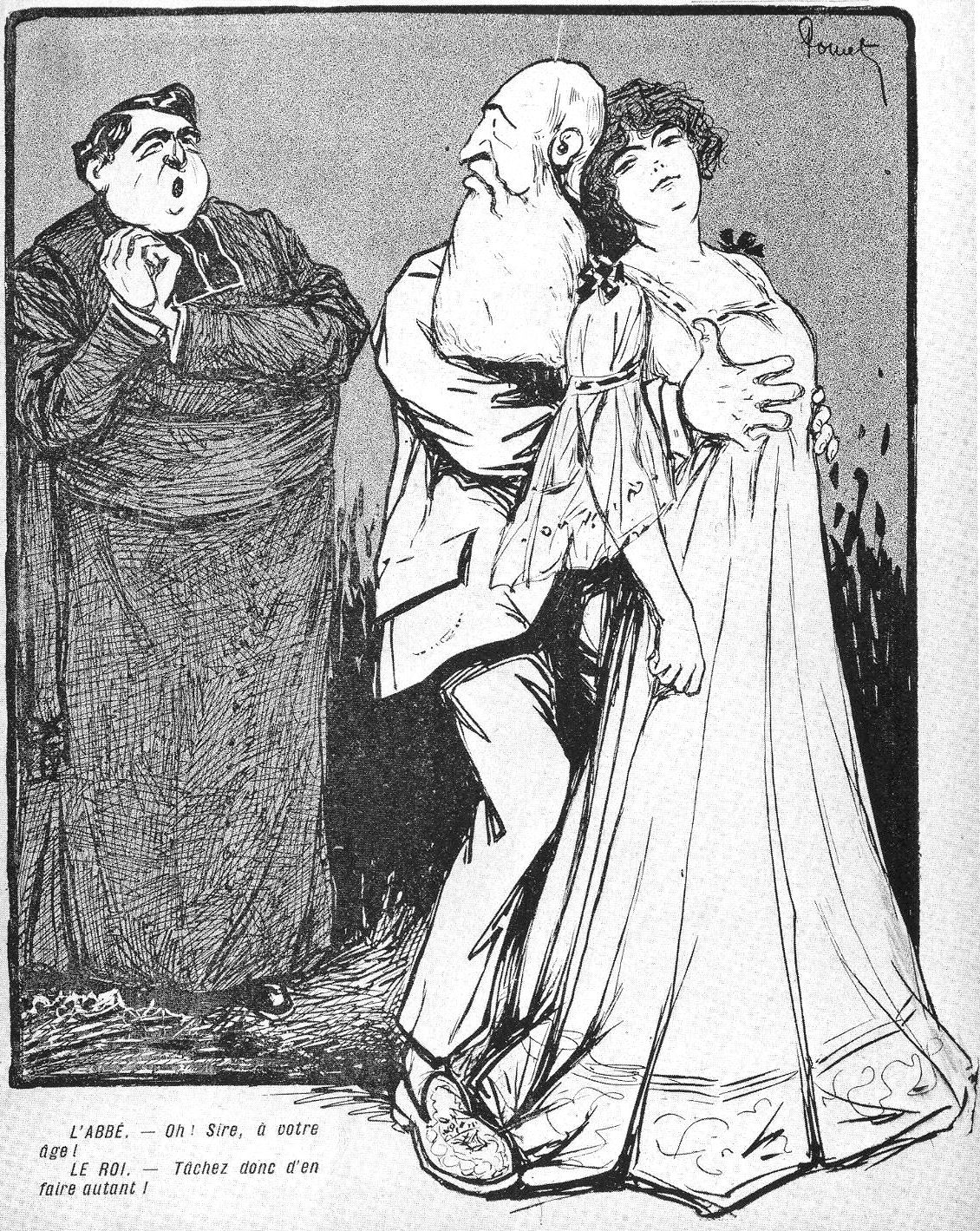
A contemporary cartoon lampooning Leopold's relationship with Caroline. A priest is exclaiming, "Oh Sire! At your age!" and the king answers "Try it for yourself!"

As the years went by and the king became increasingly prone to outbursts of anger, breaking with all his old relationships, it was said that only in Caroline and their sons' company did Leopold "recapture some of his vitality and Germanic humour". Caroline was described as having been above average in height, "plump but graceful, with a beautiful complexion and skin", with masses of chestnut hair; in character, she was "haughty, sharp, irritable" and ill-educated, and insisted on being treated with respect or else one would have to face the king's displeasure. She was also said to be in possession of "vivid conversational powers" and "dazzling youthfulness". Caroline was well-used to Leopold's "quirks", such as his extreme hypochondria. For instance, when she needed free time for herself, she coughed and pretended to have a cold. She used this "weapon" to keep scheming female rivals from gaining favor with the king as well, telling Leopold that they had colds. Rather than ignore their age difference, Caroline and Leopold seemed to enjoy it, she calling him Très Vieux and he calling her Très Belle.

=== Marriage ===
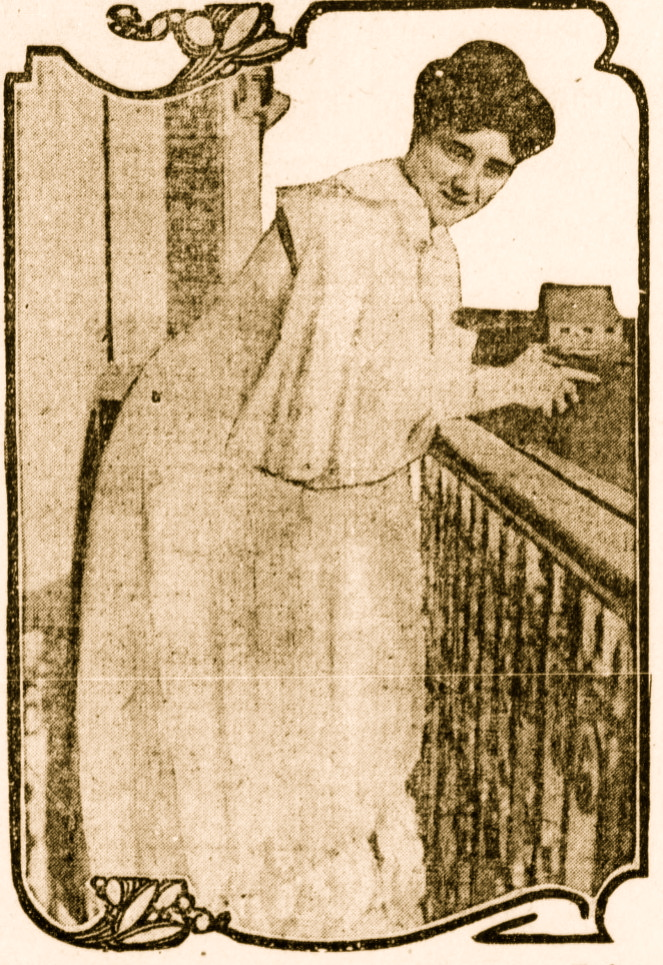
Caroline Lacroix about 1909

The king became ill from an "intestinal blockage" at his home at Laeken, and his mistress and two sons rushed to his side. Five days before his death, on 12 December 1909, King Leopold married Caroline in a religious ceremony performed by his personal chaplain. The marriage had no legal authority under Belgian law, as it was performed religiously, not civilly. It was recognized by the Vatican, as their wedding was solemnized in accordance with the Catholic Church's religious rites. The marriage caused a great scandal in Belgium, as its citizens were shocked that the Church had not only sanctioned it, but also allowed Caroline to remain at his bedside, even when the priest was present. Despite their marriage, Caroline had to hide out of sight whenever a visitor arrived to see the king, though she stayed by his side otherwise.

Leopold died in the presence of Caroline and two nurses; his youngest legitimate child Princess Clémentine, who had been barred from entering his palace before, was still not allowed to go into his room despite his weakening condition. Princesses Louise and Stéphanie also traveled to Brussels for a hoped-for reconciliation with their father and changes to the king's will, but Leopold turned them away. Caroline claimed that right before his passing, Leopold turned to his aide Baron Auguste Goffinet and said "I present you my widow. I place her under your protection during the few days she'll spend in Belgium after my death". Hochschild speculates that it is likely the king said this or something similar, as he was well-aware how much his daughters and the public loathed her, particularly when they discovered just how much he had left her and their sons.

=== Issue ===
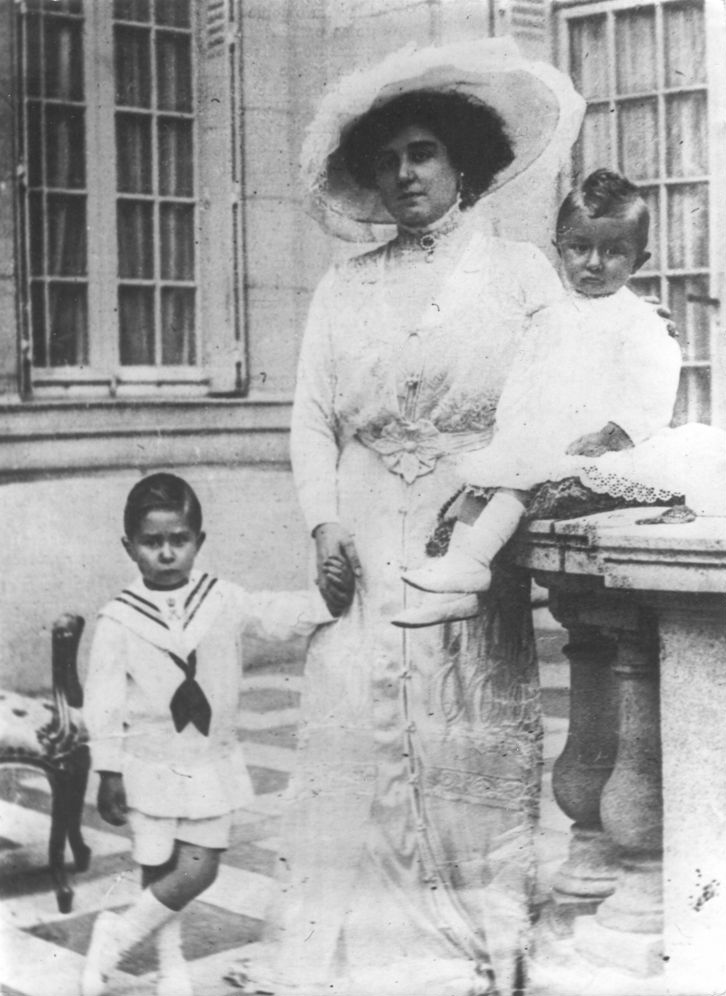
Caroline Lacroix and her children, Lucien, Duke of Tervuren and Philippe, Count of Ravenstein.

Caroline and Leopold had two sons together:

- Lucien Philippe Marie Antoine (9 February 1906 – 15 November 1984), Duke of Tervuren; he married Lucie Gracieuse Mundutey (30 October 1900 – 8 February 2005) on 1 March 1927.
- Philippe Henri Marie François (16 October 1907 – 21 August 1914), Count of Ravenstein; died young.

Like Caroline herself (who was created Baroness Vaughan upon the birth of their first son), the two boys were granted courtesy titles, but no official royal decrees were ever issued by Leopold, the Belgian government, or any other foreign state, causing them to be merely honorary. Because of their parents' legally invalid marriage, their two sons were still deemed illegitimate. Upon each of their births, they had been registered in France under Caroline's name; no mention of Leopold or another potential father was made. Despite these facts, there were fears in Belgium that Leopold would recognize his eldest son as heir to the throne. Had Leopold married in a legal civil ceremony, the boy could have indeed inherited the throne, because all classes were equal under the Belgian constitution, and thus their marriage would not have been considered morganatic. In 1910, the two boys were adopted by Antoine Durrieux, whom Caroline married soon after Leopold's death.

Leopold was devoted to his sons, and much of the wealth Caroline inherited went to the two; she once reportedly boasted that because she was able to marry the king, her sons were in better standings than Charles Beauclerk, 1st Duke of St Albans, the illegitimate son of Nell Gwyn and Charles II of England. Because of these gifts, Caroline was loathed by the Belgian public; on one occasion, her carriage was stoned on the streets of Brussels.

Their second son was born with a deformed hand, leading a cartoon to depict Leopold holding the child surrounded by Congolese corpses with their hands sliced off: the caption said "Vengeance from on high".

== Later years ==
Leopold gave his mistress vast sums of money by investing large sums in her name or confiding in trustees for her benefit. He also arranged for his two sons to be well provided for after his death. Under Belgian law, his three remaining legitimate children were entitled to a considerable portion of his estate, regardless of the contents of his will. However, this applied only in Belgium and not abroad; consequently, much of the wealth he distributed for safekeeping was in foreign investments or in the shape of paintings, bric-a-brac, and art treasures that could be easily converted into cash. Leopold transferred Caroline a fortune in Congo securities, which were added to the already vast sum of six million francs he had previously presented her. Princess Louise soon went after these securities, but with the help of men loyal to the king, Caroline was able to safely spirit away the majority of her wealth to Paris; two of her estates (in Brussels and in France) were boarded up however, disallowing her from entering them.

The exact degree of Caroline's wealth was always difficult to trace, as the king had placed so much of it in different sources often hard to locate and measure both during his lifetime and after his death. One 1912 source for instance reported that out of the king's estimated estate of $65,000,000, Caroline received $7,000,000, while others stressed still higher numbers, and that the majority of it came from Congo shares.

=== Legal suits ===
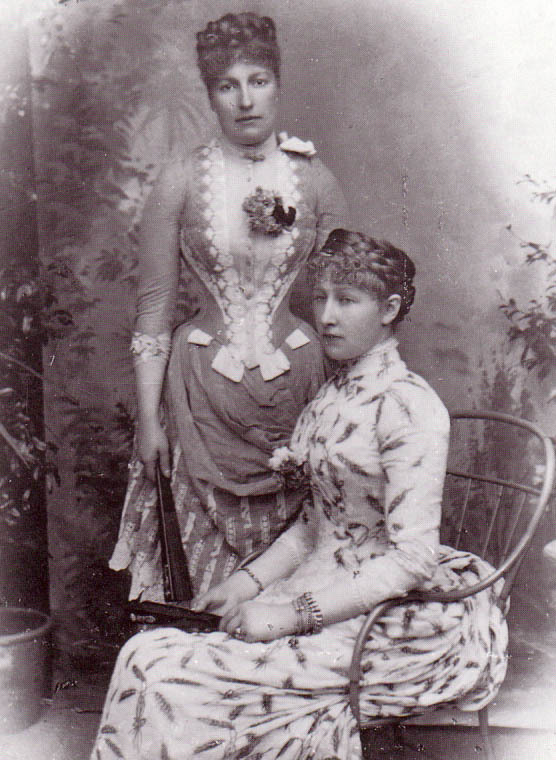
Princesses Stéphanie and Louise, who attempted to gain back their father's wealth from Caroline.

The old king's estrangement from his three daughters from his first marriage (Princesses Louise, Stéphanie, and Clémentine) spurred Leopold to keep or give as much wealth away as possible in order to disinherit the girls. An Austrian newspaper claimed that right before he died, Leopold personally gave Caroline his large collection of personal letters as well as documents detailing information about various European royal figures, which greatly worried his eldest daughter. After his death, the three princesses sued his estate for several million francs, although this was only a very small portion compared with the fortune he accumulated. The fortune was so large that the princesses were still attempting to recover some of Caroline's wealth four years after their father's death, claiming that Caroline and Durrieux had speedily ransacked one of Leopold's properties in Paris and seized important financial documents before the Belgian envoy to France appeared. A trust of $10,000,000 the king had placed in Caroline and their two sons' names became a target of the princesses; they and the Belgian government argued that the trust formed part of Leopold's private estate, and thus all three girls and the government had a right to their share, as its funds had derived from the Congo Free State. The Belgian government's lawsuit succeeded, allowing them to collect the entire trust, but it also diminished the share the princesses received (as each collected a comparatively meager $1,000,000). Belgian statesman Emile Vandervelde later charged in an open letter that Leopold had given Caroline $6,000,000 worth of Congo bonds which had been found to be previously missing when Belgium annexed the colony.

=== Second marriage, divorce and death ===
An extremely rich widow (Leopold's gifts left her a multimillionaire), Caroline continued to appear in newspapers long after Leopold's death. She married Antoine Durrieux (1865–1917), her former love and pimp, in 1910, seven months after the king's death. He was formerly a non-commissioned officer in the French army, and served as her chief agent at the time of Leopold's death, helping her collect the necessary papers to secure her inherited fortune. Because of Durrieux's earlier role in prostituting Caroline off for money, Adam Hochschild speculates that if she had shared some of her riches with him, their arrangement was "surely one of the most successful feats of pimpery of all time". Though Durrieux recognized her two sons as his own offspring, giving them his surname, he disliked how Caroline insisted he acknowledge their noble ranks when in their presence.

Caroline and her second husband divorced soon after, and she was able to keep the bulk of her wealth intact (though she settled on Durrieux a sum of one million dollars in order to retain custody of her two sons). Various suitors often in her entourage, such as Count Boni de Castellane and Gaston Bonnefoy (friend of Toulouse Lautrec), were reported to be engaged or interested in her, particularly after her divorce. She never remarried. Caroline's younger son died in 1914, but the elder lived a long, quiet life on his inherited wealth, dying in 1984.

In 1937, Caroline published her memoirs, a Commoner Married a King: As Told by Baroness De Vaughan to Paul Faure; in it, she stated she had loved and was faithful to the king, and that he had loved her and their two sons. Caroline died on 12 February 1948 in Cambo-les-Bains, Pyrénées-Atlantiques in southern France.
