= Carola Gräfin von Schmettow =

20th and 21st-century German businesswoman

Carola von Schmettow
- Born: Carola Krautwurst; 23 February 1964 (age 62); Düsseldorf, North Rhine-Westphalia, Germany
- Occupation: businesswoman
- Spouse: Johannes von Schmettow

Countess Carola von Schmettow (German: Carola Gräfin von Schmettow, née Krautwurst; born 23 February 1964) is a German businesswoman who served as the chief executive officer of HSBC Trinkaus from 2015 to 2021.

== Early life ==
Carola Krautwurst was born on 23 February 1964 in Düsseldorf. Her father was a civil engineer and her mother was a construction technician. She studied classical music with a concentration on vocal performance at the Robert Schumann Hochschule, graduating in 1989. She later attended the University of Düsseldorf, graduating in 1992 with a degree in mathematics and physical chemistry.

== Career ==
Von Schmettow started her career at HSBC Trinkhaus in 1992 and served as a board member from 2006. In 2014, HSBC named her as chief executive of its German unit HSBC Trinkaus, replacing Andreas Schmitz.

In addition to her role at HSBC Trinkhaus, Von Schmettow served on the board of directors for HSBC France, VV Versicherungsverein des Bankgewerbes, ThyssenKrupp. She also served as chairperson of the management board for Burckhardt Compression, as well as the chairperson of the supervisory board at HSBC Trinkaus Investment Managers and at Internationale Kapitalanlagegesellschaft. She had previously worked as the chief executive officer of HSBC Investments Deutschland GmbH. She was one of Germany's first female business executives in finance.

In 2021, von Schmettow resigned from her positions at HSBC. From 2022, she was the subject of investigations into tax fraud.

== Other activities ==
=== Corporate boards ===
- Barmenia, Member of the Advisory Board (since 2016)
- L-Bank, Member of the Advisory Board
- Eurex Exchange, Chairman of the Exchange Council (since 2017)
- Frankfurt Stock Exchange, Member of the Exchange Council
- Pension Fund for the Finance Industry (BVV), Member of the Supervisory Board
- NRW.Bank, Member of the Advisory Board
- ThyssenKrupp, Member of the Supervisory Board (2012–2020)
- HSBC France, Member of the Board of Directors (2015-2018)

=== Non-profit organizations ===
- Association of German Banks, Member of the Board of Directors
- Deutsche Bundesbank, Member of the Advisory Board for North Rhine-Westphalia
- Fritz Thyssen Foundation, Member of the Board of Trustees
- German Derivatives Association (DDV), Member of the Strategic Board
- Heinrich Heine University Düsseldorf, Member of the Council
- econsense, Member of the Board of Trustees
- Kaiserswerther Diakonie, Member of the Board of Trustees
- Tonhalle Düsseldorf, Member of the Board of Trustees
- ZEIT-Stiftung, Member of the Board of Trustees (since 2014)
- Volkswagen Foundation, Member of the Advisory Board (2011-2014)

== Personal life ==
She is married to Johannes Count von Schmettow and has five children.
