= Dorothy J. Killam =

American-born Canadian philanthropist

- Born: Dorothy Ruth Brooks Johnston; 1900; St. Louis, Missouri
- Died: July 26, 1965 (aged 64–65); Villefranche-sur-Mer, France
- Resting place: Halifax, Nova Scotia
- Occupation: Philanthropist
- Known for: Establishment of the Killam Trusts for higher education in Canada
- Spouse: Izaak Walton Killam (1922–1955)

Dorothy J. Killam (née Dorothy Ruth Brooks Johnston; 1900 – 26 July 1965) was an American-born Canadian philanthropist. She was the wife of Canadian financier Izaak Walton Killam. When he died in 1955 she inherited his fortune and continued to build it until her own death 10 years later. She engaged in philanthropic activity during her lifetime and left her estate to a number of Canadian educational and research institutions.

== Family background ==
Dorothy Ruth Brooks Johnston was born in 1900 in St. Louis, Missouri. Her father, John Thomas Morris Johnston, was a wealthy banker, and her mother was the former Florence Brooks. At the age of 19 her father opened a store in Ashland, Missouri and eight years later established a bank, of which he became president, in the town. He later spent several years as a Baptist minister, while remaining president of the Ashland bank. He was pastor of a church in St. Louis from 1897 to 1907. He then became a history professor at William Jewell College in Liberty, Missouri. He established banks in Kansas City, Missouri, Denison, Texas, and Muskogee, Oklahoma, and returned with his family to St. Louis. By 1915 he was described as a "millionaire St. Louis banker", and was said to be considering running for the United States Senate.

== Marriage ==
Dorothy Johnston met Izaak Walton Killam at a party when she visited a friend in Montreal in 1921. They were married in St. Louis on 5 April 1922. Killam had been president of Royal Securities since 1915, and had bought the brokerage firm from Max Aitken in 1919. He suffered serious financial losses in 1921, but recovered his fortune within a few years and went on to become extremely wealthy, with major interests in pulp and paper and electric power companies, among many others.

The Killams, who had no children, lived primarily in Montreal, where Royal Securities was headquartered. They also had two winter homes in Nassau, Bahamas and an apartment on New York City's Upper East Side. Dorothy Killam collected jewelry and was particularly fond of diamonds. Her collection included the 90-carat Briolette of India diamond. In 1967, after her death, the American jeweler Harry Winston purchased her collection of diamonds and pearls for $4 million.

Dorothy Killam was a lifelong baseball fan. In St. Louis she had supported the St. Louis Browns and after her marriage, she became a fan of the International League's Montreal Royals, the top farm team of the Brooklyn Dodgers. In the 1940s the Killams started spending more time in New York due to Killam's business interests, and Dorothy Killam became a supporter of the Dodgers, attending home games at Ebbets Field. She was so enthusiastic about the team that she offered to buy it from its owner Walter O'Malley for $5 million, but he did not accept the offer.

Killam considered his wife to have "the best business brain of any woman he ever met", and discussed his business affairs with her throughout their married life. In 1954 Killam, in failing health, retired as president of Royal Securities and sold the company to his senior staff. He died at his fishing camp on the Cascapédia River on 5 August 1955. He did not leave a will and his wife inherited his entire estate of $83 million (equivalent to $966.57 million in 2025). Approximately half of this amount went to the Canadian government as estate tax. The government realized a similar sum from the estate of Sir James Dunn, who died less than six months later. The combined tax windfall of $85 million, with an additional $15 million from the government, was used to launch the Canada Council for the Arts in 1957.

== Widowhood ==
Dorothy Killam made tens of millions of dollars by selling the shares she had inherited in her late husband's companies. She continued to increase her fortune, investing heavily in short term bonds. She once bought up a whole issue of Nova Scotia government bonds. In August 1960 the Ladies' Home Journal featured her in an article about "The Richest Women in the World". She lived on the income from her estate, considering the capital to be held "in trust", to be passed on "for the benefit of the country". She and her husband had discussed who should benefit from their wealth. He wanted it to go to Canadian, and especially Nova Scotian, institutions, and universities. He was, however, against "putting money he had made into buildings, into capital expenditures". She was careful to respect his wishes both in the donations she made during her lifetime and in her will.

In the early 1960s, she gave two Canadian institutions anonymous donations of $4,250,000 each. One was to the Canada Council, stipulating that the interest should be used to finance "advanced study or research in medicine, science and engineering by Canadians in Canada", while the other was to Dalhousie University in Halifax, Nova Scotia. Dalhousie University, which awarded her an honorary Doctor of Laws degree in 1962, had already received nearly $400,000.

In June 1959 she was revealed to be one of the three principal backers of the New York franchise in the proposed Continental League, which was to be a third baseball major league. In 1960 she dropped out of the consortium, reportedly for tax reasons related to her Canadian citizenship.

In April 1960 Dorothy Killam became a member of the board of the Metropolitan Opera Association. She was also a benefactress of the company, financing its new productions of La sonnambula in 1963 and Lucia di Lammermoor in 1964.

After her husband's death, she kept the house in Montreal, the two houses in Nassau, and the New York apartment. In 1963, after several summers visiting friends on the French Riviera, she purchased the Villa Leopolda in Villefranche-sur-Mer from Gianni and Marella Agnelli.

Despite her husband's reluctance to fund capital projects, Dorothy Killam wanted to build a memorial in his name. In 1964 she was solicited for a major contribution to the building of a new children's hospital in Halifax. She first pledged $75,000, but soon offered $3 million, later raising that to $5 million. She decided to leave Montreal and bought an apartment in Halifax, which she intended to make her Canadian home. She visited Halifax in May 1965, consulting with the architects and the hospital's board of directors. She also met with the president of Dalhousie University, which she intended to benefit from her estate.

== Legacy ==
Dorothy Killam died at Villa Leopolda on 27 July 1965, leaving an estate worth $93 million. Aside from some personal bequests, which were subject to estate taxes, her fortune was left to institutions and was not subject to tax. She left $8 million toward the construction of the children's hospital in Halifax, which opened in 1970 as the Izaak Walton Killam Hospital for Children.

Her will provided for the establishment of the Killam Trusts, whose stated purpose was

to help in the building of Canada's future by encouraging advanced study... to increase the scientific and scholastic attainments of Canadians, to develop and expand the work of Canadian universities, and to promote understanding between Canadians and peoples of other countries.

Dalhousie University received $30 million, while the University of British Columbia and the University of Alberta were given $14 million and $16 million respectively. The Montreal Neurological Institute and Hospital at McGill University received $4 million. She left a further $12 million to the Canada Council "to establish a fund to provide income for a new program of assistance to advanced research". As of 2021, more than 7800 scholars and researchers have benefited from Killam Trust awards.
