= Martin A. Armstrong =

American self-taught economic forecaster (born 1949)

- Born: Martin Arthur Armstrong; November 1, 1949 (age 77); New Jersey
- Occupation: Forecaster
- Known for: Economic Confidence Model

Martin Arthur Armstrong (born November 1, 1949) is an American economic forecaster who was convicted of a felony for investment fraud. He served 11 years in jail for a Ponzi scheme that cheated investors out of $700 million and hiding $15 million in assets from regulators. Also known for developing the Economic Confidence Model, many of his predictions did not materialize or were criticized.

== Early life and career ==
Armstrong was born on November 1, 1949, in New Jersey. At age thirteen, Armstrong began working at a coin and stamp dealership in Pennsauken, New Jersey. At age fifteen, he bought a bag of rare Canadian pennies that for a brief period would have made him a millionaire had he sold them before they crashed in value. After viewing The Toast of New York in high school, Armstrong came to believe that assets do not appreciate linearly over time and that historically some manner of economic panic occurs every 8.6 years. His economic philosophy was influenced by his father, a lawyer whose grandfather had lost a fortune in the Wall Street Crash of 1929. After finishing high school, Armstrong briefly attended RCA Institutes (now TCI College of Technology) in New York City and audited courses at Princeton University but did not obtain a college degree.

After becoming the manager of his employer's store at the age of twenty-one, he and a partner opened a store for coin and stamp collectors. Armstrong progressed from investments in gold coins to following commodity prices for precious metals. In 1973, Armstrong began publishing commodities market predictions as a hobby. As his coin and stamp business declined, he spent more time on his commodities ventures, launching a paid newsletter in 1983. Soon after, he was accused of mail fraud and not paying taxes on gold bullion sales. He took the case to the U.S. Supreme Court and lost. He was required to pay $600,000 in back taxes. By September 1987, his debts totaled $4.4m, including $2.7m in unpaid taxes. He filed for personal bankruptcy in September 1987. Armstrong has since traded under various business names, including Princeton Economics International, Princeton Economic Consultants, Inc., Economic Consultants of Princeton, Inc., and Armstrong Report, Inc.

== Economic Confidence Model ==
Armstrong's Economic Confidence Model is an economic cycle theory that proposes that economic waves occur every 8.6 years, or 3141 days, which is approximately $\pi \times 1000$. At the end of each cycle is a crisis after which the economic climate improves until the next 8.6 year crisis point. The theory is based on a list of historical financial panics (26 in 224 years, between 1683 and 1907), producing a frequency of roughly 8.6 years. Armstrong concluded that a wave of 8.6 years moved through larger waves building in intensity amounting to six waves of 8.6 years constructing a major long wave of 51.6 years. Also key are quarter-cycles of 2.15 years. Armstrong kept his cycle secret and The New Yorker commented that Armstrong suggested that his models were rooted in certain fundamentals and complex computer calculations rather than in a simple mystical number. Cornell University economist Karel Mertens described the model's 8.6-year cycle as fitting only a handful of past U.S. recessions coincidentally, calling it "comparable to numerology."

=== Predictions ===
According to The New Yorker, Armstrong's theory was initially applied in 1977 when he used it to successfully predict an upturn in the price of commodities. On June 27, 1998, Armstrong was quoted in the Financial Times predicting that the Russian financial troubles would prove to be more damaging to Europe than the 1997 Asian financial crisis. Other commentators argued that only countries with strong ties to Russia (e.g. Germany and smaller eastern European countries) would be severely affected. This turned out to be closer to the truth, with the British FTSE100 and French CAC 40 having fully recovered by December and the German DAX reaching pre-crisis levels by November the next year. In later years, Armstrong frequently claimed on his blog that he predicted the economic collapse itself, further alleging that this prediction drew the attention of the CIA; however, the possibility of a collapse was already well understood weeks earlier. Justin Fox wrote in Time that Armstrong's model "made several eerily on-the-mark calls using a formula based on the mathematical constant pi." In Barron's, Robin Blumenthal observed that the model called for a change in sentiment in June 2011. According to Paul Mason writing in The Guardian, Armstrong incorrectly predicted that a sovereign debt crisis, or "Big Bang" as he called it, would begin on October 1, 2015.

== CFTC violations ==
In 1985, Armstrong was found to have violated Commodity Futures Trading Commission (CFTC) regulations by failing to register as a commodity trading advisor, failing to deliver required disclosure documents to clients, and failing to maintain proper records. In 1987, one of Armstrong's trading entities, Economic Consultants of Princeton Inc., was charged with failing to disclose a commission sharing agreement, and another of his entities, Princeton Economic Consultants Inc, was charged with misrepresenting hypothetical performance results and omitting a required disclaimer in advertisements. The penalties levied banned Armstrong and his companies from trading for twelve months, revoked their registrations, imposed cease-and-desist orders, and levied civil penalties totalling fifty thousand dollars.

== Criminal conviction ==
In 1999, Japanese fraud investigators accused Armstrong of collecting money from Japanese investors, improperly commingling these funds with funds from other investors, and using the fresh money to cover losses he had incurred while trading. United States prosecutors called it a three-billion-dollar Ponzi scheme. Allegedly assisting Armstrong in his scheme was the Republic New York Corporation, which produced false account statements to reassure Armstrong's investors. In 2001, the bank agreed to pay $606 million as restitution for its part in the scandal.

Armstrong was indicted in 1999 and ordered by Judge Richard Owen to turn over fifteen million dollars in gold bars and antiquities bought with the fund's money; the list included bronze helmets and a bust of Julius Caesar. Armstrong produced some of the items but claimed the others were not in his possession; this led to several contempt of court charges brought by the U.S. Securities and Exchange Commission and CFTC, for which he served seven years in jail until he reached a plea bargain with federal prosecutors. Under the terms of the agreement, Armstrong admitted to deceiving corporate investors and improperly commingling client funds—actions that according to prosecutors resulted in commodities losses of more than $700 million—and was sentenced to five years in prison.

Armstrong was released from federal custody on 2 September 2011 after serving a total of eleven years behind bars. The case against Armstrong was finally closed in 2017, with the distribution of about $80 million to claim holders by the receiver according to court filings. Armstrong appealed the refusal of the receiver to transport his remaining possessions from storage lockers in New York and Pennsylvania to him in Florida, but the appeal failed in 2019. Concerning his felony conviction, Armstrong is "unrepentant" according to Bloomberg News. In 2014, Italian comedian, activist, and Five Star Movement founder Beppe Grillo's cited an article by L'Antidiplomatico that quoted Armstrong as supporting Grillo's anti-euro views and calls for a referendum on the issue, and presented him as a historian who described Grillo as a prominent figure of the struggle for democracy and cited The Economist article "Send in the clowns" (in reference to Grillo and Silvio Berlusconi) to establish Armstrong as an expert holding the opposite view of The Economist. On his website, Armstrong described himself as a "world-renowned" historian and economist, an influencer on Ronald Reagan, and a friend of Margaret Thatcher, without mentioning other details of his biography, such as his criminal conviction.

=== Hidden rare coins cache ===
In 2014, a day laborer sold a box of 58 rare coins to a Philadelphia thrift shop for $6,000, which he said he had found while clearing out the basement of a house in New Jersey. In 2017, when the thrift shop announced they were to auction the coins and they actually valued at $2.5 million, Armstrong came forward to declare himself the rightful owner. He claimed that he had hidden the coins in his mother's old house to take them "off the books" in anticipation of the public offering of his firm. The thrift shop sued Armstrong, asking the court to declare the thrift shop as rightful owners while Armstrong counter-sued, also seeking ownership. In 2019, the U.S. government learned about the coins and claimed them as part of the treasure hoard Armstrong had refused to hand over in 1999, and for which he had served seven years in jail for contempt. In addition to rare coins, the treasure hoard, valued at $12.9 million, included 102 gold bars, 699 gold coins, and an ancient bust of Julius Caesar. Armstrong was deposed. According to Receiver Alan M. Cohen, Armstrong admitted hiding the coins. Armstrong's attorneys said in a court filing that Armstrong did not make this admission. The auction house now possesses the coins and the U.S. government filed suit to take possession.

== Documentary film ==
The 2014 documentary film The Forecaster tells the story of Armstrong's financial model, his imprisonment, and release. It was directed by Marcus Vetter and Karin Steinberger and co-produced by Arte. The film presents Armstrong's claims that he is innocent, that the bank involved was at fault, that he was coerced into admitting to fraud, and that the FBI was after his economic model. Representatives of the United States Department of Justice were not interviewed in the film. A Los Angeles Times critic described the film as "intended primarily as a name-clearing platform for Armstrong to relate his version of the events" and that it lacked perspective due to its failure to present commentary from authorities. A New York Times critic decried the film's "one-sided assertions and insinuations" and "less than skeptical" tone. A Washington Post critic observed that "though the Armstrong partisans in the film strongly suggest that [his models work], director Marcus Vetter struggles to convince the lay viewer."

== Climate change ==
According to DeSmog, Armstrong has frequently posted on his website denying the existence of man-made climate change. He claimed in 2018, "Climate is changing and it is part of the normal cycle – not human-induced", and in June 2016 that "Britain is moving into an Ice Age".

== Personal life ==
Armstrong is divorced and has a son and a daughter.
