= Ida Liu =

U.S. corporate executive from Citi Private Bank

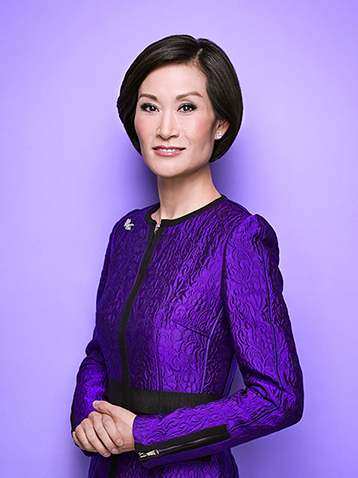
- Born: Orinda, California, U.S.
- Education: Wellesley College (BA)
- Occupation: Finance executive
- Title: Chief Executive Officer, HSBC Private Bank
- Children: 2

Ida Liu (劉宏敏) is an American banking executive and the Chief Executive Officer of HSBC Private Bank, a position she assumed in January 2026. Prior to this role, she served as Global Head of Citi Private Bank, after having led the firm's North American private bank.

== Early life and education ==
Raised in Orinda, California by Mandarin speaking parents, Liu holds a B.A. with honors from Wellesley College. She speaks fluent Mandarin and Spanish.

== Career ==
=== Early career ===
Liu started her career in 1998 as a mergers & acquisitions investment banker at BT Wolfensohn, now part of Deutsche Bank.

She joined Merrill Lynch's investment bank in 1999 and worked in both New York and Hong Kong, focusing on China and Taiwan deals in the technology, media and telecom sectors.

In 2004, Liu was appointed Global Head of Sales, Marketing and Business Development at womenswear designer Vivienne Tam. During her tenure, she launched the Vivienne Tam Dress line, and established flagship stores in China.

=== Citi Private Bank ===
Liu began her career at Citi Private Bank in 2007 by launching and heading the Fashion, Retail and Entertainment Group.

In 2011, she founded Citi Private Bank's newly formed North America Asian Clients Group before becoming Global Market Manager for New York in 2016.

In 2019, she was promoted to head the Private Bank in North America.

In 2021, Liu was appointed Global Head of Private Banking until her departure in early 2025.

=== HSBC Private Bank ===
In January 2026, Liu was appointed Chief Executive Officer of HSBC Private Bank.

=== Diversity and inclusion ===
Liu is an advocate for diversity, inclusion, and gender equality in the workplace.

She served on Citi's Asian Heritage Affinity, becoming its Co-Lead in November 2021 and she has spoken at the Milken Institute Global Conference on inclusivity for the Asian American and Pacific Island heritage (AAPI) community.

Liu was a member of the Citi Women Steering Committee, a company-wide effort that is "designed to attract, develop, advance and retain female talent at all levels of the company." She also served as Chair of the Citi Women's International Women's Day celebrations globally.

=== External board memberships ===
Liu is a trustee and board member of the Asia Society.

She is the senior sponsor of recruiting for her alma mater, Wellesley College, where she was previously a board member of the Alumnae Association.

Liu is a Young Global Leader (YGL) of the World Economic Forum and was one of five Citi delegates at Davos in 2019 to discuss opportunities and trends in global finance and investment.

She is also a member of The Committee of 100 and Young Presidents' Organization.

== Personal life ==
Liu is the daughter of Peter Yeau-Hwan Liu, a venture capitalist who is the Founder and Chairman of WI Harper Group. Liu and her father have simultaneously been participants at the World Economic Forum at Davos.

She is married with two children.

== Awards and honors ==
Liu has been named among Barron's 100 Most Influential Women in U.S. Finance consecutively every year since 2020 and among the 10 Most Influential Women in Wealth Management consecutively every year since 2020.

American Banker named Liu as one of the 25 Most Powerful Women in Finance consecutively every year since 2020.

Liu has also been included in Crain's Notable Women on Wall Street in 2021 and 2022, as well as in Crain's 40 Under 40.

Liu received the Citi Chairman's Council Award for six consecutive years as one of the firm's top performers between 2007 and 2014.

In 2023, Liu was presented with an Ellis Island Medal of Honor.

In 2025, Liu was formally invested as a Dame of the Royal Order of Francis I, founded by the Royal House of Bourbon in 1829. This honor is awarded to recipients whose work has made notable impacts in their respective fields and communities.
