= TCI College of Technology =

Private college in New York City, New York, (1909–2017)

Coordinates: 40.75047°N 73.99573°W

- Former names: Marconi Institute, RCA Institutes, Technical Career Institutes
- Type: Two-year Technical College
- Active: 1909–2017
- President: George Santiago Jr. (2016–2017)
- Provost: Clotilde Dillon
- Location: New York City, New York, US
- Website: tcicollege.edu

Technical Career Institutes, also known as TCI College, was a private, for-profit college in New York City that offered two year associate degrees and certificates for education in technology, business, engineering, healthcare and other career paths. It was dually accredited from the New York State Board of Regents and by the Middle States Commission on Higher Education. TCI's curricula offered training at the associate degree level taught by more than 190 faculty.

== History ==
The school was founded in 1909 by Guglielmo Marconi as the Marconi Institute. By 1919 the school changed its name to RCA Institutes and then in 1974 it became Technical Career Institutes.

In 2009–2010 TCI had a 24% graduation rate and a 34.9% loan default rate, earning it the title from USA Today news as a "red flag school". It is not uncommon for for-profit colleges to have high rates of student loan default, which prompted a New York City Department of Consumer Affairs investigation in 2015.

On December 31, 2012, TCI was brought under the corporate control of EVCI Career Colleges Holding Corporation.

In May 2016, TCI named Dr. George Santiago, Jr. the president and CEO, he served until the schools closure in 2017.

A 2017 research study "Mobility Report Cards: The Role of Colleges in Intergenerational Mobility" done by Equality of Opportunity project on income mobility rates for low-income students named TCI the fourth top college in the United States for mobility. However additional research studies will need to be completed in order to better understand how and why some schools are performing better than others.

=== Closure ===
TCI's website states "On September 1, 2017, TCI College closed its doors". According to the New York State Department of Labor, Worker Adjustment and Retraining Notification (WARN) submission the close was based on economic factors.

== Notable people ==
=== Alumni ===
- Martin A. Armstrong, creator of the Economic Confidence Model
- Iran Darroudi, artist, studied television direction and production.
- Ronny Lee, American guitarist and arranger.

=== Faculty ===
- Rivka Bertisch Meir, 2005–2012 visiting professor of Health Sciences

== See also ==
- List of defunct colleges and universities in New York
