= Ronny Lee =

American singer-songwriter

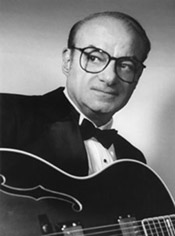

Background information
- Born: Ronald Leventhal; March 2, 1927; Bronx, New York, U.S.
- Died: April 22, 2015 (aged 88)
- Genres: Jazz
- Occupations: Musician, teacher
- Instrument: Guitar
- Years active: 1943–2005
- Formerly of: Eydie Gorme, Fran Warren, New York Philharmonic
- Website: ronnylee.com

Ronald Leventhal (March 2, 1927 – April 22, 2015), known professionally as Ronny Lee, was an American guitarist who wrote method books and taught at Kingsborough Community College of the City University of New York. He wrote popular, classical, and rock guitar arrangements for Hansen Publications, Sam Fox Publishing Company, and Alfred Music. He conducted workshops and seminars for music teachers was a judge at music festivals.

Lee performed in clubs, in jazz, rock and pop recording sessions, at resort hotels, and in a concert with the New York Philharmonic. He accompanied singers Eydie Gormé and Fran Warren.

== Early years ==
Ronald Leventhal was born in the Bronx, New York on March 2, 1927. He was an only child, the son of Abraham Leventhal and Shirley Edelstein. At the age of twelve his aunt presented him with a guitar she had won in a raffle.

Leventhal was educated at the William Taft High School. At the age of fourteen his interest in music became quite strong, and he began to devote much more time to playing. His father, sensing his son's greatly increased interest, bought Ronald Leventhal a D'Angelico guitar.

At sixteen—having adopted the professional name Ronny Lee—he appeared as a featured soloist on local radio station WNEW's Bobby Sox Canteen Show. As the show was being prepared to go on network radio, Lee turned eighteen and was drafted "shortly after his eighteenth birthday".

Since that birthday was March 2, 1945, we can assume he would have arrived at a military camp by April 1, 1945. If Lee was drafted into the U. S. Army ground forces to serve as a rifleman—the most needed speciality, he would then have received 17 weeks of training before being considered ready to report to a front-line unit. By August 1, 1945, World War II had been over in Europe for nearly 3 months. After the first atomic bomb was successfully exploded at Alamogordo on July 16, and even more after atomic bombs were dropped on Japan on August 6 and 9, it was obvious that a U. S. land invasion of the main islands of Japan would not be necessary.

When Lee was discharged, he studied engineering—funded by the G. I. Bill—at the RCA Institutes of Technology. At the same time he played club dates and taught guitar to a limited number of students.

Lee studied guitar privately with Shadow Ferber, Anthony Antone, John Sigelitto, Nicholas DeBonis, Hy White, Charles Ruoff, and Juan De la Mata—with whom he later wrote "Flamenco Guitar Method".

== Musician ==
At the end of his studies, Lee decided to become a professional musician. He worked with "society" orchestras, and filled out his daily schedule by teaching guitar students at their homes. He played at resort hotels in the Catskills and New Jersey during the summer months, often as a classical and jazz soloist or accompanying recording stars There Lee acquired experience as a "pit musician"; he frequently read from violin and conductor parts while backing up vocal, dance, comedy, and novelty acts.

From 1959 Lee began accepting dates for occasional recording sessions. Over the years he accompanied such singers as Eydie Gormé and Fran Warren.

Lee's first appearance at Carnegie Hall was as guitar accompanist to the Pilar Gomez Spanish Ballet troupe in 1962. In March 1968 Lee played in a Lincoln Center benefit concert for the New York Philharmonic Orchestra's Pension Fund, in a concert version of Oklahoma! featuring Howard Da Silva, who played Jud Fry in the original Broadway production. The performance was conducted by Skitch Henderson, with Richard Rodgers himself coming out to conduct the Encore. In 1969, Lee played tenor banjo and guitar with the Philharmonic, under the direction of Andre Kostelanetz—with Veronica Tyler and Robert Mosley—performing excerpts from the Gershwins' Porgy and Bess.

== Teacher and technical expert ==
Lee opened his first guitar studio in November 1954. He created many original lessons for his students, thus beginning his writing career. Aided by his wife Frances—whom he married in 1957—he opened a larger midtown Manhattan studio and store in 1959 at 255 West 55th St., employing four guitar instructors. Visitors to the studio included astronauts (as store customers) John Glenn and Scott Carpenter, numerous show business personalities, and many of the nation's leading guitarists.

At Kingsborough Community College of the City University of New York, Lee taught Jazz alongside his colleagues Lee Konitz, famed jazz saxophonist, and guitarist Robert Spellman in the Music Division—directed by Morris Lang—of the Center for the Performing Arts. He was appointed guitar editor of Guitar World Magazine, for which he also wrote the Guitar Book Review column.

Lee's repeatedly-expressed view was that "It is quite possible for the student to devote one half hour to one hour of adequate music practice each day and make adequate progress on his instrument." He taught guitar teachers at a Louisville KY convention in 1964, at a Pittsburgh PA sponsored workshop in the spring of 1968, at a Des Plaines IL convention in July 1977, and at a Cumberland MD sponsored workshop in June 1979. Lee also officiated as an adjudicator at major music festivals.

Using his engineering background, Lee invented an electronic "guitar conversion kit" that converted an electric guitar into a bass guitar in 5 seconds. It was sold by Imperial Creations in New York for $12.50. Lee studied further at New York University from 1969 to 1971. From 1972 to at least 1983, Automated Learning Inc. in New Jersey was selling Lee's cassette-recorder-based "programmed instruction" course "Instant Guitar".

Lee was "recognized as an authority on the guitar", and was "often consulted by manufacturers on various technical aspects of guitars and guitar accessories"; a measure of his reputation for expertise is that he was able to sell this same article to another magazine. In 1971 Buegeleisen and Jacobson took out an ad to publicize his endorsement of the Espana EL-240 electrical-acoustic bass for his students.

== Writer ==
For Hansen Publications in 1964, Lee arranged the music from the Beatles' "A Hard Day's Night" for guitar. For Williamson Music in 1966, he arranged "The Sound of Music : selection for guitar solo". Also in 1966, for Sam Fox Publishing Co. Lee arranged "Guitar selections from Man of La Mancha". For Sam Fox Publishing Co. in 1972, he arranged "Magical Melodies: for guitar"——which included music and lyrics by Lerner and Loewe and John Denver.

In the early 1960s Lee wrote more than 40 guitar instruction books for various publishers. These included "Folk Strums for Guitar", "Beginner's Chord Book", "Rock 'N' Roll Guitar Book", and "Classic Guitar Book". In 1964 Alfred Music called Lee "undoubtedly the 'hottest' writer of fretted instrument instruction books today. He specializes in 'instant best sellers' as it is not unusual to have pre-publication orders running in the thousands before his book is off the press." In 1971 Alfred considered Lee's "Ronny Lee Guitar Method" so saleable that it bought the back cover of a Musical Merchandise Review issue to advertise it. By 1979 he had increased this to more than 80 guitar instruction books. Alfred Music is still selling Lee's "Christmas Guitar Book" and "Beginners's Chord Book". However his "Twist Music for Guitar" and "Rhythm and Blues for Guitar", books of original compositions written for Sam Fox Publishing Co., are among those no longer in print.

One of Lee’s most enduring works is the two-volume Jazz Guitar Method, published by Mel Bay Publications in 1962. The instructional series focused on jazz rhythm chords, chord accompaniment, and chord substitution techniques. As of 2015, Mel Bay continued to publish the material as a combined single-volume edition in both print and eBook formats.[1]

By 1974 Lee had written two new series of thoroughly graded, easy to follow guitar instruction books: "The Ronny Lee Step by Step Guitar Method" in 6 volumes, and "The Ronny Lee Step by Step Chord Method for Guitar" in 4 volumes. He retained or re-acquired the copyrights to these series and they are still being sold at his own website, together with "Advanced Chord Playing for Guitar by Ronny Lee" in 2 volumes that he published in 1979-80. The two principles that Lee followed in these series are that (1) note playing and chord playing should be taught separately—even if simultaneously, and that (2) step-by-step means that the student should never be obliged to make any mental leaps—as competing method books often do. He expanded the step-by-step principle with "Learn to Sing Step by Step", which he published with two cassette tapes (now reissued as CDs) in 1984.

== Later years ==
Because Lee became fully occupied with writing by 1964, he had to discontinue his studio. He chose not to sell it because he did not wish to sell the right to use his name. By 1971 he was teaching guitar and bass guitar students at his Midtown Manhattan home. For some time after 1984, Lee visited Veterans Administration hospitals with Bedside Network Hospital Show Tours #9 "Sophisticated Misbehavin'", a five-person group of show business artists sponsored by ASCAP who interpreted the music of "Fats" Waller and "Duke" Ellington. He published the guitar method "Learn How to Play Any Song by Ear" in 2011—writing the text on his computer despite having developed macular degeneration. At age 85 in 2012, Lee recorded a performance of Jobim's "The Girl from Ipanema" for Raf Moscatel's forthcoming film about Mary Small —who had studied guitar with Lee when she was 50 (and he 45 in 1972) and became a friend. He died on April 22, 2015, at Mount Sinai Hospital in New York, a widower since 2005 who had chosen hospice care, and was cremated at his own request.

== Legacy ==
In 1962, Gretsch Guitars named 2 guitars for players: one for Chet Atkins, and one for Ronny Lee. The Ronny Lee guitar is now coveted by collectors of guitars the world over.
