= Villa La Léopolda =

French villa

Coordinates: 43.709381°N 7.321187°E

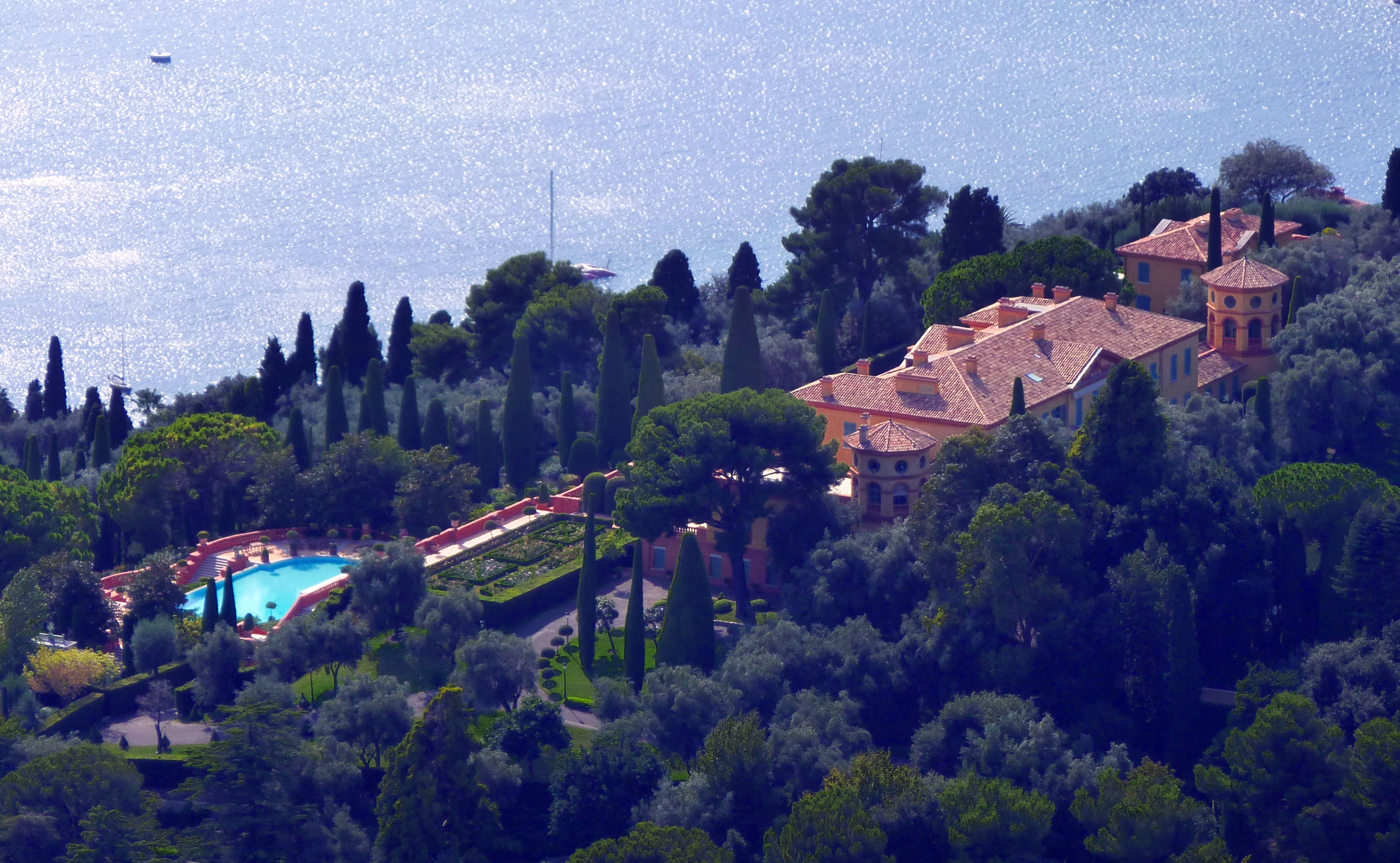
The Villa Leopolda at Vilefranche-sur-Mer taken from the road of la Condamine.

The Villa La Léopolda is a large detached villa in Villefranche-sur-Mer, in the Alpes-Maritimes department on the French Riviera. The villa is situated in 7.3 hectares (18 acres) of grounds. The villa has had several notable owners including Gianni and Marella Agnelli, Izaak and Dorothy J. Killam, and, since 1987, by Edmond (1932–1999) and Lily Safra (1934–2022), who inherited the villa after her husband's death.

== History ==
Villa La Leopolda in its current incarnation was designed and built from 1929 to 1931 by the American architect, Ogden Codman, Jr., on an estate once owned by King Leopold II of Belgium. Leopold had made the previous estate a present for his mistress Blanche Zélia Joséphine Delacroix, also known as Caroline Lacroix, and it derives its name from him. After Leopold's death, Blanche Delacroix was evicted, and his nephew, King Albert I, became its owner. During World War I, it was used as a military hospital.

In 1919, Thérèse Vitali, Comtesse de Beauchamp, acquired the property and commissioned modifications. Ogden Codman, Jr. purchased the dozen existing structures that made up the property (which included two peasant cottages) and began his architectural magnum opus in 1929. It was completed by 1931. However financial difficulties (and his lavish expenditures) precluded his being able to live in it, so he rented it out to various wealthy tenants. One famous English couple tried to lease it but insisted on making changes that were contrary to Codman's aesthetic objectives and strict list of protective clauses. Negotiations in a Paris Hotel room broke down over the many restrictions Codman imposed, and Ogden's response was: "I regret that the House of Codman is unable to do business with the House of Windsor." Codman's extensive designs and construction gave the estate, once a series of unrelated buildings, its current appearance. His neo-Palladian vision, coupled with his in-depth knowledge of historical precedent, resulted in the construction of a spectacular villa with extensive gardens and landscaping. Floor plans, letters, records, and stereo glass-plate views of the newly completed property still exist in the collections of the Society for the Preservation of New England Antiquities (a.k.a. Historic New England) At Codman's death in 1951, the estate was sold to Izaak Walton Killam whose wife, Canadian philanthropist Dorothy J. Killam, inherited the place after his death. In the later 1950s she sold it to Fiat president Gianni Agnelli (1921–2003) and Marella Agnelli.

The Agnellis sold the Villa Leopolda back to Dorothy J. Killam in 1963, and she resided at the villa until her death in 1965.

== Edmond and Lily Safra ==
In 1987 La Leopolda had become one of the properties owned by the Lebanese born Brazilian banker Edmond Safra and his wife, Lily. The Safras commissioned Renzo Mongiardino as interior designer, while the second-floor bedrooms were decorated by Mica Ertegün. The Safras held large parties at the villa, and, at a 1988 party, female guests were given an enameled box with a portrait of the Villa Leopolda. Safra's guest list was so vast that there was a party on the Saturday and a second party on the Monday. Tulips were airlifted in from Holland, the food was arranged by the famed chef Roger Vergé of the Moulin de Mougins, and the music was provided by Safra's favourite musicians, the Brazilian band leader Sérgio Mendes who had flown in from California with his entire orchestra, and pianist David Wood who had flown in from the UK with his quartet. The party was described by author John Fairchild as the "ultimate in conspicuous consumption". The banker Bill Browder recounted visiting Safra at the Villa Leopolda with Beny Steinmetz in his 2014 memoir Red Notice. Security was provided for Safra at the villa by a team of former Israeli commando soldiers. The Safras lived some 10 miles from the Villa Leopolda, in a penthouse apartment in Monaco.

The Safras still own Villa Leopolda.The last known owner Lily Safra (Born as Lily Watkins) died on 9 July 2022 in Geneva, Switzerland.

=== Mikhail Prokhorov ===
The Russian billionaire businessman Mikhail Prokhorov made several attempts via Ignace Meuwissen to buy the Villa Leopolda from Safra before she finally accepted his offer for €370 million (plus €19.5 million for the villa's furniture) in the summer of 2008. Initial reports on the villa's sale in July 2008 had falsely identified fellow Russian oligarch Roman Abramovich as the purchaser. Prokhorov would later deny that he had bought the property, with his spokesperson saying that he had refused to do business in France after his 2007 detention by French police for allegedly providing prostitutes for guests at Courchevel, the ski resort in the French Alps. No charges were ever filed against Prokhorov in the prostitution case.

Prokhorov attempted to withdraw from the sale in the wake of the 2008 financial crisis, which led to a lawsuit between Prokhorov and Safra over the €39 million deposit that he had paid on the villa. A French court ruled against Prokhorov in November 2012 with Safra subsequently announcing that she would donate his deposit to various global charities.

== Architectural monument ==
La Leopolda invokes the style of the Belle Époque. It is listed in the general inventory of architectural heritage of the Région Provence-Alpes-Côte d'Azur.

== In popular culture ==
The villa was used as the location of Lermontov's villa in 1948 film The Red Shoes. The heroine climbs the steps to the villa thinking that she's been invited to dinner. Instead she would be given the starring role in the new ballet.

Alfred Hitchcock used La Leopolda as a set in his 1955 movie To Catch a Thief. There's a different reference saying that the house used in the To Catch a Thief is Château de la Croix-des-Gardes, 145 Boulevard Leader, in Cannes, not Villa Leopolda, in Villefranche-sur-Mer. "
