= Trade Development Bank =

Former Geneva-based bank

Trade Development Bank (TDB) was a private Geneva-based bank built by Edmond Safra, who also founded Brazil's sixth largest bank, Banco Safra, in the 1950s. Beginning with only US$1 million in funds, TDB grew into the flagship of Safra’s international banking empire, with nearly US$5 billion in deposits by the early 1980s. TDB's mode of banking was different from much of that done in the Western world, as it relied on intimacy and familiarity with depositors' personalities rather than balance sheets and hard numbers.

In 1983, Safra sold TDB for US$550 million to American Express. The acquisition was part of a plan by American Express chairman Jim Robinson to break into the private depositor banking industry; TDB was intended to be the third arm of American Express's financial empire, reaching wealthy, international private depositors. In exchange for TDB, Safra was inducted to the board of American Express.

However, TDB quickly realized that American Express was unable to uphold promises which had encouraged them to accept the deal, and that they had been excluded from important company decisions, such as the US$1 billion acquisition of Minneapolis financial services firm Investors Diversified Services. TDB was only notified of the Investors deal after their executives received a dispatch fresh from the Dow Jones news wire. Among other incidents, there was also a public announcement by American Express of a US$242 million earnings loss due to excessive insurance claims paid out through their California-based insurance company, Fireman's Fund. The claims contributed to American Express's first yearly net earnings loss; TDB was not given any warning of this.

After the claims incident, Safra tried to separate TDB from its parent company. When American Express repeatedly refused to sell TDB back to him, he went on to open a competing bank. In response, American Express acted on its suspicions about Safra's business activities, reporting to the media that he was being investigated by the FBI for involvement in the Iran–Contra affair, in addition to drug trafficking and collaboration with the mafia. These accusations were later confirmed to be false by Harry Freeman, Robinson's right-hand man and public relations chief; he would eventually resign from American Express. In July 1989, American Express publicly apologized to Safra and donated US$8 million to a charity of his choice.

In 1989, American Express sold its Swiss banking operations to Compagnie de Banque et d’Investissements.
