= Avidan =

Avidan (Hebrew: אבידן) is a surname of Hebrew origin. Notable people with this surname include:

- Asaf Avidan (born 1980), Israeli singer-songwriter and musician.
- Dan Avidan (born 1979), American musician, Internet personality, singer-songwriter and comedian of Israeli descent.
- David Avidan (1934–1995), Israeli poet, painter, filmmaker, publicist, and playwright.
- Shimon Avidan (1911–1994), Israeli soldier and officer, commander of the Givati Brigade during the 1948 Arab–Israeli War.
