= C.G. Trinkaus =

German financial services company

Coordinates: 51.2245°N 6.7782°E

HSBC Trinkaus & Burkhardt AG

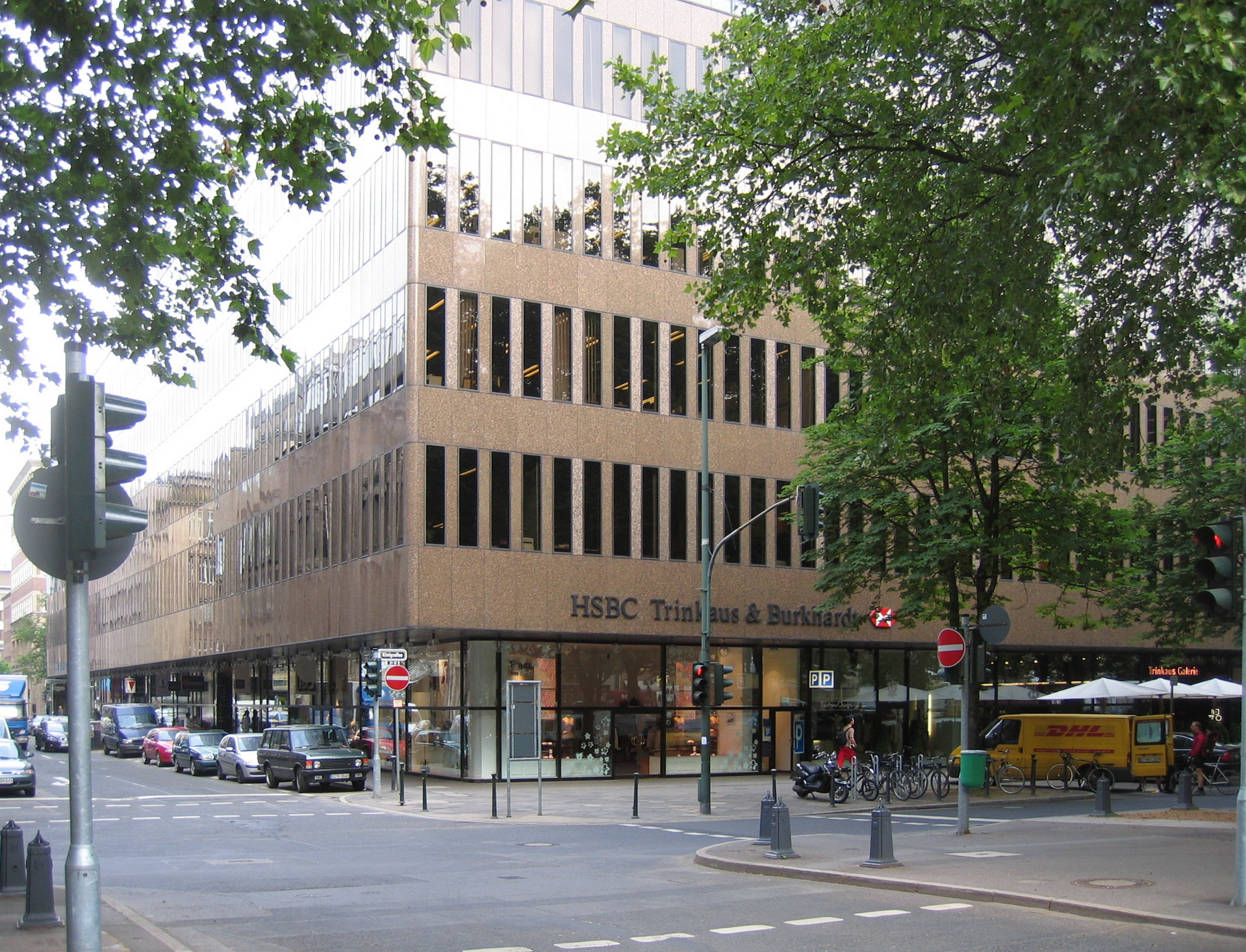
- Trinkaus head office in Düsseldorf
- Company type: Subsidiary
- Industry: Finance and insurance
- Founded: 1785; 241 years ago
- Headquarters: Düsseldorf, Germany
- Key people: Carola von Schmettow (Chief Executive Officer)
- Products: Financial services
- Number of employees: 2,700
- Parent: HSBC (99.3%)
- Website: www.hsbc.de

C.G. Trinkaus, known as such from 1852 until 1972 then as Trinkaus & Burkhardt (1972-1999) and HSBC Trinkaus & Burkhardt (1999-2023), was a German financial services company. It traced its history back to 1785 and was thus one of the longest-established members of the HSBC Group following integration into that group in 1992.

In 2023, the company was merged with HSBC's Paris-based subsidiary HSBC Continental Europe. Its operations subsequently form the German branch of HSBC Continental Europe, covering both commercial and investment banking, with head office in Düsseldorf and additional offices in Baden-Baden, Berlin, Dortmund, Frankfurt, Hamburg, Hanover, Cologne, Mannheim, Munich, Nuremberg, Stuttgart as well as Vienna in Austria.

== History ==
In 1785 Christian Gottfried Jäger established his trading house in Düsseldorf. Then in 1852 Christian Gottfried Trinkaus, one of the founder's nephews, took over the firm, named it after himself, and focused exclusively on banking from then on. From 1919 on, the company came under the ownership of institutional investors, especially Deutsche Bank, as the last family members exited the bank.

The next landmark occurred in 1972 when C.G. Trinkaus merged with Bankhaus Burkhardt & Co, which had been founded in Essen in 1841. Under the name of Trinkaus & Burkhardt the bank extended its operations to Luxembourg and Switzerland. Two years later, Citibank, of the US, acquired majority ownership.

In 1980, the UK-based Midland Bank acquired a majority stake in Trinkaus & Burkhardt. Five years later, Trinkaus & Burkhardt converted to a partnership limited by shares (Kommanditgesellschaft auf Aktien - KGaA) and listed on the stock exchange.

HSBC acquired Midland Bank in 1992, and with it Midland's majority stake in Trinkaus & Burkhardt. In time, HSBC transferred Trinkaus and Burkhardt's operations in Switzerland to its subsidiary there, HSBC Guyerzeller Bank. In 1999, the bank in Germany changed its name to HSBC Trinkaus & Burkhardt KGaA. Lastly, in 2006, the bank changed its legal form and became HSBC Trinkaus & Burkhardt AG. In 2010, on its 225th anniversary, HSBC in Germany increased the share capital by EUR 150 million to promote the corporate business in Germany as part of HSBC. In 2013 the Growth Initiative started with the aim to position HSBC in Germany as leading international bank for German customers.

The bank was managed by five general partners under an unusual German partnership arrangement. On November 29, 2005 the partners voted to convert the bank to AG or limited company status, and in August 2006, HSBC Trinkaus & Burkhardt completed its transition from a German limited partnership (KGaA) to a corporation limited by shares (AG).

In 2014, HSBC generated a pre-tax profit of €213.6m in Germany. With a Fitch-Rating of AA− (Stable) as part of the HSBC Group, HSBC is the best rated private bank in Germany.

In May 2020 HSBC bought out the second largest shareholder of HSBC Trinkaus & Burkhardt AG, Landesbank Baden-Wuerttemberg (LBBW), who previously owned 18.66% of the company's stock. Now owning 99.33% of the HSBC Trinkaus & Burkhardt AG, HSBC is planning on squeezing out the remaining investors. HSBC Trinkaus & Burkhardt AG is a German Stock Corporation, managed by a five-member Management Board.

Following the acquisition of the minority interest, HSBC consolidated Trinkaus with its French subsidiary, HSBC Continental Europe. It now operates as the Dusseldorf branch of the French business.

== See also ==
- List of banks in Germany
