= Edmond Safra =

Lebanese-Brazilian banker (1932–1999)

- Born: Edmond Jacob Safra; 6 August 1932; Beirut, French Lebanon
- Died: 3 December 1999 (aged 67); Monaco
- Occupation: Banker
- Spouse: Lily Watkins (m. 1976)
- Parent(s): Jacob Safra; Esther Safra
- Relatives: Joseph Safra (brother); Moise Safra (brother)

Edmond Jacob Safra (Arabic: إدموند يعقوب صفرا; 6 August 1932 – 3 December 1999) was a Lebanese-Syrian Brazilian billionaire banker and philanthropist. He continued his family tradition of banking in Brazil and Switzerland, and was married to Lily Watkins from 1976 until his death. He died in a fire that attracted wide media interest, and was judicially determined to be due to arson.

== Early life ==
Edmond Jacob Safra was born on 6 August 1932, in Beirut, Lebanon, his family is of Sephardic Jewish background originally from Aleppo, Syria. His father, Jacob Safra, had opened the J. E. Safra Bank in 1920 in Beirut and in 1929 it became the Banque Jacob E. Safra which in 1956 changed its name to Banque de Credit National S.A.L. (BCN). By the time he was sixteen, Safra was working at his father's bank in Beirut, engaged in the precious metals and foreign exchange aspects of the business.

In 1949, the family moved from Lebanon to Italy, where he worked for a trading company in Milan. When Safra was 16, he earned $40 million during arbitrage transactions between Italian and British gold sovereigns. He used this money to obtain a financial house in Geneva, which became his Trade Development Bank, and used only ancient Arabic script for its bookkeeping. The family moved to Brazil in 1952, where he and his father founded their first Brazilian financial institution in 1955.

== Career ==
In 1956, Safra settled in Geneva to set up a private bank, the Trade Development Bank, which grew from an original US$1 million to US$5 billion during the 1980s. He extended his financial empire to satisfy his wealthy clients from around the world. He also founded the Republic National Bank of New York in 1966, and later, Republic National Bank of New York (Suisse) in Geneva. The Republic Bank operated 80 branches in the New York area, making it the number three branch network in the metropolitan region behind Citigroup and Chase Manhattan.

Safra's banking interests served clients in Monaco, Luxembourg and Switzerland.

From 1980 until Safra's death, Walter Weiner was Safra's attorney, and CEO of Republic National Bank of New York until 1983, when he became its chairman.

The 1983 sale of Trade Development Bank to American Express for more than US$450 million proved contentious. The financier prevailed in a defamation lawsuit, winning a public apology from American Express for starting a smear campaign against him and US$8 million in damages, all of which he donated to charities.

In 1988, he also founded Safra Republic Holdings S.A., a Luxembourg bank holding company.

By the early 1990s, Safra's fortune was estimated at US$2.5 billion.

In 1996 Safra co-founded Hermitage Capital Management with Beny Steinmetz and Bill Browder. The hedge fund became one of the most important investment companies in Russia, and later became famous in connection with the Sergei Magnitsky affair.

On 17 August 1998, Safra's Republic National Bank of New York lost 45% of its net income due to its large holding of Russian bonds after the 1998 Russian financial crisis.

In 1998, Safra's bank alerted the FBI and the Swiss justice about a possible money laundering scheme involving IMF money, the Republic National Bank of New York and the Republic National Bank of New York (Suisse), some other unidentified outlets, and Russian officials of both the Russian Ministry of Finance and the Russian Central Bank. (Note: In July 1998, Vladimir Putin travelled from Moscow to the south of France to conduct important meetings when he was named head of the FSB.) (Note: In 1998, Safra's Republic National Bank of New York was the preferred foreign bank through which most Russian banks had correspondent accounts and both Russian banks, including SBS-Agro (Russian: СБС-Агро), Menatep (Russian: Менатеп), Inkom (Russian: Инком), and United Bank (Russian: Объединенный банк), and the Russian Ministry of Finance transferred IMF loan money to foreign locations through Safra's Republic National Bank of New York.) The IMF funds, which Italian newspaper la Repubblica estimated at $21.4 billion, are said to have caused the 1998 Russian financial crisis. (Note: According to Oleg Lurie, after Boris Berezovsky, who was a Deputy Secretary of the Security Council and the owner of United Bank (Russian: Объединенный банк), a Russian bank involved in the scheme of stealing the IMF funds, tipped off Safra in early autumn 1999 that he would be killed because he had assisted prosecutors, Safra moved from his villa Leopold at Antibes to a very secure bunker in Monaco where he died in December 1999 when two armed masked men entered Safra's 1000 square meter apartment and set fire to it while Safra, his wife, daughter and others in it. Safra succoumbed to smoke inhalation during the blaze. In March 1998, Alexander Litvinenko had been ordered to kill Berezovsky. According to Safra's bodyguards, in the summer of 1999, Safra traveled to Moscow staying for several days during which he met several high-ranking Russian Ministry of Finance officials, Berezovsky, and Roman Abramovich.)

== Later life ==
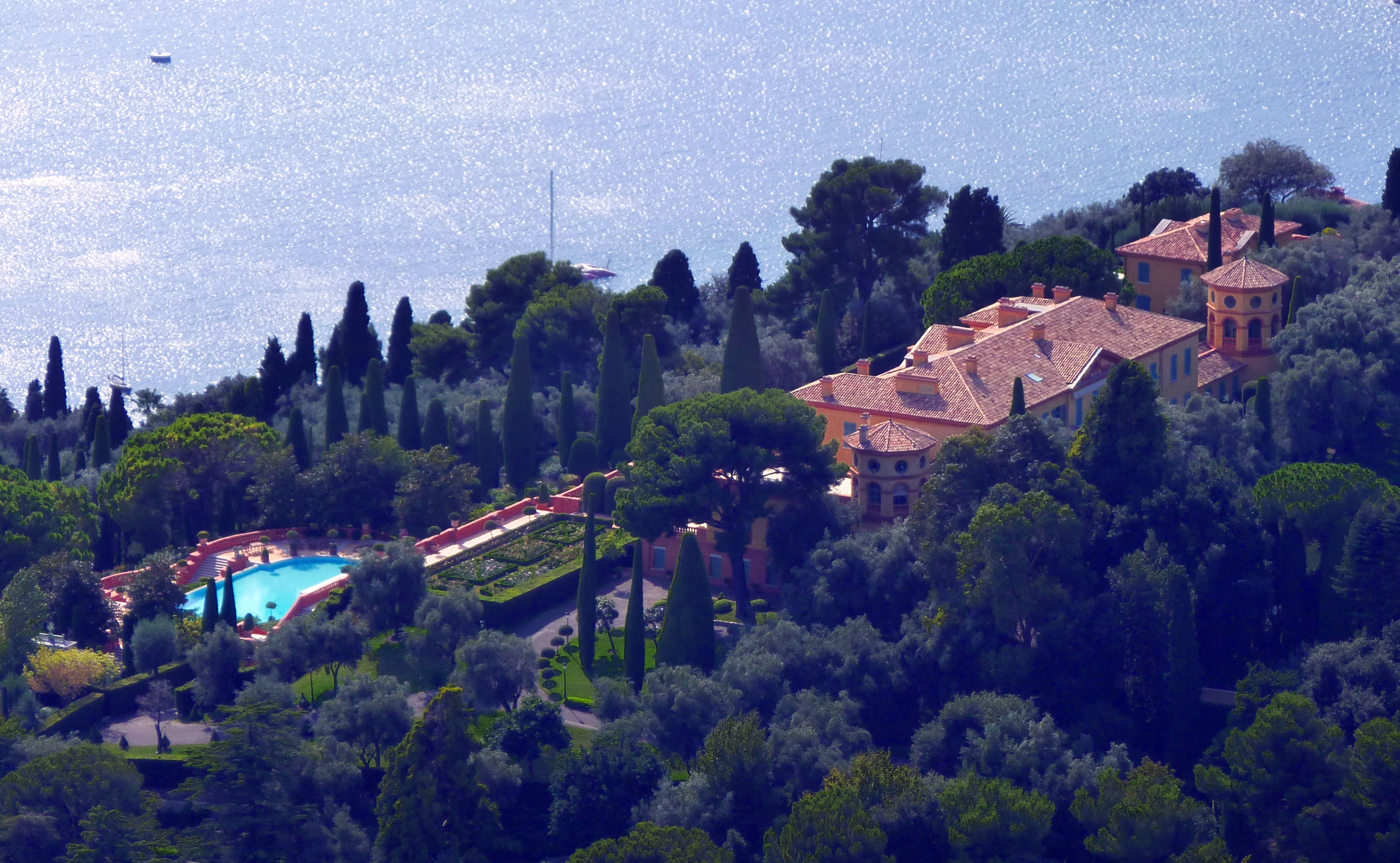
The Villa Leopolda at Villefranche-sur-Mer from the road to La Condamine, one of Safra's residences

As he approached his 60s, Safra divided his time between his homes in Monaco, Geneva, and New York City and the Villa Leopolda on the French Riviera. Weakened by Parkinson's disease, he required nursing care.

In 1999, he sold his Safra Republic Holdings and Republic New York Corporation to HSBC for $10.3 billion in cash. On 31 December 1999, HSBC Private Bank became the new name for Safra's former holdings.

== Personal life ==
In 1976, Safra married Lily Watkins. On 2 December 1999, Edmond and Lily Safra gained Monegasque citizenship.

== Death ==
On 3 December 1999, Safra and nurse Vivian Torrente were suffocated by fumes in a fire deliberately lit at the billionaire's Monaco home, where he apparently felt so safe that he did not have his bodyguards stay the night. On the night of the fire, Daniel Serdet, the attorney general and chief prosecutor of Monaco, stated that Samuel Cohen, Safra's personal security chief, stated that no security guards were needed. Safra's nurse Ted Maher was arrested under suspicion of starting the fire in order to gain attention "through a daring rescue", and then losing control unintentionally. He was convicted of the crime and sentenced to 10 years in prison.

Safra left 50% of his assets to several charities.

== Philanthropy ==
Safra was a major philanthropist during his lifetime, and left his wealth to the Edmond J. Safra Philanthropic Foundation, which supports hundreds of projects in fifty countries around the world in the areas of education, science, medicine, religion, culture and humanitarian assistance.

=== Emergency relief ===
In April 1992, the Assad regime of Syria abolished all travel restrictions on Jews. Safra, whose family had old ties with the city of Aleppo, offered to transfer 4,500 Syrian Jews by plane and financed their settling in Brooklyn.

=== Supporting faith ===
Committed to his faith, Safra believed that constructing and renovating synagogues was important in places where there was a potential for a Jewish community to flourish, and synagogues around the world bearing his father's name testify to this commitment. Many of these were built in the world's major Jewish centers, but he also helped to build synagogues in more remote communities such as Manila and Kinshasa.

Five hundred years after the last synagogue was built in Madrid he constructed a new one. He also helped to renovate and enlarge synagogues in Amsterdam, Istanbul, Naples, Budapest, Rhodes, and Vienna. Safra saved the oldest synagogue in France, in Clermont-Ferrand, from destruction by buying it for the community, and he contributed to the expansion of the Cannes synagogue and Synagogue Beth El in Paris. He also helped refurbish synagogues in many small French cities including Évian, Annemasse, and others. Among the synagogues is the Edmond J. Safra Synagogue in New York City.

In addition to supporting a number of synagogues in Israel, the tombs of Rabbis Meir Baal Haness and Simeon bar Yochai (2nd century CE) were especially important to him, and he was a generous supporter of these pilgrimage sites. For many years on Shavuot eve, the anniversary of his father's death, he would pray at the tomb of Rabbi Meir until dawn.

Many Jewish institutions and programs around the world bear his name.

=== Enhance healthcare and finance medical research ===
During his lifetime, Safra donated millions of dollars to provide treatment for the sick. Hospitals across the globe – the Hôpital Cantonal de Genève, the Hôpitaux de France, and countless institutions in the United States, for example – benefited from his generosity. He was one of the founders of Albert Einstein Hospital in São Paulo, today one of South America's major medical centers. In Israel, he initiated the construction of the Edmond and Lily Safra Children's Hospital at the Tel Hashomer hospital complex.

In the area of medical research, he was a significant supporter of the Institut Pasteur in Paris, the Weizmann Institute in Israel, the Michael J. Fox Foundation for Parkinson's Research and a number of different centers studying specific diseases in France, the United States, and elsewhere around the world. He created the Edmond and Lily Safra Chair in Breast Cancer Research at Tulane University.

In the United States, the Safra Family Lodge hosts families and patients who are having treatment at the National Institutes of Health in Bethesda MD. https://www.cc.nih.gov/familylodge

In France, the Edmond J. Safra Foundation financially supports Clinatec.

=== Education ===
Safra believed higher education was essential for every young person in the modern world, even though he himself never attended university. He provided university scholarship funds for tens of thousands of needy students through the International Sephardic Education Foundation (ISEF), an institution he, his wife, and Nina Avidar Wiener established in 1977 to support deserving Israeli students.

Safra also helped universities directly, often through the support of chairs and particular programs (such as Judaic Studies). For example, at Harvard University he endowed the Jacob E. Safra Professorship of Jewish History and Sephardic Civilization, and the Edmond J. Safra Center for Ethics; and he gave significant funds for the Robert F. Kennedy Visiting Professorship in Latin American Studies. At the University of Pennsylvania's Wharton School of Business, he created the Jacob E. Safra Professorship of International Banking and the Safra Business Research Center.

Safra was awarded Honorary Doctorates by the Hebrew University of Jerusalem and Yeshiva University (New York) (where he established the Jacob E. Safra Institute of Sephardic Studies) for his ongoing support of those institutions.

With respect to younger children's education, Safra was especially devoted to schools in the cities where he lived – for example, he founded Ecole Girsa, Geneva's first and largest Jewish school. He took great pride in founding the Beit Yaacov school in Bat Yam. He was also one of the world's most significant benefactors of yeshivot (religious schools training young men to be rabbis, Jewish teachers, and judges), assisting numerous institutions worldwide.

== Honors ==
- Commandeur de l'Ordre des Arts et Lettres and Chevalier de la Légion d'Honneur by the French government.
- Commander of the Order of Merit of the Grand Duchy of Luxembourg,
- Commander of the Order of Rio Branco by the government of Brazil.

== See also ==
- Edmond & Lily Safra Center for Ethics
- Clinatec
- Grand Théâtre de Genève
- Courtauld Institute of Art
