= Izaak Walton Killam =

Canadian financier (1885–1955)

- Born: July 23, 1885; Yarmouth, Nova Scotia, Canada
- Died: August 5, 1955 (aged 70); Grand-Cascapedia, Quebec, Canada
- Occupations: Financier; Philanthropist
- Spouse: Dorothy Ruth Brooks Johnston (m. 1922)

Izaak Walton Killam (July 23, 1885 – August 5, 1955) was a Canadian financier.

== Early life ==
Born in Yarmouth, Nova Scotia, he was the son of William Dudman Killam and Arabella Hunter (Belle) Cann.

== Business ventures ==
As a young banker with the Union Bank of Halifax, Killam became close friends with John F. Stairs and Max Aitken (Lord Beaverbrook) who put Killam in charge of his Royal Securities. In 1919, Killam bought out Aitken and took full control of the company. His business dealings primarily involved the financing of large pulp and paper and hydro-electric projects throughout Canada and Latin America. One of his larger projects in his native province was the creation of the Mersey Paper Company Ltd. and its related electrical generating stations and shipping fleet.

In 1922, he married Dorothy Ruth Brooks Johnston. Notwithstanding his prodigious financial accomplishments, Killam was a very reserved man who eschewed publicity and was virtually unknown outside a small circle of close acquaintances. In 1927, he acquired The Mail and Empire newspaper and after reorganization it was later sold to the owners of The Globe, who merged it to create The Globe and Mail in 1936.

Killam died in 1955 at his Quebec fishing lodge. By then he was considered to be the richest man in Canada.

== Philanthropy ==
Having no children, the Killams devoted the greater part of their wealth to higher education in Canada. When Killam died the government honoured his request to use his inheritance taxes and a large donation, coupled with those of Sir James H. Dunn, to establish the Canada Council for the Arts (Canada Council).

By the time of Mrs. Killam's death, in 1965, the estate had grown to the point that she was able to bequeath CA$100 million (equivalent to $977 million in 2025) into establishing the Killam Trusts.

The Killam Trusts are allocated to funding scientific research and artistic ventures across Canada, by way of a further endowment to the Canada Council, as well as endowments to five Canadian universities: the University of British Columbia, University of Alberta, University of Calgary, Dalhousie University and McGill University. The endowment to the Canada Council funds the Canada-wide Killam Research Fellowships (established 1967) and Killam Prizes (established 1981), while the five universities use their endowments to fund research, programs and projects at those schools.

Dalhousie University in Halifax benefited the most, having received a $30 million (equivalent to $293 million in 2025) bequest from Dorothy Killam's estate in 1965, representing 32% of her fortune. The 230,000 sq ft (21,000 m^{2}) Killam Memorial Library constructed between 1966 and 1971 at a cost of $7.3 million (equivalent to $68 million in 2025) was designed by architect Leslie R. Fairn and remains an enduring legacy to this day.

Money from the Killam estate also went to establish Izaak Walton Killam Hospital for Children in Halifax and the Montreal Neurological Institute in Montreal.
