= Raymond Corsini =

American psychologist (1914–2008)

Raymond Joseph Corsini (June 1, 1914 – November 8, 2008, Honolulu) was an encyclopedist and lexicographer in the field of psychology.

His works included:

- Corsini, Raymond J. (1966). Role Playing in Psychotherapy. USA: Transaction Publishers.
- Corsini, Raymond J.; Marsella, Anthony J., eds. (1982). Cultural Conceptions of Mental Health and Therapy (Culture, Illness and Healing). USA: D. Reidel Publishing Company.
- Corsini, Raymond J. (2002) The Dictionary of Psychology USA: Brunner-Routledge
