= HSBC Private Bank =

Private banking business of HSBC

HSBC Private Banking Holdings (Suisse) S.A.
- Company type: Division of HSBC Holdings plc
- Industry: Finance
- Headquarters: Geneva, Switzerland
- Key people: Peter Widmer, Chairman; Ida Liu, Chief Executive Officer
- Products: Private banking
- Number of employees: 6,500
- Parent: HSBC
- Website: Official website

HSBC Private Bank is the principal private banking business of the HSBC Group. HSBC Private Bank's holding company is HSBC Private Banking Holdings (Suisse) S.A.. The holding company is wholly owned by British HSBC Bank plc and its subsidiaries include HSBC Private Bank (Suisse) S.A., HSBC Private Bank (UK) Limited, HSBC Private Bank (C.I.) Limited, HSBC Private Bank (Luxembourg) S.A., HSBC Private Bank (Monaco) S.A. and HSBC Financial Services (Cayman) Limited.

HSBC Private Bank, together with the private banking business of HSBC Trinkaus & Burkhardt AG (operating as HSBC Trinkaus) known collectively as Global Private Banking, provides services to wealthy people and their families through 96 offices in some 43 countries and territories in Europe, the Americas, the Asia-Pacific region, the Middle East and Africa. At 31 December 2008, profits before tax were US$1,447 million and combined client assets under management were US$352 billion.

== History ==
HSBC Guyerzeller Bank AG was a subsidiary HSBC Private Bank. In 2009 the HSBC Guyerzeller business was re-branded HSBC Private Bank.

In October 2012, HSBC Private Bank sold Property Vision Holdings Limited to PV Acquisition Limited in a 100% management buyout. Property Vision was acquired by HSBC in 2001 and specialises in managing and providing advice on property purchases. Property Vision's exit from HSBC was part of wider restructuring by the bank, which made 36 disposals of “non-core operating assets” in 2011–2012.

In October 2016, HSBC announced the transfer of the bulk of its private banking business in Monaco to CFM Indosuez Wealth Management. As of October 2016 HSBC's private banking business in Monaco housed US$9bn of customer assets and employed 200 people. Those assets and parts of the business not transferred are to be wound down.

== Controversies ==
=== Riad Salameh money laundering allegations ===
In 2024, the Swiss Financial Market Supervisory Authority (FINMA) found that the bank had seriously breached anti-money laundering obligations in handling accounts linked to two politically exposed persons, widely understood to be former Central Bank of Lebanon governor Riad Salameh and his brother Raja. Between 2002 and 2015, the bank processed nearly $330 million from the Central Bank of Lebanon through an account held by Forry Associates, an offshore company owned by Riad's brother Raja Salameh, despite multiple internal compliance alerts starting in 2006. Court documents revealed that HSBC failed to adequately scrutinize the account’s high turnover and suspicious transactions, only reporting the case to the Money Laundering Reporting Office Switzerland (MROS) in August 2020, after public allegations of corruption surfaced. FINMA barred the bank from onboarding new politically exposed persons until it reviewed existing relationships and clarified management responsibilities. In 2025, Lebanon filed a criminal complaint in Switzerland against HSBC and the Salameh brothers, seeking to expand the investigation and secure compensation.

== See also ==
- Swiss Leaks
- HSBC and Lebanon banking controversy
