= Republic New York =

American bank holding company

- Industry: Banking
- Founded: 1966; 60 years ago
- Founder: Edmond Safra

Republic New York Corporation was the holding company for Republic National Bank of New York, Safra Republic Holdings, and Safra Republic Bank.

The company was controlled by Lebanese billionaire Edmond Safra (1932-1999), who was killed in a fire in his Monte Carlo penthouse apartment, by his American nurse Ted Maher. Republic New York Corporation was sold shortly after its chairman's death to HSBC Bank USA, the US subsidiary of HSBC of the UK.

Joseph Safra, the brother of Edmond Safra, controlled and owned independently the Safra Group of banks and financial institutions.

== History ==
Republic National Bank of New York was founded by Edmond Safra in 1966. Safra had previously opened the Trade Development Bank in Geneva, Switzerland, which acquired a 36% stake in Republic. In 1973, Republic New York Corporation was established as a one-bank holding company for Republic National Bank.

During the mid-1970s, the corporation expanded through a series of acquisitions. In 1974, it acquired Kings Lafayette Bank, which had 18 branches. The following year it acquired American Swiss Credit Company, Ltd., formerly part of Franklin National Bank. In 1977, Republic opened Republic Factors Corporation, and in 1978 it opened Republic International Bank of New York in Miami, Florida.

In 1980, Republic was listed on the New York Stock Exchange and opened Republic International Bank of New York in Los Angeles, California. In 1983, Edmond Safra sold the Trade Development Bank to American Express; several years later, American Express attempted to smear Safra after he attempted to open a competing business. In 1987, the corporation acquired the Williamsburgh Savings Bank, and the following year Edmond Safra organized Safra Holdings S.A. in Geneva, Switzerland, which was 49% owned by Republic.

Further acquisitions followed in the 1990s. In 1990, Republic acquired Manhattan Savings Bank, and in 1992 it established Republic New York Securities Corporation. In 1993, it acquired SafraCorp California, renaming it Republic Bank California N.A., and also acquired Bank Leumi of Canada, Mase Westpac Limited (a member of the London Gold Fixing), and Citibank's World Banknote Services operations. In 1995, Republic acquired Crossland Federal Savings Bank.

In 1999, HSBC acquired Republic New York for US$9.8 billion. In 2001, Republic pleaded guilty to fraud and agreed to restitution of $606 million in connection with cheating Japanese customers by its Republic New York Securities Corporation subsidiary. Their partner at the time, Martin Armstrong, was convicted and spent 11 years in prison.

In 2015, Safra Group purchased Chiquita Brands International. In 2021, HSBC, which had acquired Republic Bank in 1999, announced its intention to exit the retail banking business; the former Republic Bank branches were sold to Citizens Financial Group.

== Safra Republic Holdings ==
=== Thousand year bonds ===
Safra Republic Holdings issued $250 million of 1,000 year bonds in 1997, at a time when there were "a number of 100-year bond issues by corporations."

Safra's banking interests catered to clients looking for tax havens in Switzerland, Luxembourg and Monaco.

== Republic National Bank of New York ==
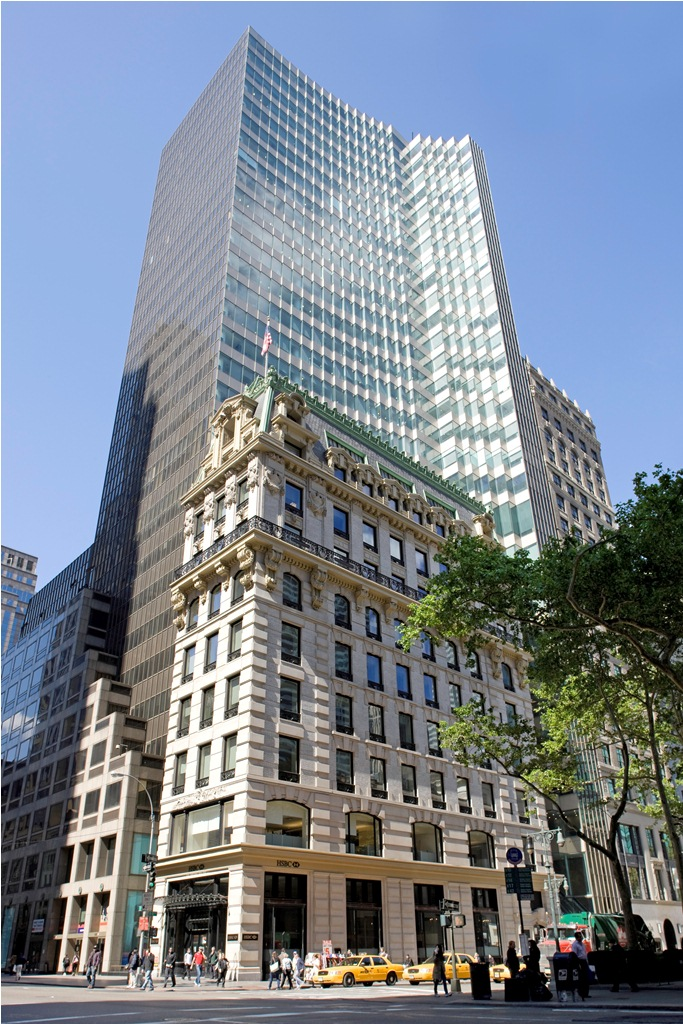
452 Fifth Avenue, formerly Republic National Bank of New York's Fifth Avenue Headquarters

Republic National Bank of New York operated without the "Of New York" part of its full name, even though the name "Republic National Bank of" had at times been used elsewhere.

From 1980 until Safra's death, Walter Weiner was Safra's attorney and CEO of Republic National Bank of New York and, in 1983, Wiener became chairman of the bank.

In 1981, Republic National Bank of New York sought a tax abatement to construct its Fifth Avenue headquarters. The bank was the first midtown project to be turned down since the city's brush with bankruptcy in the mid-1970s. Kenneth Schuman, chairman of the city's Industrial and Commercial Incentive Board, said that the market had become strong enough so that construction would take place without the tax abatement.

In 1998, Safra's Republic National Bank of New York was the preferred foreign bank through which most Russian banks had correspondent accounts. Both Russian banks, including SBS-Agro (Russian: СБС-Агро), Menatep (Russian: Менатеп), Inkom (Russian: Инком), and United Bank (Russian: Объединенный банк), and the Russian Ministry of Finance transferred IMF loan money to foreign locations through Safra's Republic National Bank of New York.

On 17 August 1998, the Republic National Bank of New York lost 45% of its net income due to its large holding of Russian bonds that became worthless after the 1998 Russian financial crisis.

In 1999, Safra sold Safra Republic Holdings and Republic New York Corporation to HSBC for $10.3 billion in cash. The price was reduced to $9.85 billion, after the bank was convicted in a scheme to defraud Japanese investors, and fined over $600 million, in connection with the disgraced market forecaster Martin A. Armstrong.

On 31 December 1999, HSBC Private Bank became the new name for Safra's former holdings.

When Republic was taken over by HSBC Bank USA, which already had acquired the former Marine Midland Bank, the combination retained what Republic had previously achieved: "the third-biggest retail branch network in the New York region." Two competitive parts of their operation were "low-cost checking and free automated teller machine services."
