= Safra =

Safra or SAFRA may refer to:

== People (surname) ==
- Alberto J. Safra (born 1979/1980), Brazilian banker
- Edmond Safra (1932–1999), Syrian-Brazilian banker
- Jacob Safra (1891–1963), Syrian banker
- Jacqui Safra (born 1948), Swiss investor and actor
- Joseph Safra (1939–2020), Brazilian banker
- Lily Safra (1934–2022), Brazilian philanthropist and socialite
- Moise Safra (1934–2014), Brazilian businessman and philanthropist
- Rav Safra (280–338), Babylonian Amora
- Shmuel Safra, Israeli computer scientist
- Vicky Safra (born 1952/1953), Brazilian-born philanthropist

== People (given name) ==
- Safra Catz (born 1961), American business executive

== Organizations ==
- Safra Group, an international network of companies controlled by the Joseph Safra family
  - Banco Safra
  - Bank Jacob Safra Switzerland
  - Safra National Bank of New York
- SAFRA Radio, a Singaporean broadcasting company
- SAFRA National Service Association, Singapore NSmen Recreation Club

== Places ==
- Safra, Iran, a village in Khuzestan Province, Iran
- Safra-ye Moqaddam, a village in Khuzestan Province, Iran
- Safra, Lebanon, a village in Lebanon
- Safra Square, Jerusalem's municipal plaza

== Other uses ==
- Battle of Al-Safra
- Student Aid and Fiscal Responsibility Act
