= Syrian Brazilians =

Sírio-brasileiros البرازيليون السوريون
- (Brazil) (Syria)
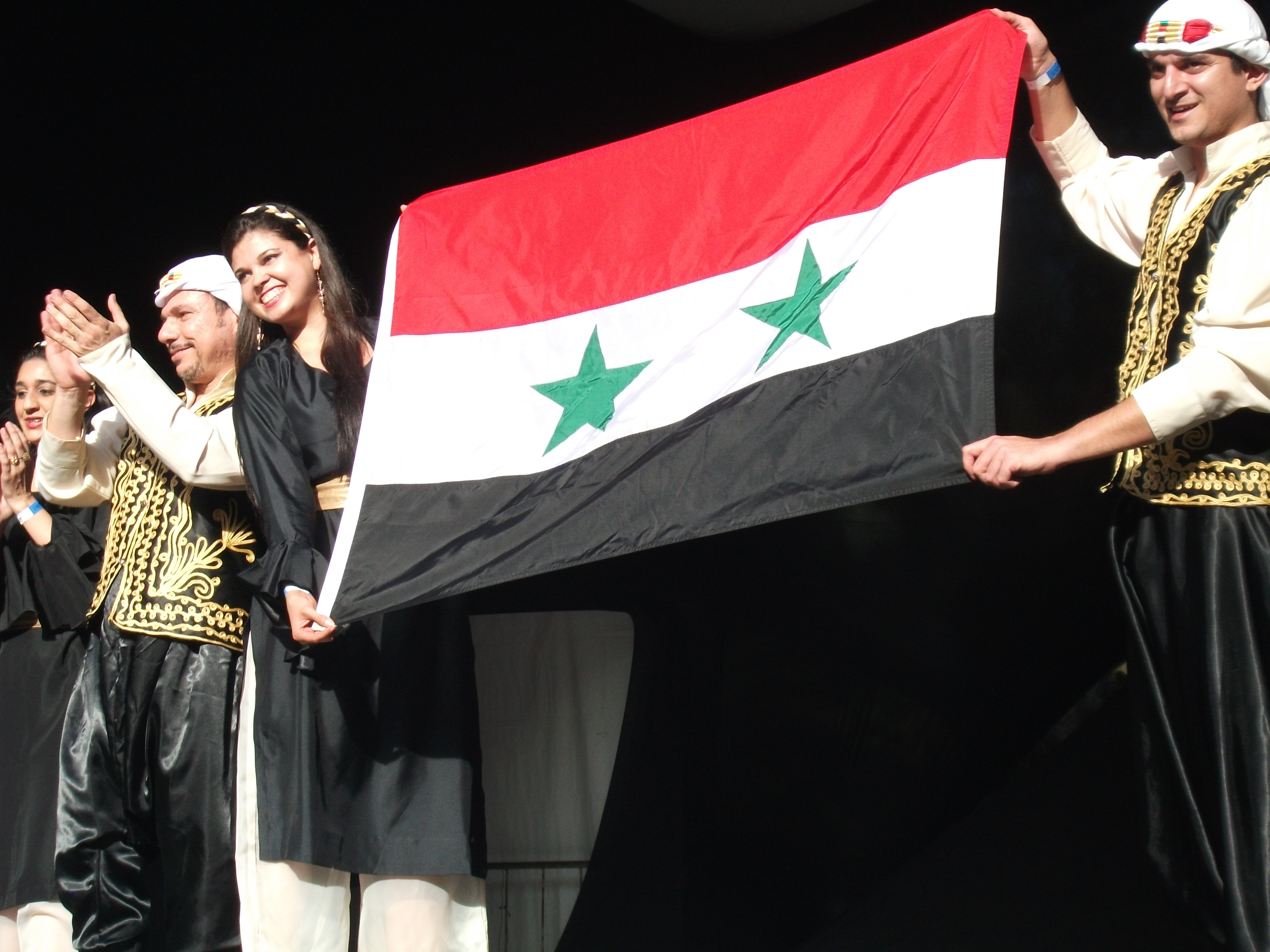
- Syrian Brazilians in São Paulo, displaying then-flag of Ba'athist Syria

Total population
- 3 million

Regions with significant populations
- Brazil (mainly Southeastern Brazil)

Languages
- Brazilian Portuguese, Levantine Arabic

Religion
- Roman Catholicism, Greek Orthodox, minorities of Islam, Judaism.

Related ethnic groups
- Other Asian Brazilians and Arab Brazilians

Syrian Brazilians (Portuguese: Sírio-brasileiros; Arabic: البرازيليون السوريون) are Brazilian citizens of full, partial, or predominantly Syrian ancestry, or Syrian-born immigrants in Brazil.

== History ==
Syrians have immigrated to Brazil from the Ottoman Empire beginning in the 19th century, the population of Brazil of either full or partial Syrian descent is estimated by the Brazilian government to be around 3 or 4 million people. Syrians, along with Lebanese and East Asian descendants, make up the majority of the Asian Brazilian community in the country. According to research conducted by IBGE in 2008, 0.9% of White Brazilian respondents said they had familial origins from the Middle East, which equals less than 1 million people. They are mostly of Lebanese and Syrian descent.

== Notable people ==
- Joseph Safra, banker who was Brazil’s richest man and the richest banker in the world.
- Moise Safra, billionaire businessman; co-founder of Banco Safra.
- Edmond Safra, billionaire banker.
- Alberto J. Safra, billionaire businessman.
- Eli Horn, billionaire businessman; founder of Cyrela Brazil Realty, the largest homebuilder and real estate company by revenue and market value in Brazil.
- João Saad, founder of Grupo Bandeirantes de Comunicação, one of the largest media conglomerates in Latin America, which owns Band, the fourth largest Brazilian television network.
- Alexandre Kalil, politician; he served as mayor of Belo Horizonte, and as president of the football club Clube Atlético Mineiro.
- Sasson Dayan, billionaire banker, co-founder of Daycoval.
- Romeu Tuma, former director of the Federal Police of Brazil.
- Tirone E. David, cardiac surgeon, known for his 2007 development of the "David Operation."

== See also ==
- Immigration to Brazil
- Lebanese Brazilians
