= Safra family =

Family

The Safra family is a prominent Brazilian family of Syrian Jewish descent. The Safras were bankers and gold traders originally from Aleppo.

== History ==
During the time of the Ottoman Empire they were engaged in the financing of caravan trade between Beirut, Aleppo, Istanbul and Alexandria.

In 1914, Jacob Safra settled in Beirut, and he opened his first Bank, Banque Jacob E. Safra, in 1920. It quickly prospered, benefiting from a massive influx of Syrian businessmen and merchants who became Jacob's customer base.

=== Presence in Europe ===
The Safra family maintains a significant presence in Europe primarily through their ownership of J. Safra Sarasin Group, a leading Swiss private bank headquartered in Basel, Switzerland. The bank was formed after the Safra family's acquisition of Bank Sarasin in 2011 from Rabobank, merging it with their existing Swiss operations under Banco Safra (Switzerland). This strategic move strengthened the family's position in European private banking, with J. Safra Sarasin operating across major financial hubs such as Geneva, Zurich, Luxembourg, London, and Monaco.

As of 2025, J. Safra Sarasin manages over CHF 200 billion in assets, making it one of the largest privately owned banks in Switzerland and an important player in the European wealth management landscape.

The Safra family also has real estate investments in Europe, notably including The Gherkin (30 St Mary Axe) in London, acquired by Safra Group in 2014.

== Family tree ==
- Jacob Safra (1889–1963), married to Esther Teira (1904–1943), 9 children
  - Elie Safra (1922–1993), married to Yvette Dabbah (1927–2006), 4 children
    - Jacqui Safra (1947–), partner of Jean Doumanian (1939–)
    - Diane Safra
    - Stela Safra
    - Patricia Safra
  - Paulette Safra (1924–1937)
  - Eveline Safra (1925–1997), married Rahmo Nasser (?—2003), 4 children
    - Ezequiel Nasser
  - Edmond Safra (1932–1999), married Lily Watkins, no children
  - Arlette Safra (1933–), married David Hazan, 8 children
  - Moise Safra (1934–2014), married Chella Cohen, 5 children
    - Jacob Safra
    - Ezra Safra
    - Esther Safra, married to Claudio Szajman, son of Abram Szajman
    - Edmond Safra, married to Marielle Nahmad, daughter of David Nahmad and sister of Helly Nahmad and Joe Nahmad
    - Olga Safra
  - Hugette Safra (1935–2023), married Ralph Michaan, 6 children
  - Gaby Safra (1937–2022), married to her cousin Elliot Safra (1920–2003), 2 children
  - Joseph Safra (1938–2020), married Vicky Sarfaty, 4 children
    - Alberto J. Safra (1979/1980–), married to Maggy Candi, 4 children
    - Jacob J. Safra
    - Esther Safra Dayan, married to Carlos Dayan, son of Sasson Dayan
    - David J. Safra
    - Victor Safra
