= Reactions to Executive Order 13769 =

Responses to 2017 order by US President Donald Trump

Many organizations reacted to the enactment of Executive Order 13769, titled "Protecting the Nation from Foreign Terrorist Entry into the United States", which was an executive order issued by United States President Donald Trump. Domestically, the order was criticized by Democratic and Republican members of Congress, universities, business leaders, major corporations, Catholic bishops, and Jewish organizations. Some 1,000 U.S. diplomats signed a dissent cable opposing the order, setting a record. Public opinion was divided, with initial national polls yielding inconsistent results. Protests against the order erupted in airports and cities.

Internationally, the order prompted broad condemnation, including from longstanding U.S. allies, although some leaders expressed support for it. The travel ban and suspension of refugee admissions was criticized by top United Nations officials and by a group of 40 Nobel laureates and thousands of other academics. Dozens of medical and scientific groups protested the order as well.

== Official statements ==
Donald Trump's speech just after signing the executive order on January 28, 2017, indicated its purpose was to keep "radical Islamic terrorists" from the U.S. and invoked the September 11 attacks. On January 29, 2017, Trump issued an official statement clarifying his stance on the executive order. Trump said that his policy is "similar to what President Obama did in 2011 when he banned visas for refugees from Iraq for six months" and stated that the executive order did not target religion, stating "there are over 40 different countries worldwide that are majority Muslim that are not affected by this order". Trump concluded, "I have tremendous feeling for the people involved in this horrific humanitarian crisis in Syria." Glenn Kessler of The Washington Post stated that Obama limited immigration for six months, but continued to admit refugees during all six months and did not ban all citizens (including green card holders) from traveling to the United States, although lawful permanent residents have since been exempted from Trump's executive order. Jonathan Chait of New York magazine said that the 2011 case involved a temporary response to specific intelligence regarding two suspicious Iraqi refugees living in Bowling Green, Kentucky and said that Trump's "sweeping halt in the absence of a reported breach" is not comparable.

The statement also said that the order applied to countries "previously identified by the Obama administration as sources of terror". The Trump administration's executive order relied on H.R.158 or the Visa Waiver Program Improvement and Terrorist Travel Prevention Act of 2015, which was passed by congress and signed into law by President Obama. The act, which was part of a necessary spending bill, the Consolidated Appropriations Act, 2016, removed the privilege of 90-day visa-free entry of dual nationals of 38 visa-waiver countries who had traveled to specific countries since 2011. Instead, these travelers could enter with a visa. These countries are Iraq, Syria, and countries on the State Sponsors of Terrorism list (Iran and Sudan), with Libya, Yemen, and Somalia added later by the Secretary of Homeland Security.

On January 30, White House press secretary, Sean Spicer, used the Quebec City mosque shooting as an illustration of the need for anti-terror policies saying, "It's a terrible reminder of why we must remain vigilant, and why the president is taking steps to be proactive, rather than reactive, when it comes to our nation's safety and security." However, as the Toronto Star pointed out, it was strange to use this example since the accused gunman was not a Muslim. The Independent in the UK also reported that Spicer's comments seemed to use the attack as a justification for the US president's own anti-terror policies but did not specify which policies he was referring to.

Spicer held a press briefing on January 31 where he said that it was incorrect to refer to the executive order as a "travel ban" and that only the media was using those words to describe the order. When pointed out by an NBC reporter that Trump himself used the word in his personal Twitter account, Spicer responded that it was because the media is using it. He also confronted the reporter that NBC news was part of the confusion for falsely reporting that Secretary of Homeland Security John Kelly had not been properly consulted before the executive order was signed.

On February 2, Kellyanne Conway cited a non-existent event, the Bowling Green massacre, during an interview with MSNBC's Chris Matthews as a reason to ban refugees. The Bowling Green massacre, according to Conway, took place when two Iraqi terrorists pretending to be refugees caused a "massacre." The event that Conway was intending to cite was the arrest of two Iraqi men in Bowling Green, Kentucky who were charged with federal terrorism for attempting to send money and weapons to Al Qaeda in Iraq. Conway apologized for her mistake.

=== Trump Twitter and Facebook posts ===
Trump has also defended his executive order through Twitter. On January 29, he tweeted: "Our country needs strong borders and extreme vetting, NOW. Look what is happening all over Europe and, indeed, the world – a horrible mess!" On Monday, he continued to tweet, where he "de-emphasized the number of travelers affected by the hasty implementation of the travel ban", according to Business Insider. It was also written in The Washington Post that his tweets were intended to minimize the impact the executive order had on travelers. In several other tweets on Monday, he blamed travel delays on a Delta Air Lines computer outage, "protesters and the tears of Senator Schumer". The computer outage Trump referred to actually occurred on Sunday January 29, two days after the order was signed. Trump defended the executive order on Twitter, stating that searching for terrorists is not about being "nice" and that "[i]f the ban were announced with a one week notice, the 'bad' would rush into our country during that week. A lot of bad 'dudes' out there!" On February 1, Trump tweeted, "Everybody is arguing whether or not it is a BAN. Call it what you want, it is about keeping bad people (with bad intentions) out of country!" On February 4, in response to James Robart's block of the Executive Order, Trump tweeted "What is our country coming to when a judge can halt a Homeland Security travel ban and anyone, even with bad intentions, can come into U.S.?" and later "Because the ban was lifted by a judge, many very bad and dangerous people may be pouring into our country. A terrible decision".

On February 5, President Trump shared a fake news story on his Facebook page, claiming that Kuwait also imposed a similar ban on immigrants from several Muslim countries, supposedly inspired by Trump's executive order. The comment attached to the shared story was "Smart!", and in the next 24 hours it received 250,000 likes and over 68,000 shares. After the story was picked up by the far right outlet Breitbart News, whose former executive chairman is Trump's advisor Steve Bannon, by the Russian propaganda outlet Sputnik News, and the fringe conspiracy website InfoWars, the government of Kuwait issued a statement "categorically denying" the existence of such a ban and stated that immigrants from the supposedly restricted countries "enjoy full rights" in Kuwait.

On February 8, after Trump's executive order was upheld at the United States Court of Appeals for the Ninth Circuit, Trump angrily tweeted "SEE YOU IN COURT, THE SECURITY OF OUR NATION IS AT STAKE!" Trump also told his press poll "it's a political decision and we'll see them in court...it is a decision that we will win in my opinion very easily." Trump described the decision as "disgraceful" in a tweet and quoted one line of an article by Benjamin Wittes (a Senior Fellow of the Brookings Institution), "Remarkably, in the entire [9th Circuit panel's] opinion, the panel did not bother even to cite this (the) (Note: 8 U.S.C. § 1182(f)) statute." Wittes' article, however, supported the Ninth Circuit's decision. Trump's tweet came just minutes after the Wittes' article at Lawfare had been discussed on MSNBC's Morning Joe. The following day Wittes described as "disturbing" that Trump would cite something "with apparently no idea who the author was or what the publication was, and indeed without reading the rest of the article."

== Domestic political reaction ==
Trump on refugee/immigration order: "It's not a Muslim ban" (video from Voice of America)

Trump faced much criticism for the executive order. Democrats "were nearly united in their condemnation" of the policy, with Senate Minority Leader Chuck Schumer saying that "tears are running down the cheeks of the Statue of Liberty tonight as a grand tradition of America, welcoming immigrants, that has existed since America was founded, has been stomped upon". Senator Bernie Sanders of Vermont said the order "plays into the hands of fanatics wishing to harm America". Senator Kamala Harris of California and the Council on American–Islamic Relations denounced the order and called it a Muslim ban. Trump's order was also criticized by former U.S. Secretaries of State Madeleine Albright and Hillary Clinton. Kevin Lewis, spokesperson to Trump's predecessor Barack Obama, also said (in apparent reference to the order) that the ex-president "fundamentally disagrees" with religious discrimination. SCOTUS judge Sonia Sotomayor wrote a dissent detailing the racially motivated bias she believes to be at play in the formation of this play, concluding that it was driven by "anti-Muslim animus, rather than by the Government's asserted national-security justifications".

Among Republicans, some praised the order, with Speaker of the House Paul Ryan saying that Trump was "right to make sure we are doing everything possible to know exactly who is entering our country" while noting that he supported the refugee resettlement program. Alabama governor Robert Bentley also supported the order. Republican Congressman Bob Goodlatte said that he was "pleased that President Trump is using the tools granted to him by Congress and the power granted by the Constitution to help keep America safe and ensure we know who is entering the United States". However, some top Republicans in Congress criticized the order. In a statement, Senators John McCain and Lindsey Graham cited the confusion that the order caused and the fact that the "order went into effect with little to no consultation with the Departments of State, Defense, Justice, and Homeland Security". McCain stated that the order would "probably, in some areas, give ISIS some more propaganda". Senator Susan Collins, who announced in August 2016 that she would not vote for Trump because she felt he was "unsuitable for office", also objected to the ban, calling it "overly broad" and saying that "implementing it will be immediately problematic". Several other Republican senators offered more muted criticism. In response to McCain and Graham's statement, Trump criticized them on Twitter January 29, questioning their stance on immigration and saying that they "should focus their energies on ISIS, illegal immigration and border security instead of always looking to start World War III".

Sixteen Democratic state attorneys general signed a joint statement condemning the order as unconstitutional, including those in California, Pennsylvania and New York. The statement said they intended to "use all of the tools of our offices to fight this unconstitutional order". Virginia Governor Terry McAuliffe and New York Governor Andrew Cuomo both pledged to have their states look into how they could aid refugees in state airports.

Critics described the order as a "Muslim ban" for targeting Muslim-majority countries and prioritizing minority-religion refugees. President Trump, however, stated that, "this is not a Muslim ban, as the media is falsely reporting", while Rudy Giuliani, who said he helped write the order, called it a legal alternative to a religious ban targeting Muslims.

The Supreme Court later upheld the Ban, to which Trump responded "The Supreme Court has upheld the clear authority of the President to defend the national security of the United States."

=== Protests and impact on airports ===
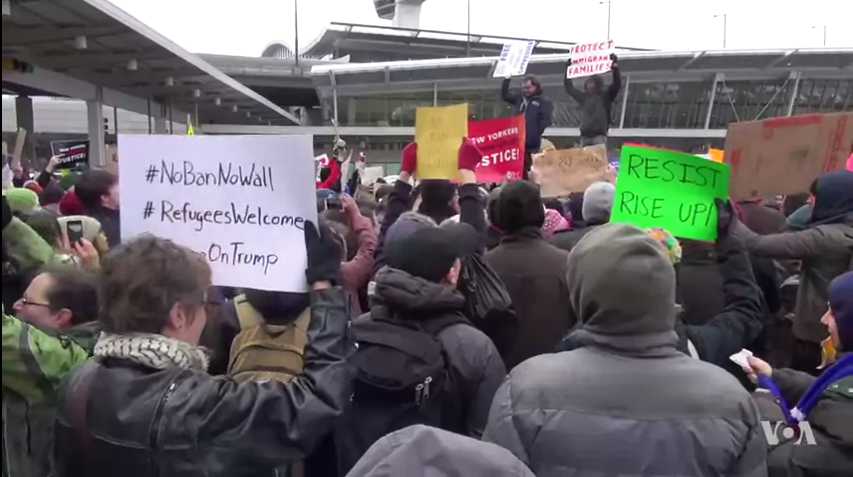
Protests against the order at New York's John F. Kennedy International Airport

Trump immigration order sparks protests at New York's airport (report from Voice of America)

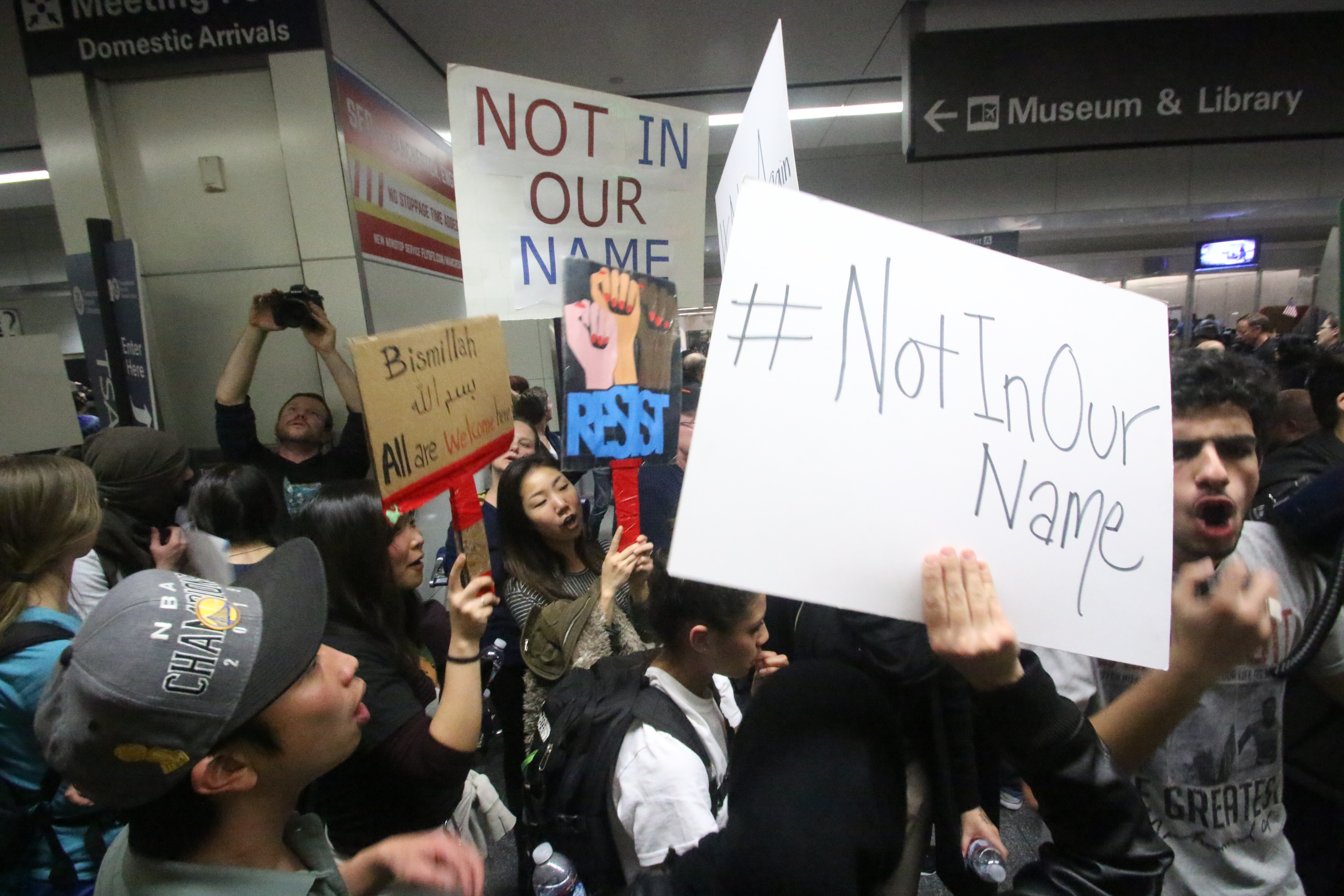
Protests against the order at San Francisco International Airport on January 29, 2017

On January 28 and thereafter, thousands of protesters gathered at airports and other locations throughout the United States to protest the signing of the order and detention of the foreign nationals.

- Albany International Airport – there were no reports of detentions of travelers in Albany
- Albuquerque International Sunport – receives domestic flights only
- Atlanta, Hartsfield–Jackson Atlanta International Airport – 11 people were detained at the Atlanta airport before a federal judge blocked part of the order from being implemented; the confusion and chaos following the order also "placed in limbo 40 Atlanta-bound refugees who were already in transit when Trump signed the order."
- Boston, Logan International Airport – two University of Massachusetts Dartmouth engineering professors—Iranian nationals who are lawful permanent residents of the United States—were detained at the airport before being released hours later. The professors brought a legal action that led to a Boston federal judge placing a hold on deportations.
- Chicago, O'Hare International Airport – The executive order caused a chaotic day at O'Hare's international terminal, where 18 travelers were detained the day following the executive order's issuance. All were released by the end of the evening. A crowd of thousands protested; no arrests were made.
- College Station, Texas – Easterwood Airport – Texas A&M University Campus Airport
- Columbus, Ohio John Glenn Columbus International Airport
- Dallas/Fort Worth International Airport – some two dozen people were reported to have been detained for a time under the order. An Iraqi man in a wheelchair traveling on a special immigrant visa was released after 15 hours of detention; volunteer lawyers who filed an emergency writ on the man's behalf said that he had been targeted for attack in Iraq because he worked for U.S. military.
- Denver International Airport – a handful of travelers were detained and then released at Denver's airport, including two married surgeons from Iran who were returning home. A peaceful three-hour demonstration at the airport ended after a federal judge blocked enforcement of the order.
- Detroit Metropolitan Airport
- Honolulu International Airport
- Houston, George Bush Intercontinental Airport
- Indianapolis International Airport – several hundred protesters gathered just inside the entrance to the airport. Speakers included Senator Joe Donnelly (D-IN), Representative André Carson (D-IN), and community faith leaders.
- Los Angeles International Airport the process was shrouded in secrecy at the Los Angeles International Airport; officials refused to release statistics on the number of people deported or the number of people detained and for how long.
- Miami International Airport
- Minneapolis–Saint Paul International Airport
- New York City, John F. Kennedy International Airport
- Newark Liberty International Airport
- Philadelphia International Airport – several travelers were detained at the airport before a federal judge ruled upon the issue; two Christian Syrian immigrant families who were detained at the Philadelphia airport were sent back to Doha, Qatar. About 200 people participated in a protest at the airport; Governor Tom Wolf and Mayor Jim Kenney participated.
- Portland International Airport
- Salt Lake City International Airport – "While immigrants were detained at airports elsewhere in the country, there was no indication that had occurred in Salt Lake City. The U.S. Department of Homeland Security, which was fielding calls from reporters, did not answer several phone calls Saturday from The Salt Lake Tribune." Several hundred people gathered at the airport to demonstrate opposition to the executive order and show support for the Utah refugee community.
- Sacramento International Airport – a large crowd at the Sacramento airport denounced the executive order; there were no reported detentions in Sacramento.
- San Angelo Regional Airport
- San Antonio International Airport
- San Diego International Airport – More than 1,000 demonstrators, many bearing the American flag, protested at the airport over two days in opposition to the executive order. San Diego airport officials said there had been no detentions under the order at the airport.
- San Francisco International Airport – A diverse crowd of more than 1,000 demonstrators demonstrated at the San Francisco International Airport. On January 29, airport officials said that five people had been detained under the executive order and later released.
- Seattle–Tacoma International Airport
- Washington Dulles International Airport

Members of the United States Congress, including Senator Elizabeth Warren (D-MA) and Congressman John Lewis (D-GA) joined the protests in their own home states. Google co-founder Sergey Brin and Y Combinator president Sam Altman joined the protest at San Francisco airport. Virginia governor, Terry McAuliffe, joined the protest at Dulles International Airport on Saturday.

In response to protests, the airport operators of John F. Kennedy International Airport in New York and Seattle–Tacoma International Airport shut down transit access to the airport (AirTrain JFK and the SeaTac/Airport light rail station, respectively). New York Governor Andrew Cuomo ordered that AirTrain service resume, while Sound Transit ordered the resumption of light rail service in Seattle.

=== U.S. diplomats ===
The "dissent cable" memo

More than nine hundred United States diplomats in the State Department created a memo or "dissent cable" outlining their disagreement with the order. The memo was sent through the "Dissent Channel" which was put into place in 1971, originally to allow senior leadership in the State Department to have access to differing viewpoints on the Vietnam War. On Monday, January 30, White House Press Secretary Sean Spicer told dissenting diplomats to leave their jobs if they do not agree with the Trump administration by saying "They should either get with the program or they can go", despite the rules protecting dissenters in the State Department.

== Social media reactions and celebrity influencers ==
Following Trump's announcement of the order, the topic began to trend on social media platform Twitter. The first hashtag emerged from, Zaki Barzinji, who worked under the Obama administration as Senior Associate Director of Public Engagement and worked as a liaison to Muslim American communities of faith. He tweeted a night before President Trump officially released the order to the public on January 25, 2017. Shortly after, hashtags such as #MuslimBan, #TravelBan, #NoBanNoWall, and #BanTrumpFromUK emerged on other social media sites. In June 2017, terrorist attacks on London Bridge occurred. Donald Trump used the opportunity to prove the effectiveness of the Travel ban policy, tweeting "We need the Travel Ban as an extra level of safety!". London Mayor Sadiq Khan, among many others, denounced his response to the attack. As a response to his tweets and the Executive Order, online protests used the hashtag #BanTrumpFromUK proceeding his state visit. Protests urging for the cancellation of Trump's UK visit garnered up to 1.5 million signatures.

Facebook in particular was used as a means to mobilize those that were interacting with the movement online to a physical location by means of Facebook event pages. This allowed hundreds of thousands of users to come together at different locations and protest Trump's executive order. As individuals were detained at airports, broadcasts of these detentions on news networks strike panic amongst affected communities, particularly Muslim and immigrant communities. Emotional responses were evoked from many across social media in the forms of hashtags that engaged citizens to stand in solidarity with those families affected by the ban.

An Instagram post that garnered a lot of attention was an illustration by Jamie Hu. The illustration shows the American Statue of Liberty hugging what is shown to be as an immigrant woman. Music group Fifth Harmony's member Lauren Jauregui shared the picture on their Instagram timeline in solidarity with those being affected by Donald Trump's policy, and this garnered the illustration much popularity.

Celebrities voiced their opinions on the executive order on social media platforms, such as Facebook and Twitter. Reality star, Kim Kardashian, tweeted "statistics" with an image titled "Number of Americans killed annually by", followed by statistics that denounced the order. Actor Seth Rogan tweeted "Saskatchewan has offered to take in refugees stranded due to the #MuslimBan. I've been there and it's nice." Pakistani activist, Malala Yousafzai, shared a statement on Facebook, stating that she was "heartbroken that America is turning its back on a proud history of welcoming refugees and immigrants." Kerry Washington tweeted, "stick to my stomach today about the #MuslimBan."

Murad Awawdeh also had a hand in influencing the popularity of the hashtag #NoBanNoWall. Awawdeh was the New York Immigration Coalition Director and made one of the most widely circulated tweets shortly after the announcement of Donald Trump's executive order. He tweeted, "TAKE ACTION: #NYC head to #JFK #T4 arrivals for a rapid response protest NOW! #NoBanNoWall #MuslimBan #Resist." This tweet got thousands of retweets and embarked one of the first floods of people into JFK airport for the first physical protest against Executive Order 13769.

Other media responses included a short film by Washington post writer Jason Rezaian, which highlighted the separation of spouses due to the ban.

== United Nations and human rights groups ==
United Nations Secretary General António Guterres said that the travel bans "indeed violate our basic principles. And I think that they are not effective if the objective is to really avoid terrorists to enter the United States." United Nations High Commissioner for Human Rights Zeid Ra'ad al Hussein denounced the travel ban, writing that "wastes resources needed for proper counter-terrorism" and is illegal under international human rights law.

In a joint statement, the Office of the United Nations High Commissioner for Refugees and the International Organization for Migration urged the new Trump administration to follow "the longstanding U.S. policy of welcoming refugees", stating: "We strongly believe that refugees should receive equal treatment for protection and assistance, and opportunities for resettlement, regardless of their religion, nationality or race."

The travel ban was condemned by Amnesty International, which vowed to fight it; the director of Amnesty International USA termed the executive order "dangerous", while the director of Amnesty International UK said that it was "shocking and appalling" and feared that the ban become permanent. Human Rights Watch similarly condemned the measure, saying that "The decision to drastically curtail the refugee program will abandon tens of thousands to the risk of persecution or worse and cede American leadership on a vitally important issue" and would not make the U.S. safer.

The International Rescue Committee condemned the executive order; its president, David Miliband, said that the executive order presented "a test for the Western world ... of whether or not we hold fast to the values of non-discrimination and to universal values of freedom from persecution." Miliband also called it "a propaganda gift for all those who would do harm to the United States."

The Inter-American Commission on Human Rights held a thematic session reviewing the executive order on March 21, 2017, where representatives of the American Civil Liberties Union and the American-Arab Anti-Discrimination Committee spoke on the ban. Breaking with past practice, the US government failed to send any representatives to the hearing.

== Scholars and experts ==
Fifty-one Nobel Prize laureates, along with thousands of other scholars, including Fields Medal winners, John Bates Clark Medal recipients, and National Academy of Sciences members, signed a petition condemning the order, stating that the order compels the "unethical and discriminatory treatment of law-abiding, hard-working, and well-integrated immigrants fundamentally contravenes the founding principles of the United States" and was detrimental to the national interest. Nobel Peace Prize laureate Malala Yousafzai also condemned the executive order.

The Wall Street Journal editorial board blasted Trump's executive order as "blunderbuss and broad". The New York Times labeled the executive order as "cruel, bigoted, cowardly, and self-defeating", calling it a "blatantly unconstitutional" and "un-American" decision that exacerbated "injury and suffering ... on families that had every reason to believe they had outrun carnage and despotism in their homelands to arrive in a singularly hopeful nation". The Sacramento Bee condemned the order as "sickening, draconian, disgraceful, and wrong on every level, to the point of incompetence". The Boston Globe described the act as "shameful" and "offensive", saying that it not only fails to protect Americans but also "hands a propaganda victory to ISIS, appearing to vindicate the claim that the United States is out to get Muslims".

Michael Hayden, who served presidents Clinton, Bush, and Obama in high-level intelligence positions, including NSA director and CIA director, said of the executive order:

It's a horrible move. It is a political, ideological move driven by the language of the [Trump] campaign and ... promises in the campaign that were hyped by an exaggeration of the threat, and in fact what [the U.S. is] doing now has probably made us less safe today than we were Friday morning before th[e executive order] happened. Because we are now living the worst jihadist narrative possible: that there is undying enmity between Islam and the West. Muslims out there who were not part of the jihadist movement are now being shown that the story they were being told by the jihadists—"They hate us, they're our enemy"—that's being acted out by the American government. And frankly, at a humanitarian level, it's an abomination.

=== Academic and scientific community ===
Over 6,000 college and university professors signed a national petition during the weekend of January 28 denouncing the executive order. A letter denouncing the immigration ban has by February 1, collected more than 18,000 signatures from academics. Leaders in a large number of colleges and universities issued statements against the immigration ban. Academics criticized the executive order because of the disruption in education it caused some students, because of the confusion in its implication and in "many cases, expressed moral outrage." The Association of American Universities has called for the immigration ban to end "as quickly as possible." Johns Hopkins University has asked students and faculty to avoid traveling outside of the United States. More than 4,500 International academics have pledged to boycott conferences based in the U.S.

Scientists doing work in the United States who are from the targeted countries have been affected as well, stranding some scientists in other countries or away from loved ones and their research. Nature interviewed more than 20 researchers and scientists who have been affected. Some scientists in other countries have "vowed to stop reviewing scientific articles in US-based journals as a way to oppose the policy."

According to experts, Trump's order "is unlikely to significantly reduce the terrorist threat in the United States", and "many experts believe the order's unintended consequences will make the threat worse". Professor Charles Kurzman of the University of North Carolina said that since the September 11 attacks in 2001, "no one has been killed in the United States in a terrorist attack by anyone who emigrated from or whose parents emigrated from" the seven countries targeted by the order. Some experts also said that "there was a random quality" in the selection of countries affected by the order; for example, Saudi Arabia and Egypt were not listed although many jihadist groups were established there, and Pakistan and Afghanistan were also not listed despite longstanding histories of extremism in those countries; while others, including two former White House chief ethics lawyers, found a possible correlation between exclusions from the order and the Trump Organization's business interests.

Professor Juan Cole of the University of Michigan said that six of the seven countries named in the order (with the exception of Yemen) were suggested as targets for regime change in an alleged classified paper produced by the Office of the Secretary of Defense in the autumn of 2001 following 9/11. The allegation was made by former General Wesley Clark in his 2007 memoir A Time to Lead. Cole suggested that "the actual situation is the opposite from the one advertised by Trump. These are not countries that pose a danger to the U.S. They are countries to which the U.S poses the risk, of instability and millions of displaced".

Regarding the legality of the order, Peter Spiro indicated in an interview that there's a possibility that even if the courts accept the plenary power of the president, they will strike down the executive order on an equal protection basis. Although the Trump administration argues that the executive order serves some kind of counterterrorism purpose, the courts, according to Spiro, will see this argument as irrational. He cites the "more than a thousand foreign service officers" that say that the order does "not advance any counter-terror objective [and that] it actually detracts from national security values." Furthermore, the heartbreaking human stories of immigrants and refugees affected by the order will play a role in the courts' rulings. In the same interview, Anil Kalhan of the Thomas R. Kline School of Law agreed with Spiro's reasoning and added, "It is so clear that the order was not appropriately vetted within the executive branch before it was issued, and I think that will offend judicial sensibilities." Kalhan also said that he thinks that the protests against the order may convince the courts that they are acting in concert with public support and will therefore not have to worry about risking the court's legitimacy by not deferring to the executive branch. Both Spiro and Kalhan view the executive order as unconstitutional.

The executive order left American colleges and universities scrambling amidst confusion over the full scope and extent of the order. Several universities, including Johns Hopkins University, the University of Virginia and George Washington University, told affected students and faculty members affected to avoid traveling abroad because of fears that they would be barred from reentering the country. The Association of American Universities's associate vice president for federal relations said that the ban was "very, very disruptive", particularly to graduate students engaging in research. University presidents and other higher education leaders "said the order could ultimately hurt the country's competitiveness if the best and brightest research scholars no longer want to study or work in the United States", weakening American preeminence in higher education.

Many academics were barred entry and unable to present their work: Iranian neuroscientist Leila Akbari was barred from attending the Society for Neuroscience's annual conference and presenting her research, neurophysiologist Matthew Leavitt tweeted that his Iranian labmate was unable to attend the conference as well.

=== Think tanks ===
Benjamin Wittes of the Brookings Institution described the order as "malevolence tempered by incompetence", saying that it "will cause hardship and misery for tens or hundreds of thousands of people because that is precisely what it is intended to do". Law professor and libertarian blogger Ilya Somin termed the order "cruel and counterproductive", saying "It inflicts great harm on many thousands of people while simultaneously endangering national security". Jonathan H. Adler declared that "the degree of administrative incompetence in [the order's] execution is jaw-dropping", criticizing "the cavalier and reckless manner in which this specific EO was developed and implemented".

In a 2016 risk analysis paper by Alex Nowrasteh for the Cato Institute, Nowrasteh states, "the chance of an American being murdered in a terrorist attack caused by a refugee is 1 in 3.64 billion per year". Citing Nowrasteh's paper, The Economist said this makes death by cows, fireworks and malfunctioning elevators much likelier and described Trump's order as "almost worthless".

== International reactions ==
The order prompted broad condemnation from the international community, including longstanding U.S. allies.

=== Western leaders ===
- Canada – Canadian Prime Minister Justin Trudeau stated Canada would continue to welcome refugees regardless of their faith. At the request of Jenny Kwan, Member of Parliament for Vancouver East, Speaker of the House of Commons Geoff Regan called an emergency debate in the Canadian House of Commons about the order on January 31. Canadian civil society groups including the Canadian Civil Liberties Association and the national branch of Amnesty International issued statements which called for the suspension of the Canada–United States Safe Third Country Agreement. In July 2020, the Canada's federal court ruled that the Safe Third Country Agreement it has with the US does not hold any value since America has been on a spree of violating rights of refugees.

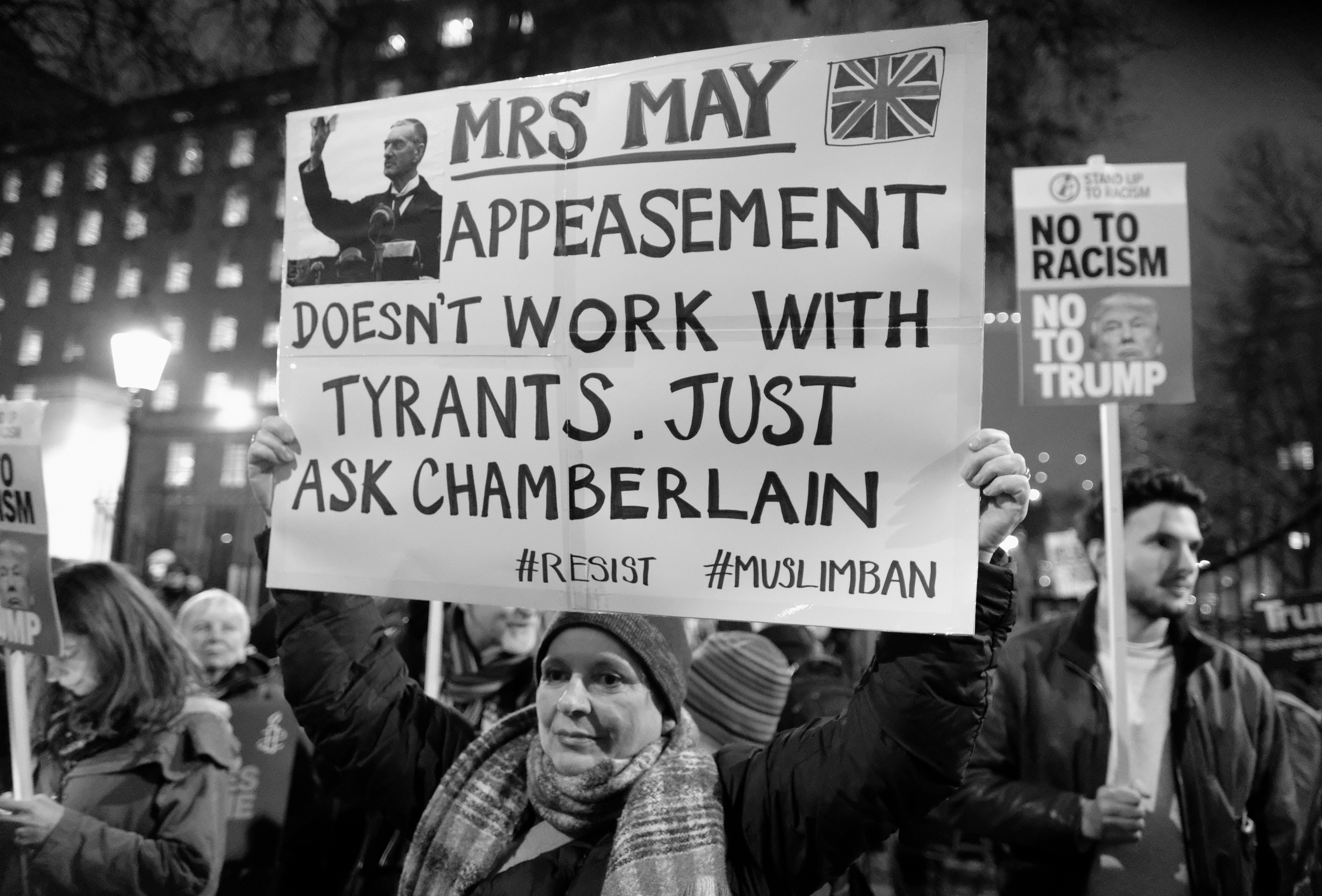
A protest in London against the order, comparing May's offer of a state visit to Chamberlain's appeasement of Hitler.

- UK – British Prime Minister Theresa May was initially reluctant to condemn the policy, having just met with Trump the day prior, saying that "the United States is responsible for the United States policy on refugees". Fellow Conservative Nadhim Zahawi, MP for Stratford-on-Avon, who was born in Iraq, said that he and his (also British Iraqi) wife had been informed would not be able to visit the U.S., despite no longer holding Iraqi citizenship, and called the ban "demeaning and sad". The following day, however, the Prime Minister's Office released a statement that May did "not agree with this kind of approach", and that "it is not one [the United Kingdom] will be taking". Foreign Secretary Boris Johnson said the stigmatisation generated by such an approach was "divisive and wrong". The Foreign Office additionally stated that they had been received clarification on the policy, and that it would apply to dual nationals only if they were travelling to the United States from one of the listed countries. Other British politicians, including Leader of the Opposition Jeremy Corbyn, Liberal Democrat leader Tim Farron, and Mayor of London Sadiq Khan, said that Trump should not come to the UK on a state visit, with Corbyn saying "I am not happy with him coming here until that ban is lifted". More than 1.6 million signed an official parliamentary petition which said that "Donald Trump's well documented misogyny and vulgarity disqualifies him from being received by Her Majesty the Queen or the Prince of Wales."
- France – President François Hollande warned against the protectionist approach taken by U.S President Trump and France's Foreign Minister Jean-Marc Ayrault said, "The reception of refugees fleeing the war, fleeing oppression, is part of our duties".
- Germany – German chancellor Angela Merkel said that "the necessary, decisive battle against terrorism does not justify a general suspicion against people of a certain origin or a certain religion" and in a phone call with Trump, explained to him America's obligations under the Refugee Convention. German foreign minister Sigmar Gabriel stated that "the United States is a country where Christian traditions have an important meaning. Loving your neighbor is a major Christian value, and that includes helping people". Among those affected by the order was the Bundestag member Omid Nouripour, who holds German–Iranian dual citizenship, and is the vice-chair of the German–American Parliamentary Friendship Group; German broadcaster Deutsche Welle reporting on this story said, "Nouripour symbolizes the irrationality of US President Donald Trump's refugee arrival suspension policy and the temporary ban". Nouripour said he was "very happy and proud of all those people at the airport protesting and the voluntary lawyers who have achieved a lot. These are the best reasons to say that no matter what the administration will do, I will always love the United States." In total, around 100,000 Germans were believed to be affected by the law—chiefly German–Iranian dual citizens who are not legally allowed to surrender Iranian citizenship. Merkel's spokesperson has said the German government will "represent their interests, if needed, vis-a-vis our US partners". The Green Party of Germany has asked that if the executive order is not lifted, that Trump should be banned from entering Germany and thus prevented from attending the upcoming G20 Summit in Hamburg.
- Australia – Some media outlets said Australian prime minister Malcolm Turnbull avoided public comment on the order, with Turnbull saying it "is not my job" to criticize it. The Sydney Morning Herald criticized Turnbull's statement as one that was "positive" toward the policy. However, Australian opinion soured after a Tweet by Trump appeared to question a refugee deal already agreed by Turnbull and Obama. The deal, which would have seen the US "take an interest in" up to 1,250 asylum seekers from Australia's offshore detention centers at Manus Island and Nauru, was described on Twitter by Trump as a "dumb deal" which he would "study". In a private phone call with Turnbull, Trump went further and called it "the worst deal ever". In a radio interview, Turnbull denied that the call—which had only lasted 25 minutes instead of the scheduled hour—ended because Trump hung up, but said that he would "expect that the commitment would continue". Sky News Australia journalist Laura Jayes reported that according to government sources, Turnbull now saw Trump as "a bully, and to confront a bully you need to bully back".

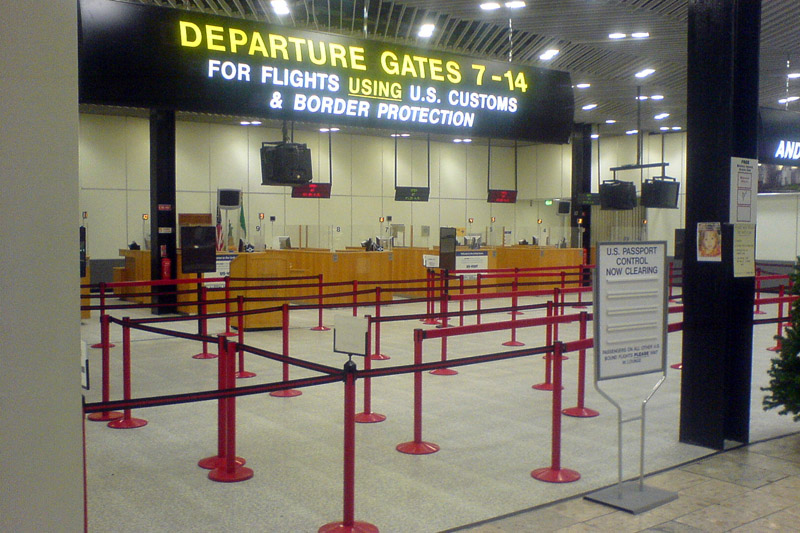
U.S. border preclearance at Shannon Airport.

- Ireland – Enda Kenny, Taoiseach of Ireland, said that he "fundamentally disagrees" with the order. Ireland currently allows US border staff to operate border preclearance at Dublin Airport and Shannon Airport, and several Irish politicians including cabinet member Katherine Zappone noted that implementing the order at these possibly violated Irish and EU human rights law. Kenny announced there would be a "complete review" of these arrangements. As of January 30, one traveler had been prevented from flying at Dublin Airport.
- Netherlands – The Dutch government, which was in negotiations to introduce preclearance at Schiphol Airport, announced that these talks were suspended as a result of the order.
- Sweden – Swedish foreign minister Margot Wallström tweeted that she was "deeply concerned" about the order, and worried it might create "mistrust between people".
- Czechia – Czech President Miloš Zeman praised the order.
- Italy – Foreign Minister of Italy Angelino Alfano said that Trump was "not doing anything other than implementing his promises" and that Europeans should not criticize him as "we too erect walls in Europe".
- Poland – Polish Foreign Minister Witold Waszczykowski defended the ban, stating that every sovereign nation had the right to decide its own immigration policy. He stated that no state had a duty to accept immigrants, adding that Trump was elected president and had the right to impose the ban.

=== Leaders in the Islamic world ===
- Iran – Supreme Leader Ayatollah Khamenei and the Iran's Ministry of Foreign Affairs characterized Trump's order as insulting to the Islamic world and counter-productive in the attempt to combat extremism. It announced that Iran would take "reciprocal measures in order to safeguard the rights of its citizens". Iran's Foreign Minister Mohammad Javad Zarif was quoted by Fars News Agency on January 31 stating that the government will not issue visas to Americans, except in some cases which will be referred to a new committee set up at the Foreign Ministry.
  Akbar Ranjbarzadeh, an MP from the Principalist faction noted that as a government, they "had promised to bring back honor to the Iranian passport, not only has that not happened but America is treating Iranians as a colonized nation".
  In a reciprocal measure carried out on February 3, the Iranian government initially banned American wrestlers from participating in 2017 Wrestling World Cup - Men's freestyle. The ban was however revoked a short time later as an American court put travel restrictions of Trump's executive order on hold. Seventy-two professors of the Sharif University of Technology asked the Iranian government in a letter to respond to the Trump ban by passing a law facilitating the entry of the United States citizens to Iran and allowing their entrance simply via the Iranian Airport Visa within the coming ninety days, so that they would "experience the hospitality and peacefulness of the Iranian nation firsthand".
- UAE – On February 1, the United Arab Emirates became the first Muslim-majority nation to back the order. Foreign Minister Sheikh Abdullah bin Zayed Al Nahyan said that most of the world's Muslim-majority nations were not covered by the order, which he characterized as temporary and a "sovereign decision" of the United States.
- Syria – On February 16, Syrian President Bashar al-Assad has expressed support to President Trump's executive order. During his interview with French media outlets, he explained "that the executive order isn't against the Syrian people, but it's against the terrorists that could infiltrate some of the immigrants and refugees to the Western world. It happened in Europe, mainly in Germany and could happen in the United States in the future."
- Iraq – The response from the Iraqi government has been mixed. The Iraqi government said it understood the security concerns behind Trump's decision to ban Iraqi citizens from entering the US, but underlined that the country's "special relationship" should be taken into consideration. However, the response from the Iraqi parliaments foreign affairs parliament committee called on the Iraqi government to reciprocate the ban and remove all U.S nationals from the country. The predominately Shia Popular Mobilization Forces also condemned the ban and called for the removal of U.S nationals as did popular Shia cleric Muqtada al-Sadr.
- Sudan – Sudan released a statement which labeled the decision as "very unfortunate". The statement read: "It is particularly unfortunate that this decision coincides with the two countries' historic move to lift economic and trade sanctions … and just as economic and financial institutions as well as businessmen in the country were set to continue developing their investment projects."
- Yemen – The Yemeni government did not respond but the Yemen embassy in Washington posted a warning on Facebook to citizens regarding the travel restrictions, and advising them not to travel to or from America.
- Saudi Arabia – Saudi Arabia defended the decision following a meeting between Trump and Deputy Crown Prince Mohammad bin Salman, issuing a statement saying: "Saudi Arabia does not believe that this measure is targeting Muslim countries or the religion of Islam. This measure is a sovereign decision aimed at preventing terrorists from entering the United States of America."
- Turkey – Turkey criticized the decision, with Deputy Prime Minister Mehmet Simsek tweeting that refugees not permitted in the United States were welcome in Turkey.

=== Christians of the Middle East ===
Christian leaders in the Middle East have denounced the executive order. Louis Raphaël I Sako, the Chaldean Catholic Patriarch of Babylon and head of the Chaldean Catholic Church, stated: "Discriminating among those who are persecuted and who suffer based on religion ends up harming the Christians of the East. It provides arguments for all the propaganda and the prejudices that attack Christian communities." Father Rifaat Bader, head of the Catholic Center for Studies and Media in Jordan, said: "Christians are part of the Middle East and they don't accept being treated separately from their co-citizens the Muslims."

=== Others ===
In India Chief Minister of Uttar Pradesh Yogi Adityanath has praised the US President Donald Trump's decision to enact a ban on citizens from 7 Muslim-majority countries entering the United States and has called for India to adopt similar policies to tackle terrorism. The order by Trump was met with no comment by Japan's Prime Minister Shinzo Abe after the Japanese Democratic Party leader asked him. No remarks were forthcoming while other nations leaders remarked on it. No actions were taken by Abe in response. Human Rights Watch asked for Trump to be pressured by Abe.

== Alt-right and far-right politicians and groups ==
Some European far-right groups and politicians applauded the executive order. Dutch politician Geert Wilders, leader of the Party for Freedom, also said he supported the measure as did Alexander Gauland of the right-wing populist party Alternative for Germany (AfD). Nigel Farage, the former leader of the UK Independence Party, welcomed the executive order and called upon his country to replicate it, as did Matteo Salvini of Italy's Lega Nord and Italian Senator Maurizio Gasparri. 2017 French presidential candidate Marine Le Pen supported the executive order, pointing out that many Muslim-majority countries have a permanent travel ban against Israeli citizens, whereas Trump's executive order is a temporary measure. Le Pen's niece, Marion, also spoke in favor of the order.

Some "alt-right" crusading groups including white nationalists, anti-Semites, conspiracy theorists and the Ku Klux Klan praised the executive order. The neo-Nazi website The Daily Stormer was "ecstatic" over the immigration ban. The Southern Poverty Law Center (SPLC) reported that Andrew Anglin of the Daily Stormer advocated for the arrest of Judge Ann Donnelly, who issued a temporary stay on some of the executive order's provisions.

== Arts ==
Iranian actress Taraneh Alidoosti, whose film The Salesman is nominated for an Academy Award, said she would boycott the ceremony to protest the visa ban. Asghar Farhadi, the film's director, may be blocked from attending the ceremony under the terms of Trump's program. The Academy of Motion Picture Arts and Sciences, which holds the ceremony, issued a statement denouncing the travel ban. Comedian Dave Chappelle also spoke against the executive order in Dayton, Ohio. Ellie Goulding wrote that the order was "terrifying." Ewan McGregor called on fellow Britons to "make a stand." Caitlin Moran urged people to subscribe to newspapers that question Trump. Nadiya Hussain expressed sadness over the order. Black-Iranian actress Yara Shahidi noted, "I have family that's already in the states, and I have family in Iran. That was my early birthday present".

Criticism of the executive order was rampant at the 23rd Screen Actors Guild Awards. Dev Patel called it "horrible [and] divisive." Riz Ahmed said, "Now is not a time for escapism." John Legend said, "I believe our country should be open and inclusive, particularly for refugees fleeing war-torn areas." As he walked the red carpet, Simon Helberg held a sign which read, "Refugees welcome." His wife, Jocelyn Towne, had the words "let them in" written across her chest. Julia Louis-Dreyfus said, "This immigrant ban is a blemish and it is un-American." Ashton Kutcher, whose wife Mila Kunis came to the United States on a refugee visa, wrote, "My blood is boiling right now!" Kerry Washington wrote she was "sick to [her] stomach" about the ban.

At the 59th Annual Grammy Awards, Busta Rhymes called Trump "President Agent Orange" and thanked him for his "unsuccessful attempt at the Muslim ban."

== Sports ==
British long-distance runner Sir Mo Farah, who was born in Somalia but holds only a British passport and lives and trains in Oregon, said that "Trump seems to have made me an alien" and that it was "deeply troubling" that he would be unable to train in Oregon or reunite with his family under the terms of the executive order; he also called attention to the difference between Trump's actions and those of Queen Elizabeth II, who had knighted Farah earlier in the year. After clarification, Farah said he was "relieved" he would be able to return to his family in the US

Sami Zayn, a Syrian Canadian professional wrestler, wrote on Twitter, "I can't articulate how truly disgusted I am right now." American fencer Ibtihaj Muhammad wrote, "Our diversity makes our country strong." Dale Earnhardt Jr., a professional stock car racing driver, wrote, "My family emigrated from Germany in 1700s escaping religious persecution. America is created by immigrants." Mixed martial artist Ronda Rousey quoted "The New Colossus" with the hashtag: resist. American football offensive tackle Ryan Harris said the order is "from the playbook of hatred." The widow of Pat Tillman, who left his career in football to serve in the Army after the September 11 attacks, wrote on Facebook, "This is not the country [Pat] dreamed of, not what he served for, and not what he died for." Lebanese Canadian ice hockey player, Nazem Kadri, called the ban "unfortunate."

The soccer community spoke out with Michael Bradley, the captain of the United States men's national soccer team, writing that he was "sad and embarrassed" by the executive order, adding that "the Muslim ban is just the latest example of someone who couldn't be more out of touch with our country and the right way to move forward", while Becky Sauerbrunn, the co-captain of the United States women's national soccer team, called the executive order "un-American." Alejandro Bedoya, Darlington Nagbe, and Sacha Kljestan supported Bradley's sentiments, with Bedoya saying, "[Our national team] is the epitome of diversity in America and what America's all about." Unlike his teammates, Geoff Cameron spoke out in support of the executive order, saying, "A temporary pause on immigration for the purpose of evaluating and improving vetting procedures makes sense."

Members of the basketball community also spoke out to condemn the executive order. Basketball Hall of Famer Hakeem Olajuwon, who is Nigerian American, said, "I can't believe it's actually happening that he's trying to implement that." Magic Johnson called the order "un-American" and said, "[Trump] must stop acting like a dictator." Steve Nash wrote, "Freedom and liberty [are] packing up their things." Nazr Mohammed wrote, "It's a tough day when you find out that so many people that you thought were fans or friends really hate you and everything you believe in." Enes Kanter, who is Turkish, wrote, "I am still in disbelief about the [Muslim ban]." Jeremy Lin, who is Chinese American, apologized to people affected by the executive order, then added, "This is for real getting out of control." Rondae Hollis-Jefferson called the executive order "BS." Luol Deng, who is British Sudanese, said, "Refugees are productive members of society. It's important we humanize the experience of others." Kyle Lowry said, "Our country is the land of the free and for that to happen, I think is bullshit."

Toronto Raptors president Masai Ujiri called the order "ridiculous." Alexander Lasry, the senior vice president of the Milwaukee Bucks, wrote, "This is not who we are as a country and doesn't live up to our ideals." Steve Kerr, the head coach of the Golden State Warriors, said, "What's happening right now is really scary and disconcerting." Stan Van Gundy, the head coach of the Detroit Pistons, compared the order to Japanese internment during World War II and Hitler's registering of Jews. Gregg Popovich, the head coach of the San Antonio Spurs, said that "the roll-out... was Keystone Kops-like by any measure with objectivity."

American wrestling champion Jordan Burroughs—who had just participated in 2017 Wrestling World Cup in Iran—voiced his opposition of the order, saying that he never felt any ill will towards him in Iran, "the opposite actually".

== Business community ==
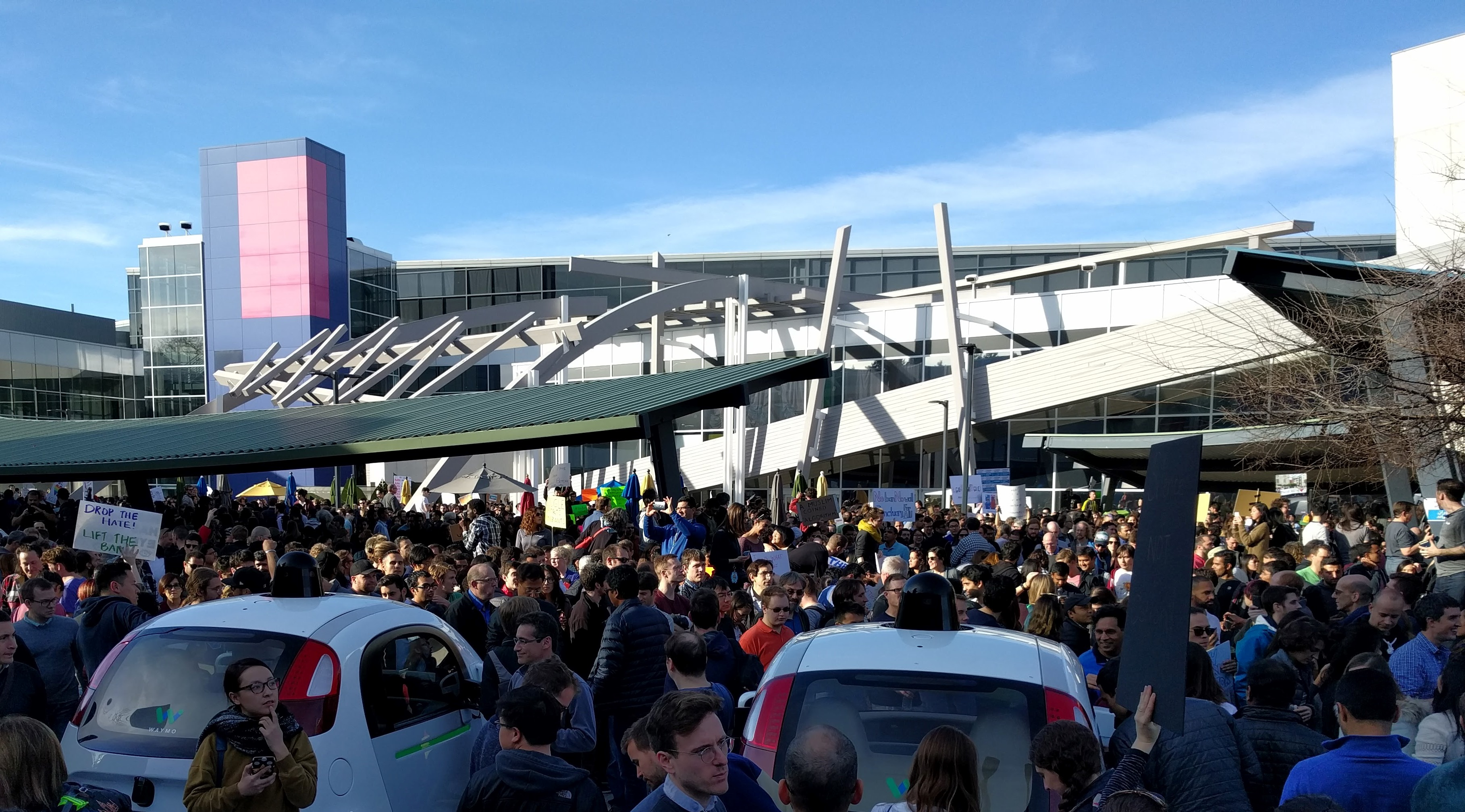
Protests at the headquarters of Google in Mountain View, January 30, 2017. 2,000 Google workers from campuses around the world staged a walkout

Technology companies denounced Trump's ban, and several recalled their employees to the United States. Twitter chief executive Jack Dorsey, Microsoft chief executive Satya Nadella, Apple CEO Tim Cook, Facebook chief executive Mark Zuckerberg, Tesla chief executive Elon Musk, Netflix chief executive Reed Hastings, and Google CEO Sundar Pichai were among the tech leaders who spoke out against the executive order. The Internet Association, a trade association representing Amazon, LinkedIn, and other companies, stated, "The internet industry is deeply concerned with the implications of President Trump's executive order limiting immigration and movement into the United States." Moved by Mo Farah's statement regarding the impact of the executive order, Nike chairman Mark Parker affirmed that his company would stand "together against bigotry and any form of discrimination". In solidarity with refugees affected by Trump's ban, ride-sharing company Lyft donated one million dollars to the ACLU to support legal challenges against the order. Airbnb CEO Brian Chesky offered to provide housing to refugees banned from the United States, and Starbucks CEO Howard Schultz pledged to hire 10,000 refugees at branches around the world over the next five years. The Koch brothers' seminar network stated its opposition to the ban. Organizations in the video game industry also spoke out against the ban, including International Game Developers Association, the Entertainment Software Association, Electronic Arts, Insomniac Games, Zynga, Blizzard Entertainment, and Harmonix and several developers launched efforts through their games to provide donations to the ACLU for the legal challenges. The Ford Motor Co. opposed the executive order, saying that it "goes against our values as a company." Executive director of the Wikimedia Foundation Katherine Maher released a statement opposing the ban, saying that "It threatens our freedoms of inquiry and exchange, and it infringes on the fundamental rights of our colleagues, our communities, and our families." On February 2, thousands of Comcast employees in Portland, Washington, D.C., Philadelphia and Sunnyvale walked off the job in protest of the executive order.

However, several executives & analysts, including Steve Odland former CEO of Office Depot and AutoZone commented that the order won't lead to significant changes in IT hiring practices among US companies since the countries affected are not the primary source of foreign talent.

Small businesses and bodegas in New York City owned by Yemeni immigrants closed from noon to 8 pm on February 2 in protest against the executive order. New York Mayor, Bill De Blasio expressed his support to the protest on Twitter.

== Religious groups ==
=== Muslim Community ===
Extensive protests and activism has emerged in the Muslim community as a result of the order. Hesitation and fear of leaving the United States and not being able to return home has been a widespread reaction. Kashif Abul Karim, imam at Muhammad Islamic Center in Hartford has drawn parallels between the order and the ruling of Korematsu v. United States.

=== Catholic Church ===
Some Catholic leaders have condemned the ban and encouraged mercy and compassion towards refugees. The U.S. Conference of Catholic Bishops stated that "The church will not waiver in her defence of our sisters and brothers of all faiths who suffer at the hands of merciless persecutors". Church leaders speaking against the ban include Chicago cardinal Blaise Cupich (who called the executive action a "dark moment in US history"), bishop Robert W. McElroy of San Diego, bishop Joe S. Vasquez of Austin, cardinal Donald Wuerl of Washington, bishop Michael Francis Burbidge of Arlington, archbishop José Gomez of Los Angeles, and bishop Charles J. Chaput of Philadelphia.

The same opinion is Louis Raphaël I Sako, the Patriarch of Babylon and Head of the Chaldean Catholic Church, who believes that the Executive Order will bring further division between Christians and Muslims in the Middle East and North Africa.

=== Baptist Churches ===
The executive director of the Baptist Joint Committee for Religious Liberty, Amanda Tyler, stated that the executive order was "a back-door bar on Muslim refugees." The director of the Alliance of Baptists, Paula Clayton Dempsey, urged the support of American resettlement of refugees.

However, members of the Southern Baptist Convention were largely supportive of the executive order.

=== Jewish organizations ===
The Economist noted that the order was signed on International Holocaust Remembrance Day, "a time when many Americans recall with anguish the hundreds of German Jewish refugees denied entry to American ports". This fact, as well as Trump's omission of any reference to Jews or Anti-Semitism in his concurrent address for Holocaust Remembrance Day and the ban's possible effect on Muslim refugees, led to condemnation from Jewish organizations, including the Anti-Defamation League, the HIAS, and J Street, as well as Holocaust survivors. Some of these organizations were involved in the protests against the immigration ban at the JFK International airport and in Manhattan, with groups of Jews, on the Sabbath, joining interfaith protests with Muslims against the immigration ban.

=== Jihadists ===
Jihadist and Islamic extremist organizations celebrated the executive order as a victory, saying that "the new policy validates their claim that the United States is at war with Islam." ISIL-linked social media postings "compared the executive order to the U.S. invasion of Iraq in 2003, which Islamic militant leaders at the time hailed as a 'blessed invasion' that ignited anti-Western fervor across the Islamic world." Terrorism analyst Rita Katz, founder of the SITE Intelligence Group, stated that: "Jihadists would have to argue to lengths that Obama, Bush, and others held anti-Islam agendas and hated the religion — not just radical terrorists. Trump, however, makes that argument a lot easier for them to sell to their followers."

== Financial markets ==
The stock market had its biggest drop in 2017 as investors reacted to the curb on immigration. As uncertainty about the executive order continued, investors began to "dump stocks and the dollar" causing the Dow Jones Industrial Average to fall below 20,000. European and Asian markets also closed at lower rates because of the uncertainty surrounding the executive order.

== Public opinion ==
On January 28, FiveThirtyEight discussed the ban, saying "the scope of Trump's executive order is such that we're largely in uncharted waters. Past polls are only so useful, as most of them did not ask about actions as broad as the ones Trump undertook." Summarizing past polls, they found that Americans generally support reductions in immigration and refugee intake numbers, but oppose a religion-based immigration ban and blanket bans.

Polls taken after the executive order was issued demonstrated a split in U.S. public opinion on the order. Different polls yielded different results, based on how the question was asked and the specific phrasing of the question. Additionally, some parts of the order were more popular than others; a particularity that according to The Washington Post reflected "complicated attitudes" on the part of the American public.

A number of national surveys taken in the days following the order's issuance yielded contradictory findings:

- Rasmussen Reports conducted a poll before the Executive order was issued (Jan 25–26), asking likely U.S. voters whether they "favor or oppose a temporary ban on refugees from [the seven listed countries] until the federal government improves its ability to screen out potential terrorists from coming here?" That survey found that 57% supported, 33% are opposed, and 10% are undecided. The Washington Post notes that Rasmussen "typically generates poll results that are friendlier to Republicans than other pollsters."
- An Ipsos/Reuters poll from January 30–31 asked respondents whether they "agree or disagree with the Executive Order that President Trump signed blocking refugees and banning people from seven Muslim-majority countries from entering the U.S." The poll showed that 26% "strongly agree"; 22% "somewhat agree"; 14% "somewhat disagree"; and 27% "strongly disagree" (for total of 48% agree to 41% disagree). The same poll found that a majority agreed that "the U.S. should limit the number of refugees allowed into the country (66% agree, 26% disagree); that the U.S. should welcome refugees from all conflicts, not just certain ones (56% agree, 31% disagree), and that the U.S. should open the borders to those fleeing ISIS (49% agree to 40% disagree). A majority of Americans disagreed that the U.S. should prioritize Christian refugees over Muslim ones (57% disagree, 28% agree). Americans agree that all countries should open their borders to refugees of foreign conflicts (48% agree, 42% disagree), and that singling out a group based on religion violates American principles (44% agree, 39% disagree). Support for the travel ban split along party lines. A majority of Democrats strongly disagreed with Trump's ban, while a majority of Republicans strongly agreed. The poll also found that Republicans were three times more likely than Democrats to believe that "banning people from Muslim countries is necessary to prevent terrorism." The Ipsos/Reuters poll also found that 31% of Americans believed that the ban made them more safe; 26% felt less safe after the executive order, and 33% said that it would not make a difference. 72% of Democrats and 45% of Republicans, disagreed that the country should "welcome Christian refugees, but not Muslim ones."
- A Gallup poll taken on January 30 asked U.S. adults whether they approved of Trump's ordering of "a temporary ban on entry into U.S. for most people from seven predominantly Muslim countries." 55% disapproved, while 42% approved and 3% had no opinion. The majority of American opposed the indefinite suspension of the U.S.'s Syrian refugee program (36% approve, 58% disapprove). There was a major partisan split; 71% of Republicans approved of barring Syrian refugees, while only 35% of independents and 10% of Democrats did.
- A CNN/ORC poll of U.S. adults taken from January 31 to February 2 showed that overall, 47% support the executive order and 53% oppose it. A majority agreed that the ban makes the U.S. less safe from terrorism (46%) as opposed to more safe (41%). More Americans believe that the order harms American values (49%) rather than protects American values (43%). As with the other polls, there was a deep partisan divide; 88% of Democrats oppose the order and 88% of Republicans support the order. (Independents lean against the order, with 54% opposing it.)
- A Politico/Morning Consult poll of U.S. registered voters conducted from February 2 through February 4, showed that 54% of those surveyed said they approved of "Trump's new immigration restrictions" while only 38% opposed them.
