= Alberto J. Safra =

Brazilian-born businessman

- Born: 20 December 1979 (age 46); São Paulo
- Citizenship: Brazil
- Education: Wharton School of Business (B.A.)
- Occupation: Businessman
- Spouse: Maggy Candi
- Children: 5
- Parent(s): Vicky Safra; Joseph Safra

Alberto J. Safra (born 20 December 1979) is a Brazilian-born businessman who founded ASA and is a member of the Safra family.

== Biography ==
Safra was born to a Syrian Jewish family, the son of Vicky (née Sarfaty) and Joseph Safra (1938–2020). He has three siblings: Jacob J. Safra, Esther Safra Dayan (married to Carlos Dayan, son of Sasson Dayan), and David J. Safra. He graduated from the Wharton School of Business. and then went to work for his father where he shared responsibility for Banco Safra in Brazil with his younger brother David (Alberto was responsible for corporate banking while David was responsible for investment banking). His brother Jacob managed the Safra group's international operations (Safra National Bank of New York and J. Safra Sarasin of Switzerland). In 2012, his father acquired 100% of Banco Safra.

In 2019, Alberto stepped down from the bank's administration and from his position on the Board to dedicate himself to personal projects. It was reported that he left after a dispute with his brother David over Banco Safra's expansion into retail banking. He then founded ASA Investments, a São Paulo-based asset-management firm with offices in Rio de Janeiro and New York. In 2022, ASA acquired CORE, a real estate fund.

The multimarket ASA Hedge, Alberto Safra's main fund, showed the best profitability in 2022 out of 188 funds monitored by Bloomberg, and was ranked among the best in the market, reaching first place in September in the ranking published by UOL, with its profitability emphasized by G1 among multimarket funds with the highest return in 2022: 318% of CDI. ASA Hedge defied a trend of record redemptions for the Brazilian fund industry in 2022, recording around R$1.7 billion in net raising for the year, compared to R$84 billion in net redemptions in multimarket funds.

In October 2020, his father died leaving his fortune to his wife and four children. In 2021, he challenged three new wills his father executed in November and December 2019, arguing that his father lacked the mental capacity due to his suffering from advanced Parkinson's disease.

In January 2023, Bloomberg reported that Alberto Safra is close to reaching an agreement to sell his stake in Grupo J.Safra to his siblings. By 2024, Alberto and his family reached an amicable agreement that set new business directions for all.

From that, Alberto turned his full attention to ASA, focusing on consolidating his vision for the company's future. ASA had established itself as a full-service financial institution, operating in the segments of Asset Management, Wealth Management, Private Banking, Corporate Banking, and retail.

In June 2025, several media outlets reported that ASA acquired the investment firm Gauss Capital. Following the transaction, Gauss’ products and team were integrated into ASA’s operations.

In November 2025, ASA purchased a development site on Rebouças Avenue, in São Paulo, with the intention of building a new office for his investment firm. According to the articles published, ASA had been looking for a location in that area for the past couple of years, and the acquisition was described as reflecting the “dynamism” and confidence in the city’s corporate real estate market.

== Net worth ==
According to the Forbes list of The World's Billionaires, as of October 2021, his mother was worth $7.4 billion; and he and his siblings were collectively worth $7.3 billion making each individually a billionaire. Vicky and her children as of May 2026 were collectively worth $25.8 billion.

== Personal life ==
In November 2006, he married Maggy Candi; they have 5 children.
