= Thwaiba Kanafani =

Canadian Syrian engineer

- ثويبة كنفاني
- Born: 1972 (age 53–54); Damascus, Ba'athist Syria
- Other name: Thwaiba Kalafani
- Occupation: Engineer
- Known for: Volunteered to fight with Syrian rebels

Thwaiba Kanafani (Arabic: ثويبة كنفاني; born 1972) is a Syrian-Canadian engineer whose 2012 decision to volunteer to fight with Syrian rebels against the Bashar al-Assad regime triggered world-wide coverage. In August 2012, Tom Coghlan, writing in The Times of London, described her as "the female face of the Syrian revolution". She encouraged other women to also join the Free Syrian Army. The world-wide media coverage encouraged young Muslims to travel to Syria to fight against Assad, many of whom would later join ISIS.

== Life ==
Kanafani had emigrated to Canada in 2002, after working in the United Arab Emirates. She and her husband raised a family in Toronto.

In the months leading up to her decision to volunteer, Kanafani described participating in social media discussions about the unrest in Syria, and the number of deaths of innocent civilians. She described being encouraged to volunteer by her older brother. Her husband and children joined her, and established a home in Egypt prior to her travel to Turkey for military training.

The Free Syrian Army broadcast a YouTube recruiting video showing Kanafani surrounded by other fighters, where she announced she had joined the Banner of Damascus Falcons Troop of Aleppo Martyrs.

In early August 2012, Kanafani had crossed back into Turkey, after two of her bodyguards were killed.

In October 2012, Armina Ligaya writing in the National Post reported on Kanafani's return to Canada. She quoted Kanafani remaining committed to return to Syria. Kanafani had not served as a front-line fighter, and had not been called upon to fire her weapon. Her duties had consisted of committee meetings, visiting refugee camps, and other recruiting activities. Kanafani had also gone underground, and had scouted areas still occupied by al-Assad loyalists.

In an October 2012 profile of Khaled Sawaf, president of the Syrian Canadian Council, Simon Kent, writing in the Toronto Sun, reported that Sawaf described Kanafani.

“There are many thousands of Syrians like her who found refuge in Canada, starting in the 1980s, back when president Bashar al-Assad’s father murdered 40,000 people in Hama. We are grateful to be free and in peaceful Canada. Its open door to refugees is famous around the world. But Syrians in Canada still worry about all our friends and relatives left behind. Sometimes it is very hard to sleep with worry.”

In 2015, the Toronto Star described Kanafani as having left the front lines after growing disillusioned.
