= Vicky Safra =

Greek-born billionaire

- Born: Vicky Sarfati; 1 July 1952 (age 74); Thessaloniki, Greece
- Citizenship: Greece
- Occupation: Philanthropist
- Spouse: Joseph Safra
- Children: 4, including Alberto J. Safra

Vicky Safra (Greek: Βίκυ Σάφρα; born 1 July 1952) is a Greek-born billionaire and member of the Safra family.

== Biography ==
Safra was born Vicky Sarfati (Βίκυ Σαρφάτη) in Athens, Greece, the daughter of Fortunée (née Eskenazi) (1926–2015) and Alberto El Sarfaty (1914–2003). In 1969, she married Joseph Safra (1938–2020). Her husband died in 2020 leaving his fortune to her and their children. She heads the Joseph Safra Philanthropic Foundation.

She is a citizen of Greece but lives in Crans-Montana, Switzerland. She had four children with her husband: Jacob J. Safra, Esther Safra Dayan (married to Carlos Dayan, son of Sasson Dayan), Alberto J. Safra, and David J. Safra. Jacob is responsible for the international operations (Safra National Bank of New York and J. Safra Sarasin of Switzerland) while David manages Banco Safra in Brazil.

As of May 2026, Forbes estimated her net worth at US$26.5 billion, one of the richest people in Brazil or Greece.
