= Alfred Emanuel Sarasin =

Swiss politician (1922–2005)

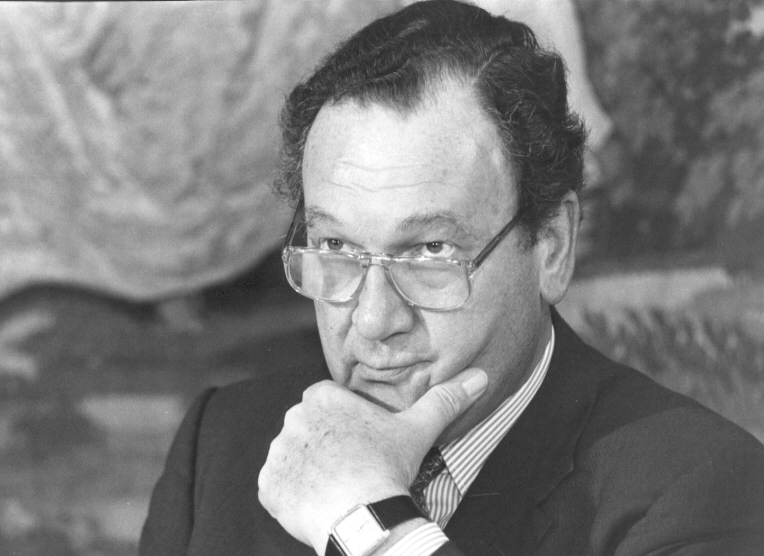
- Born: 13 April 1922; Basel, Switzerland
- Died: 8 May 2005 (aged 83)
- Occupations: Banker and politician

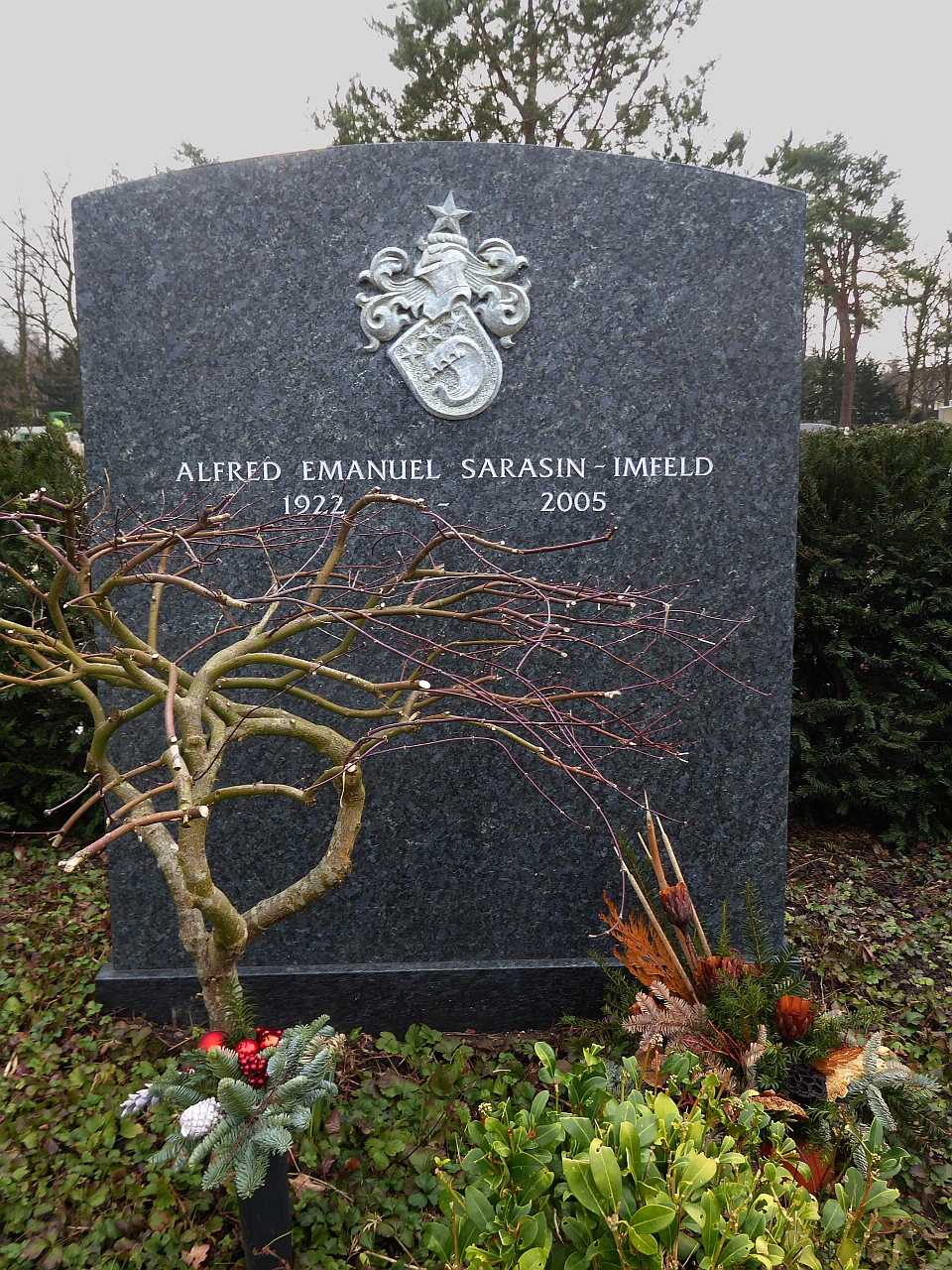
Grave at the cemetery at Hörnli, Riehen, Basel-Stadt

Alfred Emanuel Sarasin (13 April 1922 – 8 May 2005) was a Swiss banker and politician.

His grandfather was Alfred Sarasin-Iselin. His father was banker, Bernhard Sarasin, who died at an early age in 1950. Alfred E. Sarasin became successor in the management of the bank Sarasin. From 1954 to 2005, he worked well beyond his own business for the Swiss banking industry, presided from 1965 to 1986 for the Swiss Bankers Association and was also President of the Bank Council of the Swiss National Bank. In 1987, the company A. Sarasin & Cie became a limited partnership with the newly converted name, Bank Sarasin & Cie.

After his death, the bank was sold in 2007 by the bankers Erik Sarasin, Andreas Sarasin and Yves Sarasin to the Dutch Rabobank. Rabobank sold the bank later to the Safra Group in Geneva.
