= Jacqui Safra =

Swiss investor (born 1947)

- Born: Jacob Eli Safra; 1947 (age 78–79)
- Occupation: Investor
- Partner: Jean Doumanian
- Family: Edmond Safra (uncle); Moise Safra (uncle); Joseph Safra (uncle); Jacob Safra (grandfather)

Jacqui (Jacob) Eli Safra (born 1947) is a Swiss investor from Geneva. He is a descendant of the Syrian Jewish Safra banking family.

== Biography ==
Jacqui Eli Safra is the son of Elie Safra (1922–1993) and his wife Yvette Dabbah (1927–2006) and the nephew of Edmond Safra. He is a graduate of the Wharton School of the University of Pennsylvania and worked in various positions at the Republic National Bank of New York.

Some of Safra's investments include Encyclopædia Britannica, Inc., Spring Mountain Vineyard (Saint Helena, California), Parknasilla Hotel and neighbouring Garinish Island (both near Sneem, County Kerry, Ireland).

== Filmography ==
Under the name J.E. Beaucaire (the name of the character played by Bob Hope in the film Monsieur Beaucaire), Safra appeared in minor roles in three movies and financed eight Woody Allen films through a production company, Sweetland Films, run with his long-time girlfriend Jean Doumanian, a former close friend of Allen.

=== Actor ===
- The Ox (1991) – Shop Owner
- Radio Days (1987) – Diction Student
- Stardust Memories (1980) – Sam

=== Executive producer ===
- Small Time Crooks (2000)
- Just Looking (1999)
- Women Talking Dirty (1999)
- Sweet and Lowdown (1999)
- Celebrity (1998)
- Into My Heart (1998)
- The Spanish Prisoner (1997)
- Deconstructing Harry (1997)
- Wild Man Blues (1997)
- Everyone Says I Love You (1996)
- Mighty Aphrodite (1995)
- Don't Drink the Water (1994) (TV film)
- Bullets over Broadway (1994)
- The Ox (1991)

== Additional references ==
- Weinraub, Bernard. (June 11, 2001). "A Friendship Founders Over Suit by Woody Allen". The New York Times, p. 1.
- Claffey, Mike & Goldiner, Dave. (June 6, 2002). "Judge Backhands Woody's Rival". Daily News (New York), p. 8.
- Claffey, Mike & Goldiner, Dave. (June 7, 2002). "Woody's Backer Admits to Some Overcharging". Daily News (New York), p. 4.
- Wapshott, Nicholas. (June 7, 2002). "To the jury, Woody Allen's former friend Jean Doumanian must appear scheming and grasping, while the diminutive comic seems a classic dupe" The Times (London).
