= Shafran =

Shafran is a surname which derived from eastern Yiddish shafran and originated from Arabic زعفران (az-za'faran).

The root of the surname lies in the spice saffron. The Russian version is Шафран (Shafran). There are various forms of the name in Russia. Polish version is Szafran. The surname has also existed in various forms in Hebrew (שפרן), Old French, Hungarian, and Middle High German. The name is most common among Jewish and Russian families. It is known to be ornamental, used to describe someone with saffron-colored (yellow-red) hair, occupational, used to describe a merchant of the spice, and topographic, for someone who lived where saffron grew. Common forms of this name include "Safran", "Safranek", "Safranski", and "Szafran". Shafran may be cognate with the name "Safra".

== People with the surname Shafran ==
- Daniil Shafran (1923–1997), Soviet cellist
- Eva Shafran (1906–1944), American Communist
- Isaak Grigorevich Shafran, creator of Shafran's hexagonal chess
- Nigel Shafran (b. 1964) English photographer
- Robert Shafran (b. 1961), an American triplet profiled in the 2018 documentary film, Three Identical Strangers

== See also ==
- Ashkenazi Jews, those who speak Yiddish
- Zəfəran, Azerbaijan
