= Portrait of a Lady, dressed in a gold embroidered costume =

Painting by Artemisia Gentileschi

Artemisia Gentileschi, Portrait of a Lady, dressed in a gold embroidered costume, c.1620, Private Collection

Portrait of a Lady, dressed in a gold embroidered costume is a painting by the Italian baroque painter Artemisia Gentileschi. It is assumed to have been painted in the early 1620s, just after Artemisia had moved to Rome. It currently belongs in a private collection. The identity of the sitter is not confirmed, but strongly believed to be Caterina Savelli, “Principessa di Albano”.

The painting was put up for sale by Jacqui Safra at Sotheby's in January 2022 with an estimate of 2-3 million dollars. It was eventually sold for 2.6 million US dollars.

== See also ==
- List of works by Artemisia Gentileschi
