= The Ox (film) =

- US theatrical poster
- Directed by: Sven Nykvist
- Screenplay by: Sven Nykvist; Lasse Summanen
- Based on: Oxen by Siv Cedering
- Produced by: Jean Doumanian
- Starring: Max von Sydow; Ewa Fröling; Stellan Skarsgård; Erland Josephson; Liv Ullmann
- Cinematography: Sven Nykvist
- Edited by: Lasse Summanen
- Release date: 22 November 1992
- Running time: 92 minutes
- Country: Sweden
- Language: Swedish

The Ox (Swedish: Oxen) is a 1991 Swedish drama film directed by Sven Nykvist. Collaborating with Lasse Summanen, Nykvist penned the screenplay adapted from the 1981 novel Oxen by Siv Cedering.

The film was nominated for the Academy Award for Best Foreign Language Film at the 64th Academy Awards in 1992.

== Plot ==
Sweden in 1867: For two years, famine has gripped the population due to crop failures. Helge Roos, fearing for the lives of his daughter Anna and wife Elfrida, impulsively kills one of his master Svenning Gustavsson's oxen. Though shocked, Elfrida helps him butcher the animal and hide the meat. During Christmas with Svenning and Maria, Maria notices the missing ox, prompting a search led by Helge. When the search fails, Svenning assumes theft, oblivious to the truth.

To preserve the meat, Helge steals salt, witnessed by Soldier Flyckt, who suspects Helge's crime. Flyckt reports Helge to the vicar, who advises against rash action due to their history. With the ox's meat, Helge's family survives the winter, but suspicions linger. When the meat runs out in spring, hunger returns. Helge tries to sell the ox's hide but is caught by the vicar, who reports him, resulting in a harsh sentence.

Flyckt reveals the truth to Elfrida, leading to ostracism for Helge. The vicar's attempts to help fail due to Svenning's refusal. Elfrida resorts to desperate measures to survive, leading to an illegitimate child. Helge is eventually released in 1873 when Svenning signs a petition. Returning home, he confronts the truth but reconciles with Elfrida, understanding her actions were to save their family. They go on to have six more children together.

== Cast ==
- Stellan Skarsgård - Helge Roos
- Ewa Fröling - Elfrida Roos
- Lennart Hjulström - Svenning Gustavsson
- Max von Sydow - Vicar
- Liv Ullmann - Mrs. Gustafsson
- Björn Granath - Flyckt
- Erland Josephson - Sigvard Silver
- Rikard Wolff - Johannes
- Helge Jordal - Navvy
- Agneta Prytz - Old Woman
- Björn Gustafson - Officer in command
- J.E. Beaucaire - Shop Owner
- Debora Hjälmarö - Helge's and Elfrida's daughter Anna

== Reception ==
=== Awards and nominations ===
It was nominated for the Academy Award for Best Foreign Language Film at the 64th Academy Awards in 1992. It was also screened in the Un Certain Regard section at the 1992 Cannes Film Festival. Sven Nykvist was nominated for the Best Cinematography award at the 27th Guldbagge Awards.

== See also ==
- List of submissions to the 64th Academy Awards for Best Foreign Language Film
- List of Swedish submissions for the Academy Award for Best Foreign Language Film
