= Syrian Canadians =

Canadians of Syrian ancestry

Total population
- 98,250

Regions with significant populations
- Ontario: 42,525
- Quebec: 31,590

Languages
- Canadian English, Canadian French, Arabic (Syrian Arabic), Armenian, Kurdish, Turkmen, Aramaic

Religion
- Christianity, Islam, Druze and Judaism

Syrian Canadians are Canadians who claim Syrian ancestry and newcomers who have Syrian citizenship. According to the 2016 Census, there were 77,050 Syrian Canadians compared to the 2011 Census where there were 50,840.

== History ==
Syrians started immigrating to the Americas in the early part of the 1880s, while the vast majority migrated to South America, a small percentage made their way to America, and an even smaller percentage settled in Canada. The overwhelming majority of Syrians who settled in Canada from the 1880s to 1960s were of the Christian faith. The so-called Shepard of the lost flock, Saint Raphael Hawaweeny of Brooklyn, New York, came to Montreal in 1896 to help establish a Christian association called the Syrian Benevolent Society and then later on an Orthodox church in Montreal for the newly arrived Syrian faithful.

When Justin Trudeau was elected as Prime Minister of Canada in 2015, over 25,000 Syrian refugees settled in Canada.

== Demography ==
=== Religion ===
Syrian Canadian demography by religion
Religious group	2021 (Note: Religious breakdown proportions based on "Syrian" ethnic or cultural origin response on the 2021 census.)		2001 (Note: Religious breakdown proportions based on "Syrian" ethnic or cultural origin response on the 2001 census.)	
Religious group	Pop.	%	Pop.	%
Islam	47,895	48.75%	5,555	25.17%
Christianity	39,115	39.81%	14,820	67.15%
Irreligion	9,365	9.53%	1,515	6.86%
Judaism	595	0.61%	120	0.54%
Hinduism	35	0.04%	0	0%
Buddhism	20	0.02%	15	0.07%
Indigenous spirituality	20	0.02%	—N/a	—N/a
Sikhism	10	0.01%	0	0%
Other	1,200	1.22%	50	0.23%
Total Syrian Canadian population	98,250	100%	22,070	100%

Syrian Canadian demography by Christian sects
Religious group	2021		2001	
Religious group	Pop.	%	Pop.	%
Catholic	16,515	42.22%	8,535	57.61%
Orthodox	10,060	25.72%	3,115	21.03%
Protestant	2,505	6.4%	1,875	12.66%
Other Christian	10,035	25.66%	1,290	8.71%
Total Syrian Canadian christian population	39,115	100%	14,815	100%

== Economic life ==
The leading factor for the immigration of Syrians has been to find better employment. The early immigrants found themselves engaging in basic commerce, with the term 'peddler' becoming almost synonymous with 'Syrian'. Most of these peddlers were successful, and, with time, and after raising enough capital, some became importers and wholesalers, recruiting newcomers and supplying them with merchandise. Others opened small businesses in urban centers all over the country. Later, these merchants would go towards larger urban locations, where the economy was improving. Smaller number of Syrians worked as laborers in factories, miners, or as plumbers. Also, some became pioneers in the Southern prairie regions of Western Canada, and worked in farming. These workers settled in communities such as Swift Current, Saskatchewan, and Lac La Biche, Alberta. Few reached the Northwest Territories, the best known being Peter Baker, author of the book An Arctic Arab, and later elected as a member of the legislative assembly of the Northwest Territories. By the 1930s, many towns in the Maritimes, Quebec, Ontario, and Western Canada had one or more retail stores run by Syrian immigrants.

Women also worked occasionally, in addition to housekeeping, and usually helped run the family store if they had one, and in the cities they would sell goods from door to door.

== Notable Syrian Canadians ==
- Omar Alghabra, former Minister of Transport and Member of Parliament from Mississauga Centre
- René Angélil, Canadian singer and manager (father was of Syrian descent)
- Paul Anka, Canadian singer and songwriter (father was Syrian)
- Feras Antoon, businessman
- Ayah Bdeir, entrepreneur and founder of LittleBits
- Tirone E. David, cardiac surgeon and professor of surgery at the University of Toronto. Known for developing the "David Operation”.
- Tony Clement, Canadian Member of Parliament from Parry Sound-Muskoka. Mother of Syrian descent.
- Moshe Safdie, architect who designed Marina Bay Sands and Jewel Changi Airport
- Dov Charney, founder of American Apparel and Los Angeles Apparel
- Sam Hamad, former Member of the Quebec National Assembly (MNA) for the riding of Louis-Hebert and former Quebec Minister of Employment and Social Solidarity.
- Jamal Murray, NBA basketball player
- Jack Kachkar, Syrian Canadian businessman of Armenian descent
- Wiz Kilo, Canadian hip hop and R&B artist
- Ruba Nadda, Canadian film director of mixed Syrian-Palestinian origin
- Rami Sebei, Canadian professional wrestler best known for his work under the ring name El Generico, currently signed to WWE under the ring name Sami Zayn
- Sammy Yatim, Canadian shot by a Toronto police officer
- Molham Babouli, Syrian Canadian professional soccer player for York United and the Syrian national football team
- Marshall Rifai, Syrian Canadian professional Ice Hockey player for the Toronto Maple Leafs and Toronto Marlies

== Popular culture ==
Sabah, a 2005 film directed by Ruba Nadda, portrays a Syrian Canadian family in Toronto.

== See also ==
- Canada-Syria relations
- Arab Canadians
- Kurdish Canadians
- Lebanese Canadians
- Middle Eastern Canadians
- West Asian Canadians
