= Tulip (tower) =

Proposed skyscraper in London, England

- Interactive map of the Tulip area

General information
- Status: Rejected
- Type: Observation Tower
- Location: London, EC3, United Kingdom
- Coordinates: 51.5145°N 0.0800°W
- Client: J Safra Group

Height
- Height: 305 m (1,000 ft)

Technical details
- Floor count: 12

Design and construction
- Architecture firm: Foster + Partners
- Structural engineer: Foster + Partners
- Services engineer: Foster + Partners

The Tulip was a 305-metre (1,001 ft) observation tower proposed to be constructed on 20 Bury Street in the City of London. The Tulip is a proposal by Brazilian billionaire Jacob Safra, of the Safra Group, the owner of the adjacent Gherkin building. The proposal was rejected on 11 November 2021.

== History ==
=== Initial application and opposition ===
The Tulip was designed by Foster + Partners, Britain's largest architectural practice, with the intention of complementing The Gherkin, which the company also designed. The tower was to be a visitor attraction without any office space. If built, the Tulip would have been London's second tallest building. Work was planned to have started as early as 2020 with a scheduled completion date of 2025.

On 19 November 2018, an application for the building was submitted to the City of London planning authority. It faced opposition from Historic England and Historic Places, who argued that the tower would impact views of the Tower of London, and the Greater London Authority expressed "significant concerns" about the design. London City Airport officials insisted that National Air Traffic Services (NATS) be consulted regarding the impact rotating gondolas would have on its radar systems; NATS responded that "it was satisfied that no impact from either the building or the moving gondolas is anticipated." London Mayor Sadiq Khan opposed its construction, saying that the tower breaches the London Plan by restricting free entry to the publicly-accessible viewing platform. He also said that the protected views of the Tower of London would be harmed. Despite this opposition, a survey completed by 1,011 Londoners in December 2018 suggested that two-thirds believed the tower would be "an attractive addition to the London skyline".

=== Rejection and revived plans ===
After the city's planning and transportation committee approved the scheme on 2 April 2019, Khan refused planning permission for the tower on 15 July. Historic England welcomed the rejection, saying in a statement: "We have long been of the opinion that this is the wrong building in the wrong place. We advised that its height and design – essentially a tall lift shaft with a bulge on top – would cause permanent and irreversible damage to the setting of the Tower of London, and in turn, the image and identity of the capital."

In October 2021, in a change of events, UK housing secretary Michael Gove was expected to approve the construction of the Tulip, which would overrule Khan's previous decision. The government backed the City of London Corporation, which originally approved the building and promoted it as "an important role in further realising a vision for the Square Mile as a vibrant 24/7 world-class destination." However, Gove finally rejected the proposal on 11 November 2021.
