= Siv Cedering =

American poet

- Born: February 5, 1939; Överkalix, Sweden
- Died: November 17, 2007 (aged 68); Sagaponack, New York, United States
- Occupations: Poet; writer; artist
- Spouse: Hans Van de Bovenkamp
- Writing career
- Pen name: Siv Cedering Fox
- Period: 1969–2007
- Genres: Poetry, children's literature, novels
- Website: www.cedering.com

Siv Cedering (February 5, 1939 – November 17, 2007) was a Swedish-American poet, writer, and artist. She occasionally published as Siv Cedering Fox.

== Early life ==
Siv Cedering was born 30 kilometers south of the Arctic Circle in rural Överkalix, Norrbotten County, Sweden, the second of four children. She began writing poetry at age 8. At 14, she immigrated with her family to San Francisco, where she graduated from Lowell High School.

== Career ==
A poet and fiction writer, Siv Cedering wrote many books in her native Swedish, as well as in English, her second language, publishing a total of 20 books and four works of translation. She also wrote plays, screenplays, music, and television programs, and was a widely exhibited painter and sculptor. She was self-taught, having never received any formal training, though she was mentored by such notable poets as William Stafford. She later went on to teach in Graduate and Undergraduate writing programs all over the country.

Ms. Cedering won the Best Book of the Year Award in Sweden for her first novel Playing in the Pig House. This story is an autobiographical account of her early decision to celebrate creativity. She wrote children's books, including a playful series of books about an introspective pig who wrote poetry, some of which were adapted for television, for which Ms. Cedering wrote the music and provided the character drawings. Another of her novels, Oxen, was made into the 1991 film The Ox starring Stellan Skarsgård and directed by Sven Nykvist, Ingrid Bergman's longtime cinematographer. The Ox went on to receive a nomination for an Academy Award for Best Foreign Language Film.

Ms. Cedering's poetry and prose have appeared in over 200 anthologies, textbooks, and magazines, including Harper's, Ms., Science, and The New Republic. She also wrote musicals for children and won prizes and grants for her screenplays. While gaining success as a poet and fiction writer, Ms. Cedering expressed herself in the visual arts, mastering the techniques of both painting and sculpture with a skill that led to her work being exhibited first in the Hamptons and later throughout the United States.

== Professional observations ==
- "Siv was a one of a kind force of the spirit, a total original, who will never be replaced."—Bill Henderson, founder of Pushcart Press and editor of The Pushcart Prize
- "Siv was a remarkable woman, devoted to poetry and active in her devotion." – Donald Hall, former Poet Laureate of the United States

== Bibliography ==
Poetry

- Cup of Cold Water, with photographs by the author (New Rivers Press, 1973)
- Letters From the Island (Fiddlehead Books, 1973)
- Letters From Helge, with song by the author (New Rivers Press, 1974)
- Mother Is, Stein and Day (1975)
- How To Eat a Fortune Cookie, with illustrations by Sally Soper Bowers (New Rivers Press 1976)
- The Juggler, with illustrations by Bill Brauer (Sagarin Press, 1977)
- Color Poems, with illustrations by friends of the author (Calliopea Press, 1978)
- Twelve Pages From the Floating World (Calliopea Press, 1981)
- Ukiyo-e (Harper's Magazine, September, 1981)
- Letters From the Floating World: Selected and New Poems (University of Pittsburgh Press, 1984)
- Letters From an Observatory: New and Selected Poems 1973–1998 (Karma Dog Editions, 1998)
- Vixen, with drawings by Connie Fox (Pushcart Press, 2007)

Children's and Young Adult Books

- The Blue Horse, and Other Night Poems (New York: Houghton Mifflin/Clarion, 1979)
- Grisen som ville bli ren (Stockholm: Rabén & Sjögren, 1983)
- Polis, polis, potatisgris (Stockholm: Rabén & Sjögren, 1985)
- Grisen som ville bli julskinka (Stockholm: Rabén & Sjögren, 1986)
- Grisen far till Paris (Stockholm: Rabén & Sjögren, 1987)
- Mannen i ödebyn (Stockholm: Rabén & Sjögren, 1989)

Novels

- Leken i grishuset (Stockholm: Prisma, 1980)
- Oxen (Stockholm: Prisma, 1981)

Works Translated

To English from Swedish:

- Two Swedish Poets: Gösta Friberg and Göran Palm (New York: New Rivers Press, 1974)
- You and I and the World, poems by Werner Aspenström, Merrick, (New York: Cross-Cultural Communications, 1980)
- Pearl's Adventure (translated with David Swickard from Pärlsork, by Lars Klinting) (New York: R&S Books/Farrar, Straus and Giroux, 1987)

To Swedish from English, Spanish, Danish:

- Det Blommande Trädet (Native American Poetry) (Stockholm: Forum, 1973)

== Awards ==
- 1995–99 Författarfonden, Swedish Writers Foundation: Five Year Salary Grant (for fiction and TV programs)
- 1992 New York Foundation for the Arts, Artist's Fellowship (screenwriting)
- 1992 Academy Award Nomination for Best Foreign Film (based on novel by SC)
- 1991 East End Arts Council, Photography Show, Exhibition Prize
- 1985 New York Foundation for the Arts, Artist's Fellowship, (poetry)
- 1985 Science Fiction Poetry Association, Rhysling Award (poem on scientific theme)
- 1985 Pushcart Prize (poetry)
- 1980 Svenska Dagbladet, Best Books of the Year Award (novel)
- 1977 Poetry Society of America, Emily Dickinson Award
- 1977 Pushcart Prize (fiction)
- 1977 New York State Council on the Arts, New York State Artists in Exhibition
- 1975 New York State Council on the Arts (video)
- 1976 1974-5 New York State Council on the Arts, CAPS Fellowship (poetry)
- 1974 Best Poems of 1973: Borestone Mountain Poetry Awards
- 1973 Modernage Photography Gallery, Discovery Award (Exhibition Prize)
- 1970 Saturday Review, Photography Prize
- 1970 Poetry Society of America, William Marion Reedy Award
- 1969 Poetry Society of America, John Masefield Award
