= Szafran =

Szafran is a Polish surname. Notable people with the surname include:

- Helena Szafran (1888–1969), Polish botanist
- Sam Szafran (1934–2019), French artist
- Gene Szafran (1941–2011), American artist

== See also ==
- Shafran
