= Tirone E. David =

Canadian cardiac surgeon

Tirone Esperidiao David, OC OOnt FRCS (born November 20, 1944) is a Brazilian-born Canadian cardiac surgeon and professor of surgery at the University of Toronto Faculty of Medicine. He is an attending cardiac surgeon at the Peter Munk Cardiac Centre, Toronto General Hospital. He is known for his 2007 development of a valve sparing aortic root replacement procedure to preserve the aortic valve in patients with aortic root aneurysms such as in Marfan syndrome; it is now known as the "David Operation".

== Early life and education ==
Born in Ribeirão Claro, Brazil, to a Syrian Jewish father and an Italian mother, David graduated from the Universidade Federal do Paraná as a medical doctor in 1968. He completed his surgical internship at SUNY Downstate Medical Center and his general surgery residency at Cleveland Clinic in Cleveland. In 1975, he came to Toronto to train in cardiovascular and thoracic surgery at the University of Toronto Faculty of Medicine.

== Career ==
He joined the academic staff of Toronto General Hospital in July 1978. He was chief of cardiovascular surgery at Toronto Western Hospital from 1980 through 1989 and Toronto General Hospital from 1989 through 2011. In 2004, he was elected University Professor, the highest honour the University of Toronto bestows its professors. From 2004-2005, he served as president of the American Association for Thoracic Surgery.

He has published extensively in peer reviewed journals, is the author of many chapters in surgical textbooks, and is the editor or co-editor of 5 surgical textbooks.

David has received numerous awards. In 1993 he was elected as a member of the Order of Ontario, and in 1996, he was made an Officer of the Order of Canada.

He is also a member of the Canadian Marfan Association's Professional Advisory Board.
