= Safra, Iran =

Safra صفرا
- Village
- Location within Iran
- Coordinates: 30°45′49″N 48°46′43″E
- Country: Iran
- Province: Khuzestan
- County: Shadegan
- Bakhsh: Central
- Rural District: Hoseyni

Population (2006)
  - Total: 138
- Time zone: UTC+3:30 (IRST)
  - Summer (DST): UTC+4:30 (IRDT)

Safra (Persian: صفرا, also Romanized as Şafrā; also known as Şafrá-ye Ka‘bī and Şafrā-ye Ka‘bī) is a village in Hoseyni Rural District, in the Central District of Shadegan County, Khuzestan Province, Iran. At the 2006 census, its population was 138, in 20 families.
