= Joseph Safra =

Lebanese-Brazilian banker (1938–2020)

- يوسف صفرا
- Born: 1 September 1938; Beirut, Lebanon
- Died: 10 December 2020 (aged 82); São Paulo, Brazil
- Citizenship: Lebanon; Brazil
- Organization: Safra Group
- Known for: The richest banker in Brazil
- Spouse: Vicky Sarfati
- Children: 4, including Alberto J. Safra
- Father: Jacob Safra
- Relatives: Moise Safra (brother); Edmond Safra (brother)

Joseph Safra (Arabic: يوسف صفرا; 1 September 1938 – 10 December 2020) was a Lebanese Brazilian banker and billionaire businessman. He was Brazil's richest man and the richest banker in the world, running the Brazilian banking and investment empire, Safra Group.

Joseph Safra was the chairman of all Safra companies, among them Safra National Bank of New York and Banco Safra headquartered in São Paulo, Brazil. In August 2020, Forbes reported Safra's estimated net worth at US$22.8 billion, the 52nd richest person in the world and richest in Brazil.

== Early life ==
Joseph Safra was born and raised in Beirut, Lebanon to a Jewish family that, according to Safra family's own sources, originally came from Aleppo, Syria, and with banking connections dating back to Ottoman times. The family's banking history began in Aleppo with the foundation of the family's first banking house in 1841, Aleppo was one of the major hubs of commerce and a mandatory route from the East to Europe, and from the latter to Persia and inner Asia. The Safra family financed trade and exchanged currencies for tradesmen, who came to the city through the desert and the Mediterranean, they were also involved in the Gold trade. The Safra family moved to Brazil in 1953, where his father founded an import and retailer of machinery, metal and cattle company, the a Safra Importação e Comércio.

== Career ==
In 1955, Joseph's 23-year-old brother, Edmond Safra, and his father, Jacob Safra, started working in Brazil by financing assets in São Paulo. However soon, Edmond Safra separated from his brothers Joseph and Moise and headed to New York City where he founded the Republic National Bank of New York (which he later sold to HSBC in 1999 and donated most of his money to the Edmond Safra Foundation). Joseph Safra founded Banco Safra in 1955 and today it is reportedly the 6th largest private bank in Brazil. In 2006, Joseph Safra acquired the remaining shares of Banco Safra from his brother Moise Safra. He remained the chairman of the Safra Group, offering banking services throughout Europe, North America, and South America, until the end of his life.

=== Property ===
In 2013, Joseph Safra's family acquired more than a dozen properties in the United States, primarily in New York City. They also own a portfolio of commercial real estate in Brazil, including the Safra Mansion in São Paulo.

In 2014, Safra paid more than £700 million to buy The Gherkin, one of the most distinctive towers in the City of London. He proposed to build the Tulip, a skyscraper in London, but the city's mayor rejected it in 2019. He founded the Jewish Brazilian school of Beit Yaacov in 2001.

=== Business holdings ===
- Chiquita
- Safra Group
  - Banco Safra
  - J. Safra Sarasin
  - Safra National Bank of New York

== Personal life ==
Safra was a resident of Geneva, Switzerland. In 1969, he married Vicky Sarfati. They had four children: Jacob J. Safra, Esther Safra (married to Carlos Dayan, son of Sasson Dayan), Alberto J. Safra, and David J. Safra. Jacob is responsible for the international operations while David manages Banco Safra in Brazil.

Safra died on 10 December 2020 in São Paulo at the age of 82. He had Parkinson's disease.

After his death, his son Alberto sued his brothers' Jacob and David contesting his father's will.

== See also ==
- List of Brazilians by net worth
