= Banco Safra =

Brazilian financial services company

Banco Safra S.A.

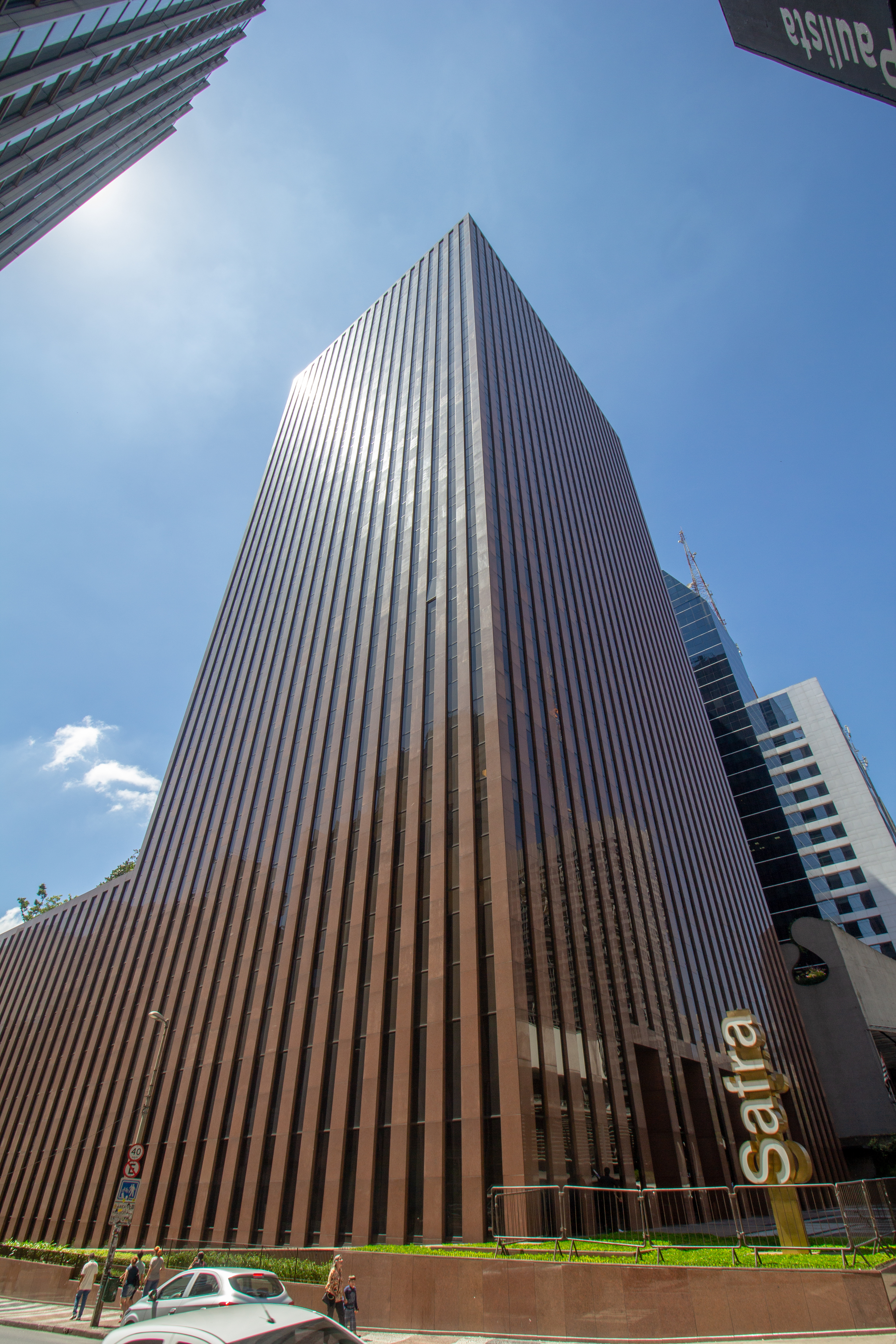
- Banco Safra headquarters in São Paulo
- Type: Privately held company
- Industry: Finance and Insurance
- Founded: 1955
- Headquarters: São Paulo, Brazil,
- Key people: Carlos Alberto Vieira (chairman)
- Products: Financial services
- Revenue: ▲US$5.9 billion (2012)
- Net income: ▲US$575.1 million (2013)
- Total assets: ▲US$55.4 billion (2012)
- Number of employees: 5,456
- Parent: Safra Group
- Subsidiaries: Bank Sarasin
- Website: safra.com.br

Banco Safra is a Brazilian financial services company headquartered in São Paulo. It is the seventh largest banking institution in Brazil and the nineteenth largest in Latin America. It provides services in investment banking, private banking, asset management and retail banking through its neobank AgZero. The bank is part of the financial holding company Safra Group.

== History ==
The Syrian Safra family's history in banking originated with caravan trade between Aleppo, Alexandria and Istanbul during the Ottoman Empire. With the collapse of the Ottoman Empire after the First World War the Safras moved to Beirut. The Safras decided to move to Brazil in 1952. In the 1960s, Joseph Safra and his father, Jacob Safra, founded Banco Safra, S.A. Most of the Brazilian Sephardic Syrian Jewish community established themselves as retail or wholesale merchants. After having established many financial institutions in Lebanon's capital, Beirut in the 1950s, the Safras set up a small specialized bank which originated letters of credit between Sephardic importers and major banks. From this base they grew via the acquisition and opening of new branches.

In 2012 Joseph Safra purchased the remaining shares of Banco Safra, Safra National Bank of New York and Banque Safra-Luxembourg S.A. from his brother, Moise Safra.

== Operations ==
A full-service commercial bank, Banco Safra S. A. operates in all areas of the financial sector. Through its major Brazilian subsidiaries, Safra Leasing, Safra Seguros S. A., Safra Distribuidora de Títulos e Valores Mobiliários and Safra Corretora de Valores e Câmbio Ltda., the bank's activities extend beyond traditional lending operations to leasing, securities underwriting, investment fund management, stock brokerage and insurance operations. The bank is also active in trade finance, asset management and treasury operations.

== See also ==
- Safra Group
- Bank Jacob Safra Switzerland
- Safra National Bank of New York
- J. Safra Sarasin
- Joseph Safra
- Edmond Safra
