= Bank Jacob Safra Switzerland =

Commercial banking institution

- Company type: AG
- Industry: Banking
- Founded: 2000
- Fate: merged with Bank Sarasin (2013)
- Successor: J. Safra Sarasin
- Headquarters: Geneva, Switzerland
- Key people: Joseph Safra (Chairman)
- Products: Financial services
- Number of employees: 250
- Parent: Safra Group
- Website: www.jsafra.com

Bank Jacob Safra (Suisse) AG was a full-service commercial banking institution headquartered in Geneva, Switzerland. As part of the Safra Group of financial institutions, in 2013, it merged with Bank Sarasin & Cie, when that bank was purchased by the Safra Group, with the combined entity being named J. Safra Sarasin.

== Services ==
Apart from Geneva, Bank Jacob Safra (Suisse) AG was present in Zürich, Lugano, Gibraltar, and Monaco. The majority of its operations consisted of financial services and private wealth management. In addition the bank also offered brokerage services, bond trading, lease financing, and correspondent banking.

== History ==
Named after Jacob Safra, the patriarch, the bank started its operations through the acquisition of Uto Bank AG (Zürich) in June 2000. It grew to 15 billion CHF of assets under management in less than 6 years.

In February 2006, Bank Jacob Safra expanded its operations in Monaco through the acquisition of the Monaco operations of Banca Gottardo the Banque du Gothard (Monaco) bringing it to 17.2 billion CHF in assets under management.

In 2013, Safra Group acquired Bank Sarasin & Cie, combining the two companies to become Bank J. Safra Sarasin.

== See also ==
- History of the Jews in Lebanon
- Edmond Safra
- Moise Safra
