= Thomas R. Kline School of Law =

Thomas R. Kline School of Law may refer to:

- Drexel University Thomas R. Kline School of Law
- Thomas R. Kline School of Law of Duquesne University
