= Moise Safra =

Lebanese-Brazilian businessman (1934–2014)

- Born: Moise Yacoub Safra; April 5, 1934; Beirut, French Lebanon
- Died: June 15, 2014 (aged 80); São Paulo, Brazil
- Occupations: Banker; philanthropist
- Spouse: Chella Cohen
- Children: 5
- Parent(s): Jacob Safra; Esther Safra
- Relatives: Joseph Safra (brother); Edmond Safra (brother)

Moise Yacoub Safra (Arabic: موسى يَعْقُوب صفرا ; April 5, 1934 – June 15, 2014) was a Lebanese-Brazilian businessman and philanthropist. He co-founded Banco Safra with his brothers Edmond Safra and Joseph Safra.

== Early life ==
Moise Safra was born on April 5, 1934, in Beirut, Lebanon, into a family of Sephardic Jewish background originally from Aleppo, in modern Syria, and was the son of Jacob Safra.

The family's history in banking originated with caravan trade between Alexandria and Constantinople during the Ottoman Empire. The family relocated from Aleppo to Beirut after World War I as Beirut was home to an already thriving Jewish community. Eventually, the Safras decided to move to Brazil in 1952. In 1955, Moise's 23-year-old brother, Edmond Safra, and their father, Jacob, started working in Brazil by financing letters of credit for trade in São Paulo.

== Career ==
He established himself in Brazil where he acquired citizenship and founded Banco Safra with his brothers Edmond and Joseph Safra. He was also a prominent Jewish philanthropist.

== Death ==
He died on June 14, 2014, reportedly from heart failure, at the age of 80. He was buried at the Cemitério Israelita do Butantã in São Paulo, Brazil. He was survived by his wife Chella Cohen Safra and five children: Jacob Moise Safra, Azuri "Ezra" Moise Safra, Edmundo "Edmond" Moise Safra, Esther Safra Szajman (married to Claudio Szajman, son of Abram Szajman), and Olga Safra.

== See also ==
- Safra Group
- Safra National Bank of New York
- Bank Jacob Safra Switzerland
