= Safra National Bank of New York =

American private bank

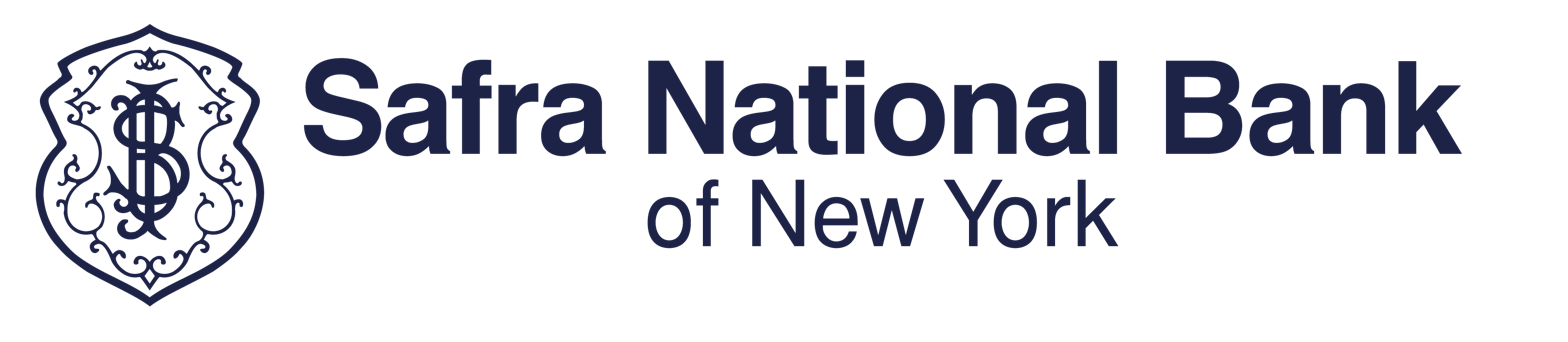

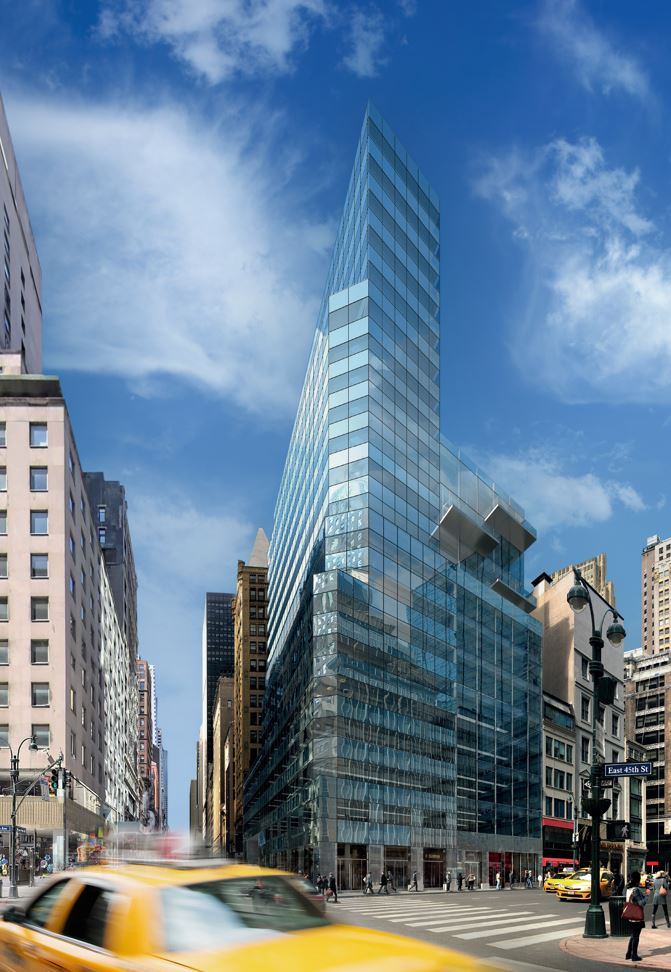
- Company type: Privately held company
- Industry: Private Banking
- Founded: 1987
- Headquarters: New York City, United States
- Key people: Simoni Morato (CEO); Jacob Safra (Chairman)
- Number of employees: 300
- Parent: Safra Group
- Website: https://www.safra.com/

Safra National Bank of New York is an American privately held bank based in New York City, which provides services in investment banking, private banking, and asset management, to high-net-worth individuals, businesses, family offices and sophisticated investors in the U.S. and internationally.

== History ==
Safra National Bank of New York is part of the J. Safra Group, which consists of privately owned banks under the Safra name, such as Banco Safra S.A. and J. Safra Sarasin, all independent from one another with more than 170 locations worldwide. The group is also owns more than 200 premier commercial, retail and farmland buildings properties worldwide, such as New York City’s 660 Madison Avenue office complex and London’s Gherkin Building and agribusiness, such as the Chiquita Bananas.

Safra National Bank is headquartered in New York City, with branches in Aventura and Palm Beach in Florida and has representative offices in Brazil, Chile, Mexico and Panama. Through its affiliates, it also serves clients in various markets, including Argentina and Uruguay.

The company slogan is: "If you choose to sail upon the seas of banking, build your bank as you would your boat, with the strength to sail safely through any storm." (Jacob Safra)

== See also ==
- Bank Jacob Safra Switzerland
