= Sasson Dayan =

Lebanese-born Brazilian banker

- Born: April 1, 1940 (age 86)
- Known for: Co-founder of Banco Daycoval
- Spouse: Clairy Sasson
- Parent: Salim A. Dayan

Sasson Dayan is a Lebanese-born Brazilian banker and co-founder of Banco Daycoval. As of May 2026, Forbes estimated his net worth at $1.7 billion.

== Biography ==
Sasson was born on April 1, 1940 in Lebanon to a Syrian-Lebanese Jewish family, that initially had a lighter business in Aleppo, Syria, before moving to Beirut, Lebanon. There, he worked at Casa Bancária Salim A. Dayan, a bank founded by his father. In the 1950s, he immigrated to Brazil. In 1958, he and his brother Ibrahim Dayan co-founded the stock brokerage Daycoval DTVM Ltda. In 1970, they founded Valco Corretora de Valores Ltda. In 1989, they received government approval to convert Daycoval DTVM Ltda into Banco Daycoval which specializes in lending to medium size companies.

His son Carlos Dayan is married to Esther Safra Dayan, daughter of Vicky and Joseph Safra. Per Forbes Magazine as of September 2014, he was worth 1.6 billion Brazilian Reais ($709 million US dollars).
