= Daycoval =

Brazilian financial institution

Banco Daycoval S.A.
- Type: Private
- Founded: 1968; 58 years ago
- Founders: Sasson Dayan, Alberto Dayan
- Headquarters: São Paulo, Brazil
- Products: Corporate credit, payroll loans, auto financing, foreign exchange, asset management, insurance
- Revenue: R$ 1.514 billion (2024, recurring net income)
- Net income: R$ 434.6 million (Q1 2026, recurring)
- Total assets: R$ 81.7 billion (March 2025)
- Number of employees: 4,000+
- Website: www.daycoval.com.br

Banco Daycoval S.A. is a Brazilian financial institution founded in 1968 and headquartered in São Paulo. The bank specializes in corporate lending and also operates in the retail segment with payroll loans, vehicle financing, foreign exchange, and investment management. Known for its conservative management profile, Daycoval has a national presence with 53 branches and over 250 service points across 21 states and the Federal District, as well as an international branch in Grand Cayman, Cayman Islands.

== History ==
- The journey of Daycoval began in Aleppo, modern-day Syria, where the Dayan family ran a lighter business.
- 1952 – Establishment of Casa Bancária Salim A. Dayan in Lebanon, focused on commercial operations.
- 1968 – Creation of Daycoval DTVM in São Paulo.
- 1989 – Licensed as a multiple bank under the current name.
- 2004 – Launch of the Daycred brand for payroll loans and creation of Daycoval Asset Management.
- 2007 – IPO on B3’s Level 1 Corporate Governance segment, raising approximately R$ 1 billion.
- 2008 – Opening of the first international branch in Grand Cayman.
- 2015 – Acquisition of CIT Brazil, strengthening leasing operations.
- 2024 – Acquisition of BMG Seguros and launch of Daycoval Brokerage and the Global Account.
- 2025 – Completion of the Daycoval Seguros S.A. acquisition, incorporating corporate insurance services.

== Operations and products ==
- Corporate Credit: focused on small and medium enterprises, including working capital and leasing.
- Payroll and Auto Loans: payroll loan portfolio (R$ 16.3 billion in Q1 2025) and auto financing (R$ 2.8 billion).
- Foreign Exchange: tourism and international trade transactions, including Cayman branch operations.
- Asset Management: Daycoval Asset managed R$ 20.9 billion as of March 2025 and received the top MQ1.br rating from Moody’s Local Brasil.
- Capital Markets: R$ 6 billion issued through the Debt Capital Markets division in Q1 2025.
- Insurance: performance guarantees and corporate sureties.
- Fiduciary Services: comprehensive services for all types of funds and managed portfolios, as well as custody and legal representation for non-resident investors.

== Financial performance ==
As of March 31, 2025:

- Net income: R$ 451.8 million (+22.8% YoY)
- Recurring net income: R$ 473.1 million (+32.8% YoY), recurring ROAE of 26% (8th year above 20%)
- Total assets: R$ 81.7 billion (+9.2% YoY)
- Expanded credit portfolio: R$ 62.2 billion (+12.8% YoY)
- Total funding: R$ 60.7 billion
- Basel III ratio: 14.5%

In 2024, recurring net income totaled R$ 1.514 billion (+25.9% YoY), with a ROAE of 22.4%.

== Governance ==
The bank follows the Brazilian Institute of Corporate Governance (IBGC) guidelines and maintains audit, risk, and sustainability committees.

== Ratings ==
- Fitch Ratings: BB (global), AA+(bra) (national), stable outlook.
- Moody’s Global/Local: Ba1 / AA+.br; Daycoval Asset was rated MQ1.br by Moody’s Local Brasil in 2025.

== Recognition ==
- LinkedIn Top Companies 2025 – among the best institutions (under 5,000 employees) for professional growth.
- Valor Econômico – Guia Grandes Grupos 2021 – listed among Brazil's 20 largest banks by revenue and profit.

== See also ==
- List of banks in Brazil
- Financial system of Brazil
