= Valve-sparing aortic root replacement =

- Other names: David procedure
- Specialty: Cardiology, cardiothoracic surgery

Valve-sparing aortic root replacement (also known as the David procedure) is a cardiac surgery procedure which is used to treat Aortic aneurysms and to prevent Aortic dissection. It involves replacement of the aortic root without replacement of the aortic valve. Two similar procedures were developed, one by Sir Magdi Yacoub, and another by Tirone David.

== Techniques ==
The valve-sparing aortic root replacement allows for direct narrowing of enlarged aortas, which change the fluid dynamics of outbound blood from the heart, while preserving the natural tissues of the aortic valve, which means the patient does not have to rely on anticoagulants. Common features of both techniques of the replacement process are the clamping of the aorta and the use of a length of Dacron tube (also known as an "aortic graft"), typically 5 cm, to constrict the aortic root to the normal diameter, while the patient is cooled to 20°C and placed on life support. The procedure typically takes 4 to 6 hours in healthy patients.

=== Re-modeling technique ===
Established by Sir Magdi Yacoub in the mid-1990s, the process involves cutting the aorta superior of (slightly downstream of) the aortic valve and attaching the tube, one end of which has been shaped into a three-lobed wavy ring, directly to the commissures connecting the aortic valve to the aortic wall. In other words, the "sinotubular junction" holding the aortic valve in place is reformed with the tube flush with the outermost valve tissue, and extending between the valve's cusps.

=== Re-implantation technique ===
Established by Tirone E. David and Christopher Feindel at the Toronto General Hospital in 2007, this technique differs in the shape of the Dacron tube's end, which here is a ring with a flat edge, and its location, with the sinotubular junction "inserted" into the tube. In other words, the tube acts like a "corset" on the outside of the wall surrounding the aortic valve, though the tube's attachment points are the same as in the Yacoub method.

== Results ==
A 2023 literature review of David method patient outcomes after 2010 found that the chances of complications such as endocarditis and stroke, were reduced to 0.3%, while survival rates were 99% within a year and 89% within a decade afterward. The most common reason for follow-up (typically needed in 5 years) was minor chest bleeding, reported by 5.4% of patients.

== See also ==
- Aortic aneurysm
- Aortic dissection
- Marfan syndrome
