= Safra Group =

International network of companies controlled by the Safra family

J. Safra Group

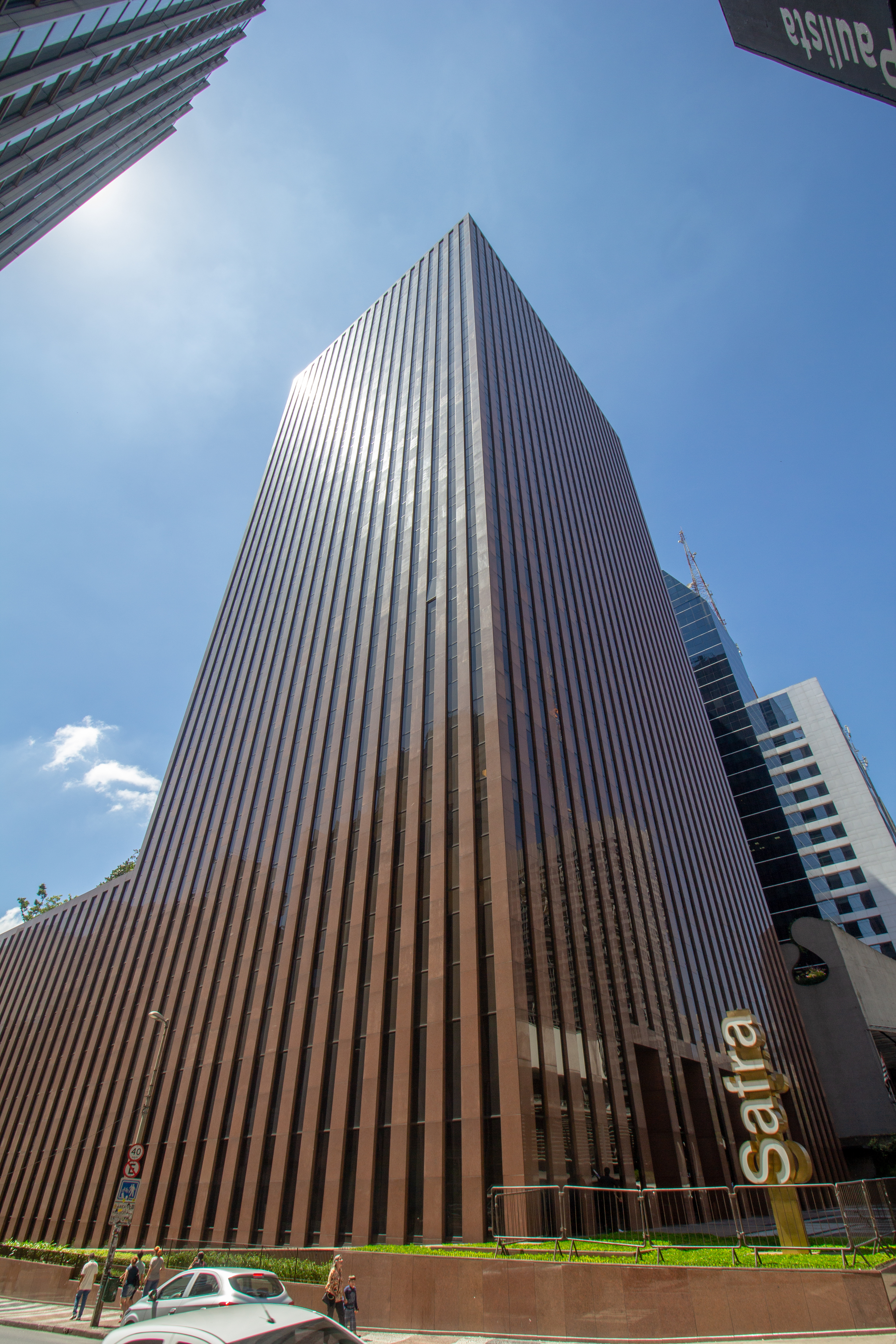
- Headquarters in São Paulo, Brazil
- Type: Private
- Industry: Conglomerate
- Headquarters: São Paulo, Brazil
- Key people: Jacob J. Safra; David J. Safra
- Products: Financial services
- Total assets: US$ 500 billion (2025)
- Owner: Safra family
- Number of employees: 32,200
- Subsidiaries: J. Safra Sarasin; Banco Safra; Safra National Bank of New York; Saxo Bank
- Website: www.safra.com.br

The J. Safra Group is a conglomerate comprising an international network of companies controlled by the Greek born Vicky Safra family, comprising banking and financial institutions and industrial operations. It is present in the United States, Europe, the Middle East, Latin America, Asia and the Caribbean.

== History ==
In the early nineteenth century, Safra Frères et Cie., the family's first financial institution, was founded in the Ottoman Empire in Aleppo, Syria. Further economic expansions prompted the family to open new branches in Beirut, followed by Istanbul and Alexandria. In the early 1900s, Beirut was chosen as headquarters of the newly founded Bank Jacob Safra. Following the end of World War II, Jacob Safra expanded the new banking activities toward Europe and later to Latin America and the United States.

In 1953, the Safra family moved to Brazil, establishing Banco Safra in 1972.

In May 2011, it purchased 20% of the pulp and paper company Eco Brasil Florestas for R$160 million. In November 2011, it bought 46% of Swiss bank Sarasin for US$1.13 billion. In 2012, the J. Safra Group came to hold all of Sarasin's shares after making an offer to acquire stakes from minority shareholders.

In November 2014, it bought for 726 million pounds (or 2.9 billion reais) one of the largest buildings in London, 30 St Mary Axe or Gherkin.

== Slogan ==
Each bank has its own slogan in its local language for marketing purposes. They all involve security and solidity.

However, the J. Safra Group general slogan is present in every Safra Company and has been kept graven in stone for over a century. Composed of a quote from the patriarch Jacob Safra that underlines the group's long term strategy, it reads:

If you choose to sail upon the seas of banking,
build your bank as you would your boat,
with the strength to sail safely through any storm.

== Major companies ==
- Safra National Bank of New York has a core business of private banking. It has branches in and around New York and in Florida, as well as representative offices in Mexico, Brazil, Argentina, Chile and Uruguay. As a complement to its core business, the bank also offers securities trading through its independent registered broker-dealer, Safra Securities Corp.; global securities trading capabilities through its investment division; international correspondent banking services, and international trade finance. The bank is a member of both the Federal Reserve System and the Federal Deposit Insurance Corporation (FDIC). Safra Securities Corp. is a member of the Financial Industry Regulatory Authority (FINRA). Within the United States, the privately owned Safra National Bank of New York serves high-net-worth individuals, local businesses, and international corporations through branches in New York and Miami. It offers CDs, investment funds, money market instruments, and alternative investments. In addition to wealth management, the bank also performs brokerage services, bond trading, and correspondent banking.
- J. Safra Sarasin is the sixth largest Swiss Bank. J. Safra Sarasin is represented worldwide in 26 locations in Europe, Asia, the Middle East and Latin America. The Group's head office is in Basel, Switzerland. It was formed in 2013 when Safra Group acquired Bank Sarasin, and merged it with the group company Bank Jacob Safra Switzerland.
- Banco Safra S.A. is Brazil's sixth largest commercial bank. Banco Safra S.A. operates in all areas of the financial sector. Traditionally a corporate bank, Banco Safra has expanded its retail banking operations throughout recent years. Through its major Brazilian subsidiaries, Banco J. Safra S.A., Safra Leasing S.A. Arrendamento Mercantil, J. Safra Asset Management, Safra Vida e Previdência S.A., and J.Safra Corretora de Valores e Câmbio Ltda., the bank’s activities extend to leasing, securities underwriting, investment fund management, brokerage, insurance and credit operations. The bank is a relevant player in trade finance, asset management and treasury operations.
- Banco Safra (Cayman Islands) Limited is a wholly owned subsidiary of Banco Safra S.A., incorporated under the laws of the Cayman Islands. Known as Safra Cayman, the institution provides trade-financing services to its clients and correspondent banks, as well as other branches and divisions within the Safra Group. It also offers a broad range of commercial and financial services, especially in the trade finance area.

== Assets and shareholder equity ==
As of 2005, The Group controlled about 71.5 billion in assets of which 36.9 billion are client assets and it has 6.3 billion stockholders' equity.

== Acquisitions ==
In November 2022, it was announced Safra Group had acquired the New York-headquartered private bank, Delta North Bankcorp and its subsidiary, Delta National Bank and Trust.

== See also ==
- Edmond Safra
- Bank Jacob Safra Switzerland
