= J. Safra Sarasin =

Swiss private bank

Bank J. Safra Sarasin Ltd
- Type: Private (Aktiengesellschaft)
- Industry: Financial services
- Founded: February 20, 1841; 185 years ago in Basel, Switzerland
- Founder: Johannes Riggenbach
- Key people: Juerg Haller (Chairman); Elie Sassoon (CEO)
- Products: Investment advice and asset management
- Number of employees: 2,425 (2023)
- Parent: Safra Group
- Subsidiaries: Saxo Bank
- Website: jsafrasarasin.com

J. Safra Sarasin (formerly Bank Sarasin & Co. Ltd) is a Swiss private bank, founded in 1841 and headquartered in Basel, Switzerland. It is currently owned by the Brazilian J. Safra Group, and was formed in its present state in 2013, when Safra Group acquired Bank Sarasin & Co. Ltd, merging it with its Bank Jacob Safra Switzerland subsidiary.

J. Safra Sarasin performs investment advice and asset management for private and institutional clients, as well as investment funds. It offers further services in investment, corporate finance and financial analysis.

The company was formerly listed on the SIX Swiss Exchange from 1987 to 2013 before it was acquired by Safra Group.

== History ==
Founded on 20 February 1841 as Riggenbach & Cie by Johannes Riggenbach-Huber, son of a worker of a tape factory from Basel who had risen to partner within Bank Ehinger & Cie. The company was originally devoted to trade, shipping and banking. After two years, his son Frederick Riggenbach joined the business, which he directed after Johannes Riggenbach's death in 1860. By 1876, the bank had thrived and entered trading at the Basel Stock Exchange.

On 1 January 1900, Alfred Sarasin-Iselin purchased the company from Fritz Riggenbach and founded the general partnership A. Sarasin & Cie with Arthur Streichenberg-Mylius, giving the establishment its name of Sarasin. Under this leadership, Bank Sarasin developed into one of the most prestigious and longest-established private banks in the Swiss financial market.

From 1954 to 2005, Emanuel Sarasin, grandson of Alfred Sarasin-Iselin, directed the bank. He was also president of the Swiss Bankers Association from 1965 to 1986. In 1987, the company became a private company limited by shares, under the name Bank Sarasin & Cie. In 2002, it converted into a Joint-stock company, with the Dutch group Rabo taking a share and options to purchase more; it exercised these options in late 2006, by then holding 46.1% of the capital and 68.6% of votes. Rabobank Switzerland was itself purchased by Safra on 25 November 2011.

By late June 2012, Safra Holding already held 50.15% of the share capital and 71.01% of the votes; in October 2012, Safra had acquired further shares through a public offer, and had 99.47% of the votes. Safra then cancelled the remaining shares held by the public in April 2013, delisting the bank from the SIX Swiss Exchange. As part of the merger between Bank Sarasin and Bank Jacob Safra Switzerland into Bank J. Safra Sarasin AG, the bank announced on 27 May 2013 that Edmond Michaan, former managing director of Bank Jacob Safra, would replace Joachim H. Straehle as CEO of Sarasin.

In 2026, J. Safra Sarasin bought Danish financial firm Saxo Bank.

== See also ==
- Jacob Safra
- Sarasin family
