= Jacob Safra =

Syrian Jewish banker (1891–1963)

- Born: Jacob Elie Safra; 9 January 1891; Aleppo, Ottoman Syria
- Died: 27 May 1963 (aged 72); São Paulo, Brazil
- Occupation: Banker
- Spouses: Esther Teira Safra; Marie Dwek Safra
- Children: 8, including Edmond Safra, Joseph Safra, and Moise Safra

Jacob Safra (Arabic: يعقوب صفرا; 9 January 1891 – 27 May 1963) was a Syrian banker and patriarch of the Safra family. The Safras were bankers and gold traders engaged in the financing of trade between Aleppo, Alexandria, Beirut and Istanbul.

== Biography ==
The Safra family was a merchant Jewish family originally from Aleppo, Syria, which historically made its money from financing the caravans of the Middle East.

In the early 20th century, as economic conditions weakened the Ottoman Empire, many Aleppines, including Jacob Safra, fled to Beirut and beyond. Despite reportedly being ‘attached to every house, every stone, every alley’ of Aleppo, Safra reluctantly left for Beirut in 1914 to establish a new branch of Safra Frères Bank, which was founded in the mid-19th century; later, Jacob established his first bank in the 1920s, building on the Safras' long experience in gold and currency exchange. With its base in Lebanon, the Banco Jacob E. Safra became the bank of choice for many of Syria's and Lebanon's rich Sephardic Jewish families, who trusted the Safras to manage their business and personal financial interests with care and discretion. The bank did business with agricultural, precious metal and merchant traders, and it offered both credit and savings accounts. The bank was later renamed Banque de crédit national S.A.L. (BCN) and is one of the five oldest banks in Lebanon.

In 1952, he moved to Brazil with his four sons: Elie, Edmond, Joseph and Moise. They founded a Brazilian financial institution in 1955.

== Personal life ==
In 1920, Safra married his cousin Esther Teira (1904–1943). They had four sons: Elie, Edmond, Joseph, and Moise; and four daughters: Evelyn, Gabi, Arlette, and Hugette. In 1943, his wife died during childbirth at the age of 39. In 1950, he remarried to Marie Dwek (1911–1967).

Safra Square in Jerusalem is named in honor of him and his wife.
