= Inescapable (film) =

- Movie poster
- Directed by: Ruba Nadda
- Written by: Ruba Nadda
- Produced by: Daniel Iron and Lance Samuels
- Starring: Alexander Siddig; Marisa Tomei; Joshua Jackson; Oded Fehr
- Cinematography: Luc Montpellier
- Edited by: Teresa Hannigan
- Music by: Geo Höhn; Jim Petrak
- Production companies: Foundry Films; Out of Africa Entertainment
- Distributed by: Alliance Films
- Release dates: 11 September 2012 (Toronto International Film Festival); 22 February 2013 (United States)
- Running time: 93 minutes
- Country: Canada
- Languages: English; Arabic
- Budget: CAD$5 million
- Box office: $4,327

Inescapable is a 2012 Canadian political thriller film written and directed by Ruba Nadda. The film stars Alexander Siddig, Marisa Tomei, and Joshua Jackson. Siddig plays Adib, a former Syrian intelligence officer who becomes embroiled in a cat and mouse chase while trying to locate his photographer daughter, Muna, in Damascus. After an assignment in Greece, Muna takes a detour trip to Syria, where she becomes wrongly accused of espionage and held hostage by corrupt government agents. Inescapable follows Adib's struggle to return to Syria after spending over 20 years in Canada trying to build a new life for himself.

Inescapable marks Nadda's sixth full-length film in her wide-ranging collection of feature and short films, all of which contain references to Islamic themes and Nadda's own Syrian and Palestinian roots.

== Synopsis ==
Adib Abdel-Kareem was an officer in the Syrian military force before being labeled a traitor and having to flee to Canada. With his wife, two daughters, and a steady job in Toronto, Adib is confident he has put his past behind him. That is until he learns that his eldest daughter Muna has gone missing in Damascus, after taking a secret detour to Syria while on an assignment in Greece. 20 years after he escaped Syria, Adib is forced to return to rescue his daughter from corrupt government agents who wrongly hold her captive on the grounds of espionage. There, he teams up with his former fiancé, Fatima, and Canadian diplomat, Paul, to locate his daughter while evading former colleagues and the secret police. Both a mystery drama and a political thriller, Inescapable is an action-packed film driven by a father’s selfless dedication to his daughter.

== Cast ==
- Alexander Siddig as Adib Abdel-Kareem
- Joshua Jackson as Paul
- Marisa Tomei as Fatima
- Oded Fehr as Sayid Abd Al-Aziz
- Saad Siddiqui as Halim
- Fadia Nadda as Lingerie Sales Girl
- Bonnie Lee Bouman as Emily
- Danny Keogh as Detlev
- Hrant Alianak as Ali Homs
- Jay Anstey as Muna
- Amy Anstey as Leila
- Carl Beukes as Peter
- Rafiq Jajbhay as Sheikh Abu Mouhammad
- Josette Eales as Paul's Wife
- Ializa Knafo as Ali Homs's Daughter
- Candice Smith as Nadia

== Production ==
Inescapable was produced by Daniel Iron and Lance Samuels, and executively produced by Killer Films' Christine Vachon, Myriad's Kirk D'Amico, and Alliance Films' Mark Slone.

=== Casting ===
Marisa Tomei plays Fatima, Adib’s ex-fiancé, who still "smolders with love and bitterness, but also knows that helping him is the right thing to do". After being convinced to forget her planned research trip to Syria, Tomei finds a Syrian woman in Johannesburg to draw influence from and emulates her speech and gestures. Tomei admits that she became very emotionally involved with Fatima’s role and even took some of her pain home, stating: "This film packs a punch, and I am still reeling." Ruba Nadda sold Fatima to Tomei as "feisty" and "outspoken". However, Tomei reveals that "for many reasons she cut those pieces out", including passionate kisses, Adib telling Fatima he never stopped loving her, Fatima rending her clothing in despair, high-pitched curses in Arabic, and so on. She further adds: "And the way I relate to those scenes being cut – in a small way, that's what happens to the women there. The big stuff gets crushed, suppressed. You can still smell it in the film, but you're not allowed to express it. The women there were given an education, then had it taken away; given a voice, then had it taken away. So now I've experienced that to a tiny degree. I feel for our sisters there."

Alexander Siddig plays Adib, a former Syrian militant who believes he has escaped his past until he is compelled to return to Syria to rescue his daughter, Muna. Siddig reveals that he agreed to do Inescapable because he knew it would be compared to popular films such as Frantic, Taken, and Syriana, stating: "Men are often horribly misrepresented on film. We're not as capable as movie characters, and that emasculates us. Those butch men are as untrue as skinny models are to most women." Siddig further explains that: "I needed to not betray the man, the father . . . because when kids dream of what their fathers should be like, it should be someone in the ballpark of a real human being. It's not a moral trip. I just can't compete with Liam Neeson or Harrison Ford."

Nadda praises Siddig's ability to convey intense emotions, stating: "He's just honestly one of the most solid actors I've ever seen in my life, and so I thought if I'm going to blow my career, go down in flames, risk it all, I'm going to risk it all on Alexander". Having been displeased with how the West represents Arab men, through Adib, Nadda hopes to show "the good, the bad, the macho, [and] the vulnerable" all of which we "haven't really seen . . . before . . . within the culture".

Joshua Jackson plays Paul, a Canadian diplomat who has a secret affair with Adib’s daughter, Muna. Paul has an ambiguous nature throughout most of the film as he helps Adib locate Muna, but then plays a more active and instrumental role during the final scenes. When Adib learns about Paul’s relationship with Muna, Paul’s motives finally become more clear. According to Jackson, this is what attracted him to Paul’s character, stating that: "I see a lot of scripts, and even the well-written characters usually go only from here to there . . . Paul gets an entire other direction. He’s boyish in the beginning, then he tries to cover his ass and tries to get away with whatever he can, and then, when the situation spirals out of his control, instead of making a weak or childish choice, he makes a more interesting and difficult one. It’s his passage into manhood."

=== Filming ===
Nadda had hoped to film Inescapable in Jordan. However, after visiting the Middle East, she made "two discoveries: her script would still be heavily censored and her own safety would be in danger". When Nadda, a Canadian born-citizen with a Syrian father and Palestinian mother, met with potential Jordanian partners, she was warned against filming so close to Syria, stating: "All they saw was my Arab name. Because I have a Syrian passport too, they were worried that someone would abduct me and put me on trial in Syria for whatever reason they wanted. I had spent six years trying to convince anyone who would listen that Syria is a dangerous country, and now I'm sitting in a room with paranoid Arab producers who are saying, ‘Are you out of your mind?’"

When Nadda found it was too dangerous to shoot Inescapable in the Middle East, she moved production to Johannesburg". On a modest budget of about $5 million, Inescapable was filmed with a 25-day shooting schedule. This meant that "actors did their own stunts, and each action scene was shot in one take because they couldn't afford to demolish things more than once".

Despite the stressful time constraint, Nadda revealed that the ambience on set was calm and "a stark contrast from what audiences can expect from the Syria-set film . . .It’s just been one of the smoothest film shoots I’ve ever been on. I’m going to be honest, I didn’t expect it but its just been really unbelievable." Nadda further adds that her team has been able to capture "incredible footage" and has even finished "two hours early every single day". According to Nadda, making the movie was a collaborative process; she made sure that everyone was on board with her vision, stating: "if you give oxygen to a film, you take a movie from good to great" because your team will "feel invested" and "part of the process".

== Release ==
Inescapable screened in Berlin and originally premiered in Toronto at the 2012 Toronto International Film Festival on September 11, 2012. Alliance Films distributed the film in Canada, while Myriad Pictures handled the film internationally.

Myriad Pictures granted distribution rights to IFC Films in the U.S., Playarte in Brazil, Joy N Content in South Korea, Voxell in CIS, ZDF in Germany, AtlanticFilm in Scandinavia, Three Lines in Benelux, HBO in Poland, Eagle Entertainment in the Middle East, PT Fresto Pictures in Indonesia, Orlando in Israel, and D Productions in Turkey.

=== Critical reception ===
The film received negative reviews by critics. It holds a 19% rating on Rotten Tomatoes based on 21 reviews and reports a rating average of 4.2 out of 10 At Metacritic, which assigns a weighted average score out of 100 to reviews from mainstream critics, the film received an average score of 37 based on 11 reviews, indicating "generally unfavorable reviews".

Jeannette Catsoulis of The New York Times gave Inescapable a generally negative review, describing the film as a "Canadian nonthriller that plays like a heavily sedated hybrid of Taken and Not Without my Daughter" that is "plagued by clunky action sequences and a porous plot". Catsoulis suggests that, had Nadda "focused less on espionage and more on inconveniently rekindled passion, her film might have found richer, more rewarding soil to till".

Rick Groen of The Globe and Mail gave Inescapable a mixed review. He praises Nadda as a "solid actors’ director" and describes the acting in the film as "competent even when the writing isn’t". However, he criticizes Nadda for failing to capture the true political climate in Syria, calling the film "soft fiction" that "pales before the hard facts". He further adds that Johannesburg "does a poor job mimicking Damascus, a shortcoming that the camera’s tight shots can’t disguise". Despite his criticisms, Groen admits that he did not "once try to escape from Inescapable".

Alissa Simon of Variety, gave Inescapable a generally negative review, writing: "After middlebrow romance Cairo Time, Canadian helmer-writer Ruba Nadda returns to a Middle Eastern setting to try her hand at political thriller Inescapable; the results do not impress. This heavy-handed, shrilly melodramatic tale about a former Syrian military intelligence officer who returns to his homeland when his daughter goes missing reps a misfire on every level. Poor word of mouth is unavoidable, and will likely dampen the curiosity of even those with a current affairs interest in Syria, although casting of Alexander Siddig and Marisa Tomei might spark some interest in ancillary".

Melissa Leong of the Ottawa Citizen gave Inescapable a mixed review calling it "a very different kind of action-thriller". She commends Alexander Siddig for being "charismatic and believable as a tortured man searching for his lost child". She also praises Marisa Tomei for being "absolutely magnetic as the spurned lover who is forced to help Adib navigate the streets". Although she found both Siddig and Tomei’s performances striking, she contends that the film fails to be "tense" with "fast adventure". Instead, she describes the film as "a slow ride through a treacherous land".
