= Shadows in the Sun =

Shadows in the Sun may refer to:

- Shadows in the Sun (2005 film), a television film
- Shadows in the Sun (2009 film), a British independent film
