= October Gale (film) =

2014 film

- Film poster
- Directed by: Ruba Nadda
- Written by: Ruba Nadda
- Produced by: Daniel Iron
- Starring: Patricia Clarkson; Scott Speedman; Tim Roth
- Cinematography: Jeremy Benning
- Edited by: Wiebke von Carolsfeld
- Music by: Mischa Chillak
- Release date: September 11, 2014 (TIFF)
- Running time: 91 minutes
- Country: Canada
- Language: English

October Gale is a Canadian thriller film written and directed by Ruba Nadda. The film premiered at the 2014 Toronto International Film Festival in the Special Presentations section of the festival. It was acquired by IFC Films and received a release in March 2015. The film stars Patricia Clarkson, Scott Speedman, and Tim Roth. Clarkson had previously worked with Nadda on Cairo Time.

== Plot ==
Helen Matthews (Patricia Clarkson), is a widow still grieving the untimely death of her husband, James (Callum Keith Rennie). Against the wishes of her son, Helen insists on going to the boat access island cottage she and her husband used as a vacation home. Early the next morning, Helen leaves the cabin's dock, travelling up Georgian Bay to get groceries. After several miles, her boat’s engine fails. Helen calls marine staff on her radio, and they agree to repair her boat's engine in a few days, dropping her back at her dock.

On her second night in the cabin, she is awakened by the sound of thunder. When she goes to investigate, she finds a strange skiff tied up at her pier. There is a puddle of blood on the rear seat of the boat. Upon her return to the cabin, she finds blood on her cabin's door handle and a stranger named Will (Scott Speedman), who has been shot in the shoulder and has crawled into her home looking for help.

Helen, a doctor, performs surgery on the stranger's shoulder, removing a pistol round, then tends to his wound, saving his life. The following day she tries to learn who shot Will, the stranger, but he refuses to tell her and insists on departing. However, he is too weak to leave and Helen allows him to return to the house.

Later Al, a local handyman, comes by the cabin to enquire about odd job work. Al, it turns out, has spotted the boat Will had stolen. Will warns her not to let the man in the house as he will kill both of them but Helen, ignoring him, asks Al to tow both her and Will to shore. Al agrees, but instead unties both Helen and Will's boats from her dock and then departs. In an attempt to stop the boats from drifting off Helen dives into the water and nearly drowns before Will enters the water to save her. The next scene shows Will un-dressing Helen down to her underwear, and preparing a shower for her. Once out of the shower, Helen and Will share a kiss.

Will eventually reveals that he accidentally killed a man in a bar fight and, despite serving time, the father of the man he killed is pursuing him and won't stop until he's dead. Helen meanwhile reveals that her husband died the previous year in October after being caught in a storm.

Helen decides to try to help Will survive. They scour her home for bullets for the rifle and remove the dock from her home. Meanwhile, Al returns with Tom and after searching the house unsuccessfully, they hunt for Helen and Will in the woods where the two have split up and are trying to hide. Helen tries to assault Tom by hitting him in the shoulder, but is unsuccessful. Instead, Tom punches her in the nose, taking away her rifle, returning her to the cabin. Tom tells her that Will was his adopted son, which he raised to look after his own biological son. Will killed his son because his son had attacked a woman, though Tom denied this. When Al bursts back into the cabin, complaining that Tom needed to help him search for Will in the woods, Tom suddenly shoots Al, believing that the shot will lure Will back to the cottage.

After hearing the gunshot and fearing for Helen's life, Will does return to the house. Will and Tom speak softly of their regrets and share an intimate father and son hug on the porch. Inside the house, Helen remembers that when she and Tom had returned to the house having already had her rifle taken from her, Tom had ejected the cartridge that was in the rifle's chamber onto the floor. Tom then had put the rifles cartridge clip into his pocket, believing that he had disarmed her. Helen found the cartridge on the floor and managed to load the rifle. After Will apologizes, Tom lifts his gun with the intent of murdering Will. Suddenly Helen fires the single round killing Tom before he can hurt Will.

The following day in town after going to the police, Helen sees what she thinks is her dead Husband James. Only after speaking to him for a moment does she realize it is Will. He asks her to leave with him. The film ends with Helen contemplating either a return to Toronto and to her normal life or accepting Will’s offer.

== Cast ==
- Patricia Clarkson as Helen Matthews
- Scott Speedman as William
- Tim Roth as Tom
- Aidan Devine as Al Tessier
- Eric Murdoch as Henry
- Callum Keith Rennie as James Matthews
- Billy MacLellan as Ed, The Marina Guy
- Dani Kind as Wait Staff

== Production ==
October Gale was shot in and around the Georgian Bay. Filming took place in the spring after one of the coldest recorded winters and according to Nadda the ice did not melt until two days before they began shooting on the water.

== Reception ==
Rotten Tomatoes, a review aggregator, reports that 19% of 27 surveyed critics gave the film a positive review; the average rating is 5.3/10. Metacritic rated it 48/100 based on 10 reviews. Variety gave it a mixed review in which they called it "a tepid, underdeveloped thriller". The Hollywood Reporter criticized the script for resulting in a "fairly silly film".
