= Ruba Nadda =

Canadian film director (born 1972)

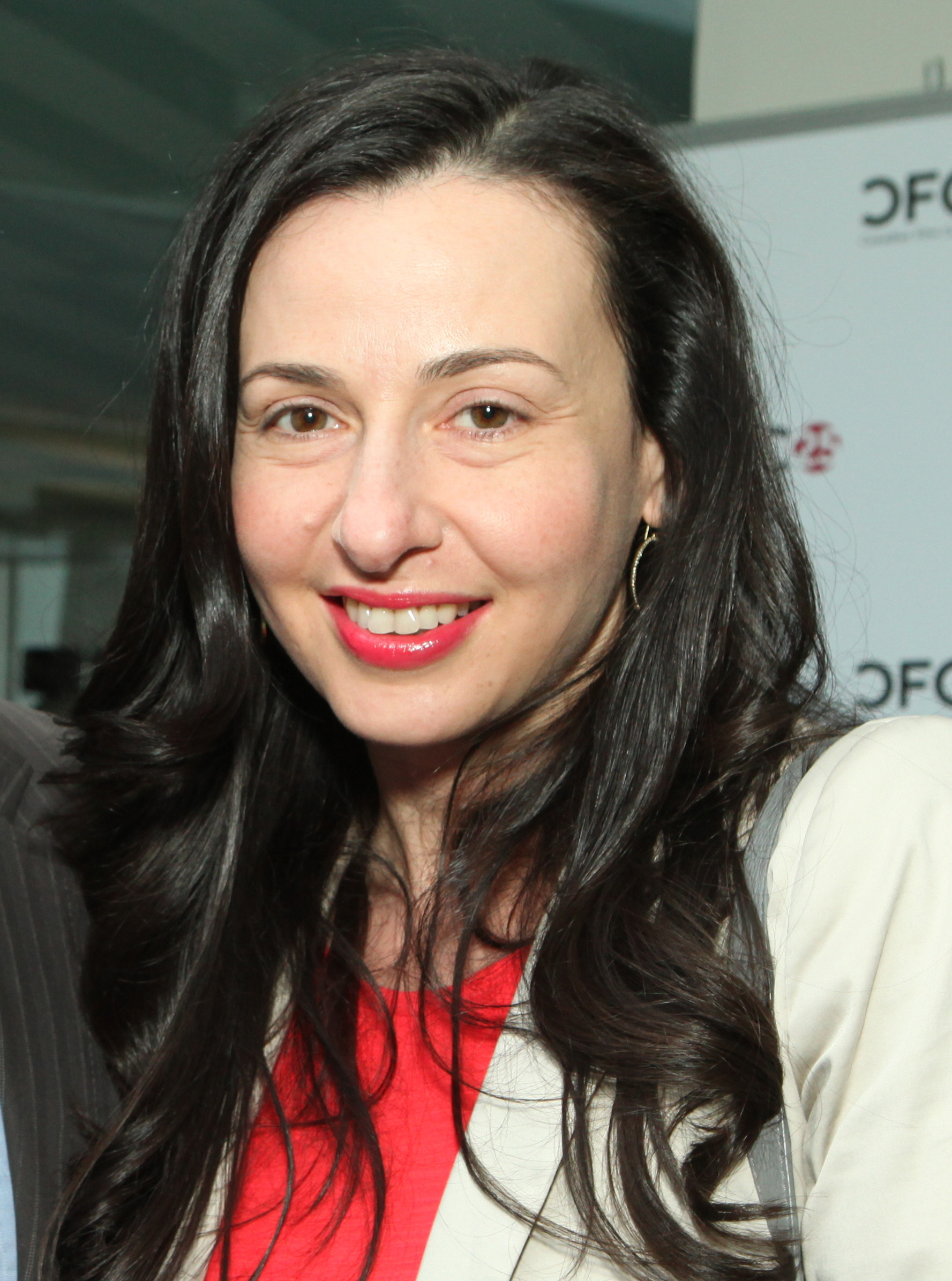
- Born: 6 December 1972 (age 53); Montreal, Quebec, Canada
- Occupations: film director, screenwriter, cinematographer, producer, & film editor
- Years active: 1997–present

Ruba Nadda (born 6 December 1972) is a Canadian film director. She made several award-winning short films, including Lost Woman Story, Interstate Love Story, So Far Gone and Damascus Nights before writing and directing features I Always Come to You, Unsettled and Sabah. Her movie Cairo Time won the Best Canadian Feature Film award at the 2009 Toronto International Film Festival and was Best Reviewed Romance on Rotten Tomatoes for 2010. She is known for shooting feature films in very short time spans.

== Early life and education ==
Nadda was born to a Syrian father and a Palestinian mother.

Nadda studied literature at York University in Toronto, Ontario. She went on to study Film Production at NYU's Tisch School of the Arts and completed a six-week course there.

== Directing career ==
Nadda made her feature film debut with Sabah starring actress Arsinée Khanjian in the title role.

Her next film Cairo Time, starring Patricia Clarkson and Alexander Siddig, was released in 2009 and won Best Canadian Feature Film at the 2009 Toronto International Film Festival.

In 2012 Nadda reunited with her Cairo Time star Siddig to film Inescapable, a thriller which also featured Marisa Tomei and Joshua Jackson.

Nadda released her next film October Gale in 2014. The film, a thriller set in Georgian Bay, would reunite her with her Cairo Time star Patricia Clarkson. The film premiered at the 2014 Toronto International Film Festival.

In September 2014 Nadda announced that she would be reuniting with Patricia Clarkson on a TV series for HBO titled Elisabeth.

== Personal life ==
In September 2014 Nadda announced that she was seven months pregnant.

== Filmography ==
=== Films ===
- 1997
  - Wet Heat Drifts Through the Afternoon
  - Interstate Love Story
  - Do Nothing
- 1998
  - The Wind Blows Towards Me Particularly
  - So Far Gone
  - Damascus Nights
- 1999
  - Slut
  - Laila
- 2000
  - I Always Come to You
  - Blue Turning Grey Over You
  - Black September
  - I Would Suffer Cold Hands for You
- 2001
  - Unsettled
- 2004
  - Aadan
- 2005
  - Sabah
- 2009
  - Cairo Time
- 2012
  - Inescapable
- 2015
  - October Gale

=== Television ===
- 2016-2017
  - Killjoys
- 2016
  - This Life
- 2017-2018
  - NCIS: Los Angeles
- 2017-2019
  - Frankie Drake Mysteries
- 2017
  - Valor
- 2018
  - Hawaii Five-O
  - Taken
- 2019
  - Arrow
  - Roswell, New Mexico
  - The InBetween
  - Krypton
- 2020
  - Lincoln Rhyme: Hunt for the Bone Collector
- 2021
  - Murdoch Mysteries
  - Hudson & Rex (S3E3, Into the Wild)
- 2022
  - Queens (S1E12, Let the Past Be Past)
  - Riverdale

(S6E13, Chapter One Hundred and Eight: Ex-Libris)

  - Tom Swift (S1E8, ...And the Book of Isaac)
  - Big Shot (S2E4, 17 Candles)
- 2023
  - Magnum P.I
  - Alaska Daily (S1E8, "Tell a Reporter Not to Do Something and Suddenly It's a Party")
  - Gray
- 2024
  - So Help Me Todd (S2E8. "P.I.'s Wide Shut")

== Awards ==
- 2009: Won Best Canadian Feature Film award at the 2009 Toronto International Film Festival for Cairo Time
- 2010: Best Reviewed Romance on Rotten Tomatoes for 2010 for Cairo Time
