= Mona Hala =

Egyptian actress and hostess (born 1985)

- Born: 25 October 1984 (age 42); Egypt
- Education: Ain Shams University
- Occupations: Actress, hostess, YouTube blogger, activist
- Years active: 2001–present
- Spouse: Tomas (m. 2018)

Mona Hala (Arabic: منى هلا; born on 25 October 1984) is an Egyptian-Austrian actress and hostess.

== Early life and career ==
She was born in Egypt to an Austrian father and an Egyptian mother. Her father died when she was 12. She stayed with her mother in Egypt but maintained Austrian citizenship. She graduated from Ain Shams University with a degree in German-Arabic translations. She began her career as a TV Children Shows host. Her first role in acting was in Lucky guys series in 2001, then she appeared in TV series The Imperator with Hussein Fahmi and Ilham Chahine, she acted Fawzia Fuad of Egypt in King Farouq in 2008 and in A queen in exile in 2010. Her movies include Seb wana seeb in 2004, Zaki shan in 2005, Seven colors of sky in 2007, By nature colors in 2009, The Glimpse in 2009, and Radio Love in 2011.

== Personal life and politics ==
Mona Hala is known as one of the celebrities who participated in the Egyptian revolution of 2011. She is known for her leftist Ideas, she is a feminist and a socialist, she also defends gay rights.

In 2018 she married her longtime American boyfriend Tomas. He converted to Islam for marriage purposes, and she became vegan after meeting him.

== Works ==
=== Series ===
- Lucky guys in 2001
- The imperator in 2002
- Shabab online 2 in 2003
- The other side of beach in 2004
- New Egypt in 2004
- Tamea Caviar in 2005
- Cairo welcome you in 2006
- Mowaten bedarajat wazeer in 2006
- Heaven victory in 2006
- El-Andaleeb in 2006
- And The love is strongest in 2006
- Seket eli yeroh in 2006
- Wounded hearts club in 2007
- King Farouq in 2007
- Girls in thirty in 2008
- Ada Alnahar in 2008
- Dead heart in 2008
- Days of horor and love in 2008
- Lamba show in 2008
- The hearts is back in 2008
- The high school in 2009
- Haramt ya baba in 2009
- Love story in 2010
- The truth of illusions in 2010
- quarter problem in 2010
- Leaving with sun in 2010
- Haramt ya baba 2 in 2010
- A queen in exile in 2010
- The other october in 2010
- Years of love and salt in 2010
- The university in 2011
- Aroset yaho in 2012
- Robe mashakel spacy in 2012
- Teery ya tayara in 2012
- Alf salama in 2013
- The best days in 2013

=== Films ===
- Albasha Altelmed in 2004
- Seeb wana seeb in 2004
- Zaki shan in 2005
- Seven colors of sky in 2007
- The Baby Doll Night in 2008
- Cairo Time in 2009
- The Glimpse in 2009
- In nature colors in 2009
- Radio love in 2011
- The Field in 2011
- Midnight party in 2012
- Paparazzi in 2015
- Hamam sakhen in 2018
- Exterior night in 2018

=== Short movies ===
- Jahin quarters in 2004
- Close up in 2005
- House from meat 2005
- Akbar Alkabaer in 2007

=== Stage ===
- The accident which happened in 2010

=== Hosting ===
- Yala bena in 2001
- Sah sah maana in 2001
- Belmaqloob in 2010
- Monatoy in 2011
