= Michael Birkett, 2nd Baron Birkett =

British film producer and director, author, and aristocrat (1929–2015)

Michael Birkett, 2nd Baron Birkett (22 October 1929 – 3 April 2015) was a British film producer/director, author and hereditary peer.

== Early life and education ==
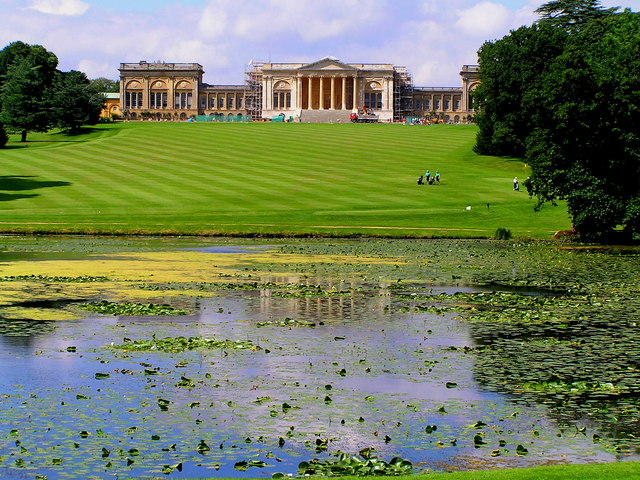
Stowe School, Buckinghamshire

Michael Birkett was the only son of Norman, 1st Baron Birkett by his wife, Ruth (née Nilsson). Birkett attended Stowe before going up to Trinity College, Cambridge, where he completed an MA.

== Succession ==
On 10 February 1962, Michael Birkett succeeded his father as the 2nd Baron Birkett, a UK Peerage title created in 1958.

== Career ==
=== Film productions ===
Birkett produced Some People (1962) and Harold Pinter's The Caretaker (1963), starring Alan Bates, Donald Pleasence and Robert Shaw, both directed by Clive Donner. Later production credits include Sir Peter Hall's 1969 film A Midsummer Night's Dream and Peter Brook's pictures Marat/Sade (1967) and King Lear (1971), starring Paul Scofield. He was also executive producer of three episodes of Brook's television mini-series The Mahabharata (1989).

=== Writing ===
He was the author of The Story of the Ring, a retelling of Wagner's operatic epic, published in 2009.

=== Public service and appointments ===
Birkett served as Deputy Director of The National Theatre between 1975 and 1977 (under Sir Peter Hall), and was subsequently engaged as a consultant and later appointed Director for Recreation and Arts at the Greater London Council (from 1979 until its abolition in 1986). He was executive director of the Royal Philharmonic Society, chairman of BAFTA, and head of numerous other arts bodies. He also served as the chairman of Governors of the BRIT School for Performing Arts and Technology (1990–2001), and chairman of the Donatella Flick Conducting Competition (1990–2008).

A Freeman of the City of London, Birkett was admitted a liveryman of the Worshipful Company of Curriers, later serving as Master Currier (1975–76).

=== House of Lords ===
Having succeeded as Baron Birkett in 1962, he later took his seat on the Crossbenches of the Upper House. There, he was a leading proponent of a national lottery to provide extra funding for the Arts and proposed the idea in a speech before the House of Lords in 1988. Two years later he and Denis Vaughan formed the Lottery Promotion Company, solely advocating for legislation to establish a not-for-profit, privately run lottery, a proposal eventually adopted under Prime Minister John Major in 1994.

== Family ==
On 13 October 1960, Birkett married Mrs Junia Crawford (née Elliott); Lady Birkett died in 1973. In 1978 he married Gloria Taylor, daughter of Thomas Taylor, an industrialist, and they had a son, Thomas Birkett (born 25 July 1982). Gloria, Lady Birkett (mother, by a previous marriage, of the actor Alexander Siddig), died on 10 February 2001.

=== Death and succession ===
Michael Birkett, 2nd Baron Birkett, died in 2015 (aged 85), at which time the family title devolved upon the 3rd and present baron, his only child and heir, Thomas Birkett, 3rd Baron Birkett, a cinematographer.

=== Arms ===
Coat of arms of Baron Birkett
Notes Granted by Sir Algar Howard, Garter King of Arms (College of Arms, 1958) Crest Between two wings gules a Viking ship proper charged on the sail with a raven close sable. Escutcheon Gules three full bottomed wigs argent. Supporters Dexter, a lion or semee of roses gules; Sinister, a wolf sable semee of mullets gold. Motto Lex mea lux (The law is my light).

Peerage of the United Kingdom
Preceded by Norman Birkett	Baron Birkett; 1962–2015	Succeeded by Thomas Birkett
