= Sabah (film) =

- Directed by: Ruba Nadda
- Written by: Ruba Nadda
- Produced by: Tracey Boulton; Atom Egoyan; Simone Urdl
- Starring: Arsinée Khanjian; Shawn Doyle; Jeff Seymour; Kathryn Winslow
- Cinematography: Luc Montpellier
- Edited by: Teresa Hannigan
- Distributed by: Mongrel Media
- Release date: 2005
- Language: English

Sabah (Arabic: صباح, Translation "Morning") is a 2005 film directed by Ruba Nadda and starring Arsinée Khanjian as Sabah, a traditional Muslim woman living in Toronto. She falls in love with Stephen, a non-Muslim Canadian man (played by Shawn Doyle). The film had the alternate title Coldwater.

== Plot ==
Sabah is a 40-year-old single immigrant from Syria living in Toronto with her family. She is responsible for her mother's well-being. Since her father's death, her brother Majid has been the family authority figure.

Her niece, Souhaire, does not want him choosing her husband. His marriage is rocky, and he insists on tradition. Sabah decides to start swimming again; an activity not allowed by Majid. At a city swimming pool she meets Stephen; they are attracted to each other. Because he is not a Muslim, Sabah hides their friendship from her family.

With passage of time, their relationship gets deep and at one point they share a kiss. Sabah's niece teaches her belly dancing which Sabah enjoys. One day, while visiting Stephen at his carpenter workshop, she decides to stay overnight with him. Informing her mother that she will not be back that night, she dances and the two have sexual intercourse.

The next day, as she returns home, she faces her mother, brother, sister, sister-in-law and niece who are anxiously waiting for her. After some hesitation, she tells them the truth about her doings in the last few months. Majid responds by announcing that Sabah is no longer a part of the family, as Muslim traditions forbid marriage for Muslim women to non-Muslims. Sabah leaves and Majid decides to take care of their mother.

At Stephen's workshop, Sabah is met by her mother, sister and sister-in-law who insist that she speak to Majid. Majid tells her that the money their father left had run out eight years ago and he is supporting the family himself. Eventually both agree that the family must change. The women of the family are impressed by Stephen and his deep blue eyes.

The film ends with a feast at Sabah's family home. Stephen is mingling with his in-laws and everyone is having a good time.

== Cast ==
- Arsinée Khanjian as Sabah. Nadda stated that she asked Khanjian to perform the role because Khanjian was the only actress Nadda envisioned in the role of Sabah and because Nadda enjoyed Khanjian's work. As the film progresses, Sabah shows more confidence and begins loosening her manner of dress by showing more hair and wearing red clothing. At the end of the film, even though the family dynamic has changed, Sabah continues to be a hijabi.
- Shawn Doyle as Stephen Montpellier. Stephen, a White Canadian, is a carpenter from Sudbury, Ontario, who makes wooden crosses that he sells to churches. He is an atheist. Khanjian suggested using Doyle as the actor to portray Stephen. Young stated that Stephen's "natural reactions to the surprises in their relationship make him a measuring stick for [Sabah's] family's off-centeredness".
- Jeff Seymour as Majid, Sabah's brother. Young stated that the "macho posturing" of Majid personifies the "harsh, conservative side of Islam". Shira Tarrant of Men Speak Out: Views on Gender, Sex, and Power noted that the viewer's perception of Majid changes as time goes on in the film since his vulnerabilities are revealed.
- Fadia Nadda as Souhaire, Sabah's teenage niece. Souhaire acts as Sabah's mentor even though she is younger than Sabah. She refuses to take an arranged marriage with a man, but she later falls in love with the said man. Young describes her dismissal of an arranged marriage as a "breakaway" element within Islamic culture, and she described the sudden infatuation with the suitor as "more amusing than real".
- Setta Keshishian as Umm Mouhammed, Sabah's mother
- Kathryn Winslow as Amal, Majid's wife who has an affair with her Arabic teacher.
- David Alpay as Mustafa, Souhaire's eventual boyfriend. She initially refuses an arranged marriage to him, but the two later fall in love after they meet at a nightclub.
- Roula Said as Shaheera, Sabah's sister and Souhaire's mother.
- Mary Lou Fallis as Opera Singer
- Kaylen Christensen as Girlfriend
- Aaron Abrams as Paramedic

== Development ==
Ruba Nadda stated that she got the inspiration to make the film while she was a student at York University; she observed a veiled Muslim woman on a public bus and wondered how she would have dealt with her sexual feelings, and then, how she would have managed affairs if she became infatuated with a non-Muslim man. Nadda had the concept of a "very western looking man" and a woman wearing a hijab kissing "in the middle of the street." As the idea gestated, Nadda decided to use an older woman as the protagonist since such a character is limited by the already set-in-stone household roles and because such a woman may feel that a forbidden relationship would be her final chance for love; Nadda reasoned that the fear may tempt the woman into having an illicit affair.

Telefilm provided funding for the film, and Nadda enlisted the support of Atom Egoyan and Simone Urdl; the two became the film's executive producers in April 2002 after approving the script. Nadda spent two months in New York City to study film production.

According to Fadia Nadda, in the initial draft Stephen rescues Sabah during their first meeting; Fadia Nadda argued that having them meet in a more mundane manner was more realistic.

Sabah was filmed in Toronto over a three-week period during the summer; a heat wave occurred during the filming. Nadda stated that she wanted to portray Toronto as being a beautiful city, contrasting with a gritty depiction found in other works. Luc Montpellier served as the film's lenser. Deborah Young of Variety stated that the film has "an attractive, brightly colored look." Nadda intentionally omitted any references to the Israeli–Palestinian conflict, the September 11, 2001 attacks, other acts of terrorism, and any resulting sentiment and actions against Arab Canadians.

Each shot had the colour blue, with red and green also present in smaller amounts; the visuals received inspiration from paintings by Sir Frank Dicksee, Jean-Léon Gérôme, and Edward Hopper. The film uses water as a symbolism for rebirth and charting unknown territory.

== Reception ==
In 2006, for her role in this film, Khanjian was nominated for "best actress" as part of the 2006 Genie Awards.

Deborah Young in a review for Variety stated that Sabah's family previously had "drawn" a "hard line" so the "[T]urnaround ending, though comically inevitable, seems dramatically forced".

Stephen Cole of The Globe and Mail gave the film three stars and stated that the film was "something special"; Cole argued that the side stories take too much time and that the conflict with Majid was not as dramatic as it was intended.

Steve Erickson of Gay City News argued that the film's premise of "multi-cultural bliss" "feels mighty hollow" since this is "a world where tribal and ethnic tensions aren’t going away any time soon".
