= Harewood Downs Golf Club =

Golf club in Buckinghamshire, England

- Location within Buckinghamshire
- 51.65146°N 0.57680°W

Club information
- Location: Harewood, Buckinghamshire, England
- Established: 1907
- Tota holes: 18

Harewood Downs Golf Club is a golf club, located circa 2.5 miles (4.0 km) south-east of Amersham, Buckinghamshire, England. It is located northwest of Chalfont Saint Giles and southeast of Amersham. It was established in 1907. Lord Birkett, noted for being the judge who presided over the Sir Oswald Mosley trial during World War II, was a member of the club.
