= Baron Birkett =

Barony in the Peerage of the United Kingdom

Baron Birkett, of Ulverston in the County Palatine of Lancaster, is a hereditary title in the Peerage of the United Kingdom. It was created on 31 January 1958 for the prominent lawyer Sir Norman Birkett. He was one of the British judges at the Nuremberg Trials who later served as a Lord Justice of Appeal before becoming a Law Lord.

On 3 April 2015, the title devolved upon Norman Birkett's grandson who became the third Baron, succeeding his father.

== Barons Birkett (1958) ==
- William Norman Birkett, 1st Baron Birkett (1883–1962)
- Michael Birkett, 2nd Baron Birkett (1929–2015)
- Thomas Birkett, 3rd Baron Birkett (b. 1982)

There is no heir to the title.

== Arms ==
Coat of arms of Baron Birkett
Notes Granted by Sir Algar Howard, Garter King of Arms (College of Arms, 1958) Crest Between two wings gules a Viking ship proper charged on the sail with a raven close sable. Escutcheon Gules three full bottomed wigs argent. Supporters Dexter, a lion or semee of roses gules; Sinister, a wolf sable semee of mullets gold. Motto Lex mea lux (The law is my light).
