= Alexander Siddig =

British actor (born 1965)

The Honourable Alexander Siddig
- ألكسندر صديق
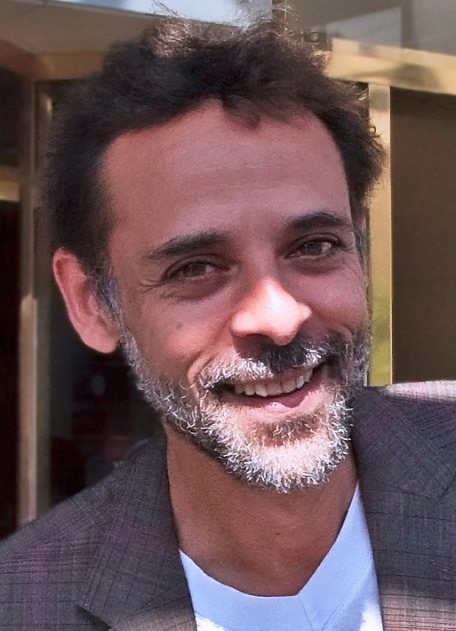
- Siddig at the 2009 Toronto International Film Festival
- Born: Siddig el-Tahir el-Fadil el-Siddig Abdurrahman Mohammed Ahmed Abdel Karim el-Mahdi صدّيق الطاهر الفاضل الصدّيق عبدالرحمن محمد أحمد عبدالكريم المهدي; 21 November 1965 (age 61); Omdurman, Khartoum, Republic of Sudan
- Other name: Siddig el-Fadil
- Education: London Academy of Music and Dramatic Art
- Occupations: Actor; director
- Years active: 1987–present
- Spouses: Nana Visitor (m. 1997; div. 2001) Shana Collier (m. 2015)
- Children: 1
- Relatives: Michael Birkett (adoptive father); Thomas Birkett, 3rd Baron Birkett (half-brother); Charlie McDowell (cousin); Malcolm McDowell (uncle); Sadiq al-Mahdi (uncle); Hussein Shariffe (uncle); Muhammad Ahmad (great-great-grandfather)
- Website: www.sidcity.net

Siddig el-Fadil (born 21 November 1965), known professionally as Alexander Siddig, is a Sudanese-born British actor and director. Siddig is best known for his roles as Dr. Julian Bashir in the television series Star Trek: Deep Space Nine, former terrorist Hamri Al-Assad in the sixth season of the series 24, Doran Martell in Game of Thrones, Ra's al Ghul in Gotham, and Philip Burton in Primeval. He also starred in the films Syriana (2005), Hannibal (2006), A Lost Man (2007), Cairo Time (2009), and Inescapable (2012).

== Early life ==
Siddig el-Tahir el-Fadil el-Siddig Abdurrahman Mohammed Ahmed Abdel Karim el-Mahdi (Arabic: صدّيق الطاهر الفاضل الصدّيق عبدالرحمن محمد أحمد عبدالكريم المهدي, romanized: Ṣiddīq aṭ-Ṭāhir al-Fāḍil aṣ-Ṣiddīq ʿAbd ar-Raḥman Muḥammad ʾAḥmad ʿAbd al-Karīm al-Mahdī) was born on 21 November 1965 in Omdurman, Republic of Sudan (present-day, Sudan) to a Sudanese father, Tahir El Mahdi, and Gloria Birkett (née Taylor; d. 2001), an English model and theatrical press agent.

Through his father, Siddig is the nephew to Sadiq al-Mahdi, Prime Minister of Sudan during 1966–1967 and 1986–1989, and the filmmaker, poet and painter Hussein Shariffe. Siddig is the great-great-grandson of Muhammad Ahmad, a Nubian religious leader and founder of the Mahdist State who was proclaimed the Mahdi by his disciples. Through his mother, Siddig is the nephew of actor Malcolm McDowell and cousin of film director and screenwriter Charlie McDowell.

Siddig's parents met in the 1960s when his mother travelled to Sudan with a friend, who introduced her to Siddig's father. Initially living in Sudan, in 1967 the family relocated to London. Siddig initially spoke Arabic when he was a child, but by his second year of living in Britain, he had forgotten much of it. On the subject of his childhood, he stated in 2024, "I had a tough time at school and in my teens because being not-white in the UK during the 70s was prickly and you had to sort of negotiate that. I tried to push it aside, my race and my heritage … I would have had to go out of my way to be ethnic." In 1978, Siddig's mother married film director and producer Michael Birkett, who adopted Siddig. Thomas Birkett (b. 1982) is Siddig's half-brother.

Siddig attended St Lawrence College, Ramsgate. He also studied geography and anthropology for a year at University College London before enrolling at the London Academy of Music and Dramatic Art (LAMDA).

== Career ==
Siddig's first acting role was at the age of 14 in a non-speaking role, playing King Tut in a BBC children's production. After leaving LAMDA, Siddig worked in theatre as both an actor and director. Siddig's first television role was a Palestinian man in a British six-part miniseries called The Big Battalions (filmed in 1989 but released in 1992), and shortly afterward, he won the role of Prince Feisal in A Dangerous Man: Lawrence After Arabia, a 1990 telefilm sequel to Lawrence of Arabia starring Ralph Fiennes.

Siddig's role in A Dangerous Man: Lawrence After Arabia brought him to the attention of Rick Berman, executive producer of Star Trek: Deep Space Nine (1993). Berman originally considered Siddig for the role of Commander Benjamin Sisko, but decided in the end that Siddig was too young for the role and cast him as Dr. Julian Bashir. Siddig remained with Deep Space Nine for all seven seasons of the series. He also directed the episodes "Business as Usual" (1997) and "Profit and Lace" (1998). In 1995, Siddig also changed his stage name from Siddig El Fadil to Alexander Siddig.

After the completion of Deep Space Nine in 1999, Siddig began directing a film about the Soviet Night Witches. The film was never completed. Siddig told Bidoun magazine that demand for Islamic and Arabic character roles was increasing in both film and television after the September 11 attacks and that people began to approach him with projects within six months of the event. He played a mountain guide in the thriller film Vertical Limit (2000), starring Chris O'Donnell, and Ajay in the postapocalyptic science-fantasy film Reign of Fire (2002) starring Christian Bale. In 2003, Siddig played the role of an Algerian secret agent on the trail of Islamists in the controversial episode "Nest of Angels" of the British television show Spooks (known as MI-5 in the US). Siddig appeared in a cameo role as Khalid Sheikh Mohammed in the film The Hamburg Cell that premiered the following year.

In 2005, Siddig returned to the live stage, playing the role of Doctor Scott in a production of Whose Life Is It Anyway? starring Kim Cattrall that played at the Comedy Theatre in London. That same year, Siddig appeared as Saladin's aide Imad in Ridley Scott's 2005 film Kingdom of Heaven, and starred alongside George Clooney and Matt Damon as Prince Nasir in the film Syriana.

Siddig played the title role in the BBC's 2006 telefilm Hannibal. In 2007, he starred in A Lost Man (French title Un Homme Perdu) a French-language film that screened at the Cannes Film Festival. That same year, he played the role of former terrorist Hamri Al-Assad in the sixth season of 24.

In 2009, he co-starred with Patricia Clarkson in the film Cairo Time as Tareq Khalifa, an Egyptian who battles his attraction to his friend's wife. Directed by Canadian director Ruba Nadda, the film won the prize for "Best Canadian Feature Film" at the 2009 Toronto International Film Festival. He also played Jamal in Julian Schnabel’s 2010 film Miral.

Siddig played Philip Burton in series four and five of the ITV science-fiction drama programme Primeval; both series aired in 2011. In 2012, Siddig again worked with director Nadda and played the starring role as a Syrian-Canadian businessman in the film Inescapable, which also starred Marisa Tomei and Joshua Jackson.

In 2013, Siddig narrated the BBC Two nature documentary series Wild Arabia and played the role of Minos in the first series of the BBC fantasy-adventure programme Atlantis.

From 2013 to 2015, Siddig played Aslan Al-Rahim ("the Turk") in the BBC historical fantasy drama series Da Vinci's Demons. In 2015 and 2016, he appeared in the HBO series Game of Thrones; Siddig played the role of Doran Martell, the ruling Prince of Dorne, in the series' fifth and sixth seasons. He also played Reuben Oliver, an artist and suitor of Polly Shelby, in the third season of the British series Peaky Blinders. Siddig also provided the voice of Wolf, a character in the historical fantasy drama Tumanbay that aired on BBC Radio 4 between December 2015 and February 2016.

In 2017, Siddig joined the cast of the televisions series Gotham as League of Shadows leader Ra’s al Ghul and also played the part of Aristotle Onassis in the drama miniseries The Kennedys: After Camelot.

In 2019, he appeared in the Netflix series The Spy as Ahmed Suidani, a Syrian security officer. That same year, he appeared as Issouf Al Moctar in the second season of the Fox (UK and Ireland) thriller series Deep State, and voiced Avi Singh in Star Wars: The Bad Batch.

== Personal life ==
Siddig began a relationship with Nana Visitor whilst working on the set of Star Trek: Deep Space Nine. Their son, Django El Tahir El Siddig, was born on 16 September 1996 and Visitor's pregnancy was written into the storyline of Deep Space Nine. Django is Siddig's first child and Visitor's second son. The couple married in 1997 and divorced in 2001.

Siddig met his second wife, Shana Collier, while filming Cairo Time, for which she was an assistant producer; the couple married in 2015.

Siddig stated he was neither Christian nor Muslim in a 2001 letter to his fanclub, but in a 2004 letter described himself as having "quite recently (after nearly 40 years) discovered that he was Muslim".

In an April 2024 interview, Siddig described his sexuality as "not quite straight". He has described his hobbies as cooking, woodworking, gardening and computer games.

While filming Deep Space Nine he resided in Los Angeles; afterwards he relocated to New York City with his family. As of 2018, he resides in Massachusetts with his wife.

== Filmography ==
=== Film ===
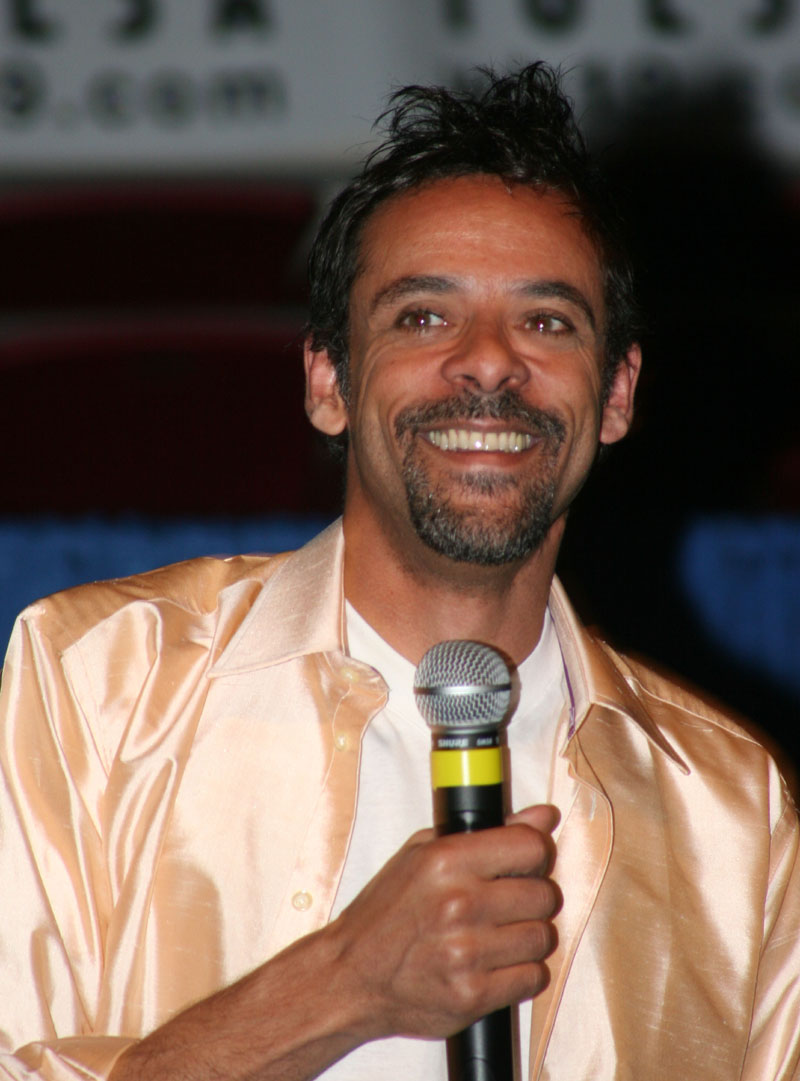
At TrekExpo in Tulsa, Oklahoma, in 2005

Year	Film	Role	Notes
1987	Sammy and Rosie Get Laid	Partygoer	
1992	A Dangerous Man: Lawrence After Arabia	Emir Faisal I	TV film
2000	Vertical Limit	Kareem Nazir	
2002	Reign of Fire	Ajay	
2004	The Hamburg Cell	Khalid Sheikh Mohammed	TV film
2005	Kingdom of Heaven	Imad ad-Din al-Isfahani	
2005	Syriana	Prince Nasir Al-Subaai	
2006	Hannibal	Hannibal	TV movie
2007	The Nativity Story	Angel Gabriel	
2007	The Last Legion	Theodorus Andronikus	
2008	A Lost Man	Fouad Saleh	
2008	Doomsday	Hatcher	
2008	Espion(s)	Malik	
2009	Cairo Time	Tareq Khalifa	
2010	Miral	Jamal	
2010	4.3.2.1.	Robert	
2010	Clash of the Titans	Hermes	
2012	Inescapable	Adib Abdel-Kareem	
2013	The Fifth Estate	Dr. Tarek Haliseh	
2013	May in the Summer	Ziad	
2017	Submergence	Dr. Shadid	
2019	21 Bridges	Adi	
2020	Skylines	General Radford	
2023	Deliver Us	Cardinal Russo	

=== Television ===
Year	Production	Role	Notes
1992	Big Battalions	Yousef	Miniseries, 4 episodes
1993–1999	Star Trek: Deep Space Nine	Dr. Julian Bashir	Credited as Siddig El Fadil (1993–1995)
1993	Star Trek: The Next Generation	Dr. Julian Bashir	Episode: "Birthright"
2003	Spooks	Ibhn Khaldun	Episode: "Nest of Angels"
2005	Agatha Christie's Poirot	Mr. Shaitana	Episode: "Cards on the Table"
2006	Family Guy	Silly Nannies Player (voice)	Episode: "Patriot Games"
2007	24	Hamri Al-Assad	7 episodes
2008	Merlin	Kanen	Episode: "The Moment of Truth"
2009	Waking the Dead	Dr Mohammed	2 episodes (Endgame)
2010	Strike Back	Zahir Sharq	2 episodes
2011	Primeval	Philip Burton	Episode 24–36 (series 4–5)
2012	True Love	Ismail	Episode: "Sandra"
2013–2014	Da Vinci's Demons	Al-Rahim	13 episodes
2013	Wild Arabia	Narrator	Documentary
2013	Atlantis	King Minos	8 episodes
2015–2016	Game of Thrones	Doran Martell	5 episodes (season 5–6)
2015	Tut	Amun	Miniseries
2015	Bar Rescue	Himself	Episode: "Brokedown Palace"
2016	Peaky Blinders	Ruben Oliver	6 episodes
2017	The Kennedys: After Camelot	Aristotle Onassis	
2017–2018	Gotham	Ra's al Ghul	12 episodes (season 3–4)
2019	The Spy	Ahmed Suidani	Miniseries
2019	Deep State	Issouf Al Moctar	Season 2
2021	Star Wars: The Bad Batch	Senator Avi Singh	Episode: "Common Ground"
2021	Foundation	Advocate Xylas	Episode: "The Emperor's Peace" (S01E01)
2022	Shantaram	Khader Khan	Lead role
2024	Star Trek: Lower Decks	Holographic Julian Bashir (voice)	Episode: "Fissure Quest"
2024–present	Fallen	Howson	Main cast
2025	Foundation	Dr. Ebling Mis	Main Cast (Season 3)
2026	The Terminal List	Maajid Kifayat	Episode: "Shooter Ready" (S02E03)
