= Thomas Birkett, 3rd Baron Birkett =

British photographer

Thomas Birkett, 3rd Baron Birkett (born 25 July 1982) is a British hereditary peer and photographer. He is the son of Michael Birkett and Gloria Taylor, and the half-brother of actor Alexander Siddig.

Tom Birkett married the ballerina Nathalie Harrison in 2014. Birkett succeeded his father in the family title in 2015, thus his wife is now formally styled The Lady Birkett. Also in 2015, he was admitted as a Freeman of the Curriers' Company.

Lord and Lady Birkett live in London WC1.

== See also ==
- The Royal Ballet

== Arms ==
Coat of arms of Baron Birkett
Notes Granted by Sir Algar Howard, Garter King of Arms (College of Arms, 1958) Crest Between two wings gules a Viking ship proper charged on the sail with a raven close sable. Escutcheon Gules three full bottomed wigs argent. Supporters Dexter, a lion or semee of roses gules; Sinister, a wolf sable semee of mullets gold. Motto Lex mea lux (The law is my light).

Peerage of the United Kingdom
Preceded by Michael Birkett	Baron Birkett; 2015–present	Incumbent
