= Norman Birkett, 1st Baron Birkett =

British barrister, judge, politician and preacher (1883–1962)

The Right Honourable The Lord Birkett PC

Lord Justice of Appeal
- In office 30 September 1950 – 5 January 1957
- Preceded by: Sir James Tucker
- Succeeded by: Sir Frederic Sellers

Justice of the High Court
- In office 11 November 1941 – 30 September 1950
- Preceded by: Sir Anthony Hawke
- Succeeded by: Sir William McNair

Member of Parliament for Nottingham East
- In office 30 May 1929 – 27 October 1931
- Preceded by: Edmund Brocklebank
- Succeeded by: Louis Gluckstein
- In office 6 December 1923 – 29 October 1924
- Preceded by: John Houfton
- Succeeded by: Edmund Brocklebank

Personal details
- Born: 6 September 1883 Ulverston, Lancashire, England
- Died: 10 February 1962 (aged 78) London, England
- Party: Liberal
- Spouse: Ruth Nilsson
- Children: 2, including Michael
- Education: Emmanuel College, Cambridge
- Profession: Barrister; judge

William Norman Birkett, 1st Baron Birkett, PC (6 September 1883 – 10 February 1962), was a British barrister, judge, politician and preacher who served as the deputy British judge during the Nuremberg Trials.

Birkett received his education at Barrow-in-Furness Higher Grade School. He was a Methodist preacher and a draper before attending Emmanuel College, Cambridge, in 1907, to study theology, history and law. Upon graduating in 1910 he worked as a secretary and was called to the Bar in 1913.

Declared medically unfit for military service during World War I, Birkett used the time to make up for his late entry into the legal profession and was appointed a King's Counsel in 1924. He became a criminal defence lawyer and acted as counsel in a number of famous cases including the second of the Brighton trunk murders. A member of the Liberal Party, he sat in Parliament for Nottingham East twice, first in 1923 and again in 1929.

Despite refusing appointment to the High Court of Justice in 1928, he was offered the position again in 1941 and accepted, joining the King's Bench Division. In 1945 he served as the alternate British judge at the Nuremberg trials, and he was made a privy counsellor in 1947. He joined the Court of Appeal in 1950 but retired in 1956 when he had served for long enough to draw a pension. From 1958 he served in the House of Lords, and his speech against a private bill in 1962 (the Bill sought to convert the Cumbrian lake Ullswater into a reservoir) saw it defeated by 70 votes to 36, two days before he died on 10 February 1962.

Described as "one of the most prominent Liberal barristers in the first half of the 20th century" and "the Lord Chancellor who never was", Birkett was noted for his skill as a speaker, which helped him defend clients with almost watertight cases against them. As an alternate judge, Birkett was not allowed a vote at the Nuremberg Trials, but his opinion helped shape the final judgment. During his tenure in the Court of Appeal he oversaw some of the most significant cases of the era, particularly in contract law, despite his avowed dislike of judicial work.

== Early life and education ==
Norman was born in Ulverston, Lancashire (now part of the administrative county of Cumbria), on 6 September 1883 to Thomas Birkett, a draper, and his wife Agnes, who died in 1884 of tuberculosis. He attended the Wesleyan primary school in Ulverston until 1894, when he moved to Barrow-in-Furness Higher Grade School. Although intelligent, Birkett was not noted as a particularly academic student and spent as much time on practical jokes as he did on his studies. He left school in 1898, starting work as an apprentice in one of the draper's shops owned by his father and beginning to preach. He was a popular local preacher on the local Methodist circuit, and, on deciding that he was unlikely to be a good draper, his father allowed him to leave the business in 1904 to become a minister under Charles Bedale. In 1905, Bedale suggested Birkett should go to Cambridge University to study history and theology. Birkett liked the idea, having previously conversed with A. C. Benson, the Master of Magdalene College, and applied to Emmanuel College, Cambridge. The college offered him a place, with the condition that he would have to pass an entrance examination and complete the responsions to be accepted into the university as a whole. He spent three months learning Latin and Greek and was accepted into the university in October 1907.

At Cambridge, Birkett preached on the local Methodist circuit and at The Leys School. He was also active in sport, playing rugby, football and golf. He first spoke at the Cambridge Union Society in his second term at Cambridge on the motion of "this House would welcome the Disestablishment of the Church of England", and the Cambridge Review reported that it was "a most interesting speech". In his second year, he was elected to the Emmanuel Debating Society Committee and spoke many times at the Union on subjects including Home Rule for Ireland, cruelty to animals and secular education. He befriended Arnold McNair, the Secretary of the Union, and McNair agreed to put Birkett's name on the electoral papers for election to the Union Committee. Birkett failed to get in, but on running again in 1910 was elected Secretary of the Union by a margin of only six votes. He became vice-president the following term, and President the term after that. While Birkett was president, the Cambridge Review reported that there was "no speaker more sure of pleasing the house", and the speech he gave when Theodore Roosevelt visited Cambridge was well received by both Roosevelt and the university as a whole.

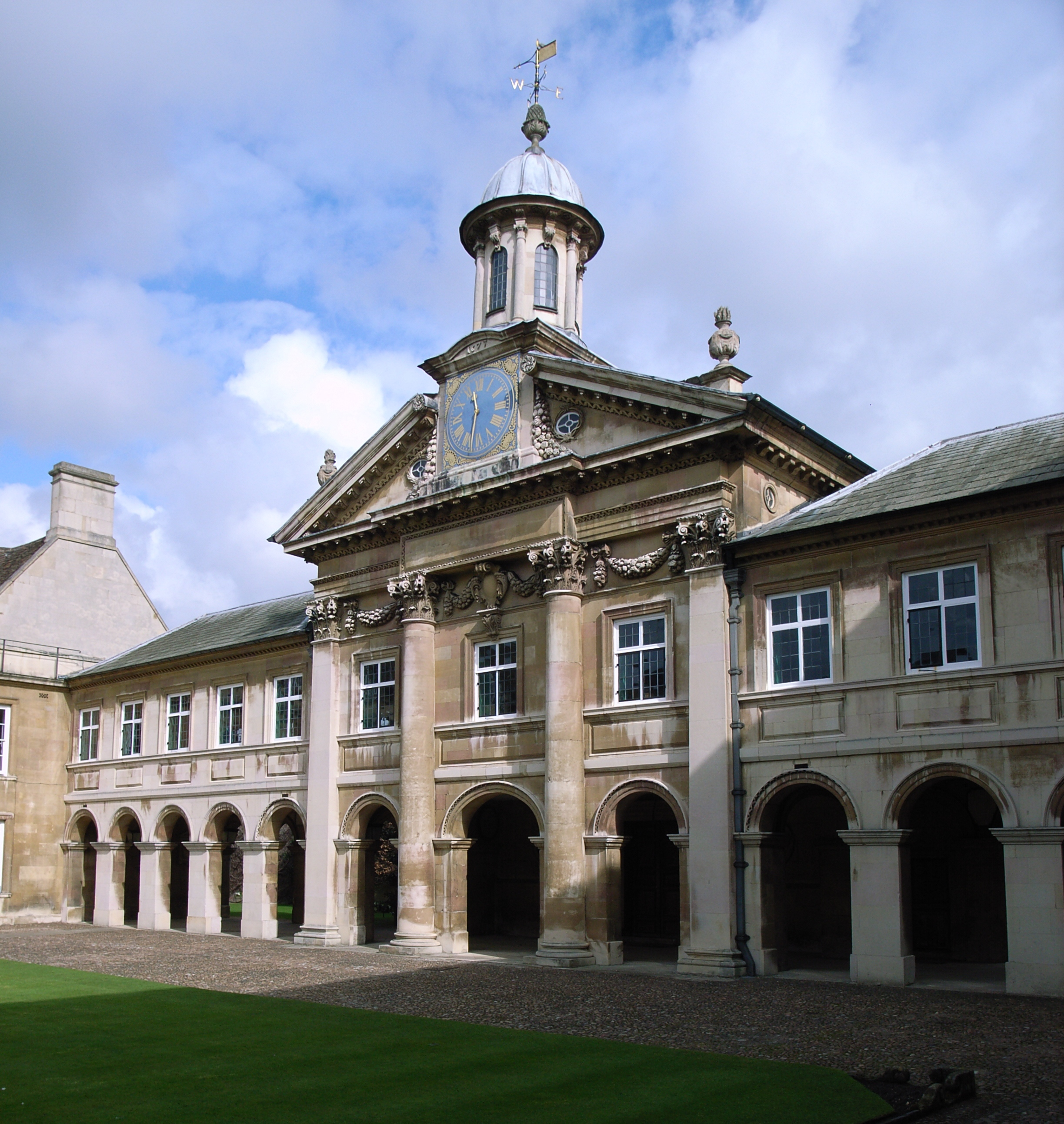
The chapel at Emmanuel College, Cambridge, where Birkett studied between 1907 and 1910.

He gained a second class in the Part I History Tripos in 1909, and won the English Essay Prize with an essay on political satire in English poetry. He won the same prize again in 1910, and that year gained first-class honours in his Theological Special Examination. By this point, he was having doubts about his future as a minister and consulted with the university Law Reader as to the possibility of a career as a barrister. On the Reader's advice, Birkett took the Part II Law Tripos in 1911, passing with second-class honours. Birkett interviewed with the editors of The Guardian and The Observer in his search for a job to sustain him while he took the bar exam. He took a job as personal secretary to George Cadbury Junior, with a wage of £200 a year, which he planned to hold until he qualified as a barrister. After only a month of working for Cadbury, his salary was raised to £500, and he was offered a permanent position. While there, he continued his political work and spoke on behalf of the Liberal Party, cementing his reputation as an effective speaker by, on one occasion, holding the attention of more than a thousand people for an hour. He took the first part of the Bar Examination in 1912, but failed the paper on real property; he passed it on his second attempt, and was called to the Bar at the Inner Temple on 4 June 1913.

While working for Cadbury, Birkett befriended Ruth "Billy" Nilsson, and after he had proposed to her several times, she agreed to marry him. Nilsson gave up her position at Bourneville to move to London and they were married on 25 August 1920. They had two children, a daughter Linnea Birkett on 27 June 1923, and a son Michael Birkett on 22 October 1929. A keen golfer, he was a member of the Harewood Downs Golf Club, near Amersham, Buckinghamshire.

== Practice at the Bar and time as a member of parliament ==
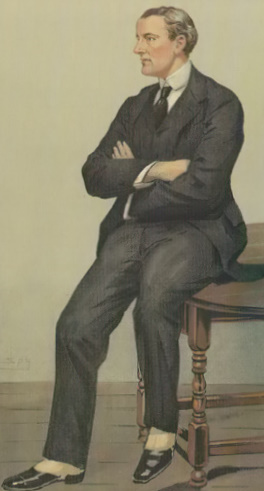
Edward Marshall Hall, who offered Birkett a place in his chambers based on his performance in the Green Bicycle Case.

After qualifying as a barrister, he moved to Birmingham in 1914, choosing the city because he had some connections there thanks to his association with Cadbury, and began work at the chambers of John Hurst. His career was aided by the outbreak of World War I; many of the younger and fitter barristers were called up for war service, whilst Birkett himself, who was thirty when he joined the bar, avoided conscription as he was declared medically unfit. He was suffering from tuberculosis, and he returned to Ulverston for six months to recover. During his time in Birmingham, he continued his work as a minister, regularly preaching at the Baptist People's Chapel.

Birkett became a popular defence counsel, something that on occasion caused him trouble; he was once forced to refuse a defendant's request to act as his representative because Birkett was expected in a different court. He impressed the Bench in Birmingham so much that, in 1919, he was advised by a local Circuit Judge to move to London to advance his career. Although he was initially hesitant, saying that "competition in London is on quite a different scale, and if I failed there, I would have lost everything I have built up here", a case he took in 1920 changed the situation. He acted as a junior for the prosecution in the so-called Green Bicycle Case against Edward Marshall Hall. Although he lost, he sufficiently impressed Marshall Hall for the latter to offer him a place in his chambers in London. He had no connections with the solicitors in London, and the clerk at his new chambers got around this lack of contacts by using him as counsel in cases involving Marshall Hall, who as a King's Counsel could appear in court only when accompanied by a junior barrister such as Birkett.

=== Member of Parliament ===
His father had been a supporter of the Liberal Party, and Birkett had helped campaign for them during the 1906 general election. He had been invited to become the Liberal candidate for Cambridge in 1911, but he refused because he had no income; he did, however, help his employer George Cadbury, Jr. get elected as a Liberal Councillor in Birmingham and helped start a branch of the National League of Young Liberals in the city. Birkett was the Liberal candidate for Birmingham King's Norton in the 1918 general election, but lost to Herbert Austin. Birkett's political career took off in 1923. He ran for Nottingham East in the 1923 general election, and was elected with a majority of 1,436 votes, a feat that was described as an "overwhelming victory" since the Conservative Party had held the seat since 1910 and had a majority of 4,000 at the previous election.

Birkett's maiden speech in Parliament responded to a proposal by Charles Dukes, a Labour Party Member of Parliament, in favour of state pensions for widows with children, and wives whose husbands were unable to work because of injury. Birkett went further than the proposed change and suggested that pensions should be provided to unmarried mothers, deserted wives and divorced wives. His speech was well-received; the Nottingham Journal described it as making "a most excellent impression" on the House of Commons, and Charles Masterman called him "a possible future Lord Chancellor". Because of his focus on his career as a barrister rather than as a politician, Birkett rarely appeared in the House of Commons, but he worked hard when he did attend. On one occasion, he spent all night in a Parliamentary session that ended at 6 a.m. and then attended a court session the next day.

He applied to become a King's Counsel in 1924, since barristers who were also parliamentarians stood a higher chance of getting accepted than others. He was accepted on 15 April 1924 and sworn in on the same day. His promotion was met with approval from several noted judges, including Arthur Greer, later a Lord Justice of Appeal, who wrote that "unless my judgement is very much astray, you will quickly acquire a leading place in the front row", a feeling which was echoed by other justices including William Finlay, who wrote that "I am confident that you will rise to the top of the profession, and I shall very greatly rejoice when my confidence is justified." In his first year as a King's Counsel Birkett earned £8,600, double what he had taken the previous year as a junior brief.

In 1924, the Campbell Case brought down the Labour minority government and forced a general election. Birkett returned to Nottingham East to campaign for his re-election, though he faced a much more difficult job than he had in 1923. The Conservative candidate, Edmund Brocklebank, was much stronger than in the previous election, and the left-wing vote was split because he was also campaigning against Tom Mann, a noted Communist. A few days before the election, the Zinoviev letter, allegedly addressed to the Communist Party, was published that mentioned organising uprisings in British colonies; fear of the "socialist menace" drove many voters to the right, and in the election on 29 October 1924, many Liberal members of parliament, including Birkett, lost their seats to Conservatives.

=== Practice at the Bar in London ===
While working with Marshall Hall, Birkett was involved in several notable criminal cases that helped cement his reputation as an outstanding speaker at the Bar.

In 1925, a case known as the "Bachelor's Case" came up at the High Court of Justice between Lieutenant-Colonel Ian Dennistoun and his ex-wife Dorothy Dennistoun. When the Dennistouns divorced, Mr. Dennistoun could not pay ancillary relief. He instead promised that he would provide for his ex-wife in the future when he had the money. Some time after the divorce, Mr. Dennistoun married Almina Herbert, Countess of Carnarvon, the widow of Lord Carnarvon, a rich woman thanks to the terms of her husband's will, who provided for her new husband. After hearing about this, Dorothy Dennistoun demanded the alimony money she had been promised. Lady Carnarvon saw this as blackmail and persuaded her new husband to take his wife to court for what Sir Henry McCardie, who tried the case, called "the most bitterly conducted litigation I have ever known". Marshall Hall and Birkett both worked on the case representing Lady Carnarvon and Mr. Dennistoun, while Ellis Hume-Williams, one of the most respected divorce barristers of the day, represented Mrs. Dennistoun.

The case initially appeared to be going badly for Marshall Hall. An inept cross-examination on his part weakened his argument, and an illness made him irritable and short-tempered. On the advice of his clerk, he asked Birkett to make the closing address before the court, which turned the mood of the courtroom completely and an initially hostile jury decided to disregard the agreement of Mr. Dennistoun to pay ancillary relief to his former wife. Birkett's performance made the front pages of many evening newspapers, including The Daily Mail which described Birkett as "the greatest legal discovery of the year" and called his speech "a brilliant piece of advocacy". His work for this case and the newspaper coverage of it brought him to the attention of many London solicitors, and led to him earning £8,000 in the first seven months of 1925. In that year he made £12,000 overall, an amount which rose to £16,500 in 1926 and peaked in 1929 when he earned £33,500. On meeting Miles Malleson, an old friend from his time at Cambridge, he said in surprise "did you know, Miles, that I am making more money than I thought existed in the world!"

Birkett represented publisher Jonathan Cape in the 1928 obscenity trial against Radclyffe Hall's novel The Well of Loneliness. Birkett arrived two hours late to court on the first day of the trial, and performed poorly. During a recess, Hall insisted that Birkett retract his early argument that the romantic relationships depicted between women in the trial were merely platonic.

=== Return to politics ===
Birkett was returned as MP for Nottingham East at the general election on 31 May 1929 in which he won 14,049 votes, taking the seat with a majority of 2,939.

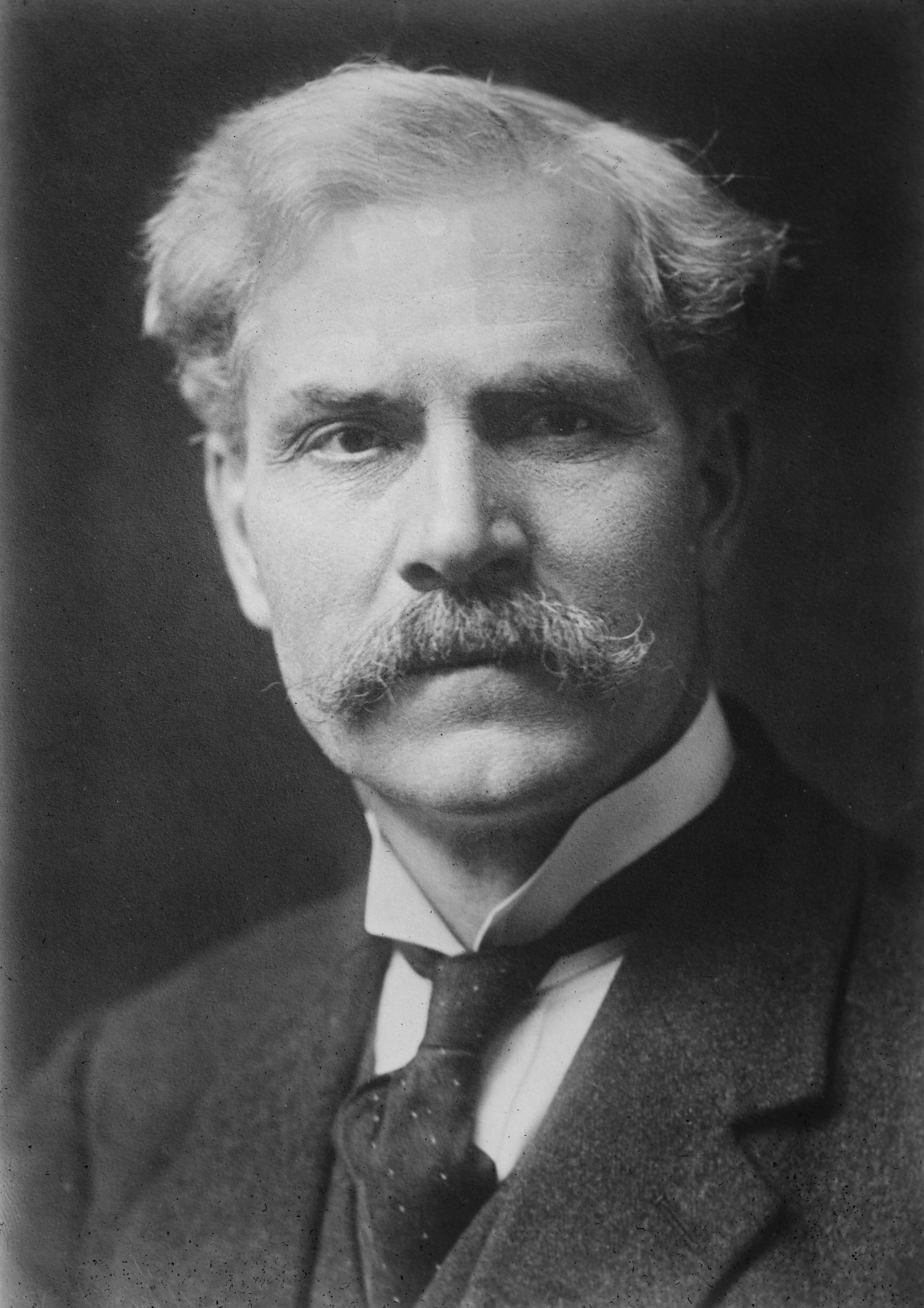
Ramsay MacDonald, who offered Birkett the position of Solicitor General if he would defect and join the Labour Party

As the largest single party, the Labour Party formed a minority government and set about filling the ministerial posts. The Labour Party had few experienced lawyers in the House of Commons, so Labour Prime Minister Ramsay MacDonald attempted to lure prominent Liberal lawyers to fill the positions of Attorney General and Solicitor General for England and Wales. William Jowitt defected to the Labour Party in exchange for the position of Attorney General, and the position of Solicitor General was offered to Birkett. Birkett replied that "he could not change his politics in twenty-five minutes, and even if the Liberal Party should disintegrate completely, he would not be seen taking refuge in the Labour ark".

Despite having to juggle his career at the Bar and as a member of parliament, Birkett kept up a good attendance in the House of Commons, and along with Sir John Simon he became the leading Liberal spokesperson on the legal side of legislation. His attack on a clause of the Finance Act 1930 drew much praise from both Liberal and Conservative politicians, including Winston Churchill, who said that "I have rarely heard a speech more precisely directed at the object under debate, more harmoniously attuned to the character of Committee discussion, than the excellent statement the Honourable and learned Gentleman has just made". Birkett led the Liberal response to the Labour proposal of the Trade Disputes Bill 1931 and "reduced it to tatters", although the Bill passed because of some Liberal abstentions. The speech was a particularly well-received one and led MacDonald to again offer the position of Solicitor General to Birkett, as the incumbent postholder James Melville was about to resign. Again Birkett refused, and Stafford Cripps was appointed. When the Liberal Party returned to power in 1931 in coalition with the Conservatives and National Labour as part of MacDonald's National Government, it was expected that Birkett would be offered the position being a Liberal Member of Parliament, but by the time they proposed candidates for Solicitor General, the Liberals had exceeded their ministerial quota agreed to in the coalition. Birkett was offered a non-legal office but said that he "could not contemplate a post that meant giving up my practice".

After an economic crisis in 1931, the King dissolved parliament and Birkett returned to Nottingham East to defend his seat; his main opponent was the Conservative, Louis Gluckstein, who had challenged him in the 1929 election. The Conservative Party's support of protectionism met with approval from the electorate, as most were employed in industries which had suffered after the institution of free trade. Gluckstein won the general election on 27 October 1931 with a majority of 5,583 votes.

On 3 November, Birkett was informed that if he had been returned, the Prime Minister intended to make him Solicitor-General. Disillusioned with the circumstances of the election, Birkett "[bade] farewell to East Nottingham" and retired from politics. He was invited to become a Liberal candidate two more times; once in 1931 for Torquay and once in 1932 for North Cornwall. The second was a tempting offer; the seat had become vacant on the death of its previous holder, a National Liberal with a comfortable majority, and it was felt that Birkett was almost certain to be returned to Parliament. Despite this, he refused, disliking the National Liberal policies and the extent to which they had aligned themselves with the Conservative Party.

=== Return to the Bar ===
In 1930, Birkett was involved in the so-called Blazing Car murder case. On 6 November 1930, two men returning home in Northampton noticed a bright light in the distance and saw a man come out of a ditch at the side of the road, glance back toward the light and say "looks like somebody has had a bonfire". The two young men ran toward the light, saw it was a burning car and fetched a policeman. When the fires died away, a body was found inside the boot of a car with a face so charred it was impossible to determine the identity of the man; the numberplate of the car was intact, however, and traced to an Alfred Arthur Rouse. Rouse was arrested and appeared at Northampton Crown Court on 26 January 1931, charged with the murder of an unknown man. He was defended by Donald Finnemore, and the Crown was represented by Birkett and Richard Elwes. Rouse was damned by a series of events. When arrested, he made statements such as "I'm very glad it's over" and "I'm responsible" and that the car engine had been off at the time of the fire, ruling out the possibility of accidental ignition. When he appeared as a witness, the defendant claimed that after giving an unknown man a lift, he had found that he was running out of petrol and had asked the passenger to take the spare can in the car and fill up the fuel tank. While he was doing this, Rouse testified that he went to the side of the road to urinate, and while there heard a large explosion. He said he saw a large flame and became convinced the petrol tank would explode. As such he ran away as fast as possible, at which point he ran into the two young men on the road.

The cross-examination of him and other witnesses by Birkett swayed the jury, and they took only fifteen minutes to find Rouse guilty of murder. After his appeal had been rejected by both the Court of Appeal and the Home Secretary, Rouse admitted that he had in fact committed the murder – although he never gave a reason – it was theorised that he had done so in an attempt to fake his own death. Despite his admission of guilt the identity of the victim has never been discovered.

In 1934, Birkett acted as counsel for the second of the two Brighton trunk murders, a case which was described as "his greatest triumph in a capital case". In June 1934, a woman's torso was found in a suitcase in Brighton railway station. The legs were discovered at King's Cross station the next day, but her head and arms were never found, and the case is still unsolved. A woman by the name of Violette Kaye had disappeared, and the appearance of the first woman's body prompted greater scrutiny on Kaye's case. On 14 July, they interviewed Toni Mancini, Kaye's boyfriend, who convinced them that the dead woman could not possibly be Kaye; the dead woman had been identified as around thirty five years old and five months pregnant, while Kaye was ten years older. Kaye was last seen alive on 10 May looking distressed in the doorway to her house and had been scheduled to visit her sister in London who received a telegram on 11 May reading "Going abroad. Good job. Sail Sunday. Will write. Vi." in block capitals. The post office clerks could not remember who sent it, but experts testified that the handwriting on the telegram had similarities to that on a menu written by Mancini. On 14 May, with the help of another man, Mancini moved his belongings from the house he shared with Kaye, which included a large trunk which was too heavy to move by hand. Mancini had told people that he had broken up with Kaye and she had moved to Paris, and that before she left he had beaten her. He later said to a friend, "What is the good of knocking a woman about with your fists? You only hurt yourself. You should hit her with a hammer same as I did and [chop] her up." A hammerhead was later found in the rubbish at his old house.

After the police had left on 14 July, Mancini got on a train to London. When the police arrived the next morning, they were unable to find Mancini but found Kaye's body decomposing in the trunk in his new home. They immediately sent out a country-wide call for Mancini to be arrested, and he was picked up near London. He claimed he was not guilty, and stated during interviews with police that he had returned home to find Kaye dead. Fearing that with his criminal record, the police would not believe him, he had hidden the body in a trunk. While Mancini was in prison, his solicitor phoned Birkett and asked him to work as counsel for the defence, which Birkett agreed to do. In his defence, Birkett highlighted flaws in the prosecution's case to introduce an element of doubt in the minds of the jury. His cross-examination of Sir Bernard Spilsbury, famous Home Office pathologist and potentially the most dangerous witness for the Crown, was seen as "masterly". Birkett also emphasised the affectionate nature of the relationship between Kaye and Mancini before Kaye's death. Despite strong evidence that he had committed the crime, including marks on the victim's skull believed to be from a hammer and marks of blood on Mancini's clothing, the jury found Mancini not guilty after two and a half hours of deliberations. Mancini confessed to the murder before dying.

In March 1936, Birkett defended Dr Buck Ruxton over the infamous Jigsaw Murders. Ruxton was found guilty of murdering his wife, Isabella, and their children's nanny, Mary Rogerson, before dismembering their bodies and disposing of the parts in a ravine at Moffat, in the Scottish Borders. Ruxton was hanged at Strangeways Prison in May 1936.

In May 1937 Birkett was appointed Chairman of the Inter-Departmental Committee for Abortion set up by the Minister of Health and Home Secretary, preparing a report "to inquire into the prevalence of abortion, and the law relating thereto, and to consider what steps can be taken by more effective enforcement of the law", something which occupied him for two years. During the summer of 1937, Birkett was asked to represent the English Bar at the annual meeting of the Canadian Bar Association in Toronto, where he was a popular speaker. In January 1938, he was asked to act as a Commissioner of Assize to open the Assize Court in Aylesbury, dealing with an average of 10 cases a day. After the outbreak of World War II in 1939, he became a member of a committee advising the Home Secretary on the detention of suspected enemy agents. The committee dealt with more than 1,500 cases in two years. Although the work was unpaid, he was knighted (as a Knight Bachelor) on 6 June 1941 as a reward for his work. He also delivered weekly radio broadcasts after the Friday night news to counter the broadcasts of William Joyce, known as Lord Haw Haw. The first broadcast took place on 9 February 1940, and they were considered to be a morale boost during the so-called Phoney War.

== Judicial work ==
Birkett had been offered appointment to the High Court as early as 1928, but turned it down, saying that "I wasn't really drawn to the judicial office... I loved the Bar too much". After the death of the High Court judge Sir Anthony Hawke in October 1941, the Lord Chancellor Lord Simon offered Birkett the seat. Birkett considered it his "public duty" to join the bench and wrote back on 4 November accepting the offer. He was sworn in on 11 November 1941 and first sat on 24 November. He did not enjoy his time in the high courts, admitting that he "missed the limelight" of being an advocate, and, combined with ill-health, he suffered from depression in 1942. He was, however, a popular judge, although he felt he was too weak in his judgments because he "did not desire to hurt people's feelings". At one point, the Daily Herald reported he was to be made Viceroy of India. For several weeks in 1943, he sat in the Court of Appeal before departing on an Assize visit. He fell ill after a few weeks with a combination of heart disease and pneumonia, and he returned home to recover. He suffered from more illness over the next year and considered resigning as a judge, as he felt that he could no longer trust his abilities as one. During his time in the High Court, he dealt with several notable cases including Constantine v Imperial Hotels Ltd, which reaffirmed the common law principle that innkeepers must not refuse accommodation to guests without just cause.

=== Nuremberg trials ===
On 30 August 1945, Birkett received a letter from the Lord Chancellor asking him to serve as the British judge at the Nuremberg Trials of German War Criminals. He accepted, saying that it was "a great honour to be selected". However, when he went to London to discuss it, he was informed that the Foreign Office wanted a more senior judge to be in attendance, ideally a Law Lord, but since no Law Lord was available, they had requested that a judge from the Court of Appeal should be appointed. Geoffrey Lawrence was made the main British judge, and Birkett was offered the position of alternate judge for the trials, which he accepted, although with less enthusiasm than he had shown when accepting the original offer. He became friends with the American judge Francis Biddle, although when they first met he accidentally confused him with Anthony Drexel Biddle and remarked how useful his diplomatic training would be in the trials.

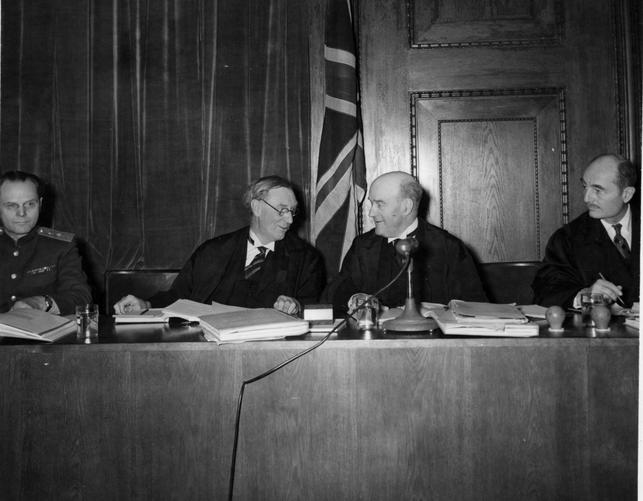
The British Nuremberg judges; Birkett is second from the left

The trial lasted from 18 October 1945 to 30 September 1946, and although Birkett did not have a vote in the proceedings as an alternate judge, his opinion was given weight, and it helped sway the decisions made by the main judges. After returning home from the trials, he received praise from both the Lord Chancellor, who said that "The country owes much to him for vindicating our conceptions of an impartial trial under the rule of law", and from John Parker, the American alternate judge, who wrote that:

Although only an alternate member of the tribunal without a vote, his voice was heard in all of its deliberations, his hand drafted a large and most important part of its judgment, and no one connected with the tribunal, member or otherwise, had a greater part than he in shaping the final result. If, as I confidently believe, the work of the tribunal will constitute a landmark in the development of world order based on law, to Norman Birkett must go a large share of the credit for the success of the undertaking. To few men does the opportunity come to labour so mightily for the welfare of their kind.

After the judges returned home, Lawrence was made a Baron for his work at Nuremberg, but Birkett received nothing. The lack of reward for his work pushed him into depression, which he took many months to recover from. He was eventually made a Privy Counsellor in the 1947 Birthday Honours, but he saw this as poor reward for the work he had put in at Nuremberg.

=== Further judicial work ===
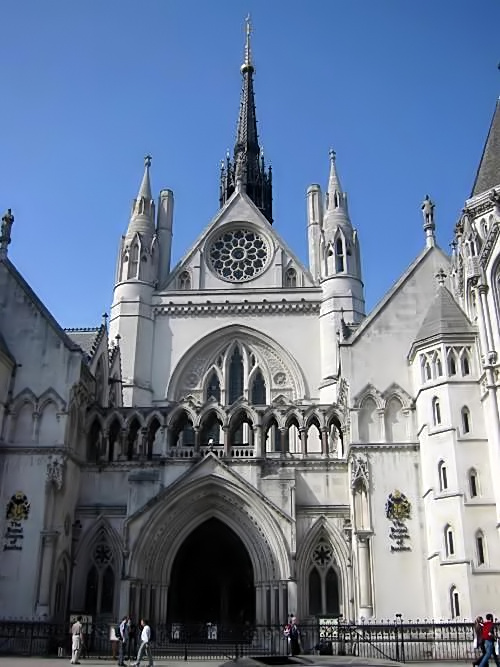
The Royal Courts of Justice, where Birkett sat between 1941 and 1956.

The rest of his time in the High Court passed uneventfully, but he continued to be unhappy with his work as a judge, noting that "I am nervous of myself, without much confidence in my judgment and hesitant about my sentences and damages and things of that kind. I have felt no glow of achievement in any summing up, though none of them have been bad."

He was again struck by depression in 1948 when Sir Alfred Thompson Denning and Sir John Singleton were both appointed to the Court of Appeal ahead of him, despite having been appointed to the High Court after him. On 30 July 1949, Birkett went to the Lord Chancellor and discussed the possibility of his appointment to the Court of Appeal, but left dissatisfied. On 14 November, a duodenal ulcer perforated, from which he spent six months recovering. In an attempt to appease him, the Lord Chancellor offered Birkett a peerage without salary on 8 May 1950, but he refused as he lacked the means to survive without paid employment. While speaking at a conference in Washington, D.C., on 31 August 1950, he received a telegram from the Lord Chancellor offering him appointment to the Court of Appeal; he immediately wired back his acceptance. He was sworn in on 2 October, and heard his first case the following day.

He found the work in the Court of Appeal dull, and his disappointment increased the longer he worked. As in the High Court, he felt uncertain about his judgements and unsure as to whether he was affecting the law. Despite his personal opinion of himself, the judiciary as a whole felt that his mix of humanity and common sense was beneficial to the court. During the 1951 Long Vacation he broadcast three talks for the BBC on the subject of international law and its growth and gave a speech for the Law Society titled "The Lawyer's Contribution to Society". Despite his unhappiness with his work in the Court of Appeal, he worked until 1956, when his long service as a judge allowed him to draw a pension. In his remaining time in the Court of Appeal, Birkett judged several notable cases, in particular Pharmaceutical Society of Great Britain v Boots Cash Chemists (Southern) Ltd [1953] 1 QB 401, and Entores Ltd v Miles Far East Corporation [1955] 2 QB 327, where the court made a landmark decision on acceptance of a contract in relation to Telex.

== Retirement ==
On 13 June 1957 he became chairman of a committee of Privy Counsellors holding an inquiry into the Home Secretary's use of telephone tapping. After twenty-nine meetings, Birkett drafted a report which he passed on to Parliament supporting the use of telephone taps and noting their effectiveness. On 9 December, a letter arrived from the Prime Minister offering him a peerage. He accepted, and his name appeared in the 1958 New Years Honours list; created Baron Birkett, of Ulverston in the County of Lancaster, and took his seat in the House of Lords on 20 February 1958. In the same year, he was awarded a LLD by the University of Cambridge, where the speaker said that Birkett was "endowed with such a voice as Cicero declared to be first requisite of an orator" and that "in our own time there had been no one more skilled in swaying the mind of a jury." In February 1959, he appeared on the first episode of the BBC television program Face to Face, where he was described as "one of the three or four greatest criminal lawyers of this century, and perhaps one of the three or four greatest criminal lawyers of all time". Outside politics and the law, he also served as Master of the Worshipful Company of Curriers four times.

Birkett tried to sit as regularly in the House of Lords as possible, and made his maiden speech on 8 April 1959 on the subject of crime in the United Kingdom. In May, he moved the first reading of the Obscene Publications Bill, which passed with support from both sides of the house. Privately, Birkett believed that "there will never be a satisfactory law in England about obscenity. Our 1959 Act is the best we have yet done." In 1961, he was again invited by the BBC to give a series of talks on the BBC Home Service, this time titled "Six Great Advocates". He picked Edward Marshall Hall, Patrick Hastings, Edward Clarke, Rufus Isaacs, Charles Russell and Thomas Erskine. He sat for the last time in the House of Lords on 8 February 1962, where he made a speech criticising an element of the Manchester Corporation Bill which would have water drained from Ullswater to meet the needs of the growing population in Manchester. His speech was "deeply felt and eloquent", and when the votes were announced, Birkett and his supporters had won by 70 votes to 36. The Ullswater Yacht Club now holds an annual Lord Birkett Memorial Trophy Race on the lake.

The next morning he complained of heart trouble, collapsed shortly after lunch and was taken to the hospital. The doctors discovered that he had ruptured an important blood vessel and immediate surgery was needed to fix it. The operation failed to fix the problem, and he died early in the morning on 10 February 1962. His son, Michael, succeeded him as Baron Birkett.

=== Arms ===
Coat of arms of Norman Birkett, 1st Baron Birkett
| Notes Granted by Sir Algar Howard, Garter King of Arms (College of Arms, 1958) Crest Between two wings gules a Viking ship proper charged on the sail with a raven close sable. Escutcheon Gules three full bottomed wigs argent. Supporters Dexter, a lion or semee of roses gules; Sinister, a wolf sable semee of mullets gold. Motto Lex mea lux (The law is my light). |

== Notes ==
Parliament of the United Kingdom
| Preceded by John Houfton | Member of Parliament for Nottingham East; 1923–1924 | Succeeded by Edmund Brocklebank |
| Preceded by Edmund Brocklebank | Member of Parliament for Nottingham East; 1929–1931 | Succeeded by Louis Gluckstein |
Peerage of the United Kingdom
| New creation | Baron Birkett; 1958–1962 | Succeeded by Michael Birkett |
