= A Lost Man =

Un homme perdu - رجل ضائع
- Poster used in Cannes 2007
- Directed by: Danielle Arbid
- Written by: Danielle Arbid
- Produced by: Charles Gillibert; Nathanaël Karmitz
- Starring: Melvil Poupaud; Yasmine Lafitte; Carol Abboud; Alexander Siddig; Sarah Warde
- Cinematography: Céline Bozon
- Release date: 19 September 2007
- Running time: 97 minutes
- Country: Lebanon
- Languages: Arabic, French

A Lost Man (French: Un homme perdu, Arabic: رجل ضائع rajulun ḍāˀyiˁ, Levantine Arabic rajolon ḍāˀyeˁ) is a 2007 Lebanese film by the Lebanese director Danielle Arbid.

The film premiered on 18 March during the 2007 Cannes Film Festival, in the Directors' Fortnight section. It is possibly the most sexually graphic film ever made by an Arab director. The film was inspired by the life of the French photographer Antoine D'Agata.

== Synopsis ==
The story is about a French photographer Thomas Koré (Melvil Poupaud), who is searching for extraordinary experiences. Koré has become so detached from humanity that the only way he can connect with other people is to have—and photograph—bizarre and demeaning sexual encounters with prostitutes. When he meets Fouad Saleh (Alexander Siddig), a man with memory problems, he realized that Fouad is even more lost than he, and befriends him. Koré then tries to uncover Fouad's history.
