= Shadows in the Sun (2005 film) =

- Written by: Brad Mirman
- Directed by: Brad Mirman
- Starring: Harvey Keitel; Joshua Jackson; Claire Forlani; Giancarlo Giannini
- Theme music composer: Mark Thomas
- Country of origin: Italy; United Kingdom; France
- Original language: English

Production
- Cinematography: Maurizio Calvesi
- Editor: Eddie Hamilton
- Running time: 100 minutes

Original release
- Network: ABC Family
- Release: November 13, 2005

Shadows in the Sun is a television movie starring Harvey Keitel and Joshua Jackson. It premiered on ABC Family on November 13, 2005. It was written and directed by Brad Mirman, and was filmed under the title The Shadow Dancer.

== Background ==
The film, set in Tuscany, has been compared to Under the Tuscan Sun. It was largely shot in the Val d'Orcia.

== Synopsis ==
Jeremy (Joshua Jackson), an American-British book editor living in London, is an aspiring writer seeking a new lease on life. He is sent by his employer to Tuscany, Italy to elicit a new book from American-Italian author Weldon Parish (Harvey Keitel). Parish, whose wife died 20 years ago, has been stricken with writer's block ever since, and for years he resisted the prospect of writers or editors soliciting more work from him.

Despite some initial hostility between Jeremy and Weldon, the two gradually become closer. Weldon is impressed by Jeremy's sharp dismissal of an arrogant author named Ian, and soon he becomes Jeremy's mentor. The two men spend time walking around the countryside while exchanging life experiences and thoughts. Together they socialize with local residents, and Jeremy befriends a few of them. Jeremy is totally captivated by Weldon's daughter Isabella (Claire Forlani), and one festive night, he shares an intimate moment with Isabella.

At the end, Weldon finds an inspiration and once again is able to write. Jeremy decides not to return home, but to choose Isabella instead, and resolves to finish his long-dormant novel.

== Cast ==
- Harvey Keitel as Weldon Parish
- Joshua Jackson as Jeremy Taylor
- Claire Forlani as Isabella Parish
- Giancarlo Giannini as Father Moretti
- Armando Pucci as Gustavo
- Valeria Cavalli as Amalia
- Bianca Guaccero as Maura Parish
- Silvia De Santis as Dinnie Parish
- John Rhys-Davies as Mr. Benton

== Critical reception ==
Variety wrote that the film was predictable with a "hackneyed script," though praising Keitel and Giannini's performances: "It's as if these two pros know they're gliding through mediocrity and have decided to just enjoy each other's company." PopMatters also panned the film as "generating cringing laughter."
