= Joshua Jackson =

Canadian and American actor (born 1978)

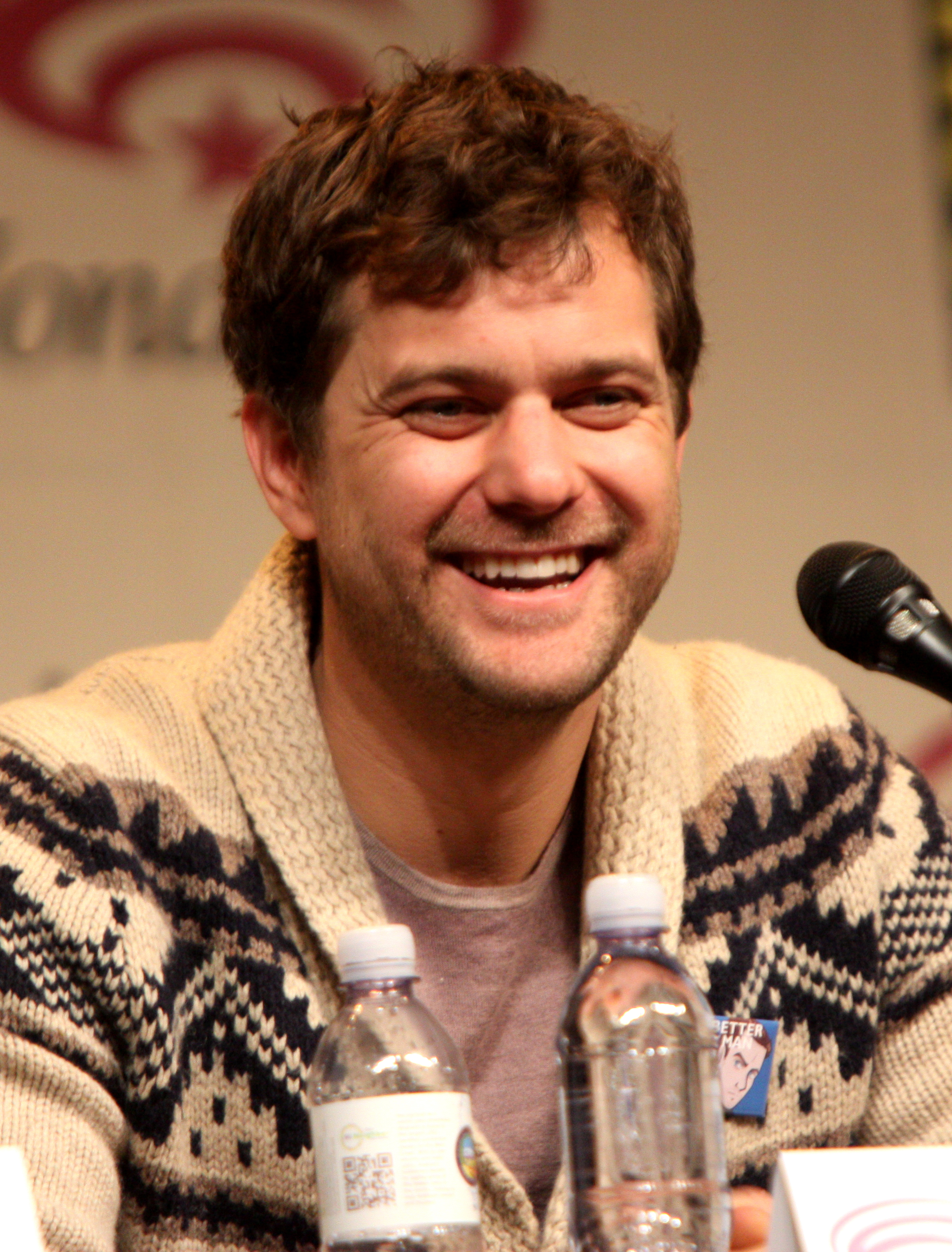
- Jackson at the 2010 San Diego Comic-Con
- Born: Joshua Carter Jackson; June 11, 1978 (age 48); Vancouver, British Columbia, Canada
- Occupation: Actor
- Years active: 1991–present
- Spouse: Jodie Turner-Smith (m. 2019; div. 2025)
- Partner: Diane Kruger (2006–2016)
- Children: 1

Joshua Carter Jackson (born June 11, 1978) is a Canadian and American actor. He is known for his portrayals of Pacey Witter on The WB's teen drama Dawson's Creek (1998–2003), Peter Bishop in the Fox science fiction series Fringe (2008–2013), a troubled married man on Showtime's The Affair (2014–2018), and Christopher Duntsch in the Peacock crime drama series Dr. Death (2021–2023). For the last of these, he was nominated for a Critics' Choice Television Award for Best Actor. His other credits include When They See Us (2019), Little Fires Everywhere (2020), and Doctor Odyssey (2024–2025).

Outside of television, he came to prominence with his role in the Mighty Ducks film series (1992–1996). His other film appearances include Apt Pupil (1998), Urban Legend (1998), Cruel Intentions (1999), The Skulls (2000), Gossip (2000), The Safety of Objects (2001), The Laramie Project (2002), Cursed (2005), Bobby (2006), and Shutter (2008). For his performance in the Canadian independent drama One Week (2008), Jackson won the Genie Award for Best Actor.

== Early life ==
Jackson was born on June 11, 1978, in Vancouver, British Columbia to parents John and Fiona. His mother is a casting director. Jackson's father is from Texas, and his mother is a native of Ballyfermot, a surburb of Dublin, Ireland. She immigrated to North America in the late 1960s. He has a younger sister, Aisleagh, and two older half brothers, Jonathan and Lyman. He was raised Roman Catholic.

Jackson lived in California until the age of 8 when he moved to Vancouver with his mother and younger sister; he has said that his father was a bad parent and husband and abandoned the family when they were in the U.S. He attended Ideal Mini School and later switched to Kitsilano Secondary School. He attended high school with actor Ryan Reynolds.

== Career ==
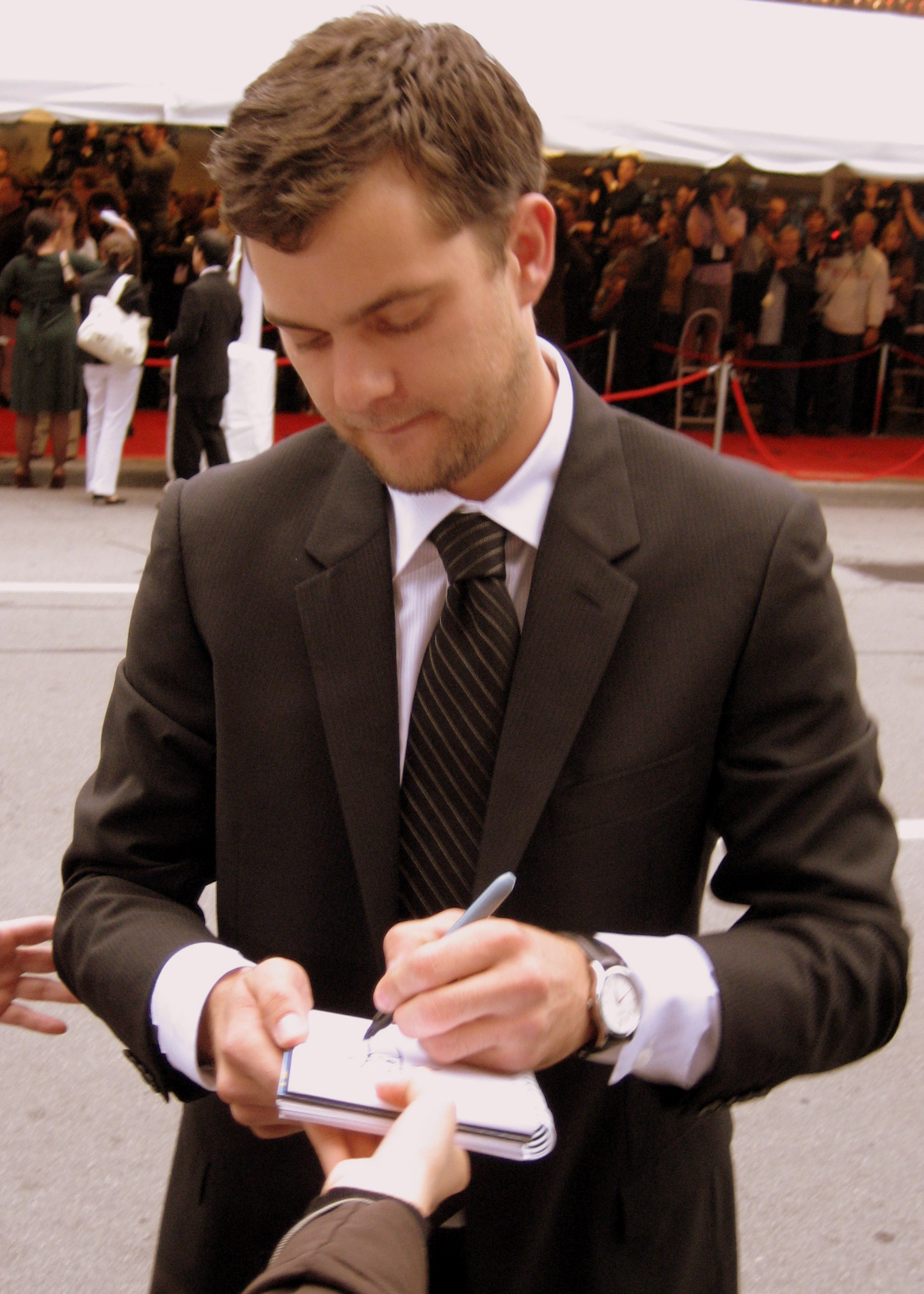
Jackson at the premiere of Bobby, Toronto International Film Festival in 2006

Jackson started acting in a small role in the film Crooked Hearts in 1991. The next year, he played the role of Charlie in a musical version of Willy Wonka and the Chocolate Factory. At this point, with the help of the play's casting director Laura Kennedy, he joined the William Morris Agency. Soon after, he landed the role of Charlie (#96) in The Mighty Ducks series, playing a young and aspiring hockey player.

Jackson went on to appear as Pacey Witter on Dawson's Creek, which was created by Kevin Williamson and ran on the WB network from 1998 to 2003, and also starred James Van Der Beek, Michelle Williams, and Katie Holmes. While the show was on hiatus, he appeared in several movies including Cruel Intentions (an adaptation of Les Liaisons dangereuses that also starred Sarah Michelle Gellar and Ryan Phillippe), The Skulls, The Safety of Objects, The Laramie Project and a short cameo in the remake of Ocean's Eleven in which he appears as himself in a poker scene with Brad Pitt, George Clooney and Holly Marie Combs. In 2000, he also guest-starred in Season 12 of The Simpsons, voicing the character of Jesse Grass, a "hunky environmentalist" and love interest for Lisa Simpson in the episode "Lisa the Tree Hugger". He also was cast as "Beau" in the movie Gossip in 2000 with actors James Marsden, Kate Hudson and Norman Reedus.

Shortly after Dawson's Creek ended in 2003, Jackson played the lead role in films alongside Dennis Hopper (Americano), Harvey Keitel (Shadows in the Sun), and Donald Sutherland (Aurora Borealis). In 2005, Jackson moved to the UK and made his stage debut on the London West End with Patrick Stewart in David Mamet's two-man play, A Life in the Theatre. The play was a critical and popular success, and ran from February to April of that year. Jackson said that he would consider returning to the stage, to try his hand on Broadway. His next film role was in Bobby, directed by Emilio Estevez, Jackson's co-star from The Mighty Ducks. He played a lead role in Shutter, a U.S. remake of film of the same name. He starred and acted as executive producer in the Canadian independent film One Week, which opened on March 6, 2009.

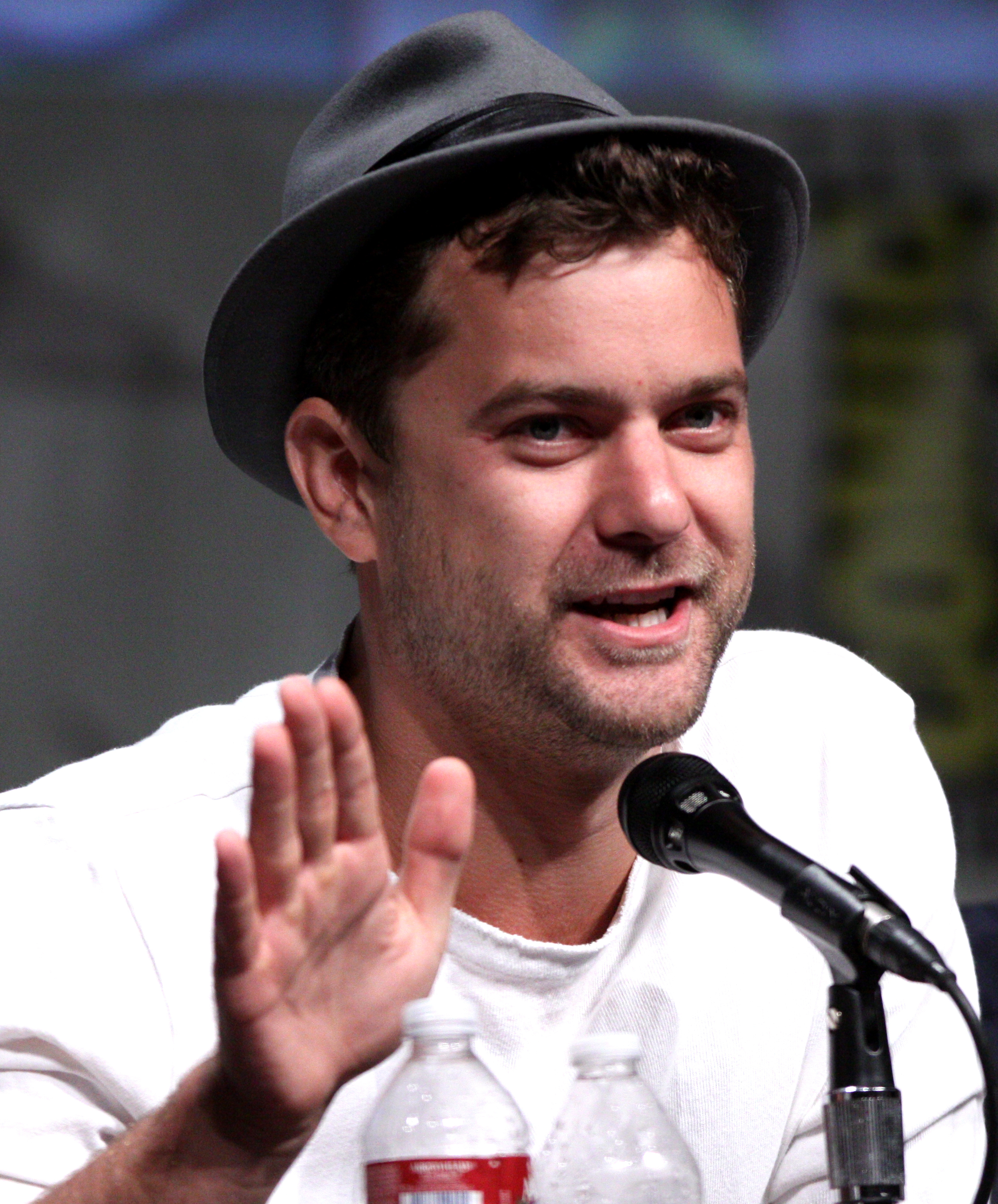
Jackson at the 2012 San Diego Comic-Con

From 2008 to 2013, Jackson played the lead role of Peter Bishop in the science-fiction series Fringe, created by J. J. Abrams, Roberto Orci and Alex Kurtzman. The series was the second-highest rated new show of the 2008–2009 season after The Mentalist. BuddyTV ranked him #9 on its "TV's 100 Sexiest Men of 2010" list, #19 in 2011 and #14 in 2012.

Jackson was nominated for a Genie Award for Best Performance by an Actor in a Leading Role for the film One Week. He won the award on April 12, 2010. He held and hosted the satirical Pacey-Con in 2010, directly across the street from the Comic-Con, sporting a bowling shirt and giving out fan fiction, written by Dawson's Creek fans, to those waiting in the Comic-Con entrance line. Footage of the event was recorded for a video, entitled "Pacey-Con", which he was filming for Will Ferrell's Funny or Die celebrity humor website. In 2013, Jackson appeared in the IFC film Inescapable with Marisa Tomei and Alexander Siddig. Jackson wrote the first story from the comic book trilogy Beyond the Fringe, titled "Peter and the Machine". Jackson starred in the successful television show The Affair, where he played Cole Lockhart, the protagonist husband of the unfaithful Alison Lockhart.

In March 2018, Jackson made his theatrical debut on Broadway in Children of a Lesser God, where he played James Leeds, an unconventional teacher at a school for the deaf who gets in a conflicted professional and romantic relationship with a deaf former student, Sarah Norman (Lauren Ridloff). The play ran through May 2018.

In 2019, Jackson starred as defense attorney Mickey Joseph in the miniseries When They See Us.

In 2020, Jackson co-starred with Reese Witherspoon and Kerry Washington in the miniseries Little Fires Everywhere based on the novel by Celeste Ng.

Jackson was cast as Dr. Christopher Duntsch, a neurosurgeon who was convicted of intentionally maiming his patient, in Dr. Death which was based on the podcast of the same name, replacing Jamie Dornan.

In 2023, Jackson played the lead in the series Fatal Attraction with Lizzy Caplan, inspired by the 1980s thriller film of the same name.

== Personal life ==
Jackson was in a relationship with Dawson's Creek co-star Katie Holmes during the first two seasons of the show's run. Holmes said that Jackson was her first love.

From 2006 to 2016, he was in a relationship with German actress Diane Kruger.

Jackson began a relationship with actress Jodie Turner-Smith in 2018. They married on August 18, 2019. On April 13, 2020, the couple welcomed their daughter. In October 2023, it was revealed that Turner-Smith had filed for divorce from Jackson. In May 2025, it was reported that the couple had reached a divorce settlement.

In December 2023, Jackson and fellow actor Lupita Nyong'o confirmed they were dating. In October 2024, Nyong'o announced they were no longer together.

Jackson owned his childhood home in Topanga, California. In 2025, the house burned down during the Palisades Fire. He previously lived in Wilmington, North Carolina, where Dawson's Creek was filmed, and in New York City, where Fringe filmed its first season. In 2009, he moved back to Vancouver to shoot four seasons of the show before the last episode was aired on January 18, 2013.

Jackson is a fan of the Vancouver Canucks and Anaheim Ducks ice hockey teams, and the San Francisco 49ers American football team.

== Filmography ==
=== Film ===
Year	Title	Role	Notes
1991	Crooked Hearts	Tom (11 years)	
1992	The Mighty Ducks	Charlie Conway	
1993	Digger	Billy	
1994	D2: The Mighty Ducks	Charlie Conway	
1994	Andre	Mark Baker	
1995	Magic in the Water	Joshua Black	
1996	D3: The Mighty Ducks	Charlie Conway	
1997	Ronnie and Julie	Ronnie	
1997	Scream 2	Film Class Guy #1	
1998	The Battery	Michael Papperman	Short film
1998	Apt Pupil	Joey	
1998	Urban Legend	Damon Brooks	
1999	Cruel Intentions	Blaine Tuttle	
1999	Muppets from Space	Pacey Witter	Uncredited cameo
2000	The Skulls	Lucas 'Luke' McNamara	
2000	Gossip	Beau Edson	
2001	The Safety of Objects	Paul Gold	
2001	Ocean's Eleven	Himself	Cameo
2002	The Laramie Project	Matt Galloway	
2002	Lone Star State of Mind	Earl Crest	Alternative title: Cowboys and Idiots
2003	I Love Your Work	John Everhart	
2005	Cursed	Jake Taylor	
2005	Racing Stripes	Trenton's Pride	Voice
2005	Americano	Chris McKinley	
2005	Aurora Borealis	Duncan Shorter	
2005	The Shadow Dancer	Jeremy Taylor	Alternative title: Shadows in the Sun
2006	Bobby	Wade Buckley	
2007	Battle in Seattle	Randall	
2008	Shutter	Benjamin Shaw	
2008	Gashole	Himself	Documentary
2008	One Week	Ben Tyler	
2012	Lay the Favorite	Jeremy	
2012	Inescapable	Paul	
2015	Sky	Detective Ruther	
2025	Karate Kid: Legends	Victor Lipani	
2026	Happy Hours	TBA	

=== Television ===
Year	Title	Role	Notes
1991	Payoff	Young Mac	Television film
1996	Champs	Matt Mazzilli	2 episodes
1996	Robin of Locksley	John Prince, Jr.	Television film
1997	Ronnie & Julie	Ronnie Monroe	Television film
1997	On the Edge of Innocence	Sammy	Television film
1997	The Outer Limits	Devon Taylor	Episode: "Music of the Spheres"
1998–2003	Dawson's Creek	Pacey Witter	Main role: 124 episodes
2000	Saturday Night Live	Himself/host	Episode: "Joshua Jackson/NSYNC"
2000	The Simpsons	Jesse Grass	Voice, episode: "Lisa the Tree Hugger"
2006	Capitol Law	Mark Clayton	Unsold TV pilot
2008–2013	Fringe	Peter Bishop	Main role: 96 episodes
2014–2018	The Affair	Cole Lockhart	Main role: 29 episodes
2016	Unbreakable Kimmy Schmidt	Purvis	Episode: "Kimmy Goes to a Hotel!"
2016	Years of Living Dangerously	Himself	Episode: "Collapse of the Oceans"
2019	When They See Us	Mickey Joseph	Episode: "Part Two"
2020	Little Fires Everywhere	Bill Richardson	Miniseries; 7 episodes
2021	Dr. Death	Dr. Christopher Duntsch	Main role (season 1): 8 episodes
2023	Fatal Attraction	Dan Gallagher	Lead role; Miniseries
2024–2025	Doctor Odyssey	Dr. Max Bankman	Main role, also executive producer

=== Stage ===
Year	Title	Role	Notes
2005	A Life in the Theatre	John	David Mamet play with Patrick Stewart
2016	Smart People	Brian	play by Lydia R. Diamond at Second Stage Theater
2017, 2018	Children of a Lesser God	James Leeds	Berkshire Theatre Festival with Kenny Leon; Studio 54

== Awards and nominations ==
Year	Association	Category	Nominated work	Result
1993	Young Artist Award	Outstanding Young Ensemble Cast in a Motion Picture	The Mighty Ducks	Nominated
1999	Teen Choice Awards	Choice TV Actor	Dawson's Creek	Won
2000	Teen Choice Awards	Choice TV Actor	Dawson's Creek	Won
2000	Teen Choice Awards	Choice Liar in a Film	The Skulls	Nominated
2000	Young Hollywood Award	Male Superstar of Tomorrow	—N/a	Won
2001	Teen Choice Awards	Choice TV Actor	Dawson's Creek	Won
2002	Teen Choice Awards	Choice TV Actor	Dawson's Creek	Nominated
2003	Teen Choice Awards	Choice TV Actor	Dawson's Creek	Nominated
2005	Ft. Lauderdale International Film Festival	Best Actor	Aurora Borealis	Won
2006	Hollywood Film Festival	Best Ensemble of the Year	Bobby	Won
2006	Satellite Awards	Best Actor – Motion Picture	Aurora Borealis	Nominated
2007	Screen Actors Guild Awards	Outstanding Performance by a Cast in a Motion Picture	Bobby	Nominated
2009	Teen Choice Awards	Choice Actor Fantasy/Sci-Fi	Fringe	Nominated
2010	Genie Awards	Best Performance by an Actor in a Leading Role	One Week	Won
2010	Teen Choice Awards	Choice Actor Fantasy/Sci-Fi	Fringe	Nominated
2011	Teen Choice Awards	Choice Actor Fantasy/Sci-Fi	Fringe	Nominated
2012	Teen Choice Awards	Choice Actor Fantasy/Sci-Fi	Fringe	Nominated
2013	Saturn Awards	Best Actor on Television	Fringe	Nominated
2016	People's Choice Awards	Favorite Premium Cable TV Actor	The Affair	Nominated
2017	People's Choice Awards	Favorite Premium Cable TV Actor	The Affair	Nominated
2018	Drama League Awards	Distinguished Performance Award	Children of a Lesser God	Nominated
2022	Critics' Choice Television Awards	Best Actor in a Movie/Miniseries	Dr. Death	Nominated
