= Teresa Hannigan =

Canadian film editor

Teresa Hannigan is a Canadian film and television editor, most noted as a four-time Gemini Award and Canadian Screen Award nominee for Best Picture Editing in a Dramatic Program or Series. She was nominated at the 19th Gemini Awards in 2004 for her work on The Eleventh Hour episode "The Missionary Position", at the 24th Gemini Awards in 2009 for the Flashpoint episode "Scorpio", at the 1st Canadian Screen Awards in 2013 for the Rookie Blue episode "Every Man", and at the 2nd Canadian Screen Awards in 2014 for the Rookie Blue episode "Poison Pill".

In 2008, Hannigan won the Directors Guild of Canada's award for Best Picture Editing in a Television Movie/Mini-Series for her work on David Wellington's Would Be Kings. In 2010, she was part of the team that won the DGC's Team Award for the film Cairo Time.

In 2006, Hannigan directed and edited the short drama film Snapshots for Henry, which earned her a Genie Award nomination for Best Live Action Short Drama at the 27th Genie Awards in 2007.

Hannigan is a member of the Canadian Cinema Editors honours society.
