= Baruch Ben Haim =

Hakham Baruch Ben Haim ברוך בן חיים

Personal life
- Born: Baruch Mizrahi; November 18, 1921 Jerusalem
- Died: June 2, 2005 (aged 83) Brooklyn, New York
- Buried: Har HaMenuchot
- Spouse: Charlotte Kassin
- Children: Eli; Yaacov; Yehuda; David
- Parent(s): Haim Mizrahi; Miriam Shalom
- Education: Porat Yosef Yeshiva

Religious life
- Religion: Judaism
- Position: Chief Rabbi
- Organisation: Brooklyn Syrian Jewish community
- Began: 1950
- Ended: 2005
- Other: Founder, Shaare Zion Torah Center
- Semikhah: Rabbi Ezra Attiya; Rabbi Ben-Zion Meir Hai Uziel
- Website: https://www.hachambaruch.com

Baruch Ben Haim (Hebrew: ברוך בן חיים; November 18, 1921 – June 2, 2005) was a Sephardi Hakham who served as Chief Rabbi of the Syrian Jewish community in Brooklyn, New York for 55 years. He taught at Magen David Yeshiva and established the Shaare Zion Torah Center at Congregation Shaare Zion. He was a protege of Rabbi Ezra Attiya, rosh yeshiva of Porat Yosef Yeshiva, who trained and dispatched students to leadership positions in Sephardi communities around the world.

== Early life ==
Ben Haim was born in Jerusalem in 1921. He was one of nine children of Haim Mizrahi and Miriam Shalom, both natives of Iraq. The family changed its surname from Mizrahi to Ben Haim ("son of Haim") after Haim Mizrahi's death in 1951 to honor their patriarch.

At age 11 Ben Haim entered Porat Yosef Yeshiva, where he was a member of the so-called "wonder class" of students who went on to become noted Torah scholars and leaders in the Sephardi Jewish world. His classmates included Rabbi Ben Zion Abba Shaul, Rabbi Yehuda Moallem, Rabbi Zion Levy, and Rabbi Ovadia Yosef. Ben Haim was especially close to Yosef, who was his chavruta (study partner) from a young age and with whom he spent up to 15 hours a day engaged in Torah study.

== Rabbinical career ==
Ben Haim received rabbinic ordination from his rosh yeshiva, Rabbi Ezra Attiya, and from the Sephardi Chief Rabbi of Israel, Rabbi Ben-Zion Meir Hai Uziel. For a while he served as a dayan (rabbinical court judge) on the Sephardi Beit Din in Jerusalem, together with Rabbis Attiya and Yehuda Shako. In 1947 he accepted a rabbinical position in an Ashkenazi community in South Africa, which he served for two years.

In 1949 he accepted the position of Assistant Chief Rabbi of the Syrian Jewish community in Brooklyn upon the request of Isaac Shalom, president of Brooklyn's Magen David Synagogue, who had asked Rabbi Attiya to send another rabbi. Ben Haim arrived in New York in January 1950. Two months later he became engaged to the daughter of Rabbi Jacob S. Kassin, Chief Rabbi of the Syrian Jewish community in Brooklyn. The couple married in May 1950 and had four sons: Rabbi Eli Ben Haim, former spiritual leader of the Lawrence Avenue Synagogue, Rabbi Dr Yaacov Ben Haim of Congregation Shaare Zion, Rabbi Dr Yehuda Ben Haim, and David Ben Haim.

Ben Haim served as assistant rabbi to Kassin in Congregation Shaare Zion, where he made a number of important contributions to the synagogue, including the establishment of the Shaare Zion Torah Center to educate the community in subjects of Torah and Jewish law. He officiated at thousands of weddings as well as bar mitzvahs and funerals. He also taught in Magen David Yeshiva for three decades, beginning in the early 1950s. He spent several months each summer in Deal and Bradley Beach, New Jersey, addressing and strengthening the Syrian Jewish community in those locales. As a public service, he recorded the Hebrew Psalms with the proper ta'amim (cantillation). The recordings were released to the public during his lifetime, and have been posted online after his death on the DailyTehillim.com website.

Ben Haim was a respected leader in the Brooklyn Syrian Jewish community. He displayed compassion for every Jew, greeting old and young with a smile. He willingly mediated domestic disputes and assisted others. He also gave blessings whenever asked.

== Final years ==
In 2003 Ben Haim became seriously ill and was flown to Cleveland for an operation. At that time, the name Raphael was added to his Hebrew name (Baruch Raphael ben Miriam) as a prayer for a complete recovery. He recovered from the operation, but his health deteriorated beginning in April 2005, and he died on June 2, 2005.

His funeral was held at three of the Brooklyn Syrian Jewish community's leading institutions: Congregation Shaare Zion, Magen David Yeshiva, and Magen David Synagogue. Then his body was flown to Israel, where he was eulogized at Porat Yosef Yeshiva by Rabbis Ovadia Yosef, Eliyahu Bakshi-Doron, Shlomo Amar, Yehuda Moallem, and Moshe Tzadka. He was buried on Har HaMenuchot in Jerusalem.

== Sources ==
- "Special Commemorative Section: Hacham Baruch zt"l" (PDF). Community Magazine. July 2005. Archived from the original (PDF) on 2013-09-29.
- Paid death notices in The New York Times
