= Eliyahu Ben Haim =

American rabbi, YU Rosh Yeshiva

Rabbi Eliyahu Ben Chaim
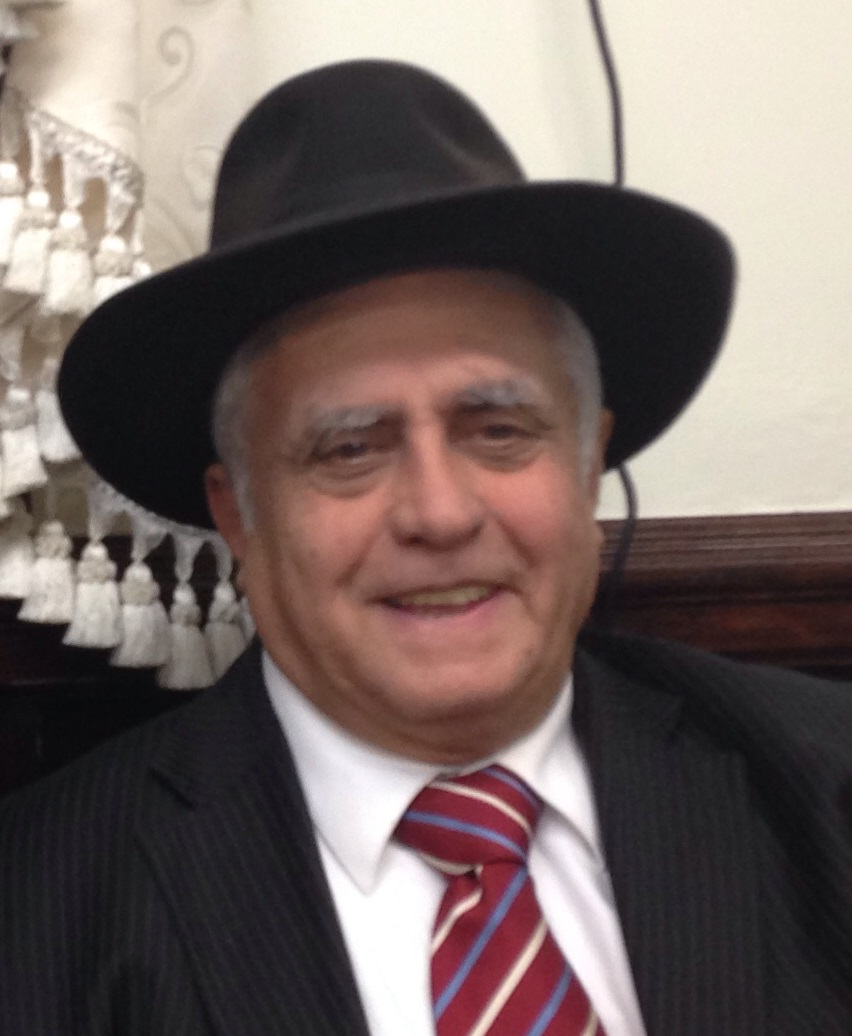

Personal life
- Born: Eliyahu Ben-Chaim; August 4, 1940 (age 86) Jerusalem, Mandatory Palestine
- Parent(s): Saleh (Betzalel) Ben Chaim; Simcha Ben Chaim
- Education: Porat Yosef Yeshiva
- Occupation: Rabbi, Talmudic scholar, judge, lecturer, recognized halakhic authority

Religious life
- Religion: Judaism
- Denomination: Orthodox Judaism

Jewish leader
- Position: Chief Rabbi
- Synagogue: Sha'are Shalom (United Mashadi Community of America)
- Yeshiva: Yeshivat Rabbeinu Yitzchak Elchanan
- Organisation: Badatz Mekor Haim
- Residence: Great neck, NY
- Semikhah: Rabbi Salman Hugi Aboudi, Rabbi Ezra Attia, Rabbi Yaakov Ades, Rabbi Eliezer Waldenberg, Rabbi Ovadia Hedaya

Eliyahu Ben Chaim (born August 4, 1940) is a Sephardi rabbi, Talmudic scholar, and Orthodox halachist. He is the Av Beit Din (head of the rabbinical court) of Mekor Haim in Queens, New York, and a prominent leader of New York's Sephardi Jewish community.

== Early life ==
Eliyahu Ben Haim was born in Jerusalem, Mandatory Palestine. His father was from Hamedan, Iran and his mother's father from the Hasidoff family of Georgia. In his youth, he studied at Yeshivat Porat Yosef, where he was recognized as a prodigy with a distinguished memory. He attended the shiur of Rabbi Ben Zion Abba Shaul and received semicha (rabbinic ordination) from Rabbi Ezra Attia and other rabbis. At the age of 17, he was tested on the entire Shulchan Aruch. In Porat Yosef, Rabbi Ben Haim fostered a close relationship with Rabbi Ovadia Yosef, who studied Even Ha'ezer with him.

== Community work ==
In 1962, at the age of 22, he was appointed maggid shiur at Yeshiva Beth Harashal in Jerusalem. Five years later, he became the rosh yeshiva of that yeshiva. In 1973 he began teaching at the Lifshitz Teachers Seminary in Jerusalem. In 1975 he was sent by the Jewish Agency to serve as a rabbi in Tehran, where he hosted Rabbi Ovadia Yosef and Rabbi Ben Tzion Abba Shaul during their respective historic trips to Iran. In Tehran, Ben Haim began serving the local community of Mashadi Jews as a rabbi and hazzan.

In 1979, in the wake of the Iranian Revolution, he went with his family to the United States and served as the chief rabbi of the Mashadi Persian Jewish community of Long Island (UMJCA). Since 1993, he has lectured at Yeshivat Rabbeinu Yitzchak Elchanan (RIETS) at Yeshiva University.

Ben Haim was considered a close friend of Mordechai Eliyahu and delivered many eulogies for him. Ben Haim runs the Beth Din Mekor Haim, where he addresses the needs of the Queens Jewish community in matters of marriage, divorce, conversion, civil law, and kosher supervision. He also runs a kollel affiliated with the Beth Din.

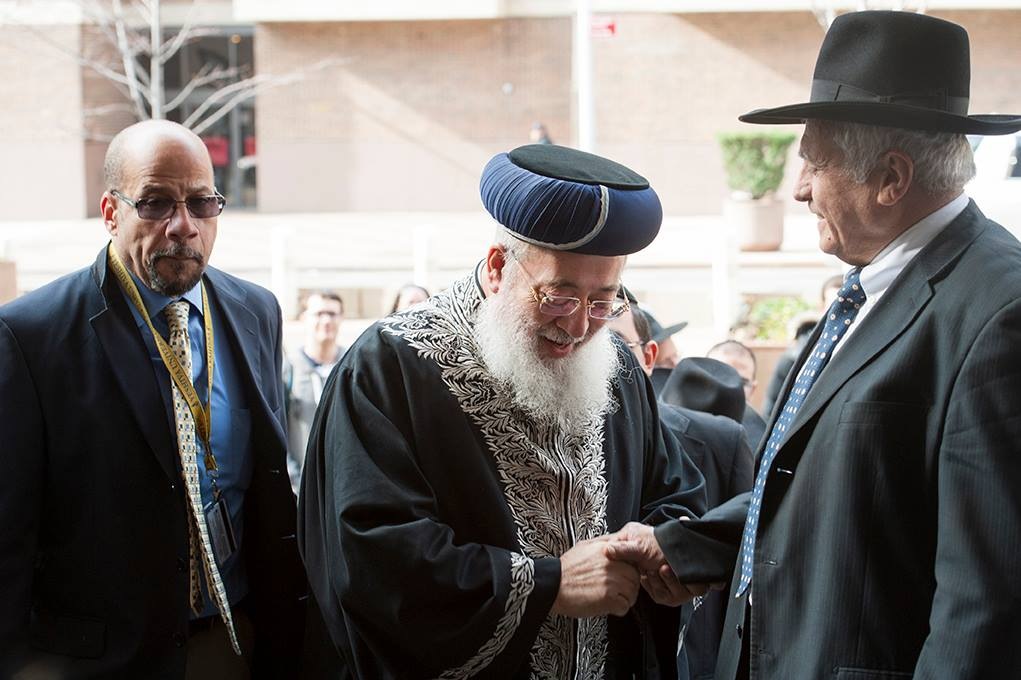
Rabbi Ben-Chaim welcoming Rabbi Amar

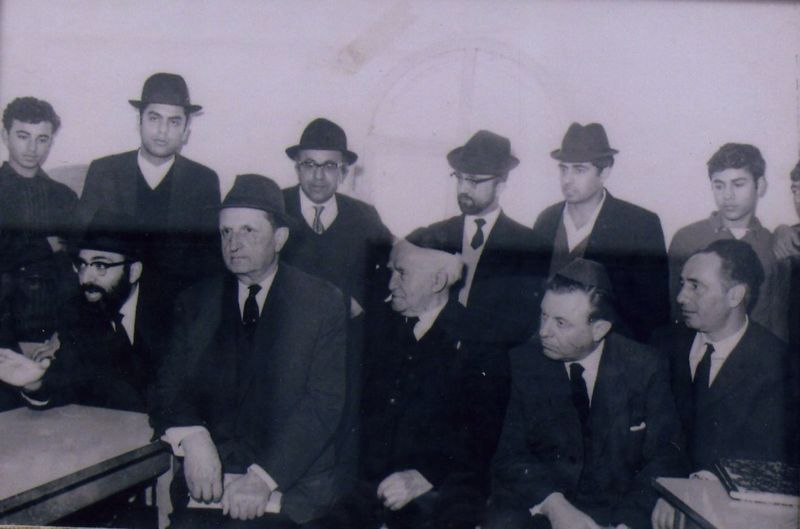
Ben Haim (top row, second from the left) with Shimon Peres, Teddy Kollek, and David Ben Gurion (bottom row) shortly after the Six-Day War (1967). This picture hangs in the Old City of Jerusalem's Four Sephardic Synagogues

== Beliefs ==
Rabbi Ben Haim, like his teacher, Ovadia Yosef, advocates using the Kochah DeHeterah (power of leniency) to assist every Jew in need, especially agunot, women whose husbands refuse to provide a get (Jewish bill of divorce).

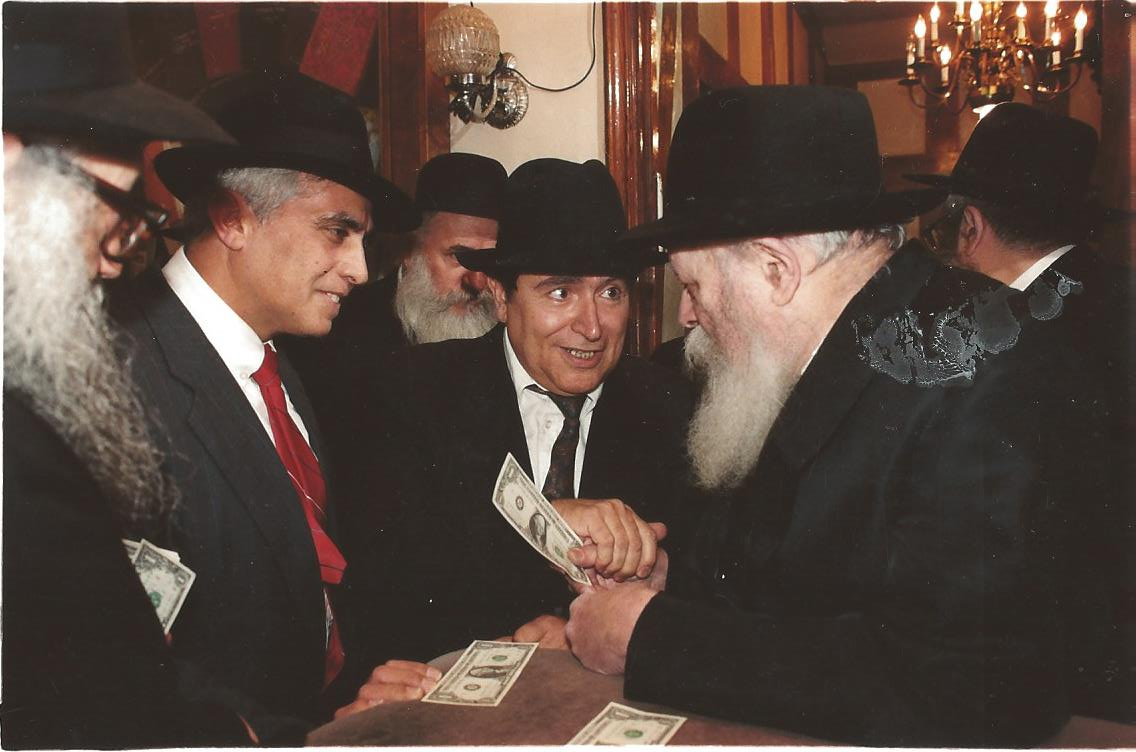
Rabbi Eliyahu Ben Chaim, Rosh Yeshiva at YU and Av Bet Din in Queens, with The Lubavitcher Rebbe, Rabbi Menachem Mendel Schneerson

== Works ==
Ben Haim's students have released publications containing his rulings. They include:

1. Shenot Haim: Laws and Customs of Mourning in Accordance with the Mashadi Jewish Tradition, by Rabbi Mosheh Aziz and Avraham Ben-Haim, Independent Publisher, Nov 21, 2018, ISBN 9781532395581
2. טהרת חיים: Laws and Customs of Family Purity in Accordance with the Sephardic Jewish Tradition, by Rabbi Mosheh Aziz, September 1, 2020, ISBN 979-8677304910

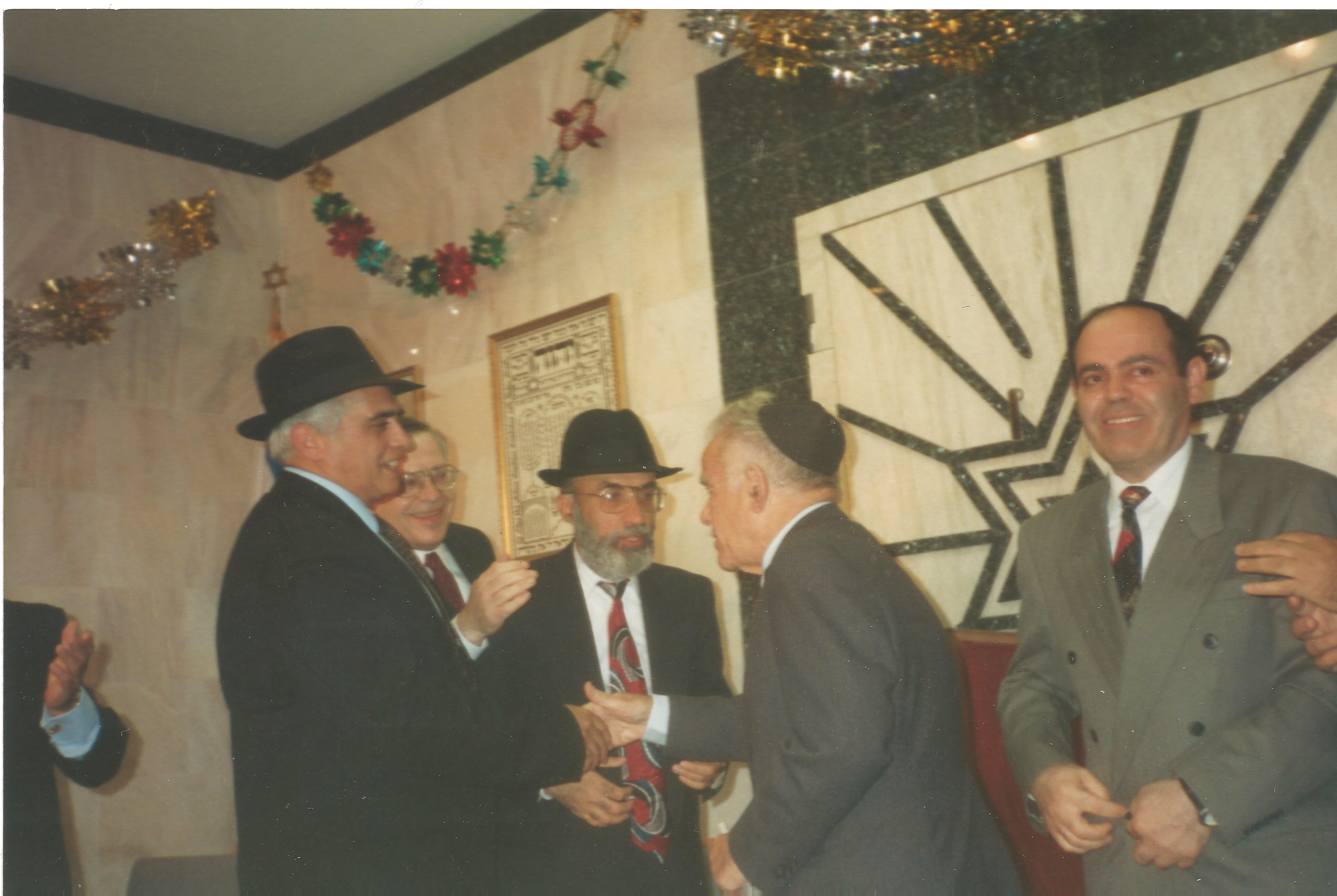
Rabbi Eliyahu Ben Chaim, Rosh Yeshiva at YU and Av Bet Din in Queens, with Yitzchak Shamir

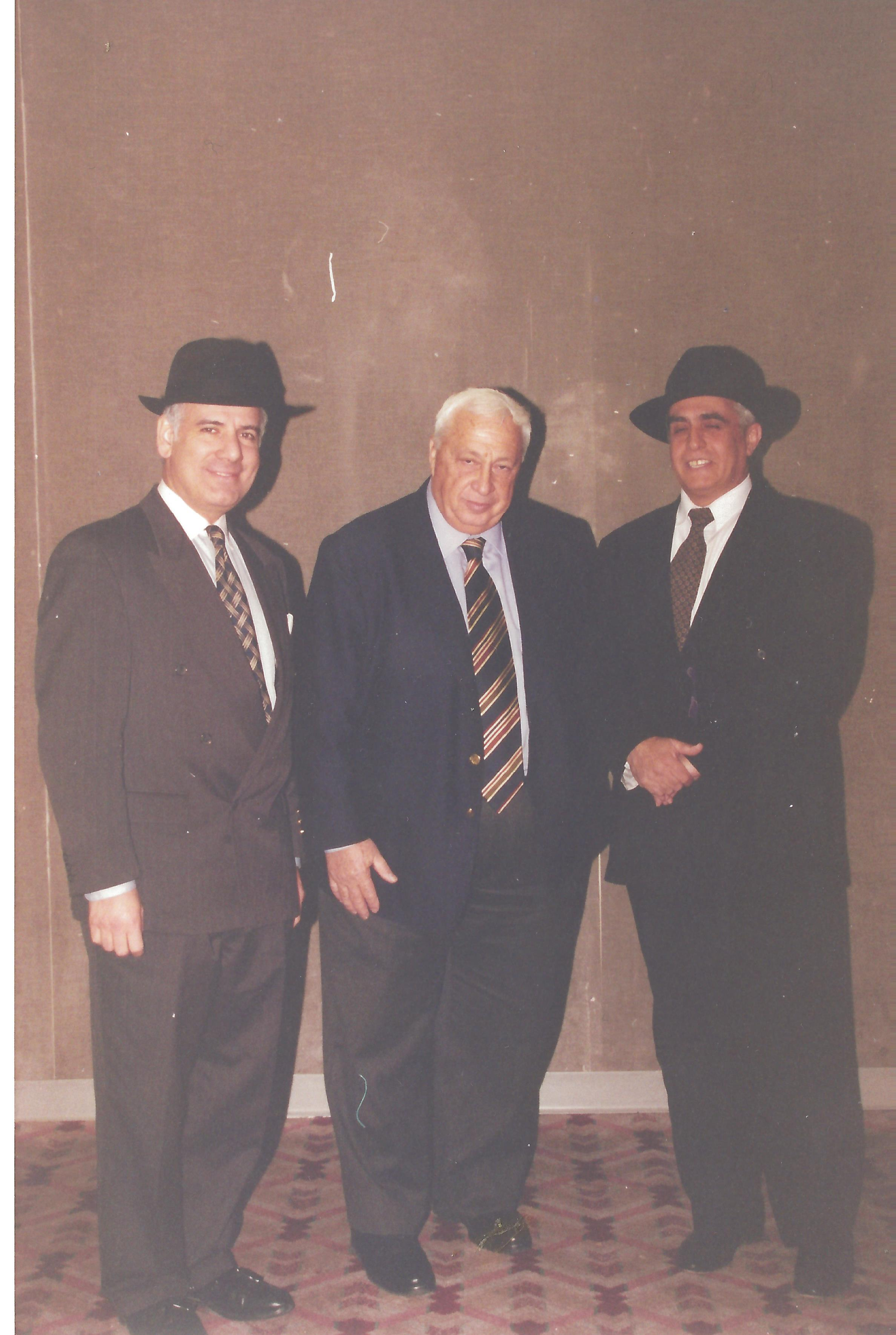
Rabbi Eliyahu Ben Chaim, Rosh Yeshiva at YU and Av Bet Din in Queens, with Prime Minister Ariel Sharon
