= Yehoshua Sharbani =

Yehoshua Sharbani (died December 16, 1972). Rabbi Sharbani was Kabbalist and Rabbi in the Baka neighborhood of Jerusalem.

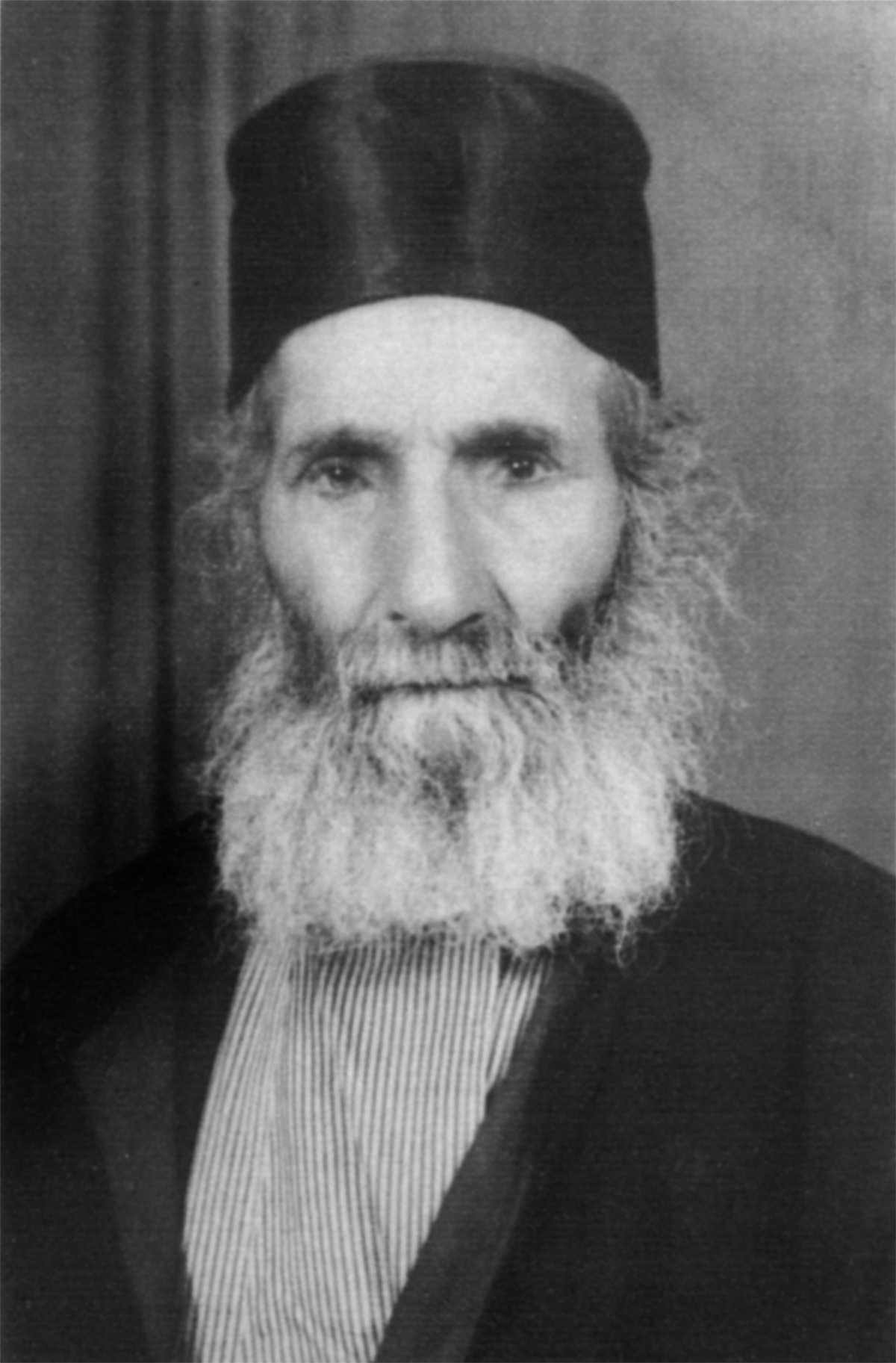

== Biography ==
Yehoshua Sharbani was born in Bagdad, Iraq, to Yitzchak and Aziza Sharbani. Yehoshua studied under many illustrious Hakhamim including the Ben Ish Chai. In turn Rabbi Sharbani became the teacher of David Chaim, grandson of the Ben Ish Chai. In 1903, Rabbi Sharbani and his wife Masouda move to Israel. They settled in Jerusalem where he began to teach in Yeshivat Shoshanim L'David in the Bukharim Quarter. With the Establishment of the Porat Yosef Yeshiva, Rabbi Sharbani began to learn and teach there among many great scholars and Kabbalists. He studied Kabbalah alongside Rabbi Salman Eliyahu, and assisted in the publication of his book "Kerem Shlomo" by completing the missing passages in the manuscripts from his memory. He used to fast from Saturday to Saturday. He studied Gemara with Rabbi Yaakov Chaim Sofer.

He died on December 16, 1972 (11 Tevet 5733) and was buried on the Mount of Olives. According to sources, he was at least a hundred years old. His name was immortalized by naming a street after him in the Ramat Shlomo neighborhood of Jerusalem.

== Family ==
Of his sons: Rabbi David Sharbani, was Sephardic Chief Rabbi of Colombia. Rabbi Shaul served as a judge (Dayan) alongside Rabbi Ezra Attia in the Sephardic court in Jerusalem. Rabbi Yosef Sharbani. Rabbi Shlomo used to teach at the Porat Yosef Yeshiva.

Among his grandchildren: Rabbi Yehuda Mualem, Udi Sharbani, Rabbi Reuven Sharbani, Hadassah Masuda, who married Rabbi Ben-Zion Abba-Shaul, and Clara, who married Rabbi Shabtai Aton.

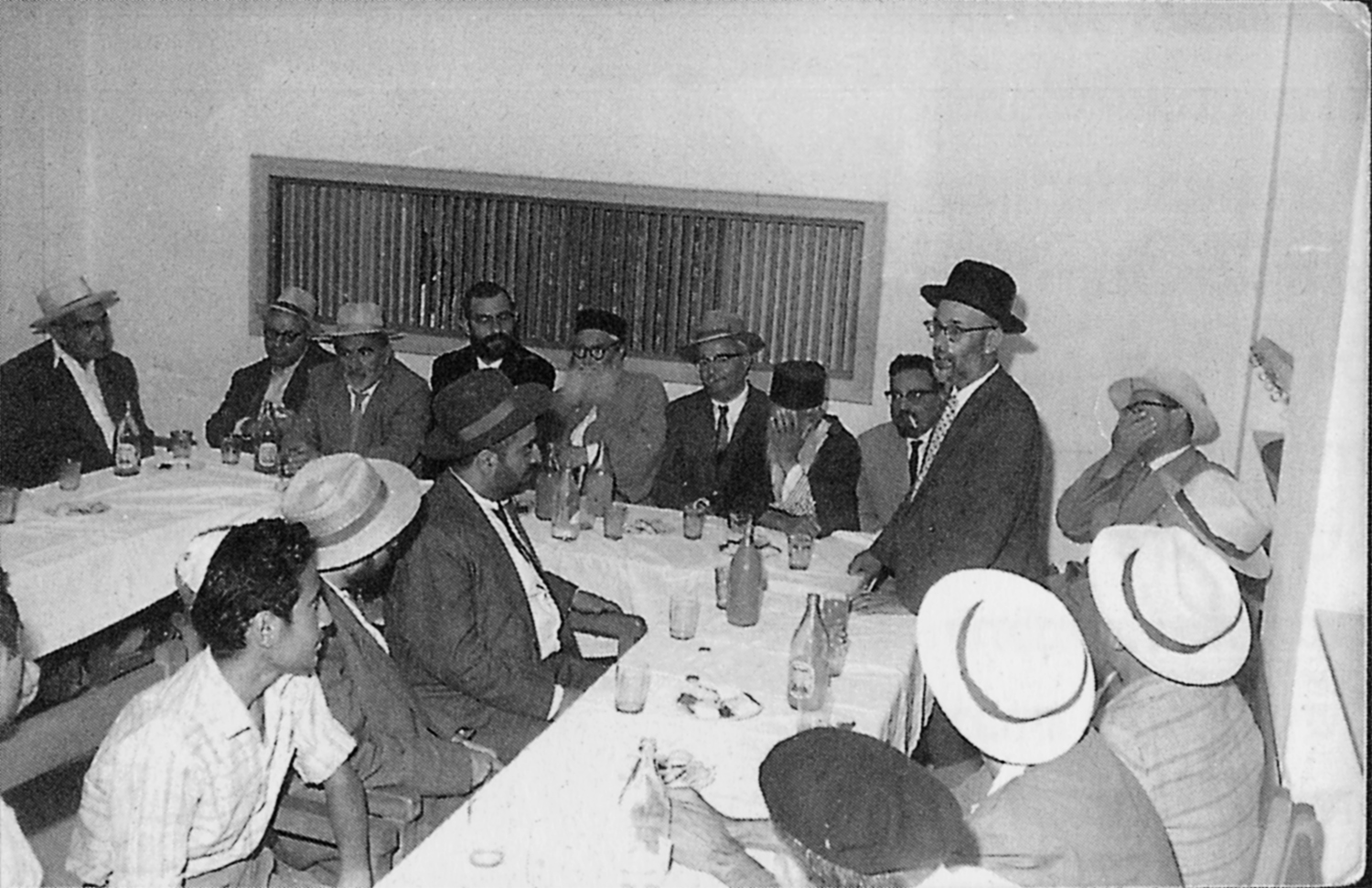
