= Harry Shapiro =

Harry Shapiro may refer to:

- Harry Shapiro (author), author, journalist and lecturer on the subject of drugs
- Harry Shapiro (criminal) (born 1966), anti-Israeli terrorist
- Harry L. Shapiro (1902–1990), American author, eugenicist, and professor of anthropology

== See also ==
- Harold Shapiro (disambiguation)
