= Yaakov Ades =

Israeli Sephardi rabbi and rosh yeshiva

Rabbi Yaakov Ades יעקב עדס
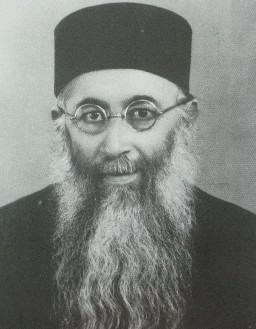
- Ades in 1952

Personal life
- Born: Yaakov Hai Zion Ades; February 24, 1898 Jerusalem, Ottoman Empire
- Died: July 19, 1963 (aged 65) Jerusalem, Israel
- Buried: Har HaMenuchot
- Spouse: Haya Esther Harari-Raful
- Children: 5
- Parent(s): Avraham Haim Ades; Tzalha Swed
- Education: Porat Yosef Yeshiva

Religious life
- Religion: Judaism
- Denomination: Orthodox Judaism

Jewish leader
- Yeshiva: Porat Yosef Yeshiva
- Organisation: Israel Rabbinate High Court of Appeals
- Other: Dayan, Sephardic Beit Din of Jerusalem (1944–1955)

Yaakov Hai Zion Ades (Hebrew: יעקב חי ציון עדס; February 24, 1898 – July 19, 1963), also spelled Adas or Adess, was a Sephardi, and Rabbinical High Court judge. As rosh yeshiva (dean) of Porat Yosef Yeshiva in Jerusalem, he educated thousands of students, including Ovadia Yosef, the Sephardic Chief Rabbi of Israel, and Ben Zion Abba Shaul, rosh yeshiva of Porat Yosef.

== Family and early life ==
Ades' parents were Rabbi Avraham Haim Ades (1848–1925) and Tzalha, daughter of Rabbi Moshe Swed, Rav of Aleppo. In Aleppo, his father was regarded as a great Hakham, kabbalist, author, and teacher of future Sephardic Torah leaders such as Rabbi Yosef Yedid Halevi, Rabbi Ezra Chamawi, Rabbi Yaakov Katzin, Rabbi Shlomo Laniado, and Rabbi Ezra Attiya. Upon his parents' aliyah to Israel in 1896, his father helped found Rechovot Hanahar, a yeshiva for kabbalists in the Bukharim quarter, and served on the beit din of the Aram Soba (Aleppo) community.

Ades was born in Jerusalem, the youngest of four sons. He received his early education from his father, but at age 12 was sent to study in Yeshiva Ohel Moed under Rabbis Yosef Yedid Halevi and Shlomo Laniado. Four years later, in 1914, the drafting of students by the Turkish army in World War I prompted many students to flee to Egypt and Bukhara and the yeshiva disbanded. Ades managed to remain in Jerusalem during the war and rejoined the yeshiva when it reopened in 1918.

On March 7, 1919 Ades married Haya Esther, daughter of Rabbi Ezra Harari-Raful, a leading rabbi of Aleppo and founder of Yeshivat Ohel Moed. In 1920, at the age of 22, Ades was asked to serve as a maggid shiur (Torah lecturer) in Yeshiva Ohel Moed. Ades continued in this position until 1923, when the yeshiva closed and its staff and students relocated to the newly opened Porat Yosef Yeshiva in the Old City of Jerusalem.

Ades taught at Porat Yosef for the next 20 years, raising thousands of students. Every day he delivered a shiur (lecture) on Talmudic topics in the morning and a shiur on the Tur and Choshen Mishpat in the afternoon. All of his unpublished Torah writings from that period were destroyed when the Jordanian Arab Legion set fire to the yeshiva during their occupation of the Old City in 1948.

== Rabbinical court judge ==
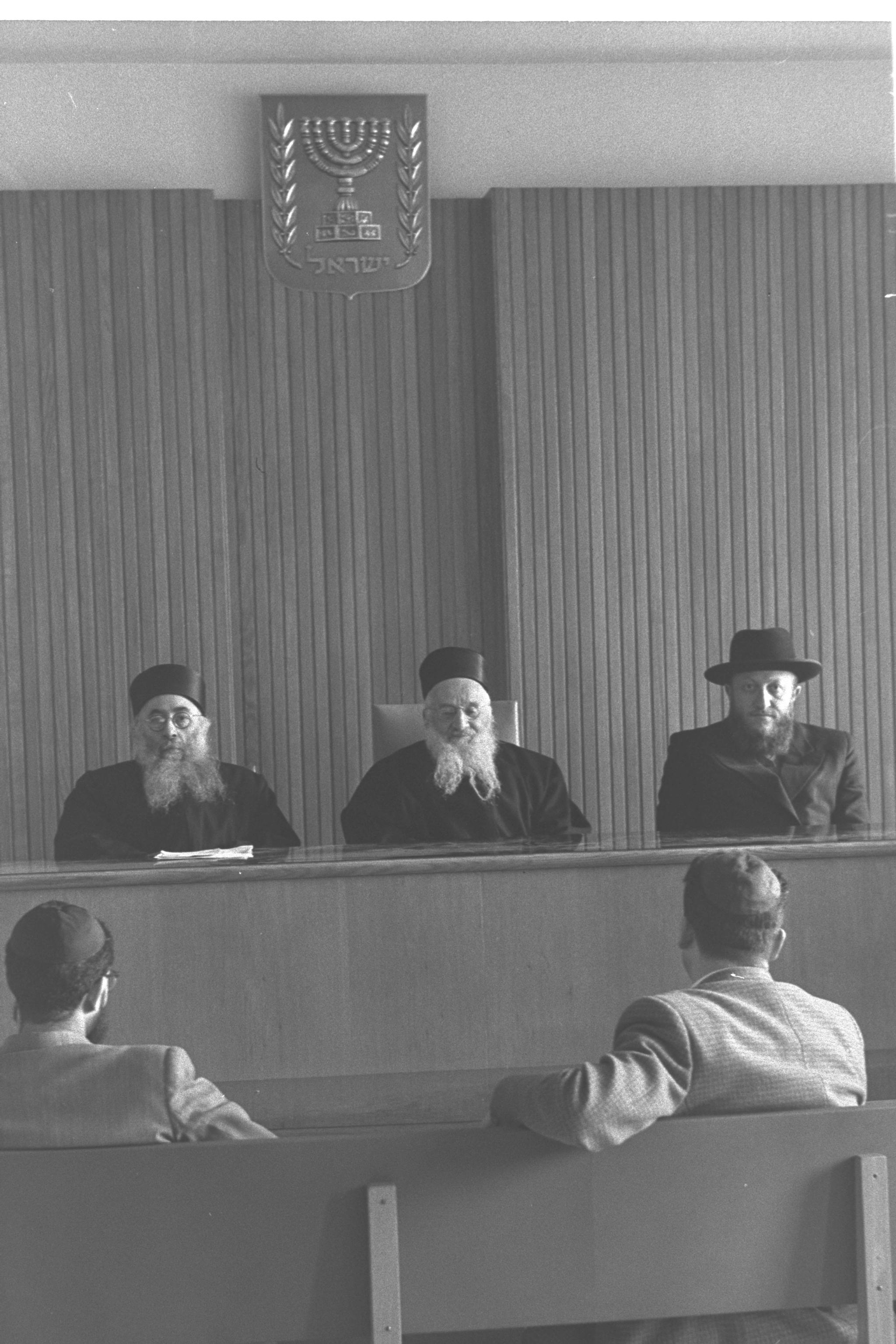
Rabbinical High Court, 1959. From left: Ades, Ovadia Hedaya, Bezalel Zolty.

In 1935 Ades, then a senior maggid shiur at Yeshivat Ohel Moed, was offered a seat on the Sephardic Beit Din of Jerusalem by the Rishon Le-zion, Rabbi Yaakov Meir. Ades filled this role until 1943. In 1944, he was asked to sit on the Sephardic Beit Din of Tel Aviv, and at the same time was appointed as the Rav of a Syrian synagogue in Tel Aviv. He would spend the entire week in Tel Aviv, only returning to his home in Jerusalem for Shabbat.

In 1945 he was appointed as av beit din of the Sephardic Beit Din of Jerusalem. In 1953 he was asked to serve as Chief Rabbi of Israel, but declined. In 1955 he accepted a seat on the Beit Din HaGadol (Rabbinical High Court), first as a dayan and later as av beit din. His fellow dayanim included Rabbi Betzalel Zolty, Ashkenazi Chief Rabbi of Jerusalem, and Rabbi Yosef Shalom Elyashiv. Ades presided on the High Court until his death in 1963.

== Personal ==
Ades and his wife had seven sons and two daughters.

== Death and legacy ==
Ades died on July 19, 1963 (27 Tammuz 5723) after a four-month illness. He was buried in the Sephardic rabbinical section on Har HaMenuchot.

His son founded Yeshivat Kol Yaakov in the Bayit Vegan neighborhood of Jerusalem in his memory.
