= David Sharbani =

Colombian rabbi (1920–1985)

Rabbi David Sharbani
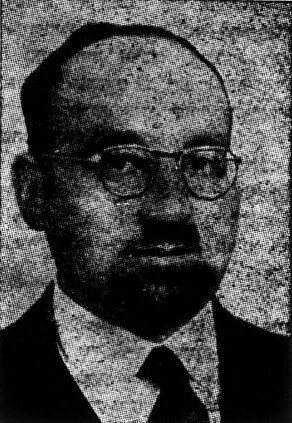
- 1962 — in "Doshlim"
- Title: Sephardic Chief Rabbi of Colombia, 1950–1978

Personal life
- Born: August 16, 1920 Jerusalem, Mandatory Palestine
- Died: August 6, 1985 (aged 64) Miami, Florida
- Parent(s): Rabbi Yehoshua Sharbani and Masouda Sharbani

Religious life
- Religion: Judaism
- Denomination: Haredi

Jewish leader
- Predecessor: Rabbi Miguel Attias
- Successor: Rabbi Yehuda Benhamou

David Sharbani (Hebrew: דוד שרבני; 16 August 1920 – 6 August 1985) was a Sephardic Chief Rabbi of Colombia. He served as the Sephardic Chief Rabbi of Colombia from the early 1950s to 1978. Following his tenure, Rabbi Sharbani moved to Miami, Florida, United States of America. Sharbani died in Miami on August 6, 1985. He was 64 years old.

== Early life ==
David Sharbani was born on 16 August 1920 in Jerusalem, Mandatory Palestine, to Kabbalist, Hakham Yehoshua Sharbani and Masuda Sharbani. The Sharbani family originated from Iraq and has a long line of prominent rabbinic figures. David's parents immigrated to Jerusalem, Ottoman Syria from Baghdad, Iraq in 1903. Rabbi Sharbani studied in famous Porat Yosef Yeshiva. Rabbi Sharbani received Semikhah from the Chazon Ish.

== Colombia ==
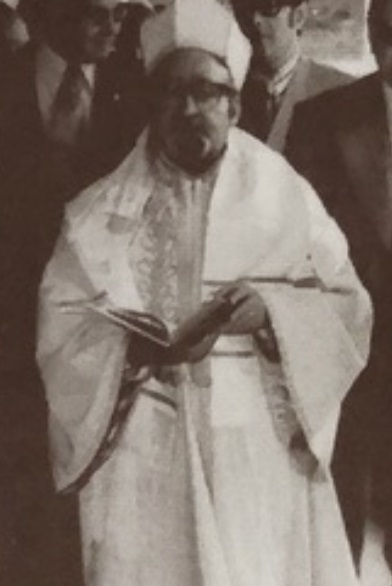
Sharbani as Chief Rabbi of Bogotá

Sharbani was the first Sephardic rabbi to head the first Sephardic synagogue in Bogotá, Colombia in 1952. In 1952, the philanthropist Ovadia Shayo visited the Porat Yosef Yeshiva and asked Sephardic Chief Rabbi of Israel, Rabbi Ben-Zion Meir Hai Uziel to send a rabbi to his congregation in Colombia, Rabbi Ben-Zion Meir Hai Uziel recommended him Rabbi David Sharbani and indeed Rabbi David was appointed the chief rabbi of Colombia, his seat was the city of Bogotá.

In Colombia, he established Talmud Torah, a branch of Bnei Akiva, served as president of the World Hebrew Alliance there, was active in the Zionist Organization, and served as a lecturer at the National University of Colombia in the Hebrew department. After a period he was offered the rabbinate in the city of Tel Aviv, Rabbi David refused the offer. Rabbi Sharbani was connected with great Rabbinic leaders of the world including rabbi Moshe Feinstein. Rabbi Sharbani served as a support to the hostages held during the 1980 Dominican Republic Embassy siege in Bogotá, 1980, by M-19 guerrillas.

== Publications ==
Rabbi Sharbani published a Haggadah for Passover, containing Hebrew, Spanish and English. The Haggadah was published in 1960 and commissioned artwork from Holocaust survivor and Colombian cartoonist Peter Aldor.

== Burial ==
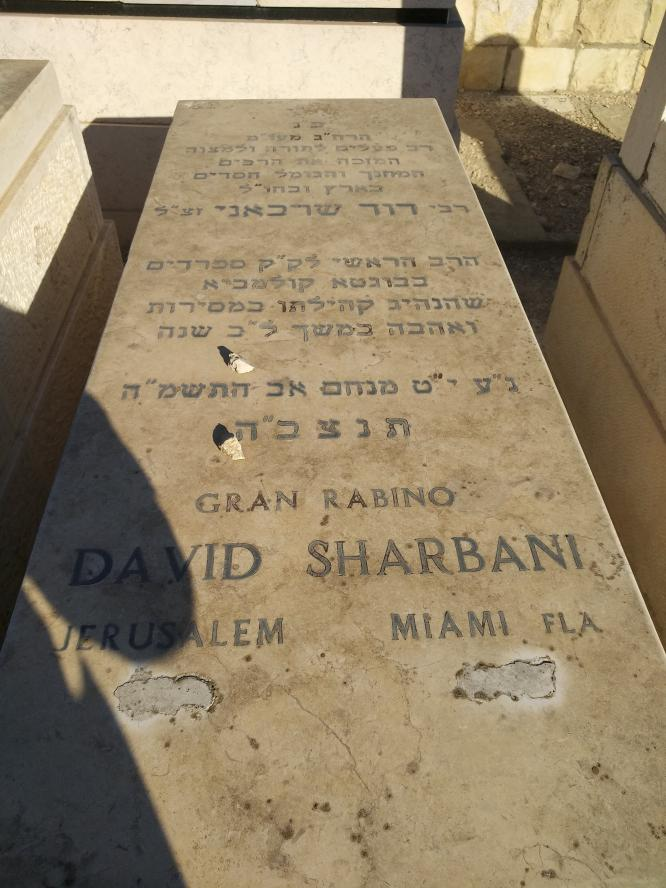
David Sharbani's grave

Gran Rabino Sharbani is buried on the Mount of Olives in Jerusalem in block החסידים (ספרדים), plot ב.ל.גוש ו ,סונסינו מול ט.ע, row 08, spot 310.
