= Yehuda Tzadka =

Sephardi rabbi

Rabbi Yehuda Tzadka יהודה צדקה
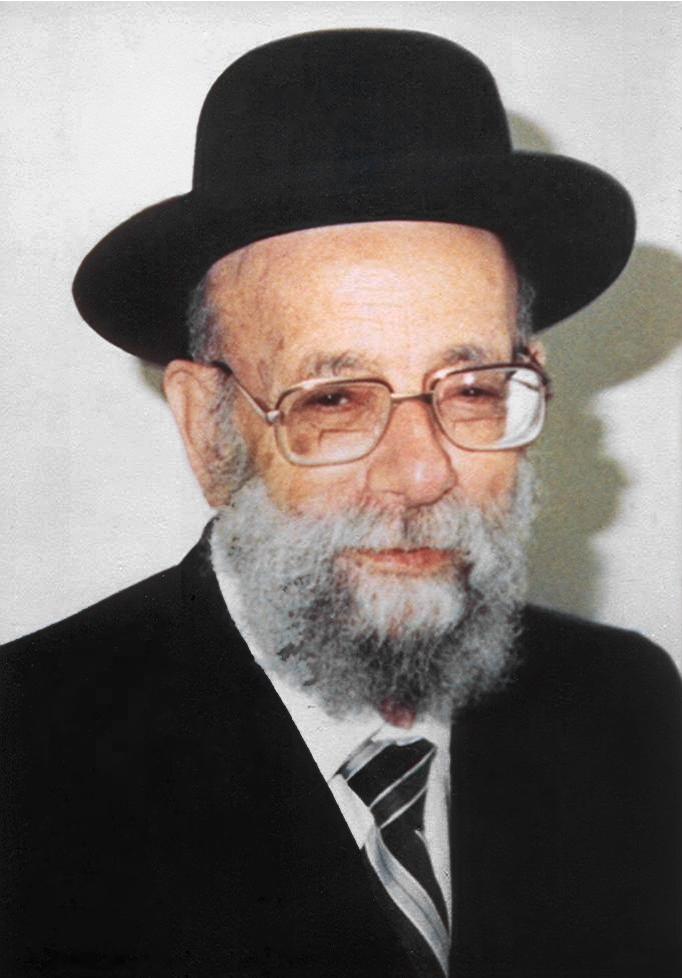

Personal life
- Born: Yehuda Yehoshua Tzadka; 13 January 1910 Jerusalem, Ottoman Palestine
- Died: 20 October 1991 (aged 81) Jerusalem, Israel
- Buried: Sanhedria Cemetery, Jerusalem
- Spouse: Fahima Batat; Tamar Asuderi
- Children: Moshe; 4 other sons 2 daughters
- Parent(s): Shaul and Simcha Tzadka
- Education: Porat Yosef Yeshiva

Religious life
- Religion: Judaism

Jewish leader
- Predecessor: Rabbi Ezra Attiya
- Successor: Rabbi Ben Zion Abba Shaul
- Yeshiva: Porat Yosef Yeshiva
- Position: Rosh yeshiva
- Began: May 1970

Yehuda Yehoshua Tzadka (Hebrew: יהודה צדקה; 13 January 1910 – 20 October 1991) was a respected Sephardi rabbi and rosh yeshiva of the Porat Yosef Yeshiva in Jerusalem. He became a student in the yeshiva after his bar mitzvah, and continued to study and teach there for almost 70 years.

== Early life and education ==
Tzadka was born in Jerusalem to Shaul Tzadka, a Jewish merchant from Baghdad who had immigrated to Ottoman Palestine around 1900 with his wife, Simcha, a niece of the Ben Ish Chai. The family lived in the Beit Yisrael neighborhood, and young Yehuda attended Talmud Torah Bnei Tzion in the Bukharim Quarter. After his bar mitzvah he enrolled in Porat Yosef Yeshiva in Jerusalem's Old City, which had opened a year earlier. Following the death of rosh yeshiva Shlomo Laniado, Tzadka became a student of the new rosh yeshiva, Rabbi Ezra Attiya, from whom he continued to learn for the next 45 years.

Tzadka was a diligent student who rose to the top of his class. He studied by day in the yeshiva and at night in the Be'er Sheva synagogue in Beis Yisrael. Every Friday night he would study in the Shoshanim L'David Synagogue, where Sephardi talmidei chachamim (Torah sages) congregated.

== Talmudic lecturer ==
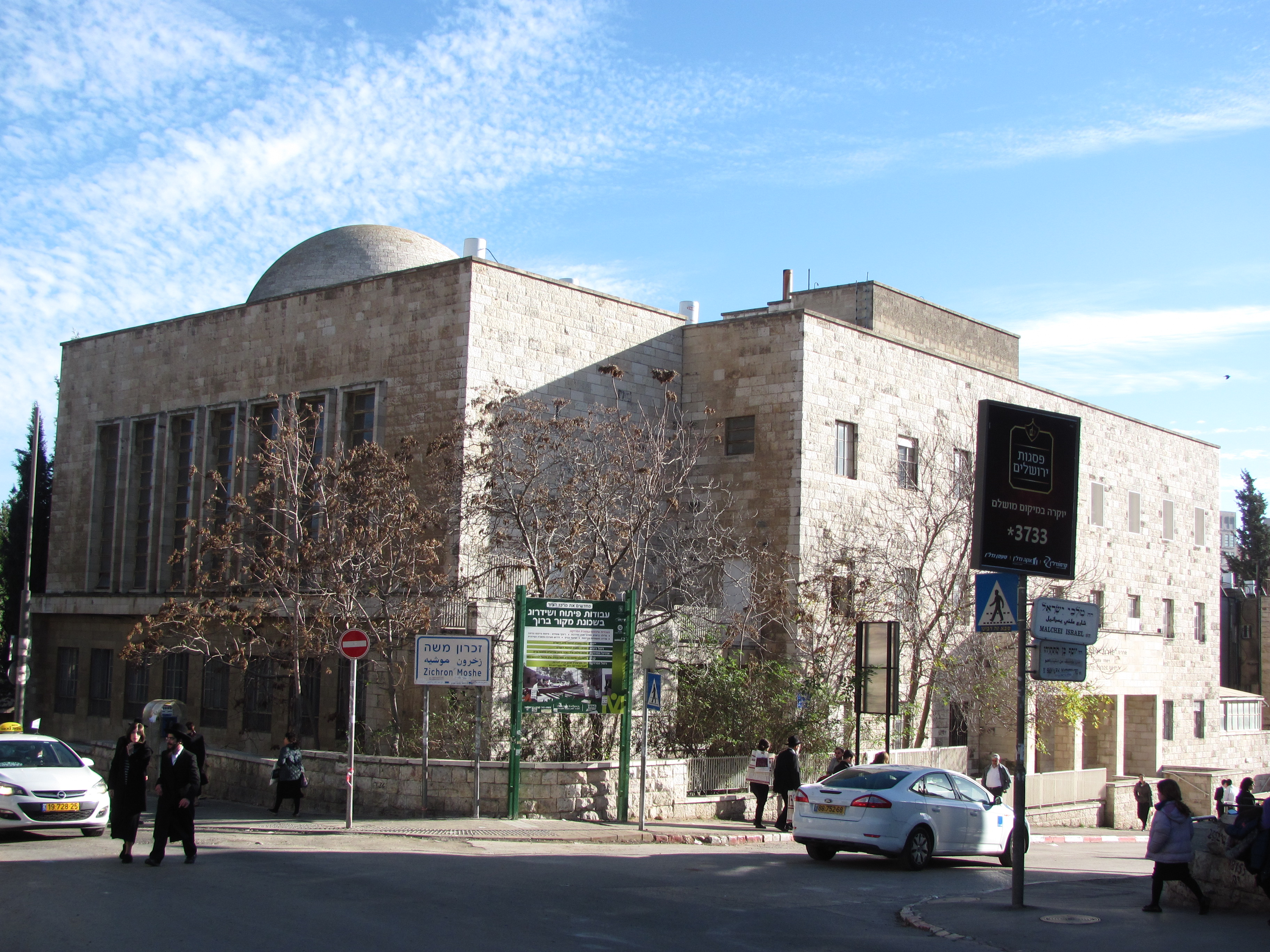
Geula branch of Porat Yosef Yeshiva

In 1937 Attiya suggested Tzadka as a replacement for a senior Talmudic lecturer who was unable to continue teaching. Tzadka's first class included Rabbi Ovadia Yosef, Rabbi Ben Zion Abba Shaul, Rabbi Yehuda Moallem, Rabbi Baruch Ben Haim, and Rabbi Ezra Ades, all of whom would go on to leadership positions in the Sephardi Torah world. Tzadka taught in classic Sephardi style, focusing on the Talmudic commentaries of the Maharsha and the Maharam. Like Attiya, he also emphasized the study of musar (ethics) texts such as Mesillat Yesharim. He distinguished himself as a teacher by his ability to gear each lesson to the level of his students.

Tzadka was characterized by his love of Torah and its sages, and his desire and alacrity to perform mitzvot. He lived simply and encouraged his students to be content without luxuries.

Although he was qualified to serve as a dayan (religious judge), and was asked to join a new regional beth din founded by Rabbi Reuven Katz, Rav of Petah Tikva, Tzadka preferred to keep learning and teaching in Porat Yosef.

During the 1948 Arab-Israeli War, when the Jordanian army captured the Old City, Tzadka supervised groups of Porat Yosef students learning in synagogues in the neighborhoods of Geula, Katamon, and the Bukharim Quarter. After the war, he traveled to England for four months to raise money on behalf of a new yeshiva building, which was erected in the Geula neighborhood in the mid-1950s.

Beyond the walls of the yeshiva, Tzadka was active throughout Israel, encouraging Sephardi families to give their children a Torah education rather than send them to secular schools. He spoke at rallies sponsored by the P'eylim organization on behalf of Torah education for new immigrants, and made the rounds on school registration days, begging parents to register their children in Torah schools. After the founding of the State of Israel, he visited absorption camps in which hundreds of thousands of Sephardi Jews who had left or been expelled from Arab countries were living, urging parents not to send their children to secular schools and encouraging established communities to open Torah schools for immigrant children.

When Attiya died in May 1970, the yeshiva directors asked Tzadka to become the new rosh yeshiva. He agreed, but when he saw a new sign on the door of his classroom: "Rabbi Yehuda Tzadka, Rosh Yeshiva", he insisted that it be taken down and refused to be called by that title.

== Later years ==
In 1984 he published the sefer Kol Yehuda (The Voice of Yehuda), a book of halakha and aggadah incorporating his approach to all matters of life.

In his later years he suffered a series of heart attacks, but was able to recover and return to his teaching. Even while hospitalized, he continued his practice of rising at midnight for Tikkun Chatzot and praying vasikin (the sunrise service). During one hospitalization, he was visited by Rabbi Elazar Shach, who found him lying in a bed in the intensive-care unit with a sefer, engrossed in Torah study.

He suffered his last heart attack during the night of the Fast of Gedaliah in 1991 and was taken to hospital. Two weeks later he suffered a stroke and lapsed into a coma. He died on 20 October 1991 (12 Cheshvan 5752) and was buried in the Sanhedria Cemetery in a family plot.

He was succeeded as rosh yeshiva by Rabbi Ben Zion Abba Shaul. After the latter's death in 1998, Tzadka's son, Rabbi Moshe Tzadka, was named rosh yeshiva of the Geula branch of Porat Yosef Yeshiva.

== Family ==
Tzadka married Fahima Batat, daughter of Rabbi Selim Tzalach Batat of Baghdad, in 1934. They had five sons and two daughters. Fahima died at the age of 57, after which Tzadka remarried, to Tamar Asuderi, who survived him.
