= Isaac Sacca =

Argentinean rabbi

Rabbi Isaac Antebi Sacca
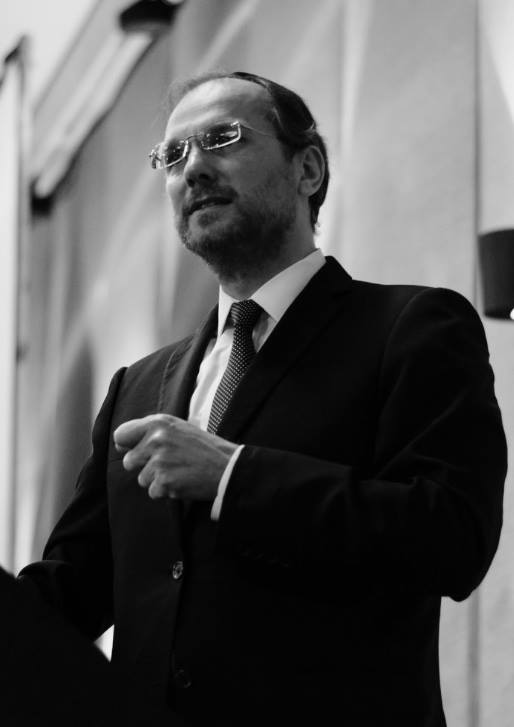
- Title: Chief Rabbi of Buenos Aires

Personal life
- Born: Isaac Antebi Sacca Buenos Aires, Argentina
- Children: 6
- Education: Porat Yosef Yeshiva; Yechave Daat Bet Midrash

Religious life
- Religion: Judaism
- Denomination: Orthodox

Jewish leader
- Other: President of Menora
- Residence: Buenos Aires
- Semikhah: Ovadia Yosef

Rabbi Isaac Antebi Sacca (Hebrew: יצחק ענתבי סקה; born 1964) is the Sephardi Chief Rabbi of Buenos Aires, as well as the founder and president of Menora, an organization for Jewish youth.

== Biography ==
=== Early life and education ===
Rabbi Sacca was born in Buenos Aires into a Jewish family from Aleppo and Eastern Europe. He studied at Yesod Hadat, a community in Buenos Aires that keeps Aleppo's Jewish traditions. There, he became a distinguished student of Chacham Yitzhak Chehebar, the Chief Rabbi of Argentina.

From 1981 to 1984, Rabbi Isaac Sacca studied at Porat Yosef Yeshiva, located in the Old City of Jerusalem. From 1985 to 1989, he studied at Yechave Daat Beit Midrash -within the first group of students it has ever had- directed by Rabbi Ovadia Yosef, who afterwards granted him rabbinical ordination. Rabbi Sacca is considered one of Rabbi Ovadia Yosef's closest students.

=== Rabbinical career ===
From 1989 to 1997, he led the youth department at Yesod Hadat and taught at Beth David Yeshiva within the same community.

In 1996, he founded Menora Organization, with the aim of strengthening the Jewish identity and spreading religious values among the Argentinian Jewish youth.

Since 1997, Rabbi Sacca has been the Sephardi Chief Rabbi in Buenos Aires.

In 2019, he started and promoted a joint university program with the University of Palermo (Buenos Aires), catered for Orthodox Jews, unique in Latin America, Menora-UP. Since then, more than 140 Jewish students studied on this program, on at least four different careers.

=== Interfaith work ===
He often meets and discusses different topics with multiple religious and political leaders. Among them is Pope Francis, with whom he has met many times since the period the Pope was the Archbishop of Buenos Aires.

== Published works ==
Books compiled by Rabbi Isaac Sacca

Otzarot Chachme Aram Tzova Al HaRambam: it contains interpretations and commentaries on the Rambam's Mishneh Torah- Sefer haMada- written by the greatest sages from Aleppo in all generations. (Published by Machon Aram Tzova-Yerushalaim, 1989)

Michtabe Halacha Yitzhak Yeranen: it includes halachic writings and answers by Rabbi Yitzhak Chehebar, Chief Rabbi of the Jews from Aleppo in Buenos Aires. (Published by the Sephardi Community in Argentina, Yesod Hadat- 1992)

Books written by Rabbi Isaac Sacca

Casher: Comida sana para el cuerpo y el espíritu (Published by Editorial Séfer, Buenos Aires, Argentina, 2024).

Enamorados: Una guía práctica y real para construir, disfrutar y mantener vivo el amor (Published by Editorial Lea, Buenos Aires, Argentina, 2025).

Books translated by Rabbi Isaac Sacca

Chazon Ovadia: Pesach's Laws and Haggadah, written by Rabbi Ovadia Yosef. (Published by Midrash Sepharadi-1989)

Torat Hamoadim: Halachic resolutions on the Jewish festivities written by Rabbi David Yosef. (Published by Yechave Daat Beit Midrash-1990)
