= Harold Shapiro =

Harold Shapiro is the name of:

- Harold S. Shapiro (1928–2021), mathematician
- Harold T. Shapiro (born 1935), economist and former president of Princeton University and of the University of Michigan

== See also ==
- Harold Shapero (1920–2013), American composer
- Harry Shapiro (disambiguation)
