= Congregation Shaare Zion =

Orthodox synagogue in Brooklyn, New York

- Hebrew: קהל קדוש שערי ציון
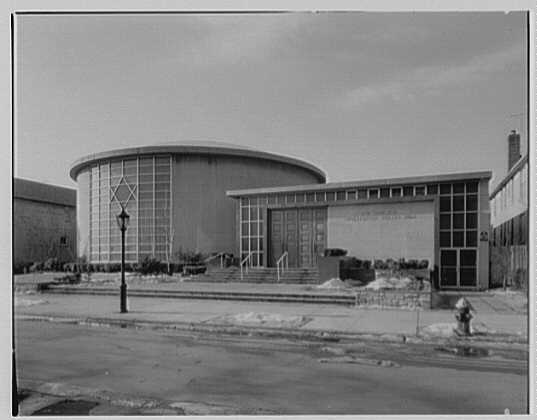
- The synagogue in 1964.

Religion
- Affiliation: Orthodox Judaism
- Rite: Sephardi
- Ecclesiastical or organisational status: Synagogue
- Leadership: Rabbi Meyer Yedid
- Status: Active

Location
- Location: 2030 Ocean Parkway, Brooklyn, New York City, New York
- Country: United States
- Interactive map of Congregation Shaare Zion
- Coordinates: 40°35′58″N 73°57′58″W

Architecture
- Architect: Morris Lapidus
- Type: Synagogue
- Style: Modern
- Established: 1941 (as a congregation)
- Groundbreaking: 1957
- Completed: 1960

Specifications
- Direction of façade: East
- Capacity: c. 1000 worshippers
- Materials: Concrete, steel, marble, glass

Website
- shaarezionny.com cszny.org

Congregation Shaare Zion (Hebrew: קהל קדוש שערי ציון) is an Orthodox Jewish Sephardic synagogue located at 2030 Ocean Parkway in Brooklyn, New York City, New York, United States.

Shaare Zion has an estimated 1,500 worshipers who attend its services Fridays and Saturdays for Shabbat making it one of the largest Sephardic synagogues in North America. In its over fifty years of existence, the synagogue has hosted over ten thousand occasions including Brit milahs, Bar mitzvas, engagements and weddings. The synagogue generally serves the Aleppo or (Halabi) descendants of the Syrian Jewish community.

== History ==
=== Origins ===
The congregation was started in 1941 as a local minyan (congregation), led by several prominent Syrian Jewish families in home at 1756 Ocean Parkway in Brooklyn, New York. Attendance was usually around 75 people, but the High Holidays, this increased to 750, and services were held at a nearby hall called Aperion Manor at 815 Kings Highway. In 1951 land was purchased on Ocean Parkway and between Avenues T and U. In 1953, architectural plans were drawn up for a synagogue building.

=== Construction ===
Soon after construction began, the building fund of $250,000 was used up, and several lawsuits followed over this issue. By 1957, additional funds had been raised or pledged, and the house sold for $90,000, allowing construction to resume. In September 1958, High Holy Day prayers were held in the unfinished social hall; construction was not completed until 1960. Designed by architect Morris Lapidus and completed in 1960, the structure includes a main sanctuary that can seat over 400 worshipers.

=== Design ===
The main sanctuary included a curved balcony, and central dome made of concrete reinforced with steel rods. The New York City Building Department insisted that the balcony be supported by 20 columns. Feeling this would ruin the aesthetic appeal of the sanctuary, the congregation refused, based on assurances from the building engineers that the balcony's cantilevered design was more than sufficient to support its fully loaded weight. A hall was also built behind the sanctuary for social events, and to provide space for additional services during busy periods. The main sanctuary of Shaare Zion opened for 2,100 congregants on the High Holy Days in 1960. The dome, banquet room, terrace room in the basement, and midrash upstairs were all utilized.

Since its construction the building has required very little exterior maintenance; the dome was repainted in 1993, and two glass panes have been replaced.

=== Expansion ===
In January 1990, the congregation bought the house next door, on the north side of the building. Renovations were completed a year later, in 1991. Known as the Annex Building, it is used for daily prayers and Torah study. The building also contains office space. In 1996, extensive renovations were done to Social Hall area of the building. The hall was demolished, and a new more modern banquet hall was built in its place. Additionally, a new synagogue building known as B'nei Shaare Zion capable of seating upwards of 250 worshipers, a Beth midrash with dual use as a prayer space on an upper level, and a secondary synagogue along with several meeting rooms on a lower level were built as well. During the 2000s, restoration work was carried out on the dome of the main sanctuary after forty years of continuous exposure to the elements.

=== Secondary proposed expansion ===
On December 20, 2011, a plan to expand the facilities of the synagogue was voted down by Brooklyn's Community Board 15, as congregants and nearby residents strongly opposed the development. Representatives of the congregation's board came requesting approval for a bulk variance to allow the enlargement; which would have seen a new six-story, 62-foot (19 m)-tall tower in place of the Annex Building. Within the tower were plans to include classrooms, study rooms, multi-purpose rooms and prayer rooms. Opponents of the construction plan took turns voicing their opinions complaining about noise, garbage and parking, which they said would worsen with the enlargement. Immediate neighbors also feared that a taller structure would limit the amount of sunlight hitting their property. The Board of Standards and Appeals will provide a final decision on the variance following an appeal by committee members.

== Internal politics ==
Born in Jerusalem in 1900, Jacob S. Kassin, was brought in to lead the congregation as the new Chief Rabbi of the community in 1932. Kassin was instrumental in establishing several binding edicts during his tenure, such as the 1935 "Conversion to Judaism proclamation". His son-in-law, Baruch Ben Haim (1921–2005), also served a leadership role for the synagogue and the community. Ben Haim is credited with a number of contributions to the synagogue, including the founding of the Shaare Zion Torah Center, where many congregants spend their time learning Torah. The Torah Center was established to educate the community in subjects of Jewish law and Torah. Morning and evening study classes are given by influential rabbis on a daily basis.

Between the 1940s and the 1950s, the rabbi of the congregation was Kurt Klappholz; an Ashkenazi rabbi born in Berlin to Polish parents, who was also principal of the Magen David Yeshivah, the congregation's day school. Jacob Kassin's son, Rabbi Saul J. Kassin originally served as a consulting rabbi along with Rabbi Abraham Hecht, who took over when Rabbi Klappholz left for another position. Hecht had served the Sephardic community for over fifty years: directing the large minyan of the main sanctuary, offering classes in Jewish Law, as well as scheduling and attending social receptions such as Bar Mitzvahs and Brit Milahs, along with officiating countless wedding ceremonies. However, due to controversial views regarding the Arab–Israeli conflict, Hecht was forced to exit his position under political pressure.

Another notable rabbinic figure to serve the congregation was Rabbi Dr. Raymond Harari. Harari directed the B'nei Shaare Zion minyan in the former banquet hall for a period of 18 years; from 1980 to 1998. Harari subsequently resigned his position for a different opportunity to lead the smaller Kol Israel congregation in Midwood, Brooklyn. He later led rabbinical duties at the Mikdash Eliyahu synagogue in the Gravesend neighborhood. Harari is also currently the Rosh Yeshivah of the Yeshiva of Flatbush. Rabbi Yaakov Ben Haim and Rabbi David Maslaton both jointly lead the new B'nei Shaare Zion synagogue in his place.

== Controversies ==
On 23 July 2009, Rabbi Kassin, 87, and Rabbi Eliahu Ben Haim, 58, brother of Rabbi Yaakov Ben Haim; along with 42 other officials and religious leaders were arrested by the Federal Bureau of Investigation as part of a major corruption and international money laundering conspiracy probe called Operation Bid Rig. Acting U.S. attorney Ralph J. Marra Jr. described the arrest during a news conference saying, clergy members "cloaked their extensive criminal activity behind a facade of rectitude." In March 2011, Rabbi Kassin pled guilty to unauthorized money transmitting for illegally funneling money to Israel through a charity he controlled. He was sentenced to two years of unsupervised probation.

On 26 April 2025, Israel's Minister of National Security, Itamar Ben-Gvir, an ultranationalist settler leader, who openly called for the ethnic cleansing of Gaza during the Gaza War, was scheduled to give a speech at Chabad Lubavitch World Headquarters as well as the Congregation Shaare Zion. Ben-Gvir's scheduled appearance drew protests and generated violence, following public backlash the event was canceled.

== Leadership ==
- Yaakov Ben Haim, Rabbi
- David Maslaton, Rabbi
- Meyer Yedid, Rabbi
- Raymond Haber, Rabbi
- Moshe Lagnado, Rabbi
- Moshe Arking, Rabbi
- Raymond, Beyda, Rabbi
- Dr. Victor H. Sasson, President
- Edward Farhi, Cantor
- David Shiro, Cantor
- Haim Eliyahu, Cantor
- Solomon Dayan, Cantor
- Youssef Saadeh, Cantor, Rabbi

== See also ==
- Syrian Jewish communities of the United States
