= Ozar Hatorah =

Orthodox Jewish educational organisation

Ozar Hatorah (Hebrew: אוצר התורה, lit. 'treasure of Torah') is an organization created in 1945 to provide Orthodox Jewish education. It began by setting up schools in Mandate Palestine, and after the foundation of the modern Israeli state, it went on to develop religious Jewish education in Muslim countries in the Middle East and North Africa.

In 1961, it expanded further by opening a school in France, where Sephardi communities were growing rapidly thanks to the emigration of Jews from North Africa that followed upon several former French colonies achieving independence. Its French network now serves communities in Paris, Toulouse, Marseille and elsewhere. Its schools teach secular subjects alongside its religious curriculum. It is now extending its activities into a wider cultural sphere by evolving its schools into multi-purpose Jewish community centres. It is financed by the American Jewish Joint Distribution Committee, local communities and private individuals.

== History ==
In 1945, Syrian-born Isaac Shalom of New York City, together with Joseph Shamah of Jerusalem and Ezra Teubal of Buenos Aires, worked together to develop a way to offset what they saw as Jewish spiritual decline and intellectual impoverishment in Mandate Palestine and the Mideast. They founded Ozar Hatorah as a non-profit organization in Jerusalem under the chairmanship of Joseph Shamah.

The organization began its work with an investigation of Jewish communities in Palestine and several neighboring Arab countries. It wanted to provide not only good teaching, but food and medical care to the students, whose immigrant families were often poor and struggling.

=== Mandate Palestine and Mideast ===
Ozar Hatorah first operated in what was then Mandate Palestine, opening 29 schools. After the establishment of the State of Israel in 1947, Ozar Hatorah ceased its operations in Israel. It began developing schools in Jewish communities in nations throughout the Middle East and North Africa. It established 40 schools in Iran, in which 8,600 students were enrolled, and also provided Jewish education in primary schools of the Alliance Israélite Universelle. In Syria, Ozar Hatorah was active in Aleppo and Damascus, where its school originally had 350 students. The schools are funded by the American Jewish Joint Distribution Committee. In 1971, the Damascus school was recognized by the Syrian government education department as the school with the highest grades in the country.

=== North African colonies and nations ===
Ozar Hatorah established schools in Tripoli, Libya before the Jewish population largely emigrated to Israel in 1950. It still operates schools in Morocco, with a total enrollment of over 500 students. At its peak, the organization was operating an educational network serving some 17,000 students, ranging from first-grade children to learned students preparing to enter the rabbinate.

By 1970, the organization was running 23 schools and a summer camp in Morocco, 41 schools and a summer camp in Iran, and two elementary schools in Syria. Together with students of its first elementary school in France, in Lyon (see below), it had a total enrollment of 13,610 students.

=== France ===
After the massive emigration of Jews from North African nations to France in the late 20th century when the former colonies gained independence, Ozar Hatorah extended its network to France. It opened its first school in 1961 in Lyon, where many Sephardi Jews had settled.

In 1971, Ozar Hatorah opened two schools in Créteil and Sarcelles, suburbs of Paris. By 2012 these had some 1,000 students. Subsequently, it set up schools in Antony, Toulouse, Marseille, Strasbourg, Aix-les-bains, and other cities, bringing the total number of Ozar Hatorah schools in France to 20, some maintained with local funds. In the 21st century, Marseille has the second-largest Jewish population (70,000) after Paris.

Ozar Hatorah plans to develop the schools further as centers for Jewish community life, by building facilities such as a mikveh (ritual bath) and synagogue, and providing adult classes, day camps, and other community activities. In 2012, the 20 schools in France were headed by Rabbi Jean-Paul Amoyelle, who has worked with the organization since 1967. According to CRIF, more than 30,000 students are enrolled in Ozar Hatorah schools in France. After a rise in antisemitic incidents in France in the 21st century, the schools assigned guards to each school to improve security.

== Incidents ==
On 31 December 2001, Molotov cocktails were thrown at the Ozar Hatorah school in the Paris suburb of Créteil, resulting in a classroom burning down. The incident was assumed to be an antisemitic attack and was condemned, but police later identified an unhappy student as responsible for the attack.

On 19 March 2012, four people were killed by a shooter at an Ozar Hatorah school in Toulouse, including a teaching rabbi and three children, two of them his sons. A teenager was also wounded in the attack. Police later identified Mohammed Merah, a French native of Algerian descent, as the shooter responsible for these and the associated deaths of three French Muslim army personnel in two other incidents on March 11 and March 15, and three police killed during the March 22 siege of his apartment. He also wounded a total of five people, four seriously. Police shot and killed Merah during the siege.
