= Harry Shapiro (criminal) =

Harry Shapiro is a convicted criminal who pleaded guilty on March 20, 1997, to federal charges that he had planted a pipe bomb at a Jacksonville, Florida, synagogue. Shapiro was 31 years old at the time of his plea and admitted "using an explosive to threaten a foreign official, internationally protected person and official guest of the United States Government."

On February 13, 1997, about three hours before former Israeli Prime Minister Shimon Peres was supposed to speak in support of the Oslo Accords at the Jacksonville Jewish Center, Shapiro called the Jacksonville Sheriff's office claiming to be a member of American Friends of the Islamic Jihad and warned of two bombs at the center. The building was evacuated and searched, but no bombs were found. Shapiro told his rabbi and a co-worker at the gas station where he worked of his plan to prevent Peres from speaking, but his claim was dismissed until a gunpowder laden pipe was found nine days later by children playing at the Center; it was then detonated by the police. Shapiro told the court March 19: "I placed gunpowder in a pipe. I placed it in a house of worship. I threatened a life of a human being with it. I called 911 and issued a threat to keep Mr. [Shimon] Peres from speaking." (Jewish Telegraphic Agency, March 28, 1997.) As part of his plea he avoided the charge of using an explosive in the commission of a crime, which carried up to 30 years in prison and a $250,000 fine.

As reported in the Washington Report on Middle East Affairs, (January/February 2001 issue, Pages 71–72, quoted above) Mr. Shapiro's crime was a hoax to protest and stop Shimon Peres' lecture. "...[H]e staged a phony bombing of a Jacksonville synagogue where Shimon Peres was to speak on behalf of the Oslo accords." Another source states that "Harry Shapiro... planted a phony pipe bomb at a Jewish community center in order to disrupt a speech by Prime Minister and peace advocate Shimon Peres." (Washington Monthly, September 2000.) This position was further supported by reports in the media at the time of the event, both at the bail hearing, where "Mr. Shapiro's lawyer, Hank Coxe, told the judge... that the bomb was 'incapable of exploding or causing harm to anyone,'" (New York Times, February 28, 1997), and at the sentencing, re-asserting Shapiro's attorney's claim that Shapiro did not intend to injure Peres or the audience of 1,500; "...that he had made an inoperable device. 'It was important for Mr. Shapiro to make clear that, in his mind, he never intended to hurt anybody,' defense attorney Hank Coxe told the Florida Times-Union after the hourlong hearing (Jewish Telegraphic Agency, March 28, 1997).

The fact that the device did not explode or might not have been functional was not a factor in the federal charge, [Assistant U.S. Attorney] Devereaux said (Jewish Telegraphic Agency, March 28, 1997).

Despite, "Federal and local authorities, as well as members of Israeli security units... having...searched the synagogue after receiving the threat," (New York Times, February 28, 1997), and Jacksoville area police having been told the location of the device in Shapiro's 911 call, all agencies failed to properly search the synagogue. There was a bitter public exchange between the State Department and the police in Jacksonville as to who was responsible for the failure to defuse the event from happening- the former accused the local police of utter incompetence, and the latter insisted they followed the State Department's orders as to how to conduct the search (New York Times, February 27, 1997, Late Edition - Final, Section A, Page 18), which eventually led to the Federal Bureau of Investigation taking the case out of the hands of local authorities.

Shapiro was released from federal custody on February 17, 2006.

== Analysis ==
Shapiro was profiled in a chapter entitled "Jacksonville, Florida, 1993-1997" in Jew vs. Jew: The Struggle for the Soul of American Jewry by Samuel G. Freedman, theorizing that the crime was committed as a result of Shapiro's theo-political leanings as a practicing Orthodox Jew. Based upon interviews with Shapiro, Freedman concluded that Shapiro identified with "Rabbi [Avraham] Hecht's theology," which according to Freedman,

"completed a circle for Harry. Years ago, Gush Emunim had taught that God granted Eretz Israel to the Jews; then Meir Kahane demonstrated how one could hate Jewish leaders in the name of loving the Jewish people; and now Harry understood the penalty for disobeying divine commandment, 'The Torah is our deed to the land,' Harry put it. 'Who is man to give it back?'...Never able to join the battle against Arabs in Eretz Israel, Harry decided to carry it against a Jew on American ground."
