= Zion Levy =

Sephardic Chief Rabbi of Panama

Rabbi Zion Rajamim Levy ציון רחמים לוי
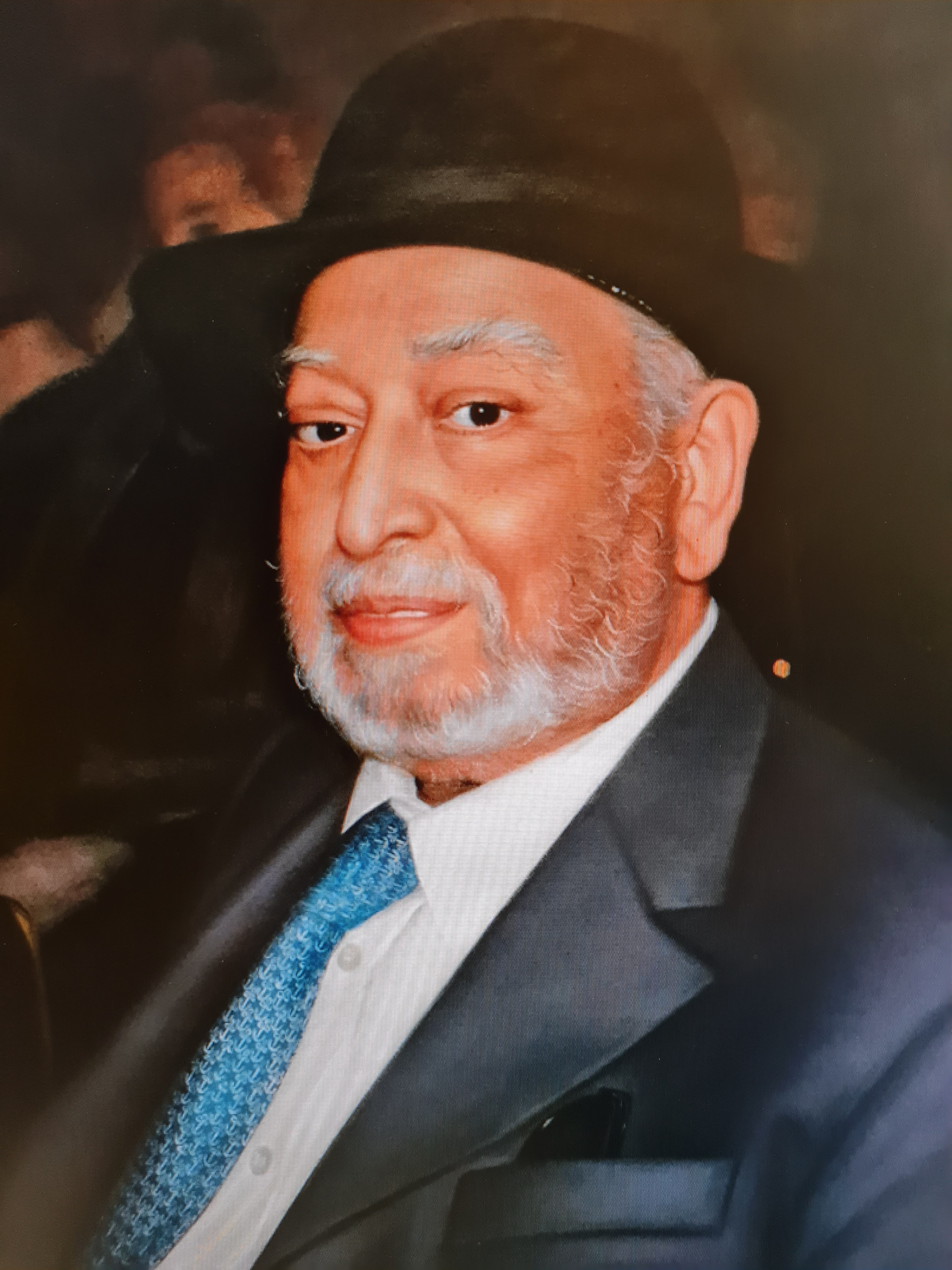
- Title: Sephardic Chief Rabbi of Panama

Personal life
- Born: Zion Levy; 8 September 1922 Jerusalem, British Mandate of Palestine
- Died: 23 November 2008 (aged 86) Tel Aviv, Israel
- Buried: Har HaMenuchot
- Spouse: Rubissa Sarah Levy
- Children: David Levy, Haim Levy, Yaacov Levy (deceased).

Religious life
- Religion: Judaism
- Denomination: Orthodox

Jewish leader
- Predecessor: Rabbi Simon Abadi
- Successor: Rabbi Haim Levy
- Synagogue: Shevet Ahim Congregation
- Yeshiva: Porat Yosef Yeshiva
- Began: 1951
- Ended: 2008

Zion (Sion) Rajamim Levy (Hebrew: ציון רחמים לוי, pronounced Ṣiyyon Raḥamim Levi) (1925–2008) was the Sephardic Chief Rabbi of Panama for 57 years. His tenure is thought to be the longest of any religious leader in the region. He built up a Jewish community of 6,000-7,000 Torah-observant Jews in a country of 3 million.

== Biography ==
=== Early life ===
Levy was born in Jerusalem shortly after his parents immigrated to Israel from Morocco. His father was Rabbi Yaakov Levy, a noted kabbalist at Beit El Yeshiva. Levy studied at Porat Yosef Yeshiva.

=== Career ===
Levy arrived in Panama in 1951 at the urging of the Jerusalem beth din. In his later years, Levy oversaw the construction of new synagogues in Panama City and worked to smooth relations with the country’s Arab and Muslim communities. He frequently phoned the country’s imam for a talk.

=== Death ===
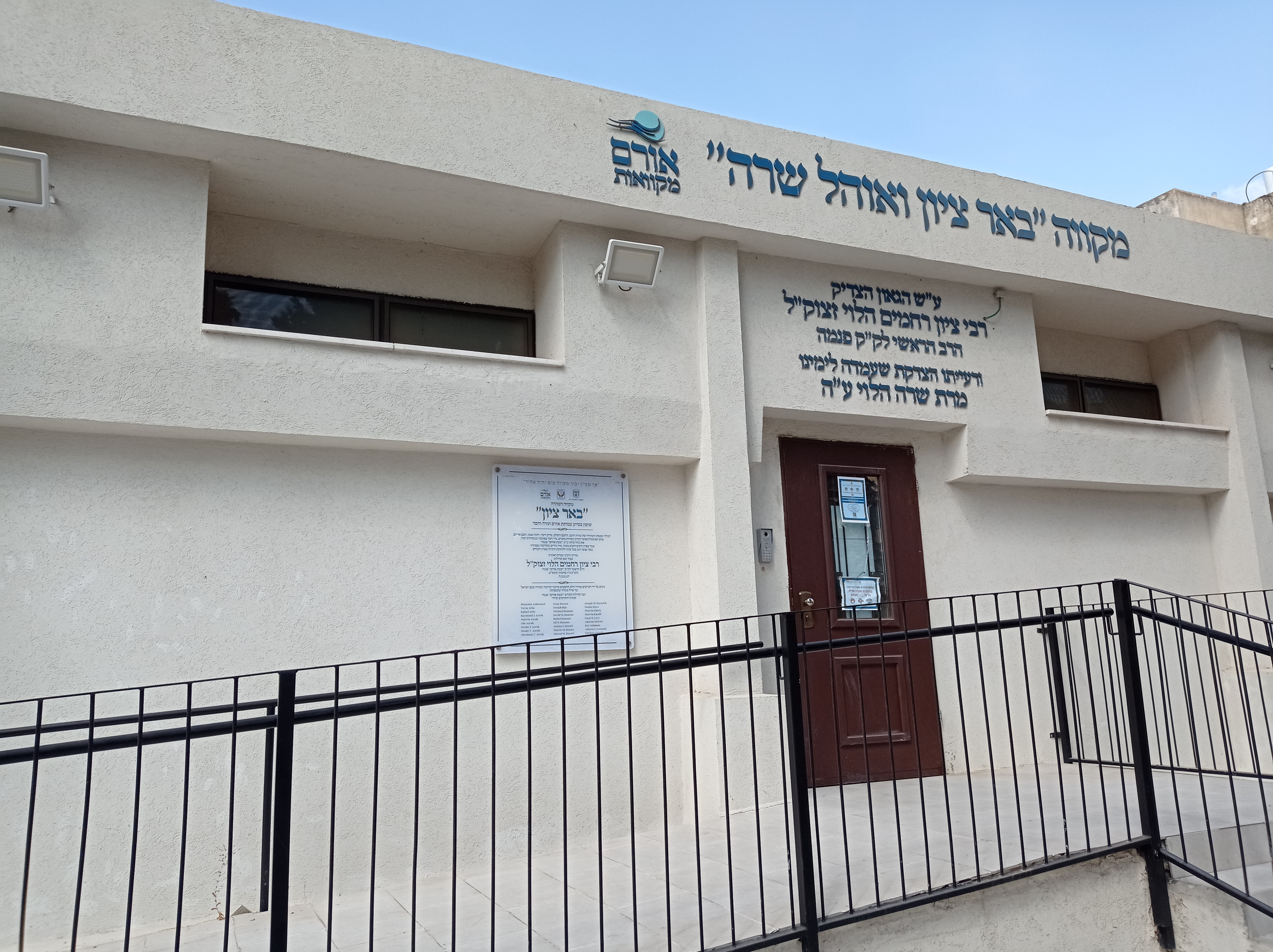
Mikveh in Lod, Israel, named after Zion Levy and his wife.

Levy suffered from ill health for several years. In October 2008, he felt unwell and was visited by two physicians from Israel's Tel Hashomer Hospital. The doctors found him in critical condition and recommended that he be flown to Israel to Tel Hashomer. His condition improved initially, but on the evening of 23 November 2008 he succumbed to his illness at the age of 83. He was eulogized at Porat Yosef Yeshiva.

Levy was survived by his sons, David and Haim Levy. His wife, Rubissa Sarah Levy, died shortly after Zion Levy's Death. Haim Levy, a resident of Jerusalem, took over his father's post in Panama as Chief Rabbi. He later resigned the post, and returned to Israel.
