= Isaac Shalom =

American businessman and philanthropist

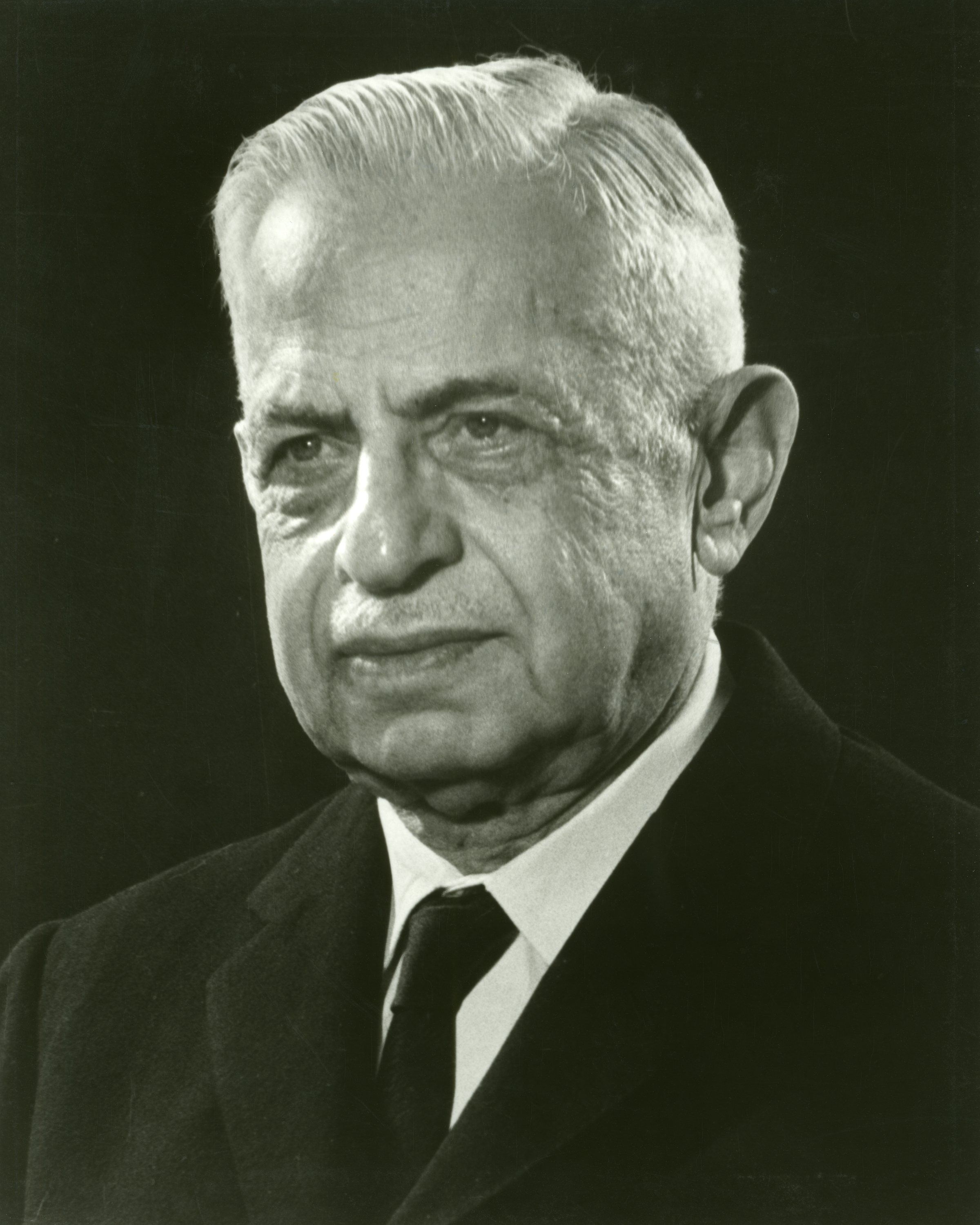
- Portrait of Isaac Shalom c. 1950
- Born: September 15, 1887; Aleppo, Syria
- Died: March 30, 1968 (aged 80); New York, United States
- Occupations: Businessman, philanthropist, community leader
- Spouse: Alice Shalom (née Chabbott-Levy) (m. 1917)

Isaac J. Shalom (September 15, 1887 – July 24, 1968) was an American businessman, philanthropist, and one of the leaders of the Sephardic and Syrian Jewish communities in New York. He played a pivotal role in revitalizing Jewish education globally in the mid-20th century.

== Early Life and Business Career ==
Isaac Shalom was born in Aleppo, Syria, on September 15, 1887. In 1907, he emigrated to the United States practically penniless and settled on New York's Lower East Side. He began as a textile peddler and, in 1921, founded I. Shalom & Co., which grew into one of the leading handkerchief manufacturers in the United States.

== Community Leadership in New York ==
As the Syrian Jewish community in Brooklyn grew through early 20th-century immigration, Shalom played a central role in its development. He provided financial support, employment, and guidance to help families establish themselves. When providing loans to community members—sometimes to start businesses that competed with his own—he encouraged them to share their success by supporting charitable causes, fostering a culture of Tzedakah (charitable giving) that shaped the community as it prospered.

In 1946, Shalom founded Magen David Yeshivah to offer dual Jewish and secular education at a time when most Sephardic children attended public schools. The school helped preserve the community's heritage and values while preparing students for broader society.

In the early 1970s, a committee was formed to expand the building to meet rising demand, and the elementary school was renamed the “Isaac Shalom Elementary School” in his honor. Magen David Yeshivah serves approximately 2,000 students from preschool through high school today.

== Philanthropy: Humanitarian and Educational Initiatives ==
=== Early Relief Work and Rescue Involvement ===
Isaac Shalom was involved with Vaad Hatzala, a rescue organization founded in 1939 by American Orthodox rabbis to help save European Jews from Nazi persecution during the Holocaust.

=== "Committee for the Forgotten Million" ===
During his travels to Jewish communities in North Africa and the Middle East, Shalom observed widespread poverty, illiteracy, and a lack of infrastructure necessary to sustain Jewish communal life. Although these communities were spared the extermination experienced by European Jewry during the Holocaust, in which one-third of the Jewish population was murdered, they faced antisemitic legislation, economic hardship, and postwar instability. In response, Shalom created what he called the "Committee for the Forgotten Million"—referring to nearly one million Jews in Jewish communities across the Middle East and North Africa whose needs were largely overlooked in the postwar Jewish world. Rooted in centuries of religious and cultural life, these communities faced the risk of decline, dislocation, and assimilation. Shalom believed that education was essential to preserving their identity and future.

=== Founding of Ozar Hatorah ===
To realize this vision, Shalom co-founded Ozar Hatorah in 1945, an organization devoted to sustaining Orthodox Jewish life through both religious and secular education. With support from the JDC, he helped establish a network of schools across Morocco, Algeria, Tunisia, Libya, Egypt, Syria, Lebanon, Iran, and briefly Iraq. These schools operated in cities such as Tangiers, Casablanca, Tunis, Cairo, Damascus, Beirut, and Tehran, and at their peak served more than 20,000 students.

In 1971, the Ozar Hatorah school in Damascus was singled out by the governmental education department for achieving the highest academic marks in Syria.

=== Expansion to France and Continued Growth ===
In the decades following World War II, rising antisemitism and political upheaval forced hundreds of thousands of Jews to flee North Africa and the Middle East. Over 300,000 resettled in France, including large numbers from Algeria, Tunisia, and Morocco. The French Jewish community, still reeling from the Holocaust—which claimed the lives of nearly 80,000 French Jews—lacked the infrastructure to absorb this influx.

Ozar Hatorah redirected its efforts to France, opening its first school in Lyon in 1961, followed by a network of institutions under the leadership of Rabbi Jean-Paul Amoyelle. By the early 2000s, it operated more than twenty schools nationwide, serving over 5,000 students. Ozar Hatorah schools in France have earned a reputation for academic excellence. The organization remains active in France today, where it is credited with helping preserve Jewish identity in the face of significant social and cultural pressures. The organization also continues to operate a few schools in Morocco, where Jewish communities—though greatly diminished—still exist.

== Personal Life and Legacy ==
Shalom lived in Brooklyn, New York. He died on July 24, 1968, and is buried on the Mount of Olives in East Jerusalem. He married Alice Shalom (née Chabot), who served as Vice President of the U.J.A. Women. The couple had three sons and two daughters.

In addition to his educational initiatives, Shalom actively supported Israel's economic development. He helped establish business ventures there, including Amcor Ltd., an early manufacturer of refrigerators and electrical appliances.

== See also ==
- Syrian Jews
- Ozar Hatorah
