= Abraham Hecht =

American Orthodox rabbi

Rabbi Abraham B. Hecht

Personal life
- Born: April 5, 1922 Brooklyn, New York
- Died: January 5, 2013 (aged 90) Brooklyn, New York
- Spouse: Liba
- Children: Mrs. Nechama Kantor, Mrs. Esther Kaplan, Rabbi Eli Hecht, Rabbi Yossi Hecht, Mrs. Rochel Weinberg, Mrs. Shani Fasten, Rabbi Shea Hecht, Rabbi Ari Hecht, Rabbi Yisroel Hecht

Religious life
- Religion: Judaism
- Denomination: Chabad

Jewish leader
- Position: Rabbi
- Synagogue: Congregation Shaare Zion
- Yahrtzeit: 24 Tevet

Abraham Hecht (Avraham Berl Hecht) (April 5, 1922 – January 5, 2013) was a Chabad-affiliated American Orthodox rabbi, and president of the Rabbinical Alliance of America – Igud HaRabanim. Known as a "rabbi's rabbi" and a scholar of Torah, Hecht was regarded by some as one of America's most articulate Orthodox rabbinic leaders.

== Life and career ==
Abraham Hecht was a Hasid (disciple) of the Lubavitcher Rebbe, Menachem Mendel Schneerson, and of the previous Rebbe, Rabbi Yosef Yitzchok Schneersohn. He had the distinction of being one of the first ten students of Yeshiva Tomchei Tmimim in America. He also served as a Shaliach ("emissary") in Boston, Buffalo, Newark, and New Haven, establishing Yeshiva Achei T'mimim elementary schools for both boys and girls.

Hecht was the rabbi of Congregation Shaare Zion of Brooklyn, New York, the largest Sephardic congregation in North America, comprising more than 3,500 families. Hecht served the congregation for more than fifty years. Known as a distinguished orator, Hecht inspired many to study the teachings of the Torah and mitzvot. He was a frequent contributor for over fifty years to various Jewish publications in English, Hebrew, and Yiddish.

Hecht was an advocate for Mihu Yehudi—Giyur K'halacha Who is a Jew?, Shleimus HaTorah (Torah study) and Shleimus HaAretz—Pikuach Nefesh (see Land of Israel).

Hecht led protests against the film Monty Python's Life of Brian, claiming that it "was produced in hell."

Hecht promoted awareness on behalf of "Family Values" within the Jewish community, as well as in the larger population. He worked to raise awareness of the Seven Universal Laws of Noah (Sheva Mitzvoth Bnei Noach) in greater society.

== Controversy ==
Hecht was featured in a June 23, 1995, article by Larry Yudelson, for his assertion, at a rabbinical gathering, that Jewish Law (Halakha) could permit the assassination of Israeli Prime Minister Yitzhak Rabin and Foreign Minister Shimon Peres for their proposal at Oslo to withdraw from parts of the West Bank and the Gaza Strip. On June 19, 1995, Hecht told the gathered members of the International Rabbinical Coalition for Israel "that by handing over Israeli land and property, Israeli leaders are betraying Jews to non-Jews" and that, according to Maimonides, "such people should be killed before they can perform the deed." An October 1995 article in New York Magazine referred to Hecht as the rabbi who "sentenced" Yitzak Rabin to death, and quoted Hecht as praising Israeli mass murderer and American expatriate Baruch Goldstein, as "a great man, a holy man". At the time, Hecht was a senior rabbi of Congregation Shaare Zion in Brooklyn, the largest Sephardic Jewish congregation in the U.S.

Rabin was assassinated in Israel on November 4, 1995, by Yigal Amir for signing the Oslo Accords. After the assassination, Hecht was placed on a six-month paid leave by his synagogue and was, along with six other American Jews, barred for "security" reasons by the Israeli government from entering the country. He was subsequently let go from his position by the synagogue. The congregation issued a formal apology to Hecht in 2012.

== Death ==
On the night of January 5, 2013, Hecht died in Brooklyn, New York. He was 90 years old. Hecht was survived by nine children and their families. His funeral service was held the next day at the Shomrei Hadas chapel in Borough Park, Brooklyn.

== Works ==
- Spiritual Horizons
- Spiritual Freedom
- Autobiography
