= Porat Yosef Yeshiva =

Yeshiva in Jerusalem

Coordinates: 31°46′30.8″N 35°14′0.9″E

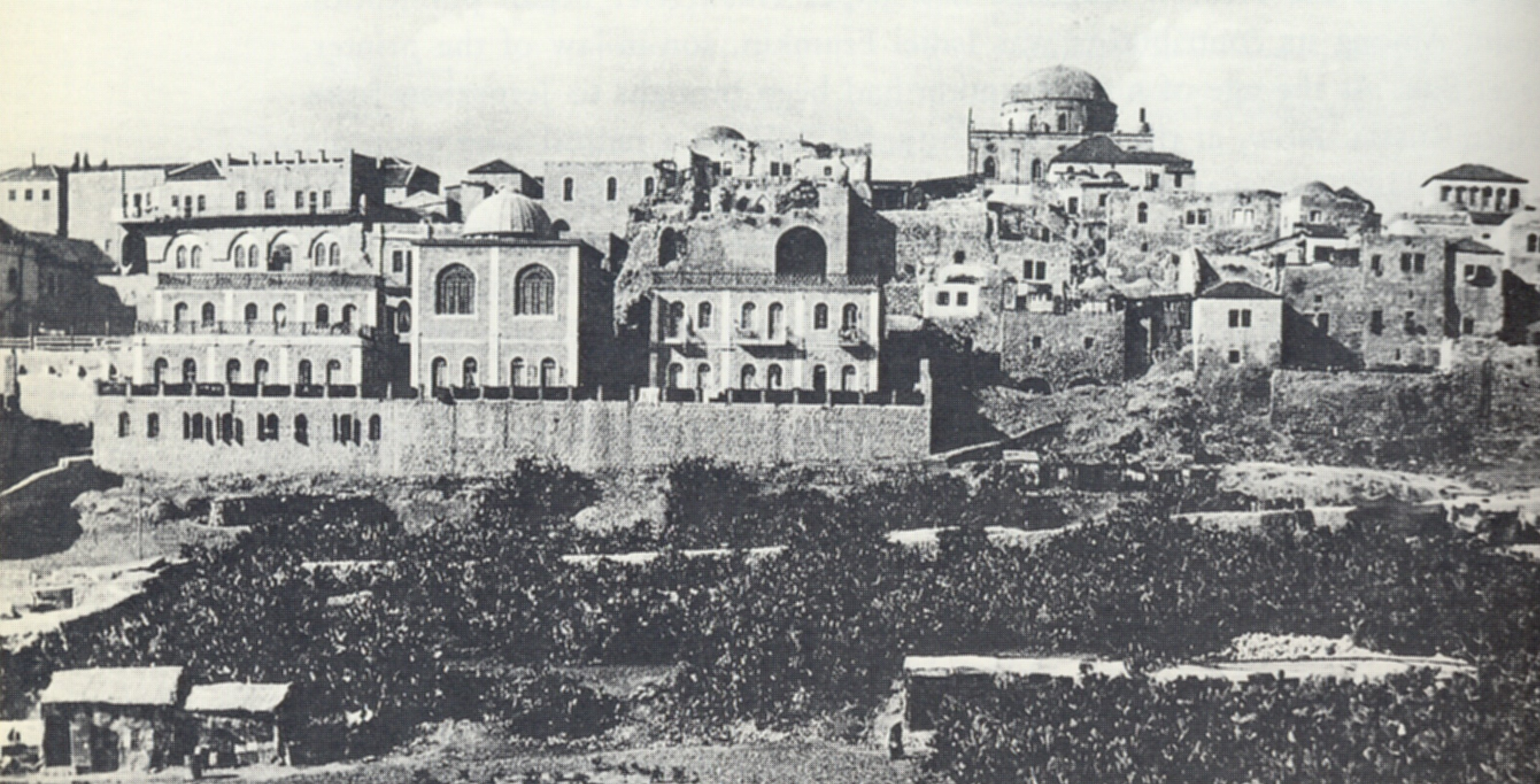
The pre-1948 facade of the Porat Yosef Yeshiva (left) facing the Temple Mount. The domed Tiferet Yisrael Synagogue is to the right, rear.

Porat Yosef Yeshiva (Hebrew: ישיבת פורת יוסף) is a Sephardic yeshiva in Jerusalem, with locations in both the Old City and the Geula neighborhood. The name Porat Yosef means "Joseph is a fruitful tree" after the biblical verse Genesis 49:22.

== History ==
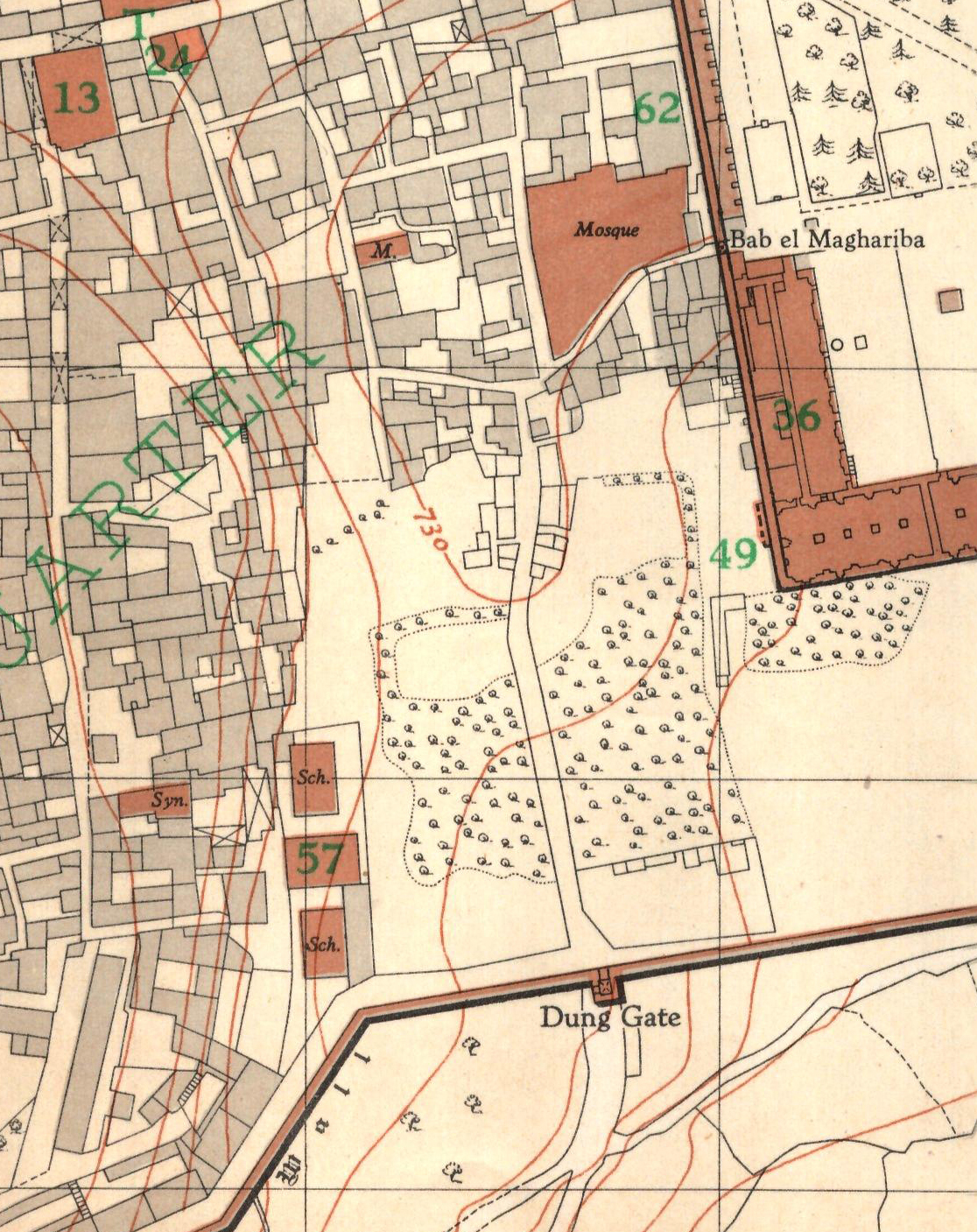
Porat Yosef Yeshiva (number 57 and adjacent schools) in the 1936-47 Survey of Palestine map

Yeshivat Ohel Moed, cofounded by Rabbis Ezra Harari-Raful and Refael Shelomo Laniado in Jerusalem in 1904, was the forerunner to Porat Yosef Yeshiva. Harari-Raful also opened another yeshiva in 1918 that merged with Porat Yosef in 1923.

The cornerstone for Porat Yosef Yeshiva was laid in Jerusalem's Old City in 1914. Yosef Shalom, a Baghdadi philanthropist from Calcutta, India, originally bought the site overlooking the Temple Mount with the intention of building a hospital. When he wrote to the Ben Ish Chai of Baghdad for his opinion, the sage persuaded him to endow a yeshiva instead.

Construction was delayed, however, due to World War I; the yeshiva was finally inaugurated in 1923. The sprawling campus consisted of a large beth midrash (study hall); two smaller study halls for a kollel for married students; and 50 other rooms including dormitories, offices and a library.

There is a well known story regarding one of the students of the yeshiva who was found one morning to have become deranged that night after transgressing the words of the Talmud that it is forbidden for one to sleep in a dark room alone (according to some, at night), or else the Evil Spirit will seize them. Rabbi Yehuda Tzadka underscored from this event that one must not take the words of the sages lightly

== Destruction and rebuilding ==
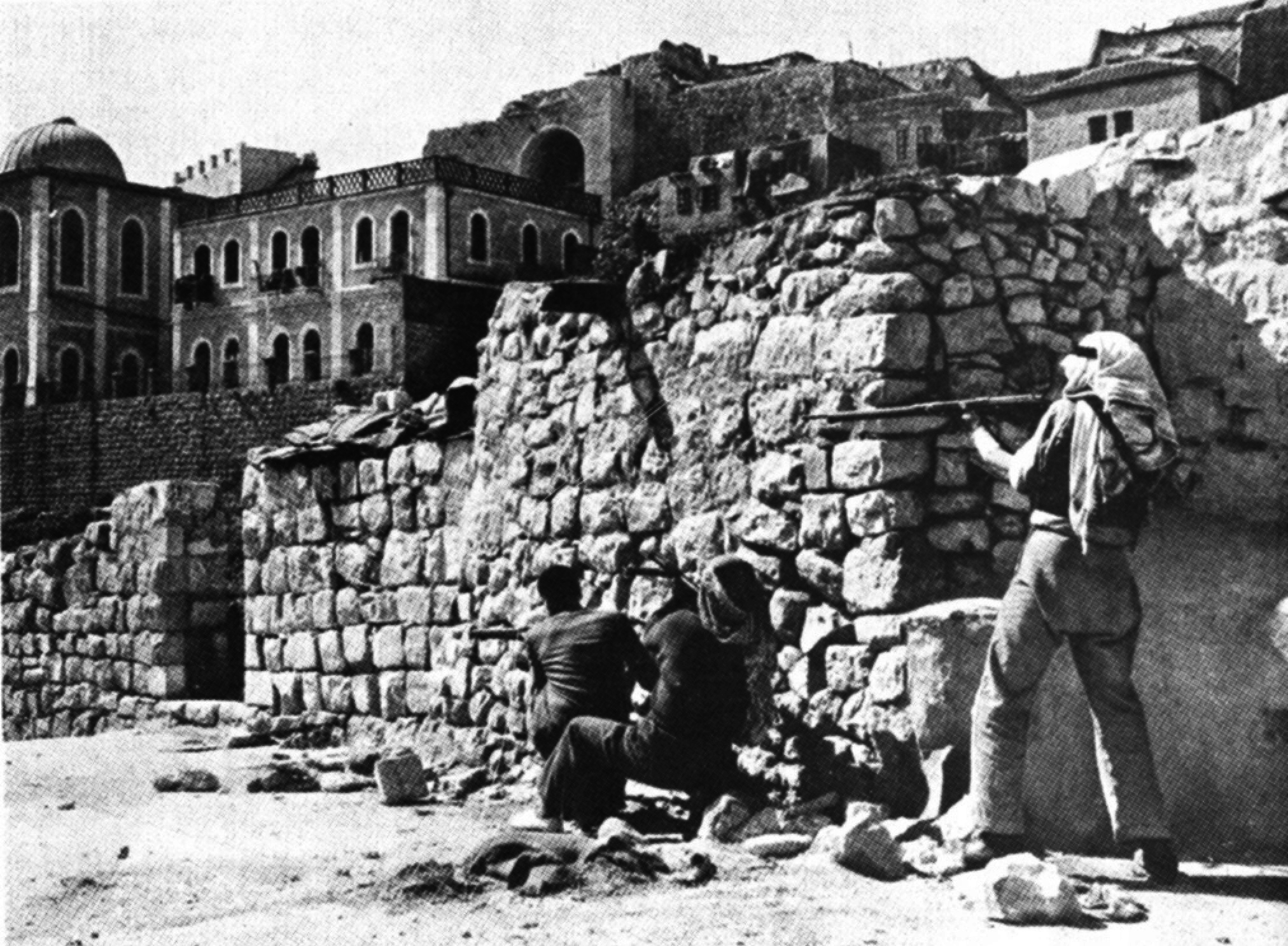
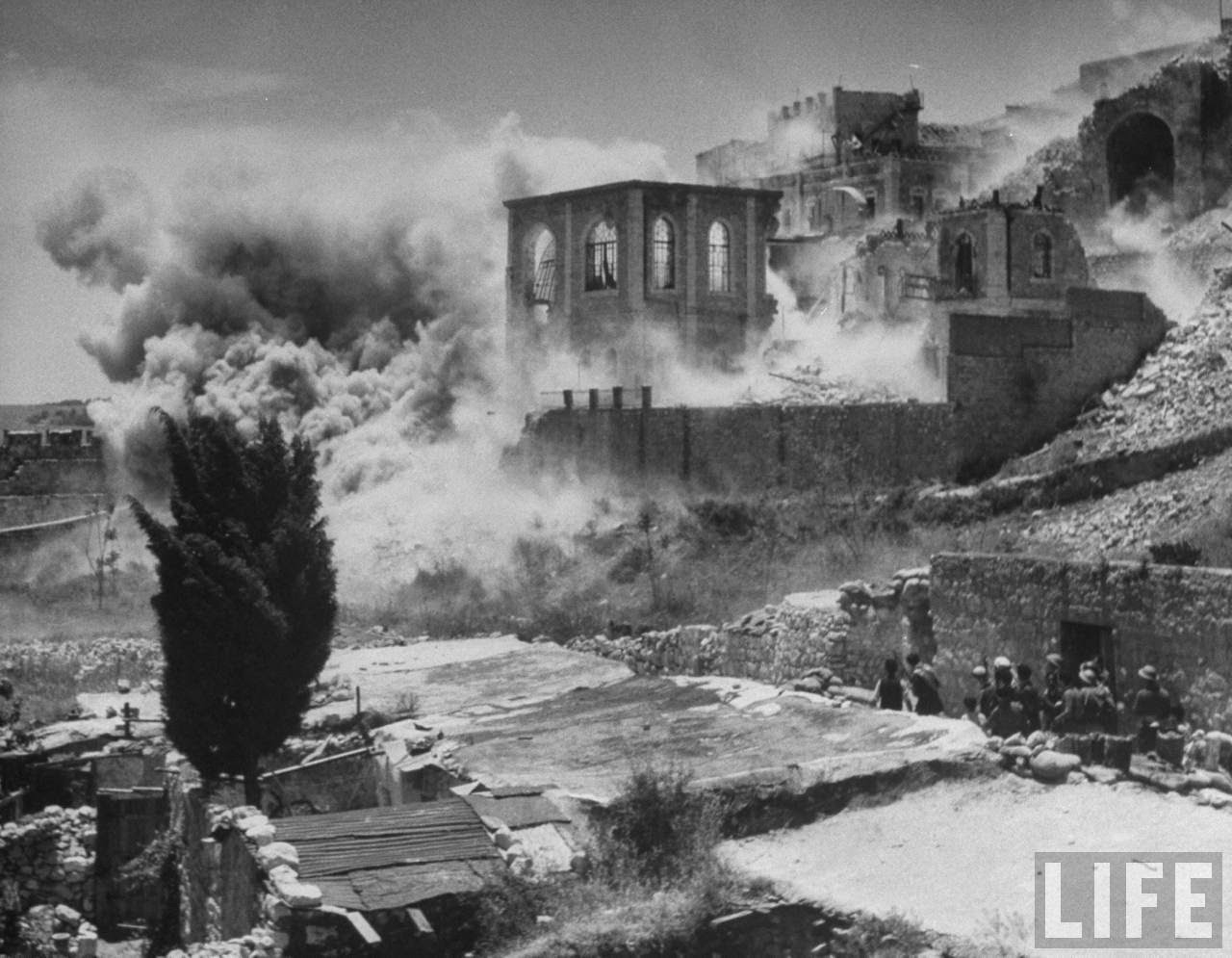
The Arab Legion attacking Porat Yosef Yeshiva (left) and then blasting it (right)

In May 1948, shortly after the start of the 1948 Arab–Israeli War, the yeshiva building was attacked and destroyed by the Arab Legion. After the war's conclusion in 1949, a new home was established for the yeshiva in the Geula neighborhood, at the corner of Malkhei Yisrael and Yosef Ben Mattityahu Streets.

Following the 1967 Six-Day War, Israeli architect Moshe Safdie designed a new campus on the yeshiva's original site in the Old City, though the Geula site was retained and now the two run in parallel. The new building, based on the original design, blends tradition with modern styling. In both texture and colour, the stone walls echo the dominant building material of Jerusalem. The synagogue itself is a substantial structure of six stories, seating 450 worshippers. The edifice is covered by a large, semitransparent dome which permits light to enter by day, while at night it glows with interior illumination.

== Curriculum ==
The yeshiva bases its curriculum on the study of Talmud, poskim (decisors of cases in Jewish law) and the commentaries on the Shulchan Aruch.

== Roshei yeshiva ==
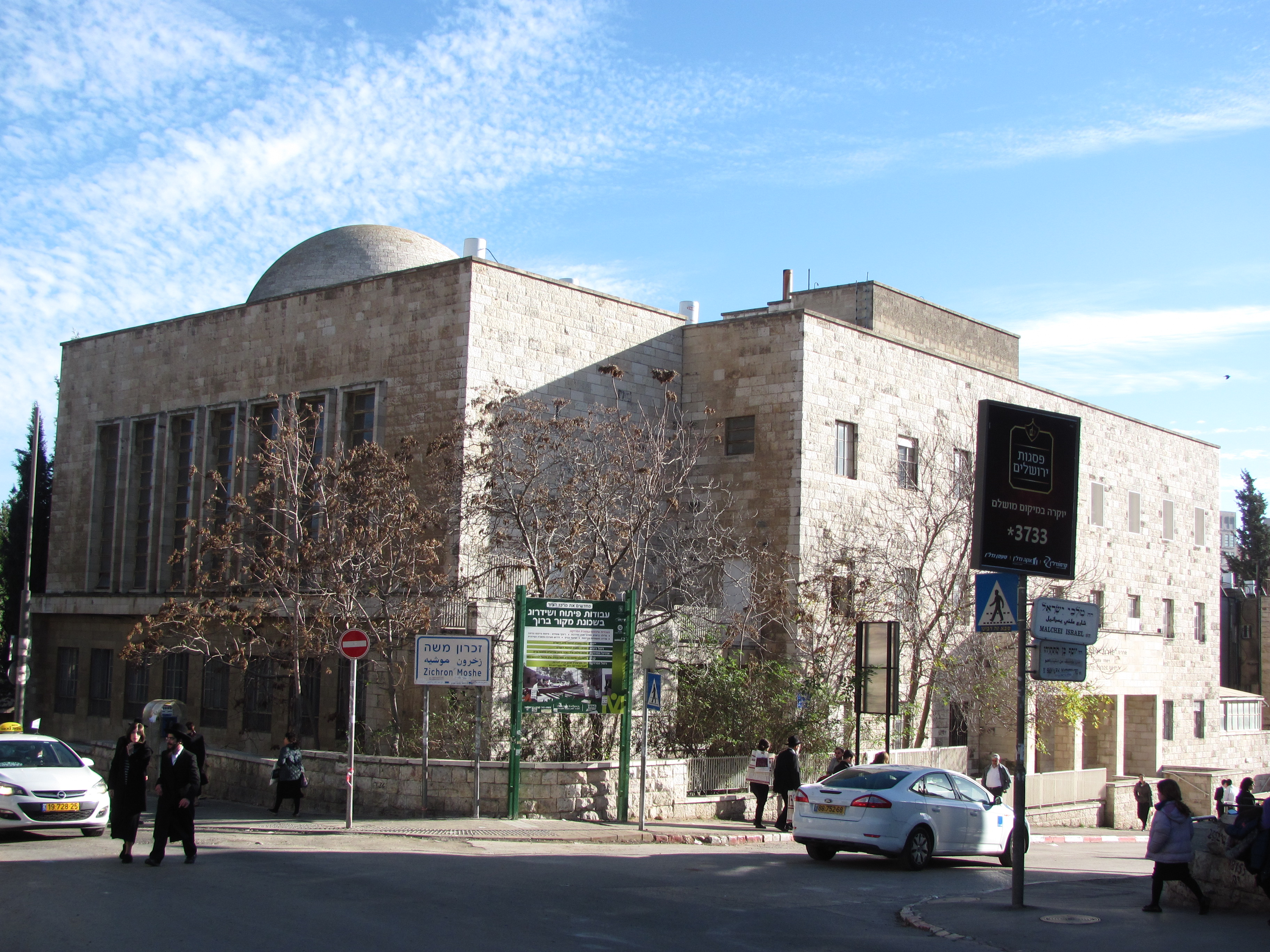
Geula branch of Porat Yosef Yeshiva.

The first rosh yeshiva of Porat Yosef in 1923 was Rabbi Refael Shelomo Laniado. Upon his death in 1925, Rabbi Ezra Attiya succeeded him as rosh yeshiva, a position he held until his death in 1970. The Old City branch of the yeshiva was subsequently led by Rabbi Ben-Zion Meir Hai Uziel, who was succeeded by Rabbi Shalom Cohen, until his death in 2022. Rabbi Yosef Chaim Kopschitz was a Rosh Yeshiva in the Old City branch until his death in 2023.

The Geula branch was headed by Rabbi Yehuda Tzadka from 1970 to 1983; he was followed by Rabbi Ben Zion Abba Shaul, who led the Geula branch until his death in 1998. Today the rosh yeshiva of the Geula branch is Rabbi Moshe Tzadka.

== Notable alumni ==
- Ben Zion Abba Shaul, rosh yeshiva, Porat Yosef Yeshiva
- Amram Aburbeh, Sephardi chief rabbi of Petah Tikva
- Baruch Ben Haim, leader of the Brooklyn Syrian Jewish community
- Eliyahu Ben Haim, Halakhist, Chief Rabbi/Posek of the worldwide Jewish Mashhadi-Persian Diaspora (who are mainly centered in Great Neck, New York), Rosh Yeshiva at RIETS (Yeshiva University) and director of its Sefaradi Semikha shiur, and also an Av Beth Din and Rosh Kollel in Queens, New York
- Aryeh Deri, leader of the Shas political party
- Mordechai Eliyahu, Sephardi Chief Rabbi of Israel
- Yitzchak Kaduri, Sephardi kabbalist
- Zion Levy, Sephardi Chief Rabbi of Panama
- Isaac Sacca, Sephardi Chief Rabbi of Buenos Aires
- Eli Yishai, former leader of Shas and leader of Ha'am Itanu
- Yehuda Tzadka, rosh yeshiva, Porat Yosef Yeshiva
- Ovadia Yosef, Sephardi Chief Rabbi of Israel
- Yitzhak Yosef, Sephardi Chief Rabbi of Israel
