= Ezra Attiya =

Rabbi Ezra Attiya עזרא עטייה
- Title: Rosh yeshiva

Personal life
- Born: 31 January 1885 Aleppo, Syria
- Died: 25 May 1970 (aged 85) Jerusalem
- Buried: Har HaMenuchot
- Parent(s): Yitzchak and Leah Attiya

Religious life
- Religion: Judaism

Jewish leader
- Predecessor: Shlomo Laniado
- Successor: Yehuda Tzadka
- Yeshiva: Porat Yosef Yeshiva
- Began: 1925
- Ended: 1970

Ezra Attiya (Hebrew: עזרא עטייה; Arabic: عزرا عطية; 31 January 1885 – 25 May 1970) was a Sephardic Jewish rabbi who was rosh yeshiva (dean) of Porat Yosef Yeshiva in Jerusalem for 45 years.

== Early life ==
Attiya was born on 31 January 1885 (Tu Bishvat 5645 on the Jewish calendar) in Aleppo, Syria, which was then part of the Ottoman Empire. His parents, Yitzchak and Leah, had lost several children in infancy, and before his birth they traveled to the gravesite of the Jewish prophet Ezra to pray that if the child they were expecting was a boy, they would name him Ezra and see that he dedicated himself to a life of Torah. He had one brother, Eliyahu. His father was an Aleppo melamed (teacher).

When Attiya was 16 years old his family immigrated to Jerusalem's Old City, to which a large number of rabbis from Aleppo had immigrated. Soon after his father died, leaving an impoverished widow and two orphans. While his mother hired herself out for domestic work in the homes of wealthy people, young Ezra decided to devote his life to Jewish study. He went to learn, pray, and sleep on a bench in a small beth midrash in the Bukharim neighborhood of the New City called Shoshanim LeDavid, covering vast amounts of the Talmud with commentaries and poskim (halakhic decisors). As money was scarce in his household, he sustained himself with a nightly meal of dry pita seasoned with salt. In his old age, he told his students, "When I was young, I studied Torah through hardship. If we were truly fortunate, my mother and I had a whole pita to share. On rare occasions we also had an egg, which we divided in half. But the hunger did not bother me in the least."

In 1909, Attiya married Bolissa Salem, daughter of Avraham Salem, a kabbalist. In 1911 their first son was born, but died in infancy.

At the beginning of World War I, there was a general mobilization for the Turkish army and all able-bodied men were snatched off the streets. Attiya's brother Eliyahu died of pneumonia in the Turkish army. Two of the leading Sephardic sages of Jerusalem, Chaim Shaul Dweck Hakohen and Avraham Ades, smuggled Attiya to Egypt using a forged Russian passport, which at that time did not require a photograph.

Attiya settled in Cairo. At first he attempted to go into business, but quickly lost most of his money. Then he met Nissim Nachum, a wealthy refugee who knew him from Jerusalem. With Nachum's backing, Attiya opened a yeshiva named Ahavah VeAchvah in the basement of the Cairo rabbinate. Under his direction, the yeshiva grew to 100 students, attracting many from secular backgrounds. Attiya also gave classes to working men, and was a dayan on the Cairo beit din. After World War I ended his wife joined him. They and their two children returned to Jerusalem in 1922.

== Rabbinic career ==
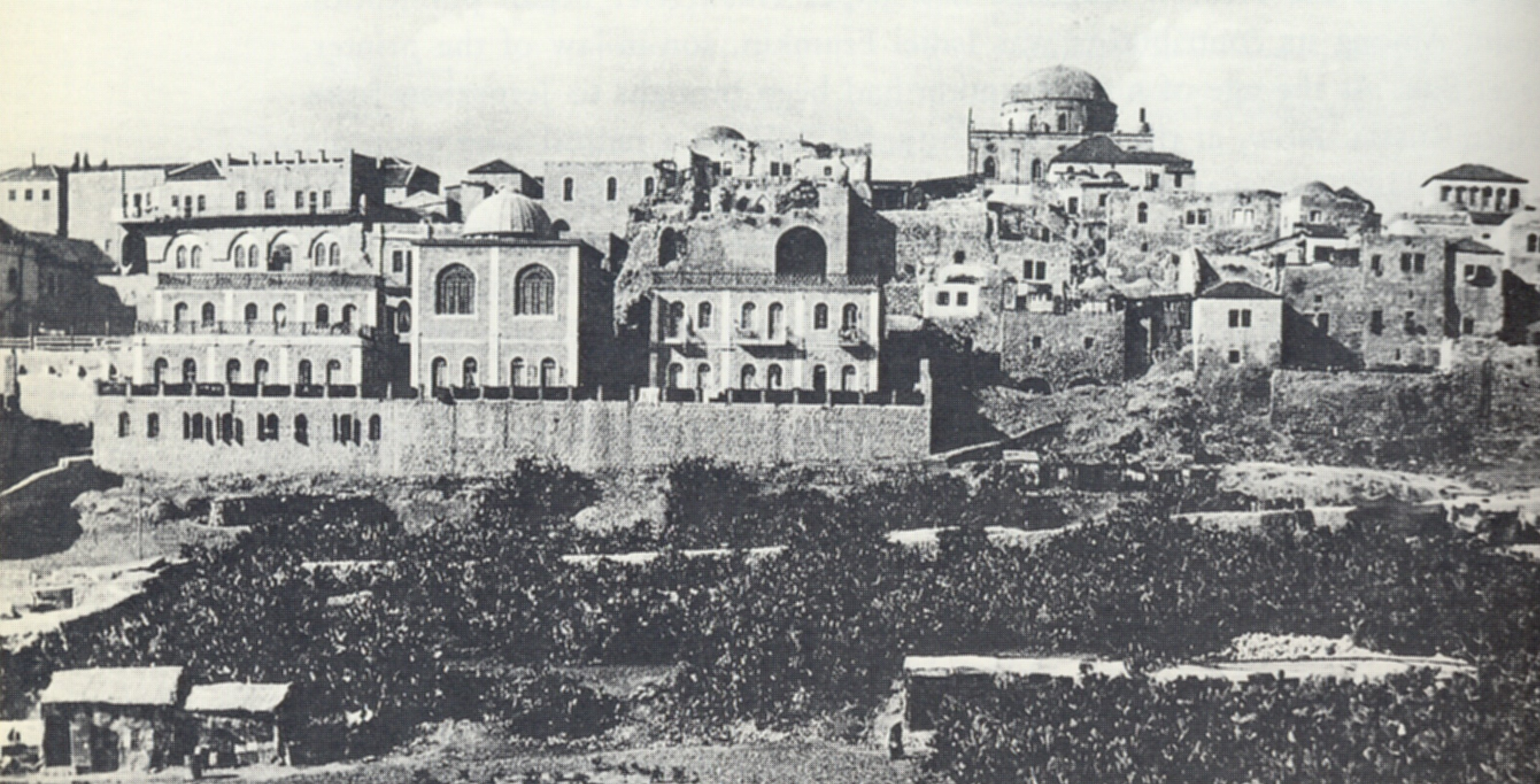
The pre-1948 facade of Porat Yosef Yeshiva in the Old City of Jerusalem.

In Jerusalem, Attiya returned to his teaching position at Ohel Mo'ed Yeshiva. He also studied privately with Chaim Shaul Dweck and Solomon Eliezer Alfandari. When Porat Yosef Yeshiva opened in 1923, Ohel Moed was merged with the new yeshiva and Attiya was appointed as the mashgiach ruchani. Following the sudden death of the rosh yeshiva, Shlomo Laniado, in 1925, Attiya was named his successor. He served as rosh yeshiva for 45 years.

Attiya's tenure as rosh yeshiva was marked by political upheaval. When the 1929 Arab riots cut off access to the yeshiva building in the Old City, Attiya moved classes to several synagogues in the New City and appointed advanced students to teach them, while he personally supervised every location. This situation continued for eight years. During the 1948 Arab-Israeli War, the yeshiva again evacuated to synagogues in the Katamon, Geula and Bucharim neighborhoods. This time, however, the main yeshiva building in the Old City was burned to the ground by Jordanian troops, and thousands of Attiya's unpublished writings were burned along with it. He refused to rewrite them, feeling that they were not meant for publication. Instead, his students would be his lifetime achievement.

In the mid-1950s, Porat Yosef Yeshiva and the Gerrer community jointly purchased a plot of land in the Geula neighborhood, where the yeshiva and the Ger beis medrash were built side by side. The original yeshiva campus in the Old City was rebuilt and reopened in the 1970s.

== Influence ==
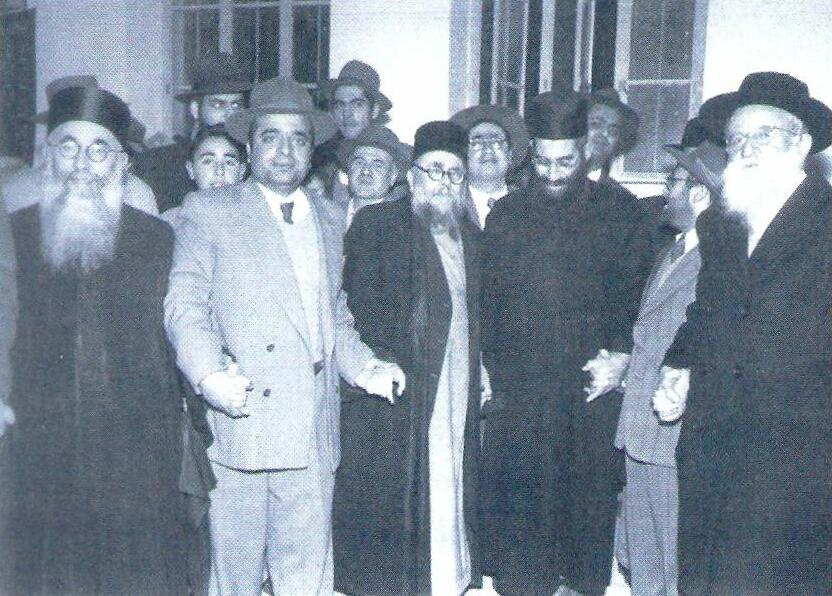
Rabbis of Porat Yosef Yeshiva in 1952. Left to right: Yaakov Ades, Ben Zion Abba Shaul, Attiya, Mansour ben Shimon.

Until that time, full-time Jewish education past the age of bar mitzvah was reserved for gifted students from Sephardic homes; most Sephardic boys went to work to help support their families. Attiya encouraged boys to continue learning into their teens..

Attiya was a dayan (rabbinical judge) on the Sephardic beit din of Jerusalem.

== Final years ==
LHe died in Jerusalem on the morning of 25 May 1970 (19 Iyar 5730) and was buried on Har HaMenuchot.

He was succeeded as rosh yeshiva by Yehuda Tzadka, who had studied under him.
