= Ben Zion Abba Shaul =

Sephardic rabbi, Torah scholar and halakhic arbiter

Rabbi Ben Zion Abba Shaul בן-ציון אבא-שאול

Personal life
- Born: 31 July 1924 Jerusalem
- Died: 13 July 1998 (aged 73) Jerusalem
- Buried: Sanhedria Cemetery
- Spouse: Hadassah Shaharbani
- Children: Eliyahu
- Parent(s): Eliyahu and Benaya Abba-Shaul
- Education: Porat Yosef Yeshiva

Religious life
- Religion: Judaism

Jewish leader
- Predecessor: Rabbi Yehuda Tzadka
- Yeshiva: Porat Yosef Yeshiva
- Position: Rosh Yeshiva
- Began: 1983
- Ended: 1998

Ben Zion Abba Shaul (Hebrew: בן-ציון אבא-שאול; 31 July 1924 – 13 July 1998; on the Hebrew calendar: 29 Tammuz 5684 – 19 Tammuz 5758) (first name also spelled Ben Sion) was one of the leading Sephardic rabbis, Torah scholars and halakhic arbiters of his day, and the rosh yeshiva of Porat Yosef Yeshiva in Jerusalem for the last 15 years of his life. He was responsible for a religious revival among Sephardic Jews with his founding of Ma'ayan HaChinuch HaTorani, a network of Torah schools for Sephardic children in Israel, and was widely known for his ability to give blessings that were fulfilled.

== Early life ==
Ben Zion Abba Shaul was born in Jerusalem to Eliyahu and Benaya Abba Shaul, immigrants from Iran. A shoemaker by trade, Eliyahu was also a Torah scholar and kabbalist; he was Ben Zion's first teacher. Eliyahu served as gabbai (caretaker and fundraiser) for the Ohel Rachel synagogue in the Bukharim Quarter of Jerusalem for 50 years. In his old age, his son Ben Zion became the rabbi of the synagogue and another son, Yaakov, became the hazzan.

Abba Shaul was the eldest boy in a family of sixteen children. Despite their poverty, his parents were committed to raising a family of Torah scholars, even as many other families from Oriental and Sephardi backgrounds were lured into sending their children to Zionist schools. The family kept many halakhic stringencies, including grinding and baking their own matzot before Passover and avoiding all processed foods — even sugar — during the holiday itself. Abba Shaul continued to keep these stringencies even after he established his own family.

At the age of 11, Abba Shaul entered Porat Yosef, the pre-eminent Sephardic yeshiva in Jerusalem. His first teacher was Rabbi Yehuda Tzadka (who was only 21 at the time) and his classmates included the future Chief Rabbi of Israel, Rabbi Ovadiah Yosef. Later, Abba Shaul advanced to the highest shiur, taught by the rosh yeshiva, Rabbi Ezra Attiya, with whom he developed a close bond. Abba Shaul abided by his rosh yeshiva's opinions on all matters and displayed the same approach to learning and to issuing halakhic directives as his mentor.

== Torah scholar ==
Abba Shaul displayed great dedication to Torah study. He learned and reviewed each subject dozens of times until he knew most of Shas and poskim (halakhic commentaries) by heart.

When Abba Shaul was 20 years old, Attiya selected him to be tested by Rabbi Eliezer Silver, a prominent American rabbi who was visiting Israel together with a prospective donor. Attiya had heard that in another yeshiva which this philanthropist had visited, only one boy was able to answer the rabbi's question, and only after 20 minutes. Silver asked Abba Shaul a difficult question in the obscure Talmudic order of Tohorot (laws of ritual purity). When Abba Shaul gave his answer, Silver remarked in astonishment that he had asked the same question of Rabbi Meir Simcha of Dvinsk (author of Ohr Sameach and Meschech Chochma) 40 years earlier, and that that sage had given the same answer. Abba Shaul later confided to Attiya that he had had a second answer to the question as well, but since the first answer secured the donation, he didn't want to show off.

In 1948, Abba Shaul married Hadassah, the daughter of Rabbi Yosef Shaharbani, a Torah scholar and son of the kabbalist Rabbi Yehoshua Shaharbani, who was a student of the Ben Ish Chai. Abba Shaul studied one-on-one with his father-in-law, and his new wife attended his public lectures every Shabbat. She also tape-recorded his general lecture at the yeshiva; many of his written works come from those tapes.

The couple was childless for many years. After ten miscarriages, Abba Shaul visited the Chazon Ish and the Belzer Rebbe, refusing to leave until each gave him a blessing for a child. Their only son, Eliyahu, was named after Abba Shaul's father.

After his marriage, Abba Shaul became a teacher at Talmud Torah Bnei Zion, which he had attended in his youth. He continued to study at Porat Yosef Yeshiva. In time, Attiya asked him to serve as rosh yeshiva, but he refused to accept that position as long as his first teacher, Tzadka, was still alive. He did agree to serve as a lecturer at the yeshiva. After Tzadka's death in 1983, Abba Shaul acceded to the position of rosh yeshiva of Porat Yosef.

== Rosh yeshiva ==
In his capacity as rosh yeshiva, Abba Shaul maintained a heavy teaching schedule. For four hours each morning, he lectured to students in the yeshiva; in the afternoons, he taught the laws of Shulchan Aruch to dayanim (rabbinical judges). On Friday afternoons, he gave a halakha class and question-and-answer session to a packed audience in the Ohel Rachel synagogue, and on Shabbat day he delivered a three-hour discourse in the synagogue. His diligence in Torah study was legendary; it is said that when he finished delivering a shiur, he was soaked with perspiration.

Abba Shaul was also well-versed in kabbalah. At first he learned privately on Friday nights. In the 1960s, however, seeing that the knowledge of kabbalah study was waning, he gathered a group of kabbalists and founded the Emet VeShalom Yeshiva for learning kabbalah at night. Once a year, on the yahrtzeit of the Rashash, he joined the group and showed his fluency in this esoteric wisdom.

He also penned thousands of halakhic responsa in response to queries from the public at large, covering a broad range of topics. Some of his responsa are printed in his sefer, She'eilot U'Teshuvot Ohr LeZion, and he is quoted in the responsa of Rabbi Ovadiah Yosef, who remained his good friend.

== Communal activities ==
Abba Shaul cared about his students as a father for his sons. He tried to make sure that all his students married; his rebbetzin would suggest shidduchim from the many girls who helped her in her house. Seeing that married students were unable to manage on a kollel stipend, he established a special Friday kollel and traveled to the United States to raise money for it.

Abba Shaul helped to launch a religious revival among Sephardi Jews in Israel as the founder of Ma'ayan HaChinuch HaTorani, a network of Sephardi schools which is the equivalent of Chinuch Atzmai. He promised to fund the first year of operation for any Talmud Torah that was opened in a city that did not already have one. He also worked to strengthen Sephardi communities in other countries. He traveled to England, France, Italy, Iran, Mexico, Panama, Colombia and the United States to establish rabbinical courts and to arrange for shochtim (ritual slaughterers), mohelim (ritual circumcisers), and rabbis.

Abba Shaul joined other Torah leaders in Israel to fight against edicts that threatened the Torah way of life. These included the battle to preserve the sanctity of Shabbat, the fight to close mixed-sex swimming pools, and the battle against autopsies for religious individuals.

In 1972, he assumed a prominent stand in opposition to the government's proposal of mandatory army service for girls. Together with Rabbi Yehuda Tzadka, he drafted a halakhic ruling which stated that mandatory army service for girls was in the category of yehareg ve'al yaavor ("be killed and do not transgress"). The text of his ruling was signed by 400 Torah leaders throughout Israel.

== Giver of blessings ==
He was also known for giving blessings that were fulfilled. Once a woman who had had three Caesarean sections was told that her next child would be born by Caesarean as well. She went to Abba Shaul and demanded, "I won't leave until the Rav guarantees me that I'll have a natural birth." He agreed. After the woman left, Abba Shaul's brother asked him, "How can you guarantee that?"

"I can't guarantee anything," he replied, "but what should I do? She wouldn't leave!"

Sure enough, the woman had a natural birth. When her husband came to the synagogue to announce the "miracle," Abba Shaul complained, "They are making me into an Admor!"

When his shamash (assistant) asked him why his blessings were always effective, he replied, "If you love everyone in Klal Yisrael, you can do it, too." To someone else, he explained, "God told Abraham, 'I will bless those who bless you.' When people come to me, they kiss my hand. They are blessing me. If someone blesses a Jew, they are blessed in return."

== Illness and death ==
In 1983, while delivering a eulogy at the funeral of Rabbi Yaakov Mutzafi, he suddenly felt ill and suffered a stroke a short while later. Half his body was paralyzed and his speech was slurred. Over the next 15 years, he suffered a series of mini-strokes that eventually made him a wheelchair user. Nevertheless, he continued to teach Torah and to involve himself in community affairs.

His vast knowledge from years of learning became evident in his later years. As his eyesight dimmed, he asked students to come and to read the Talmud to him. One boy recalled being corrected on a Rashi in the tractate of Nazir; another on a Tosafot in Gittin. His son said that Abba Shaul corrected him while he read the words of the Rambam to him.

He died in Jerusalem on 13 July 1998 (19 Tammuz 5758). An estimated 200,000 people of all denominations — Sephardic, Hasidic, Ashkenazic — attended his funeral. He and his wife are buried in the Sanhedria Cemetery in Jerusalem.

He was survived by his only son, Eliyahu, who is rosh yeshiva of Ohr LeZion Yeshiva in Jerusalem. R' Eliyahu died on Monday morning, 9 May, 2022, at the age of seventy.
