= Yosef family =

Israeli family

The Yosef family is an Israeli family noted for prominent Mizrahi Rabbis, and for its involvement in Israeli politics through the Shas political party. Rabbi Ovadia Yosef, Sephardic Chief Rabbi of Israel from 1973-1983 and founder of Shas, was considered the pre-eminent leader of Mizrahi Jews during and after his lifetime. Yosef also founded the Badatz Beit Yosef, an agency for certifying a food's kosher status. The agency is one of the largest in Israel, and is a major source of wealth for the family.

Ovadia Yosef's children and grandchildren are prominent in Israeli society, particularly in the Mizrahi and religious media. Two of Yosef's sons have succeeded him as Sephardic Chief Rabbi of Israel, and other family members have occupied prominent rabbinic roles, or are known for commercial, social or political activities. Since the death of Ovadia Yosef, feuds and an inheritance dispute have been reported among the family. The posthumous leaking of recordings of Ovadia Yosef's private discussions with family members about politicians played a prominent part in a leadership struggle within the Shas party.

== Ovadia Yosef ==
Ovadia Yosef was an Iraqi-born Rabbi, scholar of Jewish law, religious judge, Rosh yeshiva, the Sephardi Chief Rabbi of Israel from 1973 to 1983, and a founder and long-time spiritual leader of Israel's ultra-Orthodox Shas party. His family had adopted the surname Ovadia on arrival in Palestine in 1924 but as an adult he took on the last name Yosef, which had been his middle name.

He became the dominant religious and political figure among Jews of Middle Eastern origin, and was described as Gadol Hador - one of the greatest scholars of his generation. Yosef was known as a religious authority who would often rule leniently, marking him out from many other Haredi Jewish legal authorities.

== Prominent family members ==
=== Adina Bar-Shalom ===
Adina Bar-Shalom (b. 1945) is the eldest child of Ovadia Yosef. For many years, she worked as a seamstress and opened a bridal shop, before studying fashion design at the Shenkar College of Engineering and Design. Her husband Ezra Bar-Shalom was chief judge (dayan) of the Tel Aviv rabbinical courts, and subsequently from 1998 to 2011 served on as a religious judge on the Supreme Rabbinical Court of the Israeli rabbinate.

In 2001, she founded the Haredi College of Jerusalem, which aims to provide students with higher education at the same time as enabling them to maintain a strictly Haredi lifestyle. In 2014, Bar-Shalom was awarded the Israel Prize for lifetime achievement for her work advancing higher education in the ultra-Orthodox sector. In 2016, the college closed due to large debts and falling student intake.

Bar-Shalom is a noted peace activist, coming out for a two state solution and dialogue with Palestinians, and herself participating in a meeting with Palestinian Authority President Mahmoud Abbas. Bar-Shalom is a member of the Public Council of the Geneva Peace Initiative.

Bar-Shalom supported Shas, the political party founded by her father, and in 2014 founded and led its women's committee. However in 2018, she broke with Shas and founded a new party, Ahi Yisraeli, to run in the 2019 Israeli elections. Ahi Yisraeli pulled out before the election, and Bar Shalom endorsed Moshe Kahlon's Kulanu party.

=== Yaakov Yosef ===
Yaakov Yosef (1946-2013) was the eldest son and second child of Ovadia Yosef. From 1983-1984, he was a member of the Jerusalem city council for the then-new Shas party. He was subsequently elected to the Eleventh Knesset, again with Shas. However, he was removed at his father's behest from the party list for the next election.

He worked as a neighbourhood Rabbi of Givat Moshe, and led his own yeshiva. He associated with some of his father's rivals, such as Chief Rabbi Mordechai Eliyahu, and publicly dissented from his father's rulings and positions on a number of issues, including Ovadia Yosef's acceptance of the principle of peace negotiations with the Palestinians, and on various halakhic rulings. His father harshly criticised some of his rulings. The rift between Ovadia and Yaakov Yosef was such that Yaakov sat shiva for his mother separately from the rest of the family.

Yaakov Yosef died in 2013 after being diagnosed with cancer. He is the only one of Ovadia Yosef's children who predeceased him.

=== Avraham Yosef ===
Avraham Yosef, Ovadia and Margalit Yosef's fourth child and second son is a prominent rabbi. He served for 13 years in the Military Rabbinate, and subsequently became Chief Rabbi of Holon. Avraham Yosef was put forward by his father to be a candidate for the role of Sephardi Chief Rabbi of Israel in 2013. However, he withdrew after a criminal investigation over his actions as Chief Rabbi of Holon was made public. His younger brother Yitzhak Yosef was put forward as a candidate in his stead.

In 2015, he was indicted for fraud and breach of trust over allegations that he had used his rabbinical position to advance the business interests of the family kosher food certification agency. In 2017, he was convicted of breach of trust in this case, as part of a plea agreement in which he resigned all public office and committed not to take another public position for 7 years.

=== Yitzchak Yosef ===
Yitzhak Yosef (b. 1952) is a prominent Haredi rabbi and served as Sephardi Chief Rabbi of Israel from 2013 to 2024. He is the rosh yeshiva (head) of the Hazon Ovadia yeshiva founded by his father. Shortly after his election as Chief Rabbi and in the period around his father's death, many speculated that he would inherit his father's authority as the leading posek in the Mizrahi Haredi community.

=== David Yosef ===
David Yosef is the current Sephardic Chief Rabbi of the state of Israel, following his father and brother Yitzchak Yosef in the role. He was the Chief Rabbi of the Jerusalem neighborhood of Har Nof until October 2020. He was a member of the Shas party's Council of Torah Sages, which is the party's governing body. David stood down from his position as Chief Rabbi of Har Nof after a court case was launched, alleging that his rhetoric against Reform Judaism and Women of the Wall was incompatible with his status as a paid public servant.

In 2023, Yosef was widely reported to be one of the two main contenders to be Sephardic Chief Rabbi of Israel, on the expiration of his brother Yitzchak Yosef's term of office. The other reported candidate was Chief Rabbi of Beersheba Yehuda Deri, who is the brother of Shas' political leader Aryeh Deri. After elections were postponed twice and Yehuda Deri's death, Yosef was elected in September 2024.

=== Moshe Yosef ===
Moshe Yosef is a Rabbi, head of the kosher food certification company Badatz Beit Yosef, and head of the Maor Yisrael press, which publishes the works of Ovadia Yosef. He and his wife Yehudit lived with his father Ovadia Yosef for years before the latter's death. Ovadia Yosef's will designated Moshe Yosef as the sole inheritor of almost the entirety of Ovadia Yosef's multi-million shekel estate upon his death. An inheritance dispute resulted, which was ultimately settled by Moshe Yosef and his siblings before reaching court.

== Other ==
=== Ovadia Cohen marriage ===
The same-sex wedding of Ovadia Cohen, Ovadia Yosef's grandson, was widely reported in Israeli and international media. The Yosef family spurned the event for religious reasons.

=== Leaked recordings ===
Following the death of Ovadia Yosef, a leadership struggle between Eli Yishai and Aryeh Deri came into public view. Yosef had made Deri co-chairman of Shas with Yishai on Deri's return to front-line politics in 2012 after a corruption conviction, and then made Deri sole leader before his death. After Yishai left Shas to start the rival Yachad party, a recording of Ovadia Yosef supporting Yishai over Deri for the Shas leadership was leaked.

The recording led Deri to offer his resignation (which was rejected). Although Moshe Yosef and his wife Yehudit were rumoured to have leaked the recordings, several of Ovadia Yosef's children, including Moshe, publicly repudiated the use of the recordings of their father. While David Yosef attacked Eli Yishai over the leak of the recordings, Yitzchak Yosef convened a rabbinical court aiming to prevent any further leaks.
