= Avraham Yosef =

Former chief rabbi of Holon

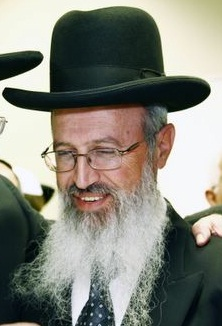

Avraham Yosef (Hebrew: אברהם יוסף) is the former chief rabbi of Holon and Sephardi representative on the Chief Rabbinate Council (Moetzet Harabbanut Harashit). He stepped down from his positions after pleading guilty to breach of trust, after using his office to promote his family's financial interests.

== Background ==
Avraham Yosef is a son of Shas' spiritual leader, and former Israeli chief rabbi, Ovadia Yosef, and a brother of rabbi Yaakov Yosef, a Jerusalem politician who was a member of the eleventh Knesset. His other brother, Yitzhak Yosef, has served as the Chief Sephardi Rabbi of Israel.

Yosef served for thirteen years in the Military Rabbinate of the Israeli Defense Forces, and in 2013 would become the first choice of his father to be nominated for the position of Sepharadi chief rabbi, but would pull out due to negative publicity concerning a 2010 ruling on judges joining a prayer minyan.

Yosef was also known for his halakhic lectures and decisions, and he became a popular halakhic arbiter on the Haredi radio station Kol Chai, building a public reputation within segments of the Israeli Orthodox community.

== Chief Rabbi of Holon ==
Avraham Yosef was appointed Chief Rabbi of the coastal city of Holon in 1998, holding oversight of local kashrut matters in Holon, and at times in Or Yehuda from 2008 to 2011.

In 2014, after an investigation by the Israel Police’s National Fraud Unit, prosecutors moved to charge Yosef on suspicion of extortion, breach of trust, and fraud, alleging that he had abused his authority by demanding that business owners seeking “mehadrin” kosher certification use Badatz Beit Yosef, a kosher supervision organization owned by his family, while failing to provide lawful alternatives in contravention of Chief Rabbinate guidelines. Police claimed he threatened to withhold certification otherwise.

In 2015, the Tel Aviv District Attorney’s Office indicted Yosef for fraud and breach of trust over allegations that he had used his position as chief rabbi to advance the business interests of his family's kosher food certification. Yosef was convicted for breach of trust in 2017 by a Tel Aviv Magistrates Court.

He had reached a plea agreement with the prosecution to resign all his communal offices, and not to take another public position for 7 years after his conviction. In November 2017, he was sentenced to a five-month suspended jail term and ordered to pay NIS 75,000 in restitution.

== 2007 Rabbinate shmita decision ==
During 2007, Sephardic and Ashkenazi rabbis were at odds over whether to allow the sale of land in order to permit its cultivation during shmita.

Later in the year the Chief Rabbinate of Israel set up a special body, which included Avraham Yosef alongside Rabbi Ze’ev Weitman, to administer heter mechira arrangements for that shmita cycle. However, the Israeli Supreme Court subsequently overturned related rulings on how local rabbis could enforce shmita-related kashrut standards. It then commanded the Chief Rabbinate to rescind its initial policy and establish a single national ruling – in order to mitigate any legal and economic complications.
