= Ovadia Yosef =

Talmudic scholar, posek and Sephardi Chief Rabbi of Israel from 1973 to 1983

Maran Ovadia Yosef
- עוֹבַדְיָה יוֹסֵף
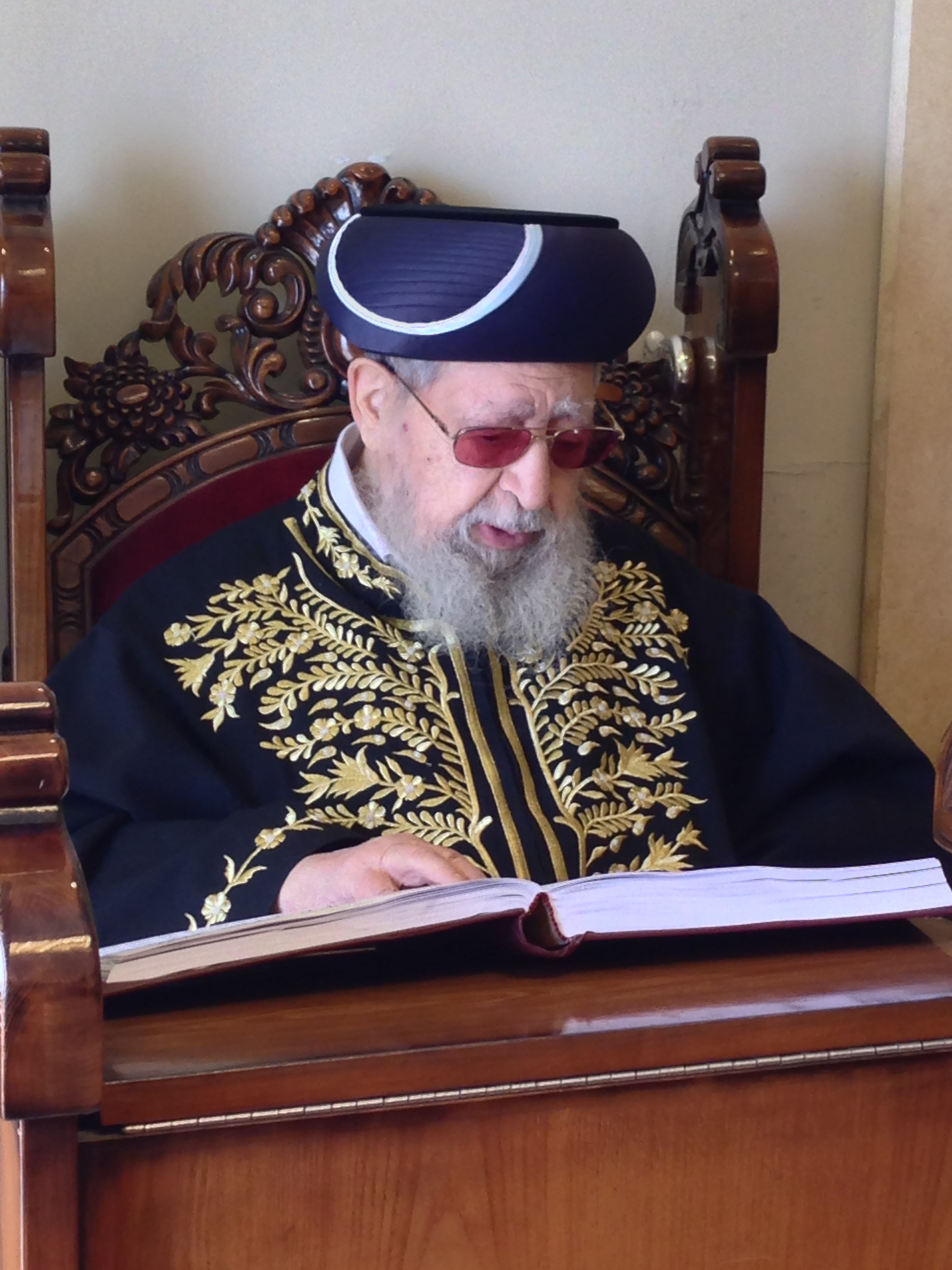
- Yosef in the synagogue below his house
- Title: Rishon LeZion

Personal life
- Born: September 24, 1920 Baghdad, Mandatory Iraq
- Died: October 7, 2013 (aged 93) Jerusalem, Israel
- Buried: Sanhedria Cemetery
- Spouse: Margalit Yosef (Fattal)
- Children: 11, including Yitzhak Yosef, Ya'akov Yosef, David Yosef and Adina Bar-Shalom
- Parent(s): Yaakov and Gorjiya Ovadia
- Dynasty: Yosef family
- Education: Porat Yosef Yeshiva
- Occupation: Author, politician, rabbi, talmudic scholar, and recognized halakhic authority

Religious life
- Religion: Judaism
- Denomination: Sephardi Haredi Judaism

Jewish leader
- Predecessor: Yitzhak Nissim
- Successor: Mordechai Eliyahu
- Organisation: Chief Rabbinate of Israel
- Began: 1972
- Ended: 1983
- Other: Sephardi Chief Rabbi of Tel Aviv; Spiritual leader of the Shas political party
- Residence: Jerusalem
- Dynasty: Yosef family
- Semikhah: Ben Zion Hai Uziel

Ovadia Yosef (Hebrew: עוֹבַדְיָה יוֹסֵף, romanized: Ovadya Yosef, lit. 'Obadiah Joseph', Arabic: عَبْد اللّٰه يُوْسُف, romanized: ‘Abd Allāh Yūsuf; September 24, 1920 – October 7, 2013), also known as Maran (Hebrew: מרן; lit. 'Our Master'), was an Iraqi-born Talmudic scholar, hakham, posek, and the Sephardi Chief Rabbi of Israel from 1972 to 1983. Often called a Gadol Yisrael ("great one of Israel"), Yosef is regarded as one of the most influential Sephardic religious authorities of all time. He was also a founder and longtime spiritual leader of Israel's religious Shas party. Yosef's responsa were highly regarded in Haredi circles, particularly among Mizrahi communities, which considered him "the most important living halakhic authority".

== Biography ==
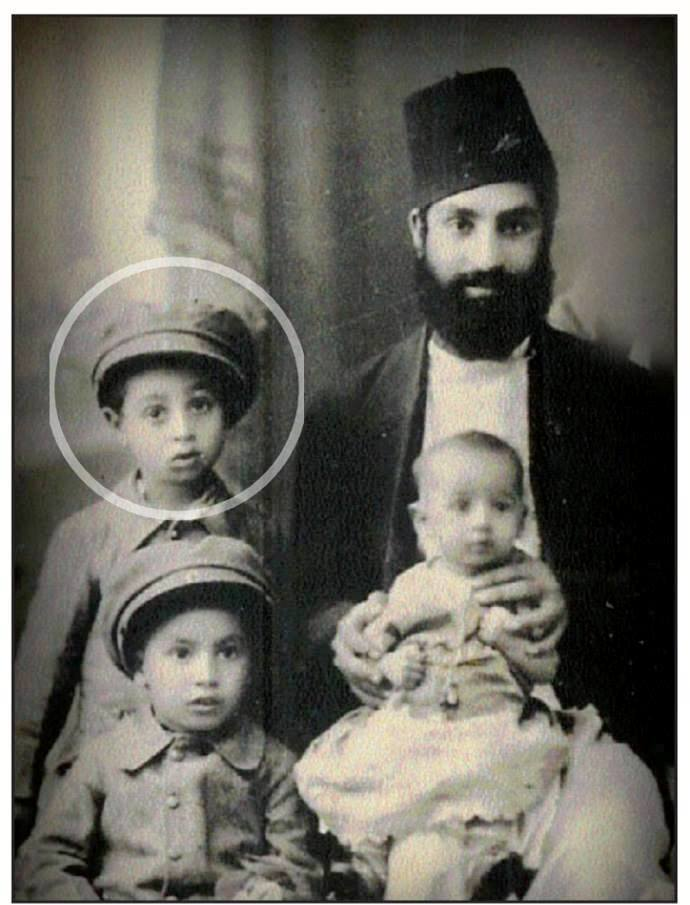
Yosef as a child with his family

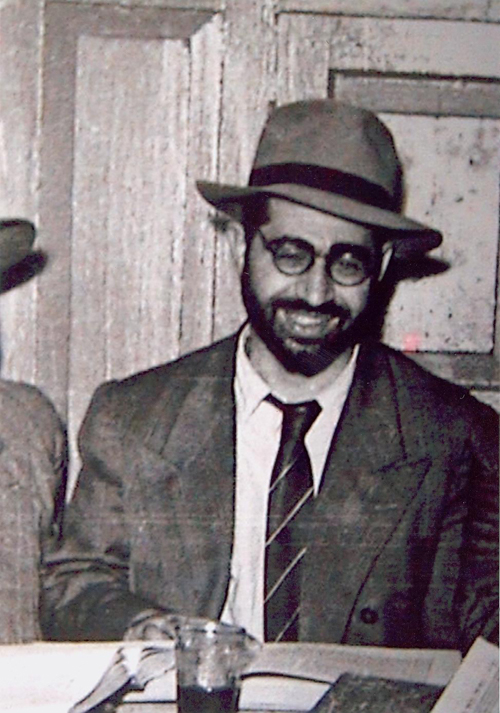
Yosef in the 1940s or 1950s

=== Early life ===
Yosef was born in Baghdad, Mandatory Iraq, to Yaakov ben Ovadia and his wife, Gorgia. In 1924, when he was four years old, he immigrated to Jerusalem, Mandatory Palestine with his family. In Jerusalem, the family adopted the surname "Ovadia". Later in life, he changed his surname to his middle name, "Yosef", to avoid the confusion of being called "Ovadia Ovadia".

The family settled in Jerusalem's Beit Yisrael neighborhood, where Yaakov operated a grocery store. The family was poor, and Yosef was forced to work at a young age. His rosh yeshiva (dean) petitioned his father to ensure he would not miss school to help the family. He learned in Talmud Torah Bnei Zion in the Bukharim quarter, where his passion and skill for Torah study was apparent. His literary career began at age 9 with a commentary on Reshit Chochmah, which he penned in the margins.

In 1933, Sadqa Hussein prevailed upon Yaakov to send his son to Porat Yosef Yeshiva. He soon advanced to the highest shiur taught by Ezra Attiya, the rosh yeshiva.

Yosef composed his first sefer, together with two friends, called Machberet Ha'atakat Hidot.

In 1937, Yaakov Dweck sent Yosef to give the daily halakha (Jewish law) lesson in Ben Ish Hai (book) in his stead at the Ohel Rachel Synagogue for the Persian Jewish community in Beit Yisrael. In the course of giving this shiur, Yosef dissented many times with the stringent opinions of the Ben Ish Hai, who preferred the rulings of the Arizal to Yosef Karo. This was a defining moment for Yosef, who had found a place to air his opinions while simultaneously learning how to deal with the criticism he was receiving from many in his audience, especially his fellow Iraqi Jews. A number of notable rabbis, among them Yitzhak Nissim, rebuked him over the years for his positions, even burning his first halakha sefer, Hazon Ovadia. But Attiya encouraged Yosef to continue ruling according to his own understanding. Yosef's objections to Ben Ish Hai, for many years in handwritten form only, were printed beginning in 1998 with the appearance of his Halikhot Olam.

Yosef received rabbinic ordination at age 20. He became a longtime friend of several members of his class who went on to assume prominent leadership positions in the Sephardi Jewish world, including Rabbis Ben Zion Abba Shaul, Baruch Ben Haim, Yehuda Moallem, and Zion Levy.

=== Residing in Egypt ===
In 1947, Yosef was invited to Cairo by Aharon Choueka, founder of yeshiva Ahavah VeAchvah, to teach in his school. At Ben-Zion Meir Hai Uziel's request, Yosef also served as head of the Cairo beth din (rabbinical court). Yosef considered religious observance lax in Egypt, both in the Jewish community at large and among its rabbis. One of the major halakhic issues was the lack of any organised system of kashrut, which led to conflict between him and other members of the community. Due to these events Yosef resigned from his position just two years after arriving in Cairo. About a year later he returned to what in the meantime had become Israel.

=== Return to Israel ===
Back in Israel, Yosef began studying at midrash "Bnei Zion", then headed by Tzvi Pesach Frank. He also served on the rabbinical court in Petah Tikva. In his first term as a dayan (rabbinic judge), at age 30, he wrote a halakhic ruling favoring Yibbum over Halitza, which contradicted a religious ruling made by the Chief Rabbinate of Israel a year earlier, which had forbidden Yibbum.

In 1951–1952 (Note: On the Hebrew calendar: 5712) he published his first halakha sefer, Hazon Ovadia, on the laws of Passover. The book won much praise and received the approval of the two Chief Rabbis of Israel at the time, Ben-Zion Meir Hai Uziel and Yitzhak HaLevi Herzog. Two years later he founded Or HaTorah Yeshiva for gifted Sephardic yeshiva students. This yeshiva (which was not open long) was the first of many he established, later with the help of his sons, to facilitate Torah education for Sephardic Jews, to provide leadership for the community in future generations. In 1953–54 (Note: On the Hebrew calendar: 5714) and 1955–56 (Note: On the Hebrew calendar: 5716) he published the first two volumes of his major work, Yabia Omer, which also received much praise.

Between 1958 and 1965, Yosef served as a dayan in the Jerusalem district Beth Din. He was then appointed to the Supreme Rabbinical Court of Appeals in Jerusalem, becoming the Chief Sephardic Rabbi of Tel Aviv in 1968, a position he held until his election as Chief Sephardic Rabbi of Israel in 1972.

=== Rishon LeZion ===
In 1972, Yosef was elected Sephardic Chief Rabbi of Israel by a majority vote of 81 to 68, replacing Yitzhak Nissim. His candidacy was criticised by some, as he was competing against an incumbent chief rabbi for the first time in the history of that office. The election process was characterised by tension and political turmoil due to the Langer controversy and the tense relations between Yosef and Nissim. In the same election, Shlomo Goren was chosen as the Ashkenazi Chief Rabbi of Israel, with whom Yosef's relationship proved difficult. The Chief Rabbinate Council was controlled by Goren, and for some time thereafter Yosef felt there was no point in attending its sessions.

=== Entry into politics ===
In 1984, Yosef founded the Shas party in response to minimal representation of Sephardic Jews in the Ashkenazi-dominated Agudat Yisrael. It has since become a formidable political force, becoming a part of the coalition in most of the elected governments. He later took a less active role in politics, but remained the party's spiritual leader until his death.

=== Weekly lectures ===
For over 50 years, Yosef gave weekly Saturday night lessons in the Yazdim synagogue. These lectures were live-streamed by satellite as well as recorded, with over 100,000 people worldwide watching them.

=== Assassination plot ===
In April 2005, Israeli security services arrested three people whom they accused of plotting to kill Yosef. The Shin Bet claimed they were all members of the Popular Front for the Liberation of Palestine. One of the three, Musa Darwish, was convicted on December 15, 2005, of Yosef's attempted murder, and of throwing firebombs at vehicles on the Jerusalem-Ma'aleh Adumim road. He was sentenced to 12 years in prison and three years' probation. A second man, Salah Hamouri, said he was innocent of the charges, but accepted a sentence of seven years in exchange for admitting his guilt.

=== Family ===
When Yosef was 24, he married the 17-year-old Margalit Fattal, who was born in Syria to Avraham HaLevi Fattal. They had eleven children.

1. Adina Bar-Shalom (b. 1945) is the founder of the first academic college for Haredi women in Jerusalem. She studied design at the Shenkar College of Engineering and Design with her father's approval. She is married to Ezra Bar-Shalom, former Chaver Beth Din of the Supreme Rabbinical Court.
2. Ya'akov Yosef (1947–2013) was an Israeli rabbi and politician who served as a member of the Knesset for Shas between 1984 and 1988. He is the father of Yonatan Yosef.
3. Malca Sasson was a nursery teacher for over 30 years.
4. Avraham Yosef (b. 1949) is the former Chief Rabbi of Holon, Israel, and a Sephardi representative on the Chief Rabbinate Council.
5. Yafa Cohen.
6. Yitzhak Yosef (b. 1952) is the former Sephardi Chief Rabbi of Israel, (Note: Also known as the Rishon LeZion.) the rosh yeshiva of Yeshivat Hazon Ovadia, and the author of a popular set of books on Jewish law called Yalkut Yosef.
7. Rivka Chikotai, twin sister of Sara, is married to Ya'akov Chikotai, one of the chief rabbis of Modi'in-Maccabim-Re'ut.
8. Sara Toledano, twin sister of Rivka, is an artist, Head of the Yabiya Omer Beit Midrash, and an Av Beit Din in Jerusalem. She is married to Mordechai Toledano.
9. David Yosef (b. 1960), married to Sofia, is the head of the Yechaveh Da'at Kollel, the chief neighbourhood rabbi of Har Nof, and credited with introducing his best friend Aryeh Deri to his father. He was appointed to Moetzet Chachmei HaTorah after his father died. On September 29, 2024, he was appointed to the role of Sephardic Chief Rabbi of Israel, the Rishon LeZion.
10. Leah Butbul.
11. Moshe Yosef (b. 1966), a rabbi married to Yehudit. Both lived and cared for Yosef in his apartment. Moshe is the head of the Badatz Beit Yosef kashrut agency and of the Maor Yisrael Talmud Torah, which also publishes his father's works.

=== Final years and death ===
Yosef resided in Jerusalem's Har Nof neighbourhood. He often wore tinted eyeglasses, as his eyes were very sensitive to light. These became a trademark of his. Yosef remained an active public figure in political and religious life in his capacity as the spiritual leader of the Shas political party, and through his regular weekly sermons. He was called the Posek HaDor ("Posek of the present generation"), Gadol HaDor ("great/est (one of) the generation"), Maor Yisrael ("Light of Israel"), and Maran.

On January 13, 2013, Yosef collapsed during Shacharit at his synagogue in Har Nof and was having difficulty using his left hand. After being seen by a physician at his home, he was hospitalized at Hadassah Medical Center after suffering what was believed to be a minor stroke.

On September 21, 2013, because of his worsening health, Yosef was admitted to Hadassah Ein Kerem hospital. Two days after undergoing surgery for the implantation of a pacemaker on September 22, Yosef was sedated and placed on a respirator. He died at the hospital on October 7, 2013, after a "general systemic failure". His funeral in Jerusalem was the largest in Israel's history, with an estimated attendance of 850,000. Some religious authorities have said it may have been the largest in-gathering of Jews since the Second Temple period; other estimates put the number in attendance lower, between 273,000 and 450,000. Yosef was buried beside his wife in the Sanhedria Cemetery. During the week-long shiva mourning period, his family was expected to receive thousands of condolence callers in a mourning tent set up on their street, which police closed to vehicular traffic. Security guards were also posted at the cemetery, where Yosef's grave became a pilgrimage site for thousands of people.

== Halakhic approach and worldview ==
=== Meta-halakha: Restoring the past glory ===
Yosef frequently made use of the slogan "Restore past glory" (Hebrew: להחזיר עטרה ליושנה; lit. '[To] restore the crown to its former [place]') as a metaphor embodying both his social and halakhic agenda.

On a social level, it is widely viewed as a call to pursue a political agenda that will restore the pride of the Mizrahi Jews in Israeli society, who historically suffered from discrimination and were generally of lower socioeconomic status than their Ashkenazi counterparts.

From a halakhic perspective, the metaphor is more complex. It is widely agreed by rabbis and secular researchers alike that the 'crown' of the metaphor refers to the halakhic supremacy Yosef attaches to the rulings of Yosef Karo. According to Yosef's approach, Karo is crowned as the Mara D'Atra of the Land of Israel, and thus all Jews living within his realm of authority are bound by his rulings. Yosef says this explicitly and strongly in Yalkut Yosef:

Even if a hundred acharonim disagree with him...no teacher is permitted to rule with chumra (lit. 'stringency') contrary to Maran's (i.e. Yosef Karo's) instructions to rule leniently, even if many disagree with Maran...and it is not even permitted to act with chumra where Maran has ruled leniently on the matter, since the rulings of Maran, who is the Mara D'Atra and we have received his instructions, were determined as Halakha to Moses at Sinai over which there is no dispute, and he who deviates right or left dishonours his teachers.

Some disagreement persists over exactly whom Yosef considers bound by Karo's rulings.

Ratzon Arusi argues that Yosef distinguishes between his ideal and reality. Ideally, all Jews of the Land of Israel should be bound by Karo's rulings, but practicality dictates that Sephardic and Mizrahi Jews should unite under them first. As Arusi puts it:

The unity of Israel is desirable, and shall be achieved by a unified system of halakhic ruling. A unified system of halakhic ruling will be achieved, in his opinion, by a consolidation around the tradition of the Land of Israel, which he thinks is the tradition of the Sephardim to rule as does Karo in the Shulchan Aruch. However, the reality at this time is different. Every community retains its own traditions, and thus halakha should be ruled for each community according to its own tradition. However, because he believes that there is a trend of Ashkenazi ruling dominating, he cries aloud to save and preserve the Sephardic system of ruling.

Zvi Zohar argues that Yosef adopts a melting pot approach, in that he seeks to unify the traditions of all Jews in Israel, Sephardic and Ashkenazi alike. Zohar claims that Yosef's main distinction is not between Ashkenazim and Sephardim but between the Land of Israel and the diaspora. In his view, Yosef seeks to apply Karo's rulings to the entire Land of Israel, but not necessarily outside it. According to Zohar, this represents an anti-Diaspora and "anti-Colonialist" approach, since it seeks to strip the various immigrant communities of their traditions from their countries of origin and replace them with the custom of the Land of Israel, rather than importing and implanting foreign customs in Israel. He compares Yosef and religious reformers such as Martin Luther and Muhammad ibn Abd-al-Wahhab, and claims that Yosef has adopted a religious restorative-reformist worldview. Specifically, he argues that Yosef's halakhic approach is not, as Yosef attempts to portray it, a return to a traditional form of Sephardic ruling, but rather an innovative formulation of a particular Sephardic approach to halakha that Yosef himself fashioned.

Binyamin Lau disagrees with both of the preceding interpretations. According to Lau, Yosef claims that all Sephardic Jews accepted Karo's rulings as binding in the diaspora, but over time deviated from them. Presently, upon their return to the Land of Israel where Karo is the Mara D'atra, they should return to adhering to his rulings. Thus, Lau believes that Yosef directs his rulings only at Sephardic and Mizrahi Jews, since the Ashkenazi Jews never accepted Karo's rulings. Lau views Yosef as operating on two fronts: the first against the Ashkenazi leadership that seeks to apply Ashkenazi rulings and customs to the Sephardim, and the second against the Sephardic and Mizrahi communities, in demanding that they unite under Karo's rulings.

In any case, it is agreed that alongside the conservative aspects of his approach to halakha there are also significant reforms: his preference for Karo's rulings and his preference for leniency over chumra. The fulfillment of his halakhic vision has entailed significant clashes with his Ashkenazi counterparts. Of his predecessors in the Tel Aviv-Yafo Rabbinate, Yosef wrote:

And I have heard that there are those who claim that since the Chief Rabbis of Tel Aviv-Yafo who preceded me set a custom of ruling with chumra, the custom is not to be changed. And it is not true that I have been allowed space to express myself. And in any case it is known that the Rabbis who preceded me were subordinate to their Ashkenazi counterparts, the Gaon Rabbi Benzion Uziel z"l was subordinate to the Gaon Rabbi Avraham Yitzhak Kook z"l...and the Gaon Rabbi Yaakov Moshe Toledano z"l in his capacity as Chief Rabbi of Tel Aviv-Yafo could not even raise his head towards his colleague, may he be chosen for a good life, the Gaon Rabbi Isser Yehuda Unterman Shlit"a and to disagree with him on halakha...But I who am not subordinate, praise be to God, will stand on my guard to Restore past Glory and instruct according to Maran whose instructions we have received.

=== Preference for leniency ===
Yosef adopted the Talmudic dictum "The power of leniency is greater". Therefore, one of his fundamental principles of halakhic ruling is that lenient rulings should be preferred over chumra. Yosef saw this as one of the distinguishing characteristics of the Sephardic approach to halakha versus the Ashkenazi approach. In one ruling, he quoted Chaim Joseph David Azulai as saying:

The Sephardim are characterized by the quality of kindness, and therefore are lenient in the halakha, and the Ashkenazim are characterized by the quality of power, (Note: Referring to the sefirah of Gevurah (strength), also known as Din (strict judgment).) and therefore they rule strictly.

Yosef considered this principle an ideal, so that if

one is asked [a question] on a ritual-halakhic matter and succeeds in proving that a lenient position is a correct one from a halakhic standpoint, he sees this as a positive achievement.

In Yosef's opinion, the severity of Ashkenazi poskim results from their method of teaching and lack of familiarity with the Mishnah, Talmud, and poskim. In a 1970 article about Jacob Saul Elyashar, Yosef wrote:

But since [the Ashkenazim] are cautious in their teaching, they do not [bravely] rule halakha l'ma'aseh (lit. 'practical halakha'), especially on matters of new developments or new technologies which create halakhic problems, it is far from them to be interested and express their view of Daat Torah...Our Rabbi the Gaon Jacob Saul Elyashar was among those few virtuous ones who took upon themselves this burden to resolve the actual problems of his time, and among them are some which are relevant to this day, and he did not avoid answering his questioner...

Yosef regarded ruling with severity as especially harmful in the current generation ("the generation of freedom and liberty"), since strict ruling might lead people not to comply with the halakha. In Yabia Omer, he writes: "And truly, the growth of chumrot leads to leniency in the body of the Torah."

==== Examples of lenient rulings ====
Following this principle of leniency Yosef made a number of halakhic rulings which are significantly more lenient than those made by his Ashkenazi Haredi counterparts. Among them are:

- That it is permissible for boys and girls to study together up to the age of 9.
- That a married woman who covers her hair may expose a few centimeters of hair from beneath the covering at the front.
- That it is permissible for a female widow or divorcée to wear a wig as a head covering, despite prohibiting it for married women (see below).
- That widows of Israel Defense Forces (IDF) soldiers, even unrecoverable soldiers, would not be unable to remarry.
- That it is permissible for unmarried women to leave their hair loose and untied.
- That, when investigating whether a person might be a mamzer, as much plausible deniability as possible ought to be granted, so as to avoid condemning the person to mamzer status.

==== The least of evils ====
Yosef aimed to encourage maximal observance of mitzvot among as many Israelis as possible. To achieve this, "he is willing to follow a halakhic policy which, on the one hand, will minimize violations of the halakha, but on the other, concedes absolute adherence to the halakha". This is evident in a number of his rulings: providing kashrut certification to a restaurant that serves milk and meat; the slaughter of a chicken where there is a concern of it being terefah; and the wearing of pants by women.

==== Turning a blind eye ====
Yosef applied a policy of turning a blind eye to deviations from the halakha in circumstances where, if strict adherence to the halakha were required, it is likely that it would not be followed at all. Examples of this include the recital of the priestly benediction by Kohanim who do not have a religious lifestyle, and a shaliach tzibur or person performing a Torah reading who shaves with a razor.

=== Sinai Adif ===
In the Talmudic debate over Sinai and Oker Harim, Yosef was of the opinion that Sinai is preferable. Specifically, he emphasizes that the Sephardic system of learning, which emphasizes learning halakha in depth, is superior to the common approach in many Ashkenazi schools, which relies on deep analysis of gemara employing pilpul, without reaching to the halakhic conclusions. This preference is based upon his support for ruling halakha on practical contemporary issues rather than ruling halakha as a purely theoretical pursuit. In a eulogy he wrote for Yaakov Ades, his teacher at Porat Yosef Yeshiva, he said:

The distinguished deceased who was our Teacher and Rabbi at Porat Yosef Yeshiva in the Old City taught us to [learn halakha for practical purposes] and not engage in futile pilpulim which shall fade and be carried away by the wind. Regretfully there are yeshivas where one who learns from Yoreh De'ah must hide in back rooms lest he be noticed and labelled an "idler" for learning a "psak" halakha, and the shame of a thief [will be upon him] if he is found and...anger and disgrace [too].

According to Yosef, the preoccupation with pilpul at the expense of learning halakha in depth causes lack of knowledge among Ashkenazi poskim, which in turn leads to unnecessary severity in making halakhic rulings, since the posek is unaware of lenient rulings and approaches to halakha used by previous rabbis upon which the posek could rely to rule leniently.

=== Attitude towards Kabbalah ===
Yosef was sometimes willing to accept rulings which rely on the rulings of the Arizal, provided that these do not contradict rulings by Karo. In some instances, particularly in Jewish prayer, Yosef championed Kabbalistic considerations — even at the expense of Karo's rulings. Nevertheless, in many cases, he came out strongly against the rulings, saying, "We have no business with mysticism", and rejecting rulings based upon the Zohar, and the Kabbalah more generally. This position is contrary to many (but not all) traditional long-standing Sephardic rulings on halakha, including by many Sephardic poskim to this day. In contrast with the position of Chaim Joseph David Azulai, who wrote that, "None may reply after (i.e. dispute the rulings of) the Ari", Yosef argues that no special weight should be attached to the rulings of the Ari, and the ordinary principles of halakhic ruling should continue to apply. He wrote:

As is written in the book Iggrot HaTanya in the name of the Gaon of Vilna who does not believe that the Kabbalah of the Ari in its entirety is wholly from the mouth of Elijah z"l, [but rather] only a small portion is from the mouth of Elijah z"l, and the rest is from his great knowledge, and it is not required to believe it...and thus wrote Rabbi Chaim Volozhin in the foreword to his book...and if so, why all this awe that we should put aside the words of all the Poskim and all of the laws [simply] because of the opinion of the Ari z"l?

Yosef's attitude towards the Kabbalah, the rulings of the Ari, and consequently the rulings of the Ben Ish Hai have been the cause of strong disagreements between him and Jewish immigrants from the Muslim world in Israel, especially the Jews of Iraq. The rulings of the Ben Ish Hai were at the heart of the disagreement between him and the Chief Rabbis Yitzhak Nissim and Mordechai Eliyahu.

=== Attitude towards minhag and traditions ===
Yosef gave strong preference to the written word, and did not attribute significant weight to minhagim and traditions which are not well anchored in the halakha. For example, he expressed opposition to two minhagim observed in the synagogues of North African Jewry: standing during the reading of the Ten Commandments, and the involvement of the congregation in certain parts of the prayer service. His attempts to change popular and deeply rooted traditions have led to opposition to his approach among some North African rabbis.

Breslov Hasidim have the custom of going on a pilgrimage to the tomb of Nachman of Breslov in Uman for Rosh Hashanah. Yosef was highly critical of this practice, and has stated:

There are here [in Israel] the tombs of the greatest sages in the world. Holy Tannaim, amongst whom even the least was [able to perform] resurrection of the dead. They leave and shame these Geonim by going to Uman.

=== Halakhic rulings ===
Yosef is generally considered one of the leading halakhic authorities, particularly for Sephardi and Mizrahi Jews, who bestowed upon him the honorific title of "Maran".

His best-known legal rulings include:

- In 1973, as Chief Sephardic Rabbi of Israel, he ruled, based on the Radbaz, Maharikash, and other opinions, that the Ethiopian Beta Israel were full Jews and should be brought to Israel. A number of other authorities later made similar rulings, including the Chief Ashkenazi Rabbi Shlomo Goren, who took rulings from Abraham Isaac Kook, and other poskim. Other notable poskim, from non-Zionist Ashkenazi circles, preferred a giyur l'chumra which served as a protective measure, for the Ethiopian Jews to immerse themselves before immigrating, to avoid any doubt.
- That it is legitimate and permissible to give territory from the Land of Israel to achieve a genuine peace. When the Oslo Accords were followed by the Second Intifada, this opinion was retracted.
- Supported the sale of the land during the Sabbatical year, following the Sephardic tradition.
- That it is prohibited for fellow Jews to ascend the Temple Mount in Jerusalem in this day and age due to its extreme sanctity and the people's inability to purify themselves with the ash-water of the Red Heifer.
- Ordered the Shas political party to vote in favour of a law recognizing brain death as death for legal purposes. The Ashkenazi Haredi political party United Torah Judaism voted against the law on instructions from their spiritual leader, Yosef Shalom Eliashiv.
- Allowing the wives of IDF soldiers who have been missing in action for a long time to remarry, a verdict known as "the release of agunot" (התרת עגונות).
- That a woman should not wear a wig (sheitel) as a form of hair covering, but should wear headscarves (or snoods / hats / berets) instead. (According to Jewish law, married women must cover their hair in public for reasons of modesty. Some women wear sheitels for this purpose.)

== Attitude towards the State of Israel and its citizens ==
=== Ethiopian Jews ===
Yosef is often regarded as the pivotal force behind bringing Ethiopian Jews to Israel. In the 1970s, Yosef ruled that Ethiopian Jews were halachically Jewish and campaigned for the Ethiopian aliyah to Israel. Pnina Tamano-Shata said of Yosef: "I started crying, probably in gratitude to all that he's done, the humane form of address, 'our brothers.' He was also a leader. He called on the authorities to save Ethiopia's Jews and bring them to Israel. It shows his great love for others."

=== Attitude to Zionism ===
Yosef held a halakhically ambivalent view towards Zionism as the Atchalta De'Geulah (lit. 'beginning of the redemption'). Many Religious Zionists, in contrast, view Israel as the first flowering of the redemption. In a halakhic ruling regarding Israeli Independence Day, Yosef acknowledged that the Jewish people experienced a miracle with the establishment of the State of Israel; however, since the miracle did not include all of the Jewish people,

If the congregation wishes to say Hallel without a blessing after the prayer service, they should not be prevented.

Yosef's position could be seen as a middle ground between the Religious Zionists, for whom saying Hallel is compulsory, and the Ashkenazi Haredim, who do not say Hallel at all.

In a newspaper interview in which Shas was accused of being anti-Zionist, Yosef responded:

What is anti-Zionist? It is a lie, it is a term which they have concocted themselves. I served for ten years as a Chief Rabbi – a key public position in the State of Israel. In what way are we not Zionists? We pray for Zion, for Jerusalem and its inhabitants, for Israel and the rabbis and their students. What is Zionist? By our understanding, a Zionist is a person who loves Zion and practices the commandment of settling the land. Whenever I am overseas I encourage aliyah. In what way are they more Zionist than us?

In 2010, Yosef and Shas' Moetzet Chachamei HaTorah (Council of Torah Sages) approved Shas' membership in the World Zionist Organization, making Shas the first officially Zionist Haredi party in Israel.

=== Yeshiva students and military service ===
Yosef regarded the wars fought by the State of Israel as falling within the halakhic classification of Milkhemet Mitzvah. Nevertheless, he encouraged young students to remain in the yeshivas, rather than be drafted into the military, because, "despite the sensitivity which Rabbi Yosef feels towards the Israel Defense Forces, he is deeply rooted in the rabbinic tradition of the yeshivas in the Land of Israel, and holds their position which opposes the integration of yeshiva students in the military". Binyamin Lau makes a cautious distinction between Yosef's public rhetoric, which presents a unified front with the Ashkenazi Haredim, and between internal discussions, where Yosef was said to be more receptive to solving the problem of integrating the Haredim into the military.

Yosef's grandson points out his grandfather's positive attitude towards the IDF, in that whenever the Torah Ark is opened, Yosef blesses "Mi Shebeirach" for IDF soldiers. Yosef's son, Avraham Yosef, served in the IDF as a military rabbi for 13 years.

=== Secular Israelis ===
Yosef frequently referred to the present situation in Israeli and Jewish society as "the generation of freedom and liberty". By this, Yosef referred to a modern reality of a Jewish community which is generally not committed to the halakha, and where rabbinic authority has lost its centrality. In this context, Yosef drew a distinction between those who profess a secular ideology, and those who are non-observant merely in the sense of a weak or incomplete commitment to halakha accompanied by a strong belief in God and the Torah:

And I knew clearly when I was in Egypt, that many of these people [who worked on Shabbat for their livelihood], when they leave work, are careful not to desecrate the Sabbath, and indeed do not smoke on the Sabbath and all that follows from that. And some of them pray on the Sabbath in the first minyan so as to get to their workplace on time, and in secret their soul would weep that they are forced to desecrate the Sabbath for their livelihood.

This latter grouping of Jews, known in Israel as Masortiyim, (Note: Not to be confused with Conservative Judaism, which is sometimes called Masorti Judaism.) are mainly Mizrahi Jews who practice aspects of Judaism as a tradition. Yosef sought to bring this demographic closer to the Torah, while relying upon traditional Jewish sources for his rulings. For example, he ruled that those who desecrate the Sabbath are not to be considered as having abandoned the Torah, and therefore if they have touched wine, it remains kosher. This sort of ruling differs from Ashkenazi Haredi rulings. Yosef actively aims to engage in kiruv (Orthodox Judaism outreach), while still strictly adhering to halakha.

Yosef, however, had no sympathy towards Israeli Jews who profess a secular lifestyle. His opinion was to fully exclude them from the Jewish community. For Yosef, the secularist Israeli public are secular out of 'spitefulness' towards Torah, and he likened them to idolatrous apostates.

=== Israeli legal system ===
Yosef was opposed to bringing civil actions in the Israeli courts, because they decide outcomes by applying Israeli law, rather than halakha. His opposition is consistent with the position of the Ashkenazi Haredi rabbis, and some Religious Zionist rabbis (e.g., Yaakov Ariel) as well. On this matter, Yosef has written:

And know that even though the legal authority vested by the government to decide cases is with the secular courts and the judges there are Jews, with all this it is clear that according to the law of our holy Torah – he who sues his friend in their courts commits a sin too great to bear, and he is as was decided by the Rambam and Shulchan Aruch, that any who sues in their courts is evil and it is as though he has been spiteful and blasphemed and raised his hand against the Torah of Moses our Rabbi.

In matters of criminal law, however, Yosef is among the moderate rabbinic voices who support the application of the dina d'malkhuta dina rule (lit. 'the law of the land is the law'), and therefore, it is forbidden to engage in criminal conduct such as tax fraud. It is only in civil matters that he forbade going to the Israeli courts.

In February 1999, Yosef caused a controversy by strongly criticizing the Supreme Court of Israel:

These call themselves the Supreme Court? They're worthless. They should be put in a bottom court. They, for them [God] created all of the torments in the world. Everything that [the people of] Israel suffer from, is just for these evil people. Empty and reckless...What do they know? One of our children of 7–8 years knows better than they how to learn Torah. These are the people who have been put in the Supreme Court. Who chose them, who made them judges, but the Justice Minister, persecuter and enemy, he liked them, and he recommended that the President would appoint them as judges. What, were their elections? Who says that the nation wants such judges, such evil [ones]...They have no religion and no law. All of them have sex with niddot. All of them desecrate the Sabbath. These will be our judges? Slaves rule over us.

Following these statements, the Movement for Quality Government in Israel petitioned the Supreme Court of Israel, demanding that Yosef be put on trial. The Supreme Court dismissed the application, saying that the comments were within Yosef's right to freedom of speech. Nevertheless, then-Supreme Court President Aharon Barak wrote in his judgement:

The words of Rabbi Yosef are harsh. The content is hurtful. It harms the confidence of his followers in this court. Neither a gadol in the Torah nor a political leader [should] speak thus. This is not the message that a former dayan – who knows and understands the complexity of judicial work – needs to be sending to the community...

== Political activity ==
=== Government influence ===
In 1990, Yosef used his position as Shas spiritual leader to pressure Prime Minister Yitzhak Shamir into agreeing to hold negotiations with Arab states for a peaceful settlement of the Arab–Israeli conflict. Shamir, a member of the Likud Party, refused to make any commitments. According to the biography Ben Porat Yosef, the relationship between the two had never been comfortable because of Shamir's unstudious personality. As a way of gaining a character analysis of politicians, Yosef had invited both Shamir and Shimon Peres to learn Talmud with him. While Peres proved an engaging and fluid learner, Shamir was stoic toward the material, a trait that led Yosef to instead use one of Shamir's cabinet members, Housing and Construction Minister David Levy, as his key partner in dealing with the Likud. Levy had a relatively warm relationship with Yosef due to the former's moderate approach to Israel's security and foreign affairs policies, his charismatic personality, and his connection with Sephardi traditions. (Note: Levy, a Moroccan Jew, was the highest ranking Sephardi politician in the 1980s.)

In 1990, Yosef pulled Shas out of the coalition with Likud and attempted to form a partnership with Peres's left-centre Labor Party. The move, engineered but opposed by Shas chairman Aryeh Deri, backfired when Elazar Shach, the Ashkenazi dean of the Ponevezh Yeshiva in Bnei Brak (who subsequently founded the Degel HaTorah party) fiercely commanded Yosef to return Shas to the coalition with Likud. During this time, Yosef was severely criticised by other major members of the Haredi religious community in Israel, particular the Ashkenazi Jews who generally sided with Likud and the right rather than Labour and the left, who were widely seen as secular.

The failure of the scheme, known as the stinking trick, was responsible for Peres's downfall as leader of Labour and his 1991 defeat in internal elections to former Defense Minister Yitzhak Rabin. From the 1980s until his death, Yosef approved Shas's participation in most Israeli governments, except for the last two governments of Ariel Sharon from January 2003 and August 2005. Shas was one of the few parties to be in the opposition for the duration of that Knesset (2003–2006), along with the leftist Meretz party and the Arab factions Ra'am (United Arab List), Hadash, and Balad. This was largely because of the rise of Shinui to the powerful third-party position, a position previously held by Shas. Shinui demanded the creation of a government without Shas.

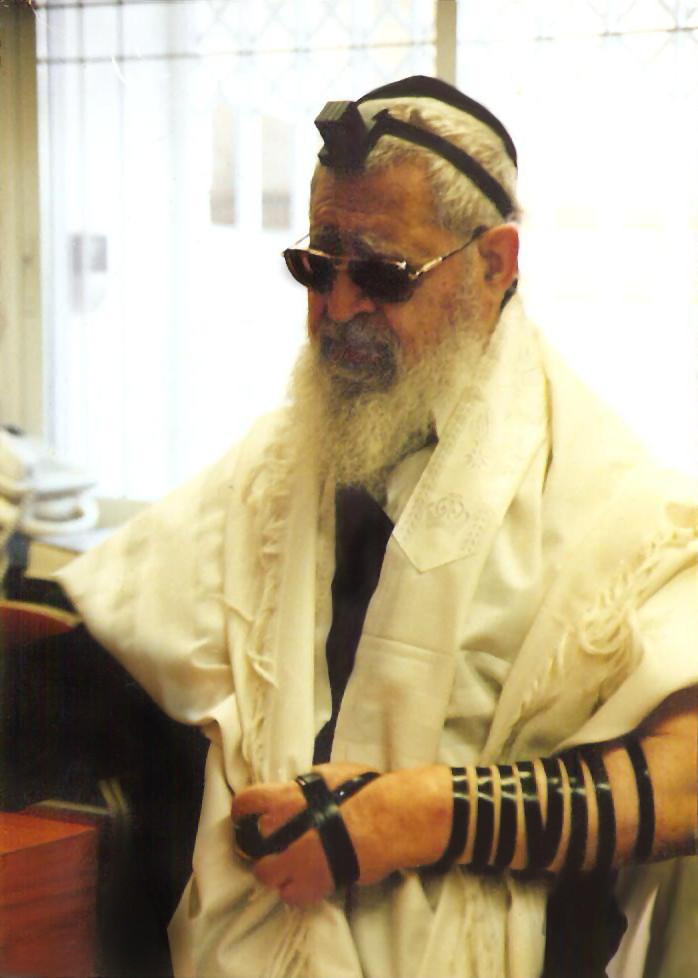
Yosef in 2007

In the 2007 Israeli presidential election, Yosef endorsed his longtime friend Shimon Peres, who won in part to the support of Shas's 12 MKs.

=== Cultural influence ===
In a 2004 article by Maariv, Yosef was listed as one of the most influential rabbis in Israel. He was described as:

The spiritual leader of Shas. The man most identified with the honorific title maran. He has considerable political strength, mainly because he controls the Knesset members of Shas...However, the key influence of Rabbi Yosef is in the arena of Judaism, specifically in halakha...In addition, he has great influence in teaching and endowing of his halakhic way. Jewish prayers according to Yosef's verdicts are the most common in Sephardic synagogues, and his halakhic books gained circulation beyond compare. Almost no one disputes the fact he is a Torah phenomenon, one of a kind. Despite this, he is a "field rabbi" and goes down to the common people with countless sermons.

=== Position on the Israeli–Palestinian conflict ===
Despite his controversial public comments, Yosef had long been a rabbinical authority advocating peace negotiations in the Israeli–Palestinian conflict, and had done so since the late 1980s. His main justification was the halakhic principle of pikuach nefesh, in which all the Jewish commandments (excluding adultery, idolatry, and murder) are put on hold if a life is put in danger. Using an argument first articulated by the American rabbinical leader Joseph Soloveitchik, Yosef claimed that the Arab–Israeli conflict endangers human lives, thereby meeting the above criteria and overruling the priority of commandments pertaining to settling the Land of Israel. Therefore, Israel is permitted—even obligated if saving lives is a definitive outcome—to make serious efforts to reach a peace settlement, as well as to make arrangements to properly protect its citizens. Yosef first applied the pikuach nefesh principle to Israel's conflicts with its neighbors in 1979, when he ruled that this argument granted Israel authority to return the Sinai Peninsula to Egypt. Some claimed, however, that the ruling was also motivated by Yosef's desire to oppose his Ashkenazi colleague, Shlomo Goren.

Using this precedent, Yosef instructed Shas to join Prime Minister Yitzhak Rabin's government coalition, and later that of Ehud Barak as well. However, Shas abstained on the Oslo I Accord and voted against the Oslo II Accord. Furthermore, as Oslo stalled, and relations between Israelis and Palestinians began to deteriorate, and particularly following the outbreak of the Al-Aqsa Intifada, Yosef and the party pulled "rightward", supporting the Likud.

In 2005, Yosef repeatedly condemned the Gaza Disengagement. He argued that he was opposed to any unilateral action that occurred outside the framework of a peace agreement. Yosef again cited the principle of pikuach nefesh, saying that empowering the Palestinians without a commitment to end terror would result in threatening Jewish lives, particularly in areas near Gaza in range of Qassam rocket attacks. In contrast to some of his rabbinical colleagues, such as Yosef Shalom Eliashiv, Yosef refused to entertain the idea of holding a referendum on the disengagement, and instructed his MKs to vote against the plan when it came up in the Knesset.

Yosef always maintained that pikuach nefesh applies to the Israeli–Palestinian conflict and supported negotiations with the Palestinians. However, toward the end of his life, he no longer appeared totally convinced that diplomacy with the Palestinian Authority leadership would necessarily end the violence. Some media analysts had suggested that then Prime Minister Ehud Olmert may have been able to convince Yosef to sign on to further unilateral actions by the government if concerted efforts toward negotiation failed.

Yosef protested strongly against demands by the United States and other foreign countries that Israel freeze construction in East Jerusalem, saying that, "It's as if we are their slaves". However, toward the end of his life, he indicated some flexibility on the issue, and may have taken a more pragmatic approach. In the wake of the diplomatic row between Israel and the US over Jewish housing in East Jerusalem, Yosef is reported to have said, in a private meeting with Shimon Peres, that "it is not permissible to challenge the nations of the world or the ruling powers", and that Israel should agree to a partial building freeze in East Jerusalem, at least temporarily.

== Controversial statements ==
Yosef made numerous political remarks that aroused controversy. His supporters said that statements deemed offensive to various groups and individuals were taken out of context, but the American Jewish Committee and the Anti-Defamation League condemned what they termed his "hate speech". He claimed the Holocaust was God's retribution against the reincarnated souls of Jewish sinners. He claimed that Israeli soldiers were killed in battle on account of their non-observance of Torah law. He was criticised for supporting the traditional role of women and minimising their capabilities. After Hurricane Katrina in 2005, he blamed the tragedy on U.S. support for the Gaza disengagement and on a general lack of Torah study in the area where the hurricane occurred. In 2009, he said of Yisrael Beiteinu and its leader, "whoever votes for Avigdor Lieberman gives strength to Satan".

=== Recommendations of the Plesner Committee ===
In 2013, Yosef called for yeshiva students to emigrate from Israel rather than agree to serve in the army, stating:

God forbid, we will be compelled to leave the Land of Israel...to free the yeshiva students [from being drafted].

In October 2013, immediately after Yosef's death, his son David Yosef told the Prime Minister that the drafting of Haredi students into the army had hurt him in his final months more than his physical illnesses.

=== Arabs and Palestinians ===
In 2001, Yosef was quoted as saying:

It is forbidden to be merciful to them. You must send missiles to them and annihilate them. They are evil and damnable.

Yosef later said that his sermon was misquoted, that he was referring to annihilation of Islamic terrorism, not all Arabs. He called for improving the living conditions of the Arab people in Israel and said he had deep respect for peace-seeking Arabs.

Israeli Justice Minister Meir Sheetrit condemned the sermon, saying: "A person of Rabbi Ovadia Yosef's stature must refrain from acrid remarks such as these... I suggest that we not learn from the ways of the Palestinians and speak in verbal blows like these."

Yosef drew criticism from the US State Department in August 2010 following a Saturday morning sermon in which he called for

all the nasty people who hate Israel, like Abu Mazen (Abbas), vanish from our world... May God strike them down with the plague along with all the nasty Palestinians who persecute Israel.

Saeb Erekat, the chief Palestinian negotiator, said Yosef's statements were tantamount to a call for genocide against Palestinians and demanded a firm response from the Israeli government. Israeli Prime Minister Benjamin Netanyahu distanced himself and his government from the sermon, saying that Yosef's words "do not reflect my approach, or the stand of the Israeli government".

Yosef said he regretted his statements, and was said to have looked for a way to sending the Palestinians a conciliatory message. Three weeks later, he sent out a conciliatory message reiterating his old positions in support of the peace process. He wished the Palestinians and their leaders "who are partners to this important process, and want its success, long days and years". He continued, "The People of Israel are taught to seek peace, and three times daily pray for it. We wish for a sustainable peace with all our neighbors" and blessed "all the leaders and peoples, Egyptians, Jordanians, and Palestinians, who are partners to this important process and want its success, a process that will bring peace to our region and prevent bloodshed".

=== Remarks about gentiles ===
In an October 2010 sermon, Yosef said, "the sole purpose of non-Jews is to serve Jews". He also said:

Goyim were born only to serve us. Without that, they have no place in the world — only to serve the People of Israel.

In Israel, death has no dominion over them... With gentiles, it will be like any person — they need to die, but [God] will give them longevity. Why? Imagine that one's donkey would die, they'd lose their money. This is his servant... That's why he gets a long life, to work well for this Jew.

Why are gentiles needed? They will work, they will plow, they will reap. We will sit like an effendi and eat. That is why gentiles were created.

== Published works ==
Among Yosef's earliest work was a detailed commentary on Ben Ish Hai (book) titled Halikhot Olam. He was asked to finish the commentary Kaf Ha'Chaim by Yaakov Chaim Sofer after the author's death. Two sets of Yosef's responsa have been published, Yabia Omer and Yechaveh Da'at. (Note: Both titles are references to Psalm 19.) His responsa are noted for citing almost every source regarding a specific topic and are often referred to simply as indices of rulings. There is also another series of books under the title of Hazon Ovadia, (Note: Not to be confused with the original work of this title, which is a responsa on Passover.) which he has written concerning laws of Shabbat, holidays, and other topics.

Yosef printed a commentary on the Mishnah tractate Pirkei Avot (Ethics of the Fathers) under the title Anaf Etz Avot, and Maor Israel, a commentary on various parts of the Talmud. His son Yitzhak Yosef has published a widely read codification of Yosef's rulings, Yalkut Yosef. Another son, David Yosef, has printed various siddurim and liturgy according to his father's rulings, and another halakhic compendium, Halacha Berurah.

In 1970, Yosef was awarded the Israel Prize for Rabbinical literature.

== See also ==
- Isaac Sacca

Preceded by Yitzhak Nissim	Sephardi Chief Rabbi of Israel; Ovadia Yosef; 1973–1983	Succeeded by Mordechai Eliyahu

== Notes ==
Jewish titles
Preceded by Yitzhak Nissim	Sephardi Chief Rabbi of Israel; 1973–1983	Succeeded by Mordechai Eliyahu
