= Yalkut Yosef =

Yalkut Yosef (Hebrew: ילקוט יוסף, "Collation of Yosef") is an authoritative, contemporary work of Halakha, providing a detailed explanation of the Shulchan Aruch as based on the halachic rulings of the former Rishon LeZion Rabbi Ovadia Yosef. It was written by his son Rabbi Yitzhak Yosef, who also served as the Rishon LeZion.

Yalkut Yosef is written to give practical halachic guidance to Jews of Sephardi and Mizrahi origin; it is widely cited, and a growing number of synagogues and yeshivot are using the work for study purposes.

The work is published in 32 volumes and includes a 2 volume "kitzur" (summary). It currently covers almost all of the Orach Chayim section of the Shulchan Aruch, and parts of Yoreh De'ah dealing with Kashrut.

A new English edition, "The Saka Edition-Yalkut Yosef", is currently being published under the leadership of Rabbi Yisrael Bitan of Haketer Institute of Jerusalem. As of September 2018, 30 volumes have been published and additional volumes are under preparation. Haketer Institute plans on publishing 33 volumes which will cover all areas of Sephardi Halacha observance.

== See also ==
- Ben Ish Chai, by Rabbi Yosef Hayyim, a Sephardi work of Halakha incorporating Kabbalistic teachings.
- Kaf HaChaim - a discursive Sephardi work of Halakha by Rabbi Yaakov Chaim Sofer.

== References and External links ==
Notes

Links

- Yalkut Yosef Kitzur Shulchan Aruch online (in Hebrew)
- http://www.yalkutyosef.co.il/ (in Hebrew)
- Kitzur Shulchan Aruch Yalkut Yosef set online for Android (in Hebrew)
