= Adina Bar-Shalom =

Israeli educator, columnist and social activist

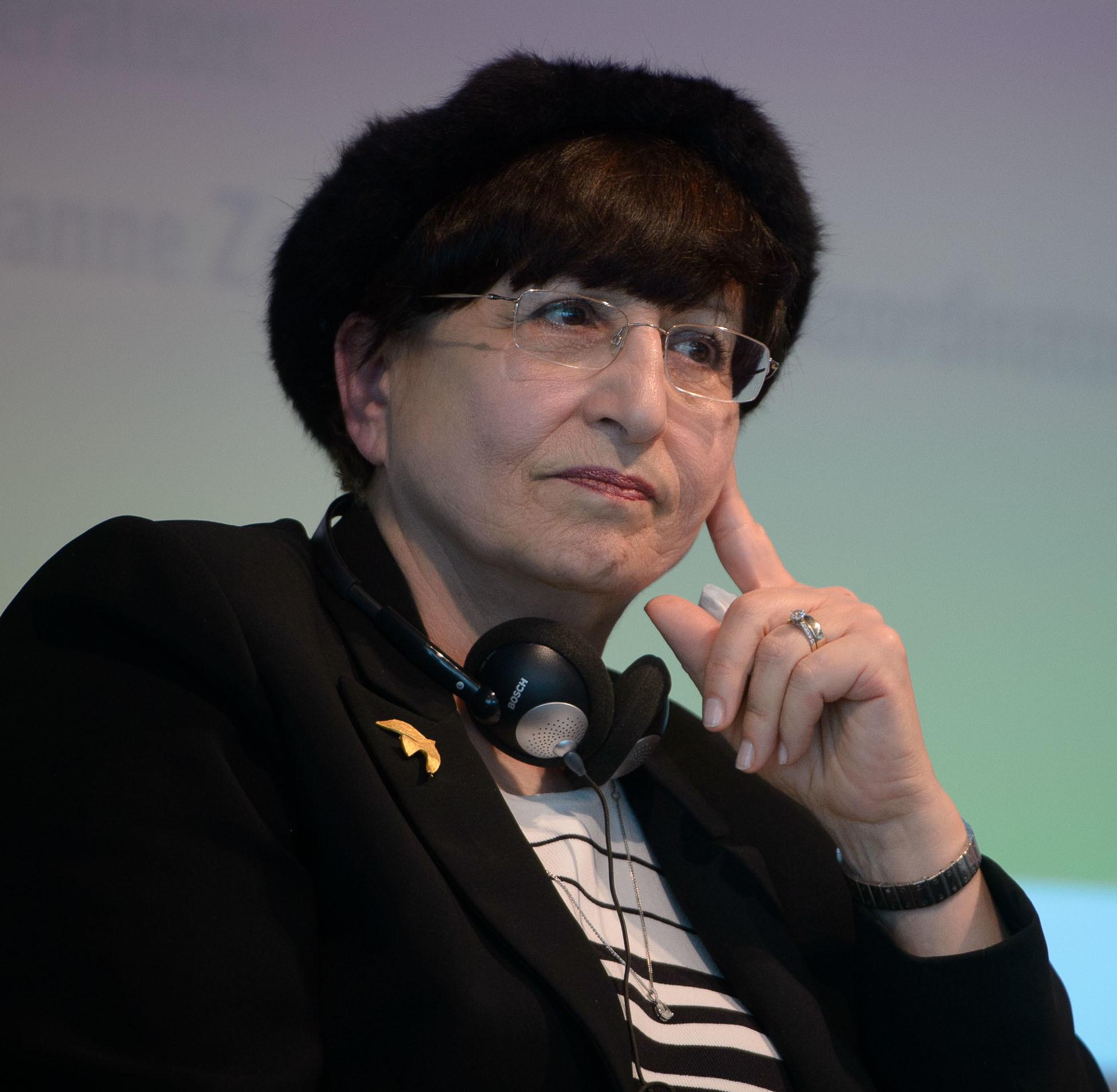

Personal life
- Born: Adina Yosef; January 5, 1945 (age 81) Jerusalem
- Spouse: Ezra Bar-Shalom
- Children: 3
- Parent(s): Rabbi Ovadia Yosef and Margalit Fattal
- Education: Shenkar College of Engineering and Design
- Occupation: Educator and social activist

Religious life
- Religion: Judaism
- Denomination: Sephardi Haredi Judaism

Jewish leader
- Residence: Jerusalem

Adina Bar-Shalom (Hebrew: עדינה בר-שלום; January 5, 1945) is an Israeli educator, columnist, and social activist. She was the founder of the first college for Haredi students in Jerusalem, and has spent years working to overcome gender discrimination in the Orthodox Jewish community. She was awarded the Israel Prize for lifetime achievement and special contribution to society in 2014. A daughter of Ovadia Yosef, she is a member of the prominent Yosef family.

== Biography ==
Adina Yosef (Bar-Shalom) was born in Jerusalem, the eldest daughter of Rabbi Ovadia Yosef and Margalit Fattal. From age 3 to 6, she lived in Cairo, Egypt, where her father served as deputy chief rabbi. She is a graduate of the Bais Yaakov girls' school network. As a teenager, she studied tailoring at a Bais Yaakov professional institution.

At eighteen, she married Rabbi Ezra Bar-Shalom, then taught sewing, and opened a fellowship for young brides for several years. In 1975, she began to study fashion design at the Shenkar College of Engineering and Design, after her husband and her father had opposed her plans to study psychology at a university.

In 2001, with the permission of her father, Bar-Shalom founded Haredi College of Jerusalem, the first higher education institution in that city designed for the Haredi sector. The college's programming and degrees are provided by Israeli academic institutions such as Ben-Gurion University of the Negev, Bar-Ilan University and others, but the study takes place in a strictly gender-segregated environment, with schedules and childcare arrangements to enable students to uphold traditional Haredi expectations of Torah study for men and motherhood for women.

Bar-Shalom resides in the Ramat Aviv neighborhood of Tel Aviv with her husband, who is a rabbinical court judge and formerly served as president of the Tel Aviv Beit Din. The couple has three children. Their daughter, Chana, who was the director of former MK Shlomo Benizri's office, is married to lawyer Moshe Shimoni, director general of the farmers' union and former director general of the Ministry of Religious Services.

== Political and social activism ==
Bar-Shalom became involved in politics as a member of the Tafnit social protest group, led by Uzi Dayan, but left when the movement evolved into a political party and ran in the 2006 Knesset elections (though it failed to cross the threshold). She then founded a forum for dialogue between religious and secular Jews in Israel. In the summer of 2011, she worked on the Spivak-Yona committee to address social inequality.

In 2012, Bar-Shalom took part in a widely publicised meeting with Mahmoud Abbas, the President of the Palestinian Authority.

Bar-Shalom regularly speaks about the importance of women's education and work, and in 2013 supported a women's-only political party in the Haredi town of El'ad. In addition, in early 2014, she considered a bid to become the president of Israel. In March 2014, Bar-Shalom wrote that the Haredi feminist revolution is already here, writing that, "The train has left the station".

Bar-Shalom supported Shas, the political party founded by her father, and in 2014 founded and led its women's committee. However, in 2018, she broke with Shas and founded a new party, Ahi Yisraeli, to run in the 2019 Israeli elections. Ahi Yisraeli pulled out before the election, and Bar-Shalom endorsed Moshe Kahlon's Kulanu party.

== Awards and recognition ==
In December 2012, she was honored as a "Knight of Quality Government" by the Movement for Quality Government in Israel. In 2013, Bar-Shalom was selected by Nashim magazine, part of the Makor Rishon newspaper, as one of the twenty most influential religious women in Israel. In April 2013, she received an honorary doctorate from Ben-Gurion University of the Negev.

In 2014 Bar-Shalom was honored as one of the torchbearers in the national Israeli Independence Day ceremony.
