= Beit Yosef =

Beit Yosef may refer to:

- Beit Yosef, Israel, a moshav in the Beit She'an Valley
- Beit Yosef (book), a book by Rabbi Joseph Caro
- Badatz Beit Yosef, a kosher certification that follows guidelines of Rabbi Yosef Caro
- Yeshiva Beit Yosef, after Rabbi Yosef Yozel Horowitz, was the name of 30+ Novardok Yeshiva satellites in Poland
