= Ariel Atias =

Israeli politician (born 1970)

- אריאל אטיאס
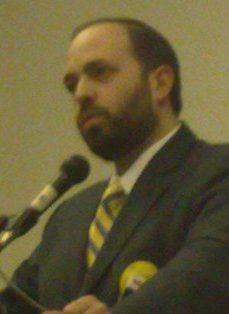

Ministerial roles
- 2006–2009: Minister of Communications
- 2009–2013: Minister of Housing & Construction

Faction represented in the Knesset
- 2006–2014: Shas

Personal details
- Born: 13 November 1970 (age 55) Tel Aviv, Israel

Ariel Atias (Hebrew: אריאל אטיאס; born 13 November 1970) is an Israeli politician who served as a member of the Knesset for Shas, and as the country's Minister of Housing and Construction. He was also manager of Shas' kosher supervision organization, Badatz Beit Yosef. On 22 June 2014, he handed his resignation from the Parliament, citing his departure from the political scene.

== Early life ==
Born in Tel Aviv to parents who were Jewish immigrants from Morocco.

== Career ==
Atias was first elected to the Knesset on Shas' list in the 2006 elections. In May 2006, he was promoted to the position of Minister of Communications in the last government.

He retained his seat in the 2009 elections, having been placed second on the Shas list, and was appointed Minister of Housing and Construction in the Netanyahu government. In June 2009, Atias called for the segregation of Israel's Arab population from Jewish Israelis, saying that achieving it was "a national duty ... populations that should not mix are spreading ... I don't think that it is appropriate [for them] to live together".

Atias retained his seat again in the 2013 Knesset elections, but Shas was not included in the coalition, resulting in Atias losing his ministerial post. He resigned from the Knesset in June 2014 in order to take a break from politics, and was replaced by Yoav Ben-Tzur.

=== Minister of Communications ===
As the Minister of Communications, Atias created a major cellular reform in Israel, which led to Israel's connectivity fees being one of the lowest in the OECD. He also created the number portability reform in which a user is given the rights to his cellular number, thus allowing users more freedom to move from one company to another, encouraging competition between cellular companies Another one of his initiatives as Minister of Communications was opening the market for Mobile virtual network operators.

In 2007, he tried to get a law passed that would censor violence, sex, and gambling on the internet.

== Personal life ==
Atias is married, has four children, and lives in Jerusalem.
