= Yitzhak Nissim =

2nd Sephardic Chief Rabbi of Israel

Rabbi Yitzhak Nissim
- יצחק ניסים
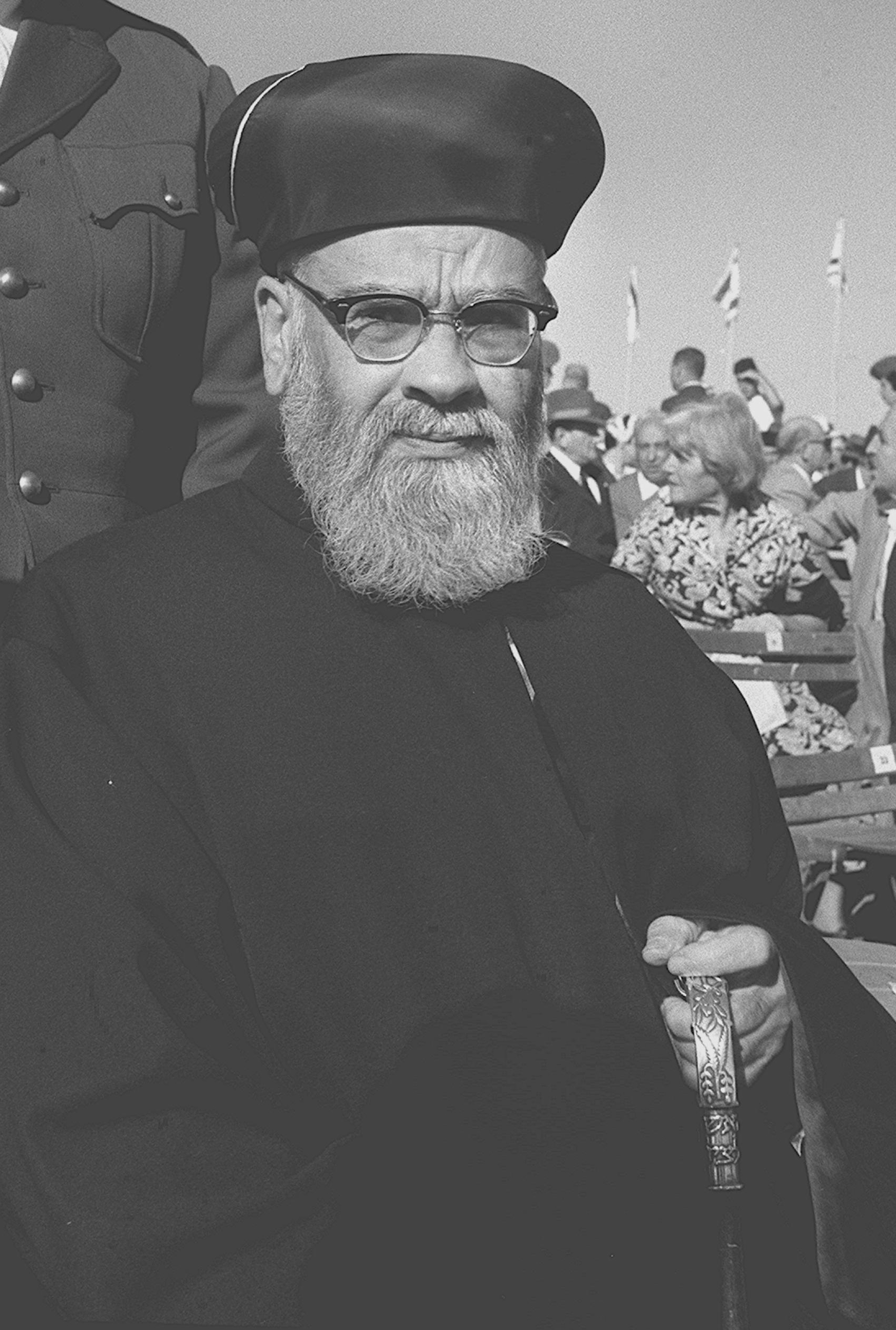
- Title: Sephardic chief rabbi of Israel

Personal life
- Born: 1896 Baghdad, Ottoman Iraq
- Died: 1981 (aged 84–85)
- Parent: Rabbi

Religious life
- Religion: Judaism
- Denomination: Orthodox

Jewish leader
- Predecessor: Benzion Uziel
- Successor: Ovadia Yosef
- Began: 1955
- Ended: 1972

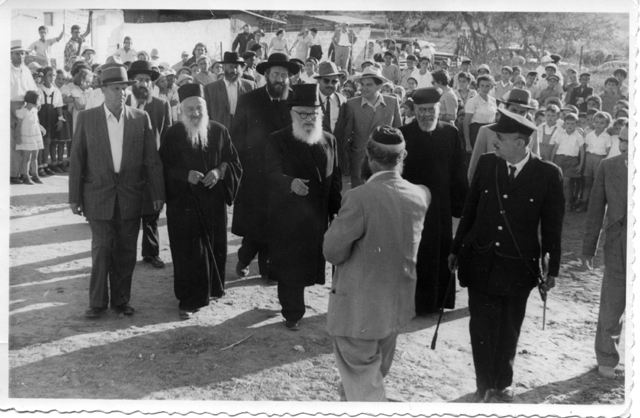
A visit to Ashkelon by Rishon Lezion Rabbi Yitzhak Nissim and Ashkenazi Chief Rabbi Isaac Herzog (1955)

Yitzhak Nissim (Hebrew: יצחק נסים; 1896 – August 9, 1981) was a Sephardic chief rabbi of Israel. Nissim was born in Baghdad and immigrated to Israel in 1925. He studied under Rabbi Sadqa Hussein.

In 1955, he became Chief Sephardic Rabbi. As a gesture of goodwill, he visited some kibbutzim, which at that time were predominantly Ashkenazi and secular. He was also emphatic that the Bene Israel, who had been rejected as Jews by other rabbis, were Jewish.

In 1964, Pope Paul VI visited Israel but refused to visit the heads of other religions, insisting that they come visit him. In protest, Nissim boycotted this visit, insisting that he was willing to visit the Pope as long as there would be reciprocity if a chief rabbi came to the Vatican.

He was the father of Moshe Nissim and Meir Benayahu.

Religious titles
Preceded by Benzion Uziel	Sephardi Chief Rabbi of Israel; Yitzhak Nissim; 1955–1972	Succeeded by Ovadia Yosef
