= Yosef Hayyim =

Kabbalist & Iraqi rabbi (1835–1909)

- יוסף חיים מבגדאד
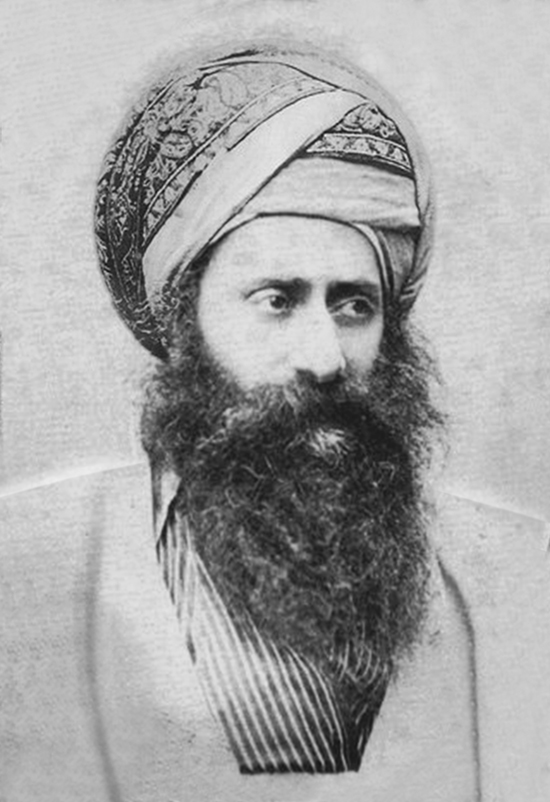
- Born: 1 September 1835
- Died: 30 August 1909 (aged 73)

Yosef Hayim (1 September 1835 – 30 August 1909) (Iraqi Hebrew: Yoseph Ḥayyim; Hebrew: יוסף חיים מבגדאד; or Yosef Chaim) was a leading Baghdadi hakham (Sephardi rabbi), authority on halakha (Jewish law), and Master Kabbalist. He is best known as author of the work on halakha Ben Ish Ḥai (בן איש חי) ("Son of Man (who) Lives"), a collection of the laws of everyday life interspersed with mystical insights and customs, addressed to the masses and arranged by the weekly Torah portion.

== Biography ==
Hayim initially studied in his father's library, and, at the age of 10, he left the beth midrash and began to study with his uncle, David Hai Ben Meir, who later founded the Shoshanim LeDavid yeshiva in Jerusalem. In 1851, he married Rachel, the niece of Abdallah Somekh, his prime mentor, with whom he had a daughter and two sons.

When Hayim was only twenty-five years old, his father died. Despite his youth, the Jews of Baghdad accepted him to fill his father's place as the leading rabbinic scholar of Baghdad, though he never filled the official position of Hakham Bashi. The Sephardic Porat Yosef Yeshiva in Jerusalem was founded on his advice by Joseph Shalom, of Calcutta, India—one of Hayim's patrons.

Hayim clashed with the reformist Bavarian Jewish scholar Jacob Obermeyer, who lived in Baghdad from 1869 to 1880, and Hayyim excommunicated him. Part of the contention was due to Obermeyer and Hayim's conflicting views on promotion of the Zohar.

== Works ==
The Ben Ish Hai (בן איש חי) is a standard reference in some Sephardi homes (functioning as "a Sephardi Kitzur Shulchan Aruch") and is widely studied in Sephardi yeshivot. Due to the popularity of this book, Hakham Yosef Hayim came to be known as Ben Ish Hai. The book is a collection of homilies he gave over two years discussing the weekly parsha or Torah portion. Each chapter begins with a mystical discussion, usually explaining how a Kabbalistic interpretation of a certain verse relates to particular halakha, and then continuing to expound on that halakha with definitive rulings.

Hakham Yosef Hayim authored over thirty other works, and there are many published Iraqi rite siddurim (prayer books) based on his rulings, which are widely used by Sephardi Jews. Amongst the best known of his works are:

- Me-Kabtziel (Miqqabṣiʾel): an esoteric exposition of Jewish law providing a more detailed explanation of the reasoning underlying certain decisions. It has been speculated that Yosef Hayim's insistence on having all his works printed in the Jerusalem Sanjak prevented this essential work from being published.
- Ben Yehoyada (Ben Yəhoyadaʻ) and Benayahou: his commentary on the Talmud, considered a basic resource in understanding the Aggada (narrative sections of the Talmud).
- The responsum (Hebrew: She'elot U-Teshuvot) Rav Pe'alim (Rab Pəʻalim) and Torah Lishmah.
- Sefer Ben Ish Ḥai (Halakhot) (in Hebrew). Jerusalem: Merkaz ha-sefer. 1986. OCLC 492903129. (reprinted in 1994)

The names Ben Ish Hai, Me-Kabtziel, Rav Pe'alim and Ben Yehoyada derive from 2 Samuel 23:20. He chose these names because he claimed to have been a reincarnation of Benayahu ben Yehoyada, described as Ben Ish Hayil "son of a valiant man"; the man in whose merit, it is said, both the first and second Temple in Jerusalem stood.

Yosef Hayim was also noted for his stories and parables. Some are scattered through his halakhic works, but have since been collected and published separately; others were published as separate works in his lifetime, as an alternative to the European-inspired secular literature that was becoming popular at the time. His Qânûn-un-Nisâ (قانون النساء) is a book filled with parables concerning self-improvement. The book, directed towards, but not limited to women, is rare since it was composed in Baghdad Jewish Arabic. It was last published in Israel in the 1940s.

A wide ranging authority in Jewish law, some of his most important ruling on Jewish law focused on the role of women in Judaism.

== See also ==
- Jonatan Meir, "Toward the Popularization of Kabbalah: R. Yosef Hayyim of Baghdad and the Kabbalists of Jerusalem", Modern Judaism 33(2) (May 2013), pp. 147–172
- Kaf HaChaim — a more discursive, and contemporaneous, Sephardi work of Halakha by Rabbi Yaakov Chaim Sofer.
- Yalkut Yosef, a contemporary Sephardi work of Halakha, based on the rulings of Rabbi Ovadia Yosef.
- Yehuda Fatiyah — a student of Yosef Chaim.
- Ben Ish Hai," – The Life & Times of Hacham Yosef Haim by Yehuda Azoulay
