= Lior Edri =

Israeli rabbi and politician

- ליאור אדרי

Faction represented in the Knesset
- 2015: Shas

Personal details
- Born: 13 February 1979 (age 46); Netanya, Israel

Rabbi Lior Edri (Hebrew: ליאור אדרי; born 13 February 1979) is an Israeli rabbi and politician. He briefly served as a member of the Knesset for Shas in 2015.

== Biography ==
Edri studied in two yeshivas and a kolel in Netanya. He went on to become a manager at Badatz Beit Yosef, supervising meat kashrut.

A member of Shas, he was placed thirteenth on the party's list for the 2013 Knesset elections. Although Shas won only 11 seats, Edri entered the Knesset on 1 January 2015 following the resignation of Aryeh Deri. He was not on the party's list for the March 2015 elections, losing his seat.
