= Moshe Yosef (rabbi) =

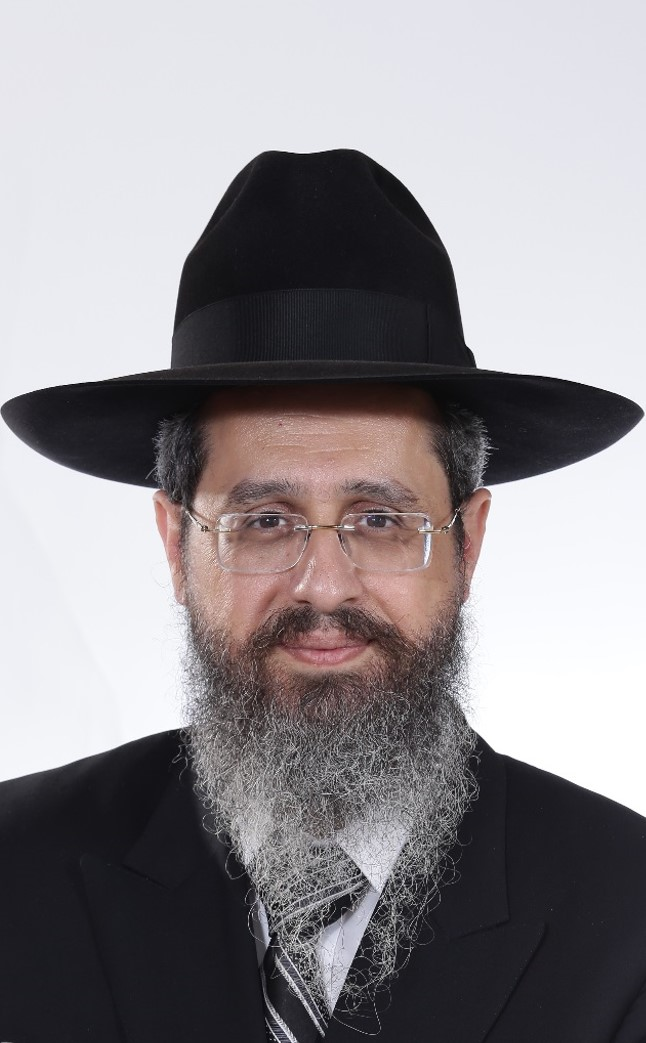
Moshe Yosef

Moshe Yosef (Hebrew: משה יוסף; born 1966), a leading rabbi in Shas, is the head of one of the largest kosher organizations in Israel, Badatz Beit Yosef, and the head of the Maor Yisrael, which publishes the works of his father, Rabbi Ovadia Yosef, former Chief Rabbi of Israel. Moshe Yosef is the sole inheritor of his father's writings, and has ownership of "published works as well as ownership of the large archive of handwritten works and his personal library". He lives in Har Nof.
