= Ya'akov Yosef =

Rabbi and Israeli politician

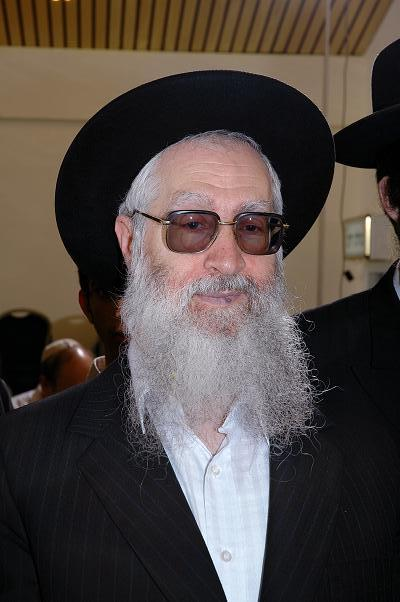
- Yosef in June 2008

Faction represented in the Knesset
- 1984–1988: Shas

Personal details
- Born: 18 October 1946 Jerusalem, Mandatory Palestine
- Died: 12 April 2013 (Aged 66) Jerusalem

Ya'akov Yosef (Hebrew: יעקב יוסף; 18 October 1946 – 12 April 2013) was an Israeli rabbi and politician who served as a member of the Knesset for Shas between 1984 and 1988.

== Early life ==
Ya'akov Yosef (Jacob Joseph) was born in Jerusalem towards the end of the Mandate era, the second child (oldest son) of Ovadia Yosef, a prominent rabbi. He was educated in the Porat Yosef and Kol Torah yeshivas in Bayit VeGan. He was later certified as a rabbi at the Rav Kook Institute.

== Political career ==
In the early 1980s, Yosef became a member of the new Shas party founded by his father, and represented it on Jerusalem city council between 1983 and 1984. In 1984, he was elected to the Knesset on the Shas list, and sat on the Constitution, Law and Justice Committee, the Education and Culture Committee and the Parliamentary Inquiry Committee for Traffic Accidents, until he was removed from the Shas electoral list for the 1988 elections, at his father's behest. He later dissented from his father's political positions, especially as relates to peace negotiations with Palestinians.

In 2008, he said that Shas had "lost its moral right to exist" because of its participation in governments that engaged in these negotiations. Yosef was detained by police under suspicion of incitement to violence and racism, after he wrote an approbation for a book that justifies the killing of non-Jews.

His son, Yonatan Yosef, a prominent Jerusalem rabbi, is the spokesman for Jewish Settlers in Sheikh Jarrah, and a prominent activists for the Judaization of East Jerusalem. In 2013, Yonatan ran for Jerusalem City Council.

== Rabbinic career ==
He was the head of the Hazon Ya'akov yeshiva (which is named after his grandfather), and the rabbi for the Givat Moshe neighbourhood in Jerusalem. His brother, Avraham, was the chief rabbi of Holon.

In 2004, his father overruled one of Yosef's Halakhic rulings, which forbade soldiers from eating food provided by the army, condemning it as "inciteful."

== Controversy ==
On 3 July 2011, Yosef was arrested on suspicion of incitement to racism for his endorsement of the book The King's Torah, after he failed to report to the police for questioning, and released shortly thereafter. The arrest and questioning sparked protests among his supporters.

In November 2012, during Operation Pillar of Defense, Yosef said in a sermon in Hebron, West Bank: "The IDF [Israeli Defence Forces] must learn from the Syrians how to slaughter and crush the enemy."

== Illness and death ==
On 12 April 2013, at the age of 66, Yosef died in Jerusalem's Hadassah Ein Kerem hospital around a year after being diagnosed with cancer. He was buried in the Har Hamenuchot cemetery.
