= Yonatan Yosef =

Israeli rabbi

- יונתן יוסף

Jerusalem City Council member
- Incumbent
- Assumed office 2018

Personal details
- Party: Meuchadim (2018), Yachad (2019)
- Profession: Rabbi, right-wing activist

Yonatan Yosef (Hebrew: יונתן יוסף) is a Jerusalem rabbi, a former spokesman for Jewish settlers in Sheikh Jarrah, and right-wing activist for the Judaization of East Jerusalem. He has been a member of Jerusalem city council since 2018.

== Life and career ==
In 2013, Yosef ran for Jerusalem City Council. In 2018, he was elected to the city council, being in the second place in "Meuchadim" list headed by Aryeh King, which won two of the 31 seats in the counsil. In the 2019 general elections, he was placed 3 in list of Yachad party headed by Eli Yishai, but the party withdrew few days before the election.

Yosef obtained ownership of a house in part of Sheikh Jarrah in which a Jewish neighborhood existed prior to the 1948 war, and that the Jordanian authorities rented to a family of Palestinian refugees. In 2021 he demanded the eviction of the family, and personally delivered them the eviction notice.

In reference to Sheikh Jarrah, in the 2012 short film My Neighbourhood, Yosef stated that: "The Bible says that this area and this country belong to the Jewish people." "We take house after house because we prove in the court that this area belonged to the Jewish. And because that, all this area will be a Jewish neighbourhood. Our dream is that all East Jerusalem will be like West Jerusalem, Jewish capital of Israel."

He is the son of Rabbi Ya'akov Yosef and the grandson of Rabbi Ovadia Yosef, the former Sephardi chief rabbi of Israel.
