= David Yosef =

Sephardi Chief Rabbi of Israel (born 1957)

Hacham David Yosef דוד יוסף
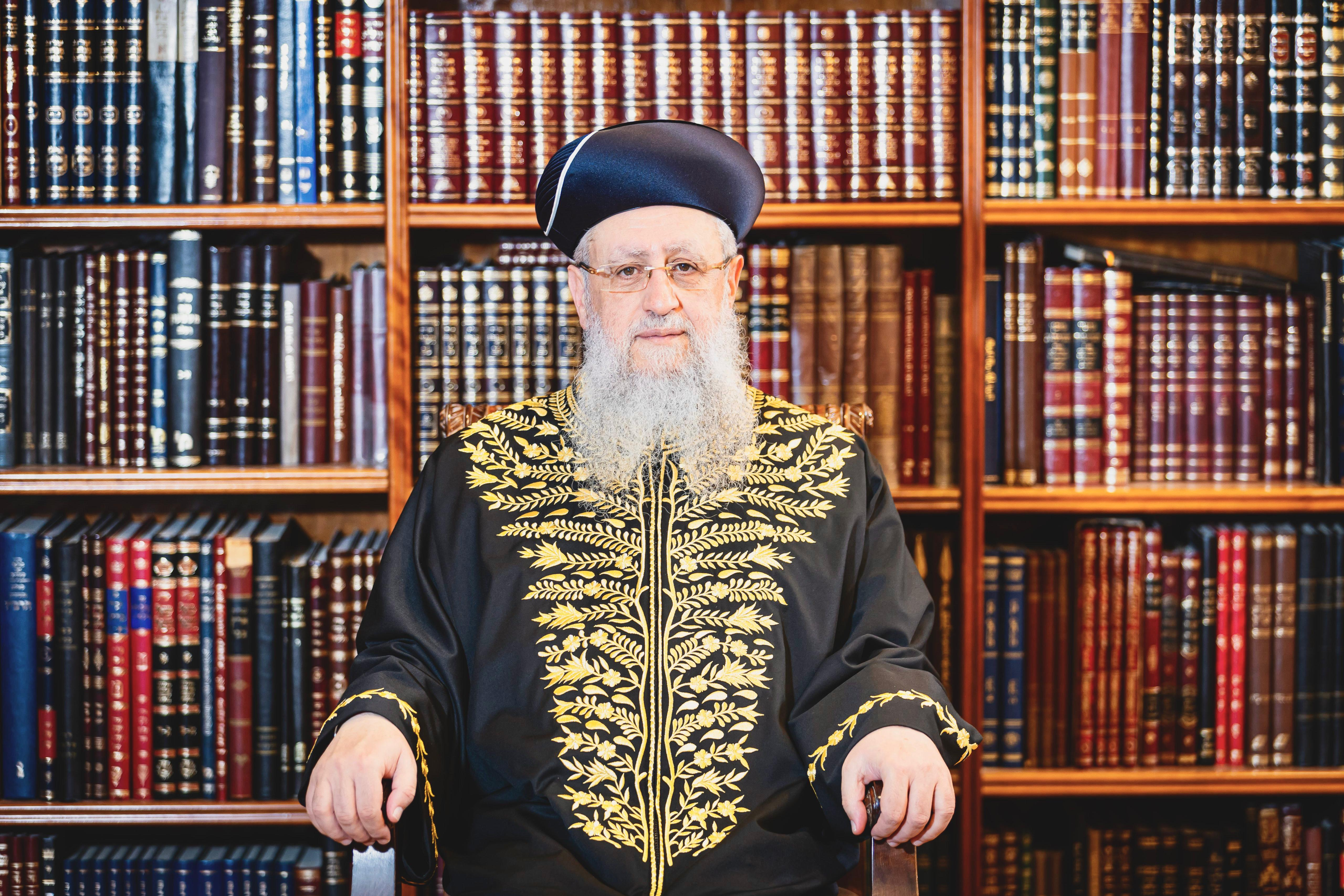
- Yosef in 2024
- Title: Rishon LeZion; Chief Rabbi of Israel

Personal life
- Born: August 10, 1957 (age 69) Jerusalem, Israel
- Spouse: Sofia Yosef
- Parents: Ovadia Yosef (father); Margalit Yosef (mother)
- Education: Hebron Yeshiva (Knesset Yisrael), Ponevezh Yeshiva

Religious life
- Religion: Judaism
- Denomination: Sephardic Orthodox

Jewish leader
- Predecessor: Yitzchak Yosef
- Position: Sephardi Chief Rabbi of Israel (2024 – present)
- Organisation: Chief Rabbinate of Israel
- Main work: The "Halacha Berura" and others
- Other: Chief Rabbi of Har Nof, Rosh Kollel of Yechaveh Da'at

Hacham David Yosef (Hebrew: דוד יוסף; born August 10, 1957) is the Sephardi Chief Rabbi of Israel and Rishon LeZion. He has authored dozens of books in Jewish Law mainly based on the rulings of his father, Hacham Ovadia Yosef. His most notable work is a set of books named Halacha Berura, which is an encyclopedia like commentary on the Shulchan Aruch, with letters of approbation from his father and Rabbi Yosef Shalom Elyashiv.

On September 29, 2024, Yosef was elected to serve a ten-year term as the Sephardic Chief Rabbi of Israel, The Rishon LeZion. Both his older brother Yitzchak Yosef and his father Ovadia Yosef previously served in the office. Yosef was formally inaugurated in a crowning ceremony on December 11, 2024 in Jerusalem, where he officially donned the traditional garments of the Sephardic Chief Rabbi. Yosef honored the legacy of his father by wearing his fathers vestments during the ceremony. Yosef's personal vestments will resemble the design of his father's. Yosef currently serves as the president of the Chief Rabbinate Council, and will rotate with his Ashkenazi counterpart, to later serve as Head of the Rabbinic Court.

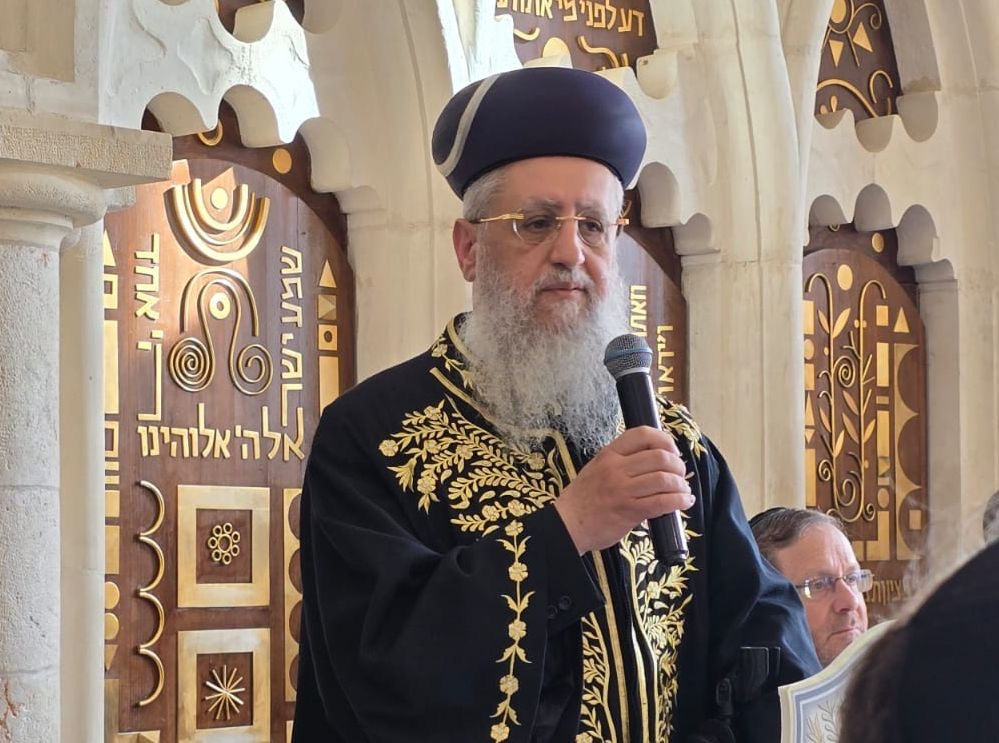
Rabbi David Yosef wearing his father's Glima and Mitznefet at his inauguration ceremony

He previously served as the chief rabbi of the Har Nof neighborhood in Jerusalem, the head of the Yechaveh Da'at Kollel, and a member of the Moetzet Chachmei HaTorah of the Shas party.

== Early life and education ==
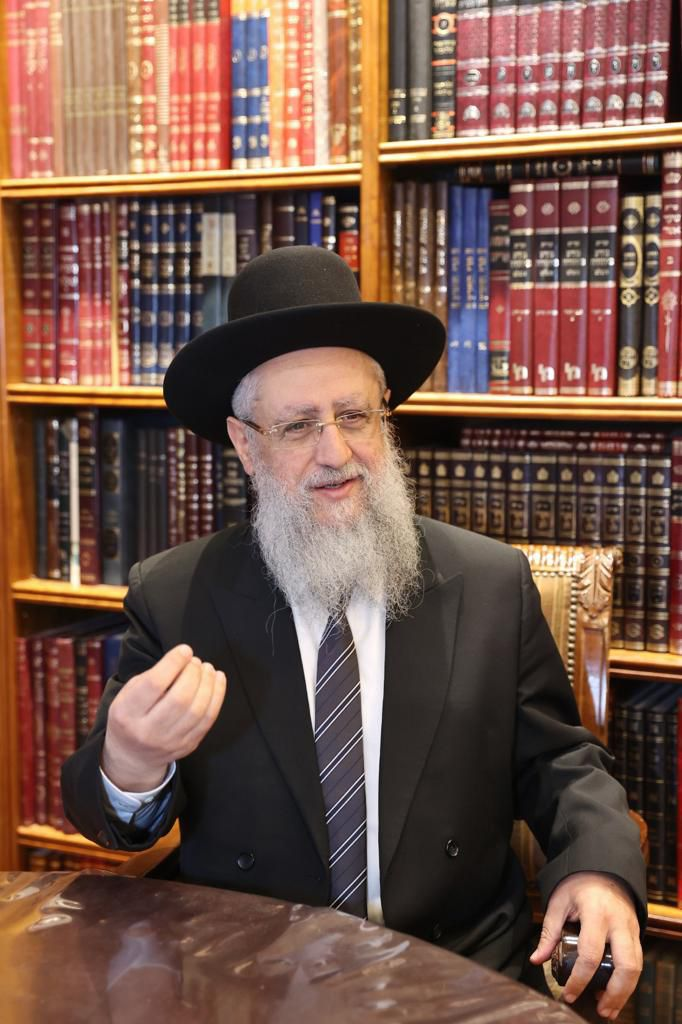
Yosef

Yosef was born and raised in Jerusalem. He is the ninth child of the former Israeli Chief Rabbi and Shas political party spiritual leader Ovadia Yosef, and is paternally of Iraqi Jewish descent and maternally of Syrian Jewish descent. Yosef studied at the Or Israel Yeshiva in his youth, at the Ponevezh Yeshiva and then at the Hebron Yeshiva in Jerusalem.

== Personal life ==
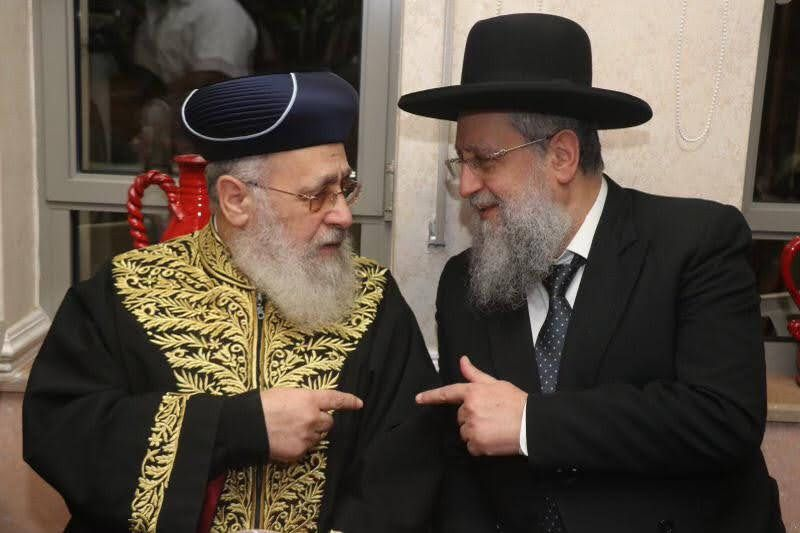
Rabbi David Yosef and his brother Rabbi Yitzchak Yosef

Yosef is married to Sofia, sister of former MK Eli Suissa. They have nine children. Yosef lives in the Har Nof neighborhood of Jerusalem.

== Controversies ==
In October 2020, Yosef was forced to resign as a state-paid rabbi due to violating regulations for public servants, which prohibit public servants from expressing political opinions in public, and also prohibit offensive or discriminatory speech against groups. Violations include speaking negatively about the Reform movement and the Women of the Wall prayer rights organization including statements such as: "One must stand up in every place and talk about the lie of the Reform movement which has distorted authentic Judaism". He has spoken disparagingly about the Women of the Wall, saying: "these idiots put on tefillin," that their activity was "promiscuous, coarse, vulgar, immodest and shameless," and that "they have no connection to authentic Judaism." In August 2026, Yosef again stirred controversy during an event at the Gush Katif Museum during which he stated “They claim to be the Palestinian people, but they are not a people. They never were a people, and they have no rights” and that “Gaza is the Land of Israel, Gaza is ours, Nablus is ours, Jenin is ours, all of them are ours” and that Israel should return once the “the Holy One” has destroyed Gaza

Jewish titles
Preceded by Yitzchak Yosef	Sephardi Chief Rabbi of Israel; 2024–Present	Succeeded by
