= Ben-Zion Meir Hai Uziel =

Chief rabbi of Mandatory Palestine and the State of Israel

Rabbi Ben-Zion Meir Hai Uziel בן ציון מאיר חי עוזאל
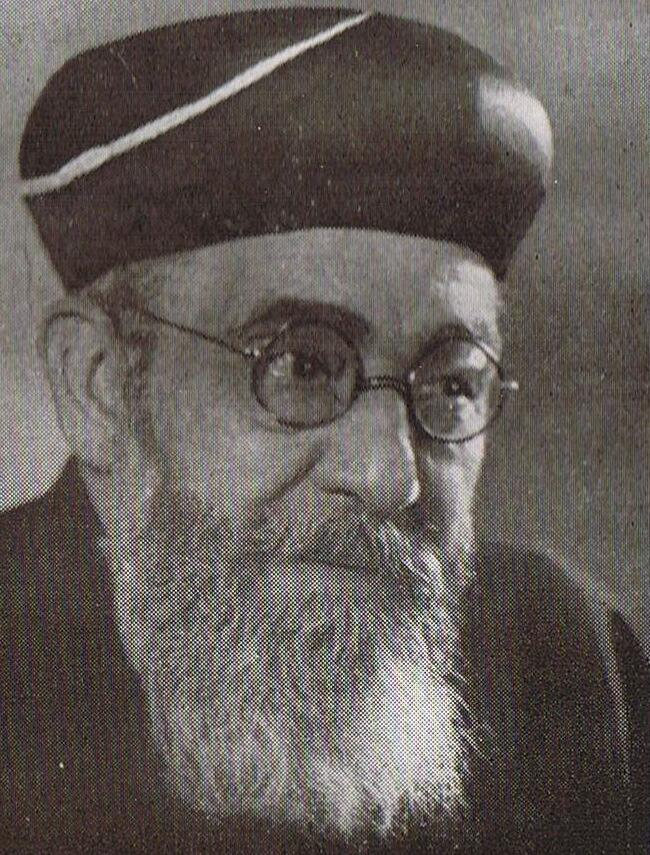
- Ben-Zion Meir Hai Uziel

Personal life
- Born: 23 May 1880 Jerusalem, Mutasarrifate of Jerusalem
- Died: 4 September 1953 (aged 73) Israel

Religious life
- Religion: Judaism
- Denomination: Sephardic

Jewish leader
- Predecessor: Yaakov Meir
- Successor: Yitzhak Nissim
- Position: Sepharadi Chief Rabbi of Israel
- Began: 1939
- Ended: 1953

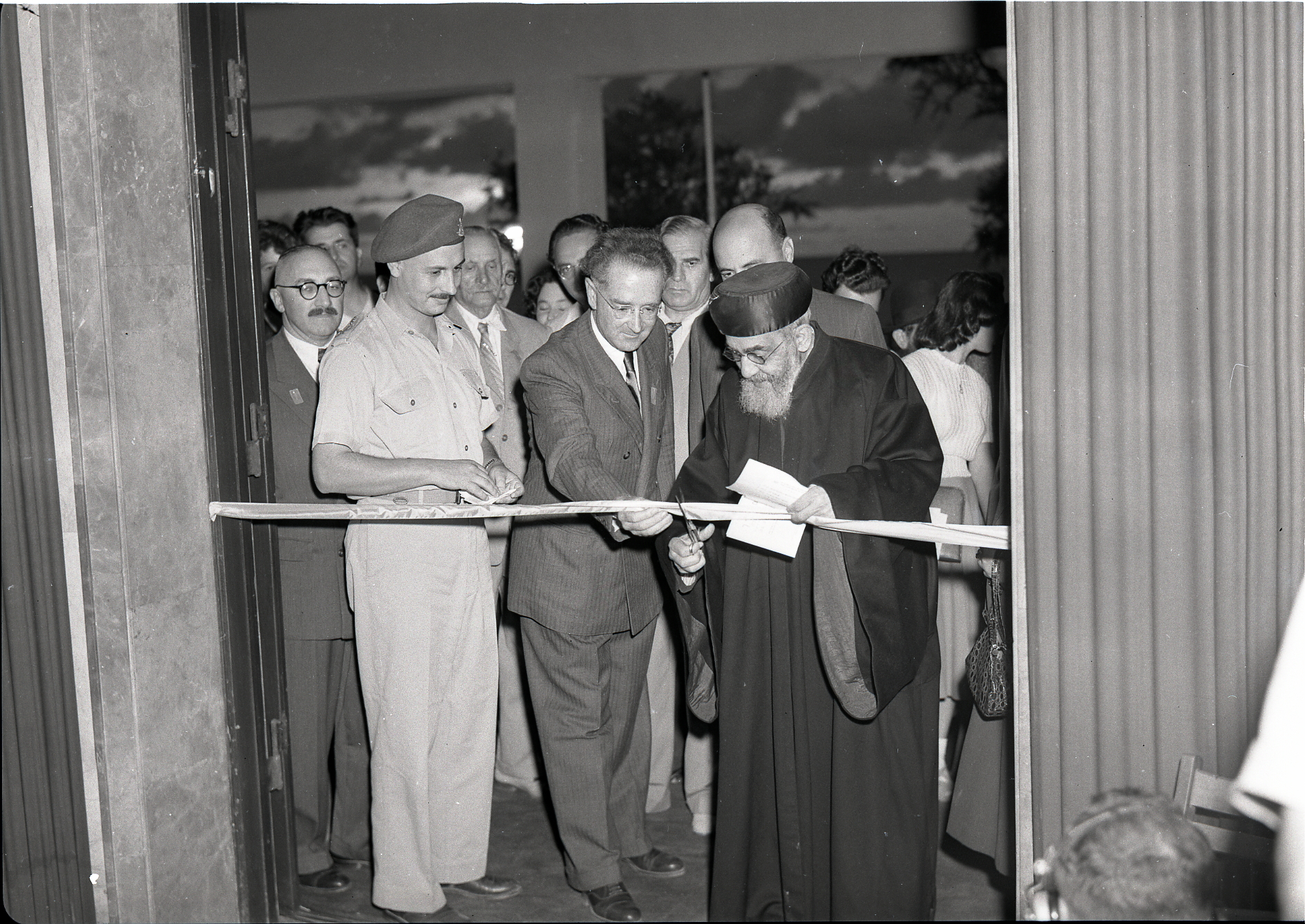
Rabbi Uziel at the opening of an exhibition, with General Yigael Yadin

Ben-Zion Meir Hai Uziel (Hebrew: בן ציון מאיר חי עוזיאל; 23 May 1880 – 4 September 1953), sometimes rendered as Ouziel, was the Sephardi chief rabbi of Mandatory Palestine from 1939 to 1948, and of Israel from 1948 until his death in 1953.

== Biography ==
Ben-Zion Meir Hai Uziel was born in Jerusalem, where his father, Joseph Raphael, was the chief justice of the Sephardi community of Jerusalem, as well as president of the community council. At the age of twenty he became a yeshivah teacher and also founded a yeshivah called Mahazikei Torah for Sephardi young men.

== Rabbinic career ==
In 1911, Uziel was appointed Hakham Bashi of Jaffa and the district. There he worked closely with Abraham Isaac Kook, who was the spiritual leader of the Ashkenazi community. Immediately upon his arrival in Jaffa, he began to work vigorously to raise the status of the Oriental congregations there. In spirit and ideas he was close to Kook, and their affinity helped to bring about more harmonious relations than previously existed between the two communities.

During World War I, Uziel was active as a leader and communal worker. His intercession with the Ottoman government on behalf of persecuted Jews finally led to his exile to Damascus but he was permitted to return to Palestine, arriving in Jerusalem before the entry of the British army. In 1921, he was appointed chief rabbi of Salonika, accepting this office with the consent of the Jaffa-Tel Aviv community for a period of three years. During He returned to become chief rabbi of Tel Aviv in 1923. During that time, he helped organize, establish, and lead the Ohel Moed Synagogue. In 1939, he was appointed Chief Sephardi Rabbi in the Land of Israel.

Uziel was a member of the Jewish Assembly of Representatives and the Jewish National Council, as well as being a representative at the meeting which founded the Jewish Agency. He appeared before the Mandatory government as a representative of the Jewish community and on missions on its behalf, and impressed all with his dignity and bearing. He was also founder of the yeshivah Sha'ar Zion in Jerusalem. He contributed extensively to newspapers and periodicals on religious, communal, and national topics as well as Torah novellae and Jewish philosophy.

Uziel was an advocate for strong relationships between the Arab population of the new State of Israel and Jews. He spoke fluent Arabic, and believed in peace and harmony between the two parties.

Two days before his death he dictated his will and testament. It said, inter alia, "I have kept in the forefront of my thoughts the following aims: to disseminate Torah among students, to love the Torah and its precepts, Israel and its sanctity; I have emphasized love for every man and woman of Israel and for the Jewish people as a whole, love for the Lord God of Israel, the bringing of peace between every man and woman of Israel—in body, in spirit, in speech, and in deed, in thought and in meditation, in intent and in act, at home and in the street, in village and in town; to bring genuine peace into the home of the Jew, into the whole assembly of Israel in all its classes and divisions, and between Israel and its Father in Heaven."

== Worldview ==
Uziel was strongly against the isolationist outlook of segments of the Haredi community, having said "It would be unacceptable and dangerous if religious Jews were to say: 'Let us stand in a corner as though looking at the events from a distance. Let us say to ourselves: we and our families will serve the Lord.'" He was also opposed to religious coercion, especially as part of the state.

Uziel had a global worldview, and saw the Jewish religion as having a message for the whole world, and the goal of Judaism is:

to live, to work, to build and to be built, to improve our world and our life, to raise ourselves and to raise others to the highest summit of human perfection and accomplishment

He was an advocate for secular and especially scientific, knowledge. To that end he advocated understanding the latest scientific discoveries.

He strongly advocated working for a living, especially for yeshiva students who should not live on handouts, and he was against the concept of army deferments for yeshiva students.

Uziel's personal philosophy was to try unite people rather than divide. He attempted to break down the divisions between the Ashkenazi community, Yemenites and the Sepharadim. He made "Love truth, and peace" the motto of his life. This verse (Zechariah 8:19) hung framed above his desk and was inscribed on his note paper.

== Halakhic rulings ==
Uziel issued many rulings in throughout his career. Some of these rulings include:

- Converts should be accepted even if we know for certain that they will not fulfill the commandments.
- Autopsies can be performed, and even as a study tool for trainee doctors. Uziel does not make a distinction between Jews and non-Jews with regards to autopsies.
- Women can vote and can be elected to public office.
- There is no halachic grounds for preventing a woman from serving on a Beth din, but that societal norms preclude this from happening.
- Permitted birth control and abortions in cases where it may harm the mother, or in the case of mamzerut.

== Published works ==
- Mishpetei Ouziel, responsa (1st ed., 3 vols., 1935–60; 2nd ed., 4 vols., 1947–64);
- Sha'arei Ouziel (1944–46), consisting of halakhah, general topics, and a selection of his addresses, letters, and other writings;
- Mikhmannei Ouziel (1939);
- Hegyonei Ouziel (1953–54), and still other works in manuscript.

| Preceded by Jacob Meir | Sephardi Chief Rabbi of Palestine; 1939–1948 | Succeeded by Obsolete title |
| Preceded by New creation | Sephardi Chief Rabbi of Israel; 1948–1954 | Succeeded by Yitzhak Nissim |
