= Yitzhak Yosef =

Former Sephardi Chief Rabbi of Israel (born 1952)

Rabbi Yitzhak Yosef יִצְחָק יוֹסֵף
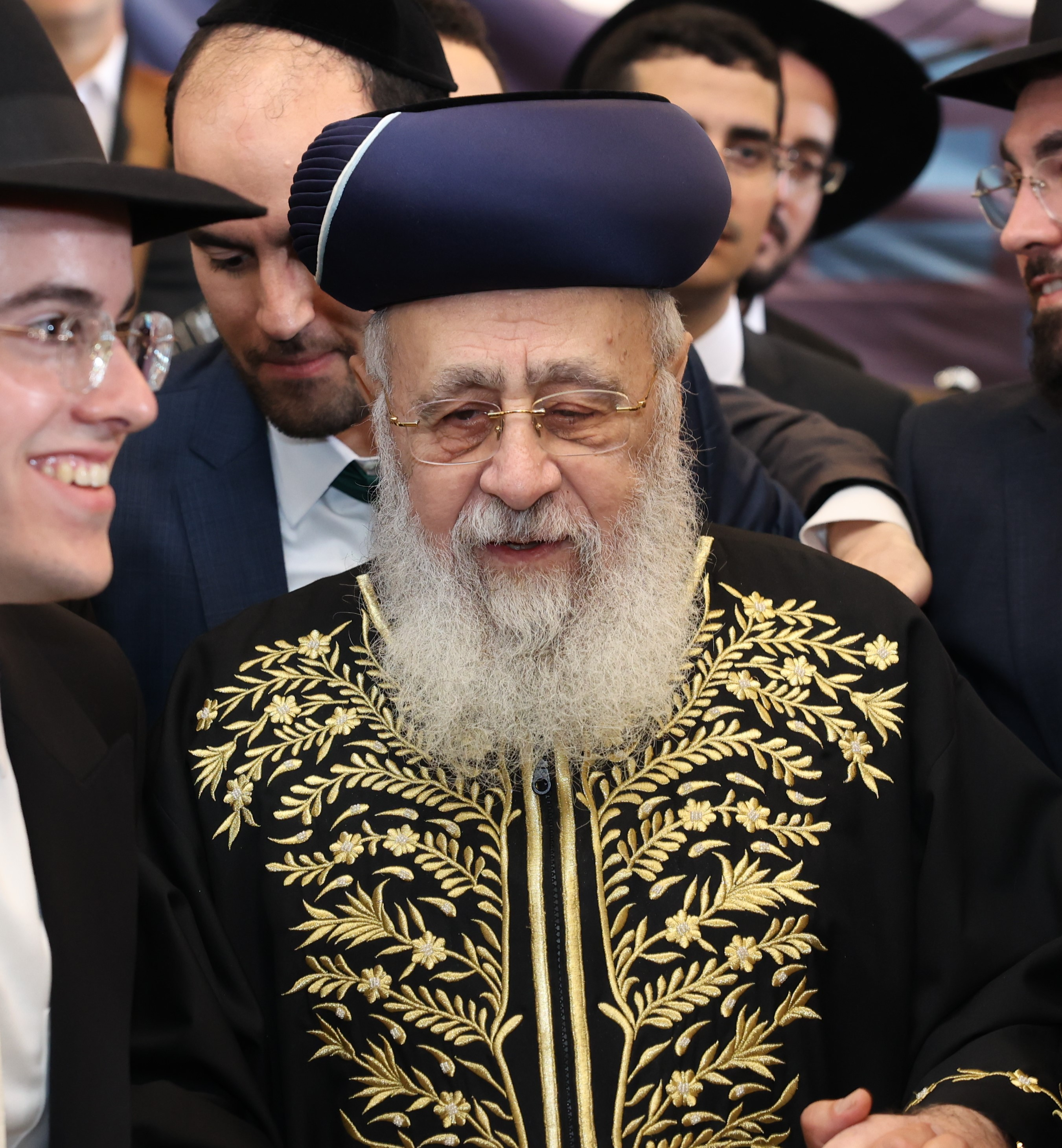
- Yosef in 2023
- Title: Rishon LeZion; Chief Rabbi of Israel

Personal life
- Born: January 16, 1952 (age 74) Jerusalem, Israel
- Spouse: Ruth Yosef
- Parents: Ovadia Yosef (father); Margalit Yosef (mother)
- Education: Hebron Yeshiva (Knesset Yisrael), Porat Yosef Yeshiva
- Relatives: David Yosef (brother)

Religious life
- Religion: Judaism
- Denomination: Sephardic Orthodox

Jewish leader
- Predecessor: Shlomo Amar
- Successor: David Yosef
- Position: Sephardi Chief Rabbi of Israel, Spiritual Leader of Shas
- Organisation: Chief Rabbinate of Israel
- Began: 2013
- Ended: June 30, 2024
- Main work: The "Yalkut Yosef" series, "Otzar Dinim Le'isha Velebat" (Laws for Women and Girls), "Dinei Chinuch Katan" (Laws on Child Education), "Ayin Yitzchak," and others
- Other: Rosh yeshiva of Yeshivat Hazon Ovadia; President of the Rabbinical High Court; Head of the Chazon Ovadia Yeshiva

Yitzhak Yosef (Hebrew: יִצְחָק יוֹסֵף, lit. 'Isaac Joseph'; born January 16, 1952) is an Israeli Haredi rabbi. The former Sephardi Chief Rabbi of Israel, he also serves as the rosh yeshiva of Yeshivat Hazon Ovadia in Jerusalem's Romema neighborhood. Since the end of his term as Chief Rabbi, he joined Moetzet Chachmei HaTorah, the rabbinic leadership council of the Shas party. In August 2026, he was recognized as the spiritual leader (Nasi) of the Moetzet Chachmei HaTorah and Shas party.

Yosef, the son of former chief rabbi Ovadia Yosef, bases his halakhic (Jewish law) rulings on his father's methodology, which he compiled into a set of books called Yalkut Yosef. He received the Israel Prize in Rabbinical literature for the year 2024.

== Early life ==
Yitzhak Yosef was born and raised in Jerusalem. He is the sixth son of the former Israeli Chief Rabbi and Shas spiritual leader Ovadia Yosef. He attended school at Talmud Torah Yavneh in the Independent Education System. At age 12 he began his studies at the mesivta (high school) of Porat Yosef in the Katamon neighbourhood. He did not finish high school, and called secular studies "nonsense". After that, he studied at Yeshivat HaNegev in Netivot, and from there he moved on to Hebron Yeshiva in Jerusalem.

In 1971, when he was 18 and studying at Yeshivat HaNegev, Yosef collected halakhic (Jewish law) rulings from the five volumes of then-in-print Yabia Omer, his father's responsa, and published them in a work called Yalkut Yosef. The book was published with his father's support and supervision. It is often considered one of his father's works, since not only is it a summary of his father's rulings, but the latter also went over it section by section and added his own comments. Yosef won the Rabbi Toledano Prize for Torah Literature from the Tel Aviv Religious Council for his book Issur VeHeter, as well as the Rabbi Kook Prize for Torah Literature.

== Rabbinic career ==
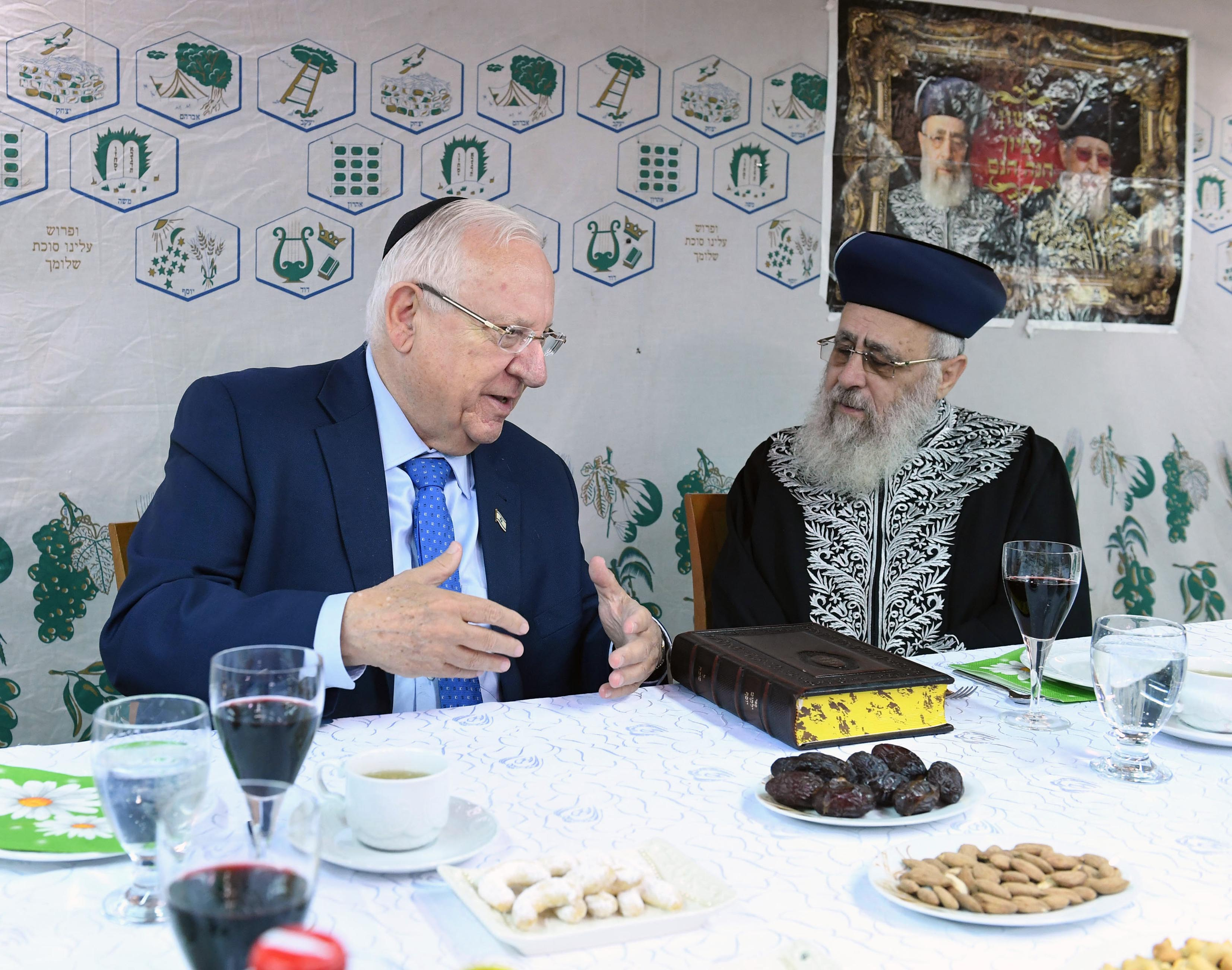
Yosef with Reuven Rivlin during the Sukkot holiday in 2017

In 1973, upon his father's election as Chief Rabbi of Israel, they together established Yeshivat Hazon Ovadia and its kollel (advanced studies department). In 1980, he and the rest of the first graduating class were ordained as rabbis and dayanim (rabbinic judges) by Shalom Messas and the chief rabbis of Israel. With the beginning of the second class, he was appointed head of the school.

In 1975, Yosef was appointed rabbi of Nes Harim and Mata, moshavim (villages) in the vicinity of Jerusalem. As part of his responsibilities, he taught classes on halakha several times a week and took care of other religious matters. He gave lectures and taught classes in the secular public schools and strengthened religious education there.

In 1992 Yosef expanded Hazon Ovadia to include a boys high school. This was necessary because of discord between the Sephardi Haredi and Ashkenazi Litvak yeshiva communities.

On July 24, 2013, Yosef was elected as Sephardi Chief Rabbi of Israel and the Rishon LeZion, a position he would hold for a decade. The ceremony took place on August 14, 2013, at the official residence of the President of Israel.

Through the death of Yosef's father, the Shas political party lost its spiritual leader. Having been elected Sephardi Chief Rabbi, Yosef appeared to be in a good position to inherit his father's mantle as Shas spiritual leader. However, his public position precluded such political activity by law. Until the election, he never held any formal public office.

On August 21, 2013, Yosef released a psak halakha (ruling) stating it is an obligation and mitzvah (good deed) for parents to have their children vaccinated for polio virus. In 2021, he endorsed the Alliance of Rabbis in Islamic States and serves as its halakhic guide.

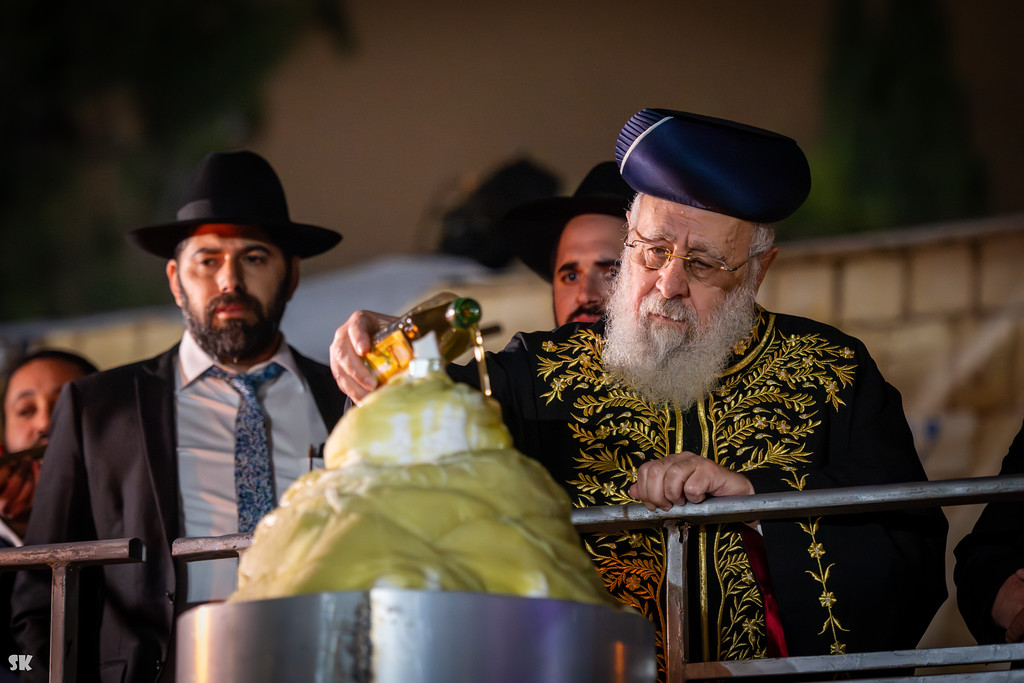
Yitzhak Yosef In Lag Ba'omer celebration 2024

Yosef's term as Chief Rabbi was extended twice from its original expected end in August 2023. After leaving the Chief Rabbinate, Yosef joined the Moetzet Chachmei HaTorah, the council of Rabbis which is the ultimate decision-making body in the Shas political party. Yosef was recognized as the Nasi (spiritual leader) of Shas and the Moetzet Chachmei Hatorah in August 2026.

== Controversies ==
=== 2016 ===
In March 2016 Yosef called for religious Jews to keep their children away from secular or traditional members of their family because they could be a negative influence.

Later that month, when Israel Defense Forces (IDF) Chief of Staff Gadi Eisenkot told military staff that rules of engagement must respect the law, and soldiers should not kill an attacker who has already been subdued, Yosef said soldiers must kill anyone who comes to attack them regardless of legal or military repercussions. Later he said: "If they no longer have a knife, they must be put in prison for life until the [Jewish] Messiah comes and says who are Amalekites, and then we can kill them."

He also said that according to Jewish law, gentiles "should not live in the Land of Israel" – unless they practice the Seven Laws of Noah, a set of universal moral laws. Should they refuse to do so, they should be sent to Saudi Arabia. He added that non-Jews are allowed in Israel to serve the Jewish population. Leaders of the Anti-Defamation League (ADL) condemned Yosef's statements and called for their retraction. Jonathan Greenblatt and Carole Nuriel of ADL Israel called the remarks ignorant and intolerant. He was eventually pressured into retracting his comments.

Controversy surrounds the authority of the Chief Rabbis in Israel, particularly on matters such as conversions, marriages, and rabbinic ordination. In 2016, it was discovered that the Chief Rabbis maintained a confidential list of approved and rejected beth dins (religious courts), causing further controversy as some Orthodox rabbis, including Avi Weiss and Yehoshua Fass, were included on the blacklist. This secretive process without external review or appeal led to confusion, and the situation was exacerbated when Orthodox rabbi Haskel Lookstein, and some of his students, were barred from officiating at marriages in Israel.

Lookstein officiated Ivanka Trump's conversion, causing tensions between Israel and the US. David Lau opposed Yosef's policy on recognizing US converts, but the rules were eventually changed.

In December, he said that it was "not the way of the Torah" for women to join the Israel Defense Forces or even sign up for Sherut Leumi (civilian national service): "All the great sages through the generations, including all Israel's chief rabbis, believe that it is forbidden for girls to go into the army. not just to the army – but to national service too."

=== 2017 ===
In May 2017, Yosef compared secular women to animals because they dressed immodestly.

=== 2018 ===
On March 18, 2018, Yosef likened people of black African descent to monkeys. He was speaking on the topic of the Meshaneh HaBriyot bracha, translatable as "Blessed are you, Lord our God.who makes creatures different", in the Talmud concerning the sight of an unusual creature, typically an animal, but also humans with congenital abnormalities. In the Talmud for Masekhet Berakhot (58b), there is debate over when to give this blessing for humans, and examples mentioned include "an (unusually) black, red, or white person, a giant, a dwarf, or one with spots".

In referring to black people, Yosef also used the ancient term kushi, the term present in the Talmud. The term is considered derogatory in modern Hebrew. He said: "Seeing a black person (kushi), you say the blessing. What black person? One who had a white mother and father, and came out black. Not on every black person do you make a blessing. When you walk in the streets of America, every five minutes, you see a black person. Will you say on him the blessing? Rather, it only needs to be on a black person whose mother and father are white. If, you know, two people birth a monkey (kof) or something like that, then you say the Different Creatures blessing." The Anti-Defamation League (ADL) tweeted that his comments were "utterly unacceptable".

=== 2019 ===
Following news that couples from the former Soviet Union were asked by rabbinical courts to take DNA tests to prove their Jewish ethnic descent; Yosef, alongside the Ashkenazi chief rabbi of Israel David Lau, sought new legislation that would allow Israeli rabbinical courts to challenge the Jewishness of a person – even if he was not even registered for marriage, and did not apply for religious services.

=== 2020 ===
In January 2020, he was criticized for calling immigrants from the former Soviet Union "Communist, religion-hating" gentiles. Prime Minister Benjamin Netanyahu called Yosef's remarks "outrageous" and said the immigrants from the former Soviet Union are a "huge blessing to the State of Israel and the Jewish people." Yosef's remarks also were slammed by others in the Knesset, including Knesset speaker Yuli Edelstein, who immigrated from Ukraine in 1987, and by Yisrael Beiteinu party leader Avigdor Liberman, who immigrated from Moldova. Yosef stood by his comments, saying they were distorted by politicians who had been inciting against Jews and Judaism and that he was only referring to a minority of immigrants.

=== 2021 ===
In January 2021, Yosef was criticized for flouting the coronavirus health restrictions.

In June 2021, he said science and mathematics are "nonsense", and students should only study Torah instead, adding proudly that he never finished school or received a high school diploma. Critics accused Yosef of promoting dependence on government handouts and charitable donations instead of advancing self-reliance. The large majority of ultra-Orthodox boys do not study the core curriculum of mathematics, English, science and computer studies at elementary school level, and the overwhelming majority do not study this curriculum at high school level. Socioeconomic experts have warned that this failure to provide a basic education to boys in the Haredi sector combined with its high rate of population growth means the economy will be imperiled with an inadequate workforce for the 21st century.

In July 2021, the rabbi caused outcry when he stated that it is "better to live abroad than among secular Israelis".

=== 2025 ===
Following controversy relating to the conscription of yeshiva students, Yosef warned Haredi lawmakers not to rely on Benjamin Netanyahu, calling him an "atheist [who] doesn’t believe in anything." He also criticized the arrests of deserters from the military, asking "What is this, Russia? Is there a communist regime here?", and told followers not to cooperate with the authorities in this regard. Additionally, he threatened that the Haredi community would emigrate to other countries en masse, rather than being required to enlist in the army.

== Personal life ==
He was briefly married to Edna, They divorced, and he married Ruth. They have five children. His eldest son, named after his father Ovadia, is married to the daughter of Shlomo Amar, his predecessor as Sephardic Chief Rabbi of Israel. His daughter Margalit is married to the son of Yehuda Deri, the former Chief Rabbi of Be'er Sheva. Yosef lives in the Sanhedria Murhevet neighborhood of Jerusalem.

== See also ==
Jewish titles
Preceded by Shlomo Amar	Sephardi Chief Rabbi of Israel; 2013–2024	Most recent
