= Yaakov Chaim Sofer =

Sephardic rabbi, kabbalist, talmudist and poseq

Rabbi Yaakov Chaim Sofer
- יעקב חיים סופר
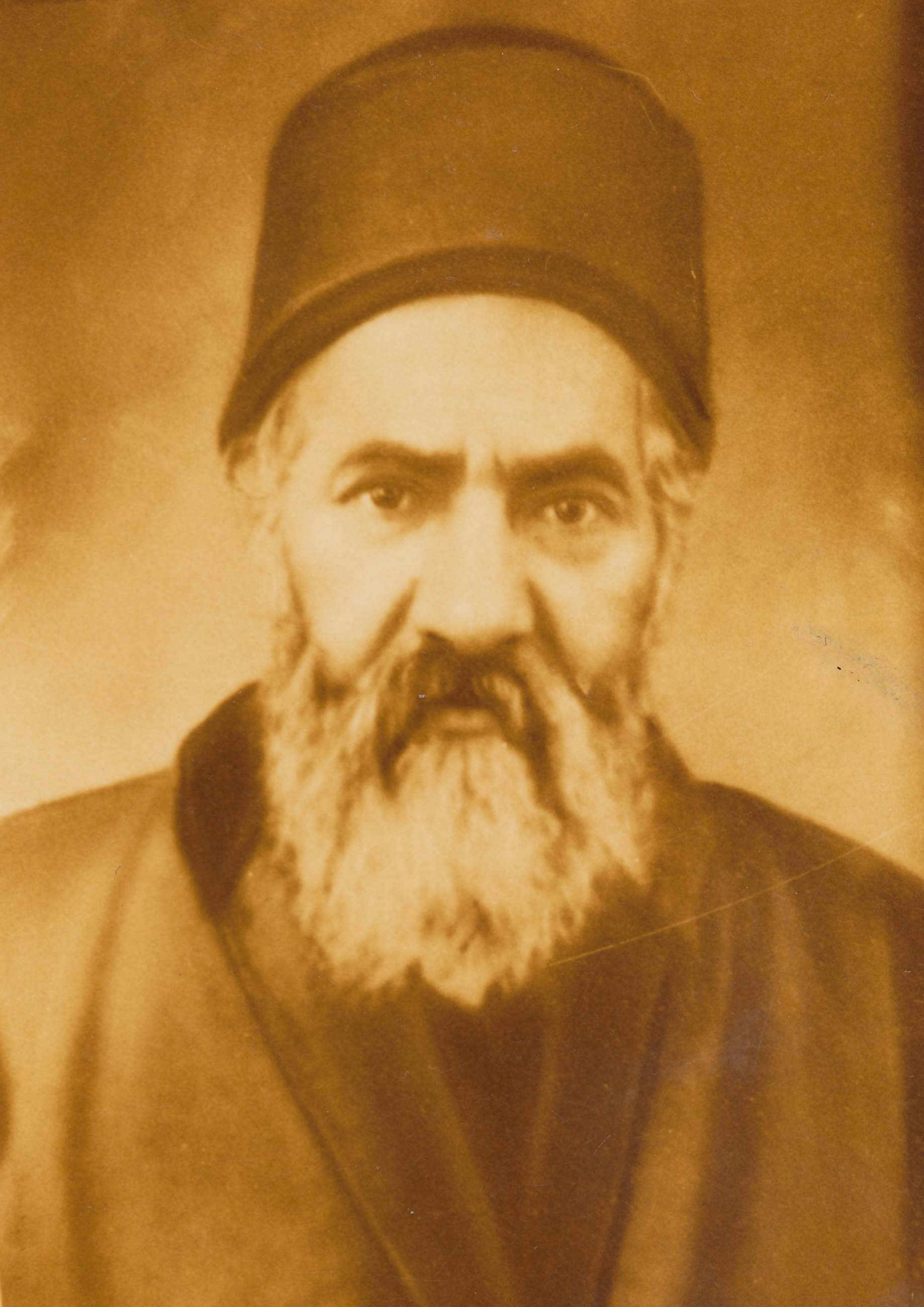
- Rabbi Yaakov Chaim Sofer

Personal life
- Born: 1870 Baghdad, Ottoman Iraq
- Died: 1939 (aged 68–69) Jerusalem, Mandatory Palestine
- Notable work(s): Kaf Hakhaim, Kol Yaakov, Yagel Yaakov, Yismach Yisrael, Chayim Ad Haolam
- Known for: Author of Kaf Hakhaim
- Occupation: Rabbi, kabbalist, talmudist, poseq

Religious life
- Religion: Judaism

Yaakov Chaim Sofer (Hebrew: יעקב חיים סופר; 1870-1939) was a Sephardic rabbi, kabbalist, talmudist and poseq. He is the author of Kaf Hakhaim, a work of halakha.

== Biography ==
Sofer was born in Baghdad, Ottoman Iraq. He studied the Torah under Abdallah Somekh and the Yosef Hayyim. In 1904, he journeyed to the Ottoman Palestine together with colleagues Sadqa Hussein and the Asei HaYa'ar to meet with the Hakham Bashi, Yaakov Shaul Elyashar, and to pray at the graves of the righteous. After visiting Jerusalem, he decided to settle there permanently. He studied in the yeshiva of Beit El Synagogue in the Old City of Jerusalem, well known for the study of kabbalah. In 1909, he moved to the newly founded Shoshanim leDavid yeshiva. It was here that he composed his works.

Sofer authored several works of halakha and aggadah. His books are known for discussing the original traditions of Iraqi Jews.

== Works ==
In Kaf Hachaim (כף החיים), Sofer discusses the halakha in light of the Rishonim and Acharonim. Kaf Hachaim, usually published in ten volumes, covers Orach Chayim (8 vol.) and parts of Yoreh De'ah (2 vol.). It is often compared to the Mishnah Berurah in terms of scope and approach, but differs in its more extensive reliance upon quotations. This work also surveys the views of many kabbalistic sages (particularly Isaac Luria), when these impact the Halakha. Shinun Halacha is a work summarising the Halakhic conclusions presented in Kaf Hachaim.

In addition to the Kaf Hachaim, Sofer authored:

- Kol Yaakov: on the laws of writing torah scrolls, tefillin, and mezuzot, as well as on the tefillin in general
- Yagel Yaakov: a compendium of Shabbat drashot (sermons) delivered while in mourning for his father
- Yismach Yisrael: novellae on the parsha, the weekly Torah reading.
- Chayim Ad Haolam on the aggadah of the Talmud
