= Badatz Beit Yosef =

Sephardic kosher certification

Badatz Beit Yosef is a kosher certification that is widely used by Sephardic and other Jews in Israel. Badatz Beit Yosef follows the guidelines set by Rabbi Yosef Caro. In Israel, an estimated 70 percent of restaurants use the Badatz Beit Yosef standard. Badatz Beit Yosef was the first kosher-certifying organization to certify cigarettes for Passover. Badatz Beit Yosef is the leader in kosher slaughter of chicken for Orthodox Jews in Israel.

== Management ==
Badatz Beit Yosef was run by Ovadia Yosef until his death in 2013 and is currently run by his son Rabbi Moshe Yosef. Rabbi Ariel Atias is a former manager of Badatz Beit Yosef. Rabbi Lior Edri, a former member of the Israeli Knesset, is a certification manager at Badatz Beit Yosef.
