= Carol Anne =

Carol Anne or Carol-Anne is a blended name combining Carol and Anne that is a Danish, English, Norwegian and Swedish feminine given name derived from the names Karl and Hannah. Notable people referred to by this name include the following:

== Given name ==
=== Known as Carol Anne or Carol-Anne ===
- Carol Anne Bond, petitioner in Carol Anne Bond, Petitioner v. United States
- Carol Anne Davis (born 1961), Scottish crime novelist
- Carol-Anne Day (born 1986), Canadian actress and musician
- Carol Anne Haley (born 1972), Canadian politician
- Carol Anne Letheren (1942–2001), Canadian executive
- Carol Anne Meehan (born 1956), Canadian politician
- Carol Anne O'Marie (1933–2009), American Roman Catholic sister and writer
- Carol Anne Riddell, American reporter and journalist

=== Known as Carol ===
- Carol Anne Evans, known as Carol Evans, (1938–2007), Welsh cricketer
- Carol Anne Gotbaum, known as Carol Gotbaum (1960s – 2007), South African-born air traveler
- Carol Anne Gotway Crawford, known as Carol A. Gotway Crawford, American mathematical statistician
- Carol Anne Heimer, known as Carol Heimer (born 1951), American sociology professor
- Carol Anne Hughes, known as Carol Hughes (author) (born 1961), British-born American novelist
- Dame Carol Anne Kidu, known as Carol Kidu or Carol, Lady Kidu, DBE (born 1948), Australian-born Papua New Guinean politician
- Carol Anne Martin, known as Carol Martin (born 1957), Australian politician
- Carol Anne Morley, known as Carol Morley (born 1966), English film director, screenwriter and producer
- Carol Anne Page, known as Carol Page (1948–2023), British sport shooter
- Carol Anne Philipps, known as Carol Philipps (1965–2009), Canadian journalist and activist
- Carol Anne Franziska Antonia Pilars de Pilar, known as Carol Pilars de Pilar (born 1961), German artist
- Carol Anne Tavris, known as Carol Tavris (born 1944), American social psychologist and feminist
- Carol Anne Williams, known as Carol Williams (organist) (born 1962), British-born composer

== Fictional character ==
- Carol Anne Freeling, main character in the Poltergeist franchise

== See also ==
- Carolanne D'Astous-Paquet
- Carol Ann
