= Carolan (surname) =

Carolan is a surname that is an Anglicized form of Gaelic Ó Cearbhalláin, meaning ‘descendant of Cearbhallán’, which is a diminutive of the personal name Cearbhall (see Carroll). Notable people with the name include the following:

- Brett Carolan (born 1971), American football player
- Brian Carolan (1927–1983), Australian sailor
- Cathal Carolan, Irish Gaelic footballer
- Edwin Carolan (died 1982), Irish Gaelic footballer
- Joe Carolan (1937–2018), Irish football player
- Kate Carolan (born 1982), Irish-American news reporter
- Kevin Carolan (born 1968), American actor
- Michael Carolan (1875–1930), Irish republican activist
- Niall Carolan (born 2002), Irish Gaelic footballer
- Nigel Carolan (born 1974), Irish rugby coach
- Paddy Carolan, Irish Gaelic footballer
- Ray Carolan, Irish Gaelic footballer
- Reggie Carolan (1939–1983), American football player
- Robert F. Carolan (born 1945), American judge
- Robin Carolan, English musician and composer
- Ronan Carolan, Gaelic footballer
- Stuart Carolan, Irish screenwriter, producer, and playwright
- Tom Carolan (born 1961), American music executive and entrepreneur
- Trevor Carolan (born 1951), Canadian writer

== See also ==
- Turlough O'Carolan (1670–1738), Irish harper and composer
- Carola
- Carolan (disambiguation)
- Carolane Soucisse
- Carolann
- Carolean (disambiguation)
- Carolyn
