= Carol Ann =

Carol Ann or Carol-Ann is a blended name combining Carol and Ann that is an English feminine given name derived from the names Karl and Hannah. Notable people referred to by this name include the following:

== Given name ==
=== Known as Carol Ann or Carol-Ann ===
- Carol Ann Abrams (1942–2012), American television and film producer, author and academic
- Carol Ann Carter (born 1947), American artist
- Carol Ann Cole (1963–1980), American murder victim
- Carol Ann Conboy (born 1947), American jurist
- Carol Ann Drazba (1943–1966), American Army nurse
- Carol Ann Duffy (born 1955), British poet and playwright
- Carol Ann Duthie (1937–2001), Canadian water skier
- Carol Ann Heavey (fl. 1984) Irish swimmer
- Carol-Ann James, West Indian cricketer
- Carol Ann Lee (born 1969), English author and biographer
- Carol Ann Mooney, American academic
- Carol Ann Peters (1932–2022), American figure skater
- Carol-Ann Schindel, American politician
- Carol Ann Shudlick Smith, American basketball player
- Carol Ann Susi (1952–2014), American actress
- Carol Ann Tomlinson, American educator, author and speaker
- Carol Ann Toupes (1936–2004), American triplet
- Carol Ann Whitehead, Royal Society of Arts Fellow

=== Known as Carol ===
- Carol Ann Alt, known as Carol Alt (born 1960), American model and actress
- Carol Ann Bartz, known as Carol Bartz (born 1948), American business executive
- Carol Ann Marie Bassett, known as Carol A.M. Bassett, Bermudian politician
- Carol Ann Beaumont, known as Carol Beaumont, (born 1960), New Zealand politician
- Carol Ann Blazejowski, known as Carol Blazejowski (born 1956), American basketball player
- Carol Ann Bower, known as Carol Bower (born 1956), American rower
- Carol Ann Burns, known as Carol Burns (1947–2015), Australian actress and theatre director
- Carol Ann Campbell, known as Carol Campbell (politician), (?? – 2008), American politician
- Carol Ann Christian, known as Carol Christian, (born 1950) is an American astronomer and science communicator
- Carol Ann Corrigan, known as Carol Corrigan (born 1948), American jurist
- Carol Ann Crawford, known as Carol Crawford (1934–1982)
- Carol Ann Decker, known as Carol Decker (born 1957), English musician and lead vocalist for T'Pau
- Carol Ann DiBattiste, known as Carol A. DiBattiste (born 1951), American lawyer, administrator and executive
- Carol Ann Doda, known as Carol Doda (1937–2015), American adult entertainer
- Carol Ann Fowler, known as Carol Fowler, American experimental psychologist
- Carol Ann Heyer, known as Carol Heyer (born February 2, 1950)[1] is an American illustrator and children's writer
- Carol Ann Hovenkamp-Grow, known as Carol Grow (born 1971), American beauty queen, model and actress
- Carol Ann Judge, known as Carol Judge, (1941–2014), American healthcare advocate
- Carol Ann Lloyd, born as Carol Ann Cramb and known as Carol Lloyd, (1948–2017), Australian singer, songwriter, and composer
- Carol Ann Laverne Morris, known as Carol Morris (born 1936), American actress, model and beauty queen (Miss Universe 1956)
- Carol Ann Peterka, known as Carol Peterka (born 1963), American handball player
- Carol Ann Rymer Davis, known as Carol Rymer Davis, (1944–2010), American balloonist, and radiologist
- Carol Ann Shields, known as Carol Shields (1935–2003), American-born novelist and short story writer
- Carol Ann Colclough Strickland, known as Carol Strickland (born 1946), American art historian
- Carol Ann Windley, known as Carol Windley, (born 1947), Canadian short story writer and novelist
- Carol Ann Yager, known as Carol Yager (1960–1994), extremely obese American

=== Known by another name ===
- Carol Ann Surasky, maiden name of Chana Timoner (born 1951), American rabbi and military officer
- Carol Ann Holness, known by stage name Nancy Nova, English singer and songwriter
- Carol Ann Wells, known as Annie Wells (born 1972), Scottish politician

== Fictional character ==
- Carol Ann, character from Mommie Dearest (film)

== See also ==
- Caril Ann Fugate
- Carol Anne
- Carolan (disambiguation)
- Carole Ann
