= Carole Ann =

Carole Ann or Carole-Ann is a feminine given name formed by blending Carole and Ann, which are derived from the names Karl and Hannah. Notable people with this name include:

== Given name ==
=== Known as Carole Ann or Carole-Ann ===
- Carole Ann Boone, former wife of serial killer Ted Bundy
- Carole Ann Ford (born 1940), British actress
- Carole Ann Haswell British professor of astrophysics and astronomy
- Carole Ann Klonarides (born 1951), American curator, video artist, writer and art consultant

=== Known as Carole ===
- Carole Ann Jones, known as Carol Lynley (1942 – 2019), American actress
- Carole Ann Pope, known as Carole Pope, British-born Canadian rock singer-songwriter
- Carole Ann Radziwill, born Carole Ann DiFalco and known as Carole Radziwill (born 1963), American journalist, author, and reality television personality
- Carole Ann Seborovski, known as Carole Seborovski (born 1960), American artist

== See also ==
- Carol Ann
- Carolean (disambiguation)
