= Trident A Range =

English recording console model

Trident A Range consoles were originally built by and for Trident Studios. When word spread about this revolutionary new multi-track recording console design, other studios placed their orders and Trident Audio Developments was formed. Cherokee Studios in Los Angeles was one of the early recipients of one of the first production models. David Bowie, Rod Stewart, and Frank Sinatra are among the early artists who first recorded hit records on Cherokee's first A Range console. With only 13 consoles ever built of this model, the Trident A Range has attained a near mythical status in the professional recording industry: "Though it had a very limited run, the Trident A Range console gained a reputation for its very distinct and pleasant sound with a very "musical" EQ section. Along with channel strips from early Neve and Helios consoles, original Trident A Range modules have kept a healthy resale value and are much sought after by engineers who like to combine old-school analog gear with leading-edge digital recording technology."

== Cherokee Studios & Trident A Ranges ==
Cherokee Studios and Trident A Ranges have a long history together. Cherokee was one of the first customers for the new console, and the first recording studio in the United States to take delivery and begin recording with one. Cherokee Studios became synonymous with the Trident A Range console as the boards recorded over 300+ gold and platinum records while working at the world famous studio during its more than 35+ year run and is still in use to this day at the re-located Cherokee Studios located on Melrose Avenue in Hollywood.

In the 1970s, Cherokee's owners, the Robb brothers, had been looking for a console when they heard Harry Nilsson and The Beatles "Hey Jude." The recordings sounded so different from anything else at the time that they hunted down the common denominator – the recording console at Trident Studios in London.

The Robbs were transitioning from their ranch studio to the former MGM Records space on Fairfax. While they were making their very important console decision, they had received 2 channels from Neve, Helios and Cadac. At the last minute, 2 Trident A Range modules arrived from England in an inelegant mess inside a box. They mic'd a set of drums, pit the modules against each other and the Tridents made such an impression that it was no longer a contest. They ordered their first console, and ultimately purchased four (3 new directly from Trident Audio Developments and 1 from a broker).

As of May 2026, of the four A Ranges Cherokee owned, they still own one (the one purchased through the broker with the additional inputs added which became their Studio 1 console). The first A-Range purchased by Cherokee, which became their Studio 3 console, was sold to Long View Farm Studios in Massachusetts and then purchased by Cello Studios (now EastWest Studios) in Hollywood for their Studio 3. Number 13 was sold to Smart Studios in Madison, Wisconsin, and was the console in their downstairs "A" room. Cherokee's other A-Range sat unused for ten years and has since been in use at Avast! Recording Co. in Seattle, Washington.

As of May 2026, Studio Bell at the National Music Centre in Calgary, Canada has one of the 13 A-Range boards.
