= Law of Kosovo =

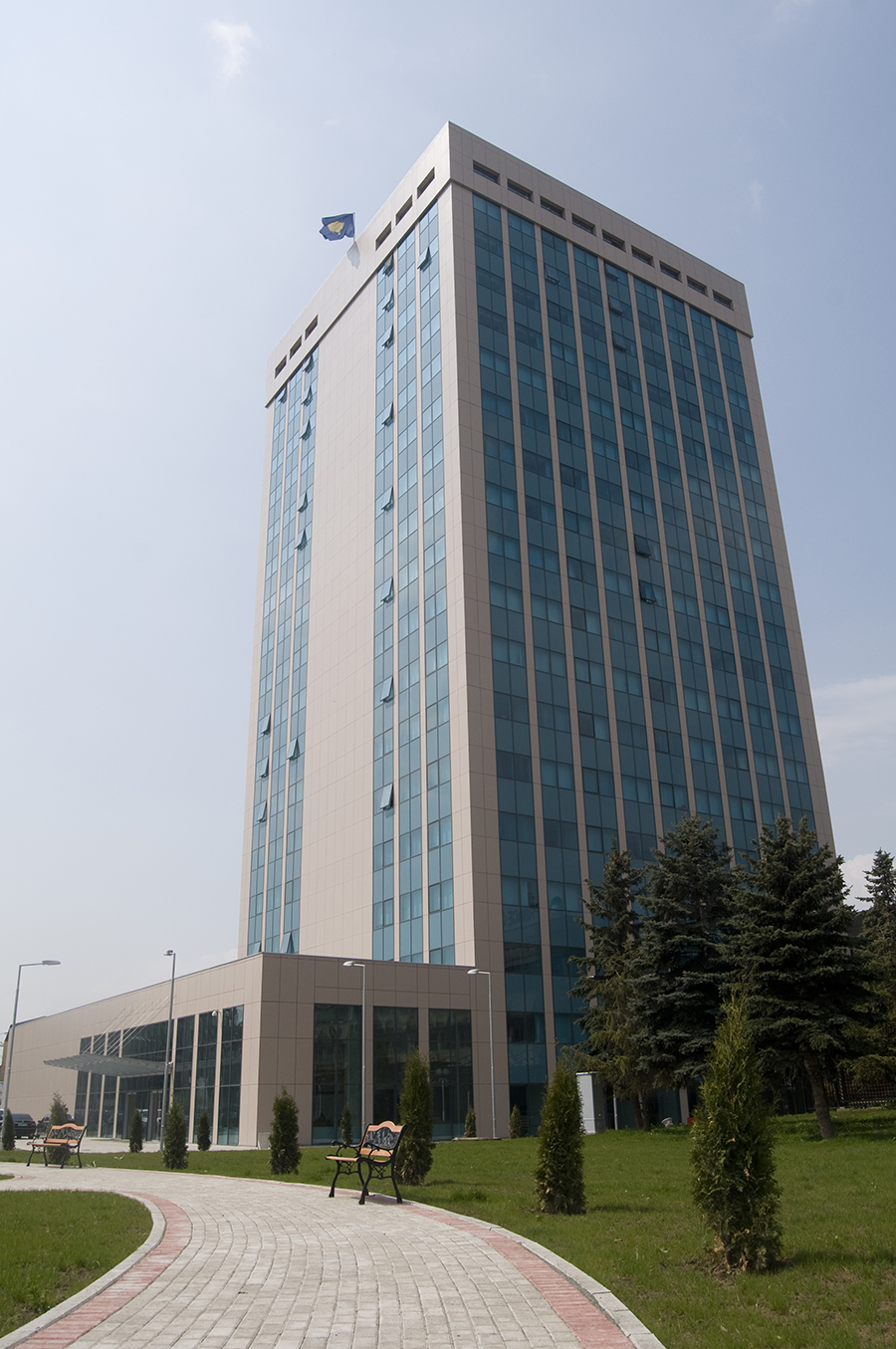
Ministry of Justice drafts the legislation in accordance with the constitution of the Republic of Kosova and harmonizes the laws with the EU standards, develop international legal cooperation, and ensure easier access in the justice institutions for the minorities

Kosovo has a civil law system which is also sometimes known as the Continental European law system. The central source of law that is recognized as authoritative is codifications in a constitution or statute passed by legislature, to amend a code. This system of Kosovo has experienced several changes throughout the years and is currently a system that includes prominent bodies and branches that help Kosovo enact adequate laws and conduct proper legal procedures.

== Historical context ==
Under the 1974 constitution of the Socialist Federal Republic of Yugoslavia (SFRY), Kosovo was an “autonomous province” within the SFRY and, as such, enjoyed substantial rights. As an autonomous province in the SFRY, Kosovo had a parliament, government, judiciary, constitutional court. In March 1989, following the rise to power of Slobodan Milošević, Kosovo's autonomy was reverted to pre-1974 status enabling Serbia's federal authorities to assume full control over the territory. Shortly thereafter, the newly installed leadership dismissed most Kosovo Albanians from their public positions, including the judiciary. Following the disintegration of SFRY, the aforementioned constitutional changes were sanctioned into law by the 1992 constitution of the Federal Republic of Yugoslavia, which was constituted of Serbia and Montenegro.

The applicable law in Kosovo stems from different sources with the following order of precedence:

1. Laws passed by the Kosovo Assembly after the constitution came into force in June 2008

2. UNMIK Regulations (with supporting Assembly laws) passed between June 1999 and June 2008

3. Laws dated prior to 22 March 1989

4. Laws dated between 22 March 1989 and 10 June 1999 which are not discriminatory.

=== Postwar period and legal transition ===
Following the end of the war in June 1999 Kosovo was placed under an international protectorate, pursuant to United Nations Security Council Resolution 1244, The resolution also provides for the creation of the United Nations Interim Administration Mission in Kosovo which is entrusted with the provisional administration of the territory and populations of Kosovo and the establishment of a temporary political structure. Its aim is to facilitate the establishment in Kosovo of autonomy and self-administration within Serbia.

==== UNMIK Regulation and supervision of the legal system ====
In accordance with UNSC Resolution 1244, UNMIK assumed full competencies in the legislative, executive and judicial branches of government that were exercised by the Special Representative of the Secretary-General (SRSG). In order to fill the legislative gap created during the decade of Milosevic's rule, UNMIK enacted laws in the form of executive decrees, commonly referred to as “UNMIK Regulations”. UNMIK regulations were intended to complement, and govern the precedence of, different legal instruments enacted in the past. Indeed, while the bulk of Kosovo legislation remained relevant, a number of laws enacted during Milosevic's rule, which introduced discriminatory provisions against the Kosovo Albanian community, were repealed. Consequently, UNMIK authorized the application of the domestic law as it was in effect before 22 March 1999 (before the abolishment of Kosovo's autonomy) and excluded the laws enacted between 1989 and 1999, except in cases when these legal instruments were not discriminatory and were needed to fill a legal vacuum. During its mandate, UNMIK progressively developed a comprehensive modern legal framework, which culminated with the enactment of the Constitutional Framework of Kosovo, on the basis of which the people of Kosovo were able to democratically elect their representatives on the local and central level. In 2000, UNMIK established an emergency justice system exclusively composed of local judges and prosecutors, who were subsequently joined by a limited number of international judges and prosecutors, who were responsible for serious and sensitive crimes.

While in the executive and legislative branches of government, UNMIK gradually transferred its competencies to Kosovo authorities, UNMIK retained executive control over the judiciary until Kosovo's independence. Although following the entry into effect of Kosovo constitution in 2008 UNMIK's role became largely redundant UNMIK is still present in Kosovo and continues to facilitate Kosovo's relations with countries that have not formally recognized its independence in general and with Serbia in the specific.

==== Constitution of the Republic of Kosovo ====
The Republic of Kosovo was declared independent on 17 February 2008. In April 2008 the Assembly of the Republic of Kosovo adopted the new constitution which has entered into force on 15 June 2008.The Constitution of the Republic of Kosovo (the “Constitution”) defines the Republic of Kosovo as an independent, sovereign, democratic, unique and indivisible state whose sovereignty stems from the people. The Constitution incorporates the Ahtisaari Plan as an integral part of the Kosovo constitutional order requiring all authorities in the Republic of Kosovo to abide by the Ahtisaari Plan and take all necessary action for its implementation. Kosovo's constitution is based on the Comprehensive Proposal for a Status Settlement for Kosovo, submitted by United Nations Special Envoy for the resolution of Kosovo's status (the "Ahtisaari Plan"), which provides for supervised independence, overseen by two international institutions, namely European Union Rule of Law Mission in Kosovo (EULEX) and the International Civilian Office (ICO). The Ahtisaari Plan provides a number of overriding protections for Kosovo's minorities and authorizes EULEX to assist Kosovo authorities in the rule of law area, with a particular focus on police, judiciary, and customs. In this respect, EULEX retains limited executive powers, in particular, to investigate, prosecute and adjudicate serious and sensitive crimes in cooperation with the Kosovo justice institutions. ICO, on the other hand, is responsible for supervising the implementation of the Ahtisaari Plan.

This very Constitution includes a justice system, assembly, government, the president and constitutional court as an integral part of its chapters and articles. Justice system is foreseen under Chapter VII respectively Articles 102 - 111, Assembly's functions and competencies are mentioned in the Articles 63 - 82, while Government and President's duties are found under Articles 83 - 101.

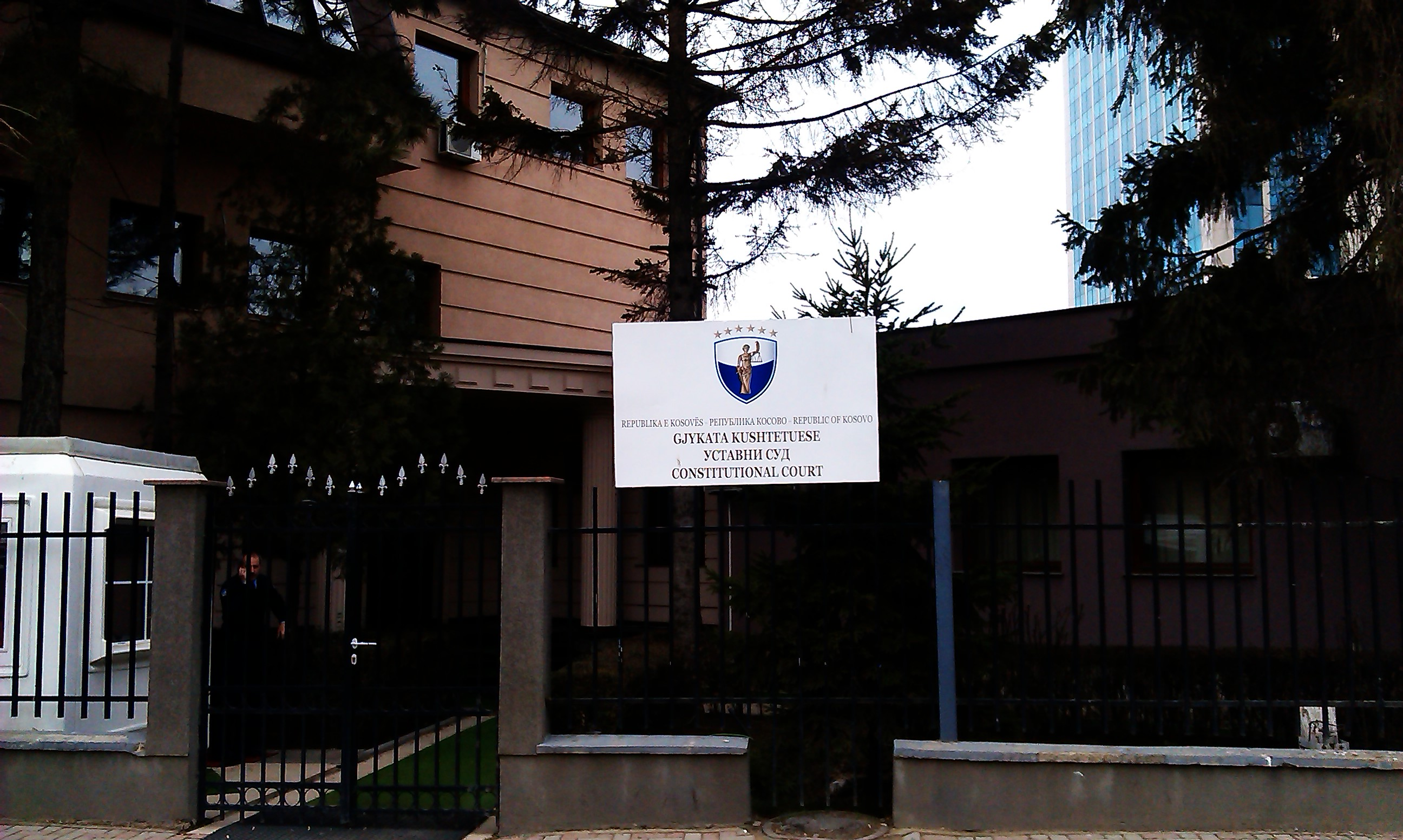
Constitutional Court of Kosovo

===== Constitutional Court =====
The Constitutional Court of the Republic of Kosovo was established in January 2009. Its mission is guaranteed with the Articles 112 - 118 of the Constitution. With its authority to review legislation and individual complaints of rights violations, the Court is the ultimate check on legislative and executive power in Kosovo and the final arbiter of the meaning of constitutional provisions enshrining human rights and freedoms. The Constitutional Court is the final authority for the interpretation of the Constitution and the compliance of laws with the Constitution.

The legal basis for the establishment of the Constitutional Court derived directly from the Constitution of the Republic of Kosovo, adopted in June 2008. This Constitution, following the declaration of independence, enshrined all the Ahtisaari provisions relating to the Constitutional Court and broadened the Court's jurisdiction to encompass certain specified claims brought by the Assembly, the President of Kosovo, the government and the Ombudsperson. The Constitution also included the right of regular courts to refer questions of constitutional compatibility of law to the Court when raised in a judicial proceeding.

The Court has nine Judges, each with a mandate of six years. These Judges are under the supervision of the Court President, a position that is currently held by Enver Hasani.

== Overview of the legal drafting process ==
The Republic of Kosovo is a democracy working under the Rule of Law, respect for its Constitution and laws, and the recognition of international law. The production of laws has grown considerably, and basic laws essential to the operation of the justice system have been adopted. As provided in the Law on Legislative Initiatives, laws in Kosovo are initiated either by the President, the Government, members of the Assembly or initiatives of 10,000 citizens. The vast majority of laws originate with the Executive Branch of the Government, where Ministries are responsible for proposing legislation as well as overseeing drafts and amendments of primary and secondary laws. Members of the Assembly can propose amendments to legislation by submitting a motion to the Assembly Table and the government for its opinion. Ministry drafts are sent to the Office of Legal Support Services (OLSS) within the Prime Ministers Office (PMO). The laws undergo a second tier of review at the Government level, from the OLSS, Ministry of Finance (MoF) and Agency for European Integration (AEI). After their review and approval the law is sent to the Coordinating Group of the Government and finally proceeds to the Assembly for review and adoption.

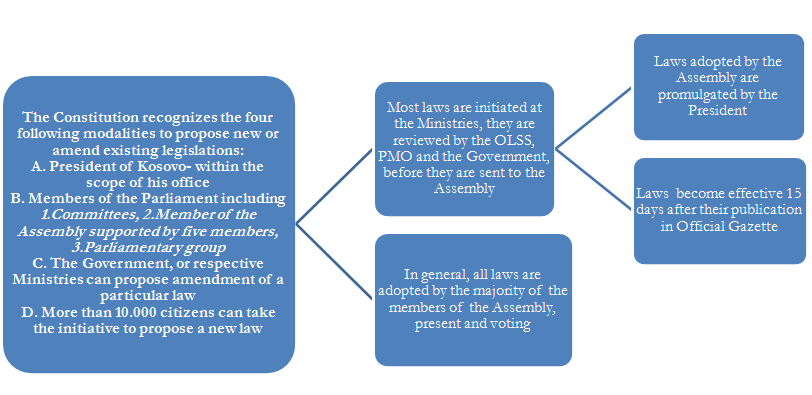
Law drafting and approval process

Laws most often originate at the Ministries, which are responsible for both drafting laws and amending new laws. Once the Minister approves the draft law, it is sent to the Prime Ministers Office and Office of Legal Support Services. OLSS is responsible for coordination and review of all draft laws drafted by the government. Once the OLSS reviews the law, a request is submitted to the Permanent Secretary of the PMO to establish a working group at the government level. After the government working group completes its review the, law is sent to the Ministry of Economy and Finance (MoEF) and Ministry for European Integration (MEI), before it will make its final rounds at the Assembly. The MOEF reviews the financial and budgetary implications of the law, while the MEI evaluates if the law is compatible with the EU legislation. Upon their approval of the law, the draft is sent to the PS of the PMO to be included on the agenda of the Government Coordinating Group for a final review. This is also the final step in the legal drafting process within the Government. Draft law is then forwarded to the Kosovo Assembly for their review. The law is afterwards registered with the Table Office at the Assembly. After registration, the law undergoes a “first hearing.” After the hearing, the law is reviewed by the respective functional Committees, which propose amendments and send it back for the second reading. A law can go through three readings in the Assembly. After a law is approved by the Assembly it is sent to the President who can sign it or return it within 8 days to the Assembly for revision. The law comes into effect once it is signed, and promulgated by the President 15 days after the publication in the Official Gazette.

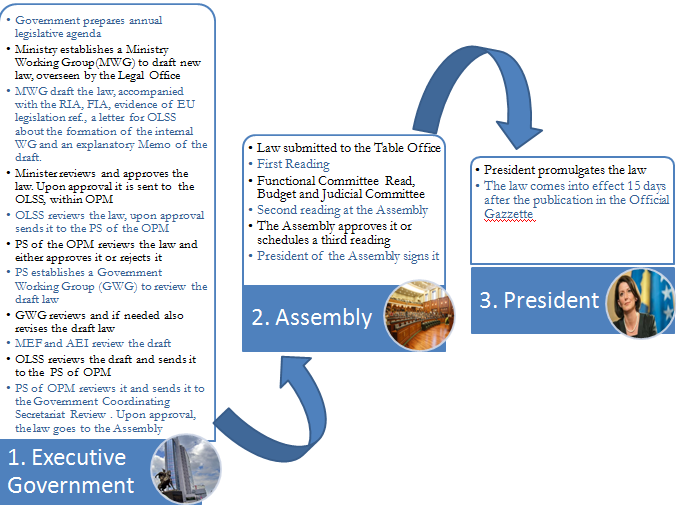
Kosovo Legal Drafting Process Overview

- Legislative drafting at the executive branch of the government – the first tier

The Government Cabinet comprising the Prime Minister and all other Ministers approve the Annual Legislation Plan. Each Ministry is responsible to initiate and oversee drafts of or amendments to the laws within their area of responsibility. The Permanent Secretary (PS) and the Head of the Legal Office lead and oversee the legal drafting process. Draft law is reviewed and subsequently approved by the Minister and the PS. The approved Law is sent to the Office of Legal Support Service (OLSS) within the Prime Minister's Office (PMO).

- Legislative drafting at the executive branch of the government – the second tier

The OLSS reviews and subsequently approves the law, and requests the PS of the PMO to establish a Government Working Group to review the law. The Government Working Group reviews the law and sends it further. The modified law is reviewed by the Ministry of Economy and Finance and the Ministry for European Integration. After their review the law is first provided to the PS of the PMO and subsequently to the Government Coordinating Group, which is composed of all the Ministries and the Prime Minister.

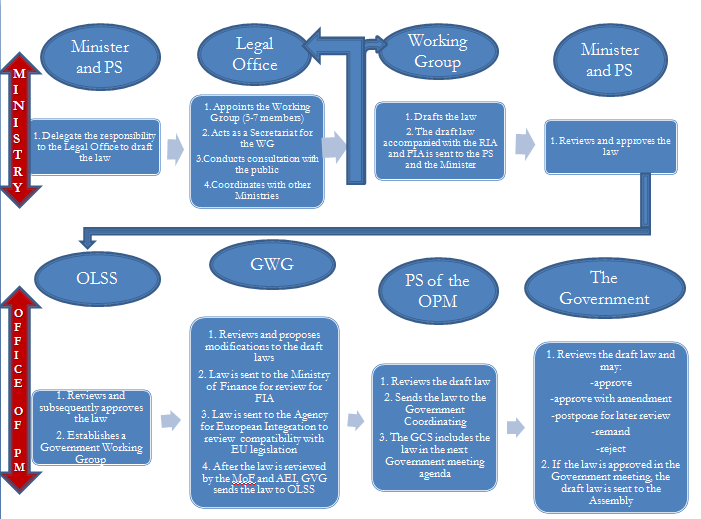
Legislative Drafting at the Executive Branch

- Legislative drafting at the Assembly

After the law has been approved by the Government, it is submitted to the Table Office of the Assembly, for registration. Registration of the law with the Assembly allows the law to be placed on the Assembly's agenda. The Assembly reviews the law and may approve it in the first hearing. Following the first hearing the law is sent to the Functional Committee and the Budget and Legislative Committee. A Functional Committee is one of the Assembly Committees depending on the sector the law is addressing. The Rules of Assembly enable all the Assembly Committees to hold public hearings with experts, public organizations and interest group representatives. Most of the laws are adopted after the second reading, only in rare occasions when the law fails to be adopted after its second reading it is sent to the Assembly for a third reading.

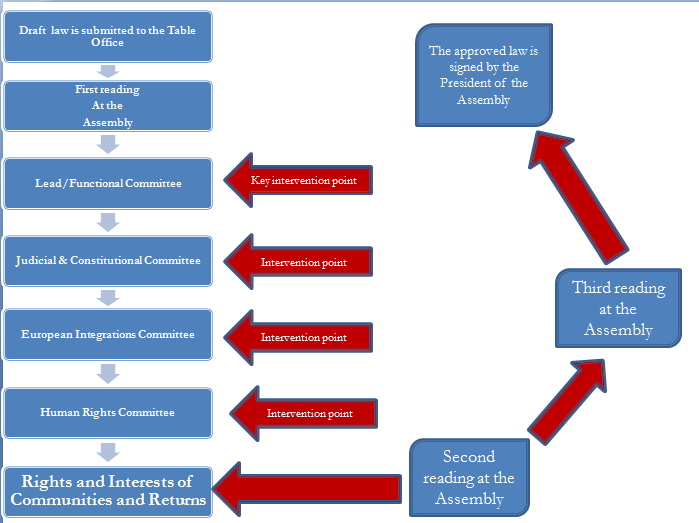
Legislative Drafting at the Assembly

- The President

Upon approval, the Assembly sends the law to the President for promulgation and the President has 8 days to promulgate the law or return it to the Assembly for reconsideration. The law may be returned to the Assembly for reconsideration if the President deems it to be violating of the legitimate interests of the Republic of Kosovo or one of the communities living therein.

== European Union Law Mission in Kosovo ==
EULEX is an integrated European Union Rule of Law Mission in Kosovo operating in the fields of justice, police and customs. In April 2009, EULEX became fully operational. The EU Joint Action of February 2008 and Council Decision of June 2010 and June 2012 provide the legal basis for the Mission. EULEX works within the framework of UN Security Council Resolution 1244. The Mission assists the Kosovo authorities, judicial authorities and law enforcement agencies in their progress towards sustainability and accountability. The Mission, in full co-operation with the European Commission Assistance Programmes, implements its mandate through monitoring, mentoring and advising. The Mission retains some executive responsibilities in areas such as organised crime, war crimes and serious financial crime. EULEX Justice staff are active in all Kosovo Courts and at all instances. There are more than 1,500 EULEX Police officers deployed throughout Kosovo. EULEX Customs has 6 mobile teams which criss-cross Kosovo to monitor, mentor and advice their local counterparts.

The Mission is divided into two 'divisions':

- the 'Executive Division' and
- the 'Strengthening Division'.

The Executive Division investigates, prosecutes and adjudicates sensitive cases using its executive powers. The Strengthening Division monitors, mentors, and advises local counterparts in the police, justice and customs fields.

== Bibliography ==
- Wolf Theiss, The Legal Guide to Kosovo, 2nd edition, March 2009
- Nicolas Mansfield, Creating A Constitutional Court:Lessons From Kosovo, 2013
- Robert Muharremi, The European Union Rule of Law Mission in Kosovo (EULEX) from the Perspective of Kosovo Constitutional Law, 2010
- Arsim Bajrami, Teoria dhe Praktika Parlamentare [Eng. Parliamentary Theory and Practice], Flaka, 2002
