= Bruce Robb =

American singer

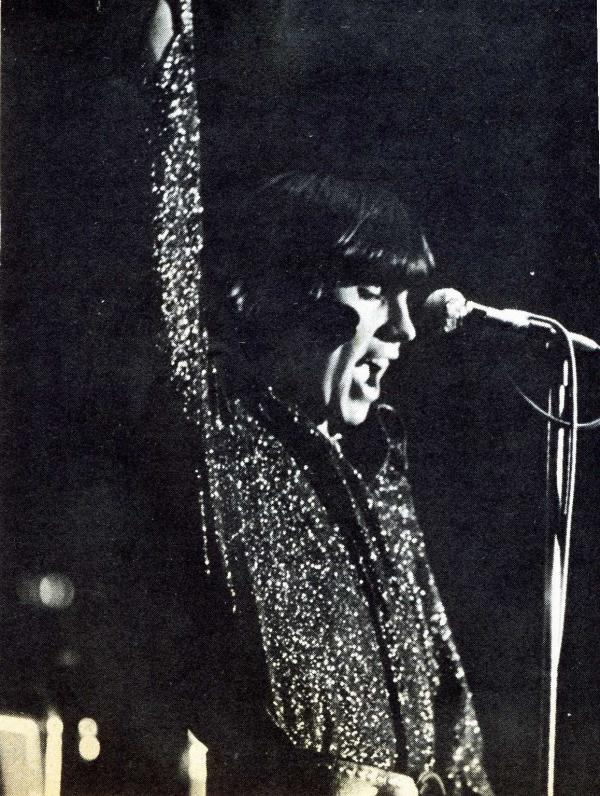

Background information
- Genres: Rock, R&B, blues, alternative rock, country rock, folk rock, classic rock, jazz
- Occupations: Record producer, audio engineer, musician, music supervisor
- Instruments: Hammond B3, keys, vocals
- Years active: 1967–present
- Labels: Chess, Argo, RCA, Mercury, Atlantic, ABC-Dunhill

Bruce Robb is an American musician, record producer, engineer, and music supervisor. He is most recognized for his time as a member of the Robbs during the 1960s, then as a founder of Cherokee Studios in the 1970s; followed by decades of producing, engineering and recording with artists like Mos Def, Macy Gray, Henry Rollins, Steve Vai, the Lemonheads, John Mellencamp, Steve Cropper, Ringo Starr, Etta James, Art Garfunkel, Rod Stewart, Del Shannon, and Wilson Pickett amongst others.

== Cherokee Studios founder ==
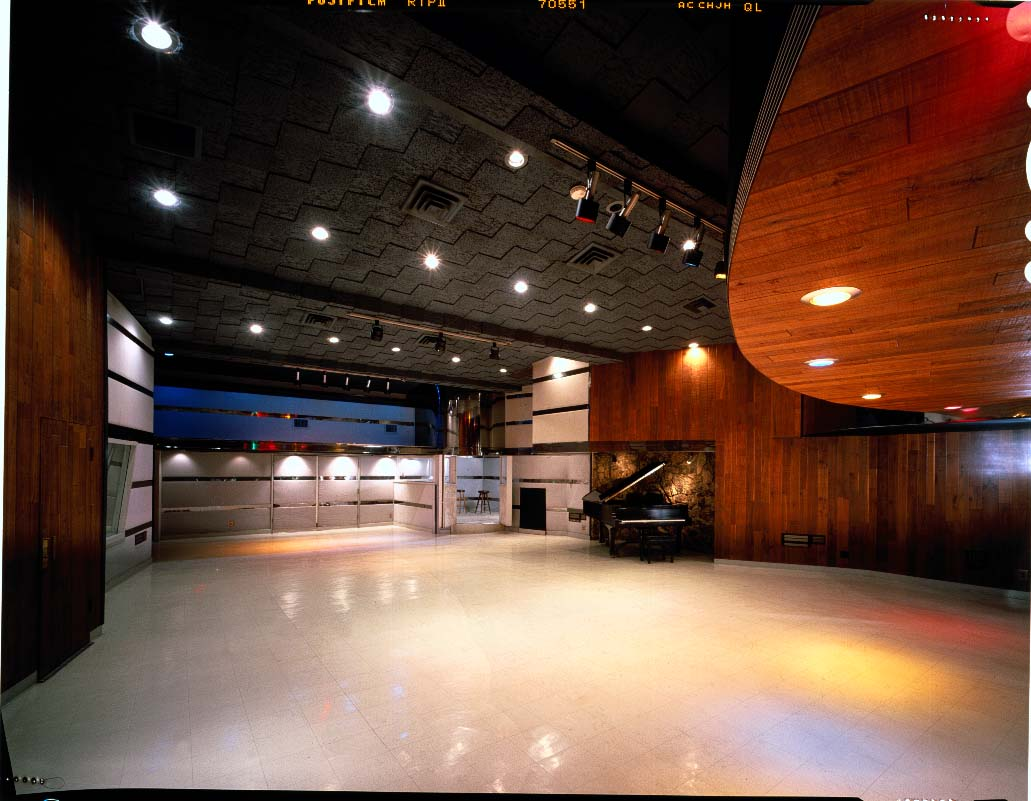

By 1969, the Robbs now calling themselves "Cherokee" had settled on a ranch in Chatsworth, California. With the help of friends Roger Nichols and Toby Foster, the band converted their barn into an artist-owned recording studio. Bruce was particularly enthusiastic about the idea because he had always disliked the sterile vibe in the studios of the era. The studio's first clients started with friends like Del Shannon, who brought Jeff Lynne from Electric Light Orchestra to the facility. As word spread about the facility, other artists of note – Little Richard, Bob Crewe, Michael McDonald and others – came to the studio to record. Then, Nichols recorded Steely Dan's "Pretzel Logic," which resulted in the studio, now known as "Cherokee Ranch", earning their first gold record. All the while, Bruce was honing his skills as an engineer and producer under the tutelage of his brother Dee.

In 1974, an eviction for running an "illegal home studio" prompted the Robbs to purchase the former MGM Recording Studios in Los Angeles. The clients of Cherokee Studios included David Bowie, Michael Jackson, Elton John, Bob Dylan, and each one of the Beatles.

== Record production and engineering ==
=== Brothers Robb Production Inc. ===
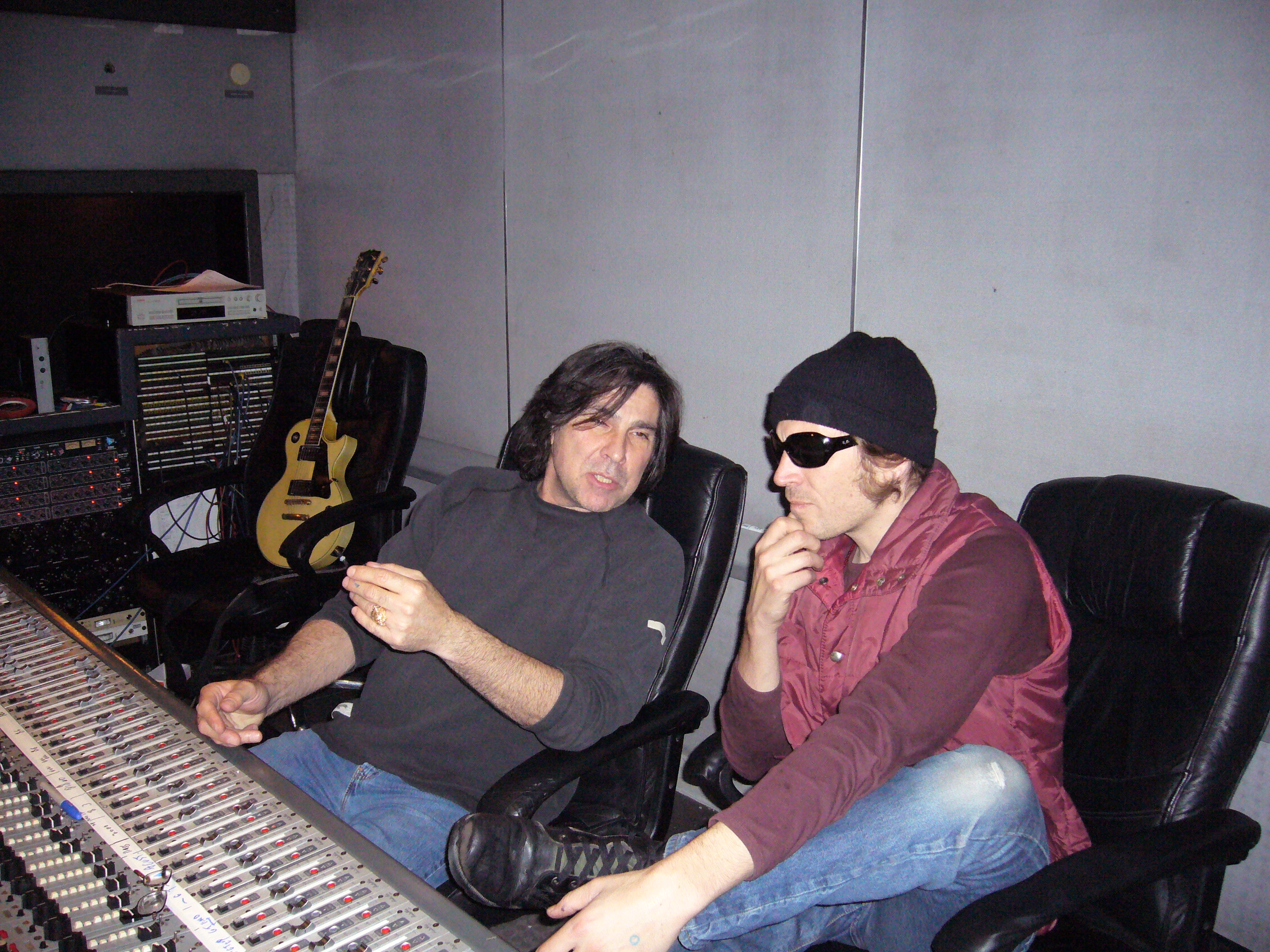
Robb with Evan Dando Cherokee 2006

An A&R rep named Tom Carolan, who had known the Robb brothers for years at Cherokee, brought them their first major record to produce together with a new alternative band he had scouted for Atlantic Records called the Lemonheads. The album It's a Shame About Ray was a commercial success for Evan Dando. The Robbs also did production work for Buffalo Tom and Lita Ford, and then another gold record for The Lemonheads with Come on Feel the Lemonheads. During pre-production of the all female Japanese pop-punk band Shonen Knife, Dee Robb was diagnosed with cancer. Bruce and Joe completed the album as "The Brothers Robb," and then shifted focus back to their individual careers. After several years of treatment, Dee returned to the studio and the brothers joined one more time for Ronnie Laws' Everlasting. Although the production charted, their individual producing schedules rarely aligned again. (The partnership ended with Dee's sudden passing in 2008.)

=== Production work with Steve Cropper ===
Bruce Robb collaborated with Steve Cropper on a record for John Cougar Mellencamp. They also worked on recordings for Levon Helm (of the Band), Harry Nilsson and Robben Ford while Cropper made Cherokee his permanent home. The production duo also contributed to Justine Bateman's and Julia Roberts' singing debut in the film Satisfaction. Cropper's membership in the Blues Brothers fostered creative relationships with Dan Aykroyd and John Belushi for their movies, such as Dragnet, The Great Outdoors, and the title track by Fear for Neighbors. They also produced two full-length albums for Cropper as well.

== Film and television ==
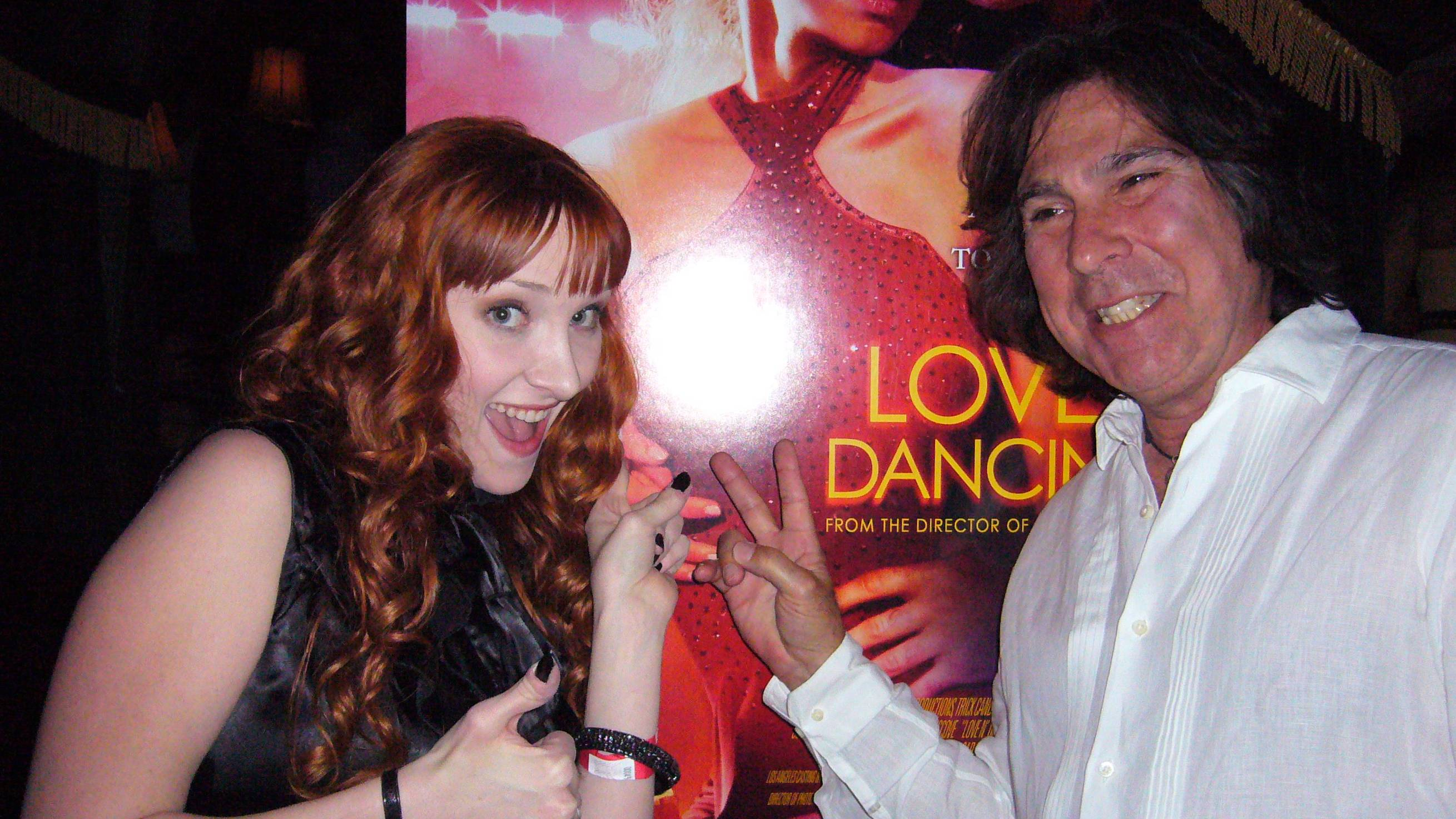
With Scarlett Pomers Premiere 2009

Bruce Robb was uncredited on his first movie soundtrack in the 1970s alongside Flo and Eddie of the Turtles when they produced an original score for a racy Roger Corman produced flick, Dirty Duck. He later also worked with director David Lynch, produced Shelley Duvall and Robin Williams singing showtunes for Robert Altman's Popeye, and recorded a full orchestra in the scoring of Twins. He has also been credited as a producer alongside music supervisor Evyen Klean, with whom he collaborated for HBO's Lackawanna Blues. Robb also worked on the Amy Smart vehicle Love N' Dancing, for which he is listed as the music supervisor-producer and soundtrack producer, with other varied music credits (producer, engineer, arranger, mixing, performer, composer) on over 30 original songs recorded for the film's dance choreography.

=== Work with John Carpenter ===
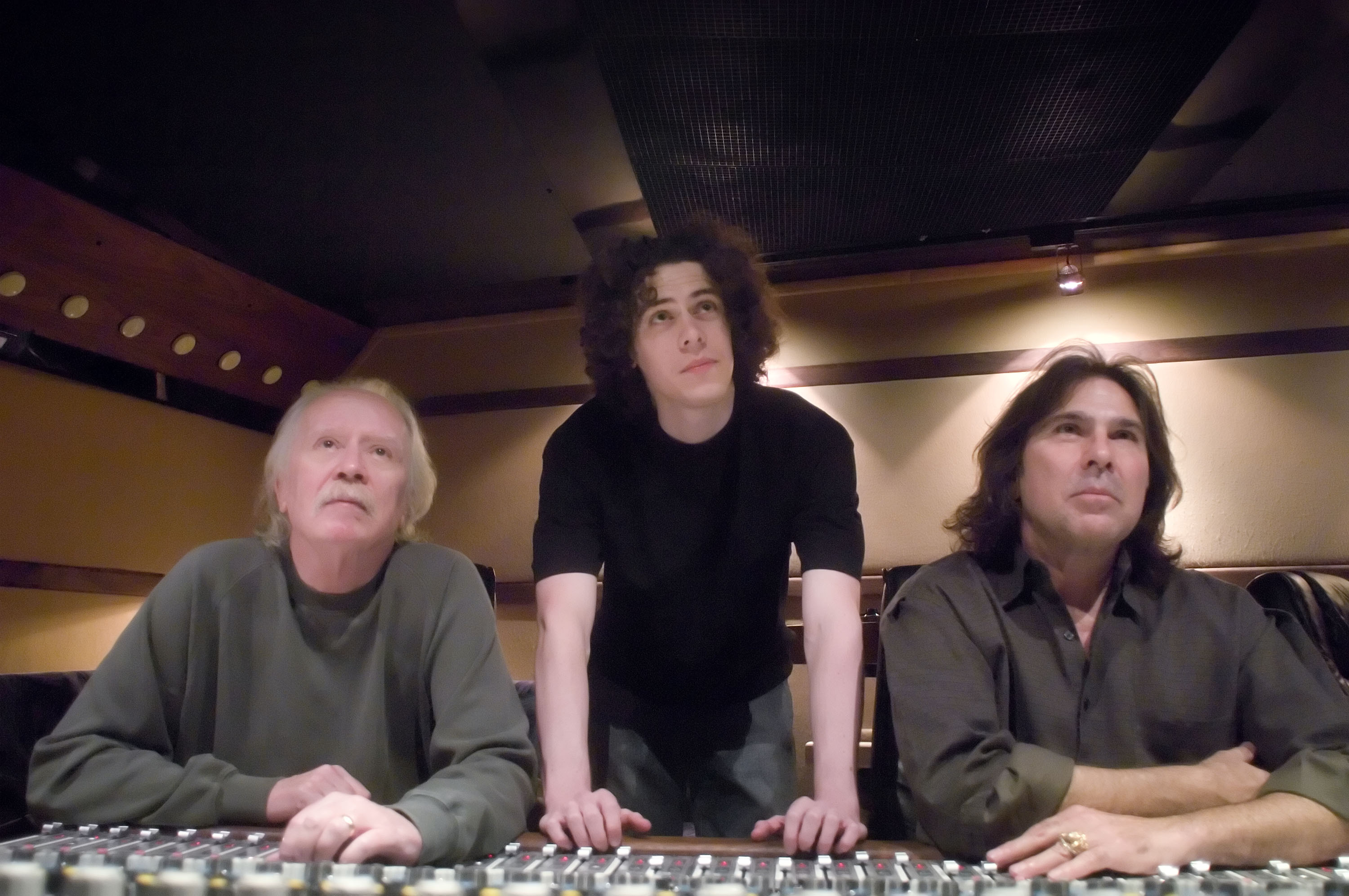
With John & Cody Carpenter Cherokee 2005

The sci-fi/horror director and composer John Carpenter first hired Robb to produce the soundtrack for Village of the Damned. "Bruce Robb guided our compositions, molded them, shaped them, and when they came out of the speakers they were transformed into one of the most full, most romantic scores I've ever done," says Carpenter on his official website for the Village soundtrack. Their collaboration on Vampire$, which won a Saturn Award for Best Music from the Academy of Science Fiction, Fantasy & Horror Films, and Ghosts of Mars, for which Robb produced the original heavy metal score performed by Anthrax with Steve Vai, Robin Finck, and Buckethead.

== Touring years ==
=== "The Robbs" ===
Bruce Robb first gained exposure in the music industry as a member of the Robbs. The 1960s folk rock band was composed of brothers Dee Robb (lead vocals, guitar), Joe Robb (sax, vocals), Bruce Robb (Hammond B3, vocals) and "cousin" Craig "Robb" Krampf (drums, vocals). After some regional touring success, The Robbs were discovered by Dick Clark while performing at his Teen World's Fair at the International Amphitheatre in Chicago. Clark invited the band to guest on his hit music television show, Where The Action Is. Fan reaction to the Robb's first TV appearance resulted in the band extending their stay to become series regulars for the final year of the series in 1967. During that same year, the band became one of the three house bands (with the Doors and the Chambers Brothers) at The Whisky on Sunset. The daily TV exposure catapulted the band to a brief celebrity period with heavy coverage in the major teen magazines alongside major groups like the Beatles, the Monkees, and the Kinks. Over the course of their performing years, the Robbs were recorded on Chess, Argo, RCA, Mercury, Atlantic and ABC/Dunhill record labels, and toured with major acts like Jerry Lee Lewis, the Byrds, the Turtles, Buffalo Springfield, and the Beach Boys. The Robbs released a total of two full-length albums and a number of singles with mostly "bubbling under" appearances on the charts. The band never officially "broke up," but rather got distracted by the spontaneous success of their own studio during the production of their third album (never released).

=== The Robbs produce Summerfest ===
In 1968, the new arts festival conceived by Milwaukee's then-mayor Henry W. Maier was in the final planning stages, with music noticeably absent. At the urging of business leaders who wanted to attract the youth, the Mayor's office was prompted to contact a Wisconsin native band for help. With a TV show and heavy touring schedule at the time, the Robbs were one of the most successful bands to come from the Milwaukee area. They agreed to headline and produce a music counterpart to the event. But, the Robbs insisted on expanding the city's vision from small concerts on plywood staging at the lakefront, to a giant circus big top with professional sound and lighting and a 3,000-seat capacity. Beginning July 20, Summerfest's inaugural eight-day concert series stole the spotlight with sold-out daily matinee and evening performances. The Robbs, who were the backup band for other acts throughout the run, were joined onstage by: Ronnie Dove, Freddie Cannon, the Esquires, the New Colony Six, Eric and Errol, the Lemon Pipers, the Next Five, the Destinations, the Messengers, the Picture and the Wet Wild and Away Dancers. Teenage pandemonium far surpassed the conservative city's expectations requiring additional security, but ultimately drawing the highest attendance of all the events of Summerfest.

The success of the music series attracted many major artists from the Doors, the Beach Boys, and Bob Dylan, to Sting, Metallica, and Prince. After years of planning for Summerfest, the last minute music event launched what has grown to become "The World's Largest Music Festival" (certified by Guinness World Records in 1999) attracting up to 1 million people today.

== Companies ==
=== Quarter 2 Three Records ===
Quarter 2 Three Records is Robb's indie record label. Artists include: blues and classic R&B artist Robert Bradley's Blackwater Surprise, hip hop group JustMATTER, and new artists in development. Recent label releases include: "Out of the Wilderness" by Robert Bradley's Blackwater Surprise and the original soundtrack for the motion picture "Love N' Dancing" by Various Artists.

=== Bruce Robb Productions ===
In addition to record production, Bruce Robb Productions focuses on original music production and music supervision services for the film, television and commercial industries. Robb's production company handled all of the music department tasks for the Amy Smart dance movie "Love N' Dancing" which was released in 2009. BRP delivered over 30 original songs created for specific dance choreography, with Robb as the lead music producer/composer/supervisor for the film's original score and soundtrack.

=== A&R Studio Design + Construction ===
A&R Studio Design + Construction is a firm specializing in professional studio builds for the entertainment, broadcast and recording industries. A&R is: acoustic architect George Augspurger, former News Corp./Fox Studio's Project Manager John ANDerson and Robb.

== List of albums produced, engineered, mixed by Robb ==
Artist	Album	Credits
Robert Bradley's Blackwater Surprise	Out of the Wilderness	Producer/Engineer/Mixing/Hammond B3
Robert Bradley's Blackwater Surprise	Still Lovin' You	Producer/Engineer/Mixing/Hammond B3
David Jaurequi	Fox Bat Strategy: A Tribute to Dave Jaurequi	Engineer/Mixing
Donovan	Lady of the Stars	Producer, engineer, organ
Shelby Lynne	Just Because I'm a Woman The Songs of Dolly Parton	Producer/Engineer/Mixing
Shelby Lynne	Identity Crisis	Producer/Engineer/Mixing
Shelby Lynne	Definitive Collection	Producer/Engineer/Mixing
Various Artists	Rise Above: 24 Black Flag Songs to Benefit the West Memphis Three	Engineer
The Lemonheads	Come on Feel the Lemonheads	Producer/Engineer/Mixing/B3
The Lemonheads	It's a Shame About Ray & Collector Edition	Producer/Engineer/Mixing/B3
Cher	Heart of Stone	Engineer
Cher	Chronicles	Engineer
Ronnie Laws	Everlasting	Producer/Engineer/Mixing/B3
Selena	Dreaming of You	Engineer/Mixing
Rickie Lee Jones	Flying Cowboys	Engineer
John Cougar Mellencamp	Words & Music: John Mellencamp's Greatest Hits	Producer/Engineer/Mixing
John Cougar Mellencamp	The Best That I Could Do 1978–1988	Producer/Engineer/Mixing
John Cougar Mellencamp	Nothin' Matters and What If It Did	Producer/Engineer/Mixing
Dr. John	Mos' Scocious: Anthology	Engineer/Mixing
Burton Cummings	Dream of a Child	Producer/Engineer/Mixing
Burton Cummings	Woman Love	Producer/Engineer/Mixing
Burton Cummings	Sweet Sweet	Producer/Engineer/Mixing
Burton Cummings	Heart	Producer/Engineer/Mixing
Burton Cummings	Collection	Producer/Engineer/Mixing
Buffalo Tom	Big Red Letter Day	Producer/Engineer/Mixing/B3
Soul Asylum	Grave Dancers Union	Engineer/Mixing
Warpipes	Holes in the Heavens	Engineer
Flo & Eddie	Best of Flo & Eddie	Engineer/Mixing/B3/Piano/BG vocals
Barbra Streisand	The Broadway Album	Engineer
Barry Manilow	Manilow	Engineer/Mixing
Steve Cropper	Playing My Thang	Producer/Engineer/Mixing
Steve Cropper	Night After Night	Producer/Engineer/Mixing
Ringo Starr	Stop and Smell the Roses	Engineer/Mixing
Levon Helm	Levon Helm 1978	Engineer/Mixing
Levon Helm	Levon Helm 1982	Engineer/Mixing
Harry Nilsson	Flash Harry	Producer/Engineer/Mixing
Billy Vera & the Beaters	The Best of Billy Vera & The Beaters	Engineer/Mixing
Billy Vera & the Beaters	By Request	Engineer/Mixing
Etta James	Deep in the Night	Engineer/Mixing
Art Garfunkel	Watermark	Engineer/Mixing
Jean-Luc Ponty	Mystical Adventures	Engineer
Tower of Power	We Came To Play	Engineer
Robben Ford	The Inside Story	Engineer/Mixing
Bob Crewe	Motivation	Engineer/Mixing
Livingston Taylor	Man's Best Friend	Engineer/Mixing
Maria Muldaur	Open Your Eyes	Engineer/Mixing
Nazareth	Malice in Wonderland	Engineer/Mixing
Jewel	First Studio Recording	Producer/Engineer/Mixing
The Robbs	The Robbs	B3, Piano, Background Vocals
The Robbs	Cherokee	B3, Piano, Background Vocals

== List of films and television shows with music credits for Robb ==
Film/TV	Credits
Love N' Dancing	Music Supervisor Producer/Engineer/5.1 Mixing Composer/Arranger/Contractor B3/synthesizer/Wurlitzer/Piano/vibes/percussion/ BG vocals Over 30 orig. custom songs
The Story of Hudson Hawk	Engineer, Bruce Willis & Robert Kraft piano interview
Masters of Horror: John Carpenter's Cigarette Burns	Music Supervisor Producer/Engineer/Mixing
Lackawanna Blues	Producer/Engineer/Mixing Arranger/Contractor B3/Wurlitzer Orig. prods. w/Mos Def, Macy Gray, Robert Bradley
Just Friends	Producer/Engineer/Mixing "Into Your Arms" (The Lemonheads)
Punch-Drunk Love	Producer/Engineer/Mixing
Run Ronnie Run!	Producer/Engineer/Mixing "Ass Kickin' Fat Kid" theme song w/Scott Ian (Anthrax) & Samantha Maloney (Hole)
Ghosts of Mars	Music Supervisor Producer/Engineer/5.1 Mixing Fender Rhodes Carpenter's score w/Anthrax, Steve Vai, Buckethead, Elliot Easton, Robin Finck
The Other Sister	Engineer/Mixing "Mrs. Robinson" (The Lemonheads)
Don Juan DeMarco	Engineer/Mixing Orig. prods. w/Selena, Sol de Mexico (incls. Sp. vers. Bryan Adam's theme)
John Carpenter's Vampires	Music Supervisor Producer/Engineer/5.1 Mixing Arranger/Contractor B3/percussion Carpenter's score w/Steve Cropper, Duck Dunn, Jeff Baxter
The Experts	Engineer/5.1 Mixing "Back in the USSR" remake
Twins	Engineer/5.1 Mixing Orig. score prod w/composer Randy Edelman
The Great Outdoors	Engineer/5.1 Mixing "Land of a Thousand Dances" remake w/ Wilson Pickett & The Elwood Blues Revue "Hot Fun in the Summertime" remake w/The Elwood Blues Revue & Sam Moore
Satisfaction	Engineer/Mixing Orig. soundtrack w/Justine Bateman, Julia Roberts, Steve Cropper, Duck Dunn & James Burton
Innerspace	Producer/Engineer/Mixing "Twistin' the Night Away" w/Rod Stewart end titles theme
Dragnet	Engineer, Mixing "Just the Facts" theme & other songs w/Dan Akroyd
Melanie	Producer/Engineer/Mixing "You Saved My Soul" theme & other songs w/Burton Cummings
Neighbors	Producer/Engineer/Mixing End title theme w/Fear (Belushi's pick, but rejected)
Popeye	Producer/Engineer/Mixing Orig. Harry Nilsson songs w/Shelley Duvall, Robin Williams
Down and Dirty Duck	Engineer, Mixing B3, Wurlitzer, piano, BG vocals Orig. soundtrack w/Flo & Eddie (The Turtles)
Charmed	Engineer/Mixing Orig. theme song w/Liz Phair & Angelo Badalamenti
Crime Story	Producer/Engineer/Mixing Series theme song remake of "Runaway" w/Del Shannon
The Nutcracker: A Fantasy on Ice	Engineer/Mixing Lorne Greene's narration
The George Burns Special	Live Broadcast Engineer/Mixer
