= Pilars de Pilar =

The Pilars de Pilar family is a Polish noble family of Spanish origin. In 1915, they were granted the title of Baron in the Russian Empire by Nicholas II.

== Notable members ==
- Antonia Pilars de Pilar (1872–1946), a court lady of the duchess of Mecklenburg-Schwerin
- Ladislaus Pilars de Pilar (1874–1952), a Polish poet and entrepreneur
- Juan Pilars († 1521 in Cagliari), an Italian bishop
- Carol Pilars de Pilar (b. 6 August 1961), German artist
