= Carolan =

Carolan may refer to:

== Places ==
- Carolan, Arkansas

== People ==
- Turlough O'Carolan (1670–1738), Irish harper and composer
- Carolan (surname)

== Food and drink ==
- Carolans, a liqueur based on Irish whiskey

== See also ==
- Carol Ann
