= The Princess and the Unicorn =

2009 novel by Carol Hughes

- First edition cover
- Author: Carol Hughes
- Language: English
- Genre: Fantasy
- Published: 2009 by Random House
- Publication place: United States
- Pages: 275
- ISBN: 978-0375855627
- OCLC: 213479864

The Princess and the Unicorn is a children's fantasy novel by British-born American author Carol Hughes, who also wrote Jack Black and the Ship of Thieves. The novel was published in hardcover on February 24, 2009, by Random House Books for Young Readers.

== Plot summary ==
This novel follows two characters: Princess Eleanor of England and a young fairy named Joyce. Joyce lives in Swinley Forest with a community of other fairies who rely on the forest's unicorn for survival. One day, Joyce follows the unicorn to the edge of the forest and is spotted by Princess Eleanor. The princess chases her inside and finds the unicorn, only to take it home with her to Swinley Castle. Knowing it is her responsibility to retrieve the unicorn, Joyce sets out on a journey to bring the unicorn home. Things get a little more complicated when the Princess takes the unicorn with her to London.

Meanwhile, the princess rarely gets to see her parents, who are too busy to tuck her into bed at night, and her once lovable nanny is creating a deceptive get-rich-quick scheme behind Eleanor's back.
