= Carolean =

Carolean can refer to:

- Carolean era, the period noted for the flourishing of the arts following the demise of the spartan Protectorate
  - Restoration style, a decorative style popular in England from 1660 to the 1680s
- Caroleans, soldiers of the Swedish kings Charles XI and Charles XII
- Carolean Express, train service in the United Kingdom

== See also ==
- Carolan (surname)
- Carole Ann
