= Ladislaus Pilars de Pilar =

Polish writer

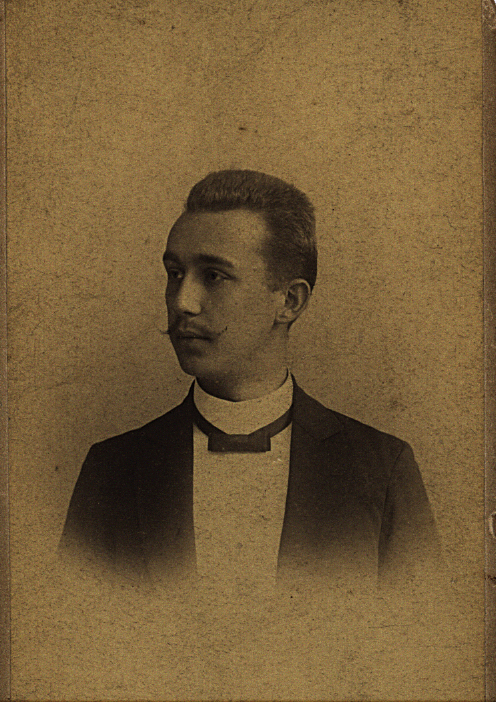
Ladislaus Pilars de Pilar, 1898

Ladislaus Baron Pilars de Pilar (Polish: Władysław Pilars de Pilar, Opatówek, 3 March 1874 - Chorzów, 22 November 1952) was a Polish poet, historian, entrepreneur and a literature professor at the University of Warsaw.

== Biography ==
He was a son of Edward Gustaw Pilars (born in Opatówek in 1834, died in 1905), an accountant in Adolf Gottlieb Fiedler's cloth factory, and Ewa Grzankowska. He was member of Pilar de Pilars family of Spanish origin, from Zaragoza. Ladislaus married Antonia Freiin von Oer (1872–1946), who was a court lady of the princess of Mecklenburg - Antoinette, Tsar Nicholas II's cousin. Antonia Oer's father, Friedrich Reichsfreiherr von Oer, was chamberlain of prince Charles II. Isenburg-Birstein (1838–1899). Ladislaus and Antonia had three children: Eduard, Antoinette and Gabriel. His son Gabriel married 1935 Anna Herrin und Gräfin von Stubenberg.

Ladislaus Baron Pilars de Pilar graduated in engineering in Berlin and was also running a factory for safes in Warsaw. He was a literature professor at the Warsaw University and the vice-president of the Poetry Association and the vice-president of the Shakespeare Association in Poland.

He was a poet, the author of Tragedia ("The Tragedy"), a hexametric poem dedicated to Napoleon Bonaparte, the French Emperor. The book, illustrated by Zygmunt Grabowski, was published in 1927. The poem was also translated into English, French and German. Other pieces by Ladislaus Pilars de Pilar include Symfonia Bałtyku ("The Baltic Symphony"), a poem written in Polish, French and English.

After his factory in Warsaw was burned by revolutionists in 1906, his family moved to the German Empire. However, Władysław stayed in Congress Poland. He passed his youth and his early years in Opatówek and moved then to Struga Street in Warsaw. He eventually died on 22 November 1952 in Chorzów.
