= Robert Bradley's Blackwater Surprise =

Background information
- Origin: Detroit, Michigan, United States
- Genres: Soul; rock; R&B; blues
- Years active: 1994–2009

Robert Bradley's Blackwater Surprise (RBBS) was an American band from Detroit, Michigan. The group was a collaboration between Robert Bradley and three other rock musicians.

== History ==
The band was formed in 1994 when former members of the band Second Self met Bradley, a blind street performer. Bradley was born in Alabama, and gained musical experience by singing as a child at The Alabama School for the Blind. He had been in Detroit for several years by 1994, occasionally playing music on the streets, and playing on Saturdays in Detroit's Eastern Market, when guitarist Michael Nehra, his brother and bassist Andrew Nehra, and drummer Jeff Fowlkes overheard Bradley through an open window while rehearsing for a new project. After listening to Bradley sing for an hour, they invited him up to Nehra's studio, The White Room, to record several acoustic songs, and then asked him to become their vocalist.

On September 17, 1996, RBBS released their 11-track debut. The result was marked as "an effective collaboration between a blind blues musician and a sympathetic Detroit rock trio." The album was produced by Michael and Andrew Nehra, and engineered and mixed by Michael Nehra. It was followed by a live EP in 1999 and a follow-up studio album, Time to Discover, in 2000. This album featured guest vocals by Kid Rock. Allmusic reviewer Mark Morgenstein praised Time to Discover as "the first modern blues classic of the new millennium." The album was produced by both Michael and Andrew Nehra, and engineered and mixed by Michael Nehra. Their next album, 2002's New Ground, was noted as "earnest... exuding a hard-won optimism and working-man's head-down forbearance." It peaked at #38 on Billboard's Top Independent Albums chart. It was quickly followed by Still Lovin' You in 2003, also released on Vanguard Records and produced, engineered, and mixed by Cherokee Studios co-founder Bruce Robb.

The group's next release was What About That: New Year's Eve in Bloomington (2006), a two-disc live album documenting the singer's once-annual New Year's stops at the Bluebird nightclub in Bloomington, Indiana. Produced by filmmaker/photographer/journalist Wes Orshoski, it features 22 songs, including four acoustic tracks recorded at soundcheck, an acoustic version of "Once Upon a Time," then-new songs "New Orleans" and "What About the Man," and an a cappella rendition of "Will the Circle Be Unbroken". Five years after their previous studio record, Robert Bradley's Blackwater Surprise released Out of the Wilderness in 2008. The songs "Love You in the Daytime," "Cryin’ My Eyes Out," and "Everybody Wanna Party" are featured in the motion picture Love N’ Dancing, starring Amy Smart and Billy Zane. Bruce Robb returned as producer, engineer, and mixer.

== Post-breakup ==
After the release of Out of the Wilderness, Robert Bradley moved back to Alabama, where he quit performing professionally, though he still sang and played in church services. He ran a vending machine supply business until a back injury made the work too difficult to continue. In 2016, he returned to Detroit and started busking again, which helped him reinvigorate his songwriting; as a result, he released a solo album, Down in the Bend, on Funky D Records in 2017. Jeff Fowlkes joined Too Slim and the Taildraggers in the mid-2010s. Mike and Andrew Nehra had founded audio equipment company Vintage King Engineering in 1993, and both continued their involvement with the company into the 2010s.

== Discography ==
Albums

- Blackwater Surprise (RCA, 1996)
- Authorized Bootleg: Live (RCA, 1997) - limited edition CD featuring four live tracks
- Live (RCA, 1999)
- Time to Discover (RCA, 2000)
- New Ground (Vanguard, 2002)
- Still Lovin' You (Vanguard, 2003)
- What About That: New Year's Eve in Bloomington (Kufala, 2006)
- Out of the Wilderness (2008)

Compilation appearances

- Believing in Detroit: A Tribute to Vladdy and Sergei (JFW, 1998) - a limited-edition compilation, original recording, featuring "Shake It Off"
- KBCO Studio C Volume 12 Compilation Live In KBCO (KBCO, 2000) - recorded at a Boulder, Colorado radio studio, featuring "Baby", recorded live
- KFOG Live from the Archives 8 (KFOG, 2001) - live, limited-edition compilation, featuring "Baby", recorded live in studio
- Wish You a Merry Christmas (2001) - limited collector's edition, rare three-track CD single
- Monitor This February/March 2002 (2002) - compilation featuring "Train"
- It'll Come to You - The Songs of John Hiatt (Vanguard, 2003) - compilation featuring "It'll Come to You"
- Relix Magazine Music Sampler July 2006 (Relix, 2006) - an import compilation featuring "Once Upon a Time"
- Lackawanna Blues Soundtrack (HBO Films/Vanguard, 2004) - produced by Bruce Robb, featuring Robert Bradley's "Dark Road," "Something Inside Me," and "Down on Me", a duet with Macy Gray
