= Cherokee Studios =

American recording facility

Coordinates: 34.0852403°N 118.3617293°W

- Industry: Recording studio
- Founded: 1972; 54 years ago in Los Angeles, U.S.
- Founders: Bruce Robb, Dee Robb, Joe Robb
- Headquarters: Los Angeles, U.S.
- Number of locations: 1
- Website: cherokeestudios.com

Cherokee Studios is a recording studio facility in Hollywood, Los Angeles, founded in 1972 by members of 1960s pop band the Robbs. Cherokee has been the location of many notable recordings by such artists as Pat Benatar, David Bowie, the Cars, Devo, Dokken, Melissa Etheridge, Foreigner, Guns N' Roses, Hall and Oates, Michael Jackson, Journey, John Mellencamp, Mötley Crüe, Tom Petty and the Heartbreakers, Queens of the Stone Age, Bonnie Raitt, the Replacements, Steely Dan, Rod Stewart, Toto, Van Halen, X, "Weird Al" Yankovic and The Firesign Theatre.

At the peak of its success, Cherokee operated eight studios in two locations. In his autobiography, Beatles producer George Martin dubbed Cherokee Studios the best studio in America.

== History ==
=== Background ===
The studio was founded by members of the Robbs, an American pop band from Oconomowoc, Wisconsin, centered on three brothers who all adopted pseudonyms: Robert Donaldson ("Bruce Robb"), George Donaldson ("Joe Robb"), David Donaldson ("Dee Robb"), and family friend Craig Krampf ("Craig Robb"). Dick Clark discovered the band in 1962 when they were the opening act at the "Summer Caravan of Stars" in Wisconsin and invited them to continue on with the "Caravan" tour as essentially the house band. At the 1964 "Young World's Fair" in Chicago, the band won Clark's "Battle of the Bands". The band was signed to Mercury Records in 1966, and moved to California to appear as regular performers on Clark's show Where the Action Is.

By 1969 the band, now signed to ABC/Dunhill, had changed their sound to a more country rock orientation and changed its name to Cherokee. ABC/Dunhill's studios were booked solid at the time, and the studio's chief technical engineer, Roger Nichols, was spending a lot of time at the band's ranch in rural Chatsworth. Nichols suggested the band buy some recording gear and set it up in the barn. Eventually, the band evolved from recording their own music to producing and engineering for other artists, including longtime friend Del Shannon and Steely Dan, who recorded overdubs for and mixed their 1974 album Pretzel Logic at "Cherokee's Ranch". The studio recorded the first demos by the Van Halen lineup of David Lee Roth, Eddie Van Halen, Alex Van Halen, and Michael Anthony. After being threatened to be evicted for running an "illegal home studio", the studio's owners began looking for a bigger facility.

=== Fairfax Avenue ===
In January 1975, Cherokee purchased the former location of MGM Studios at 751 N. Fairfax Avenue in Hollywood, including its large 35-by-58-foot live room (known as "Frank Sinatra's string room") and five isolation booths. The brothers hired Trident Studios to build a custom 80-input A-Range mixing console, one of the first in the United States. Meant to be a creative space for musicians and engineers, the studio featured five live rooms, 24-track mixing consoles, 24-hour session times, and a lounge bar. It quickly became one of the city's busiest studios, attracting notable artists such as David Bowie, Frank Sinatra, and Rod Stewart.

Cherokee's Fairfax Avenue location closed on August 31, 2007. The last album recorded at that location was the Robert Bradley's Blackwater Surprise album Out of the Wilderness (2008). The studio closed to make way for a new building. Under the direction of a leading green developer, the site was to become the Lofts @ Cherokee Studios – a Green LEED Platinum Live/Work complex offering professional recording studios in select units designed by Cherokee owner Bruce Robb, but those plans did not come to fruition. The original developers went into foreclosure in 2008. New owners purchased the property and have had no contact or relationship with Bruce Robb and or Cherokee Studios.

=== Melrose Avenue ===
In late August 2011, Cherokee Studio's website announced "New Studio Coming to Hollywood", and in 2020 Cherokee Studios opened a recording studio on Melrose Avenue across the street from Paramount Film Studios. Built with George Augsberger and Bruce Robb, the new studio features Cherokee Studio's original Trident A-Range 48-channel, 24-bus, 24-monitor channel mixing console, and a large tracking space that can hold up to 40 string players comfortably.

== Prominent clients ==
Under MGM Records

Acts that recorded at M.G.M. Recording Studios include: Count Basie, Ella Fitzgerald, Judy Garland, Oscar Peterson, Lou Rawls, the Sylvers, Elvis Presley and the Nelson Riddle Orchestra.

=== Tom Petty ===
Petty recorded his third album Damn the Torpedoes and fourth Hard Promises at both Sound City Studios and Cherokee Studios respectively. During the recording of Hard Promises, John Lennon was scheduled to be in the recording studio at the same time as Petty and the Heartbreakers. However, the meeting never occurred due to the murder of Lennon in New York in December 1980. Both Damn the Torpedoes and Hard Promises were mixed at Cherokee Studios.

=== David Bowie ===
English musician David Bowie recorded his tenth studio album Station to Station at Cherokee in late 1975. Co-produced by Harry Maslin, it was released in January 1976 and was a massive commercial success.

=== Mötley Crüe ===
Mötley Crüe recorded the platinum selling albums Theatre of Pain and Shout at the Devil at Cherokee Studios. Technicians working on Shout at the Devil noted that the members of Mötley Crüe would "stay up for three days straight making music and not even think we were working hard, with girls were streaming in and out of the studio."

=== Harry Nilsson ===
Harry Nilsson recorded his final album Flash Harry at Cherokee Studios between 1978 and 1980. Produced by Steve Cropper and engineered by Bruce Robb, the album has a very clean, soulful sound and features a who's-who of collaborators including Ringo Starr, Paul Stallworth, Eric Idle and Mac Rebennack.

=== Bonnie Raitt ===
While living in one of the West Hollywood apartment complexes directly behind Cherokee Studios, Bonnie Raitt would pick up backup singing recording gigs with music producers Bruce Robb and Steve Cropper.

=== Frank Sinatra ===
Frank Sinatra recorded the Sinatra Christmas Album at Cherokee in 1975.

=== Ringo Starr ===
While he was recording Stop and Smell the Roses at Cherokee Studios in 1980, Ringo Starr invited George Harrison, Paul McCartney and Linda McCartney to guest on the album; Paul McCartney and Harrison also produced some of the tracks. Starr had approached John Lennon to help out as well, had received two demos of songs which eventually wound up on the posthumous Lennon album Milk and Honey, and reportedly, Lennon had agreed to come to Los Angeles in January 1981 and take part in the recording; the album then would have been a modest Beatles reunion. The assassination of Lennon prevented those plans from coming to fruition. Ronnie Wood of the Rolling Stones also collaborated with Starr on the album at Cherokee, adding guitar, bass, saxophone, keyboards, and back-up vocals.

=== Weird Al Yankovic ===
Weird Al Yankovic recorded his first album at Cherokee in 1982. The album sold over 500,000 copies.

=== Warren Zevon ===
In 2002, a terminally ill Warren Zevon came to Cherokee Studios to record what would be his final album, The Wind. Nick Read filmed Zevon's final recordings at Cherokee for the documentary,Warren Zevon: Keep Me In Your Heart. Bruce Springsteen joined Zevon at Cherokee for the single "Disorder in the House", Cherokee owner Bruce Robb provided lead guitar on the first track of The Wind and support vocals on two other tracks.

=== Michael Jackson ===
Michael Jackson's 1979 album Off the Wall was recorded at Cherokee Studios. The album is among the best-selling albums of all time.
