= The Robbs =

American 1960s pop and rock band

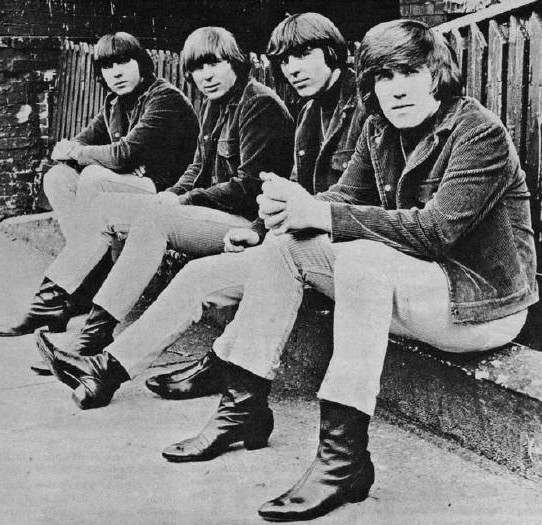

Background information
- Origin: United States
- Genres: Pop, rock
- Label: Mercury Records
- Past members: Bruce Robb, Dee Robb, Joe Robb, Craig Robb

The Robbs were an American 1960s pop and rock band from Oconomowoc, Wisconsin. They are best known for being the house band on Dick Clark's mid-1960s show, Where The Action Is. They are also known for placing the most singles on Billboard magazine's "Bubbling Under" chart (five as The Robbs, plus a final single as Cherokee) without ever once crossing over into the Billboard Hot 100.

== History ==
=== Formation and early years (1960s) ===
The Robbs were centered around a band of brothers, all of whom adopted pseudonyms. The brothers were David Donaldson ("Dee Robb" – lead vocals and guitar), Robert Donaldson ("Bruce Robb" – keyboards and vocals), and George Donaldson ("Joe Robb" – guitar and vocals). The fourth member was family friend Craig Krampf ("Craig Robb" – drums); although some publicity material identified Craig as a "cousin" of the other three members, he was in fact wholly unrelated to the Donaldsons. The band was founded in the early 1960s without Krampf, and recorded as Dee Robb, Robby & The Robbins, and Dee Robb & the Robins before settling on The Robbs and hiring Krampf in 1965.

Musically, the Robbs were noted for their use of harmony vocals, and instrumentation that was inspired by folk-rock, bubblegum music, and jangle pop.

Spotted by Dick Clark, the band was signed to Mercury Records in 1966 and moved to California to appear as regular performers on Where the Action Is during late 1966 and early 1967, replacing Paul Revere and the Raiders.

The band recorded with some regional success between 1966 and 1970, at first for Mercury and subsequently for a variety of record labels. Almost all of their singles charted on radio stations in and around Milwaukee, Wisconsin. As well, their 1966 single "Race With The Wind" was a substantial hit in Chicago, and several other singles were breakout successes in smaller markets such as Honolulu, Hawaii and Columbus, Ohio. An early single was co-written and produced by the team of P.F. Sloan and Steve Barri, who had earlier written a hit single for the (then) strictly studio-concocted band The Grass Roots. Sloan and Barri reportedly offered The Robbs a chance to step in and actually become The Grass Roots for both touring purposes and for future singles, but the group turned the offer down.

The Robbs continued to release singles to regional acclaim, but unlike The Grass Roots (who went on to have over a dozen Hot 100 hits), The Robbs were never able to garner a true nationwide hit, accounting for their inability to break into the Hot 100.

The Robbs' lone album, from 1967, was compiled from the A-sides and B-sides of their 1966 and 1967 singles, along with two new tracks. This self-titled LP made the Billboard 200 chart for one week in January 1968, peaking at No. 200, and the band was shortly thereafter dropped by Mercury Records. (The LP was reissued in mono on CD by Collectors' Choice in 2004.)

Upon signing to Atlantic in 1968, The Robbs pursued a more country-rock orientation. After their two Atlantic singles missed even the "bubbling under" charts, Atlantic let the band go, and they were picked up by ABC/Dunhill in 1969. The Robbs continued to release singles for this label, with the usual regional success and some "bubbling under" appearances, but no national breakthrough.

=== Rebirth as Cherokee ===
In 1971, the group changed their name to Cherokee, and re-emphasized their country rock influenced sound. The four band members also reverted to their birth names for their work with this band. They released one self-titled studio album as Cherokee, as well as the 1971 non-LP single "Girl, I've Got News for You". Both the album and the single featured the participation of Chris Hillman of the Byrds. However, the album did not chart, nor did the album's lead single "Rosianna".

The follow-up single ("Girl, I've Got News for You") charted in the top 40 on radio stations in at least six U.S. states as well as in Kingston, Ontario, Canada. However, as had happened with numerous singles credited to The Robbs, nationally the single only appeared on Billboard's "Bubbling Under" chart, as well as the equivalent charts in Cash Box and Record World.

=== Dissolution, and formation of Cherokee Studios ===
Cherokee had set up their own recording studio in a rural California barn to record their material, and they soon started recording other acts there as well. Artists such as Del Shannon and Zane Ashton recorded there. According to Dee Robb, although his band would never record or perform again after 1971 (as either The Robbs or Cherokee), they never officially broke up. Instead, they simply started spending so much time operating their studio that the band was put on hold—as it turned out, permanently.

In 1975, the three Robb Brothers (who had gone back to using their "Robbs" names) opened Cherokee Studios in Los Angeles. This studio became one of America's premier recording facilities whose clients included The Go-Go's (including Jane Wiedlin, who was also born in Oconomowoc), Jane's Addiction, Steely Dan, Aerosmith, Devo, Public Enemy, Lenny Kravitz, John Cougar, Al Green, Warren Zevon, Sneaker and many others. Through their association with Cherokee Studios, the Robb brothers have participated in the creation of more than 250 gold or platinum records.

Under his real name, Robbs' drummer Craig Krampf also found success in the music industry, becoming a respected session drummer, songwriter and record producer. His drumming can be heard on (among many other songs) the Kim Carnes No. 1 hit "Bette Davis Eyes"; as a writer, his biggest hit was Steve Perry's 1984 hit "Oh Sherrie" (a co-write with three others); and as a producer, his most notable credit is his co-production of the first album by Melissa Etheridge.

Dee Robb, The Robbs' vocalist and chief songwriter (and oldest sibling) died in 2008.

== Discography ==
=== Albums ===
- The Robbs (Mercury, 1967) – US No. 200

=== EP ===
- W'RIT in Milwaukee Radio! (1968, with the Tygers and the Skunks) – "You Got Your Troubles" & "Louie Louie"

=== Singles ===
Includes information on local markets in which The Robbs made the Top 40. In order to qualify, at least one radio station in the market had to place the relevant 45 on their published weekly chart, at position No. 40 or higher. Local charts compiled by ARSA:

Release date	Title	Charts (Note: The Robbs never charted nationally in Canada on RPM's Top 100, or the CHUM chart.)		
Release date	Title	US Billboard	US Cashbox	Charted Top 40 in the following markets:
1964	"Surfer's Life" (as Robby & the Robbins)	—	—	—
1966	"Race With The Wind"	103	101	New Smyrna Beach, Florida; Chicago, Illinois; Duluth, Minnesota, Dallas, Texas; Milwaukee, Wisconsin; Regina, Saskatchewan (Canada).
1966	"Next Time You See Me"	—	—	Los Angeles; Salt Lake City, Utah
1966	"Bittersweet"	—	133	Hartford, Connecticut; Honolulu, Hawaii; Davenport, Iowa; Louisville, Kentucky; Lansing, Michigan; McAllen, Texas, San Antonio, Texas; Fond du Lac, Wisconsin; Milwaukee, Wisconsin; Stevens Point, Wisconsin.
1967	"Rapid Transit"	123	125	Louisville, Kentucky; San Antonio, Texas; Green Bay, Wisconsin; Manitowoc, Wisconsin; Milwaukee, Wisconsin.
1967	"Cynthia Loves" (B-side to "Rapid Transit")	—	—	Milwaukee, Wisconsin; Oshkosh, Wisconsin; Stevens Point, Wisconsin.
1967	"Girls, Girls"	—	—	Appleton, Wisconsin; Columbus, Ohio; Green Bay, Wisconsin; Stevens Point, Wisconsin.
1967	"Violets Of Dawn" (B-side to "Girls, Girls")	—	—	Appleton, Wisconsin; Green Bay, Wisconsin.
1968	"I Don't Want To Discuss It"	—	—	Columbus, Ohio; Madison, Wisconsin; Milwaukee, Wisconsin
1968	"Changin' Winds"	—	—	Columbus, Ohio: Milwaukee, Wisconsin; Stevens Point, Wisconsin.
1969	"Movin'"	131	—	Columbus, Ohio: Stevens Point, Wisconsin; Oshkosh, Wisconsin.
1970	"Last Of The Wine"	114	112	St. Louis, Missouri; Cincinnati, Ohio; Youngstown, Ohio; Erie, Pennsylvania; Milwaukee, Wisconsin; Hamilton, Ontario (Canada).
1970	"I'll Never Get Enough"	106	—	Swift Current, Saskatchewan (Canada).
1971	"Rosianna" (as Cherokee)	—	—	
1971	"Girl, I've Got News for You" (as Cherokee)	116	—	Minneapolis, Minnesota; Providence, Rhode Island; Spokane, Washington; Kimberly, Wisconsin; Youngstown, Ohio; Lewisburg, Pennsylvania; Kingston, Ontario (Canada).
