= Robert F. Carolan =

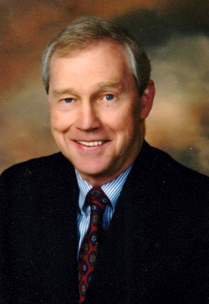
- Robert F. Carolan

Judge of the Constitutional Court of Kosovo
- In office June 26, 2009 – June 26, 2015
- Nominated by: International Seat

Personal details
- Born: March 27, 1945 (age 81) Decorah, Iowa, U.S.
- Education: Saint Mary's University of Minnesota (BA); University of Iowa (JD)
- Profession: Judge
- Nickname: Bob

Robert F. Carolan (born March 27, 1945) is an international judge of the Constitutional Court of Kosovo.

== Education and experience ==
Carolan graduated from St. Mary's University, Winona, Minnesota, United States, in 1967 with a Bachelor of Arts degree and earned a Juris Doctor degree in 1970 from the University of Iowa, College of Law, Iowa City, Iowa.

== Legal career ==
Before his appointment as a jurist, Carolan served as an attorney in the Office of the State Attorney General of Minnesota from 1970 to 1974, and as an Assistant Dakota County Attorney from 1974 to 1979. In 1979, Carolan was appointed and subsequently elected to the office of Dakota. County Attorney, Hastings, Minnesota, serving in that office from 1979 to 1987.

In 1987, Carolan was appointed by Minnesota Governor Rudy Perpich to serve as a judge for the Minnesota District Court of the First Judicial District.

He was an adjunct professor at William Mitchell College of Law, St. Paul, Minnesota, from 1990 to 2001.

The United Nations Interim Administration Mission in Kosovo appointed Carolan in 2002, to serve as an international judge in Kosovo and in 2004 appointed him to serve as Chairperson of the Kosovo Judicial Council.

Carolan also lectured in 2007 at the War Crimes Symposium Judge sponsored by the College of Law of the University of Iowa.

The High Judicial Council of Bosnia and Herzegovina appointed Carolan to serve as an International Judge (Appellate Court, War Crimes Chamber) of the Court of Bosnia and Herzegovina (January 2008 - January 2009).

He has conducted numerous trial skills and management courses for practicing lawyers and judges in Minnesota and Kosovo.

Carolan has published an article entitled, "The Role of Hybrid International Courts in Prosecuting War Crimes and Developing Independent Domestic Court Systems: The Kosovo Experiment," Transnational Law and Contemporary Problems, Vol.17:9, 9-29. Winter 2008.
