= Carol Ann Toupes =

Carol Ann Toupes (January 31, 1936 – July 24, 2004) was one of the famed Toupes triplets whose birth and early childhood captivated the San Francisco media of the day. She predeceased her sisters, dying of liver cancer in her home in San Francisco.
