= Carol Anne O'Marie =

American writer

Personal life
- Born: August 28, 1933
- Died: May 27, 2009 (aged 75)

Religious life
- Religion: Roman Catholic
- Order: Religious Congregation of the Sisters of St. Joseph of Carondelet
- Profession: Writer

Sister Carol Anne O'Marie, C.S.J., (August 28, 1933 – May 27, 2009) was a Roman Catholic sister in the Religious Congregation of the Sisters of St. Joseph of Carondelet. She was also a mystery writer.

She wrote eleven novels, whose protagonist is Sister Mary Helen, an elderly sister who solves crimes. Most of the books are based in San Francisco, California, where O'Marie was born. Sister Carol Anne also ran a shelter for homeless women with Sister Maureen Lyons in Oakland, California.

She died, aged 75, from Parkinson's disease on May 27, 2009.

Sister Carol Anne wrote Like a Swarm of Bees, published by Graphic Visions in 2010. She finished the manuscript shortly before her death. It was written to recall a prophecy and a promise spoken in 1805 by the Abbé Piron of Saint-Étienne, France, by which he foretold that the Sisters of St. Joseph would increase in number and "like a swarm of bees" spread everywhere.

== Bibliography ==
Sister Mary Helen Mysteries

- Novena for Murder (Book 1), 1984
- Advent of Dying (Book 2), 1986
- The Missing Madonna (Book 3), 1988
- Murder in Ordinary Time (Book 4), 1991
- Murder Makes a Pilgrimage (Book 5), 1993
- Death Goes on Retreat (Book 6), 1995
- Death of an Angel (Book 7), 1997
- Death Takes Up a Collection (Book 8), 1998
- Requiem at the Refuge (Book 9), 2000
- The Corporal Works of Murder (Book 10), 2002
- Murder at the Monks' Table (Book 11), 2006
