= Carol Hughes (author) =

American writer

Carol Anne Hughes (born February 14, 1961 (Note: As of May 2015, the U.S. Library of Congress and WorldCat record for Carol Hughes are incoherent. LC maintains two identities differentiated by years of birth 1955 and 1961. For the latter author of Jack Black it cites a 1999 phone call to the publisher for birth date February 14, 1961, and cited Contemporary Authors Online for "Carol Hughes, 1955-; born in 1955 (one source says 1961), in Yorkshire, England; animation artist and author of children's books". For its own author born 1955, it credits So Young, So Sad, So Listen (2005) and cites the British Library for "Hughes, Carol, 1955-; Carol Lindsay Hughes, born 8 Jan. 1955". Online catalog records for works attributed to Carol Hughes, undifferentiated, one copy of Jack Black, among other works evidently created by different people. WorldCat (below) attributes some foreign-language works including a Turkish translation of one Toots book to the identity with 1955 year of birth. Another is a 1979 Dutch translation of Nurse in Disgrace, whereas it attributes a 1978 English original of Nurse at Golden Water to the one born 1961. ISFDB, also linked below, gives birthyear 1955 without a source, notably not English Wikipedia.)) is a British-born American writer of children's and young adult novels. She has written about magic, pirates and princesses.

Carol Hughes lives in London with her husband and daughters.

== Writer ==
Hughes wanted to be an actor as a schoolgirl, and she went to art college, but on both occasions she found herself writing stories instead.

== Books ==
- Jack Black and the Ship of Thieves (1997) – Publishers Weekly said of this book: "With a swashbuckling style and an imagination in overdrive, Hughes ... grabs readers on page one and never lets go." and "Entertaining from start to finish." On the other hand, Kirkus Reviews observed that "there's little of the imaginative flair that characterizes the novels this models: the science fantasies of Jules Verne and Philip Pullman." The Kirkus reviewer of Toots Underground remarked positively on Jack Black one year later, quoted below.
- Dirty Magic (2006)
- The Princess and the Unicorn (2009)

Toots series

- Toots and the Upside-Down House (1996)
- Toots Upside Down Again (1998)
- Toots Underwater (1999)
- Toots Underground (2001)
