= Carole Seborovski =

American artist (born 1960)

Carole Ann Seborovski
- Born: 1960 (age 65–66)
- Education: California College of the Arts; Hunter College (MFA)
- Website: caroleseborovski.com

Carole Ann Seborovski (born 1960) is an American artist.

== Education ==
Seborovski graduated from the California College of the Arts and earned her Master of Fine Arts degree from Hunter College, where she would later work as an adjunct professor.

== Collections ==
Her work is included in the collections of the Whitney Museum of American Art, the Metropolitan Museum of Art and the Museum of Modern Art, New York.
