= Enver Hasani =

Kosovar judge and academic

Enver Hasani was the president of the Constitutional Court of Kosovo.

== Biography ==
Hasani was born in Mitrovica, Kosovo. He completed his elementary and middle school programs in Mitrovica, while his law studies were completed at the University of Pristina, Kosovo, where he achieved outstanding results among his peers.

He received a Master of Laws degree. He went to earn a second MA in Ankara, Turkey at the Bilkent University in the Department of International Relations, where he also completed his PhD studies in the field of International law and Relations. He has been working at the Faculty of Law of the University of Pristina in Kosovo since 1987, where he is currently a professor of International Law and International Relations.

In the period from November 23, 1992 to October 1, 1997, he worked as a legal adviser for the Albanian Ministry of Foreign Affairs in Tirana, accredited by the Kosovar Government in exile until May 11, 1999.

At the Rambouillet Peace Conference on Kosovo (1999) Enver Hasani served as a legal adviser for the Kosovar Albanian Delegation.

Enver Hasani is the author of scores of academic articles and essays published in internationally credited journals and has been a participant at various academic training activities in the field of Human Rights and the Rule of Law.

In 2000, Hasani was one of compilers of the project for establishing the Department of Political Science and Public Administration at the University of Pristina and served as its head until 2002. At the same period of time, he also served as the head and the founder of the Human Rights Centre of the University of Prishtina, a project which was supported by the Finnish Human Rights Project and WUS-Austria.

Prior to his appointment as Judge of the Constitutional Court in 2009, president Hasani served as the rector of the University of Pristina, a position held from 2006 after serving as the dean of Faculty of Law of this University. In 2004, when the Kosovo's Office for Foreign Relations was established, Enver Hasani served as its head until 2006.

== Notable decisions by the Constitutional Court of Kosovo ==
- On 30 March 2011 the Constitutional Court of Kosovo declared that the constitution was broken during the election of Behgjet Pacolli as President.http://www.gjk-ks.org/repository/docs/ko_29_11_agj_om_ang.pdf
