= Ray Carolan =

Cavan Gaelic footballer

Personal information
- Native name: Réamann Ó Cearbhalláin (Irish)
- Born: County Cavan, Ireland

Sport
- Sport: Gaelic football
- Position: Midfielder
Inter-county
- Years: County
- Cavan
Inter-county titles
- Ulster titles: 4
- All-Irelands: 0
- All Stars: 2

Ray Carolan is a former Gaelic footballer who played for the Cavan county team.

== Playing career ==
Born in 1943 Ray Carolan was a midfielder and played his club football with Cross and later with Cuchulainns (an amalgamation in 1969 of Cross and Mullagh teams). for 22 years. His last game with Cuchulainns was playing in an intermediate final in 1980 by which time he was also the team manager. His playing career started in St Patrick's College Cavan and he progressed to play for Cavan minors and junior teams and then on the senior team from 1962 - 1974. In addition he also played for Ulster in the Railway Cup and in competitions in the US and at Wembley.

He won his first MacRory Cup medal with St Patrick's College Cavan in 1961 and captained the team to victory again in 1962 receiving a newly commissioned cup which was not replaced until 2012.

Ulster Junior Championship medal in 1962

Ulster Senior Championship medals in 1962, ’64, ’67 and ’69.

Railway Cup medals with Ulster in 1963, ‘ 65, ’66 ’68. 70 and 71.

Two Dr McKenna Cup medals

Wembley Cup medals in 1966 and '67

Cú Chulainn Awards in 1966 and '67 (precursor to the All Star Awards which started in 1971) .

As well as captaining the 1970 Ulster team, he also served as captain on the Cavan senior and minor teams as well as at club level with Cross and Cuchalainns.

== Other Achievements ==
Selected to play in Cardinal Cushing games in New York, Boston and Hartford in 1966

Replacement in All Star teams which played in San Francisco in 1971 and 1972

Two Wembley Cup medals in 1966 and 1967

Selected centre field on Cavan Team of the Century (1900 - 2000)

Selected centre field Irish Farmers Journal - All Ireland Farmers Team of All Times

Selected in top 125 greatest stars of GAA (up to 2009)

Selected centre field on Ulster GAA All Stars (1962 - 2012)

In addition to playing, he managed the Cavan Junior team which won the Ulster Junior Championship in 1984 as well as managing Cuchulains and Cavan Gaels teams for two year terms. He has been a member of Breffni Park Development Committee for 40 years.

In December 2025 he was nominated honorary President of Cavan County GAA Board for the incoming year.

He has been interviewed in a number of podcasts about his playing career

Where We Belong Podcast The Men Who Played Wembley - A Cavan Sporting Legacy (March 2026) An interview with Ray Carolan, Gabriel Kelly, Tom Lynch, Cormac Cahill and Phil Murray about playing GAA in Wembley Stadium, London in the 1960s

https://open.spotify.com/episode/6acvXseEz9ns1MDHzKPaGx?si=3df1b95d15b743e3

We Are Cavan Podcast An interview where Ray Carolan sits down with Patsy Lee to talk about his football career and his early years in St. Patrick's College (March 2024)

https://open.spotify.com/episode/7mScHWiFsbomy1og2ZgEcW (Part 1)

https://open.spotify.com/episode/6D7WvWxXwCw8g6JgTDpasK?si=EMZbc6suSf2st4qF4ZDExg (Part 2)

In his non sporting life, he farmed in Cavan with pigs and cattle. He won the Beef Suckler Farm of the Year 1988 and in 2008 received the Hall of Fame Award for his contribution to the development of the Limousin Breed in Ireland

President of the Irish Limousin Cattle Society

President of the International Limousin Council

Board member of Board Bia Ireland for two terms

Chair of the Bord Bia Meat and Livestock Board

Member of the Virginia Agricultural Show committee

He is married to Una and has three children: Fidelma, Niall and Rachel

Ray Carolan, St Patricks College Cavan - 1962 winning captain of new commissioned MacRory Cup

https://commons.wikimedia.org/wiki/File:Ray_Carolan,_St_Patricks_College_Cavan_-_1962_winning_captain_of_MacRory_Cup.jpg
