= Tom Carolan =

American music executive

Tom Carolan (born March 2, 1961) is an American music executive and entrepreneur. In his early career, serving as a senior artists and repertoire (A&R) executive at Atlantic Records, Sony 550 and Lava Records he was responsible for the signing and development of such artists as Stone Temple Pilots, The Lemonheads, Macy Gray, Jim Lauderdale, and Screamin' Cheetah Wheelies, to name a few. He was an executive producer of the first soundtrack for the film The Crow. Collectively, Carolan's work has sold well over 50 million albums.

== Entrepreneurial career ==
In 2004, Carolan founded J Rae Entertainment, named after his daughter Juliana Rae Carolan. The company specialized in recording live concert events while providing media publishing tools to artists to deliver directly to their fans. His work included recordings by Hootie & The Blowfish, Ted Nugent, Rancid, Rilo Kiley, and Papa Roach.

In 2007 Carolan folded J Rae Entertainment into Total Live Music, of which he is founder and president. The company is service provider to live entertainment as well as an online destination live music database. Its work over the years includes assisting Coachella Music Festival and Mile High Music Festival in capturing and streaming performances to the AT&T Blueroom.

Carolan founded Total Box Music, a design and manufacturing company focusing on limited-edition, collectible packages for recording artists. They have produced items for musicians including Keith Richards, Eric Clapton, No Doubt, Trent Reznor, Incubus, Robbie Robertson, Vince Neil, Helmet, Jewel, and Public Enemy.

Carolan also works with St. Jude Children's Research Hospital, helping them engage the music industry through their Music Gives to St. Jude Kids program with such initiatives as the Rock n Roll Hope Show.
