= Carol Pilars de Pilar =

German artist

Carol Anne Franziska Antonia Pilars de Pilar is a German artist.

== Life ==
After Highschool in South Africa (1975–1976) Carol Pilar studied painting and restoration in Florence. Since 1985 she is working as a freelance artist in Düsseldorf. Her paintings and sculptures are dealing with the tension between poverty and wealth.

== Exhibitions ==
- Lenzpumpen (1995), group exhibition in the Tabea Langenkamp Gallery
- Scharfer Blick (1995), group exhibition (with catalogue) in the Bundeskunsthalle, Bonn
- Ett hevetes förvandling (1996), Exhibition (with catalogue), Moderna Museet, Stockholm, Sweden
- Single exhibition in the Simon-Spiekermann-Galerie, Düsseldorf
- Toi Toi Toi (1998), group exhibition curated by Helga Meister, Düsseldorf, Germany
- Botschaft Düsseldorfer Project group exhibition (2001), Exhibition in the Simon-Spiekermann-Gallery with Volker Gatz, Düsseldorf
- Art Funds Stipend, Bonn (2002)
- Trendwände (2005), group exhibition in the Kunstraum Düsseldorf
- Große Kunstausstellung NRW (2005), Düsseldorf, Messehallen
- small Sculptures/large Aquarells (2006), single exhibition, Poststraße 3, Düsseldorf, Text Blazenka Perica
- Carol Pilars de Pilar/Franklin Berger (2007), Steinstraße 23, Düsseldorf
- Große Kunstausstellung NRW (2007), Museum Kunstpalast, Düsseldorf
- Bestiarium. The animal in the art (2008), group exhibition, Maxhaus, Düsseldorf
- Kunsthalle Flingern (2008), group exhibition, Düsseldorf
