= Yaakov Mutzafi =

Iraqi-born rabbi and kabbalist

Rabbi Yaakov Mutzafi
- יעקב מוצפי

Personal life
- Born: Ya'aqob Musafi; 1899
- Died: May 25, 1983 (aged 83–84) Jerusalem, Israel
- Buried: Mount of Olives Jewish Cemetery
- Education: Midrash Bet Zilkha

Religious life
- Religion: Judaism

Jewish leader
- Predecessor: Sadqa Hussein
- Synagogue: Shemesh Sedaqah Synagogue
- Organisation: Sephardi Edah HaHaredith
- Began: 1961
- Ended: 1983
- Yahrtzeit: 13 Siwan, 5743

Yaakov Mutzafi (Hebrew: יעקב מוצפי Ya'aqov Muṣafi; 1899 – May 25, 1983) was a rabbi and kabbalist. The last spiritual leader of the ancient Jewish community of Iraq, he moved to Israel ahead of the Jewish masses when they were finally airlifted there in 1952.

An anti-Zionist, in his later years Mutzafi served as the Av Beth Din of the Sephardi Edah HaHaredith, and rabbi of the Shemesh Sedaqah Synagogue in Jerusalem.

== Early life ==
Yaakov Mutzafi was born in Baghdad, Ottoman Iraq, the son of Ezra Musafi and Mazzal Tob. He received an early Torah education from his grandfather, Moshe Musafi, and his primary education at Midrash Talmud Torah alongside his life-long friend and colleague Silman Mutzafi. For his secondary education, Mutzafi was enrolled at Midrash Bet Zilkha, where he received instruction from Ephraim Cohen, Shimon Agassi, Yehuda Fatiyah and Sadqa Hussein, the latter with whom Mutzafi would share a lifetime of collaboration. He was later in charge of his own yeshiva within Midrash Bet Zilkha, which catered to students who were materially self-supporting. Mutzafi was affiliated with Yeshivath Dorshei Torah, where he studied alongside Silman Hugi Aboudi.

== Career ==
During the late 1930s, the British-backed Kingdom of Iraq was coming under increased pressure from pro-German Arab nationalists who were constantly agitating against the royal government, with Jews and other minorities caught in the middle. The building political pressure boiled over into a bloody pogrom against the Jews in Baghdad on June 1–2, 1941, which became known as the farhud. Over 180 Jews were killed, with many more injured in the violence. Mutzafi raced to open up the gates of Midrash Bet Zilkha to the surviving Jews who were evicted from their homes, and arranged for their upkeep via donations received from philanthropists in the community.

=== Move to Jerusalem ===
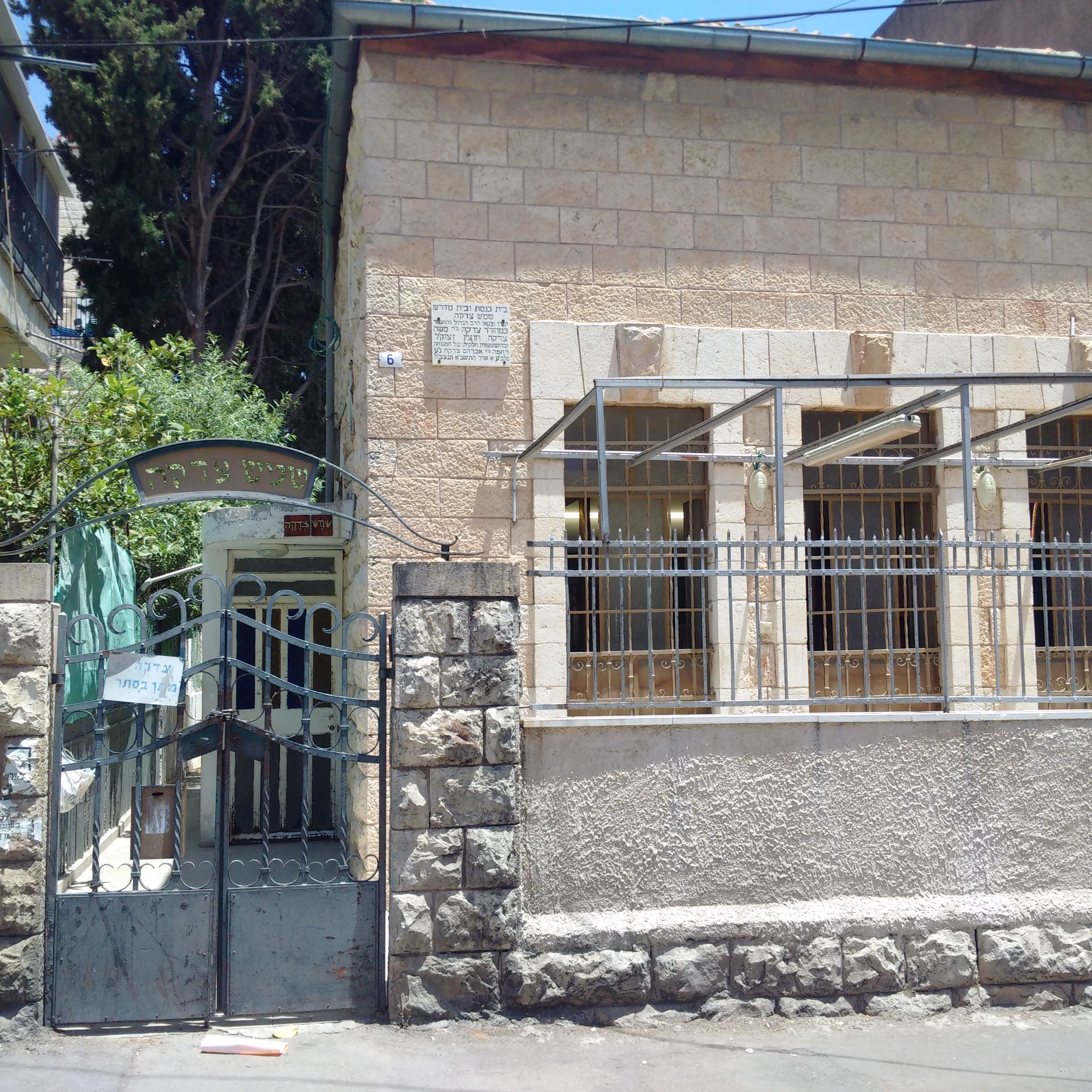
Shemesh Sedaqah Synagogue in 2016

With the tumultuous years of World War II over, the long history of the Jews in Iraq was entering its final phase. With the founding of the new state of Israel, Jewish life in the Arab world was becoming more precarious by the day. Between 1951 and 1952, the bulk of the Iraqi Jewish community was airlifted to Israel in what became known as Operation Ezra and Nehemiah.

Although he spent countless hours tending to the spiritual needs of the community, Mutzafi reasoned that there could be no viable future left for the Jews in Iraq. He had previously spent one month visiting with his former teacher Sadqa Hussein in Jerusalem, and in 1950 he finally moved there. He immediately took up scholarly residence at Shemesh Sedaqah Synagogue, where he was to serve as hazzan and rosh yeshiva, at first under the wing of his master. Upon the latter's death in 1961, Mutzafi inherited the full mantle of spiritual leadership of the transplanted community in Israel. Mutzafi could be seen, adorned in jellabiya and fez, giving council and administering blessings to Jews of various persuasions in the Beit Yisrael neighborhood.

== Politics ==
Mutzafi served as Av Beth Din of the Sephardi Edah HaHaredith, an organization more closely associated with the anti-Zionist rabbis of the Ashkenazi Old yishuv. Mutzafi shared the same beliefs as his fellows in the Edah regarding their disassociation from the Israeli government, most notably regarding the ban on taking part in elections to the Knesset, even encouraging participation in Neturei Karta demonstrations.

== Personal life and death ==
At the age of 17, Mutzafi married the daughter of Sasson Dangour, founder of Yeshivath Dorshei Torah. Mutzafi died in 1983, at the age of 83. He was buried at the Mount of Olives Jewish Cemetery.

== Legacy ==
Mutzafi was a mentor to Rishon LeZion Mordechai Eliyahu. The Jerusalem Municipality named a street in the Ramat Shlomo neighborhood in East Jerusalem after Mutzafi, as did the city of Beitar Illit.

== See also ==
- Yitzhak Kaduri

== Bibliography ==
- Habusha, Moshe (2024). זכרונות בגדאד וירושלים [Memories of Baghdad and Jerusalem] (in Hebrew) (2 ed.). p. 336.
