= Brit HaKanaim =

Radical Jewish underground organisation

- ברית הקנאים
- Leader: Shlomo Lorincz (1918–2009) Rabbi Mordechai Eliyahu (1929–2010)
- Founded: 10 April 1950
- Dates active: 1950–1953
- Dissolved: 1953
- Country: Israel
- Ideology: Halaka
- Size: 35 members

Brit HaKanaim (Hebrew: בְּרִית הַקַנַאִים, lit. Covenant of the Zealots) was a Jewish organisation which operated in Israel between 1950 and 1953, in opposition to the widespread trend of secularisation in the country.

The group was made up of students of the Porat Yosef Yeshiva in Jerusalem. The organization had approximately more than thirty-five members at its peak.

Among its members were Rabbi Mordechai Eliyahu, who later served as the Sephardic Chief Rabbi of Israel, and Shlomo Lorincz, who later served as chairman of the Knesset Finance Committee as a member of Agudat Yisrael.

The ultimate goal of the movement was to apply Jewish law in the State of Israel and establish a Halakhic state. The arrest of members of the organization brought to the public agenda issues about the relation between religious groups and public institutions in the State of Israel, but also issues of proper treatment of detainees, and the use of administrative detention rules to enforce the law on political and religious movements.

== Origins ==
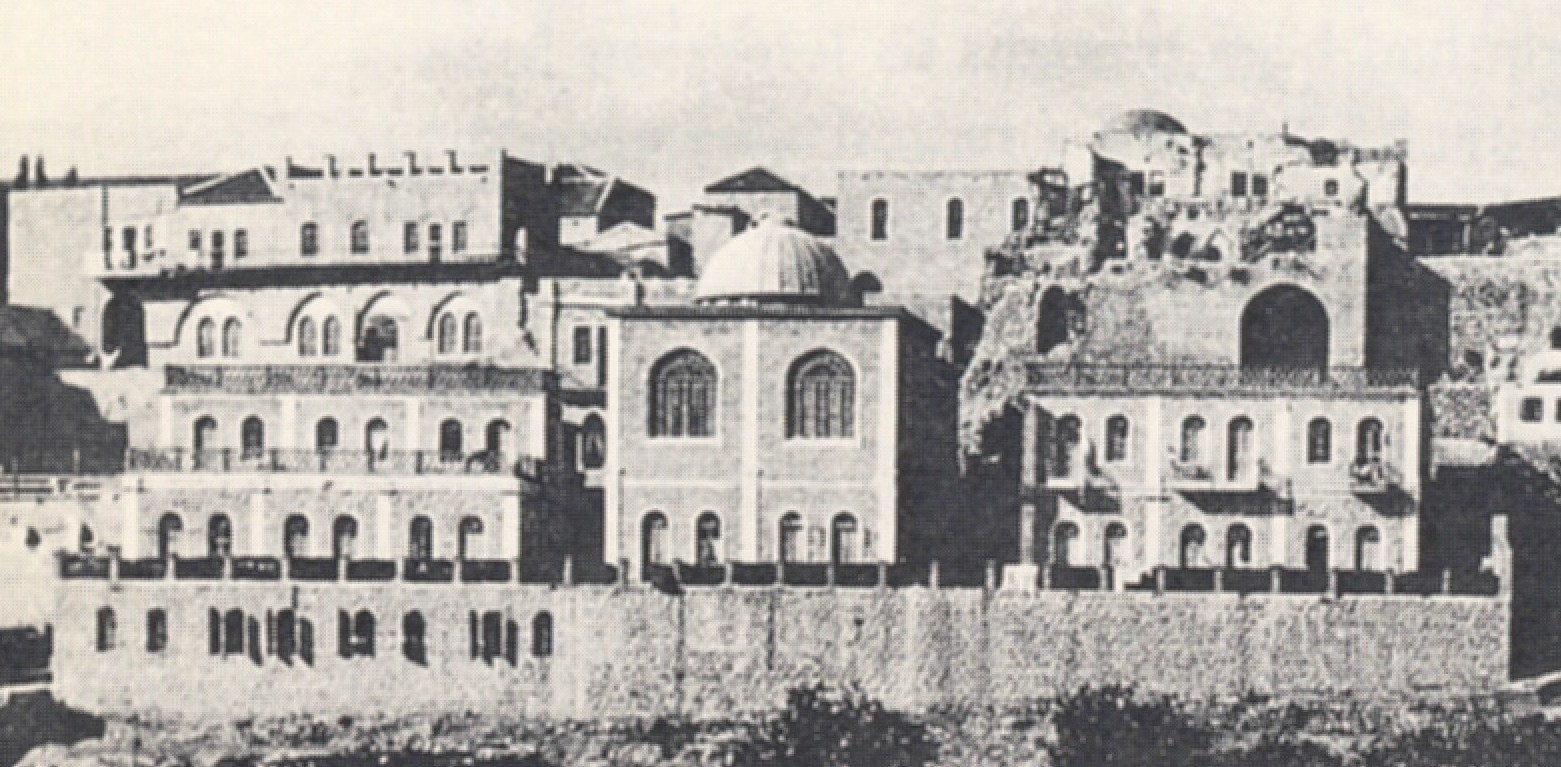
Porat Yosef Yeshiva in the Old City of Jerusalem as it stood before 1948

On the evening of May 14, 1948, "the sovereignty of the State of Israel was solemnly proclaimed during a ceremony at the Tel Aviv museum – a true crowning achievement of the Zionist movement half a century after its founding congress". Within hours of the public reading of the Declaration of Independence by the prime minister of the Provisional government David Ben Gurion, "the new Jewish state was recognized by the United States and the Soviet Union". This event generated a real "shock experienced by the orthodox communities". The new state, which professed to be secular, "had promoted a set of principles and ideologies that did not come from the original Jewish sources of Israel. The members of the ultra-Orthodox communities believed that only a Messiah descendant of King David could be the founder of the Jewish sovereign state and the Third Temple, and therefore they regarded the nascent state as the desecration of a long Jewish tradition". The advent of the State of Israel, in fact, brought the main exponents to the top of power of the Zionist movement – primarily Ben Gurion who in 1946 was appointed leader of the international Zionist Organization. Zionism was historically constituted as "a national movement led by Jews that rebelled to the Orthodox leadership and followed the modernisation of Jewish life that began in the 18th century". "European" Jews who aspired to receive a comprehensive, up-to-date education and to exercise modern and worldly professions gradually came out of their closed communities to integrate into surrounding societies. These emancipated and modernized communities in Europe helped shape new forms and expressions of Jewish identity. "The increasingly evident rupture between those Jews and their traditional societies allowed for the creation of different interpretations of the Jewish commandments and new sources of authority". On the other hand, although Zionism recognized the Jewish religion as a fundamental part giving the national identity of Israel, it found himself in the position of "having to challenge not only religious institutions by presenting his national destiny, but also separate to get away from what religiosity symbolized". The national relaunch required a break with the past and an attempt to replace Judaism, a religion identified with a distant past, with "a modern identity based on culture, ethnicity, a historical sense of belonging to the Jewish people and an approach proactive towards the future". On the relationship between religious orthodoxy and Zionism and his political conjugation, Theodor Herzl wrote in his programmatic book A Jewish State:

Should We Become a Theocracy? No. Faith unites us, knowledge gives us the freedom. So we will prevent theocratic tendencies from manifesting in the first place place, by our priesthood. We will keep our priests inside of the confines of their temples in the same way that we will keep our army within the borders of their barricades.

— Theodor Herzl, A Jewish State, p. 57

These disagreements led to a series of clashes between the religious leaders of the Orthodox communities, whose intent was to make Israel a Halakhic state, and the political elites, who wanted to lead Israel on a path of secularisation and modernisation.

== Establishment of the underground ==
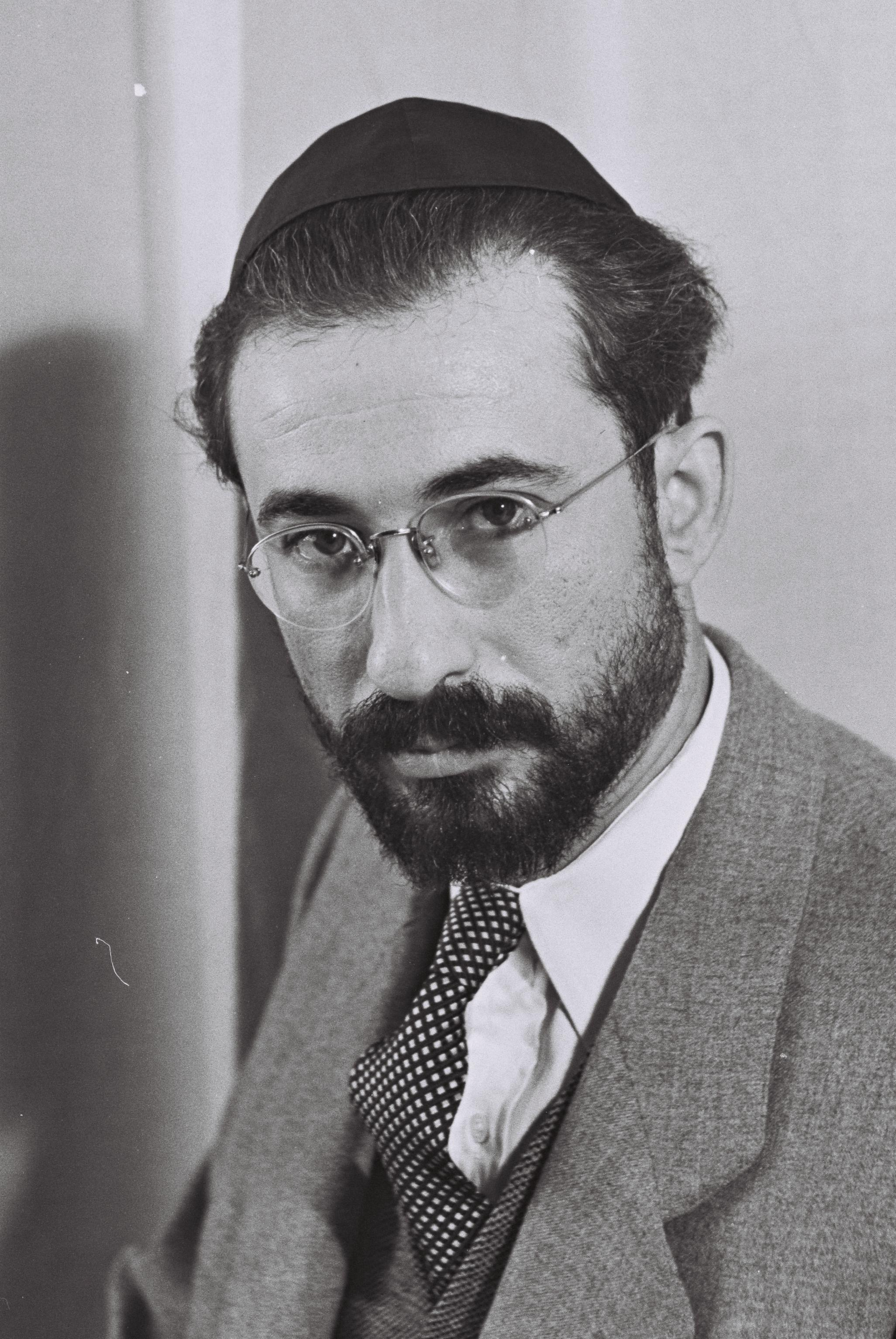
Rabbi Shlomo Lorincz, upon his election to the Knesset on 30 December 1951

=== Leaders ===
Porat Yosef Yeshiva wanted to remain alien to these modernizing impulses and to openings to the outside. The community of scholars of the sacred texts of Judaism, which populated it, according to which every subject considered "worldly" was kept out of the course of study, could only be an ideal forge of figures among the students in open contrast to the secularisation that the Israeli government was intent on imposing. Two students from Porat Yosef Yeshiva, in particular, played a central role in this struggle against the State of Israel: Rabbi Mordechai Eliyahu and Rabbi Shlomo Lorincz.

- Rabbi Mordechai Eliyahu was born on 3 March 1929 in the Jewish quarter of Jerusalem. He was the son of the Iraqi Jewish Rabbi Salman Eliyahu, a Kabbalist from Jerusalem, and his wife Mazal, sister of Rabbi Yehuda Tzadka, who held various positions at the Porat Yosef Yeshiva. It was through this acquaintance that, despite the financial difficulties his family was experiencing, Eliyahu was able to begin his studies at the Porat Yosef Yeshiva. He was a pupil not only of Rabbi Tzadka himself, but also of Rabbi Ezra Attiya.
- Rabbi Shlomo Lorincz, on the other hand, came from Budapest. Between 1933 and 1935, he studied with Rabbi Yaakov Yechezkiya Greenwald at the Papa Yeshiva in Hungary. At the end of 1935, he went to Poland to study at the Mir Yeshiva. He then returned to Hungary and from there Lorincz emigrated to Mandatory Palestine in 1939, and was involved in the illegal immigration of Jews from Hungary. Once in Israel, he came into contact with the youth groups of the Agudat Yisrael party and continued his studies at the Porat Yosef Yeshiva.

=== Foundation meeting ===
Their destinies crossed during the Passover week of 1950 when the two of them, together with three other students from the Porat Yosef Yeshiva, met secretly. This meeting ended on 10 April with the establishment of a new underground organisation: Brit HaKanaim or the 'Covenant of the Zealots'. The initial group then began to recruit other yeshiva students, who they knew and expected would agree to join the group. At its peak, the group consisted of more than thirty-five students, divided into teams of six members each. This is how Rabbi Mordechai Eliyahu recalled the motives and occasion when the organisation came into being:

I felt that the Jews suffered from an inferiority complex that drove them to a further sense of underestimation on the other side...on the eighth day of Nisan (= 10 April) of 1950, we met at the Porat Yosef Yeshiva and decided to form an organisation with the aim of arousing Jewish pride. Five of us were involved.

— Ehud Sprinzak, Brother Against Brother, p. 65

== Organisation and motivations ==
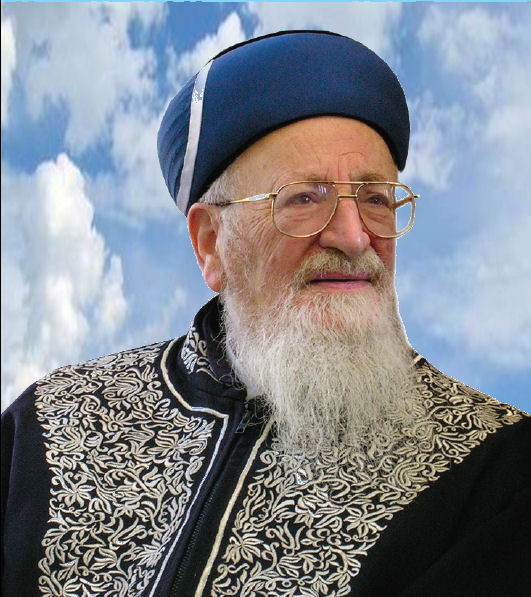
Chief Rabbi Mordechai Eliyahu (posthumous collage)

According to the ideological assumptions of the organisation's members, formed from the religious education imparted to them in the yeshiva, there were three main reasons for the friction and confrontation with the initiatives of the Israeli government: the national education system, the Shabbat day, and the recruitment of women into the IDF ("Israel Defence Forces"). Among the Orthodox communities, the Israeli government's policy of insisting that the children of Jewish immigrants, mostly religious or traditionalist, who arrived after the advent of the State of Israel should study in the secular national education system soon became unpopular. This caused great anger among the religious and ultra-Orthodox public.

The members of Brit HaKanaim perceived this "as the initial phase of a cultural war intended to put an end to the Orthodox world and therefore felt an obligation to fight it". Rabbi Mordechai Eliyahu himself recalled how his concerns and subsequent intention to establish Brit HaKanaim stemmed from the issue of education:

When I was at the Porat Yosef Yeshiva, I learned for the first time what was happening regarding the educational situation of immigrant children in the camps for newcomers...I could not tolerate this catastrophe...I thought that we could use the underground movement to establish a Torah-based way of life in the nation....

— Ehud Sprinzak, Brother Against Brother, p. 65

In addition to the 'educational conflict', there was also the issue of the Sabbath to increase tensions between secular and religious. In addition to the attacks relating to the Sabbath controversy and the further violent demonstrations by the Orthodox communities to stop all public activities on the Sabbath, there were just as many secular counter-demonstrations. For example, "anonymous secular-minded people attacked the then Minister of Transport, David-Zvi Pinkas (1895–1952), in response to the Sabbath rules that were laid down by him (due to an oil shortage, the government stipulated that for two days a week there would be no traffic, and one of these days was the Sabbath)".

The last point under consideration is the issue of recruiting women into the regular Israeli army. In the days before the foundation of the State of Israel, an agreement had been reached an agreement between Ben-Gurion and the public religious leaders according to which any young girl, whose religious observance had been confirmed, would be exempted from the military service. However, once the IDF was established, the country's political leaders worked tirelessly to undo the agreement. On 14 May 1951 in the Knesset held a debate on an amendment to the sensitive issue of recruiting of women in the IDF. Faced with this, Mordechai Eliyahu stated:

I realised that we had to respond... that talking would not help; we had to do more drastic things. The goal was for it to be known in the Knesset that there are circles that oppose the law.

— Pedahzur, Ami; Perliger, Arie, Jewish Terrorism in Israel, p. 34

== Main attacks ==
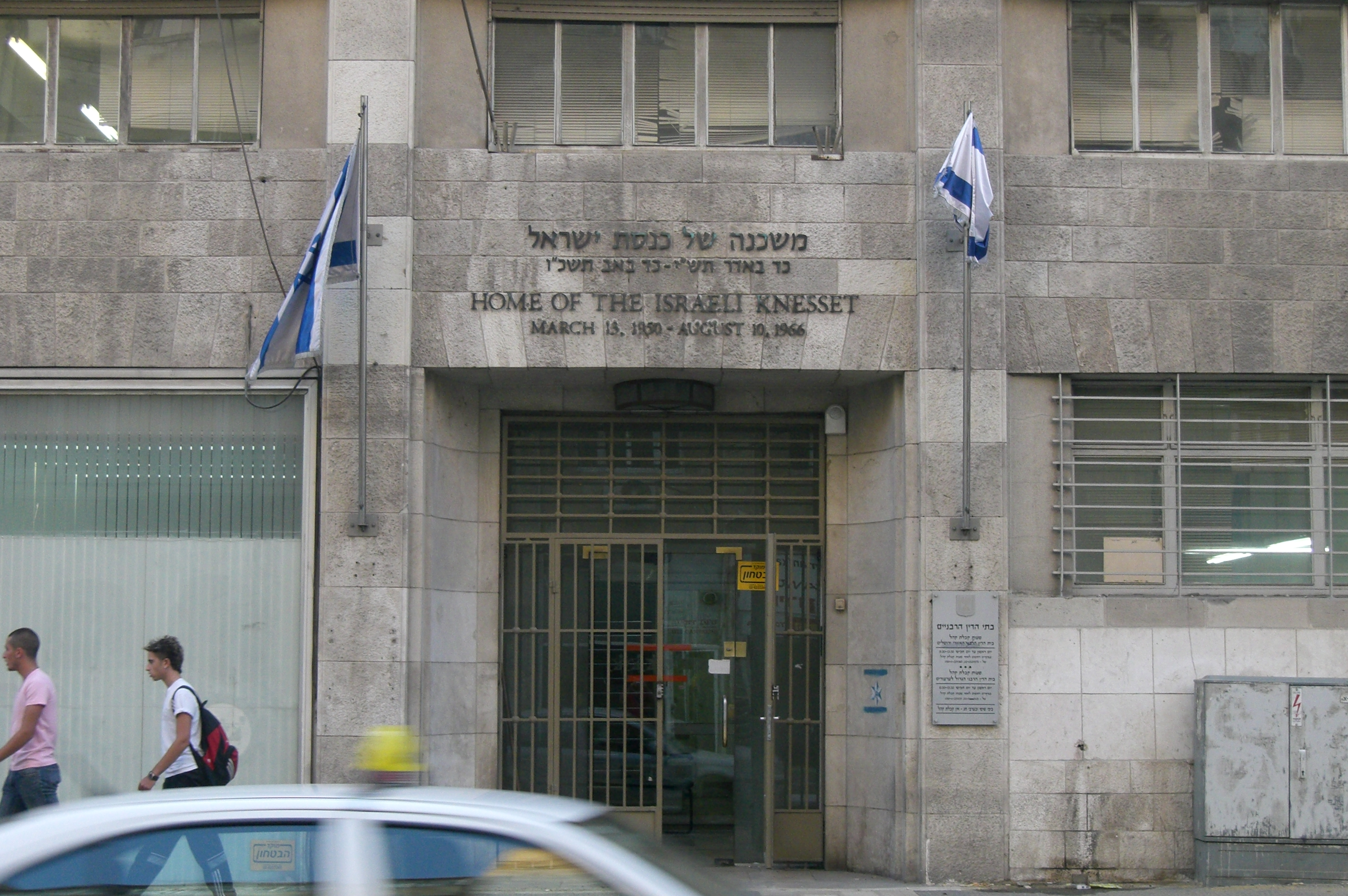
Beit Frumin in 2006. It was the temporary abode of the Israeli Parliament, the Knesset, from 1950 to 1966

=== First attacks ===
On 19 January 1951, a double attempt was made to torch several cars in north Jerusalem. The owners of the cars had driven on the Sabbath, on which, according to Jewish tradition, it is forbidden to engage in any form of labor – lit. melachah (plural: melachot). On the same day, a large number of petrol-soaked sacks were placed in the garage of the largest transport operator in Israel, Egged, to protest against the circulation of public transport on Sabbath day.

With these two acts of violence, the terrorist organisation Brit HaKanaim made its debut on the scene of the newly founded State of Israel. In reality, the organisation had already begun operating during previous months when it had sent threatening letters to taxi companies in Jerusalem that operated on Saturdays. Members of the organisation had also travelled around Jerusalem, marking the cars travelling on Shabbat. The number plates were noted down by folding the corresponding page numbers in the books of Gemara that they carried with them, to avoid profaning the Shabbat. Afterwards, the cars, once identified, were set on fire with homemade Molotov cocktails.

=== Operation Bride and Operation Melon ===
On 14 May 1951, the Knesset met as usual at the Beit Frumin in Jerusalem to discuss an amendment to the issue of recruiting of women in the IDF. Electricity was supplied to the building from the nearby Eden Hotel. The plan, devised by Brit HaKanaim, was that once a homemade smoke bomb had been thrown into the building, another activist, named Noah Wermesser, was to cut off the electricity to the Knesset. This initiative was given the clandestine nickname 'Operation Bride'. At the same time, a further attack was to take place. The target was the recruitment offices of the Ministry of Defence, whose archives were to be set on fire and destroyed. The code name in this case was 'Operation Melon'. After an early closure of the Knesset meeting, and before they had time to implement their plan, the members of the group were arrested by the Shin Bet, which had managed to infiltrate two agents into the underground network. After lengthy investigations, most of the group members who had been arrested were gradually released and only four of the organisation's leaders were brought to trial and prosecuted: Yehuda Rieder, Mordechai Eliyahu, Eliyahu Raful-Rafael and Noah Wermesser. All received sentences ranging from six months to one year in prison.

== Legacy ==
This was one of the first obvious cases in which a religious elite, educated according to the principles and teachings imparted at the Porat Yosef Yeshiva, decided to set up a terrorist organisation on an ideological-religious basis. The aim of the latter was to openly challenge a political class that threatened to reduce religion and its cornerstones to a crutch of the new national identity.

These rabbis did not conceive religion and politics as two separate and distinct tracks, but as necessarily intertwined, since there could be no people of Israel without the observance of the sacred texts and precepts contained therein. The one true State of Israel, according to the members of Brit HaKanaim, already had its own law: the Halakha they studied. Any alternative was, therefore, both an attack on Jewish tradition and on the Jewish people themselves. Terrorism was, in their eyes, the only real possibility, in the face of the Israeli government's aversion, for "the establishment of an orthodox regime, based on the principle of God's justice, a dictatorial regime without democracy", imposing "that all citizens live according to the Torah by influencing the existing system of government".

== See also ==
- Israel Defence Forces
- Kingdom of Israel, another radical underground group operating at the same time
- Orthodox Judaism

== Bibliography ==
- Ben-Porat, Guy (2013). Between State and Synagogue: The Secularization of Contemporary Israel. Cambridge: Cambridge University Press. ISBN 978-1-139-61557-0. OCLC 823724546.
- Black, Ian (2017). Enemies and Neighbours: Arabs and Jews in Palestine and Israel, 1917-2017. UK: Allen Lane. ISBN 978-0241004425.
- Brenner, Michael (2003). Zionism: A Brief History (1st ed.). Princeton: Markus Wiener Publishers. ISBN 1-55876-300-7. OCLC 50774465.
- Herzl, Theodor (2015). A Jewish State: Proposal of a Modern Solution for the Jewish Question. Scotts Valley, California: Createspace Independent Pub. ISBN 978-1508629603.
- Pedahzur, Ami; Perliger, Arie (2011). Jewish Terrorism in Israel. New York: Columbia University Press. ISBN 978-0-231-154475. OCLC 317068141.; also ISBN 978-0-231-15446-8, www.worldcat.org/oclc/317068141
- Sprinzak, Ehud (1999). Brother Against Brother: Violence and Extremism in Israeli Politics from Altalena to the Rabin Assassination. New York, NY: Free Press. ISBN 0-684-85344-2. OCLC 39515042.
