= Sadqa Hussein =

Iraqi rabbi (1876–1961)

Hakham Sadqa Hussein צדקה חוצין

Personal life
- Born: February 3, 1876 Baghdad, Ottoman Iraq
- Died: February 17, 1961 (aged 85) Jerusalem, Israel
- Buried: Sanhedria Cemetery
- Education: Midrash Bet Zilkha
- Occupation: Mohel

Religious life
- Religion: Judaism

Jewish leader
- Successor: Yaakov Mutzafi
- Synagogue: Shemesh Sedaqah Synagogue
- Organisation: Sephardi Edah HaHaredith
- Began: 1929
- Ended: 1961
- Yahrtzeit: 1 Adar 5721

Sadqa Hussein (Hebrew: צדקה חוצין; in Ashkenazi Hebrew: Tzadka Chutzin; Arabic: صدقا حسين, February 3, 1876 – February 17, 1961) was a Sephardi dayan, mohel, and spiritual leader to the Iraqi Jewish community in Iraq and Israel. He taught thousands of students in Baghdad, and led the Iraqi expatriate community in Jerusalem. He was the founder and rosh mesivta of the Shemesh Sedaqah Synagogue in the Geula neighborhood of Jerusalem.

== Early life ==
Sadqa Hussein was born in Baghdad, Ottoman Iraq, to Moshe Hussein, and grew up in a prosperous family. He was a fifth-generation descendant of the 18th-century rabbi Sadqa Bekhor Hussein, the author of the halakhic responsa Sedaqah U-Mishpat. In his youth, he studied at Midrash Bet Zilkha, the foremost yeshiva of its day, under the tutelage of Elisha Dangour, Av Beit Din of Baghdad. He later studied under the Ben Ish Hai, who would count him among his favorite students. Hussein's financial situation allowed him to pursue his studies uninterrupted, allowing him to achieve a high degree of Torah scholarship.

== Career ==
Hussein founded Midrash Talmud Torah, the community heder (primary school) in Baghdad, which accepted hundreds of children regardless of their parents' ability to pay tuition. Funding for the school was arranged by way of a luxury tax that was imposed on the sale of meat. During his years in Baghdad, Hussein personally taught upwards of 4,000 children. Every evening he gave a shiur (lecture) in halakha to householders that went four or five hours. From those years he earned the title "Hakham Sadqa", which he was known by the rest of his life.

As a consequence of World War I, the Ottoman Empire lost control of Iraq to the United Kingdom. At first, the material situation of the local Jews improved. The British, who found themselves in control of a vastly enlarged empire, needed clerks who were familiar with the local language and customs to help them with their bureaucracy, and found the Jews to be suited to the task. The Jewish community would go on to take a commanding role in the banking and insurance sectors of the economy. This period also saw many young students seeking to advance their education abroad at the great universities of England.

As a result of these events, the Jews began to drift away from their traditional customs, taking on a more modern approach to their daily lives. Eventually, certain people in the laity began to challenge some of Hussein's education policies, especially in regards to the unpopular meat tax, and his decision to omit most secular studies from the Talmud Torah's curriculum. He stood virtually alone against his adversaries, who did not refrain from trying to compromise him vis-à-vis the authorities on account of his perceived antiquated positions. By calling for public protests, fasting, and the reading of kinnot (dirges), he eventually succeeded in blocking the reformers' initiatives, refusing to give in to his opponents' disregard for the traditions that had been bequeathed to him by his mentors.

=== Shemesh Sedaqah Synagogue ===
Shemesh Sedaqah Synagogue
- Hebrew: בית כנסת ובית מדרש שמש צדקה
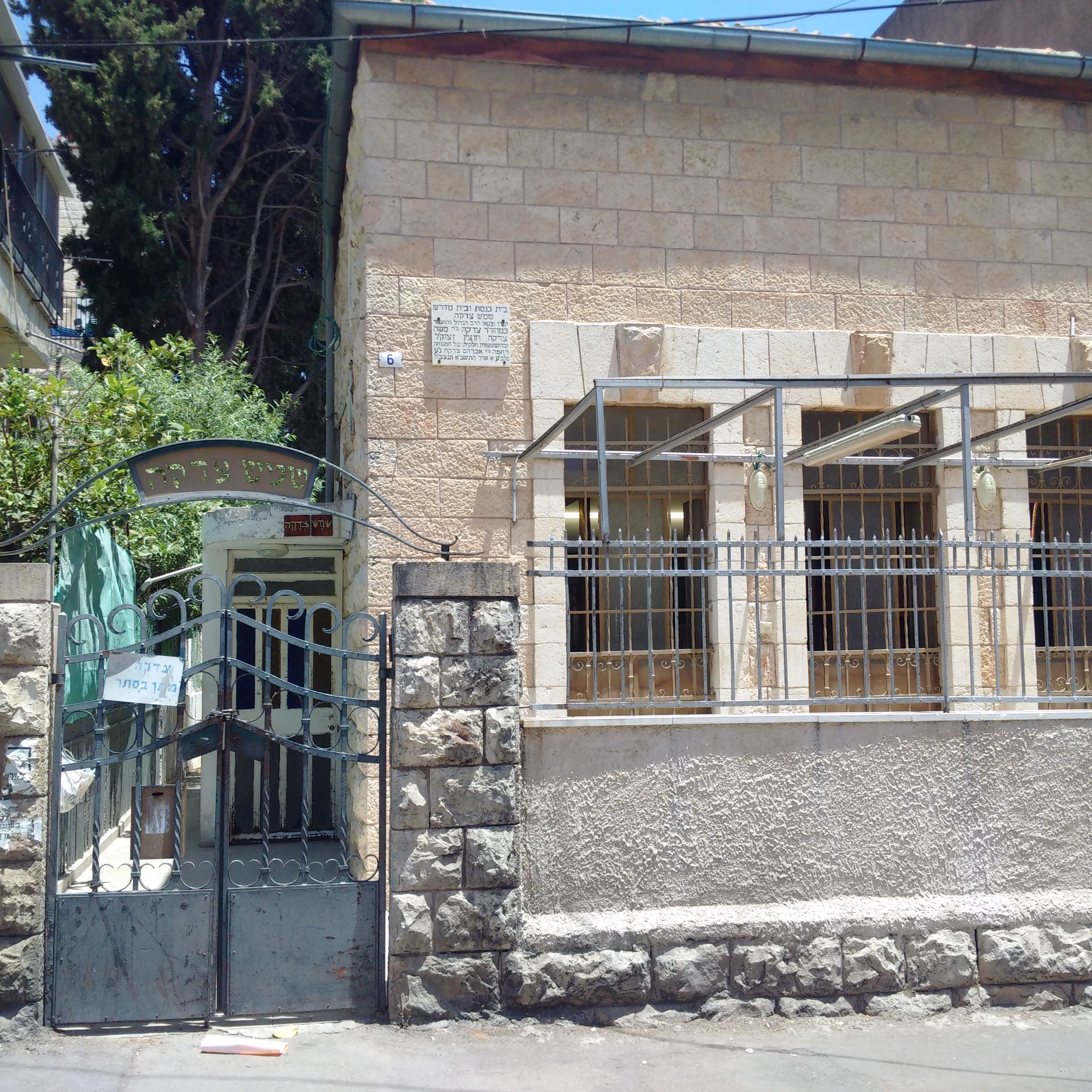
- The Shemesh Sedaqah Synagogue in 2016

Religion
- Affiliation: Orthodox Judaism
- Rite: Nusach Sefard
- Ecclesiastical or organizational status: Synagogue
- Status: Active

Location
- Location: Haggai Street, Geula, Jerusalem
- Country: Israel

Architecture
- Founder: Rabbi Sadqa Hussein
- Completed: 1929

Having absorbed from his master the Ben Ish Hai a longing for Jerusalem, Hussein had made a pilgrimage there in 1904 together with Yaakov Chaim Sofer (the Kaf HaHayyim) and Yehezkel Ezra Rahamim (the Asei HaYa'ar), where they held communion in the court of Yaakov Shaul Elyashar. In 1924, with his family and a few close disciples, Hussein made aliyah and settled in Jerusalem, then part of British Mandatory Palestine.

In 1929, Hussein established the Shemesh Sedaqah Synagogue (Hebrew: בית כנסת ובית מדרש שמש צדקה), an Orthodox Jewish synagogue, located on Haggai Street in the Geula neighborhood of Jerusalem. The name of the congregation was derived from the verse "And the sun (שמש) of righteousness (צדקה) shall arise with healing in its wings" (Malachi 3:20). Hussein both led the synagogue as rabbi, and taught shiurim in the synagogue to students and local householders.

Hussein endeavored to fulfill many of the mitzvot hateluyot ba'aretz (commandments particular to the Land of Israel). To that end, he planted wheat in the backyard of the synagogue, separating from it the terumah and ma'aser (tithes), and relinquished the pe'ah (field corner for the poor). He would then harvest it for use in his own specially prepared matzo (unleavened Passover bread), which he then distributed. He also kept a donkey for the fulfillment of the petter hamor (redemption of the firstborn).

Hussein demanded this kind of scrupulousness from his peers as well. One time in the 1950s, he asked his student Mordechai Eliyahu to arrange a meeting for him with Yoel Teitelbaum, the Grand Rabbi of Satmar, who was visiting Jerusalem at the time. Hussein ordered Teitelbaum to desist from his practice of riding in a car on Friday afternoon after sundown; Teitelbaum based this practice on the rulings of Rabbeinu Tam, but Hussein deemed it a violation of the Shabbat.

=== Sefardi Edah HaHaredith ===
An anti-Zionist, Hussein refused to receive any benefit from his status in the community, recusing himself from any formal rabbinic position, although he did serve as dayan in the Sephardi Edah HaHaredith. He set up free Torah lectures for young and old, and either paid for tutors out of his own pocket, or taught the lessons himself. An expert mohel, Hussein performed circumcisions on thousands of infants, sometimes to a fourth generation in the family.

== Personal life and death ==
Hussein married No'am, his first cousin, the daughter of Avraham Sadqa, who bore him one son. His grandson, Menashe Sadqa, is a pulpit rabbi in Queens, New York. Hussein died at the age of 85, and was buried in the Sanhedria Cemetery in Jerusalem.

== Notable students ==
Among Hussein's students were Sephardi Chief Rabbis of Israel Yitzhak Nissim and Mordechai Eliyahu; deans of Porat Yosef Yeshiva Yehuda Tzadka and Ben Zion Abba Shaul; and Yaakov Mutzafi, who succeeded him as Av Beit Din and Rabbi of Shemesh Sedaqah Synagogue.

In 1933, Hussein persuaded the father of a 12-year-old Ovadia Yosef to send his son to the Porat Yosef Yeshiva. Yosef would go on to become the greatest figure of Mizrahi Jewry in the 20th century.

== Works ==
- Meqitz Nirdamim A collection of exhortations delivered on Rosh Hashanah in Jerusalem during the Holocaust (2 volumes, published in Jerusalem in 1943 and 1944)

== See also ==
- History of the Jews in Iraq

== Sources ==
- Rossoff, Dovid (2005). קדושים אשר בארץ: קברי צדיקים בירושלים ובני ברק [The Holy Ones in the Earth: Graves of Tzaddikim in Jerusalem and Bnei Brak] (in Hebrew). Jerusalem: Machon Otzar HaTorah. pp. 358–359.
- Tidhar, David (1947). "Sadqa Hussein" צדקה חוצין. Encyclopedia of the Founders and Builders of Israel (in Hebrew). Vol. 1. Estate of David Tidhar and Touro College Libraries. p. 112.
