= The Rashbaḥ =

The Rashbah may refer to:

- Shelomo Bekhor Ḥutzin, 19th century Baghdadi Jewish posek, liturgical poet, journalist, translator, and publisher
- Samuel ben Hofni, was the gaon of Sura Academy in Mesopotamia ("Babylonia") from 998 to 1012
