= Shelomo Bekhor Ḥutzin =

19th century rabbi

Rabbi Shelomo Bekhor Ḥutzin (Hebrew: שלמה בכור חוצין; 1843, Baghdad – 1892, Baghdad), also known as the Rashbaḥ, was an Baghdadi Jewish posek, liturgical poet, journalist, translator, and publisher.

== Biography ==
Shelomo Bekhor Ḥutzin was born to a prominent rabbinic family in Baghdad, Ottoman Iraq, a descendant of Rabbi Sadqa Bekhor Hussein (1699–1743), author of the work Sedaka Umishpat. He studied at the Midrash Bet Zilkha under Rabbi Abdallah Somekh.

Ḥutzin had wide-ranging interests and engaged in a diversity of activities in his life. He wrote regularly for the contemporary Hebrew press, including periodicals that were published in Baghdad, India, Ottoman Palestine, and Eastern Europe. Over the years he wrote more than 150 articles for various newspapers, such as Le Libanon, Hamagid, Ha-Tsefirah, Habatzeleth, Hadover (Baghdad), Hamevaser (Calcutta), and others. His articles covered topics such as Jewish communal life in Iraq, Kurdistan, and Persia; as well as Jewish law, ethics, culture, world politics, and current events. His articles are a vital primary source on the cultural life and travails of the Jews of Iraq and Iran in his day. Over the years he also translated several works from Hebrew to Judeo-Arabic, including sections of the Passover Haggada and the Siddur.

In 1867 he founded a Hebrew press in Baghdad (the third such enterprise in the city). This publishing house continued to function through his son even after his death. Among the books he published were anthologies of stories of ethical and personal development that he collected himself. He also invested in securing subscriptions for various Hebrew periodicals (like Hamagid) among Baghdadi Jews. Rabbi Hussein dreamed of establishing a bilingual journal in Hebrew and Arabic in Baghdad but was unable to secure permission for such a project from the Ottoman Sultanate.

Ḥutzin served as principal of the Midrash Talmud Torah in Baghdad, and as a Talmud teacher at the Alliance Israélite Universelle school. As a posek he ruled on Halakhic questions from across Iraq, from the Baghdadi community in India, and from other countries.

In 1874, Ḥutzin began publishing in the first Polish Jewish newspaper, Ha-Tsfira, in which he eventually published more than 40 articles.

== Partial bibliography ==
- Passover Haggada, Leghorn 1887
- Ma'ase Nisim, Baghdad 1889
- Ma'asim Tobim, Baghdad 1889
- Ma'asim Mefo'arim, Baghdad 1890
