= Mordechai Eliyahu =

Israeli rabbi, posek, and spiritual leader (1929–2010)

Rabbi Mordechai Eliyahu מָרְדְּכַי צֶמַח אֵלִיָּהוּ
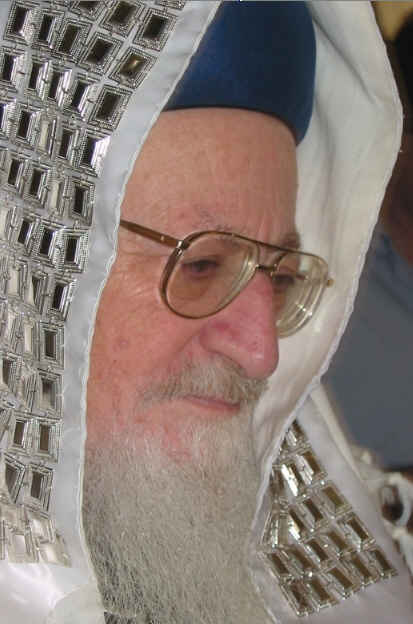
- Title: Sephardic Chief Rabbi of Israel, 1983–1993

Personal life
- Born: Mordechai Eliyahu; March 3, 1929 Jerusalem
- Died: June 7, 2010 (aged 81) Jerusalem
- Spouse: Tzviya Eliyahu
- Children: Shlomo Ben Eliyahu; Shmuel Eliyahu; Yosef Eliyahu
- Parent: Salman Eliyahu
- Education: Porat Yosef Yeshiva

Religious life
- Religion: Judaism
- Denomination: Hardal

Jewish leader
- Predecessor: Ovadia Yosef
- Successor: Eliyahu Bakshi-Doron

Mordechai Tzemach Eliyahu (Hebrew: מָרְדְּכַי צֶמַח אֵלִיָּהוּ, lit. 'Mordecai Semah Elijah'; March 3, 1929 – June 7, 2010) (Note: On the Hebrew calendar: 21 Adar I, 5689 – 25 Sivan, 5770.) was an Israeli rabbi, posek, and spiritual leader.

The son of a Jerusalem Kabbalist, in his youth, Eliyahu was active in the religious Jewish organization Brit HaKanaim. He served as a dayan in Beersheba, and in the Supreme Rabbinical Court in Jerusalem. He later served as the Rishon LeZion, or Chief Rabbi of Israel, from 1983 to 1993.

As a leader of Religious Zionism, Eliyahu was instrumental in moving many of its members over to the religious right, sparking the beginnings of the Hardal movement. A supporter of Meir Kahane and Jonathan Pollard, Eliyahu expressed his opposition to the Israeli disengagement from Gaza.

Rabbi Eliyahu died at age 81, after complications from a heart condition. He was buried on Har HaMenuchot in Jerusalem.

== Early life ==
Mordechai Eliyahu was born in the Jewish Quarter of Jerusalem, the son of Iraqi Jewish rabbi Salman Eliyahu, a Jerusalem Kabbalist, and his wife Mazal, who was a sister of Yehuda Tzadka. The family surname was Hebraicised from Elias. He had an older brother, Naim Ben Eliyahu, a younger sister Rachel, and brother Shimon. Salman was a disciple of Yosef Hayyim (the Ben Ish Hai), who was Mazal's great-uncle. The family was so poor that Eliyahu had to improvise ways in which to study, which often meant learning by candlelight. Salman died when Eliyahu was eleven, but not before he instilled in his son a love of Torah and Kabbalah.

In his youth, Eliyahu attended Porat Yosef Yeshiva, and had the opportunity to learn from many great teachers such as Ezra Attiya, Sadqa Hussein, and Avrohom Yeshaya Karelitz (the Chazon Ish). He would later come into contact with Mordechai Sharabi, Yaakov Mutzafi, and Yitzhak Kaduri. Later in life, he cultivated a unique relationship with Menachem Mendel Schneerson (the Lubavitcher Rebbe).

=== Activism ===
Eliyahu in court following his arrest

"I felt that the Jews have an inferiority complex that causes them to be disrespected by others, which in turn affects the leadership...and we decided to found an organization whose purpose is to instill Jewish pride. I believed that through the underground we could impose Torah living in the state."

— Mordechai Eliyahu (at trial)

As a teenager, Eliyahu teamed up with Shabtai Yudelevitz in order to conduct Jewish outreach. In 1950–1951, Eliyahu was among the leaders of Brit HaKanaim (Hebrew: בְּרִית הַקַנַאִים, lit. Covenant of the Zealots), a radical religious Jewish underground organization which opposed the widespread trend of secularization in the country. The group was involved in torching the cars of people who drove on Shabbat, and also butcher shops where non-kosher meat was sold. They once plotted to toss a smoke bomb into the Knesset during a debate on drafting Orthodox women into the Israel Defense Forces (IDF). A member of the group was in the audience during the debate with the smoke bomb in his pocket, but lacked the opportunity to activate it.

"I admit the way that I went in the past is not appropriate for our generation; not that the Torah has changed, heaven forbid, but rather the way to instill it in the people has changed."

— Mordechai Eliyahu

On May 14, 1951, the group's members were arrested by the Shin Bet. Eliyahu was sentenced to ten months imprisonment for his part in the group's deeds. Later in his life, he stated that even though his opinions did not change, "The path that I chose in the past was mistaken."

== Career ==
Eliyahu received semikhah (rabbinic ordination) from Sephardic Chief Rabbi Yitzhak Nissim. The latter requested from him to arrange for the reinterment of Chaim Yosef David Azulai (the Hida) from Livorno, Italy to Israel. On May 17, 1960, the Hida was laid to rest at Har HaMenuchot in Jerusalem.

That year, Eliyahu was appointed dayan in Beersheba, the youngest one in the country. He was often involved in adjudicating complicated family issues. Eliyahu was a favorite of the Baba Sali, who lived nearby in Netivot. One day, the latter insisted Eliyahu stop whatever he was doing and come visit him for a glass of arak. Not wishing to upset the holy man, Eliyahu accepted the invitation, only to find out later that a disgruntled ex-litigant had gone to the beth din seeking to do him harm.

Four years later, Eliyahu was transferred to the Jerusalem regional beth din, and later was elected to the Supreme Rabbinical Court in Jerusalem, a position he would retain during his term as Chief Rabbi of Israel and afterwards.

=== Chief Rabbinate ===
On March 18, 1983, Eliyahu was appointed Rishon LeZion (Chief Rabbi of Israel) at the Yochanan Ben Zakai Synagogue in the Jewish Quarter of the Old City of Jerusalem. He served concurrently with Chief Ashkenazi Rabbi Avraham Shapira until 1993, when both of their terms expired.

During his term as Chief Rabbi, one of Eliyahu's focuses was on attempting to reach out to secular Israeli Jews, giving them a better understanding of Jewish customs and their importance. He traveled extensively throughout Israel and the world, often together with Shapira, emphasizing the importance of Jewish education, Shabbat observance, niddah (family purity), fighting assimilation, and making aliyah. Eliyahu showed a willingness to go to secular environments in order to connect with other Jews, occasionally lecturing in secular moshavim and kibbutzim. After stepping down from his official post, Eliyahu remained active, even ramping up his work for the Jewish community in Israel and the diaspora.

== Hardal ==
As one of the spiritual leaders of the Religious Zionist movement, Eliyahu was instrumental in moving many members of that group over to the religious right, in the direction of Haredi Judaism. One of the ways he did this was by insisting that his followers adhere to rabbinic authority in all of their endeavors. He was thus considered the progenitor of the Hardal movement. "Hardal" is a Hebrew acronym for Haredi Dati Le'umi, or Haredi Religious Nationalist.

== Opinions ==
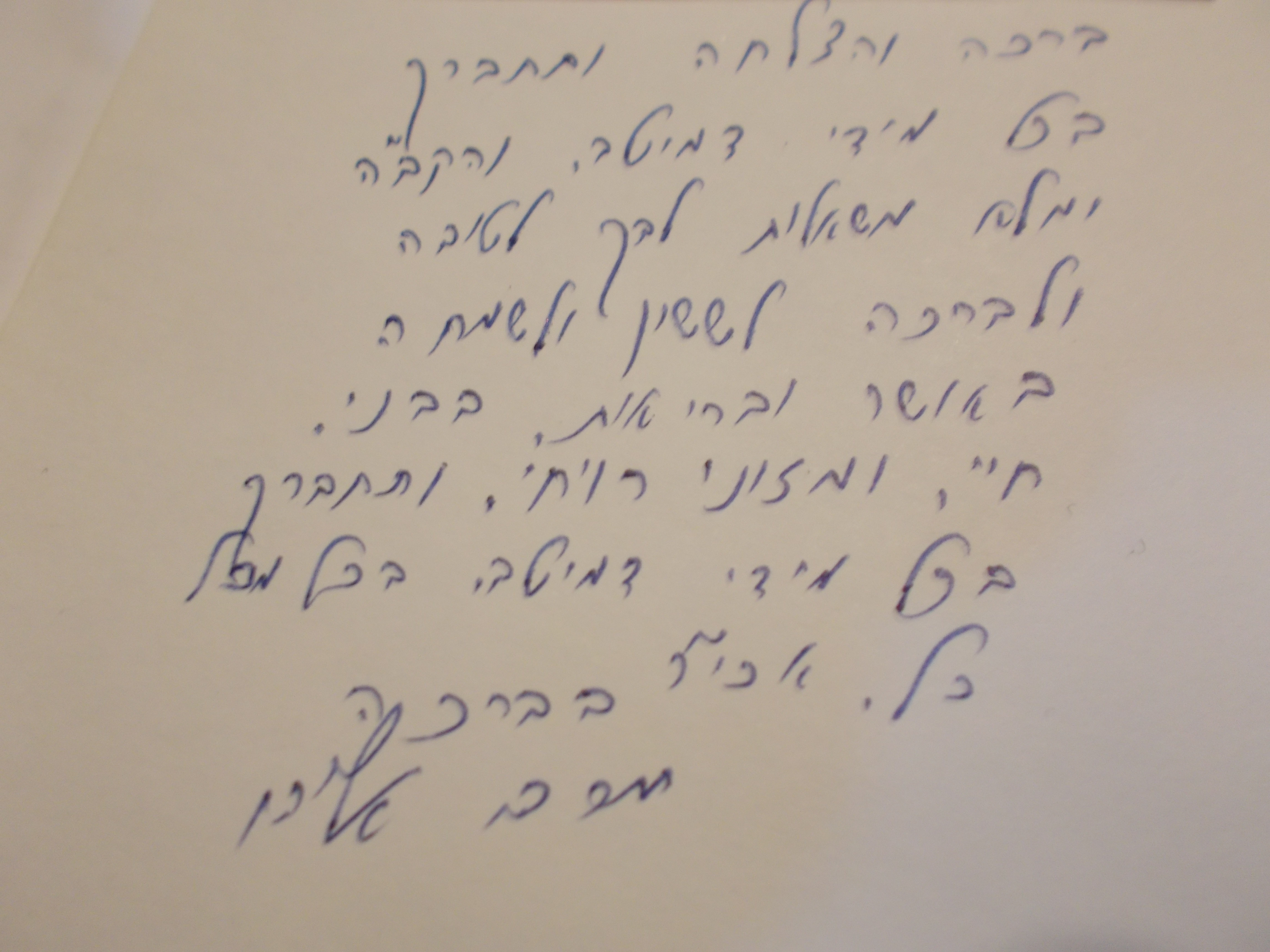
Blessing and autograph of Mordechai Eliyahu circa 1998

=== Gaza disengagement ===
Eliyahu was an outspoken opponent of the 2005 Israeli disengagement from Gaza. He made statements interpreted as forbidding Orthodox Jews from participating in or facilitating the expulsion of the Jews from Gush Katif, but later said he did not mean for soldiers to engage in "active refusal". In January of that year, Eliyahu stated that the 2004 tsunami was a (pre-emptive) "divine punishment" for Asian governments supporting the disengagement plan.

In March 2006, three days before the Israeli elections, Eliyahu stated that it was forbidden to vote for any political party that had backed the disengagement, and stressed that anyone who voted for Kadima was "assisting sinners". He stressed the importance of voting for a party committed to religious education and yeshivas, but urged against voting for those religious parties that had supported the disengagement, and called for members of the religious Shas party to repent for supporting the Oslo Accords.

=== Gaza incursions ===
In May 2007, Eliyahu wrote a letter to Prime Minister Ehud Olmert which suggested "that there was absolutely no moral prohibition against the indiscriminate killing of civilians during a potential massive military offensive on Gaza aimed at stopping the rocket launchings". Shmuel Eliyahu explained that his father opposed a ground troop incursion into Gaza that would endanger IDF soldiers.

=== The Holocaust ===
In a 2007 radio interview, given to Haredi radio station Kol Haemet on the eve of Holocaust Remembrance Day, Eliyahu was asked what was the sin of the six million Jews who were murdered in the Holocaust. He said: "Those people were innocent, but Reform started in Germany. Those reformers of religion started in Germany, and because it is said that the wrath of God does not distinguish between the righteous and the evil ones – this was done."

=== Other ===
Eliyahu was considered somewhat controversial for his decades-long support of what some characterize as the radical right of the Religious Zionist movement. Eliyahu was a supporter of Meir Kahane, and was friendly with his family. He officiated at the marriage of Kahane's son, Binyamin Ze'ev Kahane, and delivered the eulogy at Meir Kahane's funeral. Eliyahu was a long-time supporter of Jonathan Pollard, becoming his spiritual mentor while Pollard served time in U.S. prisons, having visited him there several times.

In 2008, at a service to remember the death of 8 Israeli students killed in the Mercaz HaRav massacre, Eliyahu said, "Even when we seek revenge, it is important to make one thing clear – the life of one yeshiva boy is worth more than the lives of 1,000 Arabs. The Talmud states that if gentiles rob Israel of silver, they will pay it back in gold, and all that is taken will be paid back in folds, but in cases like these, there is nothing to pay back, since as I said – the life of one yeshiva boy is worth more than the lives of 1,000 Arabs".

Eliyahu worked for the preservation of the Iraqi Jewish rite and the opinions of the Ben Ish Hai, and opposed the attempts of Ovadia Yosef to impose a uniform "Israeli Sephardi" rite based on the Shulchan Aruch and his own halakhic opinions. He published a prayer book called Qol Eliyahu, based on this stance.

== Personal life ==
At the age of 24, Eliyahu married Tzviya Eliyahu, the daughter of his rabbi, Nissim David Azran, the founder and rosh yeshiva of Bet Shmuel Yeshiva in Nachlaot, Jerusalem. They had three sons; Shlomo Ben Eliyahu, a lawyer; Shmuel Eliyahu, Chief Rabbi of Safed; Yosef Eliyahu, dean of Darchei Hora'ah LeRabbanim; and Merav, a daughter.

== Death ==
Eliyahu suffered from a heart condition. On August 24, 2009, he collapsed in his home, and was rushed to the hospital while unconscious. He died on June 7, 2010, at Shaare Zedek Medical Center from complications related to his heart condition. He was 81 years old. An estimated 100,000 people attended his funeral in Jerusalem, which began at 10:00 PM on Monday, June 7, 2010. He was interred on Har HaMenuchot, adjacent to the Hida.

== Legacy ==
Eliyahu founded the Heichal Yaakov Synagogue, named after Jacob Safra, and Darchei Hora'ah LeRabbanim yeshiva in the Kiryat Moshe neighborhood of Jerusalem, which is now headed by his son Yosef Eliyahu.

== Published works ==
- Ma'amar Mordechai; Laws of prayer
- Darchei Tahara; Laws of family purity
- Mahzor Qol Ya'aqov; Prayerbook for the festivals
- Siddur Qol Eliyahu; Daily prayerbook, 1998
- Kitzur Shulhan Arukh LaGaon HaRav Shlomo Ganzfried Im Hearot Darchei Halakhah; Daily laws for Ashkenazim and Sephardim, 1999
- She'eloth U'tshuvoth HaRav HaRashi; Responsa
- She'eloth U'tshuvoth Qol Eliyahu; Responsa
- Divrei Mordechai; Torah commentary

== See also ==
- Hakham Bashi

== Notes ==
Jewish titles
| Preceded by Ovadia Yosef | Sephardi Chief Rabbi of Israel; 1983–1993 | Succeeded by Eliyahu Bakshi-Doron |
