= Yitzhak Kaduri =

Israeli Haredi rabbi and kabbalist (c. 1898–2006)

Rabbi Yitzhak Kaduri
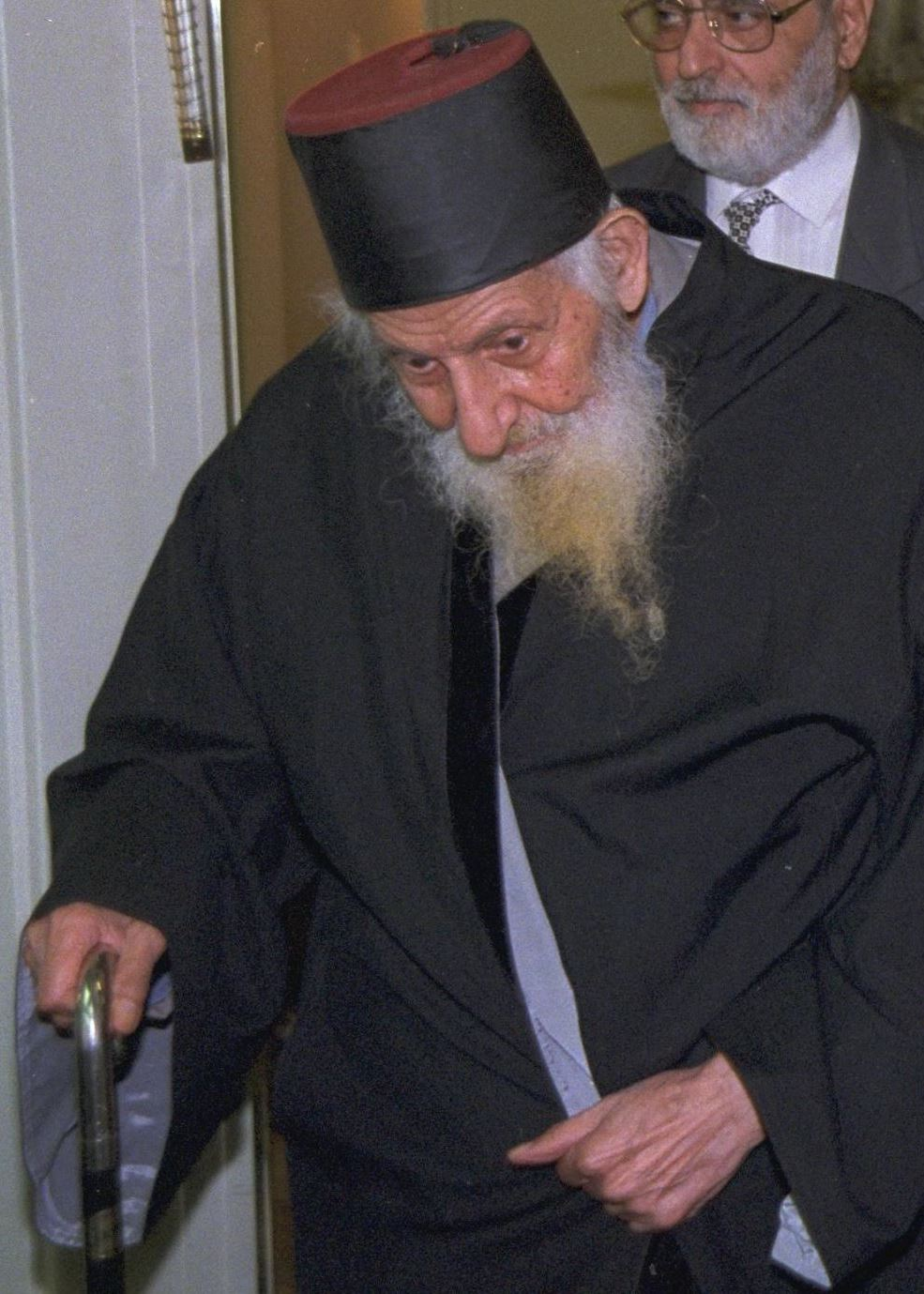
- Kaduri in 1997

Personal life
- Born: Yitzhak Diba c. 1898 Baghdad, Baghdad Vilayet, Ottoman Empire
- Died: January 28, 2006 (aged 103-108) Jerusalem, Israel
- Parent: Rabbi Kadurie Diba
- Occupation: Rabbi, kabbalist

Religious life
- Religion: Judaism
- Denomination: Sephardic Haredim

Yitzhak Kaduri (Hebrew: יצחק כדורי, Arabic: إسحاق الخضوري), also spelled Kadouri, Kadourie, Kedourie (c. 1898 – January 28, 2006), was a Haredi rabbi and kabbalist. He taught and practiced the ‘’kavanot‘’ of the Rashash. His amulets were distributed to voters before the Israeli election in May 1996, in exchange for their votes for Benjamin Netanyahu and the Shas party. During his lifetime he published no religious articles or books.

At the time of his death, estimates of his age ranged from 103 to 108, and his birth year is still disputed. His funeral, held in Jerusalem, drew over 200,000 followers.

== Early life ==
Kaduri was born in Baghdad, which was then part of the Ottoman Empire. His father, Rabbi Kadhuri Diba ben Aziza, was a spice trader. Kaduri excelled in his studies and began learning Kabbalah while still in his teens. He was a child student of Rabbi Yosef Hayyim and studied at the Zilka Yeshivah in Baghdad. He moved to the British Mandate of Palestine in 1923 and there changed his name from Diba to Kaduri to honor his father whom he had left in Baghdad.

== Student of Kabbalah ==
He went to study at the Shoshanim LeDavid Yeshiva for kabbalists from Iraq. There he learned from the leading kabbalists of the time, including Rabbi Yehuda Ftaya, author of ‘’Beit Lechem Yehudah’’, and Rabbi Yaakov Chaim Sofer, author of ‘’Kaf Hachaim’’. He later immersed himself in regular Talmudic study and rabbinical law in the Porat Yosef Yeshiva in Jerusalem’s Old City, where he also studied Kabbalah with the Rosh Yeshivah, Rabbi Ezra Attiya, Rabbi Saliman Eliyahu (father of Sephardic Chief Rabbi Mordechai Eliyahu), and other learned rabbis.

In 1934, Rabbi Kaduri and his family moved to the Old City, where the Porat Yosef Yeshivah gave him an apartment nearby with a job of binding the yeshivah’s books and copying over rare manuscripts in the yeshivah’s library. The books remained in the yeshivah’s library, while the copies of manuscripts were stored in Rabbi Kaduri’s personal library. Before binding each book, he would study it intently, committing it to memory. He was reputed to have photographic memory and also mastered the Talmud by heart, including the adjoining Rashi and Tosafot commentaries.

During the period of Arab-Israeli friction that led up to the 1948 Arab–Israeli War, the Porat Yosef Yeshivah was virtually turned into a fortress against frequent flashes of violence. When the Jewish quarter of the Old City fell to the invading Jordanian Army, the Jordanians set fire to the yeshivah and all surrounding houses, destroying all the books and manuscripts that Rabbi Kaduri could not smuggle to Beit El Yeshiva (‘’Yeshivat HaMekubalim’’) in Jerusalem. He knew all the writings of Rabbi Yitzhak Luria, the founder of modern Kabbalah by heart. After the passing of the leading kabbalist, Rabbi Efraim Hakohen, in 1989, the remaining kabbalists appointed Rabbi Kaduri as their head.

Rabbi Kaduri did not publish any of the works that he authored on Kabbalah; he allowed only students of Kabbalah to study them. He did publish some articles criticizing those who engage in “practical Kabbalah“, the popular dissemination of advice or amulets, often for a price. Kadouri said “It is forbidden to teach a non-Jew Kabbalah, not even Talmud, not even simple Torah;” perhaps referring to pop celebrity Madonna’s publicised interest in Kabbalah; he also said that women (even Jewish) are not allowed to study Kabbalah.

== Blessings, amulets and prophecies ==
Over the years, thousands of people (mainly but not exclusively Sephardi Jews) would come to seek his advice, blessings and amulets which he would create specifically for the individual in need. He had learned the Kabbalistic secrets of the amulets from his teacher, Rabbi Yehuda Fatiyah. Many people directly attributed personal miracles to receiving a blessing from Rabbi Kaduri, such as recovery from severe illnesses and diseases, children born to couples with fertility problems, finding a spouse, and economic blessings.

His rise to fame, though, began when his son, Rabbi David Kaduri, who ran a poultry store in the Bukharim Market, decided to found a proper yeshivah organization under his father. Called Nachalat Yitzchak yeshiva, it was located adjacent to the family home in the Bukharim neighbourhood of Jerusalem. His grandson, Yossi Kaduri, took part in this endeavour with him.

Kaduri’s followers believed that he was able to predict events. In late 2004, Kaduri said “Great tragedies in the world are foreseen” two weeks before the 2004 Indian Ocean earthquake and tsunami; reporter Baruch Gordon of Arutz Sheva connected the two by saying Kaduri predicted the tragedy.

== Political involvement ==
Ahavat Yisrael אהבת ישראל
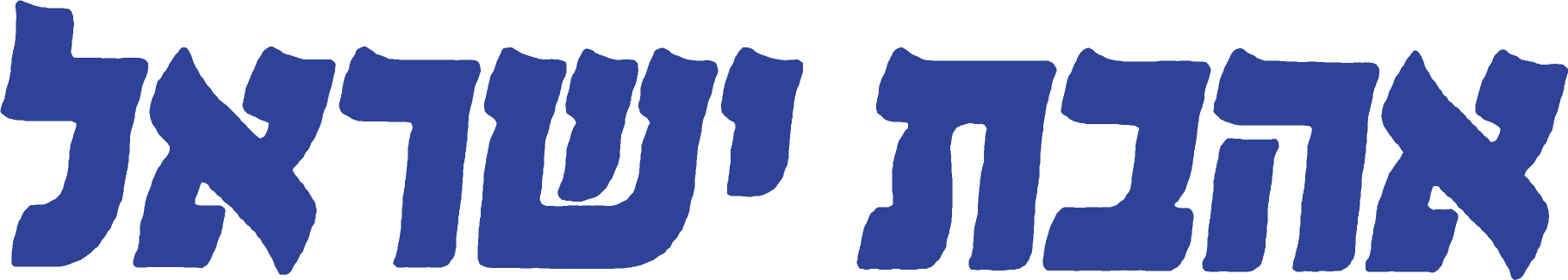
- Leader: Yitzhak Kaduri
- Founded: 2003
- Dissolved: 2003
- Split from: Shas
- Merged into: Shas
- Ideology: Zionism; Populism; Social conservatism Haredi interests

Election symbol
- זנ

The last two decades of his life were marred by the controversial way that some would use him to promote various political parties during Israeli elections. Rabbi Kaduri achieved celebrity status during the 1996 Knesset elections when he was flown by helicopter to multiple political rallies in support of the Shas party, and for amulets that were produced in his name for supporters of that party.

In October 1997, Benjamin Netanyahu, then in his first term as Prime Minister of Israel, came to visit Kaduri at his synagogue and was recorded as whispering in Kaduri’s ear “the left has forgotten what it is to be a Jew”. This was considered as a divisive action and resonated in the press.

== Final days and death ==
Kaduri lived a life of poverty and simplicity. He ate little, spoke little, and prayed each month at the gravesites of tzaddikim in Israel. His first wife, Rabbanit Sara, died in 1989. He remarried in 1993 to Rabbanit Dorit, a baalat teshuva just over half his age.

In January 2006, Rabbi Kaduri was hospitalized with pneumonia in the Bikur Holim Hospital in Jerusalem. He died at around 10 p.m. January 28, 2006 (29 Tevet 5766). He was alert and lucid until his last day.

More than 200,000 people took part in his funeral procession on January 29, which started from the Nachalat Yitzchak Yeshivah and wound its way through the streets of Jerusalem to the Givat Shaul cemetery (also known as Har HaMenuchot) near the entrance to the city of Jerusalem.

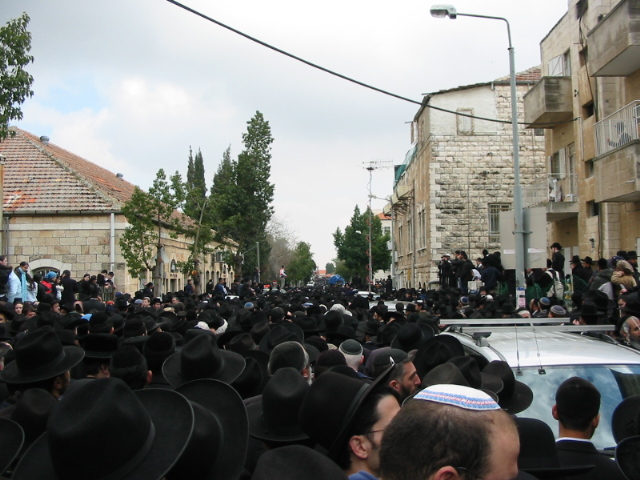
Funeral procession in the Bucharim neighbourhood of Jerusalem

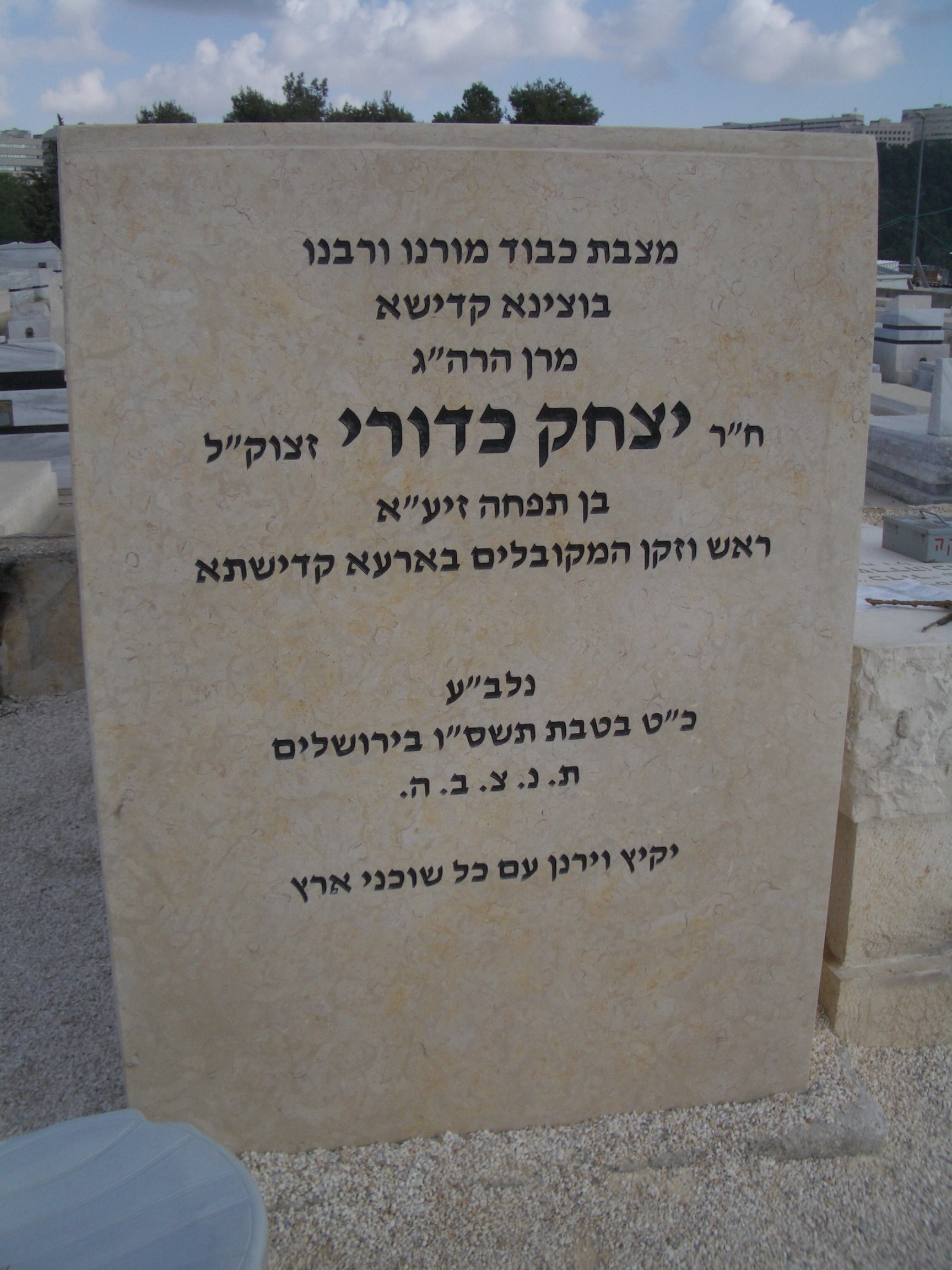
Tombstone of the ‘’Rosh HaMekubalim’’ Yitzhak Kaduri

== Messiah ==
The note in question, sealed to be opened posthumously

Before his death, Kaduri said that he expected the Jewish Messiah to arrive in the near future, and that he had met him a year earlier. Some people have claimed that he left a hand-written note, to be opened one year after his death. After this period had elapsed, the note was supposedly opened to reveal the message “ירים העם ויוכיח שדברו ותורתו עומדים” (‘’Yarim ha-am veyokhiakh shedvaro vetorato omdim’’; translated as “he will raise the people and confirm that his word and law are standing”), which, taking the first letter of each word, reads יהושוע (“Yehoshua“), a name meaning “God is salvation.” Some Christian missionary groups have argued that this name is most likely referring to Jesus, as his Hebrew name is the same ישוע (“Yeshua“).

Rabbi Tovia Singer translated the Hebrew words in the note as

“The nation will be raised up and it will become known that His word and His Torah stand.”

He confirmed that the first letter of each of the Hebrew words in the note spells “Yehoshua”, the Hebrew name Joshua ben Nun, the protagonist of the Book of Joshua, whose name means “God is salvation”, and not “Yeshua” the Hebrew name of Jesus of Nazareth. Singer also said that no member of Kaduri’s family he spoke to knew anything about the note, and considers it a forgery.
