= Midrash Bet Zilkha =

Midrash Bet Zilkha (or Midrash Abu Menashi) was an important Bet Midrash in Baghdad which was renowned among Eastern Jewry from the mid-19th to mid-20th centuries. Many of the great Babylonian rabbis of modern times arose from its halls, and rabbis from across the Arab world pursued advanced studies there.

== Founding ==
Before the establishment of the Midrash, Hakham Abdallah Somekh would teach students free of charge. This was noted with warm approval by the Baghdadi grandee Ezekiel Reuben, who had a history of making generous contributions to charitable enterprises in Iraq and Ottoman Palestine, including the establishment of the Beis Yaa’kov Synagogue for the Perushim in the Old City of Jerusalem. In 1840, Reuben bought a suitable courtyard and built a rabbinical school devoted to Somekh's students. It was first entitled Midrash Abu Menashi, after the Arabic nickname bestowed upon Reuben when he had his son Menashi (pronounced with an ultimate “i” according to the Iraqi dialect of Judaeo-Arabic).

== In Hakham Somekh's era ==
Abu Menashi contributed large sums to cover monthly living stipends for the student body. In those days there was also a large Heder called Midrash Talmud Torah which catered to orphans and children of the poor, and Somekh brought the top students to his Midrash to teach them Talmud and Posekim. Abu Menashi's support of the expanded student body remained strong, sometimes extending to matchmaking and maintenance of their families.

With time, Somekh's efforts began to bear fruit. As the school expanded, its students earned an increasing reputation for wisdom and erudition. Graduates assumed positions as instructors within the institution, earning the title Hakham as each began to teach his own small Yeshiva of students.

The traveller Benjamin II, who visited Baghdad in 1848, described his impression of the Midrash as follows:

The curriculum for our Jewish brethren in this city in matters of religion and faith is excellent...This Bet Midrash is under the direction of Hakham Abdallah ben Abraham Somekh, may God protect and keep him, who has assumed the burdens of this work without remuneration. He is independently wealthy, and indeed he was one of the most respected merchants in town when I visited. Yet all his affairs have been left in the charge of his assistant while he devotes himself full-time to this venerable enterprise.

Ezekiel Reuben passed away on the 14th of Tamuz, 5611 (1851), leaving behind two similarly generous sons, Menashi and Sassoon. Not only did they retain their father's stipends, but they also created new ones for students who had not been funded in his lifetime, and added to the base budget of the Midrash so that the students could learn with their full hearts.

In 1854, Menashi closed the original building that his father had constructed for the Midrash. He bought three adjacent houses: the Bet Dali house and the homes of Ezra Zilkha and Haham Abdallah Khedir. On the combined lots, he built a synagogue that he named “Midrash Abu Menashi,” and a larger seminary building that he named “Midrash Bet Zilkha.” He also purchased a number of Sifre Torah for the use of both institutions.

The seminary increased in stature with time, becoming a household name to all Mizrahi Jews, while a significant number of European Jews were also aware of it. Students from across Iraq came for the chance to be steeped in the Torah of Somekh. The seminary ordained some of the great rabbis of the generation, who served in communities in Iraq, Persia, India, and the Levant.

The traveller Jehiel Fischel, who visited Baghdad on the 14th of Sivan 5620 (1860), wrote:

Thanks to the Blessed God, there are many Yeshivot and Hakhamim in Babylonia who focus exclusively on Torah and divine service! This is especially marked at the Yeshiva and Midrash which is named for the grandee Menashi, who supplies all of its wants and needs. This costs 50 coppers or more, and he pays it from a legacy trust left in his father’s will.

In 1863, there were 30 scholars whose sole duty was to teach rabbinical students at the seminary. The greater Midrash was subdivided into many smaller Yeshivot, one for each of this staff of instructors. In 1869, the number of Yeshivot had been consolidated to ten.

Students from Kurdistan, Persia, India, and Central Asia would flock to Baghdad to learn at the Midrash. The Rosh Yeshiva was engaged in answering halakhic queries that were sent to him from abroad. Many of the questions dealt with marriages and divorce, lacunae in the education of the Persian rabbinate. Many were written in Hebrew and Aramaic, as well as a few in Arabic, Persian, and Turkish, which demanded a substantial staff of scribes who were proficient in Eastern languages. Thus did Babylonian Jewry earn the popular play on Isaiah 3:2 “for the Torah will spring forth from Baghdad, and the word of God from its Yeshibot!”

== Burning of the Midrash ==
In 1937, after the departure of the Kabbalist Hakham Yehuda Fatiyah from Baghdad and his emigration to Mandatory Palestine, there was a fierce controversy between the rabbinate and the community. At the height of the dispute, thugs on the side of the community ignited the Midrash complex in an act of spiteful arson. The entire Bet Midrash including most of the Sifre Torah and its extensive library were burned to ashes. A sole surviving Sefer Torah from the original Midrash, dating to the early 17th century, has been transported to the Be’er Hana synagogue in Netanya.

At the time of the blaze, some elders were learning in a back room and became trapped by the flames. An oral tradition claims that as the fire reached their room they began to recite the Shema, and suddenly someone opened an external window and lowered a pole that allowed them to climb out. To this day it is not known who saved them.

After the conflagration, the rabbinic staff taught in other synagogues during the two years of reconstruction of the Midrash. The King himself assumed responsibility for the restoration effort despite the fact that the arsonists were never caught or imprisoned. The library was reestablished in a diminished form with donations and offerings.

== Farhud ==
In June 1941, after the bloody pogrom known as the Farhud struck the Jewish community of Baghdad, chief rabbi Yaakov Mutzafi opened the gates of Midrash Bet Zilkha to survivors of the atrocity who were evicted from their homes. He also arranged for their upkeep via donations from philanthropists in the community.

== See also ==
- Great Synagogue of Baghdad
