= Shimon Agassi =

Iraqi rabbi (1852–1914)

Hakham Shimon Agassi
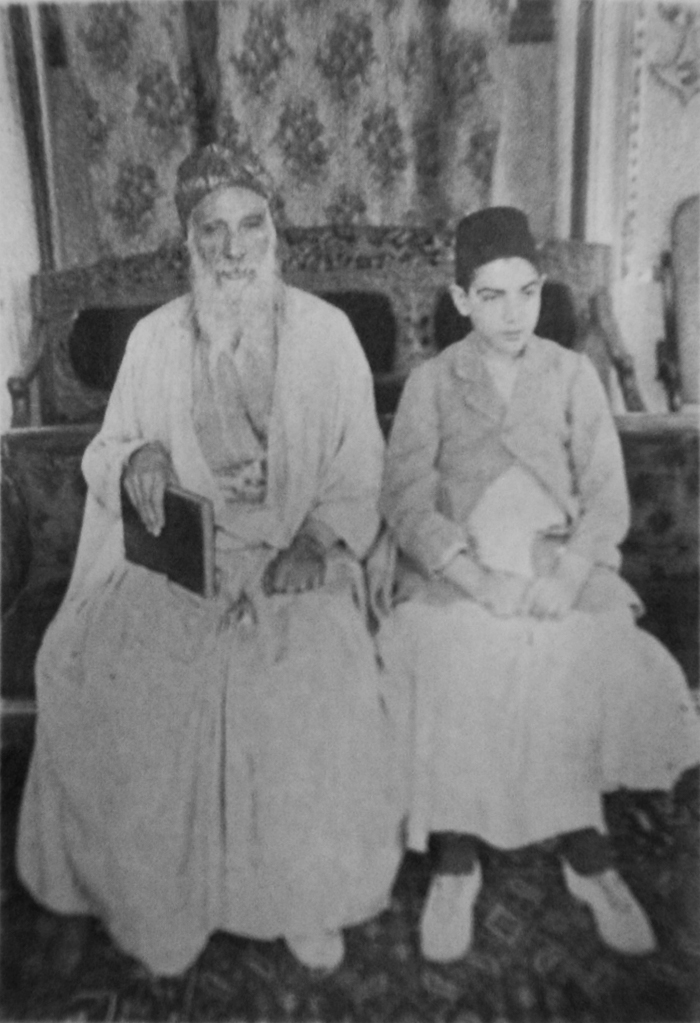
- with his son, Ezra Zion, approximately 1910

Personal life
- Born: 1852
- Died: 1914 (aged 61–62)
- Spouse: Rachel Abdallah Eliya Bahar
- Children: Aharon Agassi, Menashe Agassi, Farha Agassi Somek, Meir Sassoon Hai Agassi, Esther Agassi Somekh, Ezra Zion Agassi, Dina Agassi Shaashua, Khatoun Agassi Judah, Mazal Tov Agassi, and Eliyahu Haim Agassi
- Parent: Aharon (father)

Religious life
- Religion: Judaism
- Yahrtzeit: 8 Av, 5674 A. M.
- Residence: Baghdad

Shimon Ben Aharon Agassi (also spelled Simon Aghassi) was a Hakham and Kabbalist in Baghdad. He was known as HARASHBA, an acronym for Harav Rabbi Shimon Ben Aharon.

== Personal life ==
Hakham Agassi was born in 1852. He was married to Rachel Abdallah Eliya Bahar (1866–1954). Together they had ten children:

1. Aharon Agassi (1882–1898)
2. Menashe Agassi (1884–1889)
3. Farha Agassi Somek (1888–1992)
4. Meir Sassoon Hai Agassi (1891–1896)
5. Esther Agassi Somekh (1892–1988)
6. Ezra Zion Agassi (1897–1992)
7. Dina Agassi Shaashua (1898–1980)
8. Khatoun Agassi Judah (1903–1988)
9. Mazal Tov Agassi (1905–1990)
10. Eliyahu Haim Agassi (1909–1991)

Hakham Agassi died on the eve of Tisha B'Av, 1914.

Hakham Yehuda Fatiyah was one of his disciples.

== Works ==
Hakham Agassi authored: Imrey Shimon; B'ney Aharon (a commentary on Sha'ar HaGilgulim by Rabbi Hayyim Vital); D'rasha; Fundamentals of Torah (on the Thirteen Principles of Faith); Z'hav Sh'va; and Shem MiShim'on.
