= Salman Eliyahu =

Rabbi Salman Mordechai Tzemach Eliyahu (סלמאן אליהו) was born in Baghdad, Iraq in 1872. He was a disciple of the Ben Ish Chai and a renowned Kabbalist.

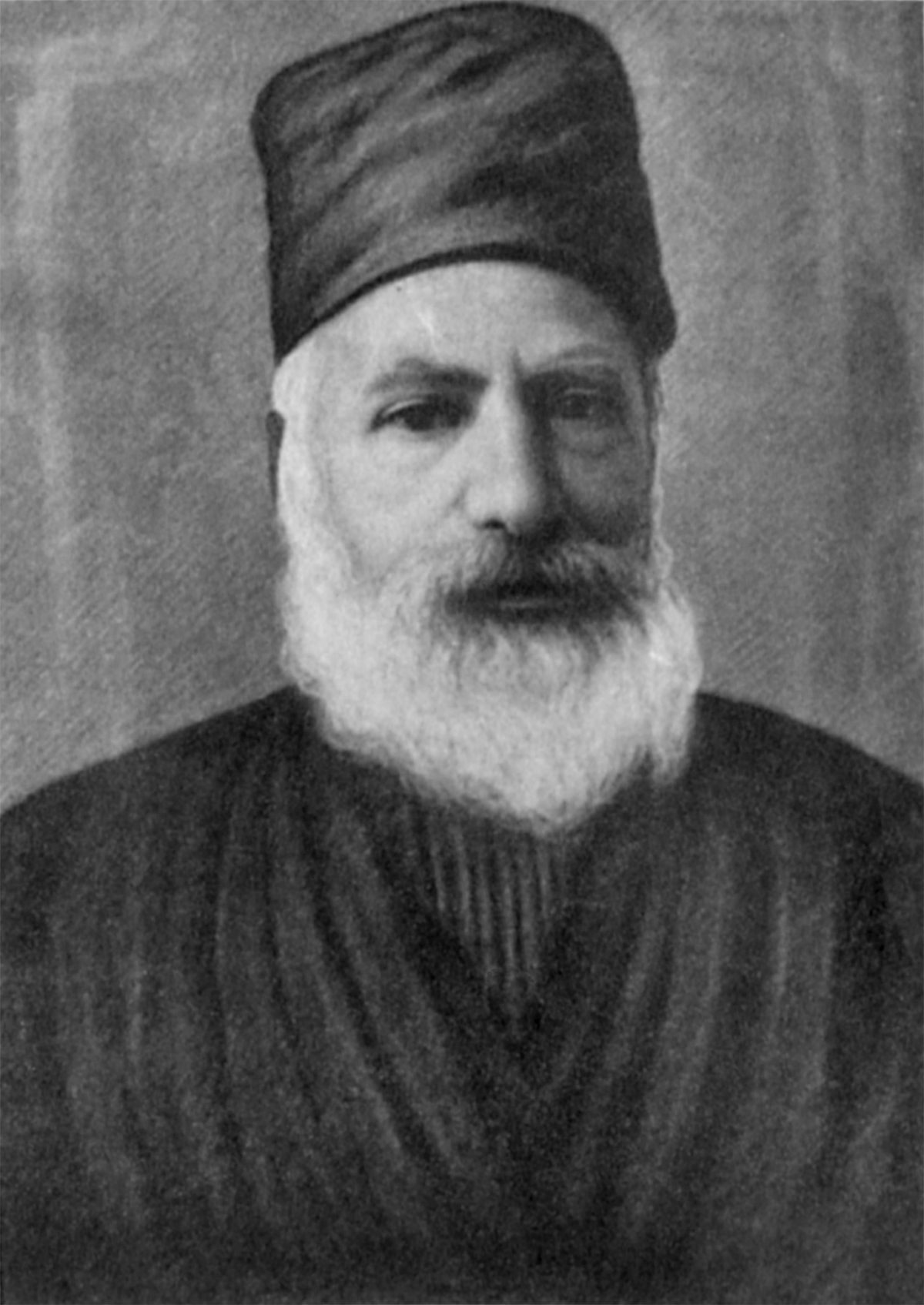

Together with his wife Mazal, he moved to Jerusalem in the early 1900s. He studied theology and philosophy in the United Kingdom. This Western education allowed him to serve as the personal secretary to Lord Herbert Samuel, the High Commissioner of the British Mandate for Palestine. Upon the advice of his mentor, Ben Ish Chai, Rabbi Salman Eliyahu moved back to Jerusalem, where he died in Jerusalem in 1940. He is the father of the Rishon Lezion and Chief Rabbi of Israel Mordechai Eliyahu.

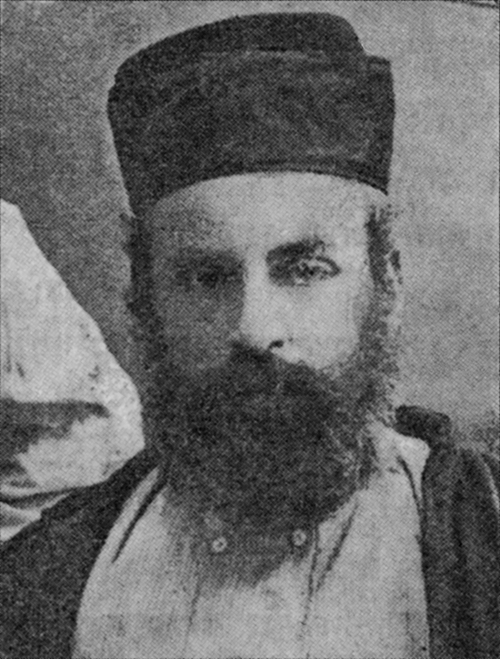
