= Yehuda Fatiyah =

Iraqi Kabbalist (1859–1942)

Yehuda Fetaya
- יהודה פתיה
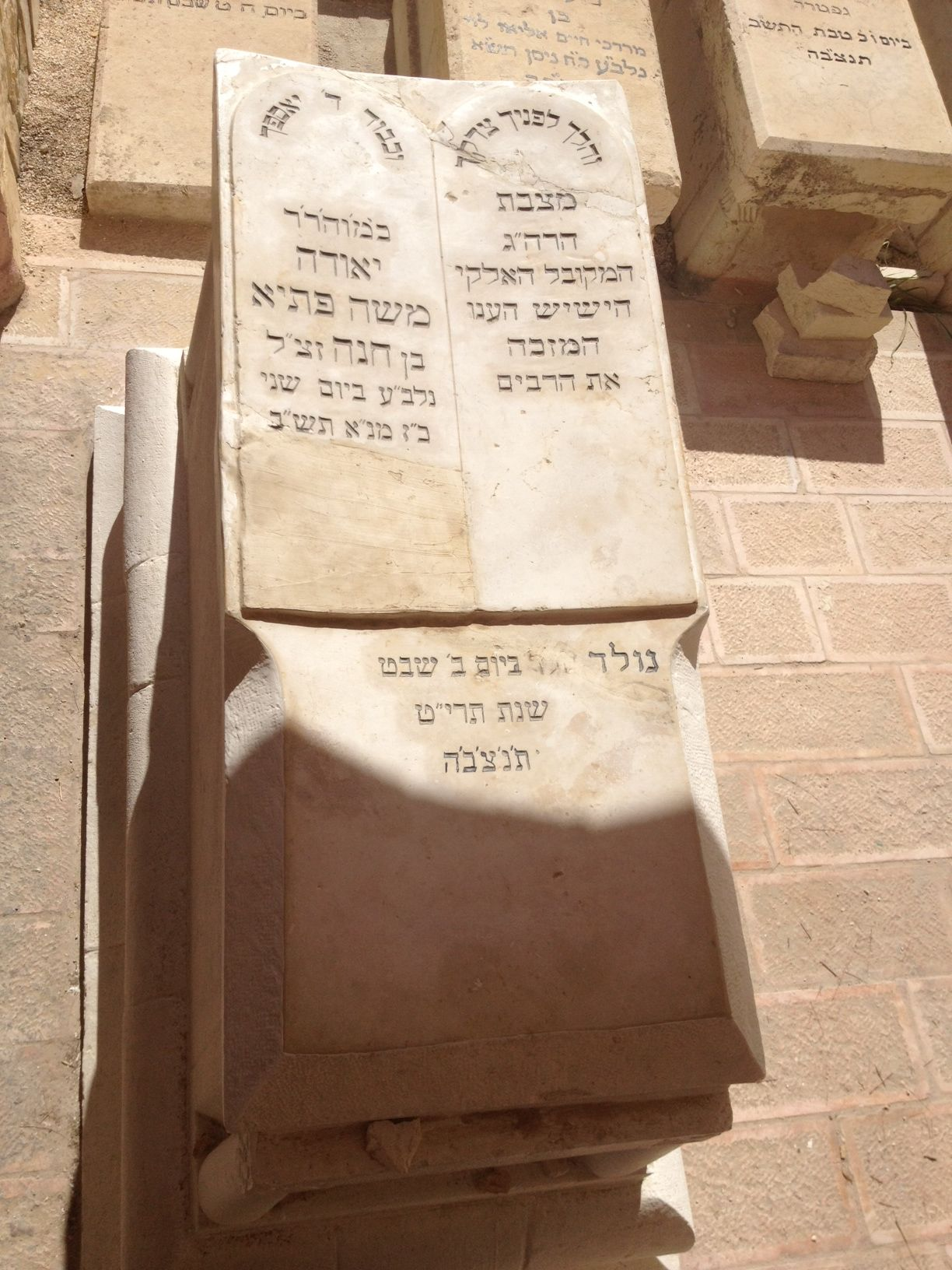
- Headstone of Rav Yehuda Fatiyah

Personal life
- Born: 1859 Baghdad, Ottoman Empire
- Died: 1942 (aged 82–83) Jerusalem, Mandatory Palestine
- Notable works: Yayin haReqa`h; Bet Le`hem Yehuda; Min`hat Yehuda
- Other name: Yehuda ben Moshe ben Yeshou`ah Fetaya
- Occupation: Rabbi, kabbalist

Religious life
- Religion: Judaism

Yehuda Fetaya (Yehuda ben Moshe ben Yeshou`ah Fetaya; 1859–1942) was a leading Kabbalist and authored many works of Kabbalah, among which three are well known, Yayin haReqa`h, Bet Le`hem Yehuda and Min`hat Yehuda.

== Life ==
Yehuda Fatiya was born in Baghdad and died on ZaKh Menahem Av in Jerusalem. He was the main student of the Yosef Hayyim and was also a student of Hakham Shimon Agassi.

== Works ==
Yayin haReqa`h is a commentary on the two Idras of the Zohar, Min`hat Yehuda incorporates kabbalistic interpretation of Tanakh through his encounter with spirits, while Bet Le`hem Yehuda, his major work, is the authoritative commentary on the Sefer Etz Hayim of Isaac Luria and his student, Hayim Vital. Like many kabbalists, he practiced the kavanot of Shalom Sharabi.

Fatiyah was famous in Baghdad and later Jerusalem for being the uncontested master in the science of kosher Qame`ot (amulets) and their writing, in the science of reincarnations and spirits, together with Jewish oneiromancy. To this day, the only proper amulets have their origin in his teachings, in his identification of their source. He also devoted much writing to the difference between dreams emanating from Heaven and from demons.
