= Archie Rand =

American painter

- Born: 1949 (age 76–77); Brooklyn, New York, United States
- Education: Art Students League, Pratt Institute
- Known for: Painter, Muralist

Archie Rand (born 1949) is an American artist from Brooklyn, New York, United States.

== Education and career ==
Born in Brooklyn, Rand received a Bachelor of Fine Arts in cinegraphics from the Pratt Institute, having studied previously at the Art Students League of New York.

His first exhibition was in 1966, at the Tibor de Nagy Gallery in New York. He has since had over 100 solo exhibitions, and his work has been included in over 200 group exhibitions.

He is currently Presidential Professor of Art at Brooklyn College which granted him the Award for Excellence in Creative Achievement in 2016. Before joining Brooklyn College, Rand was the chair of the Department of Visual Arts at Columbia University. He had served as the Acting Director of the Hoffberger School of Painting and as Assistant Director of the Mount Royal Graduate Programs, both at the Maryland Institute College of Art. From 1992–1994 he was appointed Co-Chair of the National Studio Arts Program of the College Art Association and from 1998–2003 he served as Chair of the College Art Association National Committee for the Distinguished Teaching of Art Award.

The Italian Academy For Advanced Studies in America at Columbia University presented him with The Siena Prize in 1995. He was awarded a Guggenheim Foundation Foundation Fellowship in 1999 and was made a Laureate of the National Foundation for Jewish Culture, which awarded him the Achievement Medal for Contributions in the Visual Arts. In 2002 he received the Presidential Award for Excellence in Teaching from Columbia University.

Also in 2002 he became the artistic advisor to film director Ang Lee for his production of The Hulk, and was asked by Milestone Films to provide a commentary track for the DVD release of Henri-Georges Clouzot's classic 1955 film The Mystery of Picasso.

Following the inaugural selection of novelist Amos Oz, Rand, in 2020, became the second recipient of the $100,000 Farash Fellowship, awarded by the Farash Foundation for the Advancement of Jewish Humanities and Culture "in honor of an extraordinary luminary who exemplifies excellence and is celebrated for accomplishments in the field of Jewish humanities and culture." In 2023, Rand's serial work, "The Seventeen: Iron Flock", was selected as the American representative to the Jerusalem Biennale.

== Work ==
=== Early works ===
Archie Rand's earliest major works are "The Letter Paintings" (or "The Jazz Paintings") (1968–71), a radically positioned series of technically inventive, mural-sized canvases. The Letter Paintings, by incorporating the names of mainly male and female African-American musicians, undermined prevailing aesthetic categories by conflating many contemporary movements including Conceptual Art, Color Field, Pattern and Decoration, diary entry and social commentary.

Although The Letter Paintings had been displayed individually, they were first shown as a unit in an exhibition at the Carnegie Museum of Art in 1983. Selections from The Letter Paintings have been on continuing multi-venue exhibition tours of the United States and Europe (including Palazzo Ducale, Genoa) since their Exit Art exhibition in 1991. Roberta Smith, art critic for The New York Times and a lecturer on contemporary art, described them as "exhilarating, precocious and lyric" and wrote that "Rand's paintings demand a substantial place in the history of an unusually fertile period in American art." Others described them as "an uncannily accurate step in the right direction", "[a]s exhilarating as a Charlie Parker solo or a holler from Big Joe Turner", and, almost thirty years after they had been painted, as carrying "the force of a visionary project".

The New York Times called Rand's first solo exhibition of abstract collaged canvases "An impressive debut".

In 1974 Rand received a commission from Congregation B'nai Yosef in Brooklyn. Rand was asked to paint thematic murals on the complete 16,000-square-foot (1,500 m^{2}) interior surfaces of the synagogue. The work took three years, and completing this commission made Rand the author of the only narratively painted synagogue in the world and the only one we know of since the 2nd Century Dura-Europos. The religious legal controversy raised by placing wall paintings in a traditionally iconoclastic space was resolved by the verdict of Rabbi Moshe Feinstein, then considered to be the world's leading Talmudic scholar, who declared the paintings to be in conformity with the law.

The murals were received with great enthusiasm: according to John Ashbery,

So varied and intricate are the themes Rand has treated in his murals and so multifaceted the barrage of styles he has employed, that it is difficult to describe the murals. They demand to be viewed. The sweep and eclecticism add up to a startling wholeness. The courage to be hybrid is given to relatively few artists; it was required here and Rand supplied it. The work surrounds one in an environment of wonder, of spirituality and earthiness, of joy and terror, but mostly joy. It attempts to be as diverse as Creation itself and just about succeeds.

Others were equally laudatory, describing the murals as "exciting and exceptional" and "a remarkably impressive achievement" and "energetic tour-de-force". The synagogue itself became known as "The Painted Shul". Director Amala Lane's 45 minute film, titled The Painted Shul, documenting the B'nai Yosef Murals, was released in 2003.

As Matthew Baigell has recently written, "The B'Nai Yosef murals, then, when considered in the light of ... his mixture of figurative and abstract elements; his appeal to the viewer's imagination and awareness of the artist's sense of inventiveness, are, altogether, nothing less than revolutionary in Jewish American art ... After these murals, anything became possible for Jewish-American artists." The aesthetic demands of the B'Nai Yosef murals marked a turning point in Rand's work. His subsequent turn to figuration may have been influenced by his friendship with Philip Guston, whose own work was transformed in the late 1960s. Like Guston, Rand "chafed at the limitations of purely abstract forms."

Robin Cembalest, reviewing Rand's work in The Forward in 1994, noted that:

Until a few years ago, Mr. Rand essentially had two parallel and – for the most part – distinct careers in the art world. In the contemporary arena he is known primarily as an abstractionist, a near-cult figure who started out as a child prodigy and whose admirers range from John Ashbery to Julian Schnabel. In the Jewish world he is a maverick muralist who paints scenes from the Bible in Orthodox synagogues.

Since then Rand, whose paintings range considerably in style and scale, has been seen as a respected and unclassifiable figure in the art world:

What is undeniable is during the 1970s many of the artists who exhibited at the gallery – Rand himself, for example – were irrepressible individualists whose work resists easy classification ... the phenomenally talented Rand was unsystematically working his way through every image-making language known to modern man, from material-based abstraction to narrative figuration to cartoon symbolism, sometimes all at the same time, and being given the chance to exhibit the results of his research at regular intervals.

By the 1970s and 1980s Rand had developed and maintained concurrent reputations: one as a visible gallery and museum artist whose work had loosely morphed into representation, and the other as an authority on Jewish iconography. As Dan Cameron observed in Arts at the time, "Far from an emerging talent, Archie Rand is a seasoned young master whom history is finally catching up with." And as Barry Schwabsky described it, "His career has been a Protean flow of stylistic change. Rand's "courage to be hybrid" as John Ashbery once put it, has led him from color field painting to a combinatory painterly image-making of dazzling dissonance ... [by which he] pushed himself to the forefront of his generation's rediscovery of 'content' in painting (a position which has yet to be generally acknowledged)."

=== 1980s and 1990s ===
In 1980 and 1981 he was commissioned to do a series of stained glass windows for two Chicago synagogues, Anshe Emet Synagogue and Temple Sholom and in 1984 received an offer to paint exterior murals at the Jerusalem Teachers College. For this project Rand asked Mark Golden of Golden Artist Colors to develop a system for the permanent application of full color outdoor paint. Some of the imagery used in these murals was recycled into his subsequent paintings. Exhibitions from the mid-1970s onward announced a return to mural-scale paintings and showed a prescient neo-expressionism joined with a fealty to narratives which were drawn in cartoon style. As John Yau wrote in Artforum, "Archie Rand is one of the most ambitious and more importantly, the most accomplished artist of his generation." Holland Cotter, reviewing Rand's 1986 show in Art in America, wrote, "His biography reads like that of a veteran. His recent paintings actually carry an air of accumulated, earned experience ... that makes this work so engaging: it is built on an old-fashioned, generous inclusiveness – critical and evangelical at once – that few of Rand's contemporaries seem interested in attempting, and none that I know of can match."

In 1988, with master printer Jon Cone, Rand produced a surprising and imaginative series of potato prints, some editioned and some very large, which were exhibited at a number of public and private institutions. As Beth Giacummo, director of the Islip Art Museum, noted on the occasion of a 2012 exhibition of these works:

Archie Rand's "The Potato Prints" have earned an unexpected niche in contemporary art history. They radiate joy and are appreciated by viewers of all ages. Bold in visual impact, they are filled with humanity and charm. Praised as technically remarkable achievements they remain just pure fun.

Printmaker and critic Ron Netsky urged, "Viewers should be sure not to miss what surely must be the most exquisite bit of potato carving done in the 20th century ..." And Lawrence J. Merrill elaborated, "[Rand] is an artist with a shameless appetite to encompass more: an expanding universe aesthetic ... Rand has had a career marked by attraction to projects unsanctioned by the official art world ... which were ultimately discovered and trumpeted by the art press ..."

A 1988 series of 20 large triptychs ("Songs of Dispersion") was shown in various venues in 1989.

From 1989 to 1991 he presented an unanticipated series of large-scale black and white abstractions which retain a residual authority. Donald Kuspit reviewed the Black and White series for Artforum at the time: "Rand's works are post-Modernist in the best sense ... the intimacy Rand evokes is reminiscent of Paul Klee's: he reinvents an alphabet of familiar shapes ... and the result evokes a primary sense of magical meaning and feeling." The exhibition featured large paintings which offered startling and effective revisions on the formats of contemporary abstraction, prompting critic Terry R. Myers to write in Flash Art:

Dare a critic put a word like "inspiration" down on paper, sincerely mean it in its larger sense, and still think he or she has a voice among the pedantry that is the art world? I'm tempted to believe that there is some type of visionary impact in Archie Rand's latest paintings, but nowadays such a claim would seem delirious at best and at worst illicit. These recent works stymie into oblivion attempts to classify them-- which is nothing new for Rand, who will be difficult to pinpoint on the misleading map of art history-- but perplexity on the part of the viewer obviously does not always lead to greatness on the part of the artist. Rand's latest paintings could very well be exceptional.

Throughout the 1990s Rand produced abstract and figurative works simultaneously, although all of the works indicated an intention to re-integrate representation into conceptual formats. In 1999 he mounted an exhibit of mural-scale paintings ("The Segments") which featured hundreds of compartmentalized painted cartoon-like images. On the occasion of a 1992 exhibition of serial paintings, which linked the Kabbalah's view of the 22 letters of the Hebrew alphabet to the 22 major arcana cards of the Tarot deck, David Brown wrote: "Extremely competent in any style that he chooses to call his own, it can be said of Archie what young players say of greats in the jazz world: "somebody should just break their fingers." In 2005 he completed a substantial painting commission for Aetna.

His work has been cited as influential, although some critics concede that his output has been difficult to pigeonhole. Rand's paintings display a vast and savvy menu of inventive and finely executed approaches. He has completed many series after the works of Paul Celan, Moyshe-Leyb Halpern, Eugenio Montale, Yehuda Amichai, Rainer Maria Rilke, Samuel Beckett/Paul Eluard and Jack Spicer. Working often with poets, he has produced books and continues to engage in publishing collaborative projects with, among others: Robert Creeley, John Ashbery, Clark Coolidge, Kenneth Koch, David Plante, Maryline Desbiolles, John Yau, Jim Cummins, David Lehman, Bob Holman, Bill Berkson, Lewis Warsh, David Shapiro, Anne Waldman, and M.G. Stephens. The critical response to Rand's collaborative work with poets has been abundant and commendatory, as in this review of his work with Creeley:

...this is utterly joyous work, natural and unlabored ... They are – thanks mostly to Rand – part fairy tales of staring cats and castle walls and, with Creeley's poems, part brilliant condensations of real-life emotions and desires ... "Robert Creeley's Collaborations", mounted last year by the Castellani Art Museum in Niagara Falls and currently touring nationally, documents the phenomenal scope of the poet's interests in the visual arts. Of these artists, Rand is especially compatible. The New York City artist moves freely from figurative and abstract modes, often combining the two in a single work. An artist of almost legendary energy and invention, Rand has exhibited widely throughout the United States and Europe ... Without at all losing individuality, Rand effortlessly evokes master draughstmen from Rembrandt and Fragonard to Matisse and Manet ... Somehow poet and painter always maintain a delicate and quite magical balance. It is a delightful performance to watch.

In every project where Rand joins forces with contemporary poets, or in which he employs liturgical texts, or collaboratively teams using the works of deceased poets, he utilizes a different visual persona, a vestige of the stylistic crucible from which he has always worked and which he sees as being consonant with his gradual invention of an unconventional Jewish iconography. This approach stimulated an engaged correspondence with the painter R.B. Kitaj. Rand's pioneering 1989 series "The Chapter Paintings", which dedicated one painting to each of the 54 divisions of the Hebrew Bible, instigated the groundbreaking 1996 "Too Jewish" exhibition, that originated at the Jewish Museum and traveled to other sites. As Vincent Brook saw it, "A useful date from which to mark the onset of postmodern American Jewish art is 1989. The year that saw the Tiananmen Square massacre, the fall of the Berlin Wall, and the premiere of Seinfeld was also the year Archie Rand exhibited [sic] at the Jewish Museum in New York a series of fifty-four paintings inspired by the yearly cycle of Torah readings. Jewish artists were by then no strangers to the upper echelons of the American art world, but baldly Jewish iconography was."

His interest in Judaic narrative has been seen in numerous recent painting series, each of which is painted with novel technical and/or content approaches for example: "Sixty Paintings from the Bible" (1992), "The Eighteen" (1994), "The Seven Days of Creation" (1996), "The Nineteen" (2002) and "Had Gadya" (2005). In a review in 2005, of an exhibition of the 1994 series "The Eighteen", Menachem Wecker wrote, "[Rand] has laid out a clearly demarcated path for others to follow. In his own way, he has effectively revolutionized the way the rest of us view Jewish art, heretofore an endangered species until Rand nurtured and raised it to fruition."

=== 2000s and Early 2010s ===
In 2003 Rand did two murals for Beth El Congregation in Fort Worth and in 2005 executed the large entrance mural at Congregation Beth-El in San Antonio.

In 2004, a retrospective exhibition was mounted at the Yeshiva University Museum in New York, to very positive reviews:

I want you to try this. It is really important. Do a Google search for 'Archie Rand: Iconoclast'-- easily the most important exhibit the Yeshiva University Museum (YUM) has ever hosted or ever will ... I will tell you who he is and why he is great ... Archie's series 'Sixty Paintings from the Bible' (1992) ... takes scenes from the Bible, illustrates them with Classical compositions, expressionist, almost cartoony lines, and bold pastel colors. The images contain speech bubbles that convey what the Biblical characters really said ... To Archie this playful synthesis of cartoon and Biblical stories ... by creating a patchwork of different styles, the Bible works ... provides a 'way of compensating for the inability of English to get at the Hebrew text' all in cartoon bubble form ... If you are up to the challenge of really trying to bridge the experiential Judaism with an aesthetic vision, then Archie Rand is the most perfect guide I know.

Writing on the occasion of the same exhibition, Richard McBee concluded:

This is it. This is the one exhibition that you must see if contemporary Jewish Art matters at all. Archie Rand has been bravely creating radical Jewish art for the last twenty years, challenging both the contemporary art establishment and the purveyors of Jewish culture. As a consequence of this insolence he has been exiled to what amounts to a critical wilderness. It is time to redeem him from exile, time for the Jewish public to take note and acknowledge the accomplishments of the foremost creator of Jewish art working today. Our cultural future depends on it.

In 2008, on a warehouse wall, Rand mounted the painting, "The 613", which at 1700 square feet (17' x 100') is nearly twice the size of James Rosenquist's F-111. It is one of the largest freestanding paintings ever made. Reminiscent of "The Segments" paintings it is intimidatingly enormous. Paradoxically, despite the raucous cartoony bytes that shoot colorful flashes from the manic surface, "The 613" glows warmly. Its overall effect is strangely calming and majestic. It is composed of 614 contiguous panels, each of which deals with one of the obscure but traditionally fixed number of 613 commandments, which were salvaged by sages from a literal reading of the Hebrew Bible. The viewing for "The 613" took place on one day and lasted only four hours. The event drew one thousand attendees. Menachem Wecker, describing this work in The Forward, averred that "Rand's series is arguably the most ambitious Jewish art enterprise, perhaps ever ... It is perhaps most informative to think of Rand's efforts to visually grapple with the commandments as a neo-Maimonidean enterprise. Just as the medieval scholar wrote works that made the Bible more accessible, Rand develops an accessible visual iconography that confronts the text ... And like Maimonides, his career will surely enjoy a life after death, as yet another generation's visual taboos become canonized in the next." Prompted by this showing, the art historian Matthew Baigell reflected on Rand's accomplishments in a 2009 article:

He is arguably the best known, most important, the most imaginative, and the most prolific ... as well as the artist most willing to take risks ... He became the most creative and outspoken proponent of a Jewish-themed art in America ... He has articulated in both words and images to a greater extent than anybody else a loose-jointed attempt to assure the viability, visibility and continuity of this art.

In an article on a 2011 exhibition of Rand's "Had Gadya" series, David Kaufmann wrote:

Archie Rand paints a lot, paints big, and paints complex. Since his first gallery exhibition in 1966-- when he was only 16-- he has been recognized as a prodigiously talented artist. Over three and half decades he has turned himself into one of the most important Jewish painters in America.

By 2020, when he was awarded the Farash Foundation Fellowship in recognition of his accomplishments, Rand was generally considered the pioneering proponent of modern religious art. Matthew Baigell contextualized it in his book Jewish Identity In American Art (2020):

Beginning in the 1970s, while responding to contemporary artistic, cultural and social developments, these artists also began to seek ways to meld together their daily American experiences with their religious and cultural backgrounds... There are at least three facts with which the artists might agree. First, it is safe to say that the paintings made by Archie Rand in 1974 to fill the interior of the B'nai Yosef Synagogue in Brooklyn, New York are the most important early works of this period... in a set of paintings titled "The Rabbis" in 1985... By dethroning rabbis from their highly venerated positions, he announces himself as the arbiter of the overall tone and effect of his paintings, obedient to nothing but his own imagination and intentions.

In 2011 The Hyams Museum mounted "Archie Rand: Three Major Works", a show that included the complete series of "Psalm 68, 1994", "The Chapter Paintings" and selections from "Sixty Paintings From The Bible, 1992". In 2012 The Islip Museum exhibited a selection of "The Potato Prints". Also in 2012 Rand was appointed to the Advisory Board of Lost & Found, published by the Poetics Document Initiative at the CUNY Center for the Humanities of the CUNY Graduate Center, New York.

Rand displayed his work in 15 solo exhibitions between 2008 and 2017, many of them showcasing paintings done after Scripture, or his workings with poets: Including "Had Gadya, 2005", Borowsky Gallery, Philadelphia, PA (2011); "Gods Change, Prayers Are Here To Stay (after Yehuda Amichai), 2000", Katz Gallery, Atlanta, GA (2014); "Psalm 68, 1994", Derfner Museum, Riverdale, NY (2014); "The Chapter Paintings", Tribeca Gallery, NY (2015); "Men Who Turn Back (after Eugenio Montale), 1995", SRO Gallery, Brooklyn, NY (2016); "Sixty Paintings From the Bible" & "The Book of Judith, 2012", Cleveland State University Galleries, Cleveland, OH (2016) & The American Jewish Museum, Pittsburgh, PA (2017); "Archie Rand: Early Works With Poetry: Jack Spicer, 1991 and Samuel Beckett/Paul Eluard, 1993", St. Francis College, Brooklyn, NY (2017).

=== "The 613" ===
In 2015 Blue Rider/Penguin/Random House published The 613, allotting one color plate per page for each of the 614 units in the painting. The Wall Street Journal labeled The 613 as "dynamic ... remarkable ... thrilling" The New York Times selected the book as "Editors' Choice" and praised it in two separate reviews calling it "wonderfully garish" and declaring that "nothing prepared the art world for 'The 613.' According to The Washington Post, The 613 "boasts a murderer's row of testimonials." David Van Biema, writing in The Washington Post, also called Mr. Rand "trailblazing", adding that "museum-quality artists consistently addressing the faith's beating textual heart are a small band, Rand foremost among them" The New York Times further stated that The 613 was "brilliant" and concluded with:

Religion isn't easy ... But it also gives us Archie Rand's 'The 613.' Thank God for that.

Soon after its release The 613 rose to occupy the number one positions in two separate categories on Amazon's best-seller list. Rand was referenced as the "Godfather of the contemporary visual Jewish art movement".

In 2017, Kol Nidre #3, a film by Tatiana McCabe with music by Jeremiah Lockwood and using artwork from The 613 was premiered as the opening film on the first day of The New York Jewish Film Festival at Lincoln Center, NY.

Opening in July 2017, The 613 was installed in its entirety, as a single painting, at The San Francisco Contemporary Jewish Museum. The Times of Israel called The 613 "breathtakingly ambitious." Radio personality Raul Gallyot named Rand "the essential creative and outspoken proponent of Jewish themed American art" while the Museum's Director, Lori Starr, commented about the exhibition, "We are honored to present the museum debut of this significant work by one of the most important and original mavericks of the art world."

The 613 was again displayed from September to October 2018 in an installation at The Duke Gallery of Fine Art at James Madison University in Harrisonburg, Virginia. Gallery Director and Curator John Ros, speaking of the exhibition to The Winchester Star, said, "It's an amazing undertaking... I hope that people begin to understand the scope of this. We talk about religious faith, but I think [it's] also about artistic faith... and that sort of relentlessness."

Rand's series "Misfits" (2005) was painted while he was constructing The 613. The images, representing 36 persons identified by folklore as being righteous, were exhibited in 2019 at TOTAH gallery in New York. Reviewing the exhibition in The Brooklyn Rail, Ann McCoy wrote:

His exhibition Misfits, at David Totah Gallery, has the feel of a door that has finally been dynamited open after years of neglect.... Rand, with his down-and-dirty Misfits, brings his agents of salvation into our daily lives and an art world that could use their help.

For the 2021 iteration of "The 613" at the Museum of the Memorial Art Gallery in Rochester, NY, Director Jonathan Binstock wrote:

For over five decades Archie Rand has been regarded as a maverick and rule-breaker, and The 613 is his most ambitious work.... It exemplifies Rand's groundbreaking achievements in the construction of contemporary Jewish iconography, affirming his position as a relentlessly innovative artist.... The 613 also challenges commonly held beliefs about expression and representation.... The complexity of the project encourages an investigation of both systems of knowledge, that of art history and of Judaism, and demands an engaged viewing. The 613 is fundamentally a study of the mechanics of tradition and how meaning is made.

=== Recent activity ===
The 2016 exhibition "Sixty Paintings From The Bible" at The Galleries at Cleveland State University produced a scholarly book about those paintings, written by Samantha Baskind and published by CSU. Also in 2016 Rand showed two bodies of work that were done in Italy, "La Certosa Di Pontignano, 1995" and "Mount Etna, 2005," at The Interchurch Center Galleries, New York. From 2016 to 2017 he served as the Curator and Juror for the Governor of Wyoming's Capitol Arts Exhibition at The Wyoming State Museum, Cheyenne, WY.

In 2017 Rand delivered a mural to Congregation Beth Hatikvah in Summit, New Jersey. It features what is probably the only permanent architectural installation of the Gay Pride rainbow emblem in any religious institution.

In September and October 2017 Rand and collaborator, the poet Bob Holman, displayed their entire fifty unit work "Invisible City" at Freight & Volume Gallery in New York City. Another 2017 exhibition, "Archie Rand: Early Works With Poetry", featuring two series of work from 1991 and 1993 after poems by Jack Spicer and Samuel Beckett/Paul Eluard, respectively, drew the following response from critic Raphael Rubinstein: "No artist of his generation (nor possibly of any other) has devoted as much time and energy and genius and love to collaborations with writers as Archie Rand." Barry Schwabsky's 2020 Artforum review of Rand's exhibition of collaborative works with poets concluded that Rand's pairing of text and image "inspires imagery worthy of the world's most profound children's book."

In 2021 the thematically grouped "Sweet Sixteen" paintings were exhibited at Totah Gallery, which was followed by Rand's showing of the 157 collaborative works created with poet Anne Waldman for their serial work "Blood Moon", exhibited at Freight & Volume Gallery in 2022.

In a 2022 article entitled, "Archie Rand, The Jewish Michelangelo?", journalist Menachem Wecker posits: "I believe his [Rand's] serial paintings represent one of Jewish art history's most unique and ambitious bodies of work, and that synagogue [Rand's murals at Congregation B'nai Yosef] is the nearest thing I know to a Jewish Sistine Chapel." In 2024 The Forward took note of Rand's having completed 915 canvases where the units of the series represented every successive sentence from the Book Of Proverbs.

In 2024 Rand's series of paintings, "The Seventeen: Iron Flock", was selected to be the United States representative at the Jerusalem Biennale.

He continues to publish collaborative books with poets and other texts. The most recent releases are: “Blood Moon” with Anne Waldman, “Single Occupancy” with Lewis Warsh, “The Seventeen: Iron Flock” with Samantha Baskind, “Popeye, Unchained” with M.G. Stephens in which his illustrations were described as “brilliant” and “gorgeous”, and the 2026 release of “Kartooms” with M.G. Stephens.

A number of laudatory reviews followed a series of exhibitions and documenting books beginning with the “OZ” paintings in 2025 at Below Grand Gallery, NY, followed by “Sons” at Contemporary Fine Arts, Berlin, in 2025 which received full front-page coverage in The Berliner Morgenpost and garnered numerous reviews:

“Archie Rand has long occupied a singular place in American painting – an audacious voice at the crossroads of text, religion and pop culture. Over five decades, he has forged a visual language that defies hierarchy: a raucous dialogue between word and image, between sacred history and mass culture. His canvases – flooded with incandescent color, comic grotesquerie and narrative fervor – don’t illustrate as much as argue, sing and shout.”

“His aim is to create paintings that are accessible…fragments of entirely different visual worlds colliding like stray thoughts.”

Andrew Paul Woolbright wrote, “Rand is more interested in retelling such stories through new forms of invented myth bringing the inaccessible veneration of tradition into a more approachable and exciting semblance.”

His 2025 show, “Heads” at Jarvis Art, received notice from many media outlets: Jerry Saltz wrote in New York Magazine, “Rand continues to reinvent figuration through intuition and invention.”

ARTFORUM called it a “Must See” show:

“Want To See - Rand's paintings confront fundamental questions of reality and existence through a raucous, uninhibited visual language that’s rooted in memory and lived experience… Working in series, his deeply autobiographical canvases transform intimate memory into elaborate, corporeal worlds.”

“they countenance both the worldly and the wondrous.”

“He’s ahead of his time and somehow still in it”

The Observer claimed his paintings were: “replicating the miracle of creation and opening entire worlds.”

“Rand’s visual language (is) singular at a moment when so much contemporary painting can feel derivative.”

“This highly idiosyncratic visual language is devoid of inhibition and driven by a recklessly unaccountable imagination.”

“…they embody an original mind that soaks up culture and discourse by the gallon.”

In July 2026, ARTnews reported the sale of 44 of Rand’s “luminous…historical” “Letter Paintings” to Italy’s Modena FC for permanent gallery installation in their new stadium:

“For decades Archie Rand’s “Letter Paintings” series has been something of a cult favorite among painters and critics…(Roberta) Smith argued the paintings deserved far more attention than they had received…She went on to suggest they anticipated later developments ranging from New Image Painting to Jean-Michel Basquiat’s use of musician’s names.”

== Collections ==
Rand's work as a painter, muralist, and graphic artist is held in the collections of The Metropolitan Museum of Art, MOMA, The Whitney Museum of American Art, The Art Institute of Chicago, The Brooklyn Museum, The Baltimore Museum of Art, The Smithsonian Institution, The San Francisco Museum of Modern Art, The Victoria and Albert Museum in London, The Bibliothèque Nationale de France, The Tel Aviv Museum of Art, The Carnegie Museum of Art, The Dallas Museum of Art, and The New York Public Library. His works are included in the university and library collections of Harvard, Yale, Columbia, Brown, and Johns Hopkins, among many others.

== See also ==
- Secular Jewish culture
