= B'nai Yosef Synagogue =

Orthodox synagogue in Brooklyn, New York

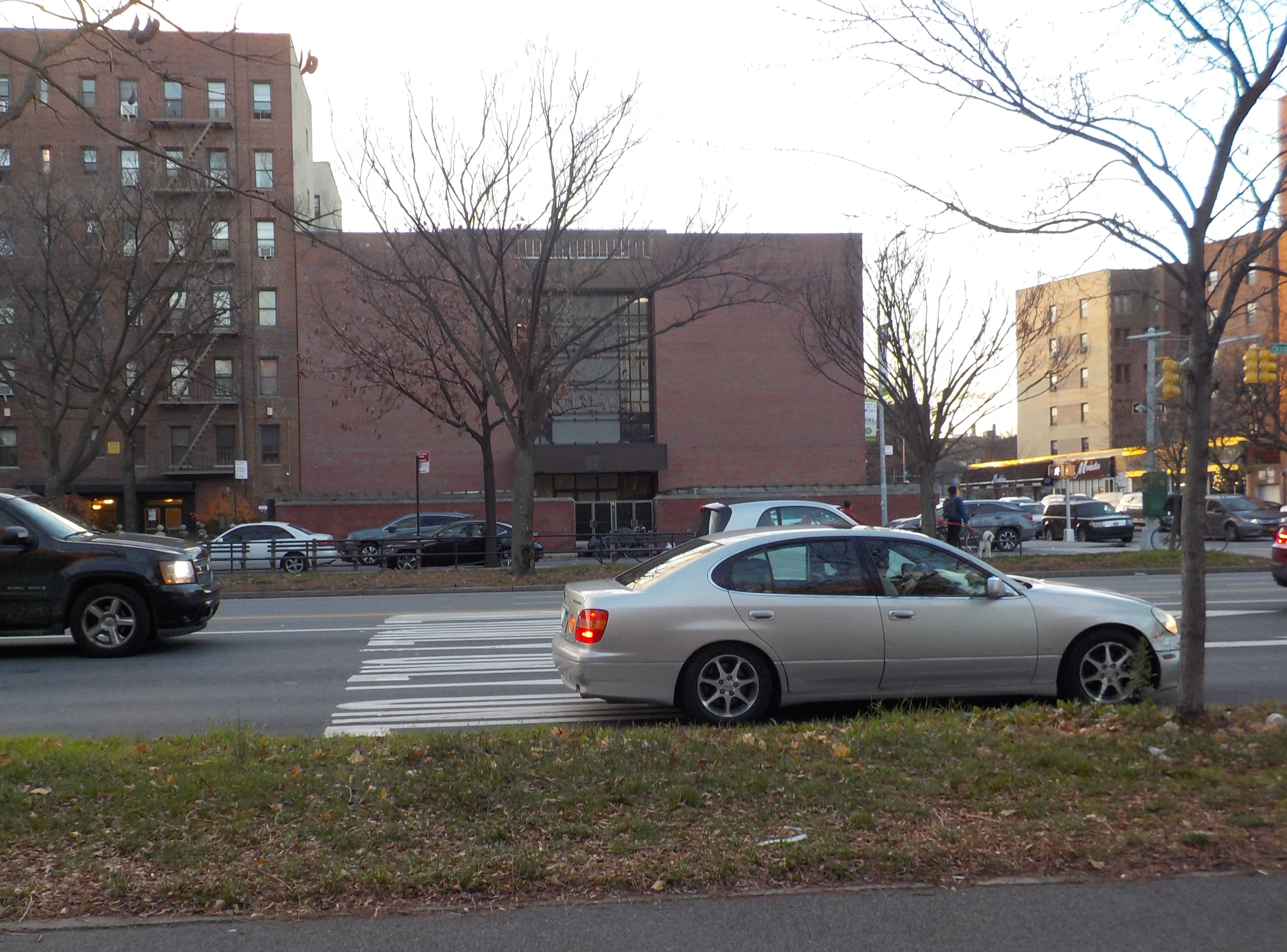
- B'nai Yosef Synagogue, in 2020

- Location in New York City

Religion
- Affiliation: Orthodox Judaism
- Rite: Sephardi
- Ecclesiastical or organizational status: Synagogue
- Leadership: Rabbi Haim Benoliel
- Status: Active
- Religious features: Murals by Archie Rand

Location
- Location: 1616 Ocean Parkway, Brooklyn, New York City, New York
- Country: United States
- Interactive map of B'nai Yosef Synagogue
- Coordinates: 40°36′33″N 73°58′04″W

Architecture
- Completed: c. 1973

Specifications
- Direction of façade: East
- Interior area: 13,000 square feet (1,200 m^{2})
- Materials: Brick

Website
- bnaiyosef.shulcloud.com

The B'nai Yosef Synagogue (or Congregation Bnai Yosef, formerly Magen David Congregation of Ocean Parkway) is an Orthodox Jewish synagogue located at 1616 Ocean Parkway and Avenue P in Brooklyn, New York City, New York, United States. The congregation practices in the Sephardi rite. The synagogue is considered "America's busiest synagogue for Middle and near-Eastern Jews", with over 30 prayer services daily.

Built in c. 1973, it became known as The Painted Shul, because its 13,000-square-foot (1,200 m^{2}) interior is covered in brightly painted murals, making it the only completely muraled synagogue in the world. The synagogue is also unusual in that it was built and is funded by an anonymous individual; thus members are not required to pay any dues.

== The congregation ==
The B'nai Yosef congregation is made up of Sephardi Jews, mostly from Syria, North Africa and Iran, and the nusach (style of prayer service) is Orthodox Sephardi. The congregation is strict in its observance, with most males having had a yeshiva education.

The rabbi is Haim Benoliel.

== Synagogue building ==
The synagogue was built in c. 1973 by an anonymous individual. The three-story, brick-facaded building is unremarkable from the outside. The synagogue walls have tall, smoked glass windows that allow light into the sanctuary, where an elaborate chandelier hangs over the bimah.

=== Murals ===
The synagogue is known as "The Painted Shul", because its 13,000-square-foot (1,200 m^{2}) interior is covered in brightly painted murals, making it the only completely muraled synagogue in the world. Every inch of wall space, including the prayer hall, is covered with murals painted by Archie Rand, professor of art at Brooklyn College, fellow of the Guggenheim Foundation, and a Laureate of the National Foundation for Jewish Culture. Rand's involvement in painting the synagogue began when, unable to pay the tuition fees at his daughter's school, he painted three murals for the school in exchange for a year's tuition. The school loved the murals and Rand was approached to paint the interior of the new B'nai Yosef synagogue.

Rand had only a basic Hebrew school education, and had to engage in intensive study one-on-one with yeshiva students, including at the Lakewood yeshiva in Lakewood, New Jersey, in order to learn about the symbolism that would be most meaningful to the congregation.

Completed between 1974 and 1977, the work was controversial at first, with a group of community rabbis accusing Rand of idolatry. Rabbi Lopian, a local supporter of the murals, took the dispute to Rabbi Moshe Feinstein, who was regarded at the time as the de facto supreme rabbinic authority in North America for Orthodox Jewry. Feinstein declared that "the work is kosher and the spirit under which the work was done is commendable," and so Rand was able to complete his project. The murals have since become much loved within the community, and the former Sephardic chief rabbi of Israel, Rav Ovadia Yosef, has been a frequent visitor.

The murals include an illustration of the bronze menorah by Benno Elkan that stands outside the Knesset in Jerusalem, and representations of the first days of creation, with the first ten things created before the first Sabbath represented by images that include a donkey's head, Noah's rainbow, and Miriam's well. At the back of the prayer hall, there is a blue-circle mandala containing the meditation: "My Lord, open my lips, that my mouth may declare Your Praise."

The women's section upstairs contains images of Jewish holidays, such as Rosh Hashanah and Passover, and a depiction of Rachel's Tomb.

The murals, started in 1974, took three years to complete.

A documentary entitled "The Painted Shul", was made about the murals and Archie Rand's experience by filmmaker Amala Lane and produced by Marji Greenhut in 2003, with minor changes made more recently in 2006. Featuring extensive footage of the stunning and widely varied painting styles, viewers get a glimpse of one of the world's few 'painted shuls'. The tradition of religious painting in synagogues is centuries old, but such murals can only be found in ruins or modest replicas. B'nai Yosef is an actively used synagogue and the murals which were painted in the early 1970s look vibrant and new today.

== See also ==
- Sephardic Judaism
- Syrian Jewish communities of the United States
