= Yatin =

Yatin is a given name. Notable people with the name include:

- Yatin Karyekar (born 1946), Indian film actor
- Yatin Patel (fl. 2011–2013), American photographer and artist

== See also ==
- Yatina, town and locality in the Australian state of South Australia
