= Syrian Jewish communities of the United States =

Syrian Jews in the United States
Total population
- approximately 90,000

Regions with significant populations
- New York, New Jersey, Florida, California, Pennsylvania

Languages
- American English, Syrian Arabic, Modern Hebrew, Egyptian Arabic

Related ethnic groups
- Other Syrians · American Jews · Sephardic Jews

The Syrian Jewish communities of the United States are a collection of communities of Syrian Jews, mostly founded at the beginning of the 20th century. The largest are in Brooklyn, Deal, New Jersey, Manhattan, and Miami. In 2007, the population of the New York and New Jersey communities was estimated at 90,000.

== New York ==
The first Syrian Jews to arrive in the United States were Jacob Dwek and Ezra Sitt, both of Aleppo. They sailed from Liverpool, England on July 22, 1892, on the Germania. After the start of the 20th century, more immigrants came to the U.S. for three reasons: First, an economic decline in Syria crippled their ability to earn a living. Second, the Young Turks, a rebel group responsible for the overthrow of the Ottoman sultan, were conscripting Jews into the Army. Third, the rise of Zionism led to increased anti-Semitism in the Middle Eastern region. Most settled on the Lower East Side of Manhattan. Later settlements were in Bensonhurst, Midwood, Flatbush, and along Ocean Parkway in Gravesend, Brooklyn. The latter is considered to be the current center of the community, though the community was formerly centered around the Magen David Synagogue on 67th street in the Bensonhurst neighborhood as listed below:

- Congregation Shaare Zion, at 2030 Ocean Parkway between Avenue T and Avenue U, housing several synagogues in a single building along with a separate house as an additional annex structure. It is the largest, and is now considered the flagship synagogue of the community. The synagogue was constructed in 1960 in the Gravesend neighborhood, and the community soon followed it there throughout the rest of the 1960s and early 1970s. Until his passing on December 1, 2018, the synagogue held the seat of Chief Rabbi Saul J. Kassin II. The Rabbi's father Rabbi Jacob S. Kassin I, along with the Rabbi's brother-in-law Rabbi Baruch Ben Haim; were the previous spiritual leaders of the Syrian community in New York respectively, until their passings in 1994 and 2005. In his will, Chief Rabbi Saul J. Kassin II passed down his seat as the Chief Rabbi to his firstborn grandson, Rabbi Saul J. Kassin III (his own firstborn son, Jacob S. Kassin II, is not a rabbi). The current Chief Rabbi Saul J. Kassin III is the head rabbi of Congregation Magen David of West Deal and rosh yeshivah of Hillel Yeshiva. Another important rabbinic figure for a number of years was Rabbi Abraham Hecht. But due to conflicting political interests during the 1990s, the Rabbi was forced into submitting his resignation. Sharing in rabbinical duties are Rabbi Yaakov Ben Haim (son of Rabbi Baruch Ben Haim), Rabbi David Maslaton, Rabbi Meyer Yedid (son of the last Chief Rabbi of Aleppo, Rabbi Yomtob Yedid), Rabbi Raymond Haber, and Rabbi Raymond Beyda. The synagogue generally serves the Aleppo or (Halabi) Syrian community.
- Congregation Magen David Synagogue, at 2017 67th Street between 20th and 21st Avenues. This synagogue was the former flagship of the community, and was erected in 1921. The synagogue was at its height of popularity during the 1940s, 1950s, and early 1960s. The synagogue is still in continual use for daily and Shabbat prayers. It is also very notable with the community at present for holding funeral services. In 2001, the building was declared a landmark by the New York City Landmarks Preservation Commission. By 2004, the building was certified and listed with the National Register of Historic Places.

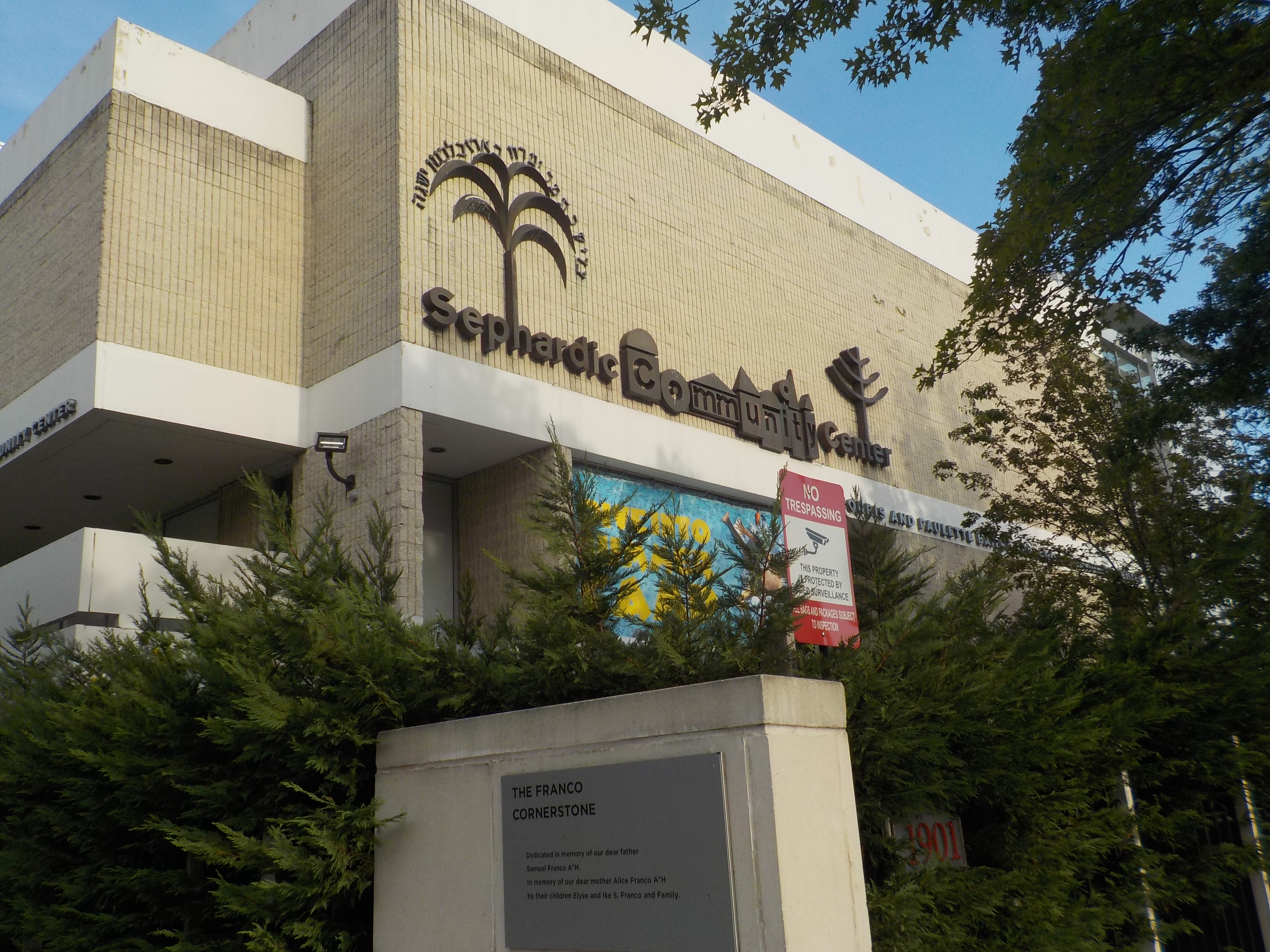
Partial view of the Sephardic Community Center in Brooklyn, 2020

In addition to Syrian Jews proper, the community includes smaller groups of Israeli, Lebanese, Egyptian, Turkish, Moroccan and other similar origins, who have their own place within the overall "Syrian" communal structure. A distinction is also recognized between Halabis (from Aleppo) and Shamis (from Damascus). Furthermore, there is a perceived difference between the Modern Orthodox "White Hats" and those tending to Haredi Judaism "Black Hats", though this is a matter of degree rather than an absolute division. There are no Conservative or Reform congregations affiliated with the Syrian community.

Within the community, there is also a Sephardic Community Center fulfilling functions similar to the national JCC organization. The community is characterized by multi-generational businesses; often, children are encouraged to stay within the family business. Still, many families, recognizing the challenges to financial success posed by a lack of a university degree, have been encouraging undergraduate and graduate education, especially in the fields of business and finance. Those who pursue higher education are encouraged to remain within the familial structure. A number of magazine publications, such as Image and Community Magazine, also cover social topics in relation to the community as a whole.

=== Synagogues ===
Presently, there is an array of different synagogues that cater to the community's many different backgrounds, customs and liturgical styles. They are as follows:

Name	Image	State	City	Clergy	Culture	Address, website
Ahaba Ve Ahva		New York	Brooklyn	Rabbis Jack Savdie, Ovadia Alouf, and Shaul Chamoula	Egyptian	1744 Ocean Parkway, Ahaba.org
Ahaba Ve Ahva Congregation & Yeshiva		New York	Brooklyn		Egyptian	2001 East 7th Street
Ahi Ezer Congregation		New York	Brooklyn	Rabbi Shaul Maslaton	Syrian – Shami	1885 Ocean Parkway
Ahi Ezer Torah Center		New York	Brooklyn		Syrian – Shami	1950 East 7th Street
Ahi Ezer Yeshiva Synagogue		New York	Brooklyn	Rabbi Hanania Elbaz	Egyptian	2433 Ocean Parkway, Ahiezeryeshiva.org
Aur Torah		New York	Staten Island	Rabbi Aharon Zeev	Syrian	1180 Rockland Avenue, Aurtorah.org
Avenue N Sephardic Congregation		New York	Brooklyn		Syrian	321 Avenue N
Avenue O Synagogue, Ohel Yeshua VeSarah		New York	Brooklyn	Rabbi Moshe Arking	Syrian	808 Avenue O aveo.shulcloud.com
Ateret Torah		New York	Brooklyn	Rabbi Yosef Harari Raful	Sephardic Haredim	901 Quentin Road
Beth Aharon Sephardic Synagogue of Riverdale		New York	The Bronx		Syrian	3700 Henry Hudson Parkway East
Bet Shaul U'Miriam		New York	Brooklyn	Rabbi David Cohen	Syrian	2208 Avenue S
Congregation Beth-El of Flatbush		New York	Brooklyn	Rabbi Ani	Syrian – Shami	2181 East 3rd Street
Congregation Beth Torah		New York	Brooklyn	Rabbi Yehuda A. Azancot	Syrian	1061 Ocean Parkway, Beth-Torah.com
Beth Yosef		New York	Brooklyn	Rabbi Aharon Farhi	Syrian	2108 Ocean Parkway, BethYosef.com
B'nai Yosef Synagogue		New York	Brooklyn	Rabbi Haim Benoliel	Syrian, Sephardic Haredim	1616 Ocean Parkway, BnaiYosef.com
Bnei Binyamin Torah Center		New York	Brooklyn	Rabbi David Seruya	Sephardic Haredim	727 Avenue O
Congregation Bnei Ovadia		New York	Brooklyn		Syrian	1922 East 8th Street
Bnei Shelomo V'Yaffa		New York	Brooklyn	Rabbi Eliezer Zeytouneh	Syrian – Shami	1305 Gravesend Neck Road
Bnei Yehuda Congregation		New York	Brooklyn	Rabbi Yohai Cohen	Syrian – Qamishli	2296 Coney Island Avenue
Congregation Bnei Yitzhak		New York	Brooklyn	Rabbi Joey Mizrahi	Syrian	730 Avenue S, Bneiyitzhakweb.org
Derech Emet Torah Center	Derech Emet Torah Center Shul Front	New York	Brooklyn	Rabbi Yosef Palacci	Syrian – Shami	2013 East 13, Brooklyn NY, 11229 https://www.derechemetshul.com/
The Edmond J Safra Synagogue		New York	Brooklyn	Rabbi Eli Mansour	Syrian	1801 Ocean Parkway, ejss.org
Congregation Beit Edmond		New York	Manhattan	Rabbi Shlomo Farhi	Syrian	11 East 63rd Street, ejsny.org
Emek Hatorah Congregation		New York	Brooklyn		Syrian, Sephardic Haredim	1781 Ocean Parkway, EmekHatorah.com
Congregation Har HaLebanon		New York	Brooklyn	Rabbi David Jemal, Rabbi Clem Harari, Rabbi Yaakov Mizrahi	Lebanese/Shami	820 Avenue S
Hayim Shaal Congregation		New York	Brooklyn	Rabbi Mordechai Maslaton	Syrian	1123 Avenue N
Congregation Mishkan Torah		New York	Brooklyn	Rabbi Eli Cohen	Syrian	718 Avenue S
Kehilat Bnei Yaakov		New York	Brooklyn	Rabbi Yaakov Farhi	Syrian	630 Avenue S
Kehilat Derech Yeshara		New York	Brooklyn	Rabbi Avraham Benhamu	Syrian	1784 E 17th St, Brooklyn, NY 11229,
Congregation Kehilath Jeshurun Sephardic Minyan		New York	Manhattan	Rabbi Meyer Laniado	Syrian	125 East 85th Street,
Keter Sion Torah Center		New York	Brooklyn	Rabbi Max Maslaton	Sephardic Haredim	1914 East 8th Street, Ketersion.com
Keter Torah Congregation		New York	Brooklyn	Rabbi Moshe Harari Raful	Sephardic Haredim	2220 Avenue L
Kol Israel Congregation		New York	Brooklyn	Rabbi Tawil, Rabbi Shweky, Rabbi Zabulani	Syrian	3211 Bedford Avenue, Kolisrael.org
Congregation Kol Yaakov		New York	Brooklyn	Rabbi David Mansour	Lebanese	1703 McDonald Avenue
Kollel Ohel Moshe		New York	Brooklyn		Moroccan	1848 East 7th Street
Madison Torah Center		New York	Brooklyn	Rabbi Danny Tawil	Syrian	2221 Avenue R
Magen Abraham		New York	Brooklyn	Rabbi Duvi Ben Soussan	Syrian – Shami	2066 East 9th Street, mabshul.com
Magen David Synagogue of Manhattan		New York	Manhattan	Rabbi Maimon Maman	Syrian	177 Sullivan Street, MagenDavidNY.org
Magen David of Scarsdale		New York	Scarsdale		Syrian	1225 Weaver Street, MagenDavidScarsdale.org
Magen David Synagogue of Staten Island		New York	Staten Island		Syrian	192 Braisted Avenue
Magen David Synagogue		New York	Brooklyn	Rabbi Joey Haber, Rabbi Ezra Cohen Saban	Syrian	2130 McDonald Avenue, Magendavidsynagogue.org
Manhattan East Synagogue		New York	Manhattan	Syrian	1231 3rd Avenue, Mesny.org	
Manhattan Sephardic Congregation		New York	Manhattan	Rabbi Raphael Benchimol		325 East 75th Street, Sepharad.org
Midrash Moshe ben Maimon Congregation		New York	Brooklyn	Rabbi Yair Alfieh	Syrian – Shami	59 Gravesend Neck Road
Mill Basin Sephardic Congregation		New York	Brooklyn	Rabbi Yirmi Levy	Syrian	2133 East 64th Street, MillBasinsc.com
Mishkan Yerushalaim		New York	Brooklyn	Rabbi Yehoshua Alfieh	Syrian – Shami	520 Avenue X
Mikdash Eliyahu Synagogue		New York	Brooklyn	Rabbi Avi Harari,	Syrian	2145 East 2nd Street, Mikdasheliyahu.org
The Ohel Moshe Synagogue Synagogue		New York	Manhattan		Syrian	130 East 82nd Street, MoiseSafraCenter.org/the-Ohel-Moshe-Synagogue
Netivot Israel Congregation		New York	Brooklyn	Rabbi Gad Bouskila	Moroccan	1617 Ocean Parkway
Ohel David & Shlomo – Torath Israel Sephardic Congregation		New York	Brooklyn	Rabbi Abe Faur	Syrian	710 Shore Boulevard, Ohelds.com
Congregation Ohr Eliyahu		New York	Brooklyn	Rabbi David Khasky	Syrian	702 Avenue O
Congregation Ohel Moshe		New York	Brooklyn	Rabbi Moshe Levy	Syrian	1601 Avenue P
Persian Congregation of Flatbush		New York	Brooklyn	Rabbi Shmuel Soleimani	Persian	1434 Ocean Parkway
Sephardic Congregation of the Five Towns		New York	Cedarhurst	Rabbi Mordechai Ben-Haim	Syrian	539 Oakland Avenue, ShaareEmunah.org
Sephardic Jewish Center of Forest Hills		New York	Queens		Syrian	6767 108th Street
Shaare Congregation KGH		New York	Queens		Bukharian	141-41 72nd Avenue
Sephardic Lebanese Congregation		New York	Brooklyn	Rabbi Eliyahu Elbaz Rabbi Abraham Hayoun	Lebanese/Shami	805 Avenue T, Slcshul.com
Sephardic Institute Synagogue		New York	Brooklyn	Rabbi Moshe Shamah, Rabbi Ronald Barry	Syrian	511 Avenue R, Judaic.org
Sephardic Torah Center of Marine Park		New York	Brooklyn		Syrian	3602 Quentin Road
Congregation Shaare Rahamim		New York	Brooklyn	Rabbi Shlomo Churba	Syrian	1244 East 7th Street
Shaare Zion of Great Neck		New York	Great Neck		Syrian	225 Middle Neck Road
Shaare Zion of Hollis Hills		New York	Queens		Bukharian	80-02 209th Street HollisHillsMikveh.com
Congregation Shaare Shalom		New York	Brooklyn		Syrian, Egyptian	2021 Avenue S, Shaareshalom.com
Shevet Achim Congregation		New York	Brooklyn	Rabbi Yosheyahu Shammah, Rabbi Yosef Hamra	Syrian – Shami	708 Avenue T
Shevet Achim Youth Congregation		New York	Brooklyn	Rabbi Yosheyahu Shammah	Syrian – Shami	706 Avenue T
Shuva Israel		New York	Brooklyn		Persian	2015 Avenue R
Tiferet Shaul Congregation		New York	Brooklyn	Rabbi Michael Haber, Rabbi Moshe Haber	Syrian	1747 East 2nd Street, tiferetshaul.com
West Side Sephardic Synagogue		New York	Manhattan		Syrian	120 West 76th Street, wsssynagogue.com
Yad Yosef Torah Center		New York	Brooklyn	Rabbi David Ozeri, Rabbi David Sutton	Syrian	1032 Ocean Parkway, yadyosef.org
Congregation Yam Hatorah		New York	Brooklyn	Rabbi Isaac Mohadeb	Syrian	1573 East 10th Street
YDE Synagogue		New York	Brooklyn	Rabbi Ralph Gindi	Syrian – Shami	2533 Coney Island Avenue, ydeschool.org

== New Jersey ==
The New Jersey community is mainly based in Monmouth County, especially Deal, Elberon, Long Branch, Oakhurst and Bradley Beach. The community largely consists of people who reside there during the summer months, though some live there permanently, especially in the more inland regions of Eatontown, Oakhurst and West Deal. Hillel Yeshiva, located in Ocean Township, is a notable private school that is popular among the youth of year-round residents in the Deal area.

Name	Image	State	City	Clergy	Culture	Address, Website
Bet Rachel		New Jersey	West Long Branch	Rabbi David Tawil	Syrian	48 Larchwood Avenue
Edmond J. Safra Synagogue of Deal	Joseph S. Jemal synagogue (an extension of the Hathaway shul)	New Jersey	Deal	Rabbi Isaac Farhi	Syrian	75 Hathaway Avenue, Safrashulnj.org
Sephardic Center of Fair Lawn		New Jersey	Fair Lawn		Syrian	40-34 Terhune Place
Sephardic Congregation of Fort Lee		New Jersey	Fort Lee		Syrian	313 Tom Hunter Road SephardicFortLee.org
Sephardic Congregation of Paramus		New Jersey	Paramus		Syrian	140 Arnot Place SCOParamus.org
Logan Road Synagogue		New Jersey	Ocean Township	Rabbi Sion Ozeri	Syrian	1200 Roseld Avenue
Magen David of West Deal		New Jersey	West Deal	Rabbi Saul J. Kassin, Rabbi Albert Setton, Rabbi Joseph Dana	Syrian	395 Deal Road, Westdealshul.org
Shaarei Orah		New Jersey	Teaneck		Syrian	1425 Essex Road SephardicTeaneck.org
Magen David Congregation		New Jersey	Bradley Beach		Syrian	101 5th Avenue
Synagogue of Deal		New Jersey	Deal	Rabbi Edmond Nahum Rabbi David Ozeri Rabbi Meyer Yedid	Syrian	128 Norwood Avenue, DealShul.org
Synagogue of Oakhurst		New Jersey	Oakhurst	Rabbi Ike Hanon	Syrian	280 South Lincoln Avenue
Ohel Simha		New Jersey	Long Branch	Rabbi Shemuel Choueka	Syrian	295 Park Avenue, Ohelsimha.com
Ohel Yaacob		New Jersey	Deal	Rabbi Moshe Malka, Rabbi Eli Mansour	Syrian	4 Lawrence Avenue, Ohelyaacob.com
Ahabah Ve Ahva		New Jersey	Deal	Rabbi Michael Haber, Rabbi Joey Haber	Egyptian	108 Norwood Avenue, Hechalshaul.weebly.com
Shaare Ezra		New Jersey	Long Branch	Rabbi David Nahem	Syrian	36 Cedar Avenue, Cedaraveshul.org
Ohel Yis'hak Sephardic Synagogue		New Jersey	Allenhurst	Rabbi Moshe Shamah	Syrian	108 Allen Avenue
Magen Avraham		New Jersey	West Long Branch	Rabbi Reuven Semah	Syrian	479 Monmouth Road, wlbshul.com
Shaare Tefilah Bnei Moshe		New Jersey	Eatontown	Rabbi Moshe Douek, Rabbi Norman Cohen	Syrian	20 Whalepond Road, Eatontownshul.com

== Florida ==
South Florida serves as a winter retreat for many Syrian Jews from Brooklyn and the New York metropolitan area. The majority spend the winter season in the opulent gated community of Turnberry Isle and the surrounding communities, located within the City of Aventura. There they live according to the Jewish and Sephardic traditions of benefiting the community by studying Torah, prayer, and performing acts of kindness.

Name	Image	State	City	Clergy	Culture	Address, Website
Beit Rambam		Florida	Sunny Isles Beach		Syrian	17700 Collins Avenue BeitRambam.org
Bukharian Sephardic Jewish Center		Florida	Miami Beach		Bukharian	4016 Royal Palm Drive
Congregation Magen David of North Miami Beach		Florida	North Miami Beach		Syrian	17100 NE 6th Avenue MagenDavidNMB.com
Edmond J. Safra Synagogue of Turnberry		Florida	Aventura	Rabbi Galimidi	Syrian	19275 Mystic Pointe Drive, Safraflorida.com
Hechal Shalom Sephardic Shul		Florida	Surfside		Syrian	310 95th Street HechalShalom.org
Magen David Congregation		Florida	Surfside	Rabbi Gavriel Koskas	Syrian	9348 Harding Avenue MagenDavid33154.com
Sephardic Center Kollel		Florida	Surfside		Syrian	9524 Abbott Avenue, Sephardic-Center.org
Shaare Tzion Sephardic Synagogue		Florida	Sunny Isles Beach		Syrian	242-256 174th Street
Shaare Ezra Sephardic Congregation		Florida	Miami Beach	Rabbi Sova	Syrian	945 W 41st Street, ShaareEzra.com
Nahar Shalom		Florida	Fort Lauderdale	Rabbi David Botton	Syrian, Egyptian	3489 Griffin Rd, NaharShalom.com
Temple Moses Sephardic Congregation		Florida	Miami Beach		Syrian	1200 Normandy Drive TempleMoses.com

== California ==
Name	Image	State	City	Clergy	Culture	Address, Website
Young Sephardic Community Center (YSCC)		California	Los Angeles	Rabbi Daniel Cavalier	Syrian, Moroccan	9051 W. Pico Boulevard, YSCCLA.com
Congregation Magen David		California	Beverly Hills		Syrian, Aleppo	322 North Foothill Road, MagenDavid.org

== Michigan ==
Name	Image	State	City	Clergy	Culture	Address, Website
Keter Torah Synagogue		Michigan	West Bloomfield Township	Rabbi Sasson	Syrian, Mountain Jewish	5480 Orchard Lake Road, RabbiSasson/Keter

== Pennsylvania ==
Name	Image	State	City	Clergy	Culture	Address, Website
Beit Harambam Congregation		Pennsylvania	Philadelphia	Rabbi Amiram Gabay; Rabbi Moshe Haim Arbiv	Israeli	9981 Verree Road
