= Jon Cone =

Jon Cone (born 1957 in Miami, Florida) is a collaborative printmaker, pioneer and developer of photographic ink jet technologies, educator, and photographer. Cone is best known for the founding of the world's first digital printmaking studio, Cone Editions Press and developer of quad-black ink jet systems for printing fine black-and-white photographs including the first commercially available method of producing fine art black-and-white prints in the digital darkroom.

== Career ==
Jon Cone established Cone Editions in 1980 in a two-story loft building at 112 N. Main Street, Port Chester, NY as a collaborative Printmaking atelier. Within 40 minutes of Manhattan, Cone invited artists to make prints with him using a variety of printmaking techniques including Serigraphy, Woodcut, Etching, Monotyping, and Photogravure. Cone developed and offered unique hybrid techniques in direct response to the painting, drawing or sculpture of a specific artist. Artists worked in concentration with these techniques over periods of time; often several years. Cone began to pioneer computer printmaking in 1984 with David Humphrey and Joel Fisher.

In 1982, he began to focus his attention on artists of the Second Generation of the New York School, publishing original prints and multiples of Stanley Boxer, Norman Bluhm, Lester Johnson, and Wolf Kahn.

In 1984, he began to publish prints and multiples of younger generation painters including Emily Cheng, Lydia Dona, Janet Fish, Willy Heeks, David Kapp, Carole Seborovski, and Archie Rand.

In 1987, Cone opened Cone Editions Gallery at 560 Broadway in New York City's SoHo arts district. The gallery featured the offbeat and unusual experimental projects which ranged from large scale Potato Prints to computer generated etchings and silkscreens to large painterly abstractions. The first show was devoted to Poem Prints by painter Norman Bluhm and poet John Yau, a series of eight large-scale prints drawn from life with a nude-model at the Cone Editions print studio. On March 27, 1988, a photograph of one of Archie Rand's large-scale Potato Prints graced the page 1 of the Sunday Edition of the New York Times Art Section in an article by critic Hilton Kramer In 1987, Cone Editions Gallery showed the first computer generated etchings and silkscreens in an Exhibition entitled The Proof.

In 1989, Cone moved his printmaking and publishing operations to the small rural village of East Topsham, Vermont. Erecting a purpose-built three-story post and beam studio dedicated to the advancements of digital printmaking, Cone Editions began to publish computer assisted printmaking projects in screenprint, monoprint, and aquatint gravure. In 1992, Cone began offering direct digital output with IRIS 3047 printers.

Cone's development began to include software and inks for Iris 3047 printers and from 1994 to 1997 was the Development and Marketing Partner of IRIS Graphics for the fine art market. Cone was responsible for selling Iris printers and providing his own methodology of training to more than 40 Giclée studios in the USA including David Adamson Editions, Muse-X Editions, Hunter Editions, Donald SafTech, Jamie Cook, and many others.

In 1995, Cone began development of his quad-black inkjet printing method for producing fine black-and-white photographs. By replacing the four conventional CMYK color inks of the IRIS 3047 printer with his own formulation of four monochromatic shades of black ink and developing software and lookup tables, Cone produced photographs that were replicants of platinum/palladium printing. Cone found that three shades of black were needed to convey continuous tone, and a fourth monochromatic ink could be used for split toning, a process of allowing a photograph to appear warmer through the shadows. Cone called this invention DigitalPlatinum for IRIS. The most notable project produced with this technique was Diana Michener's Solitaire for Peter MacGill in 1997.

Cone developed his first color ink jet formulation ConeTech WGFA inks in order to realize the brighter gamut needs for photographer Richard Avedon. Cone would print the Avedon portfolio In Memory of Mr. & Mrs. Confort: A Fable in 24 Episodes, as well as Gordon Parks color prints for the Corcoran Gallery of Art Parks retrospective: Half Past Autumn: The Art of Gordon Parks. Cone continued the use of the Iris printer into the next millennium producing Botanica Magnifica in 2007 for the Smithsonian's rare book collection, a double-elephant sized suite of 5 books depicting photographer Jonathan M. Singer's rare botanical photography. In 2009, Cone began collaborating with photographer Zana Briski printing black & white Iris prints of Briski's new insects portraits.

In 1999, Cone introduced a commercial monochromatic black-and-white printing system of inks and ICC profiles for the Epson 3000 printer that allowed photographers to produce a wide range of monochromatic tones from warm to cool using archival color inks and ICC profiles for Somerset Velvet paper. This was the first inexpensive quad-black system to be released by ConeTech. From 2002 until 2008, Cone would develop and introduce higher standards of monochromatic ink jet products for Epson printers including PiezoTone (2002), PiezographyBW ICC (2004), Piezography iQuads (2005), Piezography K7 (2006), Piezography MPS (2008).

In 2006, Cone introduced a new concept in ink formulation by developing an ink set for Epson printers that was "color-managed" during formulation by matching the color gamut produced by the OEM's printer driver, rather than attempting to imitate single ink positions that would later be controlled by ICC profiles. ConeColor inks are compatible with Epson Ultrachrome ink sets, being designed for use with the OEM driver, OEM workflow and OEM ICC profiles.

Cone often traveled to New York City from 2006 to 2008 to collaborate with photographer/filmmaker Gregory Colbert and Mark Sobczak, Colbert's master printer, along with his studio assistants to refine a process that was used primarily to produce original works for Colbert's Ashes and Snow Nomadic Museum. Cone developed a part of the process, which was a system of 11 monochromatic Piezography inks and software developed by Cone in his East Topsham, Vermont studio and transposed to Roland DG AJ-1000 110-inch printers to produce triple split-tone black&white photographs on 2.4m × 5.7m sheets of Japanese handmade paper produced by Awagami for the Ashes and Snow Nomadic Museum exhibitions in Tokyo and in Mexico City which attracted more than 8.5 million visitors, making it the most attended exhibition by a living artist in history.

== Educator ==
Cone has taught traditional and digital printmaking as a visiting professor at SUNY Purchase, NY, University of Arizona, The Royal College of Art, London, Vermont College of Fine Arts and at Goddard College.

In 1993, Cone established the Cone Editions Digital Workshops in East Topsham, Vermont as a hands-on approach to teaching digital printmaking. Attendees were introduced to the concepts of a complete digital workflow in practice rather than in theory. Cone introduced his direct ink jet transfer technique at a workshop he taught, organized by Dorothy Krause called "Beyond The Digital Print" at the Massachusetts College of Art and Design to a group which included the five artists who would later become the "Unique Editions".
