= Synagogue of Deal =

Orthodox synagogue in New Jersey

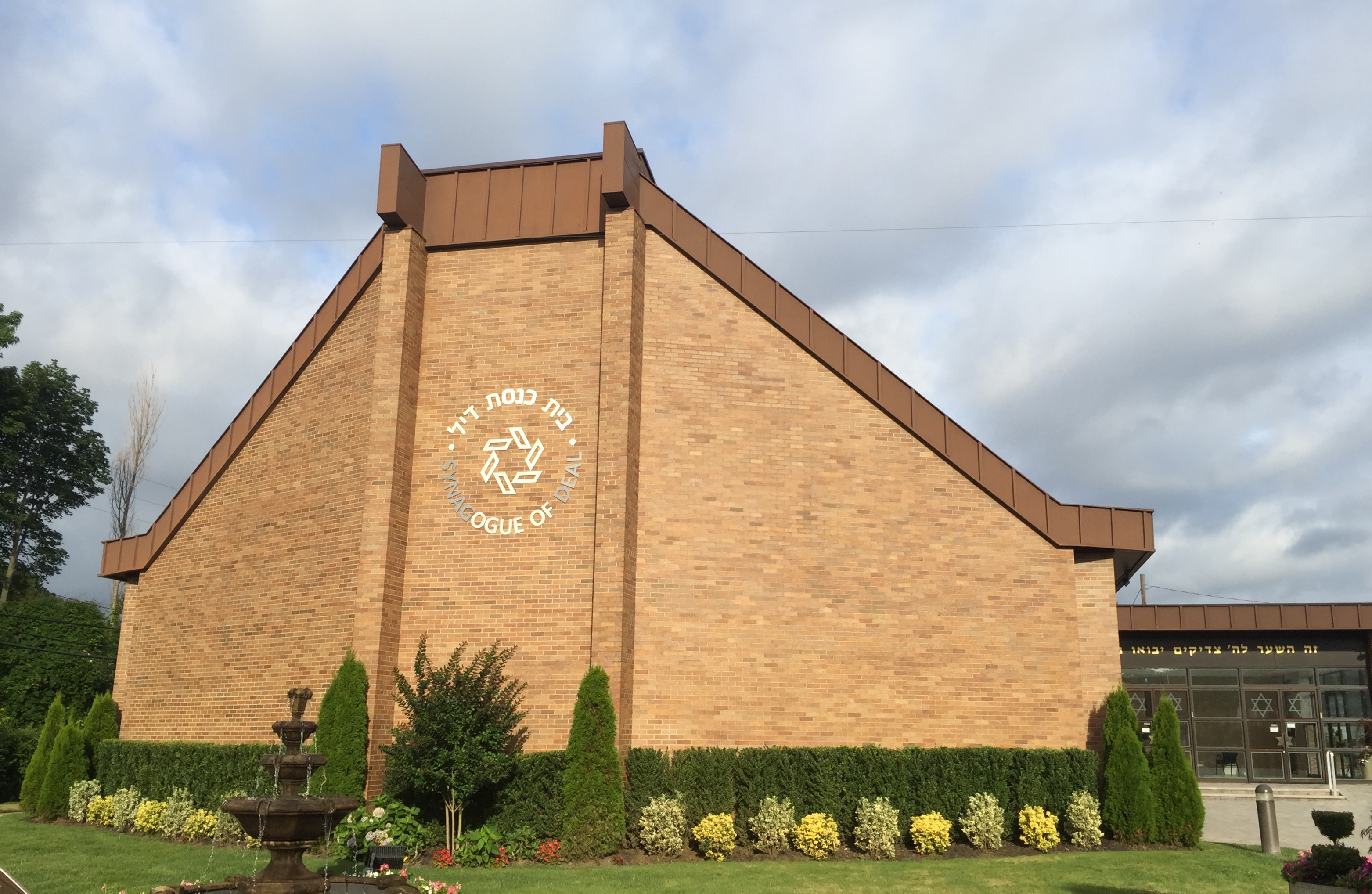
- Synagogue of Deal, in 2020

- Location in New Jersey

Religion
- Affiliation: Orthodox Judaism
- Ecclesiastical or organizational status: Synagogue
- Leadership: Rabbi Isaac Dwek
- Status: Active

Location
- Location: 128 Norwood Avenue, Deal, New Jersey
- Country: United States
- Interactive map of Synagogue of Deal
- Coordinates: 40°15′09″N 74°00′04″W

Architecture
- Architects: Glicksman & Rizzo
- Type: Synagogue architecture
- Style: Modernist
- Founder: Syrian Jewish community of New Jersey
- Established: 1973 (as a congregation)
- Completed: 1973
- Construction cost: $700,000

Specifications
- Capacity: 325 seats
- Interior area: 12,600 sq ft (1,170 m^{2})
- Materials: Brick, timber

Website
- http://dealshul.org/

The Synagogue of Deal is a Sephardi Orthodox Jewish congregation and synagogue, located on Norwood Avenue in Deal, New Jersey, in the United States. Established in 1973 by the local Syrian Jewish community, it was the first synagogue built in Deal.

== Background ==
The Syrian Jewish community of New Jersey, which traces its roots to Syria, Egypt, Iran, and Iraq, initially coalesced as a summer community in Bradley Beach. Members began moving to Deal in the 1960s, and by 1973 the Deal community numbered more than 100 homeowners. Thousands of Syrian Jewish families continued to descend on the borough during the summers, and by 2009 local historians estimated that the year-round population in Deal was 80 percent Syrian Jewish.

== History ==
Syrian Jews, a Sephardi community which maintains strong Orthodox traditions, had been praying together in members' homes in Deal and also in a local social hall for many years. The Synagogue of Deal was dedicated in 1973 after a 15-year effort to establish a house of worship for the growing community. It was the first synagogue to be built in Deal.

At the dedication ceremony in July 1973, three antique Persian Torah scrolls, estimated to be about 200 years and which had been "artistically restored", were gifted to the synagogue, bringing its total of Torah scrolls to five. Upon its opening, 200 families joined the synagogue's membership rolls. By 1979, membership had increased to 450 families. The synagogue also operated three satellite locations in order "to make it as convenient as possible for people to get to the synagogue", according to spiritual leader Rabbi Isaac Dwek.

In the late 1990s, congregants of the Synagogue of Deal helped create an eruv, a halakhic boundary enabling residents to carry items on Shabbat between private and public domains. The 18 mi (29 km)-long boundary, called the Jersey Shore Eruv, encircles Deal and seven nearby municipalities.

== Architecture ==
The 7,000 sq ft (650 m^{2}) building, constructed from brick and timber, was designed by architects Glucksman & Rizzo of Irvington, New Jersey. The synagogue is octagonal-shaped. Its main sanctuary seats 325 people and it also has a small chapel which seats 80. Additional facilities include a library and office. Construction costs were estimated at $700,000.

In 1981, the synagogue received variances from the city to allow it to construct a 12,600 sq ft (1,170 m^{2}) addition to accommodate its growing membership. The cost of the new building was estimated at $400,000. A renovation was completed in 2020.

== Activities ==
The Syrian Jewish community's social life traditionally centers around the Sephardi synagogue. The birth of a child, a bar mitzvah, and a wedding anniversary are all marked by receptions and luncheons held after Shabbat morning services. The synagogue has an active sisterhood and men's club.

In 2019, a kollel opened on the premises under the direction of Rabbi Mechael Semah.

== Incidents ==
In August 2009, Deal police received an anonymous bomb threat against the synagogue and two other Orthodox synagogues in Monmouth County. The building was evacuated and searched but no explosives were found.

== Leadership ==
The congregation's first spiritual leader was Rabbi Morris A. Shmidman, formerly rabbi emeritus of Congregation Sons of Israel of Asbury Park. Shortly after the synagogue building was erected, the congregation hired Rabbi Isaac Dwek as their spiritual leader. Dwek had emigrated from Syria with his family in 1960 when he was 13 years old and received rabbinic ordination at Yeshivas Ner Yisroel of Toronto.

== Gallery ==
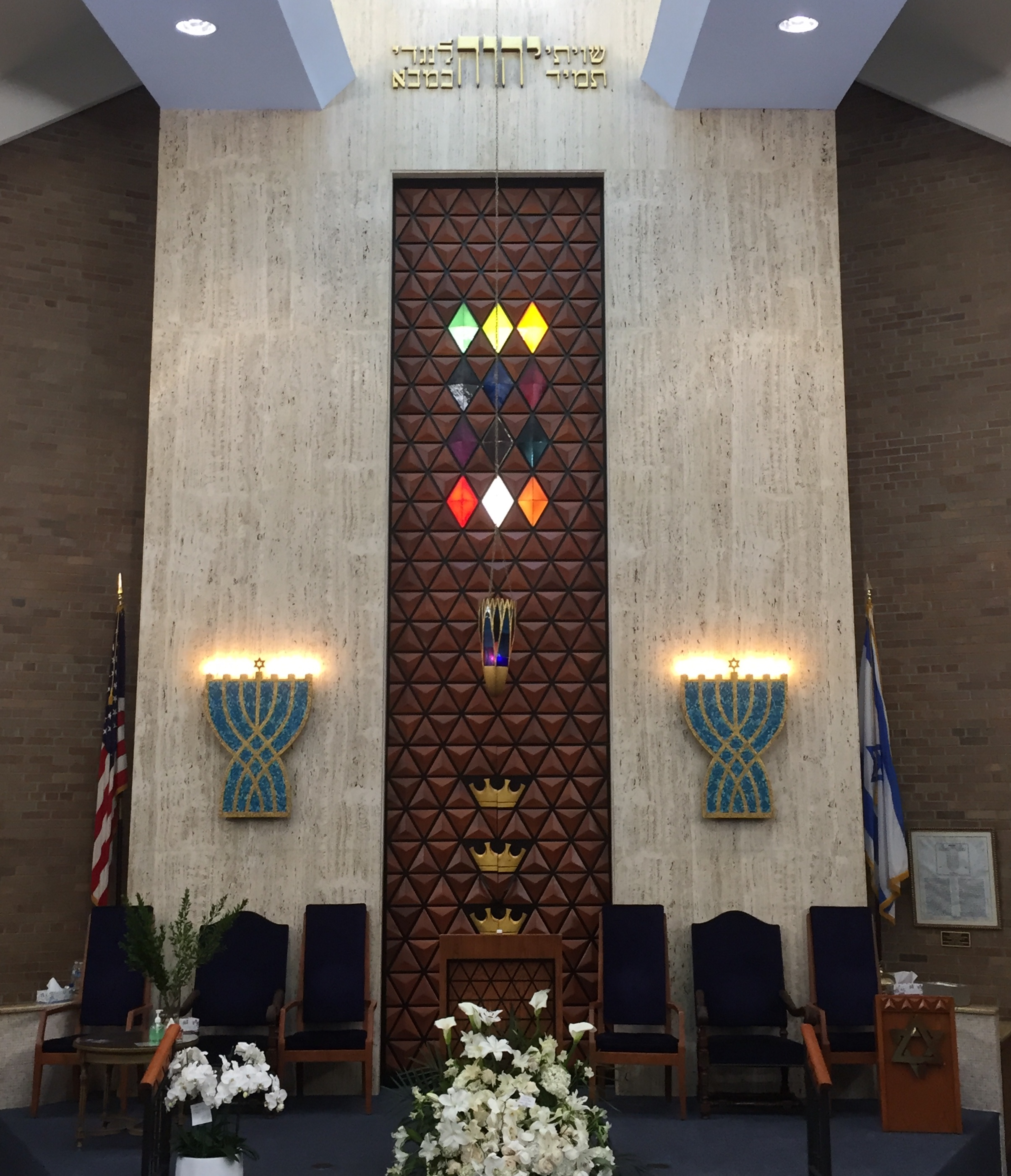
The main sanctuary.

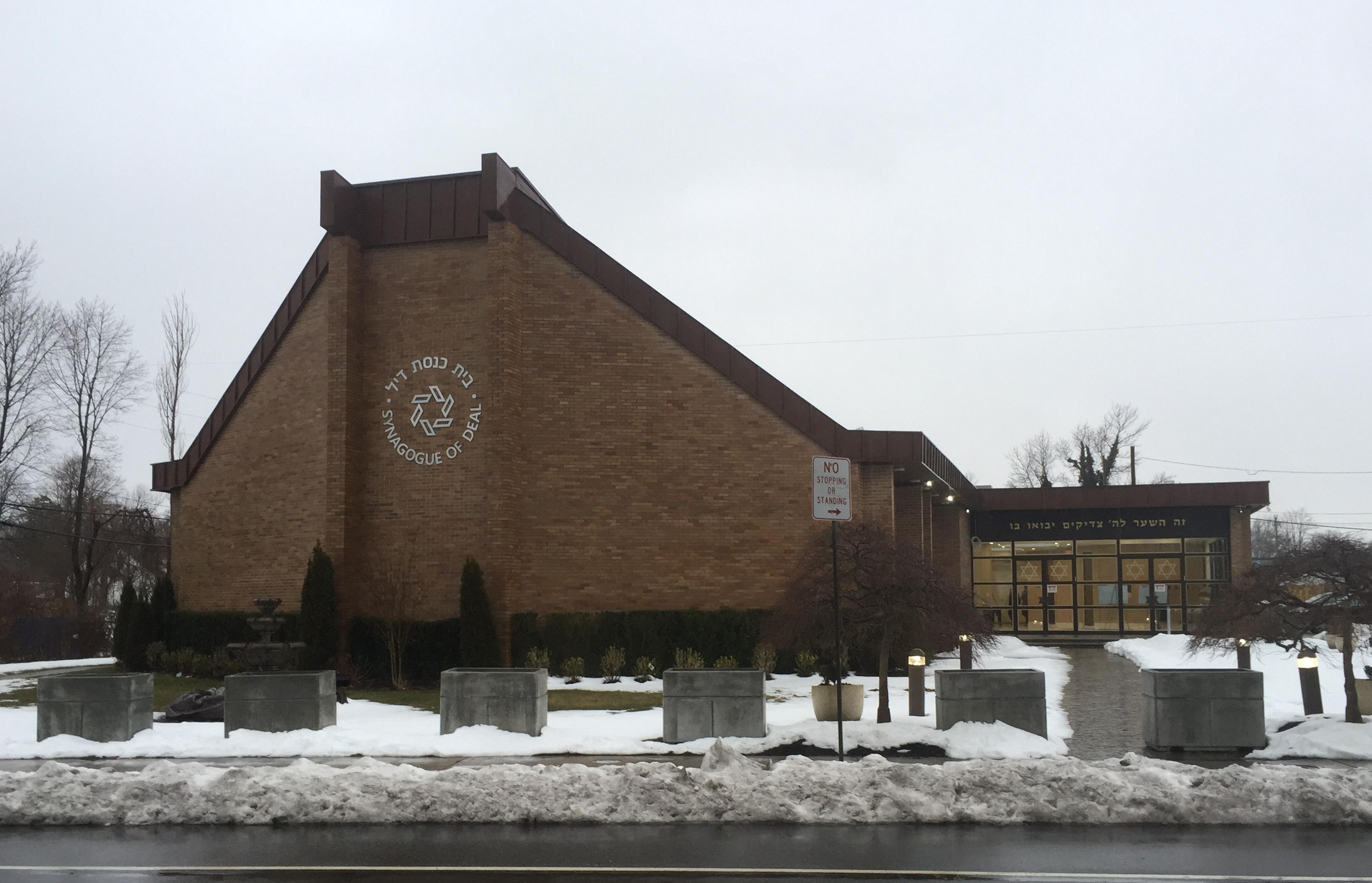
The Synagogue of Deal with the front lawn covered by snow.

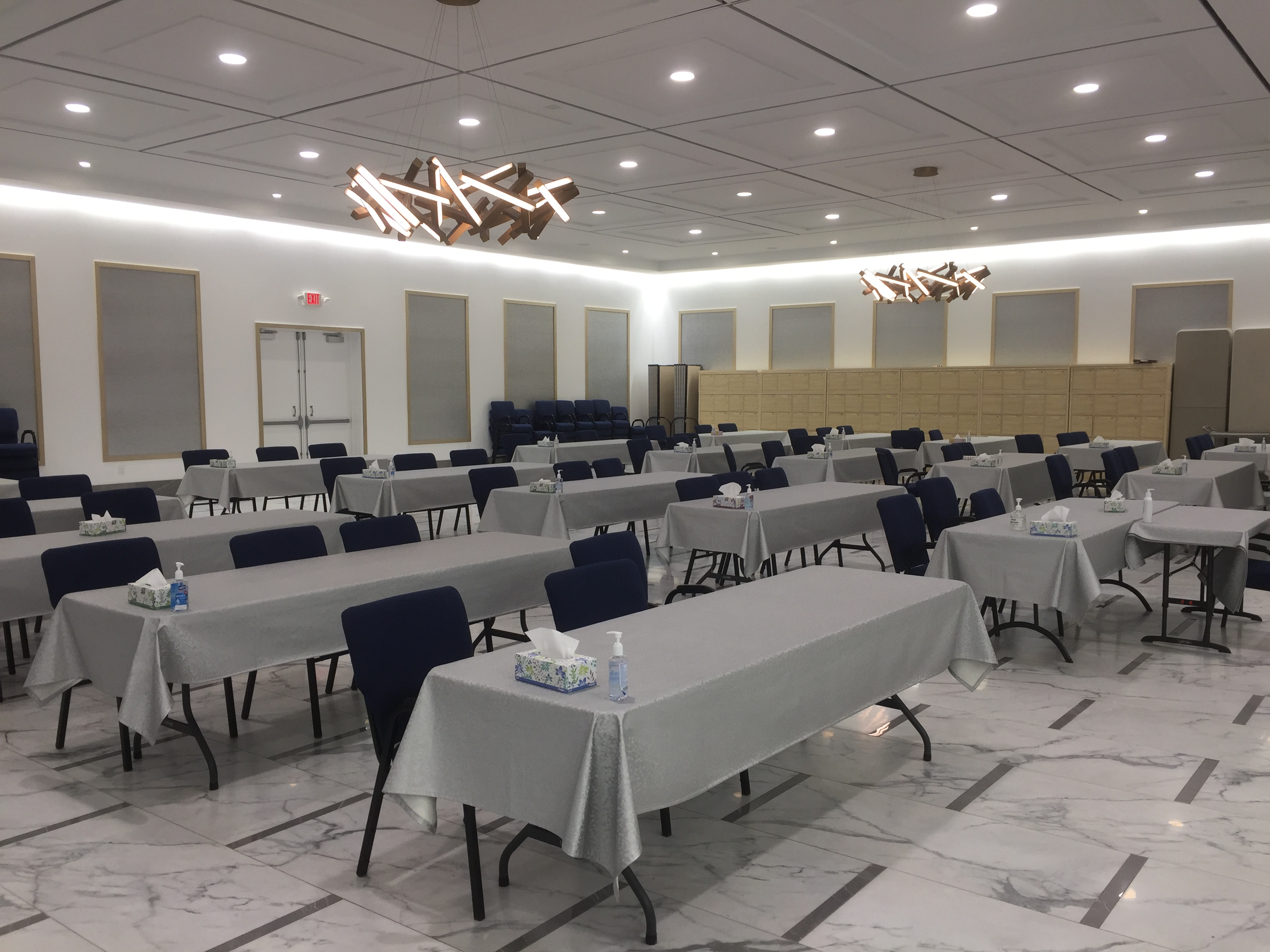
A Study Hall in the back of the building.

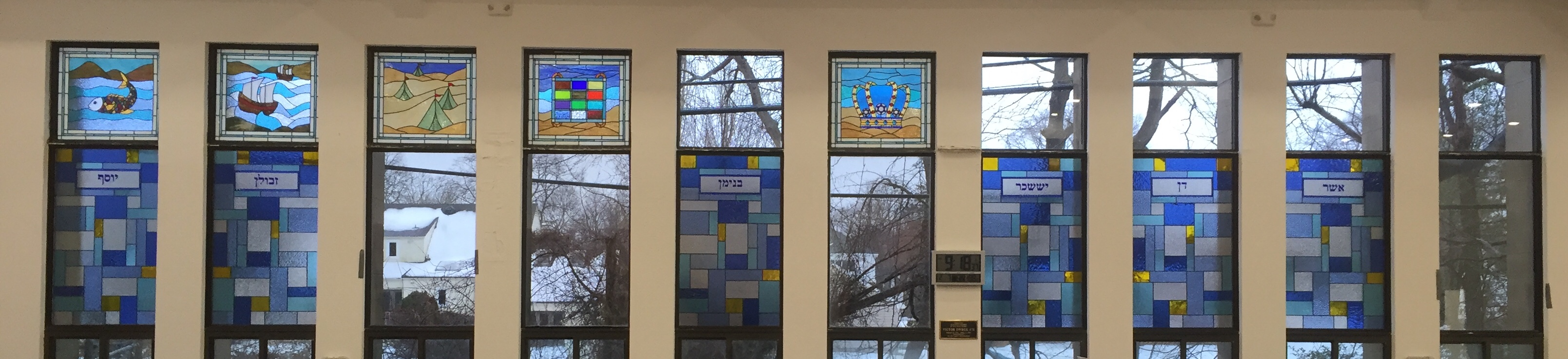
Stained glass window art from one of the sanctuaries.

== See also ==
- History of the Jews in New Jersey
- Syrian Jewish communities of the United States
