= Yatin Patel =

- Born: USA, Florida
- Known for: Photography
- Notable work: Sutra Series
- Website: www.yatinpatel.com

Yatin Patel is an Orlando-based photographer and artist. He originated from India. Patel started a few internet based companies and made a career on art. Patel's belief that having a creative mindset help in the business endeavors.

In 2011 Patel launched a series of photos called "Sutra". Patel's photography focuses on the spectrum of Indian society, culture and history. Through Art & Philanthropy initiative, Yatin supported local and national charitable organisations

== Background ==
Patel mainly shoots his photographs in India. He documents the coalescence of old Indian traditions and modern lifestyles.

== Sutra series ==
A Sanskrit word, "Sutra" translates to a "thread or line that holds things together."

The Sutra project employs high dynamic range imaging, which is a photographic style that evenly distributes exposure in all parts of an image. "Sutra" also focuses on Ahmedabad, which is a partitioned city.

== Printing style ==
Some of the "Sutra" series of prints have been printed on Japanese washi paper, which is a flexible medium for printing. Made from the mulberry plant, washi paper is ideal for printing in that it doesn't use chlorine bleaching and is stronger than regular papers.

The prints are produced by Cone Editions Press (by Jon Cone). These prints are of the highest printing quality.

== Philanthropy ==
The Sutra collection is a platform that was created to inspire society towards charitable giving. Through his art, Yatin has collaborated with several foundations to raise awareness and funds for their respective causes. Yatin has partnered with many philanthropic organisations like the Boy Scouts of America, The Annika Sörenstam Foundation, Kerosene Lamp Foundation, March of Dimes Foundation and Florida Hospital for Children.

== Events ==
Patel's photographic exhibitions have been in co-operation with Orlando charity or benefit organisations.

Patel's Sutra collection was on display at the Mount Dora Center for the Arts from 26 April 2013 through 7 June 2013.

The Orlando Magic's Director of Player Development, Adonal Foyle, held a fundraiser in Sept. 2011 for his Kerosene Lamp Foundation. Patel's photographic work was shown at this event.
