= Magen David Synagogue (Brooklyn) =

Orthodox synagogue in Brooklyn, New York

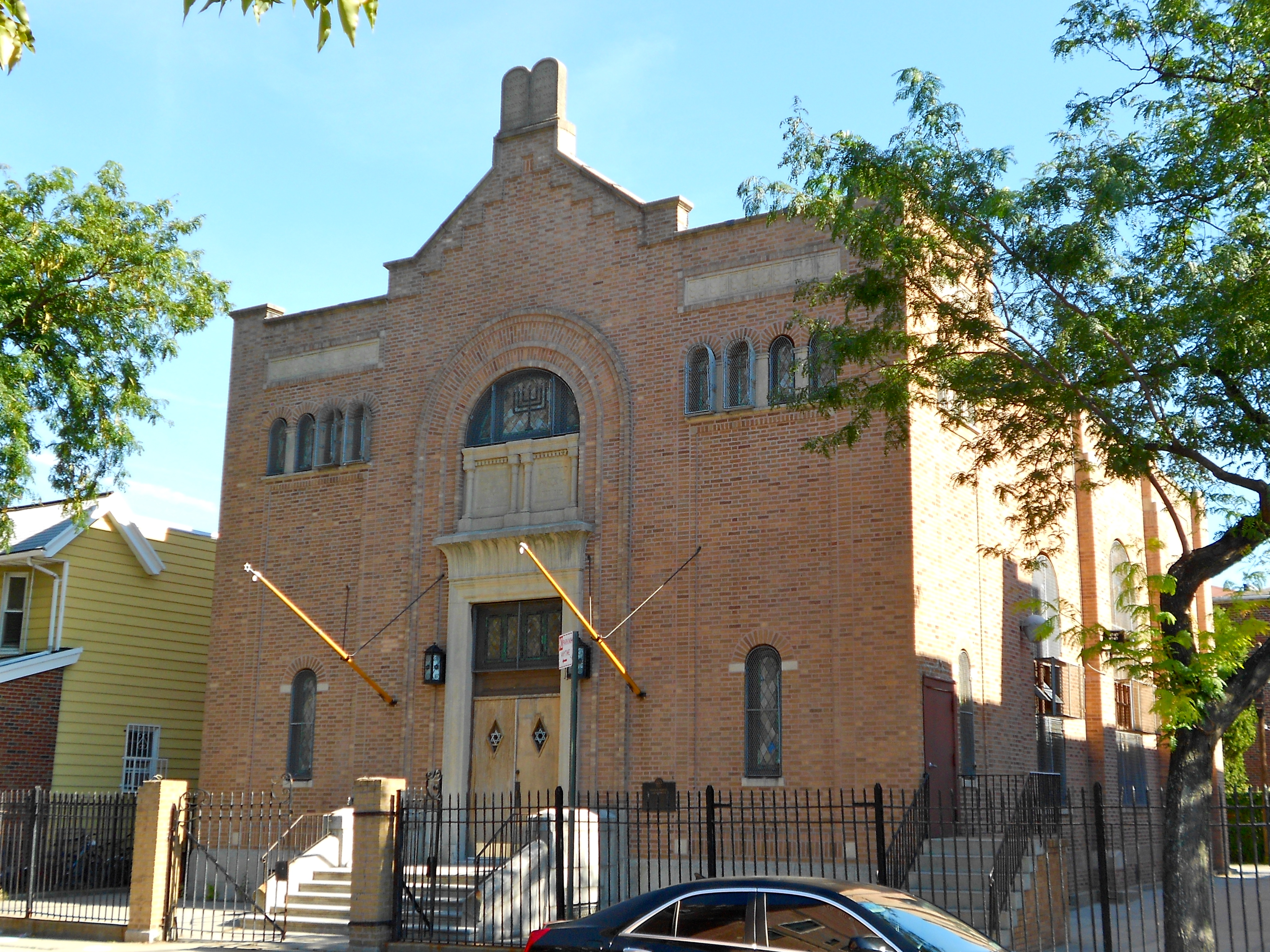
- The synagogue, in 2013

- Location in New York City

Religion
- Affiliation: Orthodox Judaism
- Rite: Sephardi
- Ecclesiastical or organisational status: Synagogue
- Status: Active

Location
- Location: 2017 67th Street, Bensonhurst, Brooklyn, New York City, New York
- Country: United States
- Coordinates: 40°36′54″N 73°59′12″W

Architecture
- Architect: Maurice Courland
- Type: Synagogue architecture
- Style: Romanesque Revival
- Completed: 1921
- Materials: Brick, terracotta tiles
- Magen David Synagogue
- U.S. National Register of Historic Places
- New York State Register of Historic Places
- New York City Landmark
- Area: less than one acre
- NRHP reference No.: 04000293
- NYSRHP No.: 04701.015504
- NYCL No.: 2090

Significant dates
- Added to NRHP: April 15, 2004
- Designated NYSRHP: December 3, 2003
- Designated NYCL: April 24, 2001

Magen David Synagogue is a historic Orthodox Jewish congregation and synagogue, located at 2017 67th Street, in the Bensonhurst neighborhood of Brooklyn, New York City, New York, United States. The congregation comprises mainly Sephardic Syrian-Jews.

== History ==
Erected in 1920–1921, the synagogue was at its height of popularity during the 1940s, 1950s, and early 1960s. The two-story, Romanesque Revival style brick building on a raised basement, features a variety of brick designs and stone details, round arched windows, and a red terra cotta clad tile roof.

In 2001, the building was declared a landmark by the New York City Landmarks Preservation Commission. By 2004, the building was certified and listed with the National Register of Historic Places.

The synagogue is in continual use for daily and Shabbat prayers.

== See also ==
- List of New York City Landmarks
- National Register of Historic Places listings in Kings County, New York
