= Willy Heeks =

William E. F. Heeks, Jr. (born 1951), popularly known as Willy Heeks, is an American abstract expressionist painter.

== Biography ==
Heeks was born in Providence, Rhode Island in 1951. During his childhood, he lived in both Providence and Bristol, Rhode Island.

He participated in the Independent Study Program at the Whitney Museum of American Art in 1973 and earned a BFA from the University of Rhode Island that same year. He studied in the Tyler School of Art's Graduate Program in 1978, and received an honorary Doctorate of Fine Arts from Rhode Island College in 1995.

Heeks lived and painted in New York City for many years before returning to his native Rhode Island in 1996. He currently resides there.

== Awards & Grants ==
- Recipient: Artist Fellowship, National Endowment for the Arts, 1978
- Recipient: Visual Artist Fellowship, Yaddo, Saratoga Springs, New York, 1980
- Special Projects Exhibition, P.S. 1, Long Island City, NY, 1982
- Recipient: Harriet and Esteban Vicente Fellowship in Painting, 1984
- Recipient: Visual Artist Fellowship, Yaddo, Saratoga Springs, 1984
- Recipient: Louis Comfort Tiffany Award, 1985
- Recipient: Artist Fellowship, National Endowment for the Arts, 1987
- Recipient: Artist Fellowship, National Endowment for the Arts, 1989
- Recipient: Painting Award, American Academy & Institute of Arts & Letters, 1989
- Recipient: Honorary Doctor of Fine Arts, Rhode Island College, 1995
- Recipient: Pollock-Krasner Foundation Grant, 1997
- Recipient: Pollock-Krasner Foundation Grant, 2004
- Recipient: Adolph and Esther Gottlieb Foundation Grant, 2004

The following museums and institutions hold Heeks’s work:

- Anderson Collection at Stanford University, Stanford, CA
- BP America, Cleveland, OH
- Brooklyn Museum of Art, Brooklyn, NY
- Butler Institute of American Art, Youngstown, OH
- Chase Manhattan Bank, New York, NY
- Cleveland Museum of Art, Cleveland, OH
- Corcoran Gallery of Art, Washington, DC
- DeCordova Museum and Sculpture Park, Lincoln, Massachusetts
- Dow Jones, Inc., New York, NY
- Goldberg, Kohn, Bell, Black, Rosenbloom & Moritz, Chicago, IL
- Henry Kaufman & Co., New York, NY
- Industrial National Bank, Providence, RI
- Inter-Metro Industries Corporation, Wilkes-Barre, PA
- Jefferson Bank, Philadelphia, PA
- Little Caesar's, Inc., Detroit, MI
- Museum of Contemporary Art, Detroit, MI
- Museum of Contemporary Art, La Jolla, CA
- Museum of Fine Arts, Boston, MA
- Museum of Modern Art, New York, NY
- Museum of Art, Rhode Island School of Design, Providence, RI
- Museum of Modern Art, San Francisco, CA
- Naples Museum of Art, Naples, FL
- NYNEX, White Plains, NY
- Peabody Essex Museum, Salem, Mass
- Piper and Marbury, New York, NY
- Portland Museum of Art, Portland, OR
- Progressive Corporation, Shaker Heights, OH
- Prudential Insurance Company, Newark, NJ
- Quad Graphics, Suffix, WI
- Reader's Digest, Pleasantville, NY
- San Francisco Museum of Modern Art, San Francisco, CA
- Sheldon Memorial Art Gallery, University of Nebraska, Lincoln
- Sherman & Sterling, New York, NY
- Smith College Museum of Art, Northampton, MA
- Southeast Banking Corporation, Miami, FL
- Peter Stuyvesant Foundation, Amsterdam, the Netherlands
- Tampa Museum of Art, Tampa, FL
- Tucson Museum of Art, Tucson, AZ
- University of Arizona, Tucson, AZ
- Williams & Sonoma, Inc., San Francisco, CA
