= Foundation for Jewish Culture =

Former advocacy group

The Foundation for Jewish Culture (formerly the National Foundation for Jewish Culture) was an advocacy group for Jewish cultural life and creativity in the United States.

Founded in 1960, it supported writers, filmmakers, artists, composers, choreographers, and scholars, with grants and awards in the arts and humanities, and by sponsoring programs and national and international conferences. In 2014, it wound down its programs and closed.

The Foundation for Jewish culture invested in creative individuals, in an effort to sustain and grow a dynamic, enduring sense of Jewish identity, community, and culture. To this end, the Foundation provided grants, recognition awards, networking opportunities and professional development services to artists and scholars, made possible through collaboration with cultural institutions, Jewish organizations, consortia, and funders. The Foundation also worked to educate and build audiences for these artists and scholars, in order to provide meaningful Jewish cultural experiences to the American public, as well as advocated for the importance of Jewish culture as a core component of Jewish life.

== Programs ==
=== Film ===
The Lynn and Jules Kroll Fund for Jewish Documentary Film supported the completion of original documentaries that explore the Jewish experience in all its complexity. The fund was created with a lead grant from Steven Spielberg's Righteous Persons Foundation and sustained over 10 years with major support from the Charles H. Revson Foundation. The priority of the fund is to support projects that address significant subjects; offer fresh, challenging perspectives; engage audiences across cultural lines; and expand the understanding of Jewish experiences.

Among its recipients have been Trembling Before G-d, the animated documentary Waltz with Bashir, and the upcoming Sidney Lumet: The Moral Lens.

=== American Academy in Jerusalem ===
Modeled on the successes of the American Academy in Rome and the American Academy in Berlin, the American Academy in Jerusalem was a fellowship for senior-level artists and cultural leaders. The program provides each Fellow with travel to Israel, accommodations for nine weeks, a living stipend, and additional resources to develop individual projects emphasizing social engagement. The Foundation for Jewish Culture established the Academy in order to participate in a larger civic effort to strengthen Jerusalem as an international destination for art and culture. During their stay in Jerusalem, Fellows work with local cultural and/or academic institutions where they teach master classes, serve as mentors, or otherwise participate in the life of these institutions in order to interact with their peers. The Fellows engage with Jerusalem's diverse populations through projects emphasizing social engagement and make public presentations about their current work in Israel when they return to the United States.

== See also ==
- Secular Jewish culture
