= Sephardic law and customs =

Practice of Judaism by the Sephardim

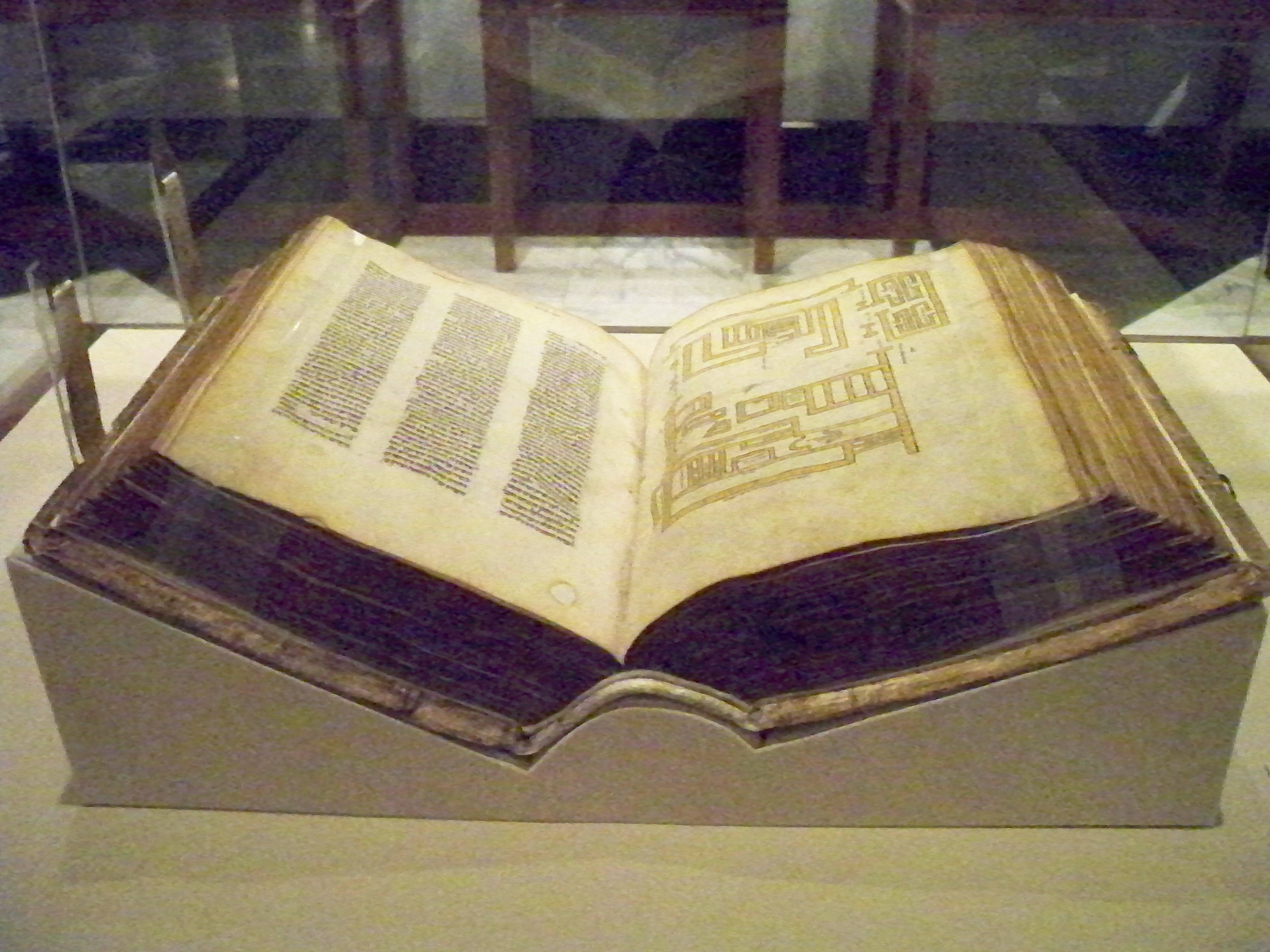
Mishneh Torah, a code of Jewish law by the Spanish-born Sephardic rabbi and philosopher Maimonides

Sephardic law and customs are the law and customs of Judaism which are practiced by Sephardim or Sephardic Jews (lit. "Jews of Spain"); the descendants of the historic Jewish community of the Iberian Peninsula, what is now Spain and Portugal. Many definitions of "Sephardic" also include Mizrahi Jews, most of whom follow the same traditions of worship as those which Sephardic Jews follow. The Sephardi Rite is not a denomination nor a movement like Orthodox Judaism, Reform Judaism, and other Ashkenazi Rite worship traditions. Sephardim are communities with distinct cultural, juridical and philosophical traditions. Sephardim are the descendants of Jews from the Iberian Peninsula. They may be divided into the families that left Spain during the Expulsion of 1492 and those families that remained in Spain as crypto-Jews, fleeing in the following few centuries. In religious parlance as well as in modern Israel, the term is broadly used for all Jews who have Ottoman or other Asian or North African backgrounds, whether or not they have any historical link to Spain, but some prefer to distinguish Sephardim proper from Mizrahi Jews. Sephardi and Mizrahi Jews have similar religious practices. Whether or not they are "Spaniard Jews", they are all "Jews of the Spanish rite". There are three reasons for this convergence, which are explored in more detail below:

- Both groups follow the Halakha, without those customs specific to the Ashkenazi tradition.
- The Spanish rite was an offshoot of the Babylonian-Arabic family of Jewish rites and retained a family resemblance to the other rites of that family.
- Following the expulsion, the Spanish exiles took a leading role in the Jewish communities of Western Asia (the Middle East) and North Africa, who modified their rites to bring them still nearer to the Spanish rite, which by then was regarded as the standard.

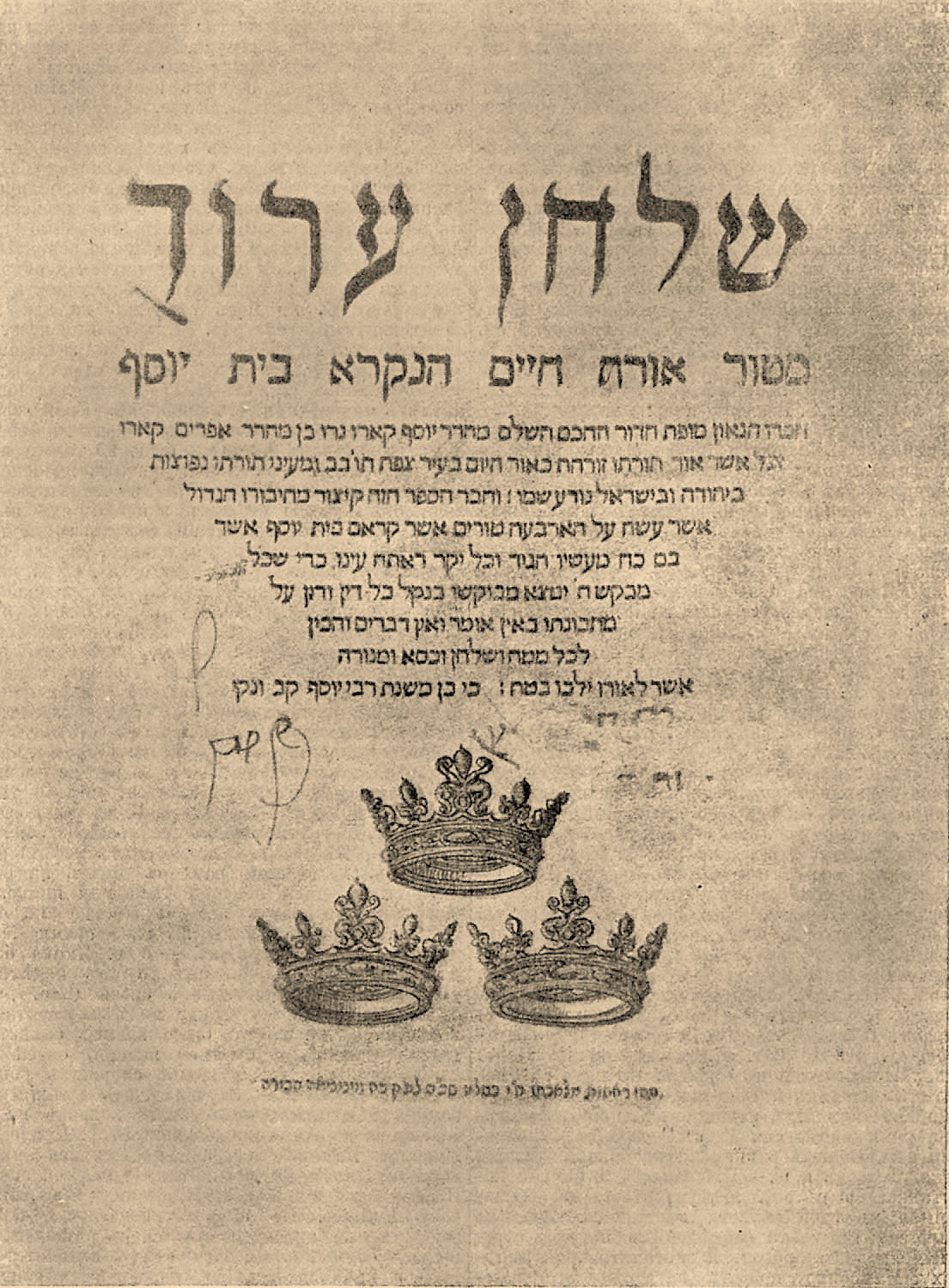
The Shulchan Aruch, a universal code of Jewish law, reflects Sephardic laws and customs.

== Law ==
Jewish law is based on the Torah, as interpreted and supplemented by the Talmud. The Babylonian Talmud in its final form dates from the Sasanian Empire and was the product of the Talmudic academies in Babylonia.

=== The Gaonic period ===
The two principal colleges of Sura and Pumbedita survived well into the Muslim world. Their presidents, known as Geonim, together with the Exilarch or Leader of the Jews of Lower Mesopotamia, were recognised by the Abbasid Caliphate as the supreme authority over the Jews of the Arab world. The Geonim provided written answers to questions on Halakha worldwide published in collections of responsa and enjoyed high authority. The Geonim also produced handbooks such as the Halachot Pesuqot by Yehudai ben Nahman and the Halachot Gedolot by Simeon Kayyara.

=== Spain ===
The learning of the Geonim was transmitted through the scholars of Kairouan, notably Chananel ben Chushiel and Nissim ben Jacob, to Spain, where it was used by Isaac Alfasi in his Sefer ha-Halakhot (code of Jewish law), which took the form of an edited and abridged Talmud. This, in turn, formed the basis for the Mishneh Torah of Maimonides. A feature of these early Tunisian and Spanish schools was a willingness to use the Jerusalem Talmud and the Babylonian. Developments in France and Germany were somewhat different. They respected the rulings of the Geonim but also had strong local customs. The Tosafists did their best to explain the Talmud in a way consistent with these customs. A theory grew that custom trumps law (see minhag): this had some Talmudic support but was not nearly so prominent in Arabic-speaking countries as it was in Europe. Books on Ashkenazi custom were written by authors such as Yaakov Moelin. Further instances of Ashkenazi custom were contributed by the penitential manual of Eleazar of Worms and some additional stringencies on sheḥitah (the slaughter of animals) formulated in Jacob Weil's Sefer Sheḥitot u-Bediqot.

The learning of the Tosafists, but not the literature on Ashkenazi customs as such, was imported into Spain by Asher ben Jehiel, a German-born scholar who became chief rabbi of Toledo and the author of the Hilchot ha-Rosh - an elaborate Talmudic commentary, which became the third of the great Spanish authorities after Alfasi and Maimonides. A more popular résumé, known as the Arba'ah Turim, was written by his son, Jacob ben Asher, though he did not agree with his father on all points. The Tosafot were also used by scholars of the Catalan school, such as Nahmanides and Solomon ben Adret, who were also noted for their interest in Kabbalah. For a while, Spain was divided between the schools: in Catalonia the rulings of Nahmanides and ben Adret were accepted, in Castile those of the Asher family, and in Valencia those of Maimonides. (Maimonides' rulings were also accepted in most of the Arab world, especially Yemen, Egypt and the Land of Israel.)

=== After the expulsion ===
Following the expulsion of the Jews from Spain, Jewish law was codified by Yosef Karo in his Bet Yosef, which took the form of a commentary on the Arba'ah Turim, and Shulḥan Arukh, which presented the same results in the form of a practical abridgement. He consulted most of the authorities available to him but generally arrived at a pragmatic decision by following the majority among the three great Spanish authorities Alfasi, Maimonides, and Asher ben Yeḥiel, unless most of the other authorities were against them. Karo did not consciously intend to exclude non-Sephardi authorities. Still, he considered that the Ashkenazi school, so far as it had anything to contribute to Halakha as opposed to purely Ashkenazi custom, was adequately represented by Asher. However, since Alfasi and Maimonides generally agree, the overall result was overwhelmingly Sephardi in flavour, though in several cases, Karo set the result of this consensus aside and ruled in favour of the Catalan school (Nahmanides and Solomon ben Adret), some of whose opinions had Ashkenazi origins. Today, the Bet Yosef is accepted by Sephardim as the leading authority in Jewish law, subject to minor variants drawn from the rulings of later rabbis accepted in particular communities.

The Polish rabbi Moses Isserles, while acknowledging the merits of the Shulḥan Arukh, felt that it did not do justice to Ashkenazi scholarship and practice. He accordingly composed a series of glosses setting out all respects in which Ashkenazi practice differs, and the composite work is today accepted as the leading work on Ashkenazi halakha. Isserles felt free to differ from Karo on particular points of law. In principle, he accepted Karo's view that the Sephardic practice set out in the Shulḥan Arukh represents standard Jewish law while the Ashkenazi practice is essentially a local custom. So far, then, it is meaningless to speak of "Sephardic custom": all that is meant is Jewish law without the particular customs of the Ashkenazim. For this reason, the law accepted by other non-Ashkenazi communities, such as the Italian and Yemenite Jews, is basically similar to that of the Sephardim. There are of course customs peculiar to particular countries or communities within the Sephardic world, such as Syria and Morocco.

An important body of customs grew up in the Kabbalistic circle of Isaac Luria and his followers in Safed, and many of these have spread to communities throughout the Sephardi world: this is discussed further in the Liturgy section below. In some cases they are accepted by Greek and Turkish Sephardim and Mizrahi Jews but not by Western communities such as the Spanish and Portuguese Jews. These are customs in the true sense: in the list of usages below they are distinguished by an L sign.

== Liturgy ==
=== Origins ===
For the outline and early history of the Jewish liturgy, see the articles on Siddur and Jewish services. At an early stage, a distinction was established between the Babylonian ritual and that used in the land of Israel, as these were the two main centres of religious authority: there is no complete text of the Palestinian rite, though some fragments have been found in the Cairo Genizah.

Most scholars maintain that Sephardic Jews are inheritors of the religious traditions of the great Babylonian Jewish academies, and that Ashkenazi Jews are descendants of those who initially followed the Judaean or Galilaean Jewish religious traditions. Others, such as Moses Gaster, maintain precisely the opposite. To put the matter into perspective, it must be emphasized that all Jewish liturgies in use in the world today are in substance Babylonian, with a small number of Palestinian usages surviving the process of standardization: in a list of differences preserved from the time of the Geonim, most of the usages recorded as Palestinian are now obsolete. (In the list of usages below, Sephardic usages inherited from Palestine are marked P, and instances where the Sephardic usage conforms to the Babylonian while the Ashkenazi usage is Palestinian are marked B.) By the 12th century, as a result of the efforts of Babylonian leaders such as Yehudai ben Nahman and Pirqoi ben Baboi, the communities of Palestine, and Diaspora communities such as Kairouan that had historically followed Palestinian usages, had adopted Babylonian rulings in most respects, and Jews accepted Babylonian authority throughout the Arabic-speaking world.

Early attempts at standardizing the liturgy that have been preserved include, in chronological order, those of Amram Gaon, Saadia Gaon, Shelomoh ben Natan of Sijilmasa (in Morocco) and Maimonides. All of these were based on the legal rulings of the Geonim but show a recognisable evolution towards the current Sephardi text. The liturgy in use in Visigothic Spain is likely to have belonged to a Palestinian-influenced European family, together with the Italian and Provençal, and more remotely the Old French and Ashkenazi rites, but as no liturgical materials from the Visigothic era survive we cannot know for certain. From references in later treatises such as the Sefer ha-Manhig by Rabbi Abraham ben Nathan ha-Yarḥi (c. 1204), it appears that even at that later time the Spanish rite preserved certain European peculiarities that have since been eliminated in order to conform to the rulings of the Geonim and the official texts based on them. (Conversely the surviving versions of those texts, in particular that of Amram Gaon, appear to have been edited to reflect some Spanish and other local usages.) The present Sephardic liturgy should therefore be regarded as the product of gradual convergence between the original local rite and the North African branch of the Babylonian-Arabic family, as prevailing in Geonic times in Egypt and Morocco. Following the Reconquista, the specifically Spanish liturgy was commented on by David Abudirham (c. 1340), who was concerned to ensure conformity with the rulings of halakha, as understood by the authorities up to and including Asher ben Yehiel. Despite this convergence, there were distinctions between the liturgies of different parts of the Iberian peninsula. For example, the Lisbon and Catalan rites were somewhat different from the Castilian rite, which formed the basis of the later Sephardic tradition. The Catalan rite was intermediate between the Castilian rite and that of the Hachmei Provence: Hakham Moses Gaster classified the rites of Oran and Tunis in this group.

=== Post-expulsion ===
After the expulsion from Spain, the Sephardim took their liturgy with them to countries throughout the Arab and Ottoman Empire, where they soon assumed rabbinic and communal leadership positions. They formed communities, often maintaining differences based on their places of origin in the Iberian peninsula. In Saloniki, for instance, there were more than twenty synagogues, each using the rite of a different locality in Spain or Portugal (as well as one Romaniote and one Ashkenazi synagogue).

In a process lasting from the 16th through the 19th century, the native Jewish communities of most Arab and Ottoman countries adapted their pre-existing liturgies, many of which already had a family resemblance with the Sephardic, to follow the Spanish rite in as many respects as possible. Some reasons for this are:

1. The Spanish exiles were regarded as an elite and supplied many of the Chief Rabbis to the countries in which they settled so that the Spanish rite tended to be favoured over any previous native rite;
2. The invention of printing meant that Siddurim were printed in bulk, usually in Italy, so that a congregation wanting books generally had to opt for a standard "Sephardi" or "Ashkenazi" text: this led to the obsolescence of many historic local rites, such as the Provençal rite;
3. Yosef Karo's Shulḥan Arukh presupposes a "Castilian rite" at every point, so that that version of the Spanish rite had the prestige of being "according to the opinion of Maran";
4. The Hakham Bashi of Constantinople was the constitutional head of all the Jews of the Ottoman Empire, further encouraging uniformity. The North Africans in particular were influenced by Greek and Turkish models of Jewish practice and cultural behaviour. For this reason, many of them to this day pray according to a rite known as "minhag Ḥida" (the custom of Chaim Joseph David Azulai).
5. The influence of Isaac Luria's Kabbalah, see the next section.

=== Lurianic Kabbalah ===
The most important theological, as opposed to practical, motive for harmonization was the Kabbalistic teachings of Isaac Luria and Ḥayim Vital. Luria himself always maintained that it was the duty of every Jew to abide by his ancestral tradition, so that his prayers should reach the gate in Heaven appropriate to his tribal identity. (Note: "There are many differences between the [various] prayer books, between the Sefardi rite, the Catalonian rite, the Ashkenazi rite, and the like. Concerning this matter, my master [the Ari] of blessed memory told me that there are twelve windows in heaven corresponding to the twelve tribes, and that the prayer of each tribe ascends through its own special gate. This is the secret of the twelve gates mentioned at the end of [the book of] Yechezkel. There is no question that were the prayers of all the tribes the same, there would be no need for twelve windows and gates, each gate having a path of its own. Rather, without a doubt it necessarily follows that because their prayers are different, each and every tribe requires its own gate. For in accordance with the source and root of the souls of that tribe, so must be its prayer rite. It is therefore fitting that each and every individual should maintain the customary liturgical rite of his forefathers. For you do not know who is from this tribe and who from that tribe. And since his forefathers practiced a certain custom, perhaps he is from that tribe for whom this custom is appropriate, and if he comes now and changes it, his prayer may not ascend [to heaven], when it is not offered in accordance with that rite. (Sha'ar ha-Kavvanot, 'Inyan Nusach ha-Tefillah)" Navon, Chaim (Rav); Strauss, translated by David. "The various rites of Jewish liturgy". The Israel Koschitzky Virtual Beit Midrash. Yeshivat Har Etzion. Archived from the original on 2 August 2014.) However he devised a system of usages for his own followers, which were recorded by Vital in his Sha'ar ha-Kavvanot in the form of comments on the Venice edition of the Spanish and Portuguese prayer book. The theory then grew up that this composite Sephardic rite was of special spiritual potency and reached a "thirteenth gate" in Heaven for those who did not know their tribe: prayer in this form could therefore be offered in complete confidence by everyone.

Further Kabbalistic embellishments were recorded in later rabbinic works such as the 18th century Ḥemdat Yamim (anonymous, but sometimes attributed to Nathan of Gaza). The most elaborate version of these is contained in the Siddur published by the 18th century Yemenite Kabbalist Shalom Sharabi for the use of the Bet El yeshivah in Jerusalem: this contains only a few lines of text on each page, the rest being filled with intricate meditations on the letter combinations in the prayers. Other scholars commented on the liturgy from both a halachic and a kabbalistic perspective, including Ḥayim Azulai and Ḥayim Palaggi.

The influence of the Lurianic-Sephardic rite extended even to countries outside the Ottoman sphere of influence such as Iran (Persia). (The previous Iranian rite was based on the Siddur of Saadia Gaon.) The main exceptions to this tendency were:

- Yemen, where a conservative group called "Baladi" maintained their ancestral tradition based on the works of Maimonides (and therefore do not regard themselves as Sephardi at all), and
- the Spanish and Portuguese Jews of Western countries, who adopted a certain number of Kabbalistic usages piecemeal in the 17th century but later abandoned many of them because it was felt that the Lurianic Kabbalah had contributed to the Shabbetai Tzevi disaster.
- Some Moroccan communities did not accept certain Kabbalistic practices because they said that they had old traditions that they did not need to change.

There were also Kabbalistic groups in the Ashkenazi world, which adopted the Lurianic-Sephardic ritual, on the theory of the thirteenth gate mentioned above. This accounts for the "Nusach Sefard" and "Nusach Ari" in use among the Hasidim, which is based on the Lurianic-Sephardic text with some Ashkenazi variations.

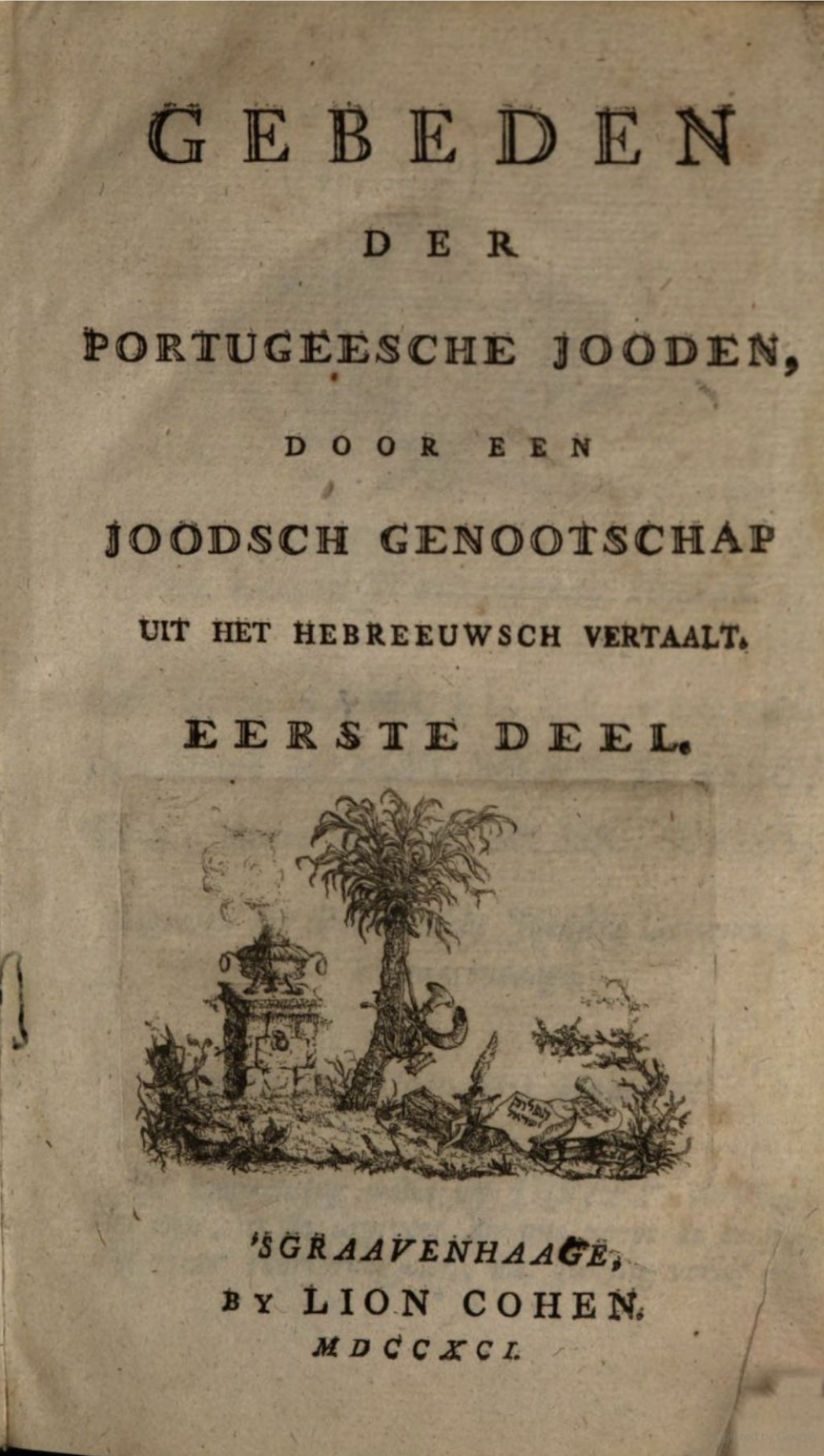
A Sephardic prayerbook in Dutch (1791).

=== 19th century ===
From the 1840s on, a series of prayer books was published in Livorno, including Tefillat ha-Ḥodesh, Bet Obed and Zechor le-Abraham. These included notes on practice and the Kabbalistic additions to the prayers, but not the meditations of Shalom Sharabi, as the books were designed for public congregational use. They quickly became standard in almost all Sephardic and Oriental communities, with any local variations preserved only by oral tradition. In the late 19th and early 20th centuries, many more Sephardic prayer books were published in Vienna. These were primarily aimed at the Judaeo-Spanish communities of the Balkans, Greece and Turkey, and therefore had rubrics in Judeo-Spanish, but also had a wider distribution.

A significant influence on Sephardic prayer and custom was the late 19th century Baghdadi rabbi Yosef Hayyim, whose work of that name contained both halachic rulings and observations on Kabbalistic custom based on his correspondence with Eliyahu Mani of the Beit El synagogue. These rulings and observations form the basis of the Baghdadi rite: both the text of the prayers and the accompanying usages differ in some respects from those of the Livorno editions. The rulings of the Ben Ish Ḥai have been accepted in several other Sephardic and Oriental communities, such as that of the Jews of Djerba.

=== Present day ===
In the Sephardic world today, particularly in Israel, many popular prayer books contain the Baghdadi rite, and this is what is currently known as Minhag Edot ha-Mizraḥ (the custom of the Oriental congregations). Other authorities, especially older rabbis from North Africa, reject these in favour of a more conservative Oriental-Sephardic text as found in the 19th century Livorno editions; and the Shami Yemenite and Syrian rites belong to this group. Others again, following Ovadia Yosef, prefer a form shorn of some of the Kabbalistic additions and nearer to what would have been known to Joseph Karo, and seek to establish this as the standard "Israeli Sephardi" rite for use by all communities. The liturgy of the Spanish and Portuguese Jews differs from all these (more than the Eastern groups differ from each other), as it represents an older form of the text, has far fewer Kabbalistic additions and reflects some Italian influence. The differences between all these groups, however, exist at the level of detailed wording, for example the insertion or omission of a few extra passages: structurally, all Sephardic rites are very similar.

== Instances of Sephardic usage ==
| Code | Description |
|---|---|
| L | Sephardic usage derived from Lurianic Kabbalah (some of these are accepted by Greek and Turkish Sephardim and Mizrahi Jews but not by Western communities such as the Spanish and Portuguese Jews) |
| P | Sephardic usage inherited from Palestine while the Ashkenazi usage is Babylonian |
| B | Sephardic usage conforming to the Babylonian while the Ashkenazi usage is Palestinian |

=== Tefillin ===
- Most Sephardi groups do not put on tefillin during Chol HaMoed, the middle days of festivals. L
- They say only one blessing to cover the tefillin of the arm and the head, rather than one for each. However, they say the second blessing if interrupted and have to say something after placing the arm tefillin.
- Sephardim wind the tefillin strap anti-clockwise (for a right-handed person). The form of the knot and the wrappings round the hand are also different from that of the Ashkenazim.
- The letter shin on the head tefillin has a different calligraphy than on the Ashkenazi tefillin.
- The script used in Torah scrolls, tefillin and mezuzot differs from the Ashkenazi and nearer to the printed square characters. This script is called "Velsh" or "Veilish" (the Yiddish equivalent of German Wälsch) and comes from Italy. The Shulchan Aruch uses the traditional Ashkenazi script instead. A third script, associated with Isaac Luria, is used by Hasidim.

=== Tzitzit ===
- It is not a Sephardi practice to let the tzitziyot of the tzitzit katan hang out.
- In the tzitzit, each winding loops through the preceding one, and the pattern of windings between the knots is either 10-5-6-5 (in some communities, L) or 7-8-11-13 (in others, per Shulchan Aruch).

=== Mezuzah ===
- Mezuzot are placed vertically rather than slanting, except among Spanish and Portuguese Jews in western countries.

=== Liturgy ===
- In many of the prayers, Sephardim preserve Mishnaic Hebrew vocalization and have mostly not altered them to conform with the rules of Biblical Hebrew: examples are "Naqdishakh" (not "Naqdishkha") and "ha-Gefen" (not "ha-Gafen"). (Note: This was also the case in Ashkenazi communities until the Renaissance, when scholars such as Shabbetai Sofer published prayer books with the text deliberately altered to meet the standard of Biblical Hebrew as set by the Masoretes.)
- Sephardim read/chant most of the prayers end to end out loud, unlike the Ashkenazi practice that the Hazan reads the first line out loud, followed by silent reading, and finishing up by reading the last few lines out loud before moving to the next prayer.
- Sephardim start Mincha with Patach Eliyahu, Leshem Yihud, Ma Yedidot,L Korban HaTamid, and Parashat HaKtoret before Ashrei. While Patach Eliyahu is sometimes omitted, the other prayers are standard practice by most Sephardim.
- Friday evening, most Sephardi groups (but not the Spanish and Portuguese) sing the Shir hashirim between Minha and Kabbalat Shabbat. L
- The order of the prayers in the pesukei dezimra differs from the Ashkenazi practice and includes some additional prayers.
- Close to the end of the zemirot, the Sephardi Hazan doesn't sing Shoken ad. Instead, Shavat aniyim is sung. It has many melodies that vary by the weekly maqam in the Eastern communities.
- Before the Amida, they don't say "Tzur Yisrael."
- The second blessing before the Shema begins "Ahavat ʿOlam" (and not "Ahavah Rabbah") in all services.
- Many Sephardim don't take three steps back and three steps forward before the Amidah nor bend their knees.
- In the summer months they use the words Morid ha-Ṭal in the second blessing of the Amida. P
- The Qedushah of the morning service begins "Naqdishakh ve-Naʿariṣakh", and the Qedushah of musaf (the additional service for Shabbat and festivals) begins "Keter Yitenu L'kha".
- There are separate summer and winter forms for the "Birkat ha-Shanim".
- There is no Priestly Blessing in minḥa (the afternoon service) on any day. P
- In most communities, Kohanim say the Priestly Blessing daily during Shaharit and Musaf, even outside of Israel, unlike the Ashkenazi practice of saying it only on the major Festivals. However, in Spanish and Portuguese communities, it is recited only on festivals like Ashkenazim, and in some communities, it is done on Shabbat but not during the week.
- The last blessing of the Amida is "Sim Shalom" (and not "Shalom Rav") in all services.
- In most communities (except for Spanish and Portuguese) since the times of the Ari, the short Tahanun includes the Vidui, the Thirteen Attributes, and Psalm 25, among others.L The order of the long Tahanun varies based on the particular rite and includes three additional Thirteen Attributes. Most communities stand for the beginning of Tahanun (including the Vidui, the Thirteen Attributes) and sit erect (without resting their head on their arm) for Psalm 25, but customs vary between communities.
- When removing the Torah from the Ark on Shabbat, most Sephardic communities recite "Ata horeta ladaat."
- Some of the haftara readings are different than the Ashkenazi practice.
- Close to the end of the Musaf service, Sephardim read Kol Yisrael before Ein Keloheinu.
- The Hazan calls Barechu before the ʿAleinu.
- After Aleinu, some Sephardim say Uvtorateha Hashem Elokeinu katuv leimor Shemaʿ ...
- Most Sephardim sit for Kaddish unless they were standing previously.
- The Kaddish is longer and the congregation responds "amen" after "berikh hu."
- Adon Olam has an extra stanza, and is longer still in Oriental communities.
- Shalom aleichem has an extra stanza.
- The verses recited at the beginning of Havdala differ from the Ashkenazi practice.
- The blessing before Hallel concludes with לגמור את ההלל, rather than לקרא את ההלל.

=== Torah scroll ===
- In many communities (mostly Mizrahi rather than Sephardi proper) the Torah scroll is kept in a tiq (wooden or metal case) instead of a velvet mantle.
- They lift the Torah scroll and display it to the congregation before the Torah reading rather than after. B

=== Synagogue ===
- Typically, the Torah reading platform, which Sephardim generally call Teva/Teba, is traditionally not in the front of the sanctuary but in the center or back of it.
- In Middle Eastern communities, the Torah is read on a horizontal box also called the Teva/Teba rather than a slanted table as the Ashkenazi or Western Sephardic tradition.
- The ark where the Torah scrolls are stored is called Hekhal (also Hekhal kodesh in the Greek and Turkish communities), rather than Aron kodesh.

=== Torah service ===
- Before an aliya, many sephardim say Hashem imachem.
- After an aliya some say emet toratenu haqedosha.
- The blessing after the ʿAliya may include Torato before Torat emet.
- After an ʿAliya, the ʿoleh is congratulated by other congregants with Hazak uvaruch rather than Yasher koach and the ole responds with “Hazak ve'ematz”, or “Baruch tehiye”.
- Most Sephardim remain seated when the 10 Commandments are being read. However Western Sephardim (UK and the Netherlands) stand, similar to Ashkenazim.

=== Kashrut ===
- Sephardim distinguish rice from kitniyyot.
  - While Mizrachi Jews generally eat rice on Passover, many Spanish, Portuguese, Greek, Turkish, and North African Sephardim do not.
  - Most Sephardim regard it as permissible to eat fresh Kitniyot (legumes and seeds such as green beans and fresh peas or maize) on Passover.
  - The custom of eating dried legumes on Passover varies between communities, it is independent of the custom of eating rice.
  - Some (particularly Persians) have the custom to avoid chickpeas, because its name sounds like hames.
  - Some Greek and Turkish Sephardim have the custom to also avoid potatoes on Passover.
- Many Sephardim avoid eating fish with milk, as in Eastern Mediterranean countries this is widely considered to be unhealthy (by non-Jews as well as Jews). Ashkenazim and Western Sephardim argue that this practice originated from a mistake in the Bet Yosef, and that the prohibition really concerned the eating of fish with meat.
- The laws of sheḥitah are in some respects stricter and in other respects less strict than those of Ashkenazim (modern kashrut authorities try to ensure that all meat complies with both standards).
- The Sephardi definition of bread is significantly stricter than the Ashkenazi one. Many challot consumed by Ashkenazim on Shabbat contain too much egg, sugar, raisin, even chocolate to Sephardi standards and are considered cake (uga, עוגה) rather than bread (lechem, לחם). Therefore the hamotzi lechem (המוציא לחם) blessing cannot be said over it and in turn the kiddush is not valid. Ashkenazi hosts are encouraged to be sensitive to this difference when having Sephardi guests over.

=== Holidays ===
Yamim Noraim

- Seliḥot are said throughout Elul in the morning rather than at night.
- Around Rosh Hashanah, the typical new year greeting is "Tizku leshanim rabot" (תזכו לשנים רבות). The answer is "Neʿimot vetovot" (נעימות וטובות).
- Sephardic Rishonim (medieval scholars) reject the customs of Tashlikh and Kapparot, though they were re-introduced by the Lurianic Kabbalah. Spanish and Portuguese Jews still do not observe them.

Hanukkah

- Only one set of Hanukkah lights is lit in each household.
- The shammash is generally lit after the other Hanukkah lights and after singing Hannerot hallalu, instead of being used to light them (which would be impractical, given that the lights are traditionally oil lamps rather than candles).

Passover

- Sephardim only say blessings over the first and third cups of Passover wine, instead of over all four.
- The items on the Seder plate are arranged in a fixed hexagonal order (except among Spanish and Portuguese Jews: this usage is increasingly popular among Ashkenazim). L

Counting of the ʿOmer period

- During the Counting of the ʿOmer period, observant Sephardi men avoid cutting their hair and shaving/cutting their beard for 34 days, rather than 33, as the Ashkenazi practice.

=== Life cycle ===
==== Birth and naming ====
- The naming ceremony of a girl is called Zebed habbat/Zeved habbat in Hebrew and las Fadas in Spanish and Judeospanyol. In some communities (e.g., Hamburg) it happens on the 30th day after birth. The core elements are Shir hashirim 2:14 (and for a first-born girl, 6:9) and a Mi shebberakh referring to the matriarchs for the naming of the girl. Each community has various additional elements to the ceremony.

==== Marriage ====
- The bride does not traditionally circle the groom.

==== Bereavement ====
- The Sephardi term of commemorating a close relative's death is nahala (נחלה) or meldado. Ashkenazim use the Yiddish term Yahrzeit instead.
- The common Sephardi greeting to express a condolence is Min hashamayim tenuhamu (מן השמים תנוחמו).
- If a relative passed away in the month of Adar, in a leap year, most Sephardim commemorate it in Adar II rather than the Ashkenazi practice of Adar I or both.
- The Sephardi memorial prayers (Hashkabot) serve a similar role to the Ashkenazi Yizkor.

=== Given names ===
- Sephardim often name their children after living grandparents, which is a great respect. On the other hand, Ashkenazim never name their children after a living person.

== Bibliography ==
=== Rabbinic works ===
==== Halachah ====
- Abudirham, David, Sefer Abudirham
- Yosef Karo, Shulḥan Arukh (innumerable editions)
- Ḥayim, Joseph, Ben Ish Ḥai, tr. Hiley (4 vols.): Jerusalem 1993 ISBN 1-58330-160-7
- Sofer, Ḥayim, Kaf ha-Ḥayim
- Rakaḥ, Yaakob, Shulḥan Leḥem ha-Panim (6 vols., ed. Levi Nahum), Jerusalem
- Jacobson, B. S., Netiv Binah: Tel Aviv 1968
- Dayan Toledano, Pinchas, Fountain of Blessings, a Code of Jewish Law, mekor bracha: London 1989, Jerusalem 2009 (edited and expanded to 4 volumes).
- Toledano, E., and Choueka, S., Gateway to Halachah (2 vols.): Lakewood and New York 1988–9. ISBN 0-935063-56-0
- Yitzhak, Hertzel Hillel, Tzel HeHarim: Tzitzit: New York, Feldheim Publishers 2006. ISBN 1-58330-292-1
- HaLevi, Ḥayim David, Mekor Ḥayim haShalem, a comprehensive code of Jewish law
  - Kitzur Shulḥan Arukh Mekor Ḥayim, a digest of the above code
- Yosef, Ovadia, Ḥazon Obadiah, Yabbia Omer and Yeḥavveh Da'at, responsa
- Yosef, Yitzḥak, Yalkut Yosef, codifying rulings of Ovadia Yosef
- Yosef, David, Torat Ha-Mo'adim (rules about the Jewish holidays)
- Yosef, David, Halachah Berurah, another codification of Rabbi Ovadia Yosef's rulings

==== Kabbalah ====
- Vital, Ḥayim, Sha'ar ha-Kavvanot (vol. 8 of the 15 volume collected writings)
- anon., Ḥemdat Yamim
- Algazi, Yisrael, Shalme Tsibbur and Shalme Ḥagigah

==== Local customs ====
- Mueller, J., Ḥilluf Minhagim she-bein Benei Bavel u-Venei Eretz Yisrael: 1878
- Lewin, B. M., Otzar Ḥilluf Minhagim: Thesaurus of Halachic Differences between the Palestinian and Babylonian Schools: Jerusalem 1942
- Gaguine, Shem Tob, Keter Shem Tob, 7 vols. (Spanish and Portuguese and comparative): vols. 1-2, vol. 3, vol. 6, vol. 7
- Ben Ya'akov, Abraham, Minhage Yahadut Bavel ba-dorot ha-aḥaronim (Iraq)
- Ades, Abraham, Derech Ere"ts: Bene Berak 1990 (Aleppo)
- Ben Shimon, Refael Aharon, Nehar Mitzrayim (Egypt): vol. 1, vol. 2
- Hacohen, Mosheh, Berit Kehunah, 1941 (Jerba)
- Messas, Yosef, Mayim Ḥayim (Morocco)
- Toledano, Shelomo, Divre Shalom ve-Emet: Pisqe Ḥachme Marocco (Morocco)
- Bitton, Eliyahu, Netivot ha-Ma'arav (Morocco)

=== Prayer books ===
See List of Sephardic prayer books.

=== Sidurim en hebreo, espanol y fonetica, segun la tradicion sefaradi hispano portuguesa ===
- Sidur Kol Gael leShabat, 2019: En hebreo, espanol y fonetica, En Sto Dgo, D.N. Rep. Dom. -New York City, EE UU - 2012-2019, Según las enseñanzas de: Jhajam Yits’jhak de Souza Britto, Rev. Jhajam David de Aharon de Sola Pool y Rev. Jhajam Dr. Moses Gaster. En Amazon (en tapa dura y version kindle).https://a.co/d/0aTrbbtm
- Sidur Kol Gael para rezos diarios, 2019: En hebreo, espanol y fonetica, En Sto Dgo, D.N. Rep. Dom. -New York City, EE UU - 2012-2019, Según las enseñanzas de: Jhajam Yits’jhak de Souza Britto, Rev. Jhajam David de Aharon de Sola Pool y Rev. Jhajam Dr. Moses Gaster. En Amazon (en tapa dura y version kindle).https://a.co/d/09SYdKVY
- Majhazor Kol Gael lePesajh, 2023: En hebreo, espanol y fonetica, En Pennsylvania, EE UU - 2023, Según las enseñanzas de: Rev. Jhajam David de Aharon de Sola Pool y Rev. Jhajam Dr. Moses Gaster. En Amazon (en tapa dura y version kindle).https://a.co/d/0aNQRed3
- Majhazor Kol Gael leShabu'ngot, 2023: En hebreo, espanol y fonetica, En Pennsylvania, EE UU - 2023, Según las enseñanzas de: Rev. Jhajam David de Aharon de Sola Pool y Rev. Jhajam Dr. Moses Gaster. En Amazon (en tapa dura y version kindle).https://a.co/d/098dTvDH
- Majhazor Kol Gael leSukkot, 2023: En hebreo, espanol y fonetica, En Pennsylvania, EE UU - 2023, Según las enseñanzas de: Rev. Jhajam David de Aharon de Sola Pool y Rev. Jhajam Dr. Moses Gaster. En Amazon (en tapa dura y version kindle).https://a.co/d/0cPeRrMy
- Majhazor Kol Gael Jhol Hamo'nged, 2023: En hebreo, espanol y fonetica, En Pennsylvania, EE UU - 2023, Según las enseñanzas de: Rev. Jhajam David de Aharon de Sola Pool y Rev. Jhajam Dr. Moses Gaster. En Amazon (en tapa dura y version kindle).https://a.co/d/0axqxsTV
- Majhazor Kol Gael Rosh HaShana, 2023: En hebreo, espanol y fonetica, En Pennsylvania, EE UU - 2023, Según las enseñanzas de: Rev. Jhajam David de Aharon de Sola Pool y Rev. Jhajam Dr. Moses Gaster. En Amazon (en tapa dura y version kindle).https://a.co/d/06rDlef0
- Sidur Kol Gael haShalem, 2024: En hebreo, con instrucciones en espanol. En Pennsylvania 2024, Según las enseñanzas de: Jhajam Yits’jhak de Souza Britto, Rev. Jhajam David de Aharon de Sola Pool y Rev. Jhajam Dr. Moses Gaster. En Amazon (en tapa dura y version kindle) (Sidur Completo).https://a.co/d/03gTwiXb
- Majhazor Kol Gael Yom HaKipurim, 2024 (en produccion).

=== Secondary literature ===
- Angel, Marc D., Voices in Exile: A Study in Sephardic Intellectual History: New York 1991
- R. Chouraqui. "The Leadership and Traditions of the Sephardi Sages in the Modern Era." Conversations 1.7 (2010): n. pag. Web. <http://www.jewishideas.org/articles/leadership-and-traditions-sephardi-sages-modern-era>.
- Dobrinsky, Herbert C., A treasury of Sephardic laws and customs : the ritual practices of Syrian, Moroccan, Judeo-Spanish and Spanish and Portuguese Jews of North America. Revised ed. Hoboken, N.J.: KTAV; New York, N.Y.: Yeshiva Univ. Press, 1988. ISBN 0-88125-031-7
- Ferziger, Adam S. (Spring 2001). "Between 'Ashkenazi' and Sepharad: An Early Modern German Rabbinic Response to Religious Pluralism in the Spanish-Portuguese Community". Studia Rosenthaliana. 35 (1). Amsterdam University Press: 7–22. JSTOR 41482436.
- Ginzberg, Louis, Geonica: New York 1909
- Goldschmidt, Meḥqare Tefillah u-Fiyyut (On Jewish Liturgy): Jerusalem 1978
- Lavie, Smadar. Wrapped in the Flag of Israel: Mizrahi Single Mothers and Bureaucratic Torture. Lincoln: University of Nebraska Press, 2018. ISBN 978-1-4962-0554-4
- Mauroof, Joshua, Rabbi. "Sephardic Tradition - The Judaism of the Future." University of Maryland. 28 Mar. 2013. Lecture. <https://www.youtube.com/watch?v=WG10ZhFN4tM>.
- Reif, Stefan, Judaism and Hebrew Prayer: Cambridge 1993. Hardback ISBN 978-0-521-44087-5, ISBN 0-521-44087-4; Paperback ISBN 978-0-521-48341-4, ISBN 0-521-48341-7
- Reif, Stefan, Problems with Prayers: Berlin and New York 2006 ISBN 978-3-11-019091-5, ISBN 3-11-019091-5
- Tabori, Yosef, "The influence of the expulsion from Spain on prayer rites" (Hebrew) in the Rambi catalog.
- Wieder, Naphtali, The Formation of Jewish Liturgy: In the East and the West
- Zimmels, Ashkenazim and Sephardim: their Relations, Differences, and Problems As Reflected in the Rabbinical Responsa : London 1958 (since reprinted). ISBN 0-88125-491-6

== See also ==
- Nusach
- Yeshiva#Sephardi yeshivas
- Yeshiva#Israel
- Sephardic Haredim
- Sephardic Hasidim
- Spanish-Portuguese Jews in the United States
