= Adadi =

Adadi (Hebrew: אדאדי) was the name of a rabbinical family in Tripoli, Libya. Notable people with the surname include:

- Abraham Hayyim Adadi (1801–1874)
- Nathan Adadi (1740–1818)
- Saul Adadi (1850–1918)

== Other uses ==
- Adadi Mariam, Ethiopian church
