= Kitzur Shulchan Aruch (disambiguation) =

Kitzur Shulchan Aruch is written by Rabbi Shlomo Ganzfried.

Kitzur Shulchan Aruch or its alternative transliterations may also refer to:

- A similar Sephardi work entitled "Kitzur Shulchan Aruch" by Rabbi Raphael Baruch Toledano
- The "Kitzur Shulchan Aruch Mekor Hayyim" by Rabbi Hayim David HaLevi
- The volumes entitled "Kitzur Shulchan Aruch" from Yalkut Yosef
