= Jacob Rakkah =

Libyan Hakham

Hakham Jacob Rakkaḥ
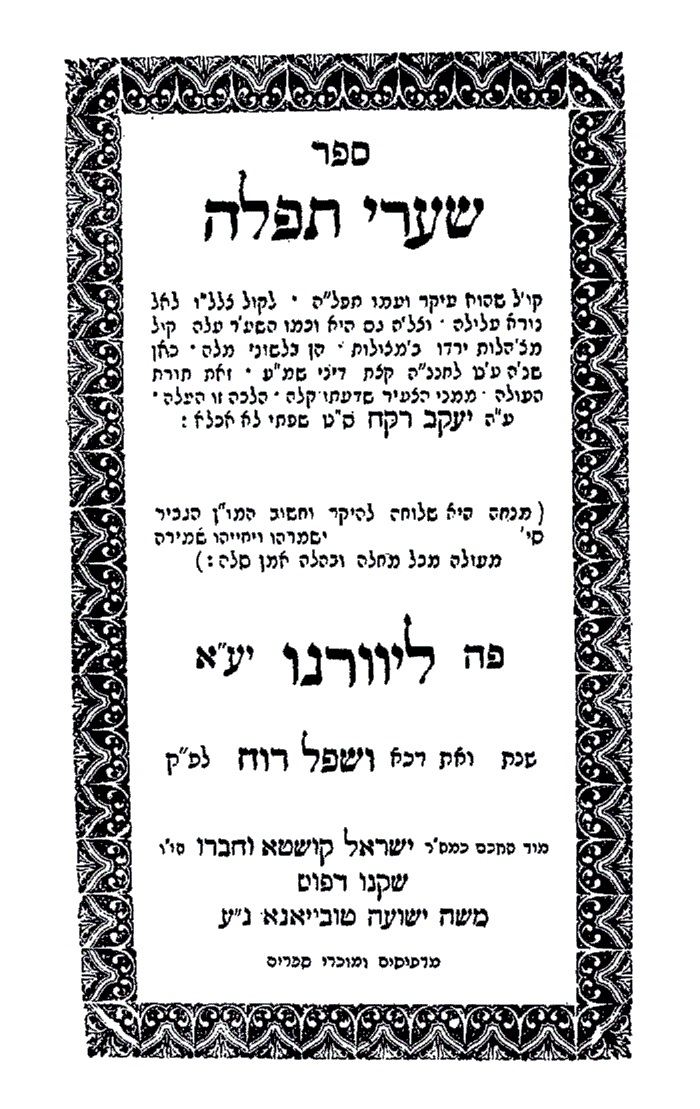
- Title page of Shaarei Tefilla by Rabbi Jacob Rakkaḥ

Personal life
- Born: Yaakov Rakkaḥ; 1800 Tripoli
- Died: 3 March 1891 (aged 90–91) Tripoli
- Parent: Rabbi Shlomo Rakkaḥ

Religious life
- Religion: Judaism
- Position: Rosh yeshiva

Jacob Rakkaḥ (Hebrew: יעקב רקח, Yaakov Rakkaḥ) (1800 – 3 March 1891), also spelled Raccah, was a Sephardi Hakham in the 19th-century Jewish community of Tripoli, Libya. He was a well-known posek (arbiter of Jewish law) for Sephardi Jews, a rosh yeshiva, and author of approximately 40 sefarim, some of which were published during his lifetime.

== Biography ==
Jacob Rakkaḥ was the son of Rabbi Solomon (Shlomo) Rakkaḥ and the great-great-grandson of Rabbi Mas'ud Hai Rakkah, author of Ma'aseh Rokeaḥ, who had come to Libya as a shadar (rabbinical emissary) from Palestine and stayed to lead the Jewish community in Tripoli for 20 years. Jacob's brother, Zion, was also a Torah scholar.

Like other Tripoli rabbis, Rakkaḥ did not wish to be supported by the community, and lived a life of poverty. He worked as an accountant for a large firm.

He was known as a great Torah scholar and posek (arbiter of Jewish law). His depth of knowledge was exemplary; his halakhic opinions usually relied on tens of, and occasionally over 100, poskim who preceded him. His halakhic opinions are still cited today; the Siddur Od Avinu Hai (Hebrew: עוד יוסף חי), published by Machon Hai Hai, is based on his emendations to the nusach and laws of prayer for Sephardi Jews.

Rakkaḥ founded at his own expense Yeshiva Rabbi Yaakov Tripoli, which housed an estimated 1,000 seforim and valuable manuscripts. The yeshiva convened nightly and craftsmen gathered to learn the weekly Torah portion on Shabbat. The yeshiva was destroyed by a bomber during World War II.

In 1863 Rakkaḥ published the third volume of his great-great-grandfather's halakhic work, Ma'aseh Rokeaḥ. His cousin and contemporary, Hakham Abraham Hayyim Adadi, who was a great-grandson of Mas'ud Hai Rakkaḥ, published the second volume of Ma'aseh Rokeaḥ in 1862.

Rakkaḥ was a contemporary of many great rabbis in Tripoli and other countries. From his writings, it is evident that he had a close correspondence with Rabbi Chaim Palagi and Rabbi Benjamin Pontremoli, author of Petach HaDvir. In Tripoli, his contemporaries were Rabbi Frajallah Dabush, Shalom Agib, Joseph Rubin, and others.

Jacob Rakkah had 2 sons: Rabbi Abraham Rakkah and Rabbi Kamus Rakkah.

His Hilula (commemoration of the day of death) on 23 Adar is celebrated each year in one of the Israeli moshavs populated by Libyan Jewish emigres.

== Selected bibliography ==
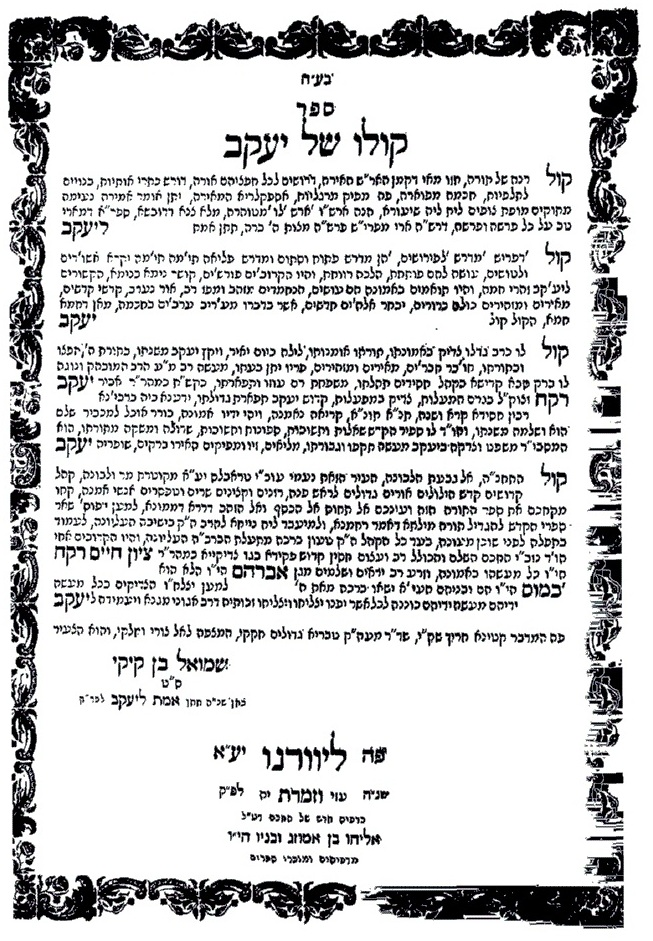
Kolo Shel Yaakov by Rabbi Jacob Rakkaḥ

- Shaarei Tefilla (1870), concerning laws of prayer, nusach, and minhagim
- Vayaged Yaakov (1869), on the Hebrew month of Nisan, the Passover Haggadah, the Counting of the Omer, Birkat HaIlanot, and Birkat Hachama
- Derech Chaim (1860)
- Pirsumei Nisa (1860), on the Hebrew month of Nisan and the Passover Haggadah
- Shulchan Lechem HaPanim (7 volumes), notes and original insights on the Shulchan Aruch
- Maateh Tehilla (1858), commentary on the Book of Psalms
- Kishurim LeYaakov (1858), collection of prayers, elegies, and ethical discussions
- Kol Yaakov (1852), commentary on the Torah
- Pri Etz Hadar, on the laws of Tu BiShvat
- Tov Lehodot, commentary on the Book of Psalms
- Kolo Shel Yaakov, commentary on the Torah
- Bikkurim LaShem
- Michtav LeYaakov
- Minei Merkachat
- HaOrach Mishor
- Yeshuot Yaakov
- Derech Yashar

== Rakkah-Adadi family tree ==
Aharon Rakkah
Mas'ud Hai Rakkah
Yitzhak Rakkah	Nathan Adadi
Baruh Rakkah	Mas'ud Hai Adadi
Shilomo Rakkah	Abraham Hayyim Adadi
Jacob Rakkah	Zion Rakkah	Saul Adadi
Abraham Rakkah	Meir Rakkah
