= Masʽud Hai Rakkaḥ =

Hakham Masʽud Hai Rakkaḥ
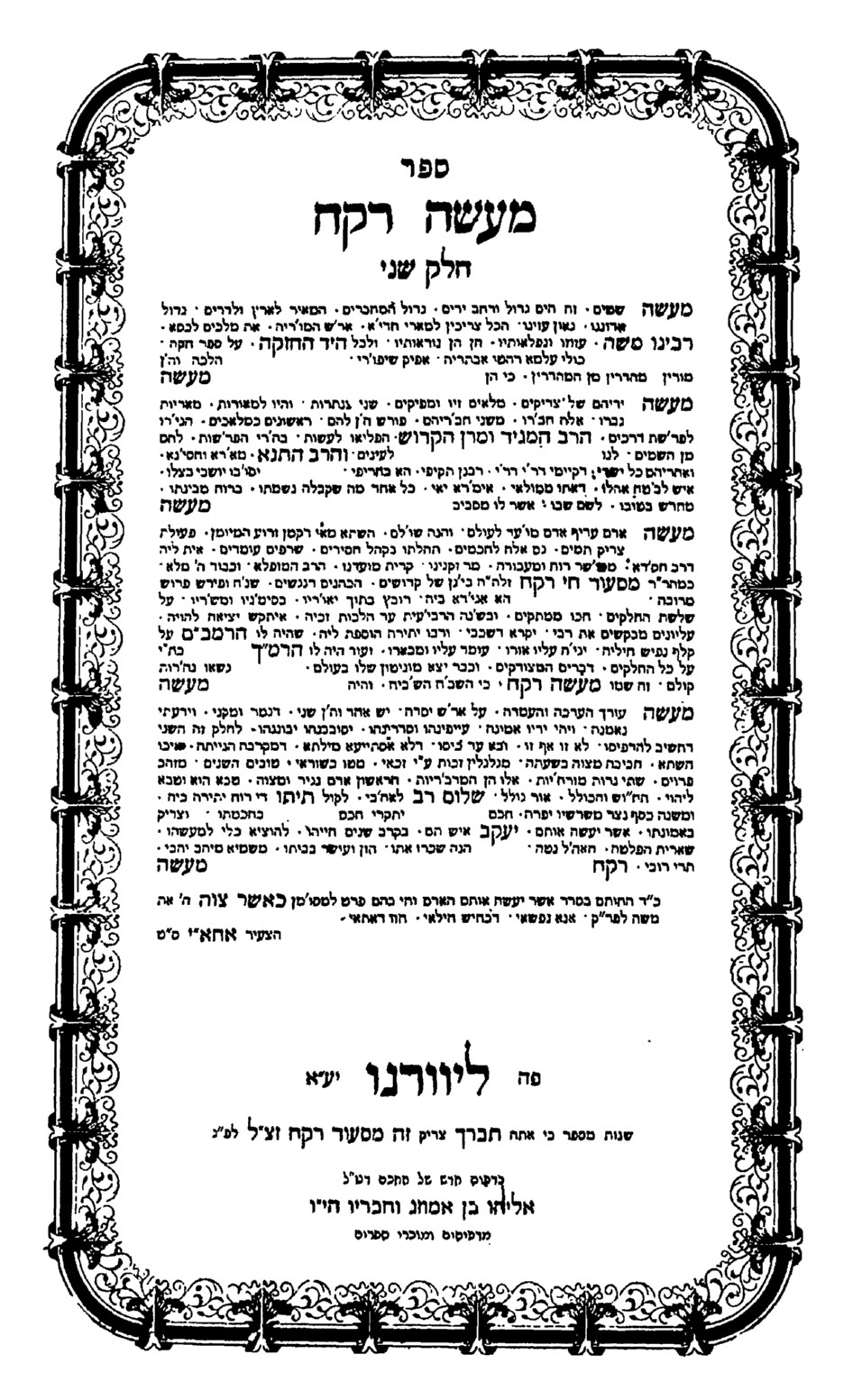
- Title page of Maʽaseh Rokeaḥ, Volume 2, by Hakham Masʽoud Hai Rakkaḥ

Personal life
- Born: Masʽud Hai Rakkah; 1690 Smyrna, Turkey
- Died: July 24, 1768 (age 78) Tripoli, Libya
- Buried: Tripoli
- Parent: Aharon Rakkah

Religious life
- Religion: Judaism

Jewish leader
- Position: Chief Rabbi and Av Beit Din
- Organisation: Jewish community of Tripoli
- Began: 1749
- Ended: 1768
- Yahrtzeit: 10 Av 5528

Masʽud Hai Rakkaḥ (Hebrew: מסעוד חי רקח, 1690 – July 24, 1768), also spelled Raccah, was a Sephardi Hakham and shadar (rabbinical emissary) who led the 18th-century Jewish community of Tripoli, Libya, for 20 years. He was considered one of Libya's leading rabbis and is credited with laying the foundation for that community's development into one of "sages, scribes, and kabbalists". He is the author of Maʽaseh Rokeaḥ (Hebrew: מעשה רקח), a four-volume commentary on Maimonides's Mishneh Torah.

== Biography ==
Mas'ud Hai Rakkaḥ was born in Smyrna, Turkey, the son of Aharon Rakkaḥ. According to the Encyclopaedia Judaica, he was likely descended from the Rakkaḥ family of Venice, and married the daughter of Isaac Rakkah. In his youth, he studied under Rabbi Yitzhak Hacohen Rappaport and Rabbi Hayyim Abulafia, developing into a Talmid Chacham of note. He emigrated to Jerusalem with his teacher, Rabbi Rappaport.

When the Jerusalem community experienced difficult economic times, it dispatched shadarim (rabbinical emissaries) to collect funds from the Jewish diaspora. Rakkaḥ was chosen to travel to Jewish communities in North Africa. He set out for Tunisia, Morocco, and Libya, and upon arriving in Tripoli, sent letters to the communities of Venice and Livorno before visiting them as well.

Rakkaḥ arrived in Venice in 1729 and stayed for two years. He next traveled to Livorno, residing there from 1731 to 1736 and serving as one of the city's leaders.

The Libyan Jewish community at that time was at a spiritual nadir. Upon Rakkaḥ's return to Tripoli in 1749, the community leaders asked him to stay and lead them. Rakkaḥ agreed and was appointed Av Beit Din (head of the rabbinical court) and Chief Rabbi of Tripoli. He opened a yeshiva in Tripoli and exerted a strong influence on all Libyan Jews. Rakkaḥ was considered one of Libya's leading rabbis. He trained students who became the future hakhamim and dayanim (rabbinical judges) of North African Jewry, including Hakhamim Nathan Adadi (his son-in-law), Shalom Flus, Moshe Lachmish, Binyamin Vaturi, and David Tayyar. Rakkaḥ's descendants further built the Libyan Jewish community, including his great-grandson, Abraham Hayyim Adadi, Av Beit Din of Tripoli, and his great-great-grandson, Jacob Rakkah, a leading Sephardi posek (arbiter of Jewish law) and author of approximately 40 sefarim.

Rakkaḥ served the Libyan Jewish community for 20 years until his death on July 24, 1768 (10 Av 5528) at the age of 78. He is buried in Tripoli.

== Works ==
Rakkaḥ saw the publication of the first volume of the Ma'aseh Rokeaḥ (Hebrew: מעשה רקח), his novellae and commentary on Maimonides' Mishneh Torah, in Venice in 1742-1743. Volume 2 was published by his great-grandson, Abraham Hayyim Adadi, in Livorno in 1862. Volume 3 was published in Livorno in 1863 by his great-great-grandson, Jacob Rakkah. Volume 4 was published in Jerusalem in 1964 by Rabbi Shmuel Akiva Yaffe-Schlesinger. The inscription on Rakkaḥ's gravestone appears at the beginning of Volume 4.

Rakkaḥ's novellae on the Talmud, commentary on the Five Megillot, and drashot (sermons) remained in handwritten manuscripts, some of which were lost.

== Rakkah-Adadi family tree ==
Aharon Rakkah
Mas'ud Hai Rakkah
Yitzhak Rakkah	Nathan Adadi
Baruh Rakkah	Mas'ud Hai Adadi
Shilomo Rakkah	Abraham Hayyim Adadi
Jacob Rakkah	Zion Rakkah	Saul Adadi
Abraham Rakkah	Meir Rakkah
