= List of Sephardic prayer books =

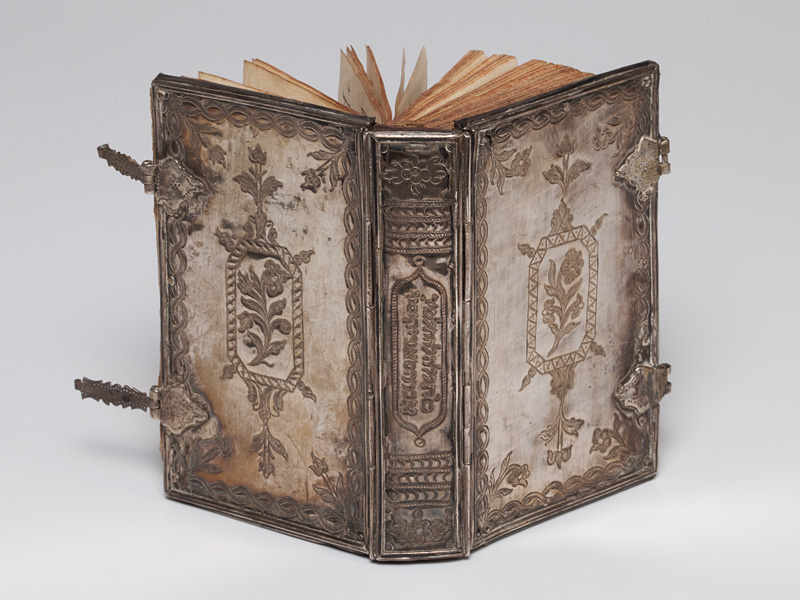
1803 Sephardic prayer book, in the Jewish Museum of Switzerland’s collection.

This List of Sephardic prayer books is supplementary to the article on Sephardic law and customs. It is divided both by age and by geographical origin. For the evolution of the laws and customs of prayer in Sephardic communities, see the main article.

== Early rites ==
- Seder Rab Amram Gaon, ed. Hedegard: Lund 1951
- Seder Rab Amram Gaon, ed. Kronholm: Lund 1974
- Seder Rab Amram Gaon, ed. Harfenes: Bene Berak 1994
- Seder Rab Amram Gaon, ed. Goldschmidt: Jerusalem 2004
- Seder Saadia Gaon, ed. Davidson, Assaf and Joel: 5th edition, Jerusalem 1985
- Davidson, Maḥzor Yannai: A Liturgical Work of the VIIth Century: New York, Jewish Theological Seminary 1919
- Siddur Rabbenu Shelomoh ben Natan, ed. Haggai: Jerusalem 1995
- Maimonides' order of prayer, contained in Goldschmidt, Meḥqare Tefillah u-Fiyyut (On Jewish Liturgy): Jerusalem 1978

== Older printed editions ==
- Tefillot kol ha-shanah, Lisbon 1490
- Siddur Tefillot: kol beru'e ma'alah u-mattah, Naples 1490 (Kippur only)
- Temunot tehinot tefilot Sefarad, Venice 1524
- Maḥzor le-nosaḥ Barcelona minhag Catalonia, Salonica 1527 (Rosh Hashanah and Kippur only)
- Seder Nashim: es siddur de mujeres en Ladino para todo el año, Salonica 1550
- Seder tefillot le-mo'adim tovim ke-minhag Sefardim, Venice 1635
- Seder meah berakhot, Venice 1780

== Kabbalistic prayer books ==
- Siddur bet tefillah, Constantinople 1735
- Siddur ha-Rasha"sh (many editions, sets out meditations of Shalom Sharabi)
- Tefillat sefat emet, Safed 1832
- Remer, Daniel, Siddur and Sefer Tefillat Ḥayim: Jerusalem 2003 (Hebrew only: reconstructs Lurianic rite from Venice edition of Spanish and Portuguese prayer book and the Sha'ar ha-Kavvanot of Ḥayim Vital; companion volume discusses Ḥasidic variants)

== Livorno editions ==
- Sefer tefillat yesharim: helek rishon, seder tefillot ke-minhag Sefardim Livorno 1800
- Sefer Tefillat Haḥodesh: Livorno 1844
- The Bet Obed series, by Judah Ashkenazi:
  - Bet Obed: Livorno 1843 (daily prayers);
  - Bet Menuḥah (Shabbat);
  - Bet Mo'ed (Pesach, Shavuot and Sukkot);
  - Bet Din (Rosh Hashanah);
  - Bet Kapparah (Yom Kippur);
- Sefer mo'ade Hashem, Livorno 1874
- The Bet El series, by Abraham Ḥamwi:
  - Bet El (seliḥot and morning service for weekdays): Livorno 1878 (repr. New York 1982)
  - Bet Din (Rosh Hashanah): Livorno 1878 (repr. Jerusalem 1986)
  - Bet ha-Kapporet (Kippur): Livorno 1879
  - Bet Simḥah (Sukkot): Livorno 1879 (repr. Jerusalem 1970)
  - Bet ha-Beḥirah (Pesaḥ): Livorno 1880 (repr. Jerusalem 1985)
- Zechor le-Abraham: Livorno 1926 (days of awe only)
  - reprint: Shiloh Publishing, 3 volumes, Rosh Hashanah, Kippur and Shalosh Regalim, date uncertain (reprinted from Livorno plates by Aharon Barznoi, Tel Aviv)

(The Od Abinu Ḥai series, mentioned under "North African Jews" below, is based on these editions.)

== Vienna editions ==
- Seder Tefillah mi-kol ha-shanah ke-minhag K"K Sefardim: Harrasansky 1811; Schmid 1820, 1838
- Maḥzor ke-minhag K"K Sefardim: Schmid 1820-1837
- Seder Tefillah ke-minhag K"K Sefardim: Schmid 1821-1849; Bendiner 1862; Schlesinger 1868-1938
- Siddur Va-ani Tefillah: Schlesinger 1863-1910
- Seder Tefillat ha-Ḥodesh: Netter 1863; Schlesinger 1873-1934
- Bet Tefillah Yiqqare: Schlesinger 1876-1936
- Seder Tefillat Kol Peh: Schlesinger 1879, 1891 (with Ladino translation)

== Spanish and Portuguese Jews ==
(for fuller list see Spanish and Portuguese Jewish prayer books)

- Venice edition, 1524: reproduced in photostat in Remer, Siddur and Sefer Tefillat Ḥayim, above (text reflects some Italian influence, not transmitted in full to modern orders of service)
- Tefillat Kol Peh, ed. and tr. Ricardo: Amsterdam 1928, repr. 1950
- Book of Prayer of the Spanish and Portuguese Jews' Congregation, London (5 vols.): Oxford (Oxford University Press, Vivian Ridler), 5725 - 1965 (Hebrew and English; since reprinted)
- Book of Prayer: According to the Custom of the Spanish and Portuguese Jews, David de Sola Pool: New York, Union of Sephardic Congregations, 1941, 1954, 1979 (Hebrew and English). (The 1960 printing is scanned and available here.)

=== Siddurim in Hebrew and Spanish with Transliteration, according to the Sephardic Iberian Tradition ===
- Sidur Ḳol GaEl, HaShalem hebreo español, Rito Ḳ.Ḳ. Sefaradim, Según la costumbre judia Hispano portuguesa de las Ḳ.Ḳ. T.T. de Latinoamérica. Este sidur contiene los rezos diarios, Shabat, festividades y ciclo de la vida judía, en hebreo con traducción al español. Según las costumbres las comunidades en; Ámsterdam, Londres y América.En Amazon (en tapa blanda y version kindle).https://a.co/d/9PJUsyP
- Sidur Ḳol GaEl, Según el Rito Ḳ.Ḳ. Sefaradim. Según la tradición judía hispano portuguesas de las Ḳ.Ḳ. T.T. de Latinoamérica.
  En hebreo con traducción al español y fonética.Este sidur, contiene los rezos de la semana, Shabat y Rosh Jhodesh, en hebreo con traducción en español y fonética. Según la tradición de los judíos hispanos portugueses de Ámsterdam, Londres y América.En Amazon (en tapa blanda y version kindle).https://a.co/d/1o5rJAN
- Majhazor Kol Gael lePesajh, 2023: En hebreo, espanol y fonetica, En Pennsylvania, EE UU - 2023, Según las enseñanzas de: Rev. Jhajam David de Aharon de Sola Pool y Rev. Jhajam Dr. Moses Gaster. En Amazon (en tapa blanda y version kindle).https://a.co/d/iBou5DE
- Majhazor Kol Gael leShabu'ngot, 2023: En hebreo, espanol y fonetica, En Pennsylvania, EE UU - 2023, Según las enseñanzas de: Rev. Jhajam David de Aharon de Sola Pool y Rev. Jhajam Dr. Moses Gaster. En Amazon (en tapa dura y version kindle).https://a.co/d/2VigWDC
- Majhazor Kol Gael leSukkot, 2023: En hebreo, espanol y fonetica, En Pennsylvania, EE UU - 2023, Según las enseñanzas de: Rev. Jhajam David de Aharon de Sola Pool y Rev. Jhajam Dr. Moses Gaster. En Amazon (en tapa blanda y version kindle).https://a.co/d/8soA89n
- Majhazor Kol Gael Rosh HaShana, 2023: En hebreo, espanol y fonetica, En Pennsylvania, EE UU - 2023, Según las enseñanzas de: Rev. Jhajam David de Aharon de Sola Pool y Rev. Jhajam Dr. Moses Gaster. En Amazon (en tapa dura y version kindle).https://a.co/d/60hjlkz

== Balkan, Greek and Turkish Sephardim ==
- Seder Teffilot, Καθημεριναι Προσευχαι, Siddur according to minhag Corfu with a Greek translation, Corfu 1885
- Siddur Zehut Yosef (Daily and Shabbat) According to the Rhodes and Turkish Traditions, ed. Azose: Seattle, Sephardic Traditions Foundation 2002 (Hebrew and English; some Ladino)
- Mahzor Zihron Rahel (Shalosh Regalim: Pesah, Shavuot and Sukkot) According to the Rhodes and Turkish Traditions, ed. Azose: Seattle, Sephardic Traditions Foundation 2007 (Hebrew and English; some Ladino)
- Mahzor Tefila LeDavid (Rosh Ashana Prayer Book) According to the Rhodes Tradition, ed. Azose: Seattle, Sephardic Traditions Foundation 2011 (Hebrew and English; some Ladino)
- Siddur Tefila LeMoshe (Order of the Five Fasts) According to the Rhodes Tradition, ed. Azose: Seattle, Sephardic Traditions Foundation 2012 (Hebrew and English; some Ladino)
- Mahzor Kol Yaakov (Yom Kippur Mahzor) According to the Rhodes Tradition, ed. Azose: Seattle, Sephardic Traditions Foundation 2014 (Hebrew and English; some Ladino)

(see also under Vienna editions)

== Baghdadi and Kurdish ("Edot ha-Mizraḥ") ==
- Tefillat Yesharim: Jerusalem, Manṣur (Hebrew only) (used by Baghdadi Jews and Zakho Jews)
- Siddur Od Yosef Ḥai
- Kol Eliyahu, ed. Mordechai Eliyahu

(and many others)

== North African Jews ==
- Siddur Od Abinu Ḥai ed. Levi Nahum: Jerusalem (Hebrew only, Livorno text, Libyan tradition).
- Maḥzor Od Abinu Ḥai ed. Levi Nahum (5 vols.): Jerusalem (Hebrew only, Livorno text, Libyan tradition)
- Siddur Vezaraḥ Hashemesh, ed. Messas: Jerusalem (Hebrew only, Meknes tradition)
- Siddur Ish Matzliaḥ, ed. Mazuz, Machon ha-Rav Matzliaḥ : B'nei Brak (Hebrew only, Jerba tradition)
- Siddur Farḥi (Hebrew with Arabic translation, Egypt)
- Siddur Tefillat ha-Ḥodesh, ed. David Levi, Erez : Jerusalem (Hebrew only, Livorno text, Moroccan, Algerian and Tunisian traditions)
- Siddur Patah Eliyahou, ed. Joseph Charbit, Colbo : Paris (Hebrew and French, Moroccan, Algerian and Tunisian traditions)
- Maḥzor Zechor le-Avraham, Yarid ha-Sefarim : Jerusalem (Based on the original Zechor le-Abraham: Livorno 1926, Hebrew only, Moroccan, Algerian and Tunisian traditions, days of awe only)

== Syrian Jews ==
- Seder Olat Tamid (minḥah and arbit only): Aleppo 1907
- Olat ha-Shaḥar: Aleppo 1915
- Bet Yosef ve-Ohel Abraham: Jerusalem, Manṣur (Hebrew only, based on Baghdadi text)
- Maḥzor Shelom Yerushalayim, ed. Albeg: New York, Sephardic Heritage Foundation 1982
- Siddur Kol Mordechai, ed. Faham bros: Jerusalem 1984 (minḥah and arbit only)
- Kol Yaakob: New York, Sephardic Heritage Foundation 1990 (Hebrew); reprinted 1996 (Hebrew and English)
- The Aram Soba Siddur: According to the Sephardic Custom of Aleppo Syria, Moshe Antebi: Jerusalem, Aram Soba Foundation 1993 (contains minḥah and arbit only)
- Orḥot Ḥayim, ed. Yedid: Jerusalem 1995 (Hebrew only)
- Orot Sephardic Siddur, Eliezer Toledano: Lakewood, NJ, Orot Inc. (Hebrew and English: Baghdadi text, Syrian variants shown in square brackets)
- Siddur Abodat Haleb / Prayers from the Heart, Moshe Antebi, Lakewood, NJ: Israel Book Shop, 2002
- Abir Yaakob, ed. Haber: Sephardic Press (Hebrew and English, Shabbat only)
- Siddur Ve-ha'arev Na, ed. Isaac S.D. Sassoon, 2007

== Israeli (Ovadia Yosef) ==
- Ohr V'Derech Sephardic Siddur
- Siddur Yeḥavveh Daat
- Siddur Avodat Ha-shem
- Siddur Ḥazon Ovadia
- Maḥzor Ḥazon Ovadia
- Siddur Kavanat Halev
