= Saul Adadi =

Libyan Jewish leader

Hakham Saul Adadi

Personal life
- Born: Saul Adadi; 1850 Tripoli, Libya
- Died: September 18, 1918 (aged 67–68)
- Buried: Tripoli
- Parent: Abraham Hayyim Adadi

Religious life
- Religion: Judaism
- Position: Rosh yeshiva
- Yahrtzeit: 13 Tishrei 5679

Saul Adadi (Hebrew: שאול עבדיה אדאדי, 1850 – September 18, 1918) was a Sephardi Hakham, rosh yeshiva, and paytan in the 19th-century Jewish community of Tripoli, Libya. He was heavily involved in youth education, founding a yeshiva and co-founding and serving as principal of a Talmud Torah. He preserved the pinkasim (community record books) of the Tripoli Jewish community, unpublished manuscripts of 18th-century Tripoli Jewish leader Rabbi Abraham Khalfon, and sefarim belonging to his father, Hakham Abraham Hayyim Adadi, a senior rabbi of the previous generation.

== Family ==
Saul Adadi was born in Tripoli, the scion of a distinguished rabbinical family. He was the son of Hakham Abraham Hayyim Adadi (1801–1874), head of the Tripoli rabbinical court and author of several halakhic works. He was the great-grandson of Hakham Nathan Adadi (1740–1818), one of the leaders of the Tripoli Jewish community in the 19th century, and the great-great-grandson of Hakham Mas'ud Hai Rakkah (1690–1768), author of Ma'aseh Rokeaḥ, who is credited with laying the foundation for the development of the Jewish community of Tripoli into one of "sages, scribes, and kabbalists". He was a contemporary of Hakham Jacob Rakkah (1800–1891), another great-great-grandson of Mas'ud Hai Rakkah and author of approximately 40 sefarim.

On Lag BaOmer 1870, Adadi's father and mother returned to Safed in the Levant, where the senior Adadi had lived in his younger years and served as a shadar (rabbinical emissary). Saul remained in Tripoli and corresponded with his father until the latter's death in 1874.

== Rabbinic career ==
Adadi founded a yeshiva in Tripoli and served as rosh yeshiva. With secular educational streams making inroads in Tripoli, Adadi, together with Rabbis Zion Tzaror, Mas'ud Jenah, and Nissim Nahum, founded a Talmud Torah called Yagdil Torah in 1893. In its first year, this Talmud Torah enrolled 330 children, and by 1905, when its permanent building was erected, 400 students, mostly from poor families. Adadi was the principal of the school, and was responsible for testing the children once a week and recording their grades to track the success of the program.

Adadi also built a synagogue in Tripoli; a commemorative marker that records his name along with the names of builders of all of the other synagogues built in Tripoli from the Middle Ages until the Second World War appears in the Eitz Chaim synagogue in Or Yehuda, Israel, where many North African Jews settled.

Adadi also composed piyyutim (liturgical poems), and left a volume of piyyutim in manuscript form. He died in Tripoli on September 18, 1918 (13 Tishrei 5679).

== Legacy ==
Scholars have uncovered the pinkasim (community record books) of the Tripoli Jewish community in Adadi's study hall, as well as unpublished manuscripts (ktav yad) of Rabbi Abraham Khalfon, one of the heads of the community in the 18th century. Adadi also preserved the sefarim of his father, which carry his (Saul Adadi's) stamp and which have been sold at auction.

== Rakkah-Adadi family tree ==
Aharon Rakkah
Mas'ud Hai Rakkah
Yitzhak Rakkah	Nathan Adadi
Baruh Rakkah	Mas'ud Hai Adadi
Shilomo Rakkah	Abraham Hayyim Adadi
Jacob Rakkah	Zion Rakkah	Saul Adadi
Abraham Rakkah	Meir Rakkah
