= Nathan Adadi =

Sephardi Hakham, Torah scholar, and kabbalist

Hakham Nathan Adadi

Personal life
- Born: Nathan Adadi; 1740 Palestine
- Died: 1818 (aged 77–78)
- Buried: Safed, Palestine
- Children: Mas'ud Hai Adadi

Religious life
- Religion: Judaism
- Yahrtzeit: 18 Elul 5578

Nathan Adadi (Hebrew: נתן אדאדי; 1740–1818) was a Sephardi Hakham, Torah scholar, and kabbalist in the Jewish community of Tripoli, Libya. He was one of the leaders of the Tripoli Jewish community for some 50 years.

== Early life and family ==
Nathan Adadi was born in Palestine. Little is known about his early life. He served as a shadar and was dispatched to the Jewish community in Livorno, Italy, to collect funds for the Jews of Palestine. Afterwards he traveled to Tripoli, where he became a prominent student of Mas'ud Hai Rakkah, one of the leading rabbis of Libyan Jewry in the 18th century. Rakkaḥ chose Adadi as a son-in-law, and Adadi and his wife had one son, Mas'ud Hai Adadi.

Together with Hakhamim Shalom Plus and Moshe Lachmish, Adadi led the Tripoli Jewish community after Rakkaḥ's death in 1768. Among Adadi's students was Rabbi Yehuda Lavie, a leading rabbi and kabbalist in Tripoli in the 19th century. In 1802 Adadi was appointed to the Tripoli beit din (rabbinical court), but served only for a few days. According to his grandson, Abraham Hayyim Adadi, he "resigned voluntarily because he was a zealot, favoring no man, however rich or prominent".

== Later years and death ==
Adadi's son and daughter-in-law died at a young age, leaving one young son, Abraham Hayyim Adadi (1801-1874). Adadi took the boy into his care and was his primary Torah teacher.

In 1818, Adadi decided to return to Palestine, and his 18-year-old grandson accompanied him. Later that same year, Adadi died in Safed.

== Works ==
Adadi authored numerous works on the Shulchan Aruch, Yoreh De'ah, and Mishnah, including the sefarim Me'orei Natan and Chok Natan, but his writings were not published and were subsequently lost.

Adadi began preparing for publication the second volume of his father-in-law's major work, Ma'aseh Rokeaḥ, a commentary on Maimonides' Mishneh Torah, from handwritten manuscripts, but did not complete the task. His grandson, Abraham Hayyim Adadi, eventually completed the volume and published it in Livorno in 1862.

== Rakkah-Adadi family tree ==
Aharon Rakkah
Mas'ud Hai Rakkah
Yitzhak Rakkah	Nathan Adadi
Baruh Rakkah	Mas'ud Hai Adadi
Shilomo Rakkah	Abraham Hayyim Adadi
Jacob Rakkah	Zion Rakkah	Saul Adadi
Abraham Rakkah	Meir Rakkah
