= Abraham Hayyim Adadi =

Sephardi Hakham

Hakham Abraham Hayyim Adadi אברהם חיים אדאדי
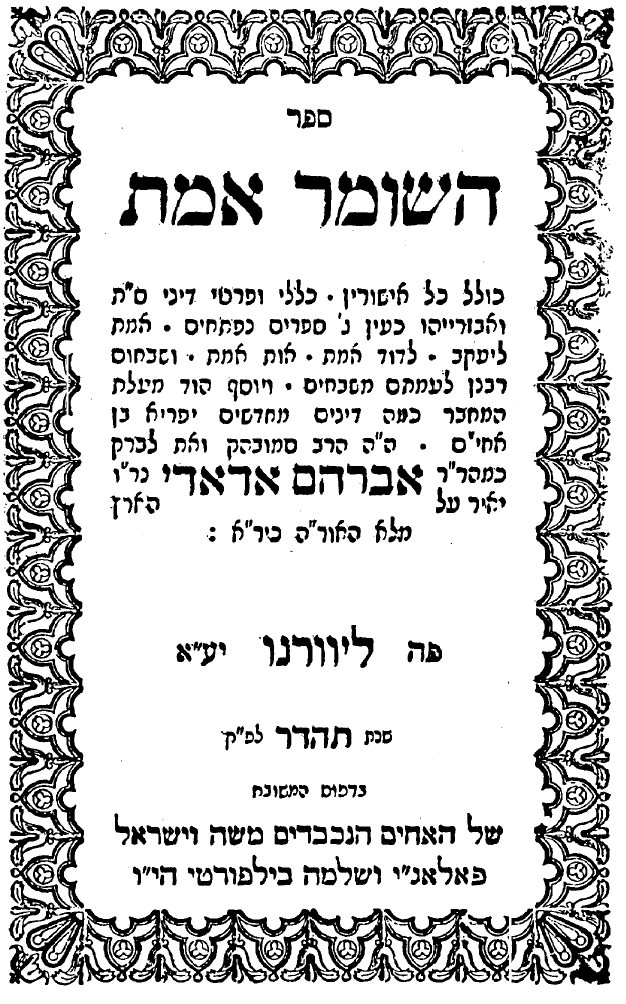
- Title page of HaShomer Emet by Hakham Abraham Hayyim Adadi

Personal life
- Born: Abraham Hayyim Adadi; 1801 Tripoli, Libya
- Died: June 13, 1874 (aged 72–73)
- Buried: Safed, Palestine
- Children: Saul Adadi
- Parent: Mas'ud Hai Adadi

Religious life
- Religion: Judaism
- Position: Dayan, Av Beit Din
- Organisation: Jewish community of Tripoli
- Began: 1838
- Ended: 1870
- Yahrtzeit: 28 Sivan 5634

Abraham Hayyim Adadi (Hebrew: אברהם חיים אדאדי; 1801 – June 13, 1874) was a Sephardi Hakham, dayan (rabbinical court judge), av beit din (head of the rabbinical court), and senior rabbi of the 19th-century Jewish community of Tripoli, Libya. In his younger years, he lived in Safed, Palestine, and traveled to Jewish communities in the Middle East and North Africa as a shadar (rabbinical emissary) to raise funds for the Safed community. He returned to Safed a few years before his death and was buried there. He published several halakhic works and also recorded the local minhagim (customs) of Tripoli and Safed, providing a valuable resource for scholars and historians.

== Biography ==
Abraham Hayyim Adadi was born in Tripoli to Mas'ud Hai Adadi, the son of Hakham Nathan Adadi. Nathan Adadi was originally from Palestine; he came to Tripoli as a shadar (rabbinical emissary) and stayed to learn under Hakham Mas'ud Hai Rakkah, one of the leading rabbis of Libyan Jewry in the 18th century. He married his teacher's daughter and had one son, Mas'ud Hai Adadi. Abraham Hayyim was orphaned of both his parents at a young age and was raised by his grandfather.

In 1818 Adadi accompanied his grandfather to Palestine, where they settled in Safed. His grandfather died that same year. The 18-year-old Abraham Hayyim enrolled in the yeshiva of Rabbi Yosef Karo, received rabbinic ordination, and studied to become a dayan (rabbinical court judge).

In 1830 he was appointed as a shadar to raise funds on behalf of the Safed Jewish community. He traveled to Jewish communities in Syria, Iraq, Persia, Egypt, Tunisia, Morocco, and Livorno, Italy. He was in Livorno at the time of the devastating Safed earthquake of 1837, and decided to return to his native Tripoli. He served the Tripoli Jewish community as a rav, dayan, av beit din, and rosh yeshiva over the next 30 years. He was regarded as the senior rabbi in Tripoli.

Adadi paid special attention to the education of children of Torah scholars and children of the poor. Together with other rabbis, he signed a takkanah calling for each member of the community to contribute 3/1,000th of their income toward youth education. He also appointed a special overseer for the needs of the poor, and levied a 5 percent tax on local merchants to pay for teachers for poor children.

In 1862 Adadi published the second volume of his great-grandfather Mas'ud Hai Rakkaḥ's halakhic work, Ma'aseh Rokeaḥ. His cousin and contemporary, Hakham Jacob Rakkah, a great-great-grandson of Mas'ud Hai Rakkaḥ, published the third volume of Ma'aseh Rokeaḥ in 1863.

In 1870, at the age of 70, Adadi returned to Safed with his wife, while his son, Saul, remained in Tripoli. Adadi died in Safed on Shabbat, June 13, 1874 (28 Sivan 5634), and was buried in the rabbinical section of the Safed cemetery.

== Works ==
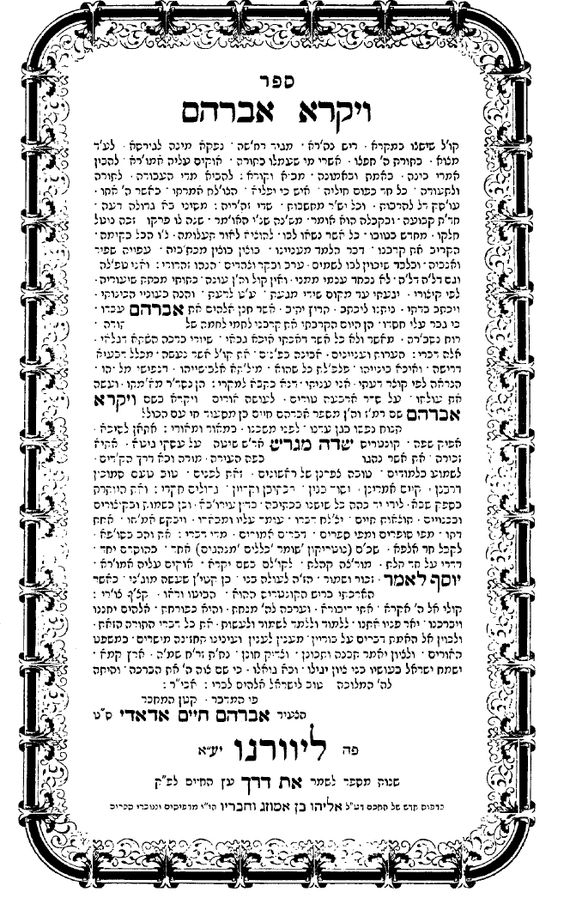
Title page of Vayikra Avraham (1865)

Adadi was recognized as an expert in Talmud study, displaying an understanding of both the text and the historical differences between the writings of the Tannaim and Amoraim. He also recorded the history and minhagim (customs) of the Jewish communities of Tripoli and Safed in his books, providing a valuable resource for scholars and historians. In his first work, HaShomer Emet (1849), he included a poem that he had written in praise of the city of Safed.

His main works are:

- HaShomer Emet (The True Guardian), on the laws and customs of writing a Torah scroll. Published 1849 in Livorno, reprinted together with Vayikra Avraham in 1992 in Brooklyn, New York.
- Vayikra Avraham (And Abraham Called), responsa on the four sections of the Shulchan Aruch. Published 1865 in Livorno, reprinted 1983 in Jerusalem. Appendices in this work include Sdeh Migrash on divorce and Yosef Amar, a description of Libyan Jewish customs.

His handwritten manuscripts containing Talmudic novellae and drashot (sermons) are preserved at the Yad Ben Zvi institute in Jerusalem.

== Rakkah-Adadi family tree ==
Aharon Rakkah
Mas'ud Hai Rakkah
Yitzhak Rakkah	Nathan Adadi
Baruh Rakkah	Mas'ud Hai Adadi
Shilomo Rakkah	Abraham Hayyim Adadi
Jacob Rakkah	Zion Rakkah	Saul Adadi
Abraham Rakkah	Meir Rakkah
