= Hayim David HaLevi =

Israeli rabbi

Rabbi Hayim David HaLevi
- הרב חיים דוד הלוי

Personal life
- Born: 24 January 1924 Jerusalem, Mandatory Palestine
- Died: 10 March 1998 (aged 74)
- Occupation: Chief rabbi

Religious life
- Religion: Judaism
- Denomination: Sephardi Judaism
- School: Porat Yosef Yeshiva

Jewish leader
- Period in office: 1973–1998
- Predecessor: Ovadia Yosef
- Awards: Israel Prize (1997)

Hayim David HaLevi (Hebrew: חיים דוד הלוי; 24 January 1924 – 10 March 1998) was Sephardi chief rabbi of Tel Aviv-Yafo.

== Biography ==
Hayim David HaLevi was born in Jerusalem. He studied under Rabbi Ben-Zion Meir Hai Uziel at the Porat Yosef Yeshiva. When R. Uziel was appointed Sephardi Chief Rabbi of Israel, he hired HaLevi as his personal secretary. HaLevi served in the Israel Defense Forces (IDF) during 1948 Arab-Israeli War.

== Rabbinic career ==
He was appointed chief rabbi of Rishon Le-Zion in 1951. In 1964, he became a member of Israel's Chief Rabbinate Council. He became chief rabbi of Tel Aviv-Yafo in 1973, taking over from R. Ovadia Yosef. HaLevi was known for his clear-headed approach to halakha, particularly relating to the Jewish state. Though unquestionably tied to Sephardi minhag, liturgy and halakha, HaLevi also included Ashkenazi halakhic positions and customs in his books and responsa. HaLevi is said to be the first rabbi to issue a Halachic prohibition on smoking.

== Awards and recognition ==
In 1997, HaLevi was awarded the Israel Prize, for Rabbinical studies.

A street in the Pisgat Ze'ev neighborhood in Jerusalem is named after him

== Published works ==
- Mekor Hayim haShalem, a five-volume account of Jewish law and practice with reasons, in easy language.
- Kitzur Shulchan Arukh Mekor Hayim, a one-volume digest of the above code giving practical conclusions only.
- Aseh L'kha Rav, a collection of responsa.
- Dvar HaMishpat, a commentary on Maimonides's Hilchot Sanhedrin.
- Torat Hayim, three volumes of essays about the weekly parasha and the Jewish holydays.
- Mayim Hayim, responsa
- The life of Rabbi Ben Zion Meir Chai Uziel
- Dat Umidina, (Religion and state) an approach of how to balance religion and state (Published 1968)

== See also ==
- List of Israel Prize recipients
