= Nusach (Jewish custom) =

Text of a Jewish prayer service

In Judaism, a nusach or nusakh (Hebrew: נוסח, romanized: nusáḥ, Yiddish: נוסח, romanized: núsekh, pl. נוסחים nusaḥim, Yiddish: נוסחאות, romanized: nuskhóes) is the exact text of a Jewish prayer service, sometimes translated as "rite". Nusach may more accurately translate to "formulation" or "wording".

The texts of siddurim used by the array of Jewish ethnic divisions and religious movements include Baladi-rite prayer, nusach Ashkenaz, nusach Sefard, nusach edot haMizraḥ, Italian Nusach, and nusach Ari.

A textual nusach is distinct from a musical nusach, the latter referring to a community's musical style or tradition, particularly the chanted melodies used for the Amidah and other recitative prayers.

== Meanings ==
Nusach primarily means "text" or "version", the correct wording of a religious text or liturgy. Thus, the nusach tefillah is the text of the prayers, either generally or in a particular community.

In common use, nusach has come to signify the entire liturgical tradition of the community, including the musical rendition. It is one example of minhag, which includes traditions on Jewish customs of all types.

== Varieties ==
=== Nusach Ashkenaz ===
Nusach Ashkenaz is the style of service conducted by Ashkenazi Jews, who originated between western and eastern Europe. It is the shortest nusach lengthwise, except for the Yemenite Baladi-rite prayer.

It may be subdivided into the German, or western, branch ("Minhag Ashkenaz"), used in West and Central Europe, and the Polish–Lithuanian branch ("Minhag Polin"), used in Eastern Europe, the United States, and among other Ashkenazim, particularly those who identify as Lithuanian in Israel.

The form used in the United Kingdom and the Commonwealth (except Canada, which follows the American style), known as "Minhag Anglia", is technically a subform of "Minhag Polin" but has many similarities to the German rite (e.g., Singer's Siddur).

=== Nusach Sefard ===
Nusach Sefard is a style of prayer service used by some Jews of Central and Eastern European origin, particularly within the Hasidic community. Hasidic Jewry (Hasidim) assimilated a number of Sephardic customs, emulating the practices of the circle of kabbalists associated with Isaac Luria (a.k.a. the Arizal), many of whom resided in the Land of Israel. Textually speaking, it is based largely on the Sephardic rite, but in melody, feel, and pronunciation, it is overwhelmingly Ashkenazi. There is a wide variation within the rite itself among different types of Hasidism, with some more similar to nusach Ashkenaz and others more similar to the Sephardic nusach.

=== Nusach Ari ===
Nusach Ari refers to, in a general sense, any prayer rite following the settings of the Arizal in the 16th century. Many Chabad Hasidim refer to their variant of Nusach Sefard as "Nusach Ari". However, Chabad siddurim invariably note that they are "based on the Ari rite" (על פי נוסח האר"י), a description which appears in many other Sephardic and Hasidic siddurim. The main philosophy that is the basis for Nusach Ari is the idea of "Shaar HaKollel" (שער הכלל), which means the "all inclusive gate." This idea is described by Rabbi DovBer, the Maggid of Mezeritch, who was Rabbi Shneur Zalman of Liadi's teacher. He taught that there are thirteen gates in heaven that correspond to the thirteen gates in the temple gate, through which each Jew's prayer can ascend and reach God. Twelve of those gates for each of the tribes, and each of the twelve Nuschaot that Jews use, and one "Shaar HaKollel", through which any Jew who didn't know his tribe or nusach could enter the temple courtyard or have his prayer ascend to heaven. This idea is central to Chabad in particular, which endeavors to bring traditional Judaism to all Jews. Shaar HaKollel, and Nusach Ari both let Chabad bring prayer to Jews without any problems of tradition or nusach, as any Jew who prays with this nusach has no problem getting their prayer to heaven.

=== Sephardi and Mizrachi nuschaot ===
There is not one generally recognized uniform nusach for Sephardi and Mizrahi Jews. Instead, Sephardim and Mizrahim follow several slightly different but closely related nuschaot.

The nearest approach to a standard text is the siddurim printed in Livorno from the 1840s until the early 20th century. These (and later versions printed in Vienna) were widely used throughout the Sephardic and Mizrahi world. Another popular variant was the text known as Nusach ha-Hida, named after Chaim Yosef David Azulai. Both these versions were particularly influential in Greece, Iran, Turkey, and North Africa. However, most communities also had unwritten customs which they would observe, rather than following the printed siddurim exactly: from the printed materials, it is easy to get the impression that usage in the Ottoman Empire around 1900 was more uniform than it really was.

Other variants include:

- the customs of the Spanish and Portuguese Jews, based on an older form of the Castilian rite, with some influence from the customs both of Italian Jews and of Northern Morocco. This version is distinguished by the near-absence of Kabbalistic elements.
- Nusah Edot Hamizrah, originating among Iraqi Jews but now popular in many other communities. These are based on the opinions of Yosef Hayyim and have a strong Kabbalistic flavour.
- Minhag Aram Soba, as used by Syrian Musta'arabi Jews in earlier centuries (the current Syrian rite is closely based on the Livorno prints).
- the Moroccan rite, also related to the text of the Livorno prints, but with a strong local flavour. This subdivides into the Spanish-speaking northern strip's customs and the country's Arabic-speaking interior and contains fewer Kabbalistic elements than most of the other rites, although more Kabbalistic elements than the Spanish and Portuguese rite.
- formerly, there were variants from different parts of Spain and Portugal, perpetuated in particular synagogues in Thessaloniki and elsewhere, e.g. the Lisbon and Catalan rites, and some North African rites appear to reflect Catalan as well as Castilian influence.

Under the influence of the former Sephardi Chief Rabbi, Rabbi Ovadia Yosef, many Israeli Sephardim have adopted a nusach based mainly on the Nusach Edot Hamizrach but omitting some of the Kabbalistic additions.

=== Nosach Teman ===
A "Temani" nosach was the standard among the Jews of Yemen. This is divided into the Baladi (closer to purely Yemenite) and Shami (adopted from Sephardic siddurim) versions. Both rites are recited using the unique Yemenite pronunciation of Hebrew, which Yemenite Jews and some scholars regard as the most authentic and closely related to the Hebrew of Ancient Israel.

The Baladi rite is very close to that codified by Maimonides in his Mishneh Torah. One form of it is used by the Dor Daim, who attempt to safeguard the older Baladi tradition of Yemenite Jewish observance. This version used by dardaim was initially used by all Yemenite Jews near the time of Maimonides.

=== Nusach Eretz Yisrael ===
In the period of the Geonim, Jews in Israel followed the Nusach Eretz Yisrael which is based upon the Talmud Yerushalmi (Jerusalem Talmud). In contrast, the Jewish diaspora followed the customs of Babylonian Jewry.

The modern Nusach Eretz Yisrael is a recent attempt by Rabbi David Bar-Hayim at reconstructing the ancient Nussach Eretz Yisrael, based on the Jerusalem Talmud and documents discovered in the Cairo Geniza and other sources. The reconstruction and adaption is published in the form of a siddur ("prayer book"), and used by Rabbi Bar-Hayim's Jerusalem followers in public prayers held in Machon Shilo's synagogue.

=== Other nussachim ===
In addition, there are other nuschaot.

- Nussach HaGR"A was a very brief version of Nussach Ashkenaz written by the Vilna Gaon, removing some passages which he believed were not in the original prayer text, correcting some grammatical errors (according to him), and some additional small changes.
- The Minhag Italiani and Minhag Benè Romì are used by some Italian Jews, as well as by a small number of minyanim in Jerusalem and Netanya.
- Closely related to these was the "Romaniote" rite from Greece, where an ancient, pre-Diaspora Jewish community lived. The surviving Romaniote synagogues are in Ioannina, Chalkis, Athens, Tel Aviv, Jerusalem, and New York. These now use a Sephardic rite but with Romaniote variations, selections of a few Romaniote piyyutim, combined with their own melodies and customs and their special form of Byzantine-Jewish Cantillation. There were formerly Romaniote synagogues in Istanbul. (The customs of Corfu are a blend between Romaniote, Apulian, and Sephardic rites.)
- There was once a French nusach, closely related to the Ashkenazi. The rite mostly died out after the expulsion of Jews from France in 1394. Still, certain usages survived on the High holidays only in the Afam community of Northwest Italy until shortly after WWII, and have since become extinct.
- In the Middle Ages, there was a unique Nusach Morocco, unrelated to Sephardic liturgy. This original minhag has not been practiced since shortly after the Expulsion of Jews from Spain, and it is unfortunately not well documented.
- Distinct Persian and Provençal Nuschaot also existed before being gradually replaced by the Edot Hamizrach and Spanish and Portuguese Nuschaot, respectively.
- Until the 16th century, the Aleppo community had its unique prayer rite. After the Jews expelled from Spain arrived, they managed to convince the local community to adopt their practices, and the rite died out completely.
- The Jews of Catalonia had a Nusach distinct from the "standard" Spanish rite. This rite was preserved partially until the 20th century.
- The Urfalim Jews of south eastern Anatolia follow their own prayer rite, which differs from the Syrian, Kurdish, and Iraqi Jewish rites.

It is said among some mystics that an as-yet undisclosed nusach will be revealed after the coming of the Mashiach, the Jewish Messiah. Others say that the differences in nusach are derived from differences between the twelve tribes of Israel, and that in Messianic times each tribe will have its proper nusach. The concept of one nusach for each of the 12 tribes was formulated by R' Isaac Luria; at the time there were exactly 12 Jewish communities in Luria's city of Safed, and each community's nusach was meant to stand in place of that of one of the tribes.

== Halakhot ==
Most halakhic authorities believe that one should follow the nusach of one's family, or at the very least follow one nusach consistently. Rabbi David Bar-Hayim disputes this and permits a Jew to change his nusach at any time, even on a daily basis.

== See also ==
- Minhag
- Siddur
