= Metuentes =

Metuentes (literally fearing) is a term used in "the Latin inscriptions by Juvenal for Jewish proselytes". It corresponds to the Greek term "σεβόμενοι τὸν Θεόν" (English: "respecting God"), which occurs in Josephus, and to the Hebrew "More Yhwh". In the book of Psalms, the expression is used for "the whole body of pious persons outside the house of Israel or ... perhaps for certain Gentiles who had adopted some of the Jewish customs, notably the observance of the Sabbath and abstention from forbidden meat".

== See also ==
- Judaizers – Faction of Jewish Christians
- God-fearer – Greco-Roman sympathizers to Hellenistic Judaism
