= David Bar-Hayim =

Israeli rabbi

Rabbi David Bar-Hayim דוד ב״ר חיים
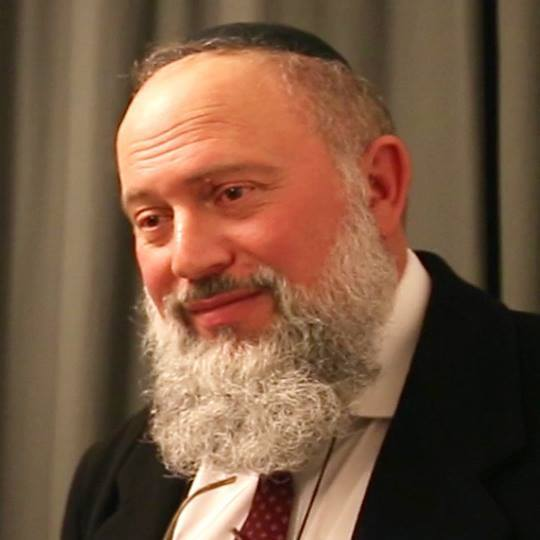

Personal life
- Born: David Mandel; 24 February 1960 (age 66) Sydney, Australia
- Education: Merkaz Harav Kook Yeshiva
- Occupation: Rabbi, Dayan, Posek

Religious life
- Religion: Judaism
- Profession: Av Beit Din at Beth HaWa'adh Rabbinical Court

Jewish leader
- Position: Founder and director
- Organisation: Machon Shilo
- Residence: Neve Daniel, Israel
- Semikhah: Rabbi Yoseph Qaphiḥ

David Chanoch Itzhak Bar-Hayim (Hebrew: דוד חנוך יצחק ב״ר חיים; born Mandel; born 24 February 1960) is an Israeli rabbi who heads Machon Shilo, a Jerusalem-based rabbinical court and institute of Jewish education dedicated to the Torah of Israel.

== Biography ==
=== Early life ===
Bar-Hayim was born in Sydney, Australia.

=== Rabbinical training ===
After moving to Israel in 1977, he initially studied in Yeshivat HaKotel, and subsequently in Merkaz Harav Kook in Jerusalem. He studied under Rabbi Moshe Zuriel, and received rabbinic ordination from Rabbi Yosef Kapach.

=== Rabbinical career ===
For a number of years, Bar-Hayim taught Talmud, Halakha, and Jewish philosophy in Yeshivat Nahalath Tzvi and in Machon Meir.

Bar Hayim lectures in the greater Jerusalem area, and publishes articles in English and Hebrew on various web sites.

Since 2001, Bar-Hayim has been working along with Machon HaYerushalmi to publish a new and elucidated edition of the Jerusalem Talmud.

In 2006, Bar-Hayim founded the Shilo Institute for the research, elucidation, and dissemination of the Torah of Israel.

Bar-Hayim established the Beth HaWa'adh rabbinical court to focus on actualizing the Torah of Israel and serve as an address for Gentiles, particularly the growing Noahide community.

== Halachic approach ==
Though he is Orthodox, Bar-Hayim prefers the terms "Halakhic" or "Torah" Judaism, explaining that the term "Orthodox Judaism” is flawed by its very definition.

Bar-Hayim has proposed the re-establishment of the customs of Israel, religious observances and practices that reflect those of the pre-exile Jewish communities in Israel, rather than those of Babylon or Europe. For this purpose, he has published a prayer book intended to reflect the original composition of early Israel, based upon the Jerusalem Talmud.

== Halachic rulings ==
In light of the fact that Israel is yet again a sovereign Jewish state, with Jerusalem as its capital, Bar-Hayim has argued for increased utilization of the Jerusalem Talmud, which in his opinion, in regard to Torat Eretz Yisrael and Minhagei Eretz Yisrael, contains more lucid rulings than the Babylonian Talmud, which was given supremacy in "exile-mode" Judaism. This has led him to issue a number of highly controversial rulings, some of which are listed below:

- In a very controversial ruling, Bar-Hayim announced that any Jew worldwide, regardless of origin, and despite the practice of their forefathers, may eat kitniyot ("legumes") on Passover, as most Sefardi Jews do, for it is a practice rejected as an unnecessary precaution by some Halachic authorities as early as the time of its emergence. This position has been widely rejected by other rabbis, including Ovadia Yosef.
- When the first day of Sukkot falls on Shabbat, Israeli Jews should follow the Mishna and Jerusalem Talmud's ruling, and perform the lulav ritual.
- Hallel should be recited on Israeli Independence Day.
- Stainless steel utensils do not absorb dairy or meat, and may therefore just be washed with soap and water between dairy and meat use.
- Bar-Hayim claims that the rulings of the Shulchan Aruch were intended as a resource and depiction of common practice in certain areas, and that the author never intended that his rulings become compulsory for Jewry.
- The size of an olive in Jewish law is roughly the size of an olive. Those commentators who over-estimated the size of the olive were unfamiliar with olives, for they had lived in lands which lacked them.
- The process of conversion to Judaism should be one that welcomes sincere converts and allows them the right to choose a rabbi and community which they identify with.
- Jewish law requires one to follow the most convincing position which is truest to the sources. One need not uphold a tradition which can be shown to have been conceived in error.
- The common form of reclining on Passover nowadays does not convey the aristocratic nobility it was intended to, and may often defeat its very purpose.
- The main purpose of Torah study is to create a holy nation that obeys the law, and not merely withdrawn individuals seeking personal gain.
- A blessing is to be recited when removing phylacteries.
- One may eat poultry followed by dairy without a waiting period.
- Torah sages can err, just as the Sanhedrin could (Leviticus 4:13).
- Married women should wear a head covering that is not a wig, since a wig is an invalid form of head covering. It is preferable for a married Jewish woman to expose her hair than to don a wig, for the wig actually increases attraction in the public domain and encourages the notion that Halakha is both irrational and intellectually dishonest.
- One may change his nusach tefillah at any time, because the idea that a Jew should not change his nusach tefillah, and has to continue to pray in the way of his forefathers, is an invented Halacha of the galut (diaspora, "scattering, dispersion").
