= Siddur of Saadia Gaon =

Early (10th century) Jewish prayerbook

The Siddur (prayerbook) of Saadia Gaon is the earliest surviving attempt to transcribe the weekly ritual of Jewish prayers for weekdays, Sabbaths, and festivals (apart from the prayer book of Amram ben Sheshna, of which there is no authoritative text). The text also contains liturgical poetry by Saadia, as well as Judeo-Arabic commentary. There is no known extant manuscript of the entire text, though there is a near complete manuscript in Oxford. Fragments have also been found in the Cairo Geniza. The prayerbook apparently served as a basis for later efforts to codify the Jewish prayer ritual and set it down in writing and was imitated by later authors.

An edition based on these manuscripts has been published by Davidson, Assaf and Yoel in Jerusalem in 1941. The Arabic portions are accompanied by translations into Hebrew in facing columns.

According to David Bar-Hayim, the Birkat Hamazon in the siddur of Saadia Gaon is the shortest known fixed Jewish grace after meals, today.

== See also ==
- Palestinian minhag (Heb.: Minhagei Eretz Yisrael)
