= B. S. Jacobson =

B. S. Jacobson (Bernhard Salomon Jacobson; 5 February 1901 – 6 December 1972), also known as Yissachar Jacobson (Hebrew: יששכר יעקבסון), was a German-born Israeli Jewish educator and author. He taught at Hamburg's Talmud Torah school before immigrating to Mandatory Palestine in 1939. In Palestine and Israel he taught biblical and liturgical studies and wrote on the Torah, prayer, and Jewish education.

== Biography ==
Jacobson was born in Hamburg to a Jewish family. He attended the city's Talmud Torah school and a general secondary school, then studied at a yeshiva in Galanta, the Berlin Rabbinical Seminary, and the universities of Hamburg and Berlin. Health difficulties interrupted his studies, and he did not complete rabbinic ordination, although he qualified as a religious teacher.

In 1925, he began teaching at Hamburg's Talmud Torah school under Joseph Carlebach. He taught both children and adults and produced educational materials for Jewish youth, including publications associated with the Torah Va'Avodah movement. He also translated Jewish religious texts into German. During the 1930s, the school took in increasing numbers of Jewish pupils who had left or been excluded from general schools.

He was arrested during Kristallnacht in November 1938 and held in a concentration camp for fifteen days. After his release, Jacobson left Germany for the Netherlands in December 1938 and immigrated to Mandatory Palestine in 1939.

After arriving in Palestine, Jacobson settled in Tel Aviv, where he taught at the Moriah school, the Talpiot Seminary, and Yeshivat HaYishuv HeHadash. He also gave short weekly lectures on the Torah portion for Kol Yisrael, under the title Lekah Parashatenu. His Friday-evening classes for young people became the basis for his later books on the Torah and the prophetic readings.

He died in Tel Aviv on 6 December 1972 and was buried at Kiryat Shaul Cemetery.

== Teaching and writings ==
According to his pupil Ephraim Yair, Jacobson's teaching method encouraged students to ask questions, compare sources, and reach conclusions through their own study. His written works similarly directed readers to examine primary texts.

His biblical writings addressed questions facing contemporary religious readers. Binah ba-Mikra examined themes from the weekly Torah portions by comparing classical and modern commentaries, including non-Jewish scholarship. His books Hazon ha-Mikra and Le-Va'ayat ha-Gemul ba-Mikra dealt with the haftarot and biblical reward and punishment, respectively. An English translation of Binah ba-Mikra by Z. W. Gotthold was published as Meditations on the Torah.

His educational publications included Madrikh le-Iyyov ve-Kohelet, a guide to Job and Ecclesiastes, and She’elot le-Iyyun bi-Nevi’im Rishonim, study questions on the Former Prophets.

His five-volume Netiv Binah examined the Jewish prayer book, discussing its development, structure, customs, and theological meaning. It also considered the relationship between prayer and modern Jewish experience, including the Holocaust and the establishment of the State of Israel. The fourth and fifth volumes were published after his death.

His German-language educational work Volk und Tora dealt with Jewish history and literature. Printed sheets of the first volume were confiscated by the Gestapo in 1937; the second volume, on Jewish religious philosophy, was first published in Zurich in 1990.

== Reception ==
In a 1956 review of Meditations on the Torah in The Jerusalem Post, Pinchas Peli described Jacobson's approach as organizing commentaries around a central topic or problem. In a 2017 survey of books on prayer, Tzvi Hersh Weinreb described Netiv Binah as a "veritable encyclopedia" of Jewish prayer and recommended it as a reference work. In 2023, Yosef Lindell recommended Meditations on the Siddur as an introductory resource on the history of Jewish prayer.
