= Nusach Eretz Yisrael =

Judaic rite and ritual in medieval Palestine

The Eretz Yisrael minhag, (Hebrew: נוסח ארץ ישראל, translit: Nusach Eretz Yisroel translation: "Rite or Prayer Service of The Land of Israel") as opposed to the Babylonian minhag, refers to the minhag (rite and ritual) of medieval Eretz Yisrael Jews concerning the siddur (traditional order and form of the prayers).

The title of this book reflects the conflict with the Roman authorities in the early C.E. centuries. The Romans pejoratively renamed Eretz Yisrael (land of Israel) after Israel's historic enemies, the Philistines > Palestine. When speaking of the land, from antiquity to today, the Jews themselves call it Eretz Yisrael, the Ashkenazi/Yiddish being Yisroel. There were two Talmuds, one written in Eretz Yisrael, and the later one written in Bavel (Babylonia).

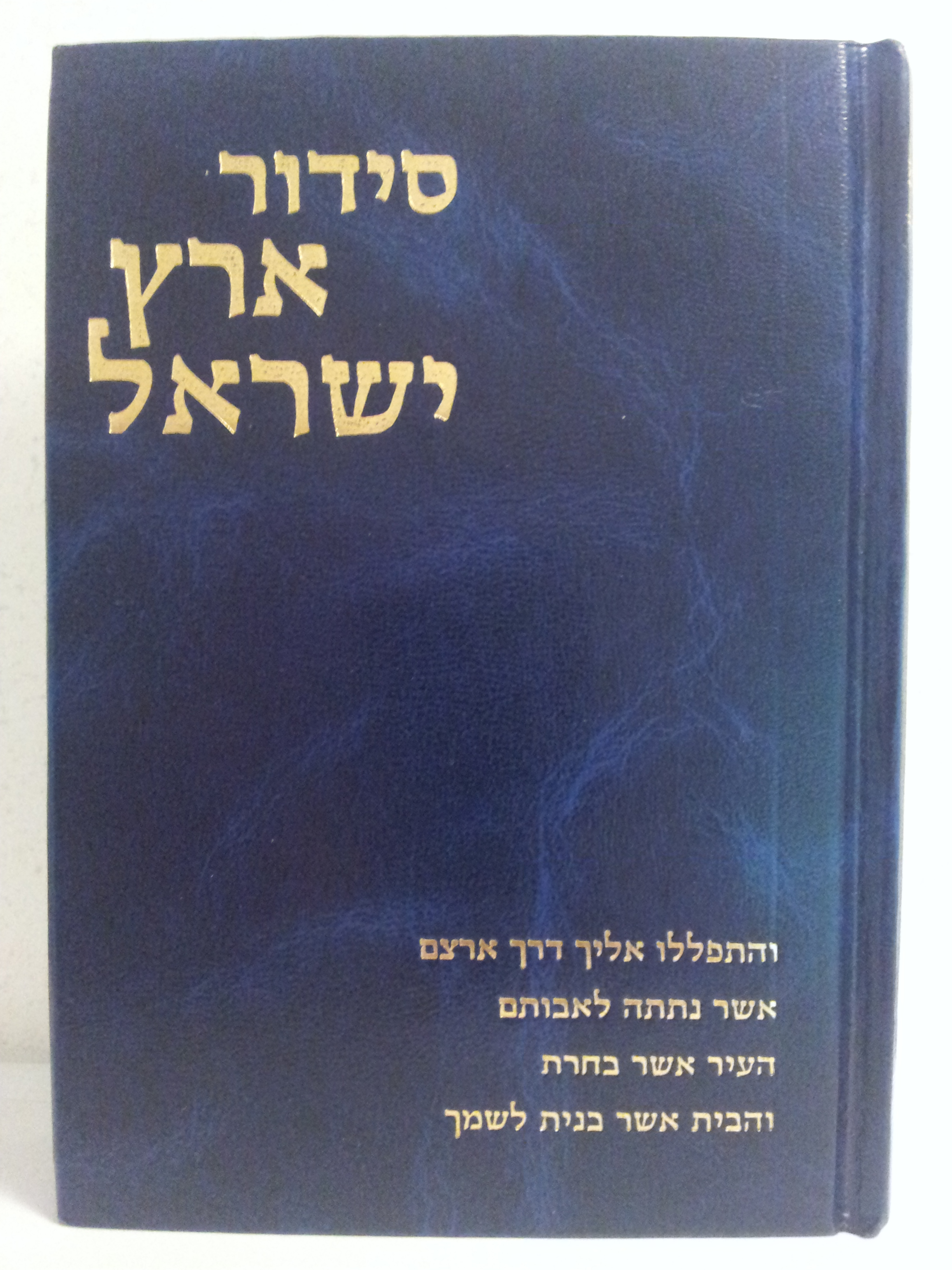
Prayer book called "Siddur Eretz Yisrael", based on the Minhagei Eretz Yisrael and the Jerusalem Talmud, published by Yair Shaki.

A complete collection has not been preserved from antiquity, but several passages of it are scattered in both the Babylonian and Jerusalem Talmuds, in the Midrashim, in the Pesiktot, in minor tractate Soferim, and in some responsa of the Yerushalmi Gaonate. Some excerpts have been preserved in the Siddur of Saadia Gaon and the Cairo Geniza yielded some important texts, such as the Amidah.

One fragment of an Eretz Yisrael siddur discovered in the genizah was written in Hebrew with various introductions and explanations in Judeo-Arabic dialects. The Geniza fragments mostly date from the 12th century, and reflect the usages of the Eretz Yisrael-rite synagogue in Cairo, which was founded by refugees from the Crusades.

Though the Jerusalem Talmud never became authoritative against the Babylonian, some elements of the Eretz Yisrael liturgy were destined to be accepted in Italy, Greece, Germany and France, even in Egypt, against the Babylonian, owing to the enthusiasm of the scholars of Rome. The Babylonian rite was accepted mainly in Spain, Portugal and the southern countries.

Liturgies incorporating some elements of the Eretz Yisrael minhag fall into three distinct groupings.

1. The German ritual, itself divided into two rituals, the western or Minhag Ashkenaz and the eastern, or Minhag Polin. Minhag Ashkenaz was introduced in Eretz Yisrael itself during the 16th century by German and Polish Kabbalists.
2. The Italian minhag, perhaps the oldest Yerushalmi-influenced ritual.
3. Lastly the Romaniot minhag, more accurately, the Rumelic or Greek ritual; this ritual of the Balkan countries has retained the most features of the Yerushalmi minhag.

It has been argued that Saadia Gaon's siddur reflects at least some features of the Yerushalmi minhag and that this was one source of the liturgy of German Jewry. Another historic liturgy containing Yerushalmi elements is the old Aleppo rite (published Venice, 1527 and 1560).

This traditional view, that the Sephardi rite was derived from that of Babylon while the Ashkenazi rite reflects that of Eretz Yisrael, goes back to Leopold Zunz, and was largely based on the fact that the Ashkenazi rite contains many piyyutim of Yerushalmi origin which are absent from the Babylonian and Sephardi rites. However, the correspondence is not complete. First, a few Sephardi usages in fact reflect Eretz Yisrael as against Babylonian influence, for example the use of the words morid ha-tal in the Amidah in summer months; and Moses Gaster maintained that the correspondence is the other way round (i.e. Ashkenazi=Babylonian, Sephardi=Yerushalmi. Secondly, Yerushalmi influence on any of the current Jewish rites extends only to isolated features, and none of them substantially follows the historic Eretz Yisrael rite.

- A comparative list of Babylonian and Eretz Yisrael customs, known as Hilluf Minhagim, is preserved from the time of the Geonim: most of the Eretz Yisrael customs there listed are not now practised in any community. The most important and long-lasting difference was that Torah reading in Eretz Yisrael-rite synagogues followed a triennial cycle, (which is different from the triennial cycle now used in Reform and in most Conservative congregations), while other communities used an annual cycle.
- Similarly, Eretz Yirsrael prayer texts recovered from the Cairo Geniza are not reflected in any current rite.
