= Minhag =

Accepted tradition or group of traditions in Judaism

A minhag (Hebrew: מִנְהָג, lit. 'custom'; pl. מִנְהָגִים, minhagim) is an accepted tradition or group of traditions in Judaism. A related concept, nusach (pronounced [ˈnusax]; נוּסָח, 'formula'), refers to the traditional ordering and forms of Jewish prayer.

== Etymology ==
The triliteral n-h-g (Hebrew: נ־ה־ג) means primarily "to drive" or, by extension, "to conduct [oneself]". The Hebrew word minhag appears twice in the Hebrew Bible—both times in the same verse of 2 Kings 9:20. In the RJPS version, it is translated as "driving" and "drives", respectively:

And the lookout reported, "The messenger has reached them, but has not turned back. And it looks like the driving of Jehu, son of Nimshi, who drives wildly."

Homiletically, one could argue that the use of the word minhag in Jewish law (הֲלָכָה, Halakha) reflects its Biblical Hebrew origins as "the [manner of] driving [a chariot]" (à la 2 Jehu in 2 Kings 9:20). Whereas Halakha translates roughly to "the way of walking", minhag lends itself to the styles that Jews developed vis-à-vis Halakha. Furthermore, derekh (דֶּרֶךְ), which translates roughly to "path", is the itinerary Jewish communities maintain while walking.

The present use of minhag for "custom" may have been influenced by the Arabic minhaj; in current Islamic usage, the term is used for the intellectual methodology of a scholar or school of thought rather than for the customs of a local or ethnic community.

== Minhag and Jewish law ==
In addition to the 613 commandments, Jews have traditionally considered Halakha—Jewish law as given in the Tanakh and exposited and recorded in the Mishnah, Talmud, responsa literature, and other codes—to be normative and binding upon all Jews. In addition to the major halakhic literature, there have always been informal customs and traditions. Some customs were at some points universally adopted (e.g., the wearing of a kippah) or almost universally (e.g., monogamy). Others were or are observed by some segments of Jewry but not by others (e.g., not eating kitniyot on Passover). Other customs are bound to certain localities or groups that originated in certain localities.

Minhagim exist in various forms:

- Ancient minhagim go back to the codification of the Talmud or earlier. Today, they are generally regarded as universally binding. The oldest recorded minhag is that of "beating the Aravot" (willow branches) on Hoshana Rabbah, which is believed to date back to the era of the Hebrew prophets.
- Many minhagim are followed by subgroups:
  - Jews whose ancestors continued to live in the Middle East and Africa until the establishment of the State of Israel, regardless of where they live now, tend to follow a variety of customs, such as Mizrahi, Sephardi, or Yemenite Jews. Jews whose ancestors lived in Central Europe in the Middle Ages (regardless of where they live now) tend to follow Ashkenazic customs, while those whose families originated in the Iberian Peninsula generally follow Sephardic customs. (The Talmud gives detailed rules for people who visit or move to a locale where the custom differs from their own.) Hasidic Jews tend to follow their own minhagim.
  - Within these broad categories there are also sub-groups by origin (e.g., Lithuanian, Polish, or German customs), by location (e.g., "minhag Yerushalayim") or by denominational affiliation (e.g., Skverrer Hasidic Jews follow different customs than Chabad-Lubavitch Jews).
  - Families and even individuals may adhere to minhagim not followed by others.

=== Discussion in rabbinic literature ===
Some sources in Rabbinic literature stress the importance of a long-held tradition, culminating in the statement "the minhag of our fathers is [equivalent to] Torah". Custom can thus determine Halachic practice in cases of disagreement among rabbinic authorities. In numerous instances, Rabbi Moses Isserles warns that one should not abolish long-held customs. (Isserles' gloss on the Shulchan Aruch was, in fact, written so as to delineate Ashkenazi minhagim alongside Sephardi practices in the same code of law.)

Despite the above, a minhag does not override clear biblical or Talmudic enactments, and one may not transgress the latter for the sake of the former. In fact, any minhag that intrinsically involves an element of Halacha violation is considered null and void.

The Talmud rules that a valid minhag accepted by previous generations of a family or community is binding upon all later generations. The Rosh states that the Talmud's ruling fundamentally applies to practices undertaken by learned individuals; innovations by the unlearned need only be followed publicly. Other Halachic authorities hold that the Talmud's ruling applies to all valid practices initiated by either learned or unlearned individuals.

In most cases, personal acceptance of a new minhag is tantamount to vowing performance of that minhag. Consequently, abandonment of such a minhag typically requires hatarat nedarim or sh'eilat chakham: Halachic procedures for absolving oneself from oaths. This was often necessary when, for example, an Ashkenazi Jew moved to the Ottoman Empire and wished to join the local Sephardi community.

=== Changing minhagim ===
Jewish law provides for a number of mechanisms to change or remove a custom when it is held to be mistaken or illogical. Orthodox rabbi and historian of Jewish law Menachem Elon writes:

Custom, because of its spontaneous and undirected nature, sometimes calls for a measure of supervision and control. At times a custom may be founded on error, or develop unreasonably or illogically in a certain direction, or may even be in conflict with substantive and fundamental principles of Jewish law in a manner leaving no room for its integration into the system. From time to time the halakhic scholars exercised such control in order to contain or discredit entirely a particular custom.

=== Present day ===
The acute displacement brought about by World War II and the Holocaust, and the large-scale immigration to the United States, various European countries, and especially the State of Israel, have led to a mixing of various minhagim and arguably the gradual disuse of certain customs. In addition, the baal teshuva movement has created a large group who have no clear tradition from their parents. In response to these phenomena, certain scholars have focused on the minhagim, and attempts have been made to revive minhagim that have fallen into disuse.

== Nusach ==
Nusach (properly nósach) primarily means "text" or "version"; the correct wording of a religious text. Thus, the nusach tefillah is the text of the prayers generally or as used by a particular community. In common use, nusach has come to signify the entire liturgical tradition of the community, including the musical rendition. It is narrower than minhag, which can refer to custom in any field and not necessarily that of communal prayer.

Both nusach and minhag can thus be used for liturgic rite or liturgic tradition; sometimes, a nusach appears to be a subdivision of a minhag or vice versa; see different Jewish rites and popular siddurim under Siddur. In general, one must pray according to one's "nusach of origin" unless one has formally joined a different community and accepted its minhag. (Perisha rules that if one abandons a nusach that has been accepted universally by the wider Jewish community, his prayer is disqualified and must be repeated using the accepted nusach: Arba'ah Turim, Orach Chayim, 120 ad loc).

The main segments of traditional Judaism, as differentiated by nusach (broadly and narrowly), are these:

- Nusach Ashkenaz: the general Ashkenazi rite of non-Chasidim can be subdivided into:
  - Minhag Ashkenaz (German rite)
  - Minhag Polin/Lita (Polish/Lithuanian/Prague rite)
- Nusach Sefard or Nusach Ari (Ashkenazi Chasidic rite, heavily influenced by the teachings of Sephardi Kabbalists)
- Minhag Sefaradi: in general refers to the various Sephardi liturgies, but also to obligation/permissibility of Kabbalistic elements within the rite. Versions of this are:
  - The Spanish and Portuguese Jewish Rite
  - Nusach Morocco (Moroccan rite: there are differences between the Spanish-Moroccan and the Arab-Moroccan customs)
  - Nusach HaChida (The Chida's rite, named after Rabbi Chaim Joseph David Azulai: often used by North African Jews)
  - Nusach Livorno (Sephardic rite from nineteenth-century editions printed in Italy and often used by North African Jews)
- Minhag Edot HaMizrach: often used to mean the Baghdadi rite, is more or less influenced by the Sephardi minhag
- Nosach Teiman, can be subdivided into:
  - Nosach Baladi, closely resembling the original Yemenite rite, but with later additions
    - The form used by Dor Daim, who attempt to safeguard the oldest Baladi tradition of Yemenite Jewish observance, is the version originally used by all Yemenite Jews near the time of Maimonides.
  - Nosach Shami, adopted from Sephardic siddurim. Rabbi Shalom ben Aharon HaKohen Iraqi would go to a different synagogue each Shabbath with printed Sephardic siddurim, requesting that they pray in the Sephardic rite and forcing it upon them if necessary
- Nusach Eretz Yisrael; has not survived in any community, though an attempt to revive it has been made by Rabbi David Bar-Hayim of Machon Shilo; however, it is thought to have had some influence on:
  - Nusach Ashkenaz
  - Minhag Italiani and Minhag Benè Romì, see Italian Jews
  - Minhag Romania, the rite of the Romaniotes, that is, the original Greek Jewish community as distinct from the Sephardim

== See also ==
- Metuentes

== External links and resources ==
References

- Custom, jewishencyclopedia.com
- A Historical Map of Jewish Liturgical Influence and Variation
- The Rules of Halacha, Rabbi Aryeh Kaplan
- Customs (Minhagim), nishmat.net

Resources

- Rabbinic literature
  - Sages of Ashkenaz Database - Online collection of minhag seforim
  - Minhagei Maharil, Rabbi Yaakov ben Moshe Levi Moelin (Maharil), 1556.
  - "Sefer HaMinhagim" (Hebrew Fulltext, PDF) Rabbi Isaac Tyrnau, 1566.
  - "Ta'amei HaMinhagim", Rabbi A. I. Sperling, 1896; translation: "Reasons for Jewish customs and traditions". Bloch Pub. Co 1968. ISBN 0-8197-0184-X
  - "Likutei Maharich". Rabbi Yisroel Chaim Freedman of Rachov.
  - "Sefer HaMinhagim", Rabbis M. Greenglass and Y. Groner, 1966; translation: “The Book of Chabad-Lubavitch Customs”. Sichos In English Pub. 1998. ISBN 0-8266-0555-9
  - "Otzar Ta'amei ha-Minhagim", Rabbi Shmuel Gelbard, 1995; translation: "Rite and Reason" Feldheim Pub. 1997 ISBN 0-87306-889-0
- General
  - "The Biblical and Historical Background of Jewish Customs and Ceremonies", Rabbi Abraham Bloch. Ktav 1980. ISBN 0-87068-658-5
  - "The Minhagim: The Customs and Ceremonies of Judaism, Their Origins and Rationale", Rabbi Abraham Chill. Sepher Hermon 1978. ISBN 0-87203-077-6
  - "To Be a Jew: A Guide to Jewish Observance in Contemporary Life", Rabbi Hayim Donin. Basic Books 1991. ISBN 0-465-08632-2
  - "Jewish Book of Why", Rabbi Alfred J. Kolatch. Jonathan David 1995. ISBN 0-8246-0314-1
  - "Minhagei Yisrael: Origins and History", Rabbi Daniel Sperber. Mossad Harav Kook, 1998.
  - "The Complete Book of Jewish Observance", Rabbi Leo Trepp. Behrman House Publishing 1980. ISBN 0-671-41797-5
  - "Jewish Spiritual Practices", Yitzhak Buxbaum. Jason Aronson Inc. 1994. ISBN 0-87668-832-6 (hardcover) ISBN 1-56821-206-2 (paperback)
