= Hakham =

Wise man or rabbi in Judaism

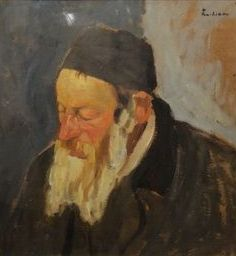
The Hakham of Moinești (Hahamul din Moineşti), Ștefan Luchian, 1909

Hakham (or Chakam(i), Haham(i), Hacham(i), Hach; Hebrew: חכם, romanized: ḥāḵām, lit. 'Wise') is a term in Judaism meaning a wise or skillful man; it often refers to someone who is a great Torah scholar. It can also refer to any cultured and learned person: "He who says a wise thing is called a Hakham, even if he be not a Jew." Hence, in Talmudic-Midrashic literature, wise gentiles are commonly called hakhmei ummot ha-'olam ("wise men of the nations of the world"). In Sephardic usage, hakham is a synonym for "rabbi".

== In ancient times ==
Hakham as an official title is found as early as the first Sanhedrin, after the reconstruction of that body, when the Hadrianic religious persecutions had ceased. In addition to the nasi Simeon ben Gamliel, two other scholars stood at the head of the Sanhedrin, namely Nathan the Babylonian as Av Beit Din and Rabbi Meir as hakham. Another hakham mentioned by name was Simon, the son of Judah ha-Nasi, who after the death of his father officiated as hakham, with his elder brother the nasi. The exact functions of the hakham are not clear. Rapoport's suggestion that he was the arbiter in matters of ritual prohibition and permission is highly improbable. Zecharias Frankel looks upon the hakham as a presiding officer whose duty it was to examine a case in question from all points of view, and, having summed up the results, to present the matter for discussion. It is more probable, however, that the office of hakham was created in order to secure a majority in cases of difference of opinion between the nasi and the Av Beit Din in the affairs of the Sanhedrin; one of the most eminent scholars was always chosen for the post. A baraita in Moed Kattan 22b leads to the inference that the hakham was always the director of a school (bet midrash), for in addition to the Great Sanhedrin, which later came to take the place of an academy, there were also private academies under the direction of eminent scholars. The origin of the office of hakham is as doubtful as its duration.

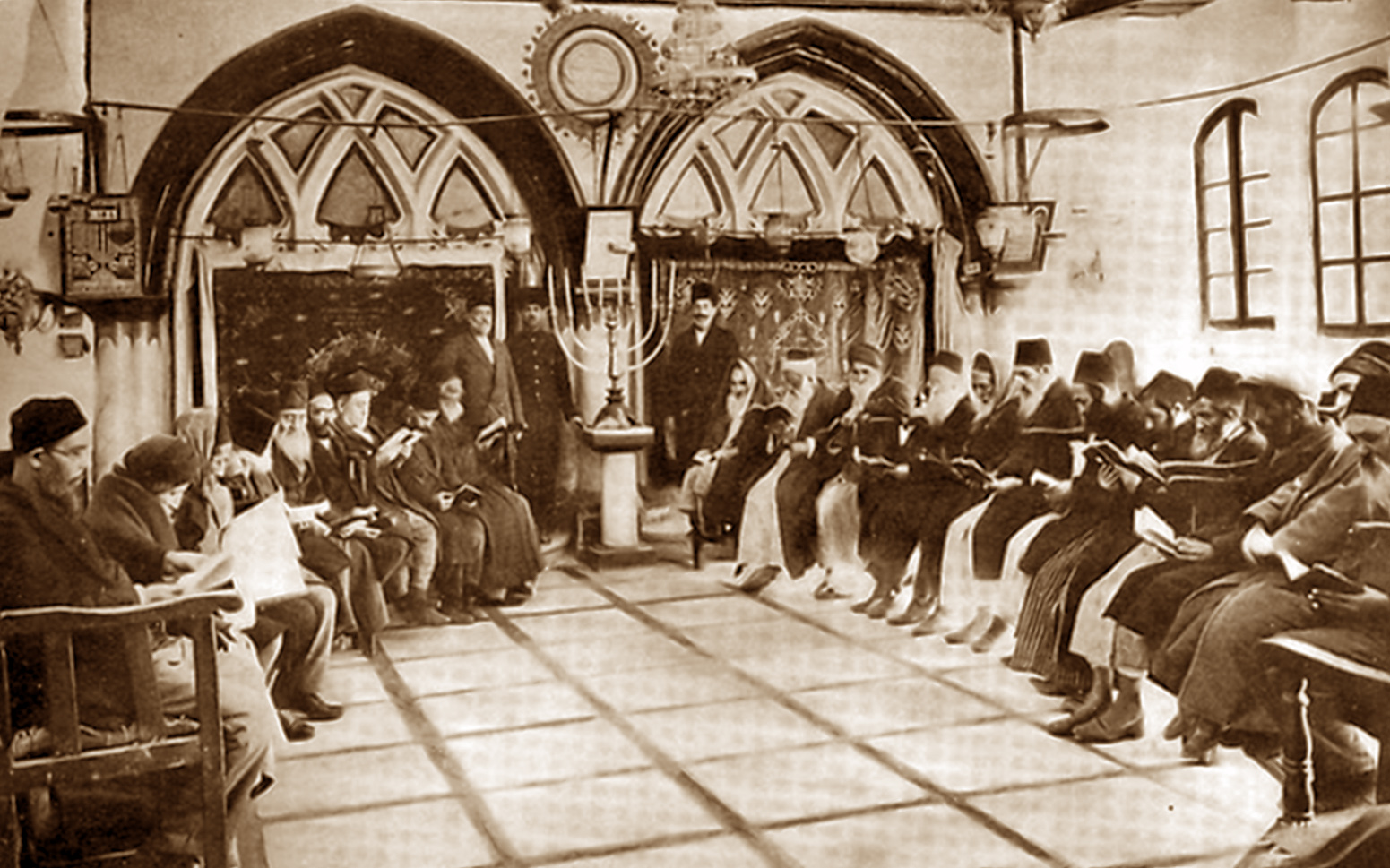
Photo taken in 1893: installation of the Hakham Bachi of Jerusalem at the Yohanan Ben-Zakai synagogue.

In the Hebrew Bible, the "wise man" was mostly depicted as a practical figure in varied contexts. In Isaiah 40:20 a "wise craftsman" (haras hakam) builds an idol. Similarly, the leb-hakam or "skilled craftsmen" of Exodus 35 make the Tabernacle, it's lamps and oil, the anointing oil, the altar of burnt offering and its bronze gate, its utensils (all of them), and the woven vestments of Aaron and his sons. Frankel thinks that Joshua ben Hananiah (early 2nd century) was the first hakham. He does not sufficiently support this assertion. The office seems to have existed in Palestine as long as the academy of the nasi. An amora of the fourth century recounts the following rule of etiquette, still observed in his time: "When the hakham appears in the academy everyone present must rise as soon as he comes within four ells of him, and must remain standing until he has gone four ells beyond". It is hardly possible that the office of hakham existed in Talmudic academies in Babylonia (Lower Mesopotamia). where the relation of the exilarch to the heads of the academy was entirely different from that existing in Talmudic academies in Syria Palaestina between the latter and the nasi. Here, hakham was merely the term for a Jewish scholar who studied chiefly oral traditions. The terms sofer "scribe" and qārāʾ "reciter, reader" were applied to Bible scholars. In the Seder Olam Zutta, every exilarch is accompanied by a hakham, who probably had charge of the religious affairs of the exilarchate; but as this work originated in Palestine, the author probably applied Palestinian conditions to Babylon. The Syrian Aphrahat, who had met only Babylonian Jews, mentions a man "who is called the 'hakkima' of the Jews", but this too may mean "the wise man" of the Jews. The plural, hakhamim, is generally used in the Talmud, and also by the Tannaim, to designate the majority of scholars as against a single authority. The Aramean equivalent is "rabbanan."

== Among the Sephardim ==
Among Sephardic Jews, particularly Spanish and Portuguese Jews, hakham is the official title of the local rabbi, but it is not known how old the title is. Shlomo ibn Aderet addresses some of his responsa to people with lehakham Rabbi..., others again with "larab Rabbi...", but it is possible that lehakham simply means "to the wise."

The surname Hacham is found among both Sephardic and Ashkenazic Jews, including variations such as Hach, Hachami, Hachamovich, Hachamson.

== In Muslim countries ==
In the Muslim world, a rabbi was often called a ḥākhām because al-Rab is one of the names of God in Islam and may have caused offense due to misunderstanding. Thus the Chief Rabbi of the Ottoman Empire was called the Hakham Bashi (Hahambaşı حاخامباشی). Although the word ḥākhām is derived from the common Semitic root Ḥ-K-M, the second consonant is generally spelled with a ḫāʾ ⟨خ⟩ in Arabic and in languages that use Arabic alphabet to reflect the Hebrew pronunciation: حاخام. The term is cognate to the Arabic words حاكم ḥākim (ruler/lord) and حكيم ḥakīm (wise man).

== Karaite Judaism ==
In Karaite Judaism, spiritual leaders are called hakham to distinguish them from their Rabbinic (i.e. non-Karaite) counterparts. Since Karaite theology is based on the use of reason by individuals to determine the applications of the Hebrew Bible's laws for themselves, the role of a hakham is more "advisory" than that of a rabbi in mainstream Rabbinic Judaism.

== See also ==
- Talmid Chakham
