= Weekly maqam =

In Mizrahi and Sephardic Middle Eastern Jewish prayer services, each Shabbat the congregation conducts services using a different maqam. A maqam (مقام), which in Arabic literally means 'ascent', is a standard melody type and set of related tunes. The melodies used in a given maqam aims effectively to express the emotional state of the reader throughout the set liturgy (without changing the text). This article primarily describes the musical practices of Syrian Jews, though the musical traditions of other Mizrahi Jews communities are also based on the maqam system. Ashkenazi nusach includes a simplified system including three main modes or steyger and several minor variants. Muslims share the same practice of conducting services using the maqam, but differ substantially in many ways.

== Application of the maqam system ==
The maqam that is used each Shabbat depends on the theme, story, or main message of the Sabbath weekly Torah portion. The cantor, or hazzan, of the congregation leads the worshippers with the melodies of the particular maqam, which is preset and standardized on an official list.

Widely different lists of maqam are found in different communities, e.g. the Aleppo list does not always agree with the Damascus and Beirut lists, and the Egyptian and Yerushalmi (Jerusalem Sephardic) lists are different again. Even within the Aleppo tradition there is not total agreement among the written sources, though the underlying pattern of the lists is usually the same. Other determinants of the maqam include whether or not there is a holiday approaching in the upcoming week: when this is the case, or there are two Torah portions for the week, the hazzan has some discretion which maqam to use. As a general rule, the same maqam will never be used two weeks in a row. Also, the list tries to rotate the maqamot in such a fashion that the ten maqams are spread out almost equally in time as to avoid the redundancy of hearing the same maqam within a short period of time.

Most of the prayers in the Shabbat morning service are rendered in a prose recitative, the exact tune of which varies with the maqam of the week. However, certain important passages, such as Nishmat and Kaddish, are sung to the tunes of specific Pizmonim, which are chosen according to a rota so as to fit the maqam of the week.

The cantillation of the Torah does not follow the maqam of the week, but is almost invariably performed in maqam Sigah. Similarly the Friday night service is usually in maqam Nawa or Nahawand.

== Thematic patterns ==
There are a few patterns that determine which maqam will be used on a given week. There are some very obvious patterns and some not so obvious ones (which are disputed as a result).

=== Maqam Rast ===
Maqam Rast is used to mark the beginning of something new, such as the beginning of reading a new book of Torah (raʾs, in Arabic, means 'head'). For the first parasha of each book of the Torah (the Books of Genesis, Exodus, Leviticus, Numbers, and theoretically, but see under Hijaz, Deuteronomy, this maqam is applied. Another application of Rast is for the afternoon services on Shabbat, when Jews read the new parashah of the upcoming week, thus beginning a new week.

=== Maqam Mahour ===
Maqam Mahour, which is related to Maqam Rast, is applied when someone is angry and feels emotional instability. The only two parashiyyot to have this maqam applied are Toledot and Balak when the main characters, Esau and Balak, respectively, are angered. This maqam is used in other instances according to the manuscripts of Hakham Moshe Ashear and Cantor Gabriel A. Shrem.

=== Maqam Ajam ===
Maqam Ajam, named after the Arabic word for 'Iranian', is used to mark happy occasions such as holidays, weddings, and other joyous occasions. This maqam is used for Beshalach (Shabbat Shirah), Vayetze and Shofetim due to the happy occasions mentioned in those parashiyyot. Ajam is also used on the second days of the Three Pilgrimage Festivals. Ajam resembles a Western major scale, and is sometimes looked down upon as facile and obvious, in much the same way that the Ionian or major mode was described as modus lascivus and not favoured in medieval church music.

=== Maqam Nahwand ===
Maqam Nahwand, named after Nahāwand/Nahāvand, a city in Iranian Hamadan province, is applied when there is disharmony between parties and fights, in general. A related maqam is Rahawi Nawa (see below), but this has sunk in popularity and therefore most cantors almost always replace Rahawi Nawa with Maqam Nahwand, due to the surplus and variety of more Western-oriented songs in Nahwand, which closely resembles the western minor scale. Until the 20th century, this maqam was never used for the purpose of prayers by either Jews or Muslims. (Similarly in the Middle Ages, the minor or Aeolian mode, though acknowledged to exist, was never used in Gregorian chant.)

=== Maqam Bayat ===
Maqam Bayat is a somber or dull-sounding maqam and does not necessarily imply a given theme. It is commonly recited in a low pitch to express darkness. As a general rule, this maqam is applied to all Bar Mitzvahs and to Saturday Night services, due to the abundance of related pizmonim in those maqams. Some say that Bayat symbolizes an oath between two parties (as is the case with Bar Mitzvah – an oath between man and God).

Maqam Bayat's dark sound most likely comes from its half-flat second degree.

=== Maqam Hoseni ===
Maqam Hoseni, which is closely related to Maqam Bayat in sound, is used to express the beauty of something. For example, when the Ten Commandments are given, in Parashat Yitro and Va'ethanan, this maqam is applied to show its beauty. The same is the case to show the erection of the Tabernacle, in parashat Terumah, Vayaqhel, and Shemini. This maqam is used on the Shabbat preceding Shavuot, when the Torah is given to Israel (though not on Shavuot itself).

=== Maqam Rahawi Nawa ===
Maqam Rahawi Nawa is applied at the end of most books. Among many things, it symbolizes the end of something. This maqam is applied every Friday night during the Kabbalat Shabbat services. At the present, this maqam is rarely used for Shabbat morning services, as it is usually replaced by maqam Nahwand. Strictly speaking, Rahawi and Nawa are two separate maqamat: Rahawi is used in the Passover Haggadah (Seder), while Nawa is used for reciting the Mishnah (hence its use for Friday night, as this service contains a long excerpt from the Mishnah known as Bammeh madliqin.).

=== Maqam Sabah ===
Maqam Sabah, literally in Arabic 'sadness and utopia', and in Hebrew 'army', is used to mark the berit or circumcision, is performed on all male babies and therefore when there is a birth of a baby boy in the parasha (Lech-Lecha or Tazria), this maqam is applied. Not only would berit milah require this maqam, but also any reference to the word berit or a strong reference to the number eight, which symbolizes covenant. Since the idea of berit relates to the observance of mitzvot, wherever there is a parasha where there is a multitude of mitzvot, this maqam is applied (Mishpatim, Qedoshim, or Behar). Other uses of Sabah include any parasha that mentions the army (Masei, Ki Tetse), since the word saba in Hebrew means 'army'. Kligman notes that the Jewish association of Sabah with the themes mentioned above differs drastically from the rest of the Arab world, who associate Sabah with sadness.

=== Maqam Sigah ===
Maqam Sigah, or Sikah, from the Persian for 'third place', is applied when there are special readings in the parasha. It is also applied on holidays. This maqam is linked to the holiday of Purim due to the abundance of pizmonim related to the holiday in this maqam (no doubt because the maqam is of Persian origin, and the events of the book of Esther take place in Persia). This maqam is also of importance because it is the maqam that is used for the cantillation of the Torah. For Parashas Bo, Beha'alotecha, and Eqeb, parashas that are the "third" in their respective books, maqam Sigah, which means 'third [place]', is used.

=== Maqam Hijaz ===
Maqam Hijaz, which is named after a Hijaz region in Arabia, is used to mark solemn occasions. When there is a death in the parasha (Sarah and Abraham in Chayei Sarah, Jacob and Joseph in Vayechi, or Nadab and Abihu in Acharei Mot), or a tragic episode (Golden Calf in Ki Tissa, Sin of the Spies in Shelach Lecha and the Temple's Destruction in the week of Devarim), then this maqam is applied. At funerals, this maqam is usually applied. As it corresponds to the Ashkenazi ahavah rabbah steiger, synagogues in Israel sometimes use it when there are Ashkenazi guests.

== See also ==
- Ades Synagogue
- Arabic maqam
- Baqashot
- Jewish prayer modes
- Pizmonim
- Sephardic Judaism
- Sephardic Pizmonim Project
- Shabbat
- Syrian Cantors
- Syrian Jews
- Weekly Torah portion
