= Syrian Cantors =

Syrian Jewish prayer leader

The Syrian Cantor is the hazzan who leads the traditional prayer rituals in the synagogues of the Syrian Jews. He conducts the services using ten maqamat or musical modes. A cantor must be fully cognizant of these maqamat and their applications to the prayers. A different maqam is used each week, depending on the week's Torah portion.

== Maqamat ==
The maqam system is characteristic of, and can be used to classify, all Arabic music.

The term maqam has various shades of meaning. On the most basic level, a maqam is a musical scale. A few of these consist of steps of a whole tone and half a tone in the same way as the Western diatonic scale. Others also admit steps of one and a half tones, like the Western harmonic minor and the steiger of Ashkenazic cantorial practice. The majority include one or more three-quarter tone steps, this being the distinguishing characteristic of Arabic and other Middle Eastern music.

In addition to the scale used, each maqam has different conventions governing which note of the scale predominates, which note a melody must end on and the characteristic melodic turns of phrase; thus there can be two or more maqamat using the same basic scale. Each maqam has a different flavor or mood, which is meant to provoke certain moods, thoughts, and emotions. Due to that fact and the myriad of possible combinations, there are over one hundred maqamat, each named after its supposed city or region of origin in the Middle East. (This may be compared with the geographical terms such as "Dorian" and "Phrygian" used for the modes in ancient Greek music.) Approximately ten of these maqamat are in widespread use in the Syrian Jewish community.

In yet another meaning, maqam can be used for an improvised instrumental cadenza using a given musical mode (the vocal equivalent is called a mawwal, and is used for the petiħot interspersing the baqashot service).

== Maqam of the week ==
Each week in the Hebrew calendar is associated with a particular maqam, usually governed by the Torah portion for that week. There are also maqamat associated with the Jewish festivals.

Certain maqamat are associated with certain themes. Therefore, the cantor must be aware of the themes in the weekly Torah portion in order to apply the proper maqam on that Shabbat. The choice of maqam for a given Shabbat is determined by the subject matter of the Torah portion and is set forth in an index of the pizmonim book. Numerous lists have been compiled over the last one hundred and fifty years designating the maqam for each parasha. Occasionally the lists conflict with each other (for example, when two portions are read on the same Sabbath), but most of the time the underlying pattern is evident.

=== Application of the weekly maqam ===
In a Shabbat or festival service, the maqam is relevant for three purposes:

1. The main body of the prayers is rendered in a recitative, which differs according to the applicable maqam.
2. Certain prayers, such as Kaddish, Nishmat and the Kedushah, are more elaborate, and borrow their tune from hymns ("pizmonim") used in the community. The hymn used is chosen so as to fit the applicable maqam, and there is an elaborate table set out at the back of the community's hymn books, showing which tune should be used for which prayer on which occasion.
3. Additionally pizmonim conforming to the "maqam of the week" will be interpolated at points of the ritual. These include both traditional hymns and newer compositions, in which the Hebrew words were written to fit an existing Arabic melody.

=== Exceptions to the use of the weekly maqam ===
Regardless of the maqam for the week or festival:

- the zemirot (psalms at the beginning of the service) are generally in maqam Sigah;
- the cantillation of the Shabbat Torah portion is always performed in maqam Sigah;
- the Friday night service is recited in maqam Nahawend or Nawa;
- the Saturday afternoon service is recited in maqam rast;
- the Saturday night service is recited in maqam Bayat;
- the service on the occasion of a circumcision is recited in maqam Saba.

Weekday services also are not recited according to the maqam of the week.

== Notable cantors ==
The following were or are well-known cantors in the Syrian Jewish communities of Israel and the United States.

- Chaim Shaul Abud

== Bibliography ==
=== Pizmonim books ===
- Abud, Chaim Shaul, Sefer Shire Zimrah, Jerusalem, 1936.
- Abud, Chaim Shaul, Sefer Shire Zimrah Hashalem im Sefer le-Baqashot le-Shabbat, Jerusalem, 1953, repr. 1988.
- Antebi Tabbush, Refael Yiṣḥaq, Shirah Ḥadashah, Aleppo, 1888.
- Ashear, Moshe, Hallel Vezimrah, Jerusalem, 1928.
- Cohen, Refael Ḥayim ("Parsi"), Shir Ushbaḥah, Jerusalem, 1905 and 1921.
- Shrem, Gabriel, Shir Ushbaḥah Hallel Vezimrah, Sephardic Heritage Foundation, New York, 1983.
- Sefer Shirah Ḥadashah Hashalem (second edition), Zimrat Ha'Aretz Institute, New York, 2002.
- Shir Ushbaḥah, Machon Haketab, Jerusalem, 2005.
- Sefer Pizmonim Hameforash - Od Yosef Ḥai, 2006/7.

=== Secondary literature ===
- Kligman, Mark (2009). Maqam and Liturgy: Ritual, Music and Aesthetics of Syrian Jews in Brooklyn. Detroit: Wayne State University Press. ISBN 978-0-8143-3216-0.
