= Pizmonim =

Jewish songs with Arabic melodies

Pizmonim (Hebrew פזמונים, singular pizmon) are traditional Jewish songs and melodies sung with the intention of praising God as well as learning certain aspects of traditional religious teachings. They are sung throughout religious rituals and festivities such as prayers, circumcisions, bar mitzvahs, weddings and other ceremonies.

Pizmonim are extra-liturgical, as distinct from piyyutim, which are hymns printed in the prayer-book and forming an integral part of the service. Similar songs sung in the synagogue on the Sabbath morning between midnight and dawn are called baqashot (שירת הבקשות).

== Geographical background ==
Pizmonim are traditionally associated with Sephardi Jews, although they are related to Ashkenazi Jews' zemirot. The best known tradition is associated with Jews descended from Aleppo, though similar traditions exist among Iraqi Jews (where the songs are known as shbaḥoth, praises) and in North African countries. Jews of Greek, Turkish and Balkan origin have songs of the same kind in Ladino, associated with the festivals: these are known as coplas.

== History of texts ==
The texts of many pizmonim date back to before the Middle Ages, while others were composed by poets such as Yehuda Halevi and Israel Najara of Gaza after the Spanish Inquisition. Some melodies are quite old, while others may be based on popular Middle Eastern music, with the words composed specially to fit the tune. A prolific composer of pizmonim of this last kind was Hakham Rephael Antebi Tabbush (Aleppo 1830-Cairo 1918), who is regarded as the founder of the tradition in its present form. The tradition has since been exported to Syrian Jewish communities in the Americas by his pupils, principally Hakham Moses Ashear in New York. Pizmonim are composed for special occasions such as weddings and bar mitzvahs by Cantors in the past, as well as the present, by Ezekiel Hai Albeg, H Ezra Mishaniye, Rabbi Raphael Yair Elnadav, and others. Most pizmonim are in Hebrew, though a few are in Judaeo-Aramaic or Judaeo-Arabic.

== Maqamat (maqams) ==
All pizmonim can be classified under different maqams (musical modes), of which there are about ten in common use. Maqam ajam, which sounds a little like a Western major scale, is the thematic maqam that contains many holiday melodies. Maqam hijaz, which corresponds to the Phrygian dominant scale, is the thematic maqam that contains many sad melodies. Maqam sikah (or sigah), containing many three-quarter-tone intervals, is used for the cantillation of the Torah. Maqam saba is the maqam used for circumcisions.

== Origins of tradition ==
The origin of the tradition could potentially be explained in the context of certain rulings of the Geonim discouraging the use of piyyutim in core parts of the prayer service. These rulings were taken seriously by the Kabbalistic school of Isaac Luria, and from the sixteenth century on many hymns were eliminated from the service. As the community did not wish to lose these much-loved hymns, the custom grew up of singing them extra-liturgically. Thus, the original core of the pizmonim collection consists of hymns from the old Aleppo ritual (published in Venice in 1560) and hymns from the Sephardic service by Yehuda Halevi, Solomon ibn Gabirol and others. A few hymns were also taken from the liturgy of the Romaniotes.

Further pizmonim were composed and added to the collection through the centuries. This practice may have arisen out of a Jewish prohibition of singing songs of the non-Jews (due to the secular character and lyrics of the songs). This was true in the case of Arabic songs, whereby Jews were allowed to listen to the songs, but not allowed to sing them with the text. In order to bypass the problem, many composers, throughout the centuries, wrote new lyrics to the songs with the existing melodies, in order not to violate the tradition of not singing non-Jewish songs.

== Liturgical and non-liturgical use ==
During typical Shabbat and holiday services in the Syrian tradition, the melodies of pizmonim are used as settings for some of the prayers, in a system of rotation to ensure that the maqam suits the mood of the holiday or the Torah reading. Each week there is a different maqam assigned to the cantor according to the theme of the given Torah portion of the week. A pizmon may also be sung in honour of a person called up to the Torah, immediately before or after the reading: usually this is chosen so as to contain some allusion to the person's name or family.

Pizmonim, or any melodies, are generally not applied throughout the week during prayer services.

Another occasion for their use is at the gatherings some individuals would hold in their homes on Shabbat afternoons. A gathering of this kind may take the form of an extended kiddush, and is known as a sebbet (from the Syrian Arabic for "Saturday").

== The Red book ==
In 1959, the Syrian community of Brooklyn, New York, acted on the need of compiling their own pizmonim book based on their ancient traditions from Aleppo. Prior to this, there were many older pizmonim books circulating around the community, but they didn't have Hebrew vowels, and were generally difficult for the masses to utilize.

The book, which was published by the Sephardic Heritage Foundation, was started in 1949 by Gabriel Shrem and was completed in 1964. It aimed to include the ancient (Baqashot and Petihot), the old (Israel Najara, Mordechai Abadi, Raphael Tabbush, Moshe Ashear), and the new material (Raphael Yair Elnadav, Ezra Dweck, Gabriel A Shrem, Ezekiel Hai Albeg, Abraham Cohen Saban, Ezra Mishaniye, and other modern Israeli melodies). The book also has innovative features very useful for a cantor, such as a list of maqams to go with the specific perasha, as well as which pieces of Sabbath prayers fit with the melodies of certain pizmonim. In later editions, more songs were added to the book in their appropriate sections.

The classic red pizmonim book mentioned above serves Syrian Jews of Brooklyn as their official canon of pizmonim.

The book is currently in its ninth edition.

== Sephardic Pizmonim Project ==
The Sephardic Pizmonim Project, is a website dedicated to the scholarship, restoration and preservation of the ancient music of the Sephardic-Syrian Jewish community. The project, founded by David Matouk Betesh, is dedicated to the memory of his great-grandfather, cantor Gabriel A Shrem, a former instructor at Yeshiva University's Cantorial Institute (Philip and Sarah Belz School of Jewish Music), cantor of B'nai Yosef Synagogue and editor-in-chief of the "Shir uShbaha Hallel veZimrah" pizmonim book. The website is also dedicated in honor of cantor Isaac J. Cabasso of Congregation Beth Torah in Brooklyn, New York.

Preludes to the project began in the late 1970s when Shrem started teaching a course at Yeshiva University. As a demonstration tool, Shrem recorded the bulk of the pizmonim for classroom distribution. The collection resulting from these recordings encompassed roughly 65% of the Sephardic pizmonim liturgy. Since 2004 and over the course of about seven years, Isaac J. Cabasso, on behalf of the Sephardic Pizmonim Project, has provided approximately 200 more recordings of pizmonim not recorded by Shrem.

The Sephardic Pizmonim Project organisation re-released all of Shrem's recordings on a large CD collection in September 2004 selling approximately 7,000 CDs. The organisation launched a website in 2006 with the goal of "preserving all [Middle Eastern Jewish] liturgical traditions". In the process, cantors throughout the world have contacted the organisation to provide recordings to further enhance the project. The project's website (www.pizmonim.com) contains recordings of the Biblical taamim and the baqashot, together with pizmonim not included in the CD collection. In January 2012, the website, under web designer Sam Franco, received a major facelift to advance the organization into the next decade.

In 2020, the project announced that it had reached the benchmark of only missing 65 melodies of pizmonim from the 'Shir Ushbaha Hallel VeZimrah' pizmonim book. When the project first began, they were missing over 300 pizmonim. The last 65 pizmonim that are still missing will be more difficult to obtain due to the aging population and the general difficulty of those specific pizmonim. In addition to preserving "Red Book" pizmonim, the project also attempts to preserve pizmonim from "Old Shir Ushbaha" (Cohen, 1905, 1921) as well as melodies whose names appear in the weekly Hazzanut notes of H Moses Ashear (1877–1940).

== Popular Pizmonim ==
There are certain Pizmonim that are significantly more well known than others due primarily to common usage.

The song "My Fortress," (Heb: מעזי), likely composed by Hakham Raphael Antebi Tabbush, is one of the most well-known songs and is often sung during the Three Pilgrimage Festivals. Despite its usage at a happy time, the song expresses a yearning for redemption highlighting the pain and suffering undergone by Diaspora Jews. It is the reference in the song's ultimate verse to the rejoicing "3 times a year" causes it to maintain popularity during the Three Pilgrimage Festivals. The melody of the song stems from the Arabic song "Baladi Askara Min Araf il Lama." The final verse of the song is often repeated by multiple singers with added flair placed on the words "al damam" (on my blood), as seen in Hazzan Moshe Dweck's recording.

Another popular song, In The Assembly of The Nation God is Blessed, (Heb: מקהלות עם ברכו אל) is commonly sung celebrating an upcoming wedding. Attributed to Hakham Mordekhai Abadi, it is often sung preceding the Aliyah of the father of the bridegroom on the Sabbath before the wedding. In Maqam Ajam, this song is marked by a celebratory melody and its captivating melody makes it an especially popular song for young children to learn. The song contains four verses each followed by the chorus: "Praise Him exalt Him bless Him loyally; In honor of the bridegroom chosen of his nation, Jacob an honest man." (the reference to Jacob is either taken to be using Jacob to represent the Jewish Nation, or indicating that the song was written for a specific bridegroom named Jacob). The song progresses by praising God for his generosity in bringing about the upcoming union, and blessing the bridegroom for his upcoming marriage. The sing ends, similar to many pizmonim, by remembering the Exodus from Egypt and praying for the redemption of the Jewish Nation. Recording by Hazzan Moshe Dweck

== See also ==
- Baqashot
- Bayati
- Makam
- Maqam
- Syrian Jews
- Syrian Cantors
- The Weekly Maqam
- Sephardic Judaism
- Central Synagogue of Aleppo
- Ades Synagogue
- Ahot Ketannah
