= Isaac Saba Raffoul =

Mexican businessman of Syrian Jewish descent (1923–2008)

- Born: October 17, 1923
- Died: July 27, 2008 (aged 84)
- Occupation: Businessman
- Spouse: Rebecca
- Children: 3

Isaac Saba Raffoul (October 17, 1923 – July 27, 2008) was a Mexican businessman of Syrian Jewish descent; his father emigrated from Aleppo, Syria to Veracruz, Mexico where he started a rag business which the family built on. Isaac Saba Raffoul was one of the wealthiest persons in the world according to Forbes magazine, with a net worth of $2.1 billion. He had been married to wife Rebecca for over 40 years and had three sons: Moises, Manuel and Alberto.

He was the president of Grupo Xtra and chairman of Casa Saba. There has been a controversy surrounding him since he teamed up with General Electric Mexico to open up a new nationwide television channel. TV Azteca and Televisa, upon hearing this, accused him of monopolizing medicine prices in an attempt to discredit him. According to El Financiero, there is no such monopoly. After his death in 2008, his two youngest sons Alberto and Manuel inherited the ownership of the company.

== See also ==
- List of billionaires (2005)
- List of Mexican billionaires
