= Achot Ketannah =

Achot Ketana - Sephardim - Portuguese version, Amsterdam, Performer: Abraham Lopes Cardozo, Recorded in the 1950s

Achot Ketannah (Hebrew: אחות קטנה, lit. 'Little Sister') is a pizmon of nine stanzas sung in the Sephardic and Hasidic ritual before the commencement of the Rosh Hashanah evening prayer.

The refrain runs "May the year end with her woes!" and is changed in the last stanza to "May the year begin with her blessings!" The poem symbolizes Israel as a little sister, who despite suffering greatly remains faithful to her heavenly lover. The author, Abraham Ḥazan di Gerona (Gerondi), a cantor and Spanish poet who lived in the middle of the 13th century, probably also composed a melody for it in the hypodorian mode. His name appears in acrostic form in the poem.

One melody used for this text has points of similarity to contemporary airs from the Aegean region.
