= Ades Synagogue =

Orthodox synagogue in Jerusalem

- Hebrew: בית הכנסת עדס
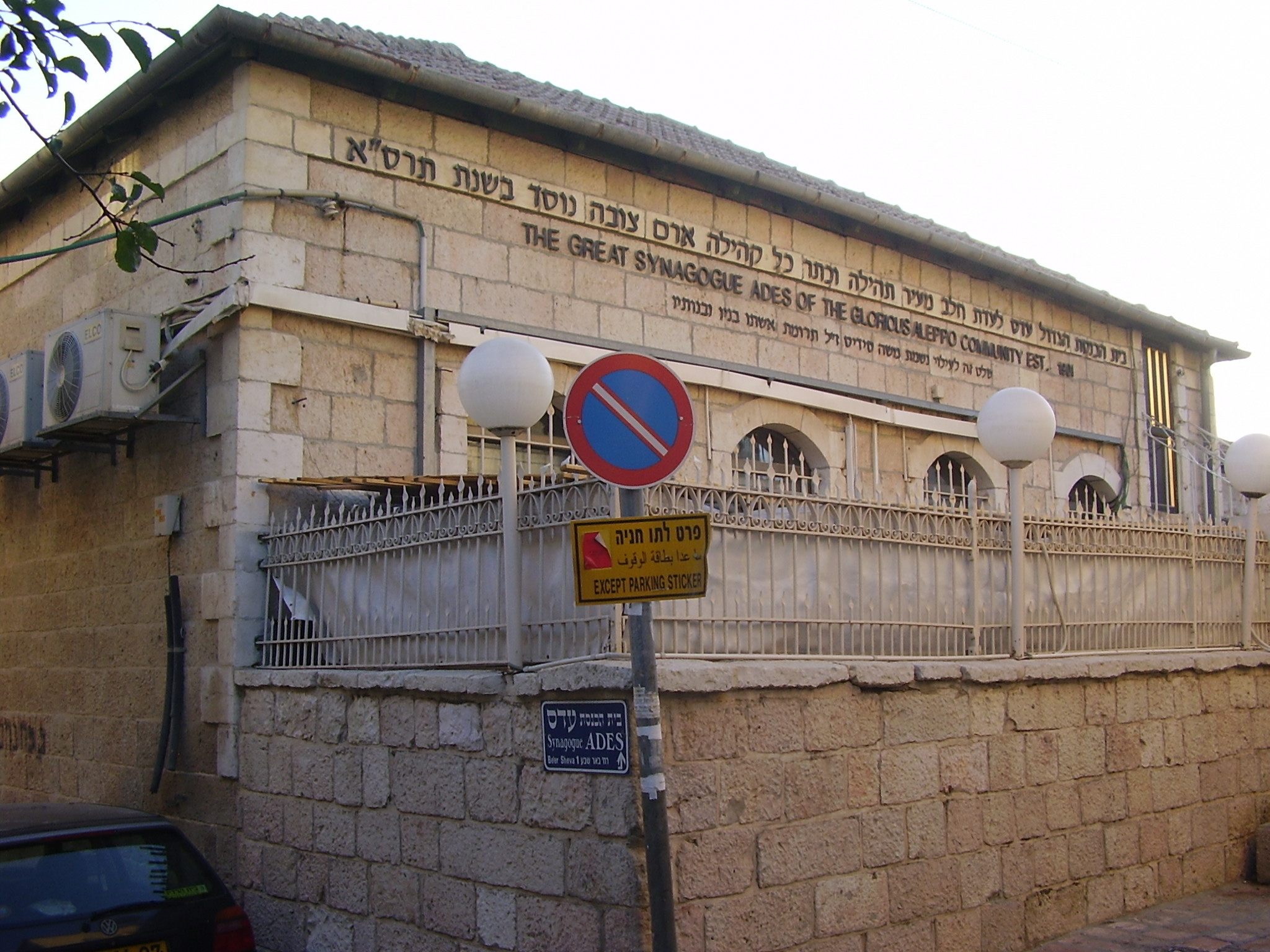
- The synagogue in 2009

- Location of the synagogue in Jerusalem

Religion
- Affiliation: Orthodox Judaism
- Rite: Nusach Sefard (Aleppian)
- Status: Active
- Notable artwork: Murals by Ya'akov Stark

Location
- Location: 1 Beer Sheba Street (corner of Shilo Street), Nachlaot, Jerusalem
- Coordinates: 31°46′54.58″N 35°12′41.03″E

Architecture
- Type: Synagogue architecture
- Style: Ottamon
- Funded by: Ovadiah Josiah Ades; Yosef Isaac Ades
- Completed: 1901; 2015 (restoration)
- Materials: Jerusalem stone

Website
- adessynagogue.com/en/

The Ades Synagogue (Hebrew: בית הכנסת עדס), also known as the Great Synagogue Ades of the Glorious Aleppo Community, is an Orthodox Jewish congregation and synagogue, located at 1 Beer Sheba Street, in the Nachlaot neighborhood of Jerusalem. Established in 1901 by Syrian immigrants, the synagogue is considered to be the center of Syrian Hazzanut in Israel.

== Origins ==
At turn of the 20th century, many members of Syria's Jewish community had emigrated to escape the economic downturn which followed the decline of the Ottoman Empire. While many settled in England, the United States or Latin America, some families moved to the Holy Land. Most community members were laborers, shopkeepers or merchants.

After some time, the synagogue was officially established in 1901 by a community of Jews from Aleppo, Syria. It is named after two cousins who financed the building: Ovadiah Josiah Ades and Yosef Isaac Ades. Yosef Ades was a wealthy man with connections in the Ottoman administration and a member of the City Council of Jerusalem. The new synagogue was designed as a neighborhood institution, and, at the time, was considered one of the most beautiful synagogues in Jerusalem. Although solidly constructed, the synagogue suffered damage during World War I and the 1947–1949 Palestine war. The synagogue is attended by Aleppian Jews, and by many different types of Sephardic Jews; nevertheless, the liturgy of the congregation remains Aleppian in its purest form.

== Architecture ==
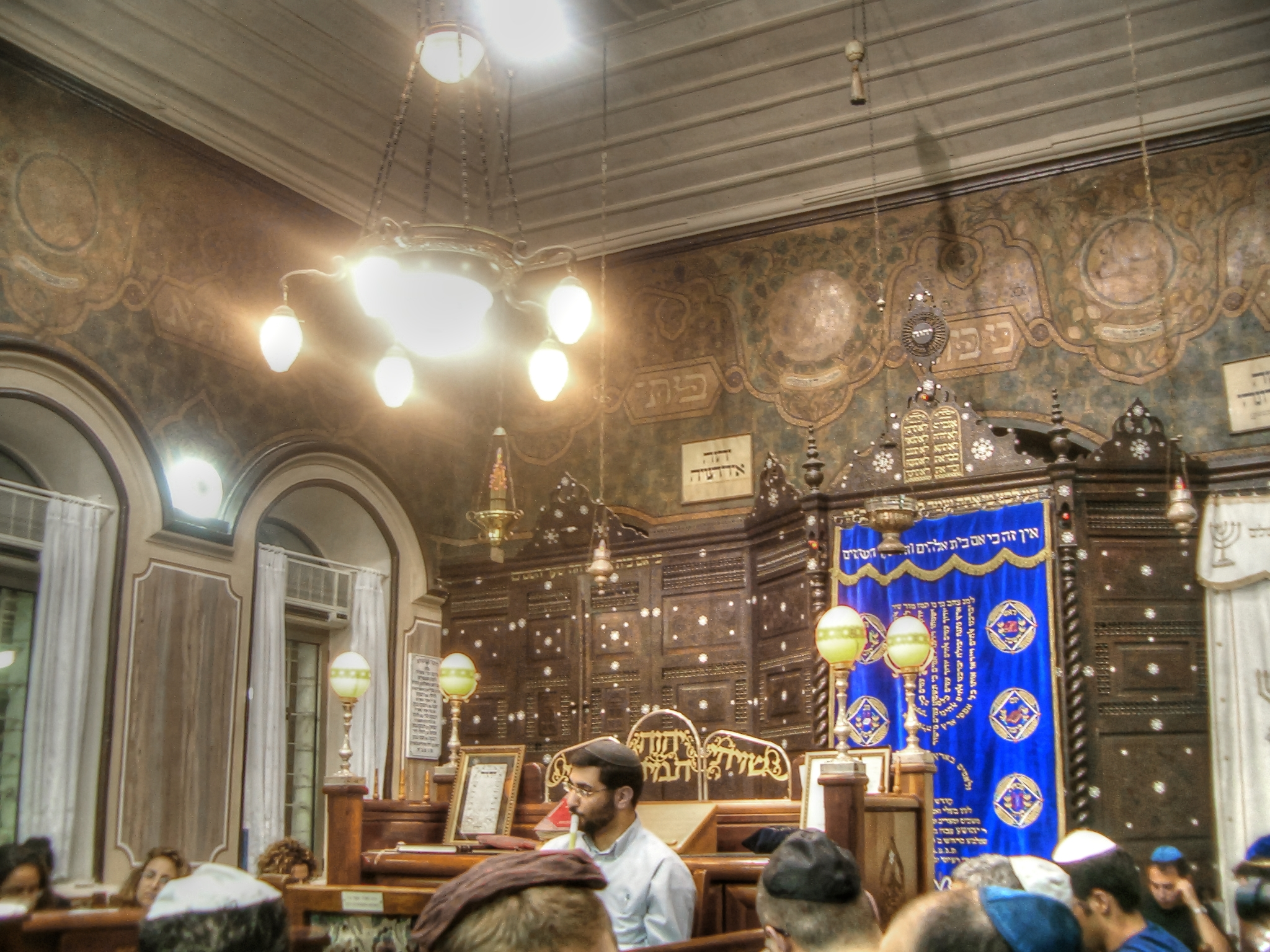
Interior of the synagogue

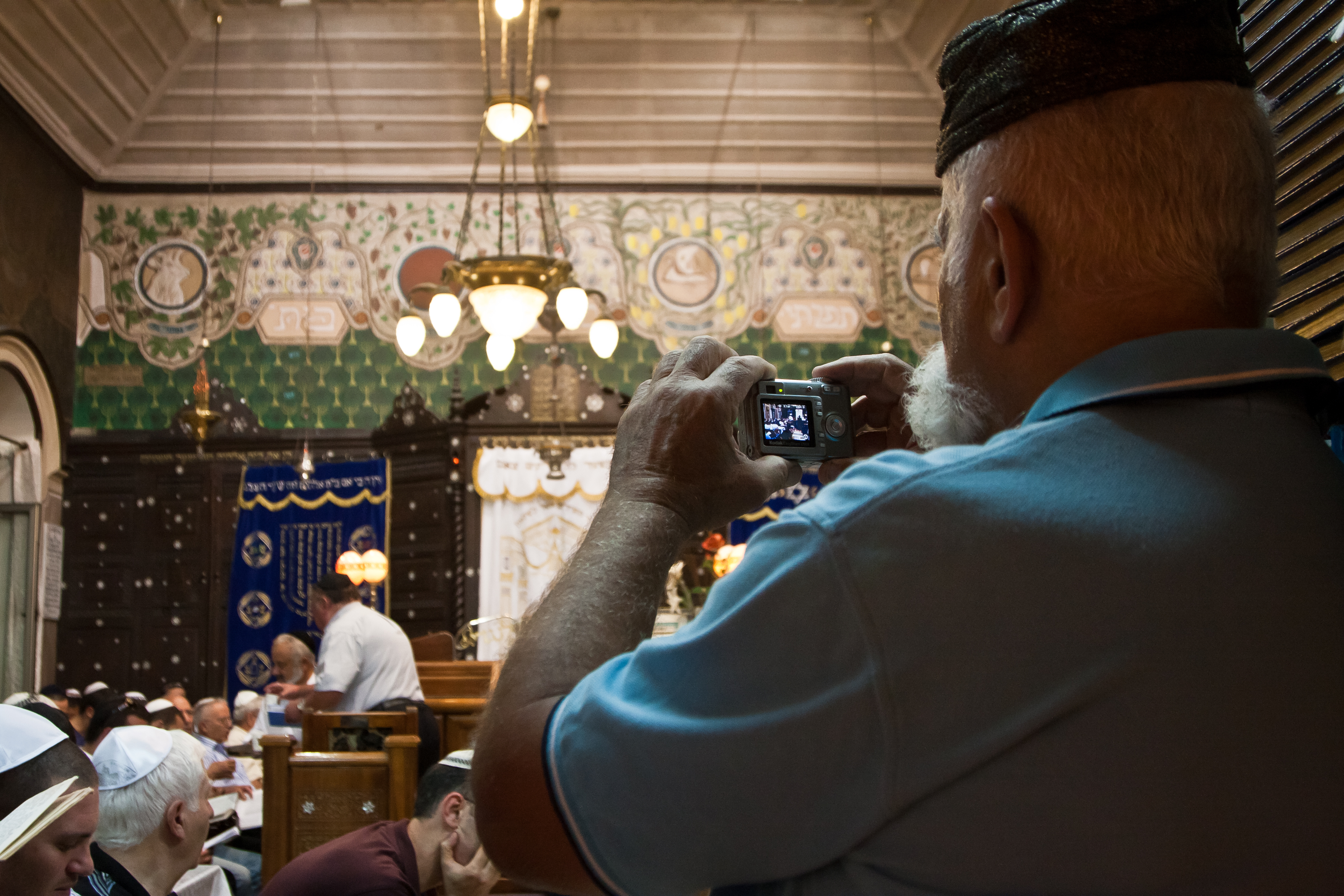
Syrian Jews worship in Ades Synagogue. Renowned as a center for Syrian Hazzanut (Syrian Jewish liturgical singing), Ades is one of only two synagogues in the world that maintains the ancient Syrian Jewish tradition of Baqashot, the marathon Kabbalistic singing held in the early hours of Shabbat morning to welcome the sunrise over winter months.

The traditional Middle Eastern-style interior is elaborate and well-kept, with a high ceiling, chandeliers, wooden benches facing a central dais, a small balcony for the women's section and a Holy Ark covering the entire eastern wall. The large ark, made of walnut and covered with intricate geometric designs inlaid with mother-of-pearl, was extensively repaired in 2001 in honor of the synagogue's centennial.

A mural depicting stylized representations of the Twelve Tribes of Israel, visible along the upper part of the walls, was painted around 1911–12 by Ya'acov Stark, a teacher at newly formed Bezalel Academy of Art and Design. Stark was part of a group of secular artists and intellectuals of the Second Aliya who sought to create a new, vibrant culture in Jerusalem. Over time, the mural was partially overpainted and the paint has discolored.

The Council for Conservation of Heritage Sites in Israel, a non-government entity, listed the building on its non-statutory heritage register. Major restoration of the murals were completed in 2015.

== Center for Syrian hazzanut ==
Ades attracts many visitors from Israel and abroad, in part because of its unique liturgical style. Ades has two daily morning services (including Shabbat and holidays), and a combined afternoon and evening service that begins just before sundown. The prayer services at the Ades synagogue differ only slightly from the services conducted in other Syrian synagogues throughout the world, the Weekly Maqam choices may differ from week to week.

Renowned as a center for Syrian hazzanut (Middle Eastern-style Jewish liturgical singing), Ades is one of only two synagogues in Jerusalem (and perhaps the world) that maintains the ancient tradition of baqashot, a set cycle of kabbalistic poetry sung in the early hours of Shabbat morning during the winter months. Baqashot sessions typically begin at 3 a.m. and are usually densely packed.

In many cases, cantors specifically go to this synagogue to learn maqamot and hazzanut. Throughout the last century, many famous cantors have emerged from Ades.

In recent years, Ades has received extensive attention due to a combination of its 100th anniversary, marked in 2001, its unique status and the trend toward an increased interest in pizmonim or religious song. The synagogue is a regular stop for walking tours in Nachlaot and is a common destination for many Syrian Jews from around the world visiting Israel for such occasions as a Bar Mitzvah, wedding, or to attend the Baqashot session.

== See also ==
- History of the Jews in Israel
- List of synagogues in Israel
- Synagogues of Jerusalem
