= Judeo-Syrian Arabic =

Dialect of Judeo-Arabic spoken in Syria

- Region: United States, Syria, Israel
- Ethnicity: Syrian Jews
- Language family: Afro-Asiatic: Semitic; West Semitic; Central Semitic; Arabic; Levantine Arabic; North Levantine Arabic; Syrian Levantine Arabic; Judeo-Syrian Arabic

Language codes
- ISO 639-3: –

Judeo-Syrian Arabic, also called Syrian Judeo-Arabic, is a dialect of the Judeo-Arabic dialects based on Syrian Arabic. It was traditionally written in the Hebrew script.

== History ==
After the exodus of Jews from Syria, Judeo-Syrian Arabic largely died out in favor of English, Spanish, and Hebrew among the Syrian Jewish diaspora. There was a Judeo-Syrian Arabic speaking community in İskenderun until 1998 but it no longer exists.

== Features ==
Judeo-Syrian Arabic contained Ladino and Hebrew loanwords.

== Media ==
There are YouTube videos and samples of Judeo-Syrian Arabic available online. The Syrian Jewish community in New York City has maintained a strong Judeo-Syrian Arabic musical tradition.

== Sample text ==
Judeo-Syrian Arabic	Transliteration	English
מתלו האדא כבז אלמסאכין אלדי אכלו אבהתנא בארד מצר. כל מינו ג׳ועאן יג׳י ויאכול	Mitlu hadha khibz elmasakin iladhi akalu abhatana be-ard maṣr. Kil minu ju'an yiji wayakol	This is the bread of affliction that our ancestors ate in the land of Egypt. All those who are hungry, let them enter and eat.
