= Baqashot =

Songs etc. of some Jewish communities

The baqashot (or bakashot, Hebrew: שירת הבקשות) are a collection of supplications, songs, and prayers that have been sung by the Sephardic Syrian, Moroccan, and Turkish Jewish communities for centuries each week on Shabbat mornings from the early hours of the morning until dawn. They are usually recited during the weeks of winter, from the Jewish festival of Sukkot through Purim, when the nights are much longer. The baqashot services can last for three to four hours. The Ades Synagogue in Jerusalem is the center of the Syrian practice today, and communities in Ashdod and Montreal are the center of the Moroccan practice.

== History ==
The custom of singing baqashot originated in Spain towards the time of the expulsion, but took on increased momentum in the Kabbalistic circle in Safed in the 16th century. Baqashot probably evolved out of the tradition of saying petitionary prayers before dawn and was spread from Safed by the followers of Isaac Luria (16th century). With the spread of Safed Kabbalistic doctrine, and coffee consumption—which allowed devotees to stay awake through the night—the singing of baqashot reached countries all round the Mediterranean and became customary in the communities of Morocco, Tunisia, Algeria, Rhodes, Greece, Yugoslavia, Egypt, Turkey and Syria. It also influenced the Kabbalistically oriented confraternities in 18th-century Italy, and even became customary for a time in Sephardic communities in western Europe, such as Amsterdam and London. (In Amsterdam the Shabbat service still begins with a small number of baqashot. In London the tunes for one or two of them have been preserved in the literature but the practice no longer exists.) By the turn of the 20th century baqashot had become a widespread religious practice in several communities in Jerusalem as a communal form of prayer.

In communities such as those of Aleppo, Turkey and Morocco, the singing of baqashot expanded to vast proportions. In those countries special books were compiled naming the tunes and maqamat together with the text of the hymns, in order to facilitate the singing of baqashot by the congregation. In these communities it was customary to rise from bed in the night on Shabbat in the winter months, when the nights are longer, and assemble in synagogue to sing baqashot for four hours until the time for the morning service.

Each country had its own collection of baqashot, and there is often little or no overlap between the collections of different countries. The Moroccan collection is known as "Shir Yedidot" (Marrakesh 1921): unlike in the Aleppo tradition, where the baqashot service is the same every shabbat, the Moroccan tradition has a different set of baqashot for each week. The Amsterdam collection is set out in the first part of Joseph Gallego's Imre No'am: the contents of this were probably derived from the Salonica tradition.

== The Turkish tradition ==
The equivalent tradition is known as "Shirat Hamaftirim", and the songs are performed by choirs of maftirim. The music and style of singing are based on Sufi and Ottoman classical music. This tradition flourished in Adrianople (present-day Edirne) in European Turkey, as well as in Salonica and Istanbul from the 17th century until the beginning of the 20th century.

The scholar Abraham Danon attested to the Edirne (Adrianople) maftirim tradition in this source from the late 1920s:

The institution for which these songs were intended is the choir called Maftirim, who are the singers or assistant cantors. From ancient times this was the custom in Adrianople: each Sabbath morning, before the morning prayer (in recent times they shift to the time of the Sabbath eve), the Levite's disciples gathered at the Portugal synagogue (and sang with their throats songs to praise the Lord and afterwards each one walked to his synagogue (which were thirteen in number before the great fire) where the [opening] prayer Barukh she-amar did not start before the ending of the Qaddish by the Maftirim. In the course of time, the cantors joined with the Levite's assistants (mezammerim) and sang together songs to the joy of the listeners gathered around them who were avid for the songs and they opened their mouths as if they wanted to swallow rain. This is the reason the majority of the [Jewish] inhabitants of Adrianople had some expertise in the art of song, because since their youth they were educated on the laps [of music]. I heard that the refugees who flew from that city due to the War moved to Constantinople where they reestablished the gathering of the Maftirim at the Galata quarter...

In both Edirne and Salonica, the maftirim would sing a fasıl for each Shabbat in a different makam. The maftirim would begin with a prayer in Aramaic Beresh ormanuta, followed by vocal improvisations of Biblical verses. Finally, the service would end with Mizmor shir leyom hashabbat and Qaddish.

The definitive edition of baqashot and piyyutim in the Ottoman-Turkish tradition was published in 1926 by Eliyahu Navon with the help of the Hazzan Avraham Behor Papo. This tome, Shire Israel be-Eres ha-Kedem (שירי ישראל בארץ הקדם), contained close to 500 piyyutim organized according to 39 makalmar (including obscure and compound makamlar). Some of the makamlar (in Modern Turkish spelling) include Rast, Dügâh, Segâh, Hüseyni, Acem, Acemasîran, Mâhur, Muhayyer, Nihâvent, Nevâ, Sabâ, Hicaz, Hüzzam, and Ussak.

== The Moroccan tradition ==
The standardized Moroccan baqashot are organized according to the Andalusian maqam system (nubah) as follows:

1. Ramal al-Maya - פרשת בראשית, לך לך , ויצא
2. al-Hijaz al-mashriqi - פרשת וירא, בשלח
3. al-Isbihan - פרשת נח, תולדות
4. ar-Rasd - פרשת חיי שרה,זכור-תצוה
5. al-'Iraq al-'Ajam - פרשת תרומה
6. al-hijaz al-Kabir - פרשת וישלח, מקץ, ויגש, בא, משפטים
7. rasd adh-Dhil - פרשת ויחי
8. al-'Ussaq - פרשת וארא
9. Gharibat al-Husayn - פרשת יתרו
10. al-Maya - פרשת וישב
11. al-Istihlal - פרשת שמות

A handful of compositions are from the period of the Golden Age of Spain, including works by Solomon ibn Gabirol, Abraham ibn Ezra, Moses ibn Ezra, and Yehuda Halevi. 26 of the close to 520 piyyutim and baqashot in the authoritative collection Shir Yedidot are composed by Rabbi Israel Najara (c. 1555–1625). Later composers from the 18th century include Rabbi Yaaqob ibn Sur (1673–1753) and R' David Ben Hassin (1727–1795), one of the most prolific Jewish Moroccan poets.

Although the baqashot are organized by the weekly Torah portions, the themes of the piyyutim range from Shabbat and Jewish holidays such as Purim, to Zion and Kabbalah. Some of the piyyutim are in Judeo-Arabic. As a whole, the Moroccan baqashot represent close to 8 centuries of Sephardic poetry and music.

One of the first printed collections of Andalusian baqashot was arranged by Rabbi Abraham Elmaliah from Mogador in 1856 under the name Soba' Semahot (שובע שמחות). This was a collection of all the "old" (לקדים) manuscripts of baqashot and piyyutim, as well as original compositions. Another collection Roni VeSimhi (רני ושמחי) was published in 1890 by Rabbi David Yefalah, also from Mogador, with many additional piyyutim assembled from manuscripts.

In 1921, a group of prominent Moroccan hazzanim standardized the structure of the baqashot into its modern form. These included Rabbi David Yefalah, R' David Elqayim, and R' David Afriat, all from Essaouira, and R' Hayyim Atar from Marrakesh. The first volume containing older piyyutim was called Shir Yedidot, while the second volume containing newer compositions was called Keter Kehuna. Many editions of Shir Yedidot were subsequently published in 1931, 1979, and more recently in 1999.

== The Syrian tradition ==
In Aleppo, Syria this custom seems to go back about 500 years. Most of the community would arise at 3:00AM to sing baqashot and to listen to the voices of the Hazanim, Paytanim, and Meshorerim. When they arrived at Mizmor Shir LeYom HaShabbat they would break to listen to a sermon by one of the Rabbis who discussed the Parashah of the week. When he concluded they would begin Mizmor Shir LeYom HaShabbat and sing all the rest of the baqashot.

The Syrian tradition was introduced to Jerusalem by Raphael Altaras, who came to that city from Aleppo in 1845 and founded a baqashot circle at the Kehal Tsiyon synagogue. In this way the custom of Baqashot became part of the mainstream Jerusalem Sephardic tradition. Another important influence was Jacob Ades (1857–1925), who immigrated to Jerusalem in 1895 and introduced the tradition to the Persian and Bukharan communities. The main centre of the tradition today is the Ades Synagogue in Nachlaot, where the leading spirit was rabbi Chaim Shaul Abud.

The Aleppian baqashot did not only reach Jerusalem. The Jews of Aleppo took this custom with them wherever they went: to Turkey, Cairo, Mexico, Argentina and Brooklyn, New York. Each of these communities preserved this custom in the original Halabi style without all the changes and embellishments that have been added to the baqashot by Jerusalem cantors over the years. Although these communities do not perform the baqashot on a weekly basis, nevertheless, they use the melodies of the baqashot throughout Saturday morning prayers.

=== Themes ===
There is a total of 66 songs in the Syrian baqashot book, and the collection is now regarded as closed, unlike the general body of pizmonim, where new pizmonim are still composed for special occasions. Each song is shown with its maqam, but they follow a fixed order of recitation which does not depend on the maqamat of the different songs. There are many sections within the baqashot. The sections are separated by different Biblical verses to be chanted in a different maqam.

The songs principally consist of the praise of God, songs for Shabbat, songs of longing for the Holy Land and so on, and include some piyyutim taken from the main body of the prayer book. These songs are considered more ancient and sacred than other pizmonim. Many of the songs contain acrostics identifying the author of that specific composition.

Baqashot are full of mystical allusions and traditions. Some of the songs contain references to some of the most sacred Jewish traditions. The following are examples of thematic songs:

- Song 1 and 34: listing of the 10 "Sefirot" (attributes) in the Kabbalah.
- Song 2: refers to the return to Zion in the time of redemption.
- Song 6 and 7: a song with each stanza ending with "boqer" (morning).
- Song 9: a song with each stanza ending with "yom" (day).
- Song 14: "Yasad besodo", discusses many different Kabbalistic concepts and how God created the world with his divine instruction.
- Song 15: "Eress Varom", discusses the seven days of creation, using one stanza for each day.
- Song 23: "Ki Eshmerah Shabbat", a well known song among all Jewish communities that was written by Rabbi Abraham Ibn Ezra.
- Song 28: "Yom Zeh le-Yisrael", a famous song written by Isaac Luria.
- Song 33: contains allusions to each of the four "Amidah" services recited on the Sabbath.

The baqashot are interrupted after Song 34 to sing Psalm 92, the Psalm of the Sabbath, one verse at a time, using a different maqam for each verse. There are many other verses of the Psalms scattered throughout the different songs, called "petihot", to serve as markers. Unlike the baqashot themselves, these are rendered by the hazzan or by the elder people as a mawwal (non-rhythmical solo cadenza).

- Song 35: "Shalom Vassedek" is a song written by Rabbi Shlomo Laniado. Each stanza ends with "Shlomo".
- Song 38: "Esah Libi" contains allusions to each of the nineteen blessings in the daily "Amidah" prayer.
- Song 39 and 40: two songs in Aramaic by Israel Najara.
- Song 41: "Ani Asaper" discusses the laws of Sabbath (the 39 categories of "work").
- Song 43: "Mahalalah" alludes to the Seven Heavens mentioned in the Kabbalah.
- Song 46: contains references to all the composers of the baqashot.
- Song 51: Halakhot of Shabbat.
- Song 53: a song dedicated to R. Shim'on bar Yohai, reputed author of the Zohar.
- Song 61 and 62: "Yedid Nefesh" (written by Eleazar Azikri, and also used by Ashkenazim) and "Agadelcha" (written by Abraham ibn Ezra).

The baqashot service concludes with Adon Olam (Song 66) followed by the ancient Kaddish prayer sung in the melody of the maqam for that specific Sabbath.

=== Composers ===
Included in most baqashot collections is a poem by Elazar Azikri (1533–1600), a kabbalist who lived in Safed. The poem “Yedid Nefesh”, or "Faithful Friend", was one of several which were published in 1601 in Venice in his “Sefer Haredim”. This collection also includes other famous poems, such as "Yom Zeh LeYisrael" by Isaac Handali, an obscure 15th century Crimean poet. In fact, it is only the 8 of the roughly 66 Syrian baqashot were composed by Israel Najara including"Yah Ribbon Alam," "Yomar Na Yisrael," and "Yodukha Ra'ayonay." Other composers, from the twelfth to the nineteenth century, include Hakhamim: Abraham Maimon (student of the kabbalist Moses Cordovero), Yosef Sutton, Solomon Ibn Gabirol, Yaacob Abadi, Mordechai Labaton, Eliyahu Hamaoui, Ezra Attiah, Abraham Ibn Ezra (who wrote "Agadelcha"), David Pardo, David Dayan, Shelomo Laniado (who wrote "Shalom vatzedek"), Yitzhak Benatar, Eliyahu Sasson, David Kassin, Shimeon Labi, Mordekhai Abadi and Shelomo Menaged.

More recent composers of baqashot from the Aleppo community are Refael Antebi Tabbush (1830-1919), the leading pizmonim composer, his pupil and foster son Moshe Ashear (Ashqar) and Ashear's pupil Chaim Shaul Abud.

Song 46, "Yah Melech Ram", alludes to the names of the baqashot composers.

Living classical composer Yitzhak Yedid is known for his combining of baqashot with contemporary classical writing.

According to Sephardic tradition, the baqashot are unique in that many of the melodies were composed for pre-existing texts, unlike many more recent pizmonim where the words were composed to fit an existing, often non-Jewish, melody. It is also believed that many melodies of the baqashot, unlike those of many pizmonim, are not borrowed from foreign sources.

== Current practices ==
The tradition of waking up before dawn and singing the baqashot still survives today in Jerusalem, in the Ades Synagogue in Nachlaot and the Moussaiof synagogue in the Bukharan quarter. The service is held only in the winter months, starting with the night of Shabbat Noach (the second Sabbath after Simchat Torah). The Edmond J. Safra Synagogue of Brooklyn, New York, also practices baqashot every Shabbat under the leadership of Rabbi Mansour and several Hazzanim.

In communities throughout the world not so committed to the idea of waking up before dawn, the baqashot melodies, or sometimes the actual songs, are still sung either in the course of the prayers or casually on certain occasions. But there are places that are still practicing this tradition like Shaare Sion synagogue in Argentina.

In some settings, the honor of singing the Kaddish goes to the highest bidder.

Refreshments, such as tea or arrak, are often served during the services.

The Turkish maftirim tradition persists and is practised to this day in Istanbul.

The Moroccan baqashot in Israel are sung regularly in cities such as Ashdod and Ashkelon with large populations of Moroccan Jews. They are also sung occasionally in Moroccan diasporic centers such as Montreal, Canada, and Paris, France.

== Recordings ==
There are multiple official and unofficial recordings of the Moroccan baqashot repertoire, including a set of 6 cds recorded by the late hazzan and paytan Rabbi Meir 'Atiyah.

"Ottoman Hebrew Sacred Songs" contains a handful of maftirim recordings of Samuel Benaroya in his old age. This rare recording of one of the last surviving singers of the maftirim choir of Edirne, Turkey.

A more comprehensive set recordings of the Turkish maftirim was released in 2010 under the title "Maftirim: Turkish-Sephardic Synagogue Hymns." David Behar, Hazan Isak Maçoro, and Hazan David Sevi were recorded in the 1980s but the recordings were lost until the mid-2000s. This 4-CD set was published in Turkey with an extensive accompanying booklet in Turkish, English, Hebrew and Ladino. The project was coordinated by Karen Gerson Şarhon.

Tape recordings of the Syrian baqashot were made in the 1980s in order to facilitate preservation. The recordings were made vocally; that is, without music instrumentation. They were recorded by three prominent community cantors: Isaac Cabasso, Mickey Kairey and Hyman Kairey. The project was organized by the Sephardic Archives, in association with the Sephardic Community Center in Brooklyn, New York.

David Betesh, coordinator of the Sephardic Pizmonim Project, more recently released the baqashot from these recordings onto the project's website (link below) for the general Internet public. Dr. Morris Shamah, Joseph Mosseri, and Morris Arking are responsible for putting the recordings together.

There are also DVD and CD recordings, with instrumental accompaniment, produced by the Ades Synagogue in Jerusalem.

== See also ==
- Central Synagogue of Aleppo
- History of the Jews in Turkey
- Moroccan Jews
- Syrian Jews
- Jewish Music Research Center (Hebrew University of Jerusalem): Baqqashah
