= David Ben Hassin =

Moroccan poet and rabbi

Personal life
- Born: 1727 Meknes, Morocco
- Died: 1792 (aged 64–65) Meknes, Morocco

Religious life
- Religion: Judaism

David ben Aaron ben Ḥassin (Hebrew: דוד בן אהרן בן חסין, Arabic: دايفيد بن حسان, in French sources David Hassine) (1727–1792) is considered to have been one of the greatest Jewish Moroccan poets and one of the best-known figures of Jewish liturgic poetry. His piyyutim (poems) were spread through the Sephardic world. He travelled to various communities in Morocco and also to Gibraltar, where his poems were well received.

He is the author of Tehila le David (Song of David), a collection of liturgic poems and elegies which have inspired many Moroccan singers, and of Mekoman chel zebahim ("Place of Sacrifices"), a versification of the slaughter rituals practiced in the ancient Temple in Jerusalem. Some of his poems include his name in acrostic. Moses Edrehi (1855) records that he saw a manuscript of Song of David that was sent from Meknes to the leaders of the Moroccan Jewish community in London for publication.

He was also the author of several Bible commentaries.
