= Syrian Jews =

Jewish ethnic group

Syrian Jews יהודי סוריה اليهود السوريون
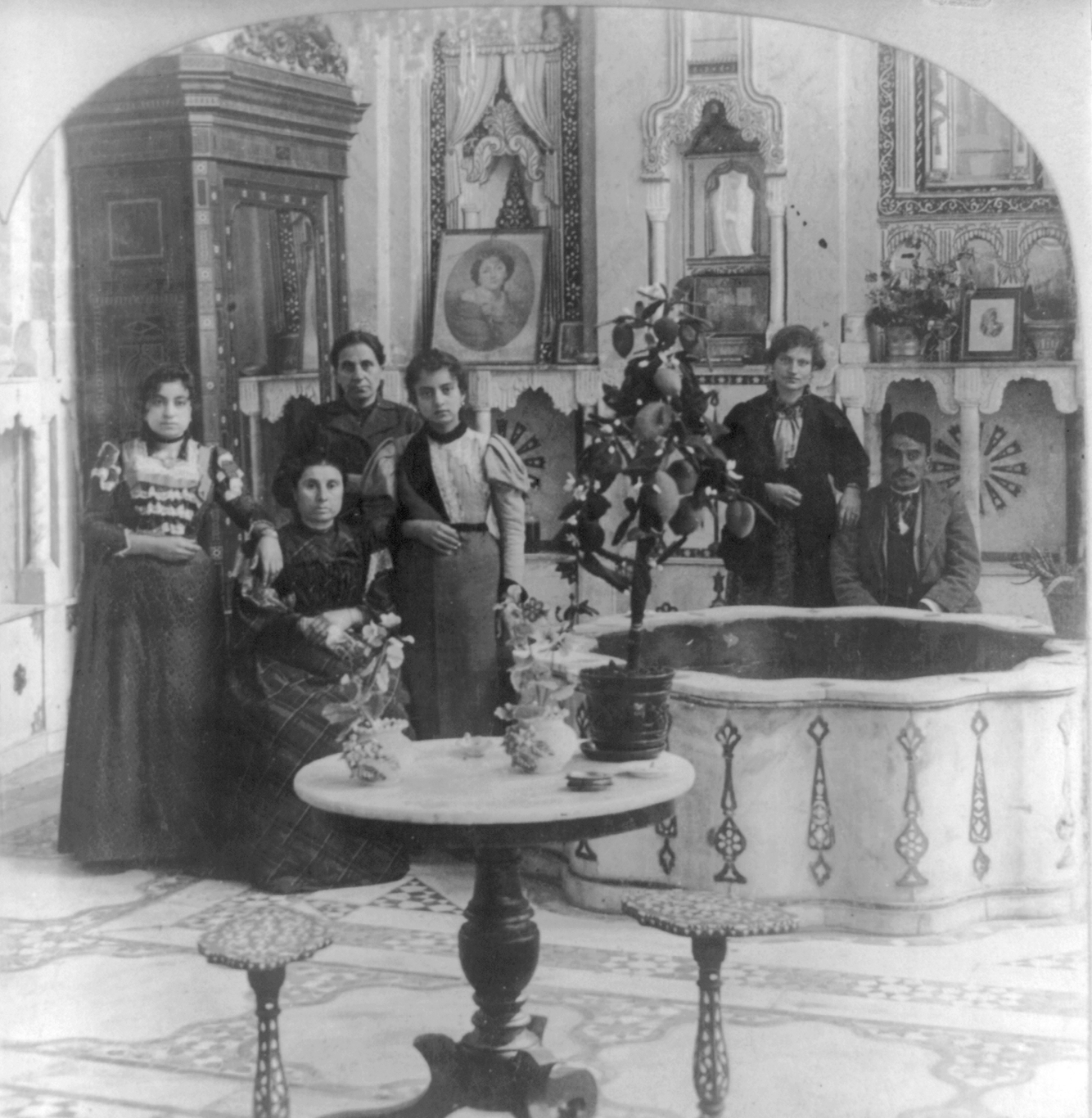
- A Jewish family in Damascus, pictured in their Damascene home, in Ottoman Syria, 1901

Total population
- 300,000 (est.)

Regions with significant populations
- Israel: 115,000
- United States: 75,000
- Argentina: 40,000
- United Kingdom: 20,000
- Mexico: 16,000
- Panama: 10,000
- Brazil: 7,000
- Chile: 2,300
- Syria: 6

Languages
- Modern Hebrew, Syrian Arabic, Judeo-Syrian Arabic, French, Spanish, English; Religious languages Syrian Hebrew (extinct), Mizrahi Hebrew

Religion
- Judaism

Related ethnic groups
- Mizrahi Jews, Sephardi Jews, Baghdadi Jews Ashkenazi Jews, other Jewish groups, non-Jewish Levantines

Syrian Jews (Hebrew: יהודי סוריה Yehudey Surya, Arabic: الْيَهُود السُّورِيُّون al-Yahūd as-Sūriyyūn, colloquially called SYs /ˈɛswaɪz/ in the United States) are Jews who live in the region of the modern state of Syria, and their descendants born outside Syria. Syrian Jews derive their origin from two groups: from the Jews who inhabited the region of today's Syria from ancient times (known as Musta'arabi Jews), and sometimes classified as Mizrahi Jews (Mizrahi is a generic term for the Jews with an extended history in Asia or North Africa); and from the Sephardi Jews (referring to Jews with an extended history in the Iberian Peninsula, i.e. Spain and Portugal) who fled to Syria after the Alhambra Decree forced the expulsion of the Jews from Spain in 1492.

There were large communities in Aleppo ("Halabi Jews", or "Aleppo Jews") and Damascus ("Shami Jews") for centuries, and a smaller community in Qamishli on the Turkish border near Nusaybin. In the first half of the 20th century a large percentage of Syrian Jews immigrated to the U.S., Latin America and Israel. Most of the remaining Jews left in the 28 years following 1973, due in part to the efforts of Judy Feld Carr, who claims to have helped some 3,228 Jews emigrate; emigration was officially allowed in 1992. The largest number of Jews of Syrian descent live in Israel. Outside Israel, the largest Syrian Jewish community is in Brooklyn, New York and is estimated at 75,000 strong. There are smaller communities elsewhere in the United States and in Latin America.

In 2011, there had been about 250 Jews still living within Syria, mostly in Damascus. In December 2014, fewer than 50 Jews remained in the area due to increasing violence and war. In October 2015, with the threat of ISIS nearby, some of the remaining Jews in Aleppo were taken to Ashkelon, Israel in a covert rescue operation. In August 2019, BBC Arabic visited some of the last remaining Jews living in Damascus. By the fall of the Assad regime, it is believed that only 6 Jews remained in Syria.

== History ==
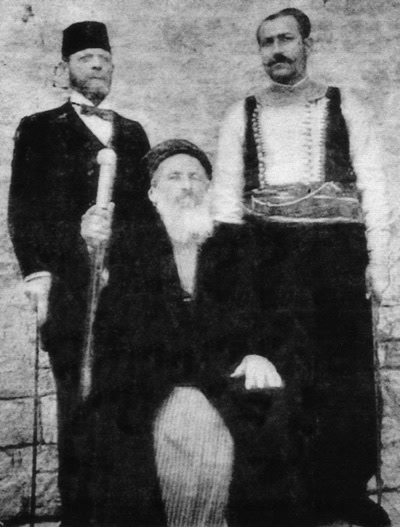
Chief Rabbi Jacob Saul Dwek, Hakham Bashi of Aleppo, Syria, 1907.

According to the community's tradition, Jews have been in Syria since ancient times, since the time of King David and certainly since early Roman times. Jews from this ancient community were known as Musta'arabim "Arabizers" to themselves or Moriscos to the Sephardim. Many Sephardim arrived following the expulsion from Spain in 1492 and quickly took a leading position in the community. For example, five successive Chief Rabbis of Aleppo were drawn from the Laniado family.

In the 18th and 19th centuries, some Jews from Italy and elsewhere, known as Señores Francos (Frank Lords), notable Franco families are the Ancona, Silvera, and Pichotto families they settled in Syria for trading reasons, while retaining their European nationalities.

Kurdish Jews, hailing from the region of Kurdistan, represent another sub-group of Syrian Jews. Their presence in Syria predates the arrival of Sephardic Jews following the Reconquista. The ancient communities of Urfa and Çermik also formed part of the broader Syrian community and the Aleppo community included some migrants from these cities.

Today, some distinctions between these sub-groups are preserved because particular families have traditions about their origins. However, there is considerable intermarriage among the groups, and all regard themselves as "Sephardim" in a broader sense. One can tell Aleppo families of Spanish descent by the fact that they light an extra Hanukkah candle. This custom was established in gratitude for their acceptance by the more native Syrian-based community.

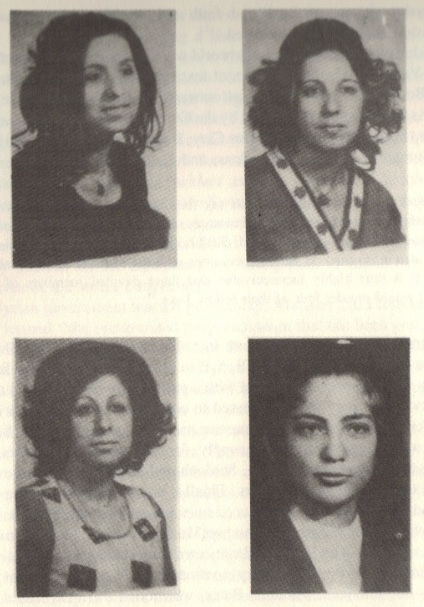
The Zeibak sisters: Four Syrian-Jewish girls (three sisters and their cousin) who were raped, killed, and mutilated while trying to flee to Israel in 1974

In the 19th century, following the completion of the Suez Canal in Egypt in 1869, trade shifted to that route from the overland route through Syria, and the commercial importance of Aleppo and Damascus underwent a marked decline. Many families left Syria for Egypt (and a few for Lebanon) in the following decades, and with increasing frequency until the First World War, many Jews left the Middle East for western countries, mainly Great Britain, the United States, Mexico and Argentina.

In the time period surrounding Israeli independence the situation for Syrian Jews deteriorated, when an anti-Jewish riot in Aleppo killed dozens of Jews and destroyed hundreds of homes, shops, and shuls in 1947. This marked the beginning of mass Jewish emigration from Syria to Israel, despite the Syrian government's willingness to put to death those who attempted to flee. Other repressive measures against Jews included barring them from government service, not allowing them to own telephones or driver's licenses, and forbidding them to buy property. Initially, Lebanon allowed Syrian Jews escaping to Israel free passage through its territory. This ended when the Syrian government began confiscating the passports of Jews, and Lebanon announced that it could not allow persons through its borders without travel documents. Between 1948 and 1961, about 5,000 Syrian Jews managed to reach Israel. Many Syrian Jews also immigrated to Lebanon, but a few were deported back to Syria upon the Syrian government's request. The Syrian Jews in Lebanon, along with the rest of the Lebanese Jewish community, would largely leave that country for Israel, Europe, and the Americas in later years.

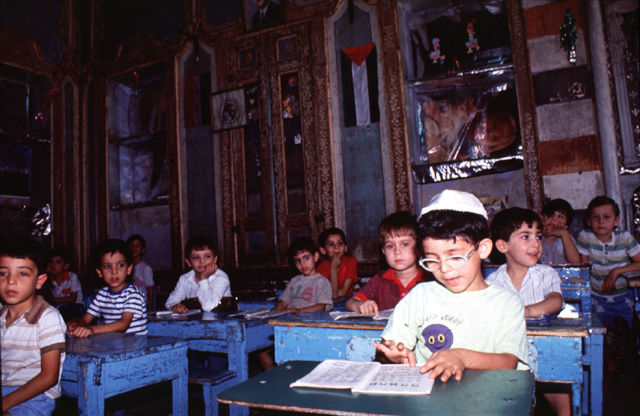
Jewish pupils in the Maimonides school in Al-Amarah, in the historic Maison Lisbona in Damascus. The photo was taken shortly before the exodus of most of the remaining Syrian Jewish community in 1992

Beginning on the Passover holiday of 1992, most of the last 4,000 remaining members of the Damascus Jewish community, as well as the Aleppo community and the Jews of Qamishli, were permitted under the government of Hafez al-Assad to leave Syria provided they did not immigrate to Israel. Within a few months, thousands of Syrian Jews made their way to Brooklyn, with a few families choosing to go to France and Turkey. The majority settled in Brooklyn with the help of their kin in the Syrian Jewish community.

In December 2025, Hind Kabawat registered the Jewish Heritage in Syria Foundation (JHS), making it the first Jewish organization ever registered in Syria. The organisation plans to return properties confiscated under previous governments and restore Jewish holy sites. In late June 2026, restoration work began at Damascus's main Jewish cemetery along the road to Damascus International Airport under the Syrian Mosaic Foundation led by Joe Jajati, focusing on cleaning and repairing neglected graves and improving site security.

== Present-day Syrian Jewish communities ==
=== Israel ===
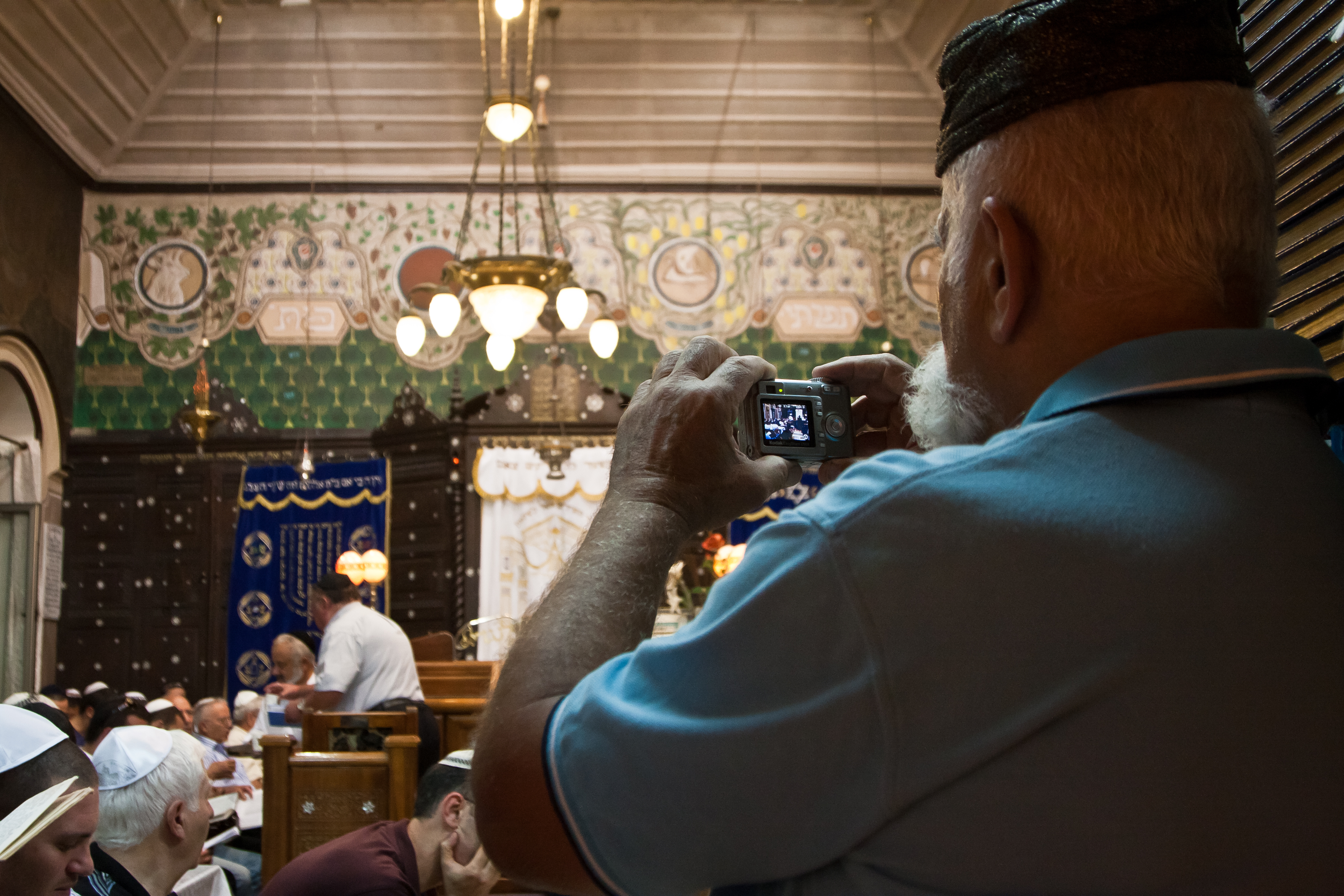
Syrian Jews worship in Ades Synagogue. Renowned as a center for Syrian Hazzanut (Syrian Jewish liturgical singing), Ades is one of only two synagogues in the world that maintains the ancient Syrian Jewish tradition of Baqashot, the marathon Kabbalistic singing held in the early hours of Shabbat morning to welcome the sunrise over winter months.

There has been a Jewish Syrian presence in Jerusalem since before 1850, with many rabbinical families having members both there and in Damascus and Aleppo. These had some contact with their Ashkenazi opposite numbers of the Old Yishuv, leading to a tradition of strict orthodoxy: for example in the 1860s there was a successful campaign to prevent the establishment of a Reform synagogue in Aleppo. Some Syrian traditions, such as the singing of Baqashot, were accepted by the mainstream Jerusalem Sephardi community.

A further group immigrated to Palestine around 1900, and formed the Ades Synagogue in Nachlaot. This still exists, and is the main Aleppo rite synagogue in Israel, though its membership now includes Asiatic Jews of all groups, especially Turkish Jews. There is also a large Syrian community in Holon and Bat Yam.

Many Jews fled from Syria to Palestine during the anti-Jewish riots of 1947. After that, the Syrian government clamped down and allowed no emigration, though some Jews left illicitly. In the last two decades, some emigration has been allowed, mostly to America, though some have since left America for Israel, under the leadership of Rabbi Abraham Hamra.

The older generation from prior to the establishment of the Israeli state retains little or no Syrian ethnic identity of its own and is well integrated into mainstream Israeli society. The most recent wave is integrating at different levels, with some concentrating on integration in Israel and others retaining closer ties with their kin in New York and Mexico.

There is a Merkaz 'Olami le-Moreshet Yahadut Aram Tsoba (World Center for the Heritage of Aleppo Jewry) in Tel Aviv, which publishes books of Syrian Jewish interest.

=== United Kingdom ===
The main settlement of Syrian Jews was in Manchester, where they joined the local Spanish and Portuguese synagogues, which had a mixed community that included North African, Turkish, Egyptian and Iraqi as well as Syrian Jews. This community founded two synagogues; one (Shaare Tephillah) in north central Manchester, which has since moved to Salford, and the other (Shaare Hayim) on Queenston Road in West Didsbury, in the southern suburbs. A breakaway synagogue (Shaare Sedek) was later formed on Old Lansdowne Road with more of a Syrian flavor; it and the Queenston Road congregation later merged, while retaining both buildings. They remained known as the "Lansdowne Road synagogue" and the "Queen's Road synagogue", after the names those streets bore in the 1930s. While there are still Sephardim in the Manchester area, a number have left for communities in the Americas. The Sha'are Sedek synagogue has since been sold, and a new synagogue with the same name has been opened in Hale, to be closer to the current centers of the Sephardic and general Jewish populations.

=== United States ===
Syrian Jews first immigrated to New York in 1892. The first Syrian Jew to arrive was Jacob Abraham Dwek, along with Ezra Abraham Sitt. They initially lived on the Lower East Side of Manhattan. Later settlements were in Bensonhurst, Midwood, Flatbush, and along Ocean Parkway in Gravesend, Brooklyn. These Brooklyn residents spend the summers in Deal, New Jersey. Many of the older residents have a third home in Aventura, Florida to escape the cold weather. There had been a further wave of immigration from Syria in 1992, when the Syrian government under Hafez al-Assad began allowing emigration of Jews. Jerry Seinfeld, comedian, is of Syrian Jewish descent from his mother's side.

=== Argentina ===
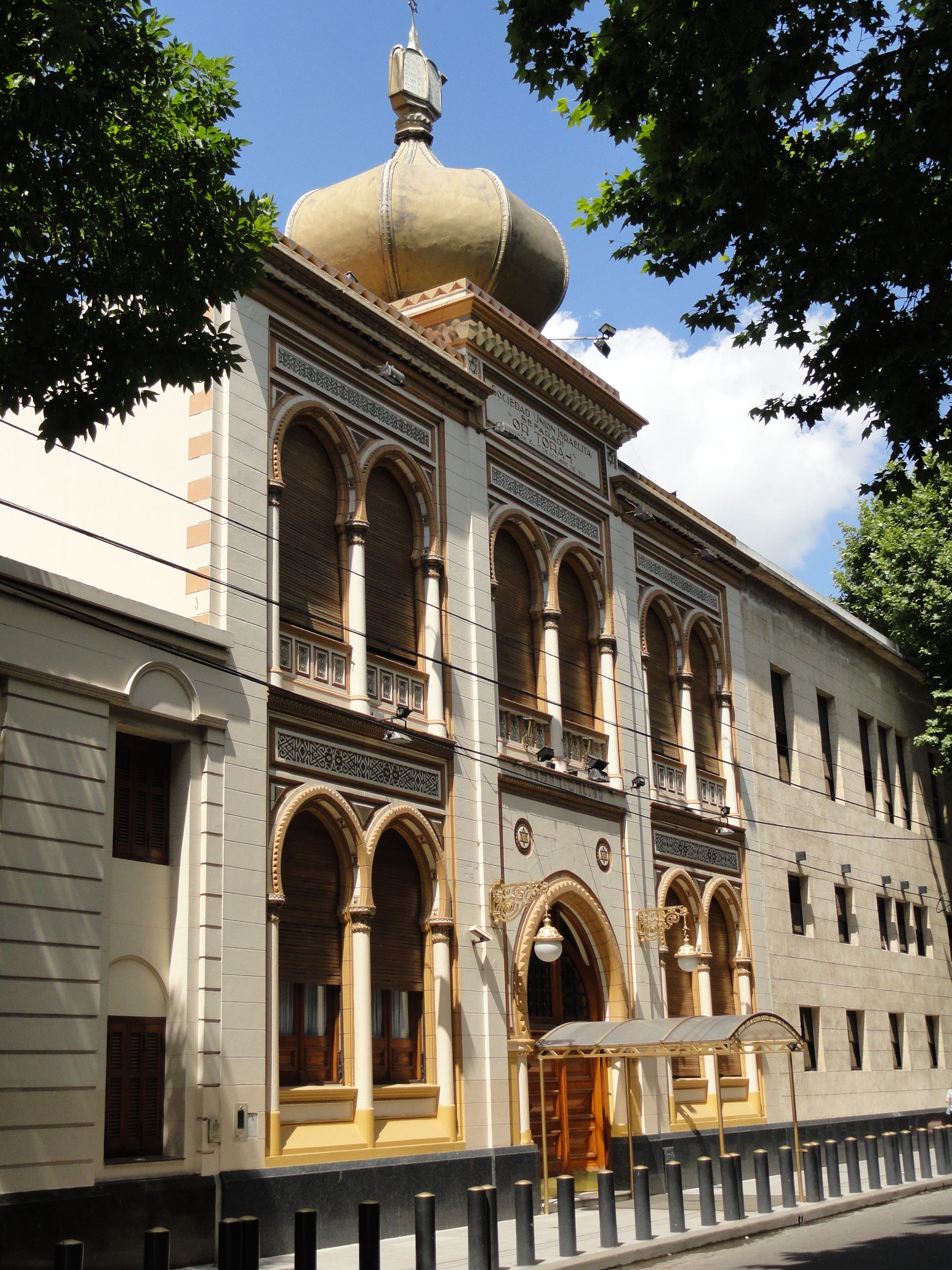
Synagogue Or Torah, built by Damascene Jews

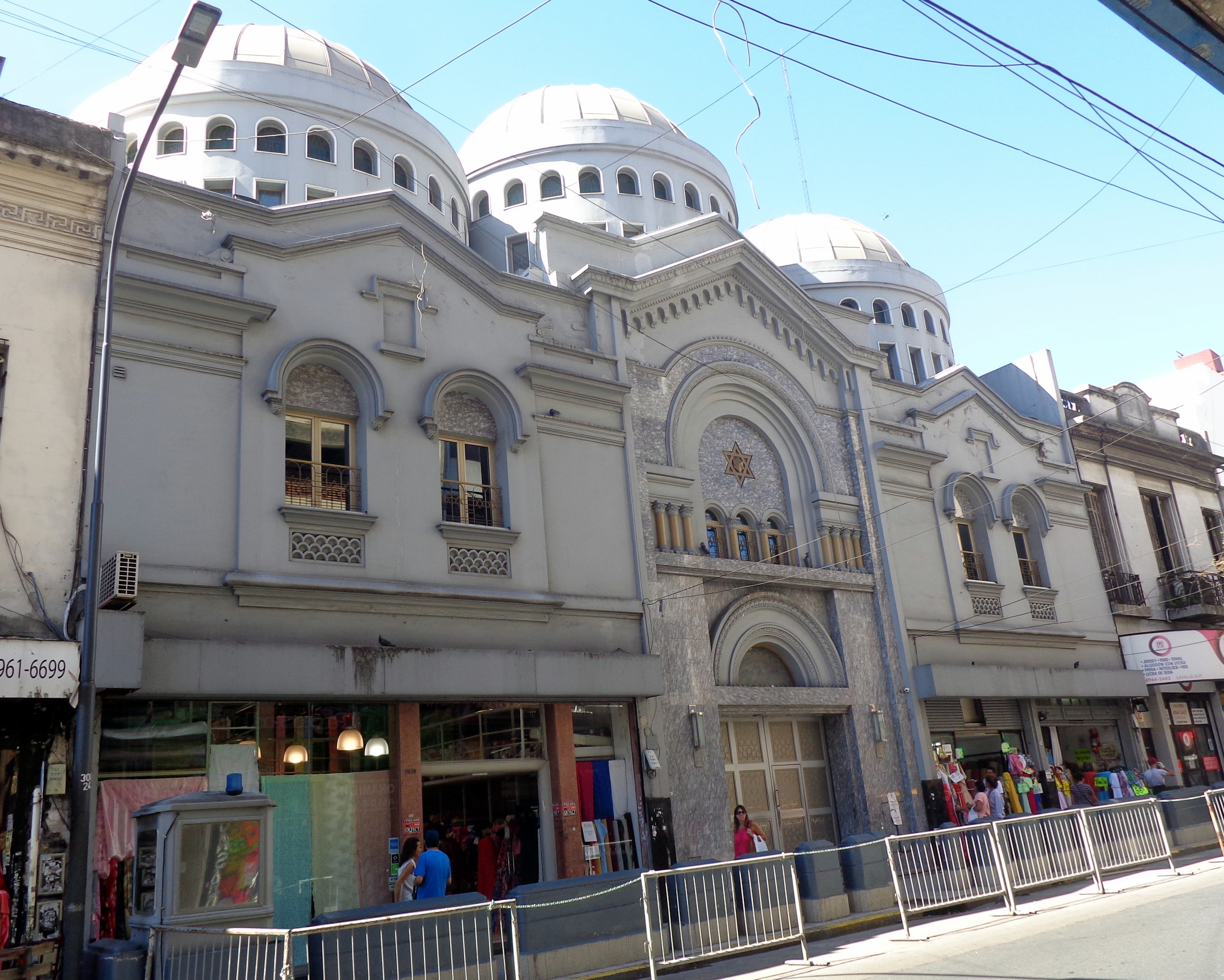
Yesod Hadat Synagogue, built by Aleppine Jews

Argentina has the third largest Syrian Jewish community after Israel and the United States. The largest Jewish community is in the capital Buenos Aires. The Sephardim, and especially the Syrians, are a sizeable community. Syrian Jews are most visible in the Once district, where there are many community schools and temples. For some decades there has been a good-natured rivalry between the Shami (Damascene) community of "Shaare Tefila (Pasito)" synagogue and the Halebi (Aleppan) community of "Sucath David" across the street. The most influential rabbinic authority was Rabbi Isaac Chehebar from the "Yessod Hadat" congregation on Lavalle street; he was consulted from all across the globe, and had an influential role in the recovery of parts of the Aleppo Codex. There are many kosher butchers and restaurants catering to the community. There were important communities in Villa Crespo and Flores neighborhoods as well. Many Syrian Jews own clothing stores along Avellaneda avenue in Flores, and there is a community school on Felipe Vallese (formerly Canalejas) street. Some important clothing chains such as Chemea and Tawil, with tens of shops each, were started by Syrian Jews. Carolina Duer is an Argentine-Syrian Jewish world champion boxer.

=== Brazil ===
The majority of the Syrian community of Brazil come from Beirut, Lebanon, where most have settled between the late 19th century and the fall of the Ottoman Empire. A lot of the Halabi merchant traders maintained links and resided between Aleppo and Beirut a far back as the 18th century. A later arrival of Syrian Jews to Lebanon took place due to their expulsion from Syria following the creation of the State of Israel in 1948 and the subsequent violent anti-Jewish pogroms perpetrated by their Muslim neighbours. They left Beirut in wake of the first Lebanese Civil War. Most Syrian Jews established themselves in the industrial city of São Paulo, being attracted there by the many commercial opportunities it offered. The community became very prosperous, and several of its members are among the wealthiest and the politically and economically most influential families in São Paulo. The community first attended Egyptian synagogues, but later founded their own synagogues, most notably the Beit Yaakov synagogues in the neighbourhoods of Jardins and Higienopolis. The community has its own school and youth movement, and claims a strong Jewish identity and low assimilation rate. The majority of the community affiliates itself institutionally with Orthodox Judaism, though few could be described as personally fully Orthodox. There are approximately 7,000 Syrian Jews in Brazil.

=== Chile ===
With its liberal immigration policy, Chile attracted some Syrian Jews, particularly from Damascus, beginning in the late 1800s. Many Syrian Jews also escaped from Syria and Palestine, provinces of the Ottoman Empire during the World War I. At present there are 2,300 Syrian Jews in Chile.

=== Mexico ===
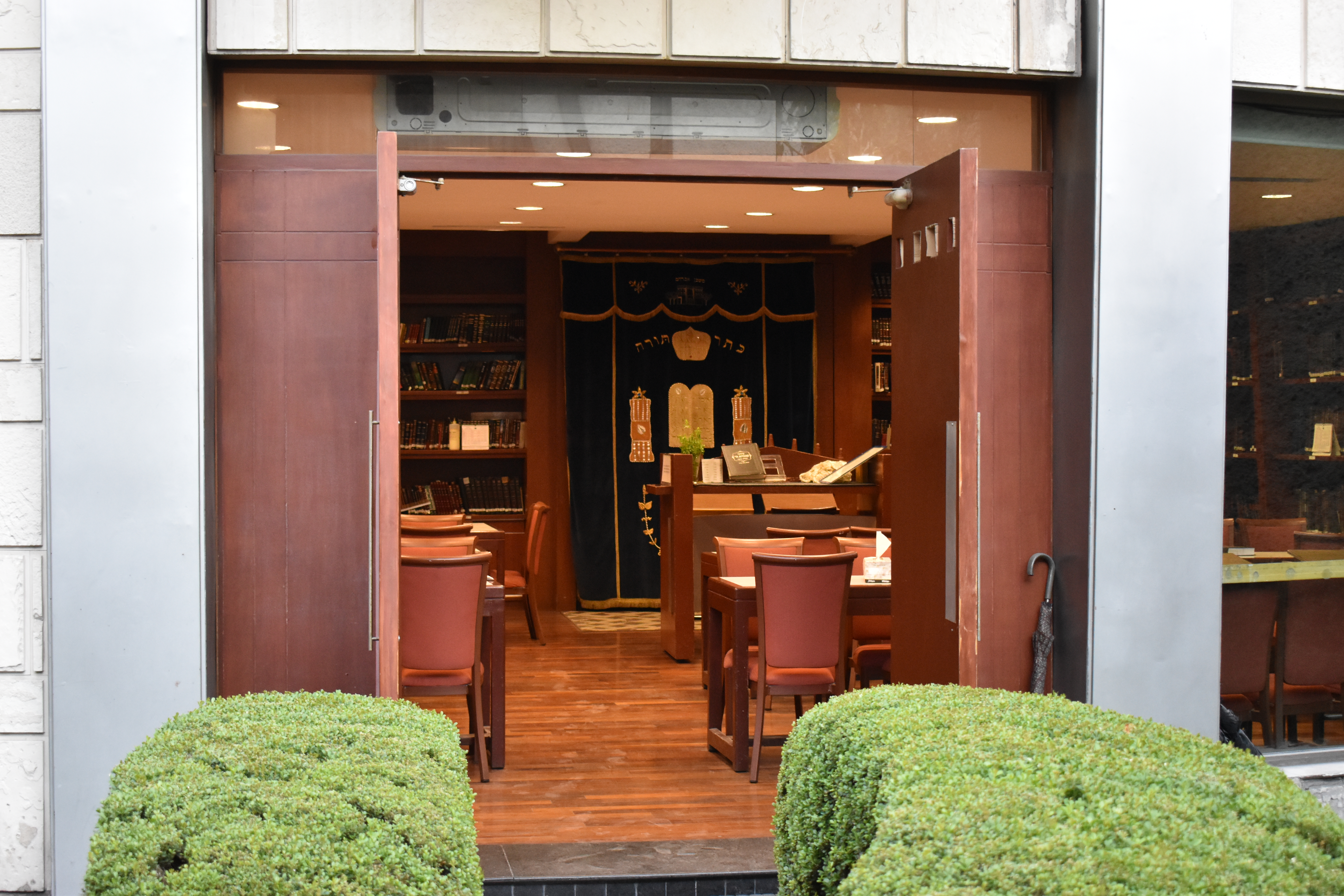
Synagogue in Polanco, Mexico City founded by immigrants from Damascus

There have been Syrian Jews from Damascus and Aleppo in Mexico City since the early years of the 20th century. Originally they worshipped in a private house transformed into a synagogue – Sinagoga Ketana (Bet Haknesset HaKatan) located in Calles de Jesús María. The first organized Jewish community in Mexico was Alianza Monte Sinai founded on June 14, 1912, mainly by natives of Damascus (together with a few Sephardi Jews) and led by Isaac Capon. They later founded the first synagogue, Monte Sinaí, on Justo Sierra street in downtown Mexico City, originally led by Rabbi Laniado, which still holds a daily service of mincha (afternoon prayer). The Damascene community also bought the first Jewish burial place in Tacuba street on June 12, 1914, which is in use to this day and has been expanded by the recent purchase of the adjacent land.

The Rodfe Sedek synagogue, for Aleppan Jews, was established in 1931, largely through the efforts of Rabbi Mordejay Attie. This synagogue, known also as Knis de Cordoba, is situated at 238 Cordoba Street in the Colonia Roma quarter of Mexico City. At the time this neighborhood was home to the largest concentration of Jews from Aleppo in Mexico City. The first mikveh (ritual bath) in Mexico was established within the Rodfe Sedek synagogue. In 1982 a funeral house was built in the courtyard of the synagogue.

Also in the 1930s the members of Monte Sinaí established a large synagogue for Damascene Jews situated at 110 Querétaro Street in the Colonia Roma area. They have welcomed Jews of all backgrounds into their midst, which has allowed tremendous growth over the years. In 1938 Jewish immigrants from Aleppo set up Sociedad de Beneficencia Sedaká u Marpé, which evolved into a separate Jewish community: since 1984 it has been known as Comunidad Maguen David. Monte Sinai and Maguen David are now the largest Jewish communities in Mexico, having more than 30 synagogues, a community center and a school each, with Maguen David having at least 5 schools and plans for more (Colegio Hebreo Maguen David, Yeshiva Keter Torah, Beit Yaakov, Emek HaTorah, Colegio Atid and Colegio Or HaJaim).

=== Panama ===
Panama also received a large number of Syrian Jewish immigrants, mostly from Halab (Aleppo), where they constitute the largest group in Panama's 15,000 strong Jewish Sephardic community. The first wave of immigrants arrived in the late 1940s after riots in Aleppo due to the Arab–Israeli conflict. The community consists of many synagogues all united under its flagship, Shevet Ahim Synagogue, where their late Chief Rabbi Zion Levy officiated. The community maintains close contact with their counterparts in North America as well as Israel. In his later years, Rabbi Levy oversaw the construction of new synagogues in Panama City and worked for smooth relations with the country's Arab and Muslim communities. He frequently phoned the country's imam for a talk. By the time of his death, the Shevet Ahim community numbered 10,000 Jews, 6,000 of whom are Torah-observant. The community now includes several synagogues, mikvahs, three Jewish schools, a yeshiva, a kollel, and a girls' seminary, along with several kosher restaurants and supermarkets.

=== Halabi/Shami divide in diaspora ===
As Syrian Jews migrated to the New World and established themselves, a divide frequently persisted between those with roots in Aleppo (the Halabi Jews, alternately spelled Halebi or Chalabi) and Damascus (the Shami Jews), which had been the two main centers of Jewish life in Syria. This split persists to the present day, with each community maintaining some separate cultural institutions and organizations, and to a lesser-extent, a preference for in-group marriage.

== Traditions and customs ==
=== Liturgy ===
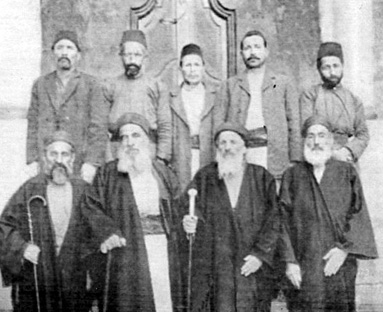
Rabbi Jacob Saul Dwek, Rabbi Reuven Ancona and officials of the great synagogue of Aleppo.

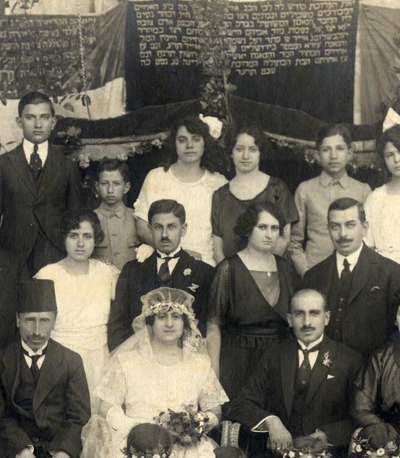
Jewish wedding in Aleppo, Syria, 1914

There exists a fragment of the old Aleppo prayer book for the High Holy Days, published in Venice in 1527, and a second edition, starting with the High Holy Days but covering the whole year, in 1560. This represents the liturgy of the Musta'arabim (native Arabic-speaking Jews) as distinct from that of the Sephardim proper (immigrants from Spain and Portugal): it recognizably belongs to the "Sephardic" family of rites in the widest sense, but is different from any liturgy used today. For more detail, see Old Aleppo ritual.

Following the immigration of Jews from Spain following the expulsion, a compromise liturgy evolved containing elements from the customs of both communities, but with the Sephardic element taking an ever-larger share. In Syria, as in North African countries, there was no attempt to print a Siddur containing the actual usages of the community, as this would not generally be commercially viable. Major publishing centres, principally Livorno, and later Vienna, would produce standard "Sephardic" prayer books suitable for use in all communities, and particular communities such as the Syrians would order these in bulk, preserving any special usages by oral tradition. (For example, Ḥacham Abraham Ḥamwi of Aleppo commissioned a series of prayer-books from Livorno, which were printed in 1878, but even these were "pan-Sephardic" in character, though they contained some notes about the specific "minhag Aram Tsoba".) As details of the oral tradition faded from memory, the liturgy in use came ever nearer to the "Livorno" standard. In the early years of the 20th century, this "Sephardic" rite was almost universal in Syria. The only exception (in Aleppo) was a "Musta'arabi" minyan at the Central Synagogue of Aleppo, but the liturgy of this group only differed from the "Sephardic" by a few textual variants and the order of some of the hymns.

The liturgy of Damascus differed from that of Aleppo in some details, mostly because of its greater proximity to the Holy Land. Some of the laws specific to Eretz Yisrael are regarded as extending to Damascus, and the city had ties both to the Safed Kabbalists and to the Jerusalem Sephardic community.

The liturgy now used in Syrian communities round the world is textually speaking Oriental-Sephardic. That is to say, it is based on the Spanish rite as varied by the customs of Isaac Luria, and resembles those in use in Greek, Turkish and North African Jewish communities. In earlier decades some communities and individuals used "Edot ha-Mizraḥ" prayer-books which contained a slightly different text, based on the Baghdadi rite, as these were more commonly available, leaving any specifically Syrian usages to be perpetuated by oral tradition. The nearest approach to a current official prayer book is entitled Kol Ya'akob, but many other editions exist and there is still disagreement on some textual variants.

The musical customs of Syrian communities are very distinctive, as many of the prayers are chanted to the melodies of the pizmonim, according to a complicated annual rota designed to ensure that the maqam (musical mode) used suits the mood of the festival or of the Torah reading for the week. See Syrian Cantors and the Weekly Maqam.

=== Pizmonim ===
Syrian Jews have a large repertoire of hymns, sung on social and ceremonial occasions such as weddings and bar mitzvahs. Pizmonim are also used in the prayers of Shabbat and holidays. Some of these are ancient and others were composed more recently as adaptations of popular Arabic songs; sometimes they are written or commissioned for particular occasions, and contain coded allusions to the name of the person honoured. There is a standard Pizmonim book called "Shir uShbaha Hallel veZimrah", edited by Cantor Gabriel A. Shrem under the supervision of the Sephardic Heritage Foundation, in which the hymns are classified according to the musical mode (maqam) to which the melody belongs. As time passes, more and more pizmonim are getting lost, and therefore efforts are being made by the Sephardic Pizmonim Project, under the leadership of Dr. David M. Betesh, to preserve as many pizmonim as possible. A website to facilitate its preservation was set up at Pizmonim.com.

=== Baqashot ===
It was a custom in Syrian Jewish communities (and some others), to sing Baqashot (petitionary hymns), before the morning service on Shabbat. In the winter months, the full corpus of 66 hymns is sung, finishing with Adon Olam and Kaddish. This service generally lasts about four hours, from 3:00am to 7:00am.

This tradition still obtains full force in the Ades Synagogue in Jerusalem. In other communities such as New York, it is less widespread; though the hymns are sung on other occasions.

=== Pronunciation of Hebrew ===
The Syrian pronunciation of Hebrew is similar to that of other Mizrahi communities and is influenced both by Sephardi Hebrew and by the Syrian dialect of Levantine Arabic. The Syrian pronunciation of Hebrew is less archaic than the Iraqi Hebrew of Iraqi Jews and closer to standard Sephardic Hebrew. That affects especially the interdentals. Nevertheless, Syrian and Iraqi Hebrew are very closely related because of their location and geographic proximity, as is the case with most eastern Jewish communities in the Arabic world other than Yemenite Jews. Particular features are as follows:

- ב (Bet without dagesh) is traditionally /b/, but in Israel, it is often now [v] under the influence of Israeli Hebrew.
- ג (Gimel without dagesh) is often pronounced [ɣ], like Arabic غ (voiced velar fricative).
- ד (Dalet without dagesh) is pronounced [d] as in Israeli Hebrew, not [ð] as in Yemenite Hebrew.
- ה (He with mappiq) is often pronounced with a very short postpended schwa [ə].
- ו (Waw) is pronounced [v], not [w].
- ח (Heth) is pronounced [ħ], like Arabic ح (voiceless pharyngeal fricative).
- ט (Teth) is pronounced [tˤ], like Arabic ط (pharyngealized voiceless alveolar plosive).
- כ (Kaph without dagesh) is often pronounced [x], like Arabic خ (voiceless velar fricative).
- ע (Ayin) is pronounced [ʕ], like Arabic ع (voiced pharyngeal fricative).
- צ (Tsade) is pronounced [sˤ], like Arabic ص (pharyngealized voiceless alveolar fricative), like English voiceless "s" but with the tongue a little retracted.
- ק (Qoph) is supposed to be [q], like Classical Arabic ق (voiceless uvular stop) but sometimes slips historically into [ʔ], a glottal stop, as in colloquial Syrian Arabic, and today into [k], in conformity with English and Israeli Hebrew.
- ת (Taw without dagesh) is pronounced [t] as in Israeli Hebrew, not [θ] as in the Yemenite and Iraqi pronunciations.

The retention of distinct emphatic sounds such as [ħ] and [tˤ] differentiates Syrian pronunciation from many other Sephardic/Mizrahi pronunciations, which have failed to maintain these phonemic or phonological distinctions, such as between [t] and [tˤ].

Vowels are pronounced as in most other Sephardi and Mizrahi traditions. For example, there is little or no distinction between pataḥ and qamats gadol ([a]) or between segol, tsere and vocal sheva ([e]). Ḥiriq is sometimes reduced to [ɪ] or [ə] in an unstressed closed syllable or near an emphatic or guttural consonant.

A semivocalic sound is heard before pataḥ ganuv (pataḥ coming between a long vowel and a final guttural): thus ruaḥ (spirit) is pronounced [ˈruːwaħ], and siaḥ (speech) is pronounced [ˈsiːjaħ].

=== Judaeo-Arabic dialect ===
Jews in Syria had distinctive dialects of Judaeo-Arabic called Judeo-Syrian Arabic. They are not known to have any current speakers.

Syrian Jews had a distinctive traditional sharḥ (translation of the Bible into Syrian Judaeo-Arabic), which was used in teaching children, though not for any liturgical purpose. One version of this was printed in about 1900: another (from the so-called Avishur Manuscript) was printed by the Merkaz Olami le-Moreshet Yahadut Aram Tsoba in 2006, with pages of translation facing pages from the Jerusalem Crown. This print contains the Torah only, but volumes for the rest of the Bible are planned.

Many Syrian Jews have the custom of reciting each paragraph of the Passover Haggadah first in Hebrew and then in Judaeo-Arabic.

=== Aleppo Codex ===
The Aleppo Codex, now known in Hebrew as Keter Aram Tsoba, is the oldest and most famous manuscript of the Bible. Written in Tiberias in the year 920, and annotated by Aaron ben Asher, it has become the most authoritative Biblical text in Jewish culture. The most famous halachic authority to rely on it was Maimonides, in his exposition of the laws governing the writing of Torah scrolls in his codification of Jewish law (Mishneh Torah). After its completion, the Codex was brought to Jerusalem. Toward the end of the 11th century, it was stolen and taken to Egypt, where it was redeemed by the Jewish community of Cairo. At the end of the 14th century the Codex was taken to Aleppo, Syria (called by the Jews Aram Zobah, the biblical name of part of Syria)—this is the origin of the manuscript's modern name.

For the next five centuries, it was kept closely guarded in the basement of the Central Synagogue of Aleppo, and was considered the community's greatest treasure. Scholars from round the world would consult it to check the accuracy of their Torah scrolls. In the modern era the community would occasionally allow academics, such as Umberto Cassuto, access to the Codex, but would not permit it to be reproduced photographically or otherwise.

The Codex remained in the keeping of the Aleppo Jewish community until the anti-Jewish riots of December 1947, during which the ancient synagogue where it was kept was broken into and burned. The Codex itself disappeared. In 1958, the Keter was smuggled into Israel by Murad Faham and wife Sarina, and presented to the President of the State, Yitzhak Ben-Zvi. Following its arrival, it was found that parts of the Codex, including most of the Torah, had been lost. The Codex was entrusted to the keeping of the Ben-Zvi Institute and the Hebrew University of Jerusalem, though the Porat Yosef Yeshivah has argued that, as the spiritual heir of the Aleppo community, it was the legitimate guardian. Some time after the arrival of the Codex, Mordechai Breuer began the monumental work of reconstructing the lost sections, on the basis of other well-known ancient manuscripts. Since then a few other leaves have been found.

Modern editions of the Bible, such as the Hebrew University's "Jerusalem Crown" and Bar-Ilan University's "Mikraot Gedolot ha-Keter", have been based on the Codex. The missing sections have been reconstructed on the basis of cross-references in the Masoretic Text of surviving sections, of the notes of scholars who have consulted the Codex and of other manuscripts.

The codex is now kept in the Israel Museum, in the building known as "The Shrine of The Book." It lies there along with the Dead Sea Scrolls and many other ancient Jewish relics.

=== Attitudes to conversion ===
At the time of the Mahzor Aram Soba of 1527 and 1560, conversions were clearly accepted, as there are blessings in the Mahzor on the rituals of conversions. However, in the early 20th century the Syrian Jewish communities of New York and Buenos Aires adopted rulings designed to discourage intermarriage. The communities would not normally carry out conversions to Judaism, particularly where the conversion is suspected of being for the sake of marriage, or accept such converts from other communities, or the children of mixed marriages or marriages involving such converts.

Ben-Zion Meir Hai Uziel, then Sephardi Chief Rabbi of Israel, was asked to rule on the validity of this ban. He acknowledged the right of the community to refuse to carry out conversions and to regard as invalid conversions carried out by other communities in which marriage is a factor. At the same time, he cautioned that persons converted out of genuine conviction and recognized by established rabbinic authorities should not be regarded as non-Jewish, even if they were not allowed to join the Syrian community.

The ban is popularly known within the Syrian community as the "edict" or "proclamation" (in Hebrew, takkanah). Every 20 years or so, the edict is reaffirmed by all leaders and rabbis of the community, often with extra clauses. A full list is as follows:

- Buenos Aires, 1937 (R. David Setton)
- New York, 1935 (Hacham Hayim Tawil)
- New York, 1946 "Clarification"
- New York, 1972 "Affirmation"
- New York, 1984 "Reaffirmation"
- New York, 2006 "Reaffirmation"

There has been some argument as to whether the ruling amounts to a blanket ban on all converts or whether sincere converts from other communities, not motivated by marriage, may be accepted. The relevant sentence in the English language summary is "no male or female member of our community has the right to intermarry with non-Jews; this law covers conversions which we consider to be fictitious and valueless". In the 1946 "Clarification" a comma appears after the word "conversions", which makes it appear that all conversions are "fictitious and valueless", though this understanding is contested, and there is no equivalent change in the Hebrew text.

However, there are exceptions to the rule, such as conversions for the sake of adoptions always being permitted. Additionally, communal rabbis (such as the late Chief Rabbi Jacob S. Kassin) have occasionally recognized conversions carried out by certain rabbis, such as members of the Chief Rabbinate of Israel. Nonetheless, these rulings strongly discourage people from converting into the Syrian Jewish community as they require them to show commitment to Judaism above and beyond what is required by the normative rabbinical laws of conversion.

Supporters of the edict argue that it has been demographically successful, in that the rate of intermarriage with non-Jews in the Syrian community is believed to be less than 3%, as opposed to anything up to 50% in the general American Jewish population. Opponents argue that this fact is not a result of the edict, but of widespread attendance at Orthodox day schools, and that a similarly low rate of intermarriage is found among other Orthodox day-schooled Jews despite the absence of any equivalent of the edict.

=== Cuisine ===
As in most Arab and Mediterranean countries, Syrian Jewish cuisine is fairly similar to other types of Syrian cuisine (which in turn reflect some Turkish influence), although some dishes have different names among Jewish members. This is partly because of the eastern Mediterranean origins of Judaism as such and partly because the similarity of the Islamic dietary laws to the Kashrut laws. Some dishes of Spanish and Italian origin have become part of the repertoire through the influence of the Sephardi and Franco waves of immigration: a few of these have become part of the wider Syrian cuisine. Syrian (and Egyptian) recipes remain popular in Syrian Jewish communities around the world. There are traditions linking different dishes to the Jewish festivals.

Popular dishes are as follows:

- Riz: Mixture of white rice and short cut noodles
- Hamid: Soup made with lemon juice, parsley, mint, onion, potato, celery and garlic
- Fetteh: Chickpea broth cooked with Tequesquite. Often eaten with pita and yoghurt
- Kibbeh riz: Mashed cooked rice and ground beef shaped into a patty and fried
- Kibbeh Nabulsieh: minced meat with pine nuts and pomegranate seeds in a burghul torpedo shaped fried shell often served with peas
- Kibbeh ħamda: Small kibbeh balls used in soups
- Kibbeh bisfarjal: Same as above but with quince instead of potatoes; eaten on (Rosh Hashanah)
- Kibbeh Yakhnieh: Meat balls with chick peas and spinach
- Kibbeh bisfiha: Meat burgers with eggplant
- Fawleh blahmeh or Loubieh blahmeh: Lamb or veal cubes with string beans or black-eyed peas
- Ijjeh or eggah: Egg dish, similar to a Spanish omelette with parsley, potato or cheese
- Ijjeh blahmeh: Fried meat burgers with eggs served with lemon and radishes
- Muħshi Badinjan: Stuffed eggplant with rice, meat, and chickpeas
- Muħshi Kousa: Stuffed zucchini with rice, meat, nana mint, and lemon
- Yaprak: Stuffed vine leaves with rice and meat
- Kebab: Meat balls (sometimes with cherries or pomegranate paste)
- Chicken sofrito: Chicken sautéed with lemon juice, turmeric, and cardamom
- Beida bi-lemoune: Chicken soup mixed with an egg and lemon
- Dfeena: Shabbat meat and bean stew equivalent to cholent
- Ḥammin eggs: Hard-boiled eggs stained brown by being baked with dfeena or boiled with onion skins, sometimes adding tea leaves or coffee grounds
- Laħmajeen (or Laħmabajeen): Meat (sometimes with pomegranate paste or prune juice) on a small, round pastry base
- Maoudeh: A stew of fried cube-shaped potatoes with lamb, beef, or chicken meat
- Matambre: Boiled squash, cheese, eggs, and pieces of pita
- Mfarraket al-ful: Cold minced beef with fava beans and scrambled eggs (for Shabbat)
- Sambousak: Small half-moon pastry filled with cheese or meat
- Sahlab: Hot milk with starch and sugar often served with cinnamon
- Kousa b'jibn: Squash baked with cheese
- M'jadra: Rice and lentil or burghul and lentil kedgeree
- Tabbouleh: Burghul salad with vine leaves
- Bazirjan or Muhammara: Burghul crushed wheat with pomegranate paste or prune juice
- Shakshouka or Beid bifranji: Boiled tomato puree with onion and eggs
- Beid blaban: Boiled yogurt with garlic, nana mint, and scrambled eggs
- Ka'ak: Aniseed-flavored bracelets with sesame seeds
- Ghreibe: Shortbread biscuits, often in bracelet form
- Ma'amoul: Shortbread pastries with date or nut fillings (the Jewish version differs from the Arab in not using semolina flour)
- Kanafeh mabroumeh or ballorieh: Fine threads of shredded filo dough filled with pistachios or ricotta
- Orange Passover cakes derived from Spanish recipes through Sephardic immigration
- Coconut jam: (used at Passover)
- Sharab al-loz: Iced drink made from almond syrup; generally a summer drink, but also used before Yom Kippur. Additionally, it is most commonly shared at happy occasions such as when a couple gets engaged.

== Notable people ==
- Jerry Seinfeld – American comedian, whose mother was from Aleppo
- Dennis W. Sciama – British physicist of Syrian descent who, through his own work and that of his students, played a major role in developing British physics after the Second World War.
- Frank Harary – mathematician, widely recognized as the father of modern graph theory
- Shiri Maimon – singer
- Salha "Mama" Bobo – businesswoman, philanthropist
- Paula Abdul – American singer and actress
- Robert Malley – American diplomat, he was the lead negotiator on the Iran 2015 nuclear deal
- Moshe Safdie – world-renowned architect
- Joshua and Benjamin Safdie – American filmmakers and actors
- Oren Safdie – playwright and screenwriter
- Joseph Safra – the richest banker in the world before his death
- Edmond Safra – billionaire banker
- Moise Safra – billionaire businessman
- Isaac Shalom — Businessman and community leader
- Stanley Chera – billionaire real estate developer
- Jeff Sutton – billionaire real estate developer, founder of Wharton Properties
- Joseph Sitt – founder of Thor Equities and Ashley Stewart
- Sonny Gindi & Family – founders of Century 21
- Amanda Setton – American actress
- Dov Charney – entrepreneur and clothing manufacturer
- Isaac Mizrahi - American fashion designer and actor
- Jose Mugrabi – billionaire businessman and art collector
- Joseph Nakash – American billionaire, co-founder of Jordache clothing company.
- David Nahmad – billionaire art dealer, his sons Joseph and Helly Nahamd are also art dealers
- Ezra Nahmad – billionaire art dealer and collector
- Isaac Saba Raffoul – Mexican billionaire businessman
- Gilbert Bigio – businessman and the only billionaire in Haiti
- Elie Horn – Brazilian billionaire
- Ronald Cohen – British businessman
- Joseph Cayre – businessman and real estate developer
- Simon Halabi – Syrian-British businessman
- Joseph Matalon – the richest billionaire in Jamaica, his father emigrated from Damascus
- Eli Matalon – Jamaican businessman and politician
- William Haddad – American lobbyist
- Joyce Mansour – French author and surrealist poet
- Dan Hedaya – actor
- Carlos Maslatón – Argentine lawyer and financial analyst

== See also ==
- Ades Synagogue
- Central Synagogue of Aleppo
- Jewish Quarter of Damascus
- History of Syria
- Persecution of Jews
- Syrian Cantors
- Weekly Maqam
- List of Syrians

== Sources ==
=== General ===
- Abadi, J.F., A Fistful of Lentils: Syrian-Jewish Recipes from Grandma Fritzie's Kitchen: Harvard 2002. Hardback: ISBN 1-55832-218-3
- Ades, Abraham, Derech Ere"tz: Bene Berak 1990
- Assis, Yom Tov, Frenkel, Miriam and Harel, Yaron (eds.), Aleppo Studies. The Jews of Aleppo: their History and Culture (Jerusalem, vol. 1 2009; vol 2 2013) [Hebrew and English]
- Collins, Lydia, The Sephardim of Manchester: Pedigrees and Pioneers: Manchester 2006 ISBN 0-9552980-0-8
- Dobrinsky, Herbert C.: A treasury of Sephardic laws and customs: the ritual practices of Syrian, Moroccan, Judeo-Spanish and Spanish and Portuguese Jews of North America. Revised ed. Hoboken, N.J. : KTAV; New York, N.Y. : Yeshiva Univ. Press, 1988. ISBN 0-88125-031-7
- Dweck, Poopa and Michael J. Cohen, Aromas of Aleppo: The Legendary Cuisine of Syrian Jews: HarperCollins 2007, ISBN 0-06-088818-0, ISBN 978-0-06-088818-3
- Harel, Yaron, Sifre Ere"tz: ha-Sifrut ha-Toranit shel Ḥachme Aram Tsoba (The Books of Aleppo: Torah Literature of the Rabbis of Aleppo): Jerusalem 1996 summarized here
- Harel, Yaron (ed.), Syrian Jewry: History, Culture and Identity: Ramat Gan 2015 (Hebrew and English)
- Abraham Zevi Idelsohn, Phonographierte Gesänge und Aussprachsproben des Hebräischen der jemenitischen, persischen und syrischen Juden: Vienna 1917
- Katz, Ketsi'ah (1981), "Masoret ha-lashon ha-'Ibrit shel Yehude Aram-Tsoba (Ḥalab) bi-qri'at ha-Miqra ve-ha-Mishnah (The Hebrew Language Tradition of the Jews of Aleppo in the Reading of the Bible and Mishnah)", ʻEdah Ṿe-Lashon, Magnes Press, Jerusalem, ISSN 0333-5143
- Kligman, Mark, Maqam and Liturgy: Ritual, Music and Aesthetics of Syrian Jews in Brooklyn, Detroit 2009
- Laniado, David Tsion, La-Qedoshim asher ba-are"ts: Jerusalem 1935 repr. 1980
- Laniado, Samuel, Debash ve-ḤALAB al-leshonech: Jerusalem 1998/9 (Hebrew)
- Roden, Claudia, A New Book of Middle Eastern Food: London 1986 ISBN 0-14-046588-X
- Roden, Claudia, The Book of Jewish Food: New York 1997, London 1999 ISBN 0-14-046609-6
- Sethon, Menasheh, Kelale Diqduq ha-Qeriah, Aleppo 1914, printed in Ḥamwi, Peh Eliyahu pp. 391–400
- Shelemay, Kay Kaufman, Let Jasmine Rain Down, Chicago Studies in Ethnomusicology: 1998. Hardback: ISBN 0-226-75211-9, Paperback: ISBN 0-226-75212-7.
- Smouha, Patricia, Middle Eastern Cooking, London 1955 ASIN: B0000CJAHX
- Sutton, David, Aleppo: City of Scholars: Artscroll 2005 ISBN 1-57819-056-8 (partly based on Laniado, La-Qedoshim asher ba-are"ts)
- Sutton, Joseph, Aleppo Chronicles: the Story of the Unique Sepharadeem of the Ancient Near East – in their Own Words: Brooklyn 1988
- Sutton, Joseph, Magic Carpet: Aleppo in Flatbush: Brooklyn 1979
- Zenner, Walter P., A Global Community: The Jews from Aleppo, Syria: Wayne State University Press 2000 ISBN 0-8143-2791-5
- Zenner, Walter P., "The Ethnography of Diaspora: Studying Syrian Jewry," Marshall Sklare Award address, 1997

=== Prayer books ===
==== Historic ====
- Maḥzor Aram Tsoba: Venice 1527, 1560
- Bet El (seliḥot and morning service), Abraham Ḥamwi: Livorno 1878 (repr. New York 1982)
- Bet Din (Rosh Hashanah), Abraham Ḥamwi: Livorno 1878 (repr. Jerusalem 1986)
- Bet ha-Kapporet (Kippur), Abraham Ḥamwi: Livorno 1879
- Bet Menuha (Shabbat), Abraham Ḥamwi: Livorno 1878
- Bet Oved (Daily), Abraham Ḥamwi: Livorno 1878
- Bet Simḥah (Sukkot), Abraham Ḥamwi: Livorno 1879 (repr. Jerusalem 1970)
- Bet ha-Beḥirah (Pesaḥ), Abraham Ḥamwi: Livorno 1880 (repr. Jerusalem 1985)
- Seder Olat Tamid (minḥah and arbit only): Aleppo 1907 (reflecting the "Musta'arabi" text)
- Olat ha-Shaḥar: Aleppo 1915 (reflecting the "Sephardic" text)

Some reprints of the originals are available today, and many Siddurim today, especially the Magen Abraham series are heavily influenced by the Livorno prayer books.

==== Modern ====
- Seder Seliḥot, ed. Shehebar: Jerusalem 1973
- Bet Yosef ve-Ohel Abraham: Jerusalem, Manṣur (Hebrew only, based on Baghdadi text) 1974–1980
- Siddur le-Tish'ah be-Ab, ed. Shehebar: Jerusalem 1976
- Mahzor Shelom Yerushalayim, ed. Albeg: New York, Sephardic Heritage Foundation 1982
- Siddur Kol Mordechai, ed. Faham bros: Jerusalem 1984 (minḥah and arbit only)
- Sha'are Ratson, ed. Moshe Cohen: Tel Aviv 1988, repr. 2003 (High Holy Days only)
- Kol Yaakob, ed. Alouf: New York, Sephardic Heritage Foundation 1990 (Hebrew only; revised edition 1996, Hebrew and English; a new edition is in preparation)
- The Aram Soba Siddur: According to the Sephardic Custom of Aleppo Syria, Moshe Antebi: Jerusalem, Aram Soba Foundation 1993 (minḥah and arbit only)
- Orḥot Ḥayim, ed. Yedid: Jerusalem 1995 (Hebrew only)
- Orot Sephardic Siddur, Eliezer Toledano: Lakewood, NJ, Orot Inc. (Hebrew and English: Baghdadi text, Syrian variants shown in square brackets)
- Siddur Abodat Haleb / Prayers from the Heart, Moshe Antebi, Lakewood, NJ: Israel Book Shop, 2002
- Abir Yaakob, ed. Haber: Sephardic Press (Hebrew and English, Shabbat only)
- Siddur Ve-ha'arev Na, ed. Isaac S.D. Sassoon, 2007
