= Moses Edrehi =

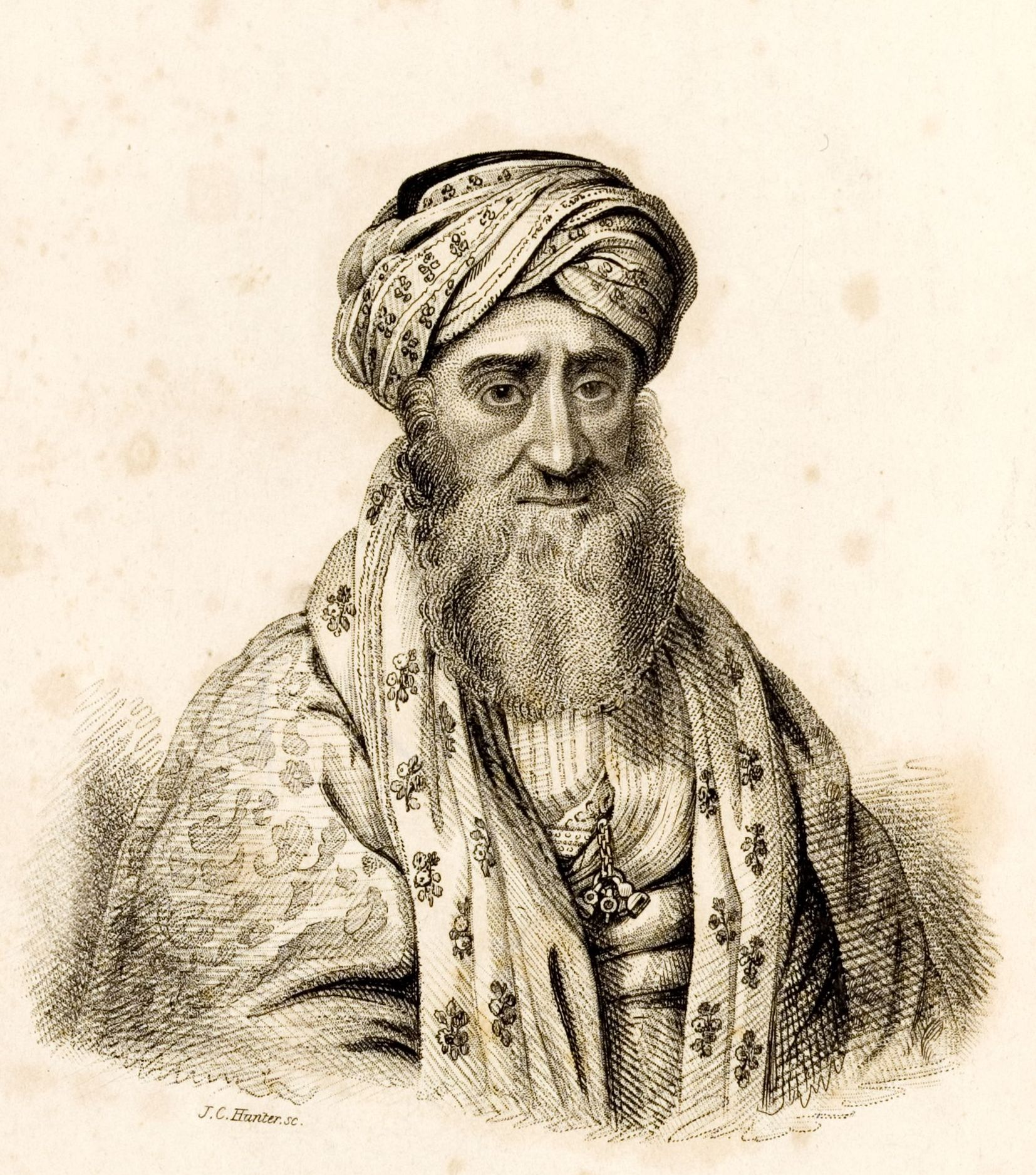
- Born: c. 1774; Agadir, Morocco
- Died: c. 1842; Jerusalem or London
- Writing career
- Language: Hebrew

Signature
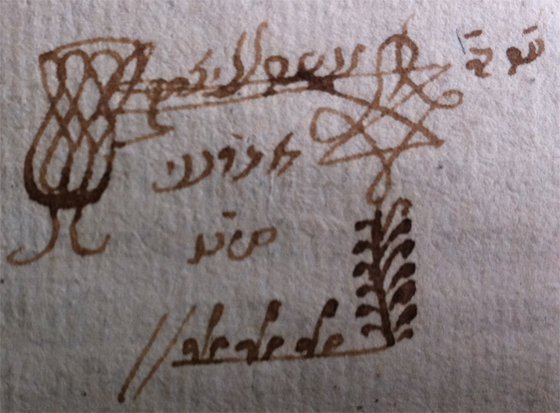

Moses ben Isaac Edrehi (Hebrew: משה בן יצחק אדרעי; c. 1774–c. 1842) Moroccan-born cabalist and teacher of modern and Oriental languages. He resided mainly in Amsterdam and in England.

== Biography ==
Moses Edrehi was born to a Moroccan Jewish family in Agadir. At an early age, when the Jews were expelled from that city, his family relocated to Mogador, and after 1784 to Rabat. At the age of fourteen he began preaching in the city of Meknes.

He arrived in London in 1791, studying there at the Sephardi beth midrash Etz Ḥayyim. He also lived for some time in Amsterdam. Edrehi eventually left for the Land of Israel, via France, Italy, Malta, and Turkey.

Edrehi was a firm believer in the existence somewhere in western Asia of the Ten Lost Tribes, and was known for his eccentric character and manner of speech. In June 1829 there appeared in Blackwood's Magazine one of Christopher North's Noctes Ambrosianae, devoted in large measure to his peculiarities.

== Bibliography ==
- Torat Ḥayyim [The Law of Life] (in Hebrew). London. 1792.
- Yad Mosheh [The Hand of Moses] (in Hebrew). Amsterdam: Bi-defus almanah ṿi-yetome Yosef Props ... 1809. hdl:2027/nnc1.cu58951628.
- Ma'aseh Nissim [The Book of Miracles] (in Hebrew and German). Amsterdam. 1818. (German Version in Hebrew characters) English translation published in London, 1834.
- An Historical Account of the Ten Tribes, Settled Beyond the River Sambatyon in the East. London: s.n. 1836. hdl:2027/uva.x000592063.
- History of the Capital of Asia and the Turks, together with an Account of the Domestic Manners of the Turks in Turkey. Vol. I–III. Boston. 1855.
