= Chaim Shaul Abud =

Israeli poet, rabbi, educator, and philanthropist

- חיים שאול עבוד
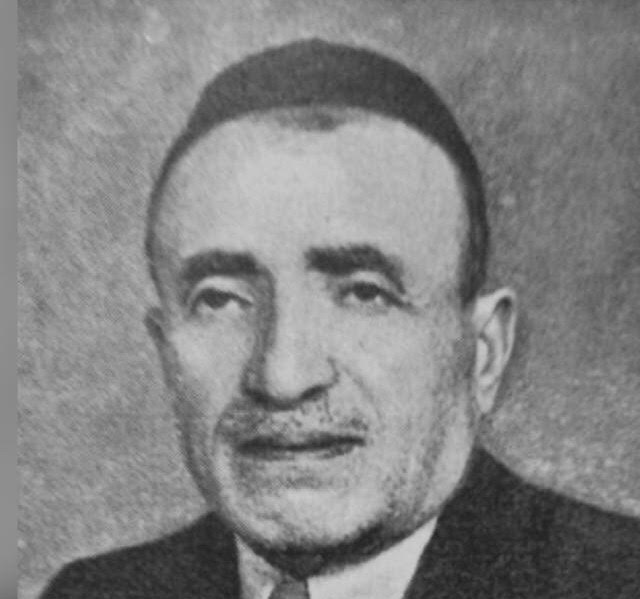
- Born: 1890; Aleppo, Ottoman Empire (now Syria)
- Died: 7 June 1977; Jerusalem, Israel
- Occupation(s): Rabbi, poet, religious scholar

Chaim Shaul Abud (Hebrew: חיים שאול עבוד; 1890–1977) was an Israeli poet, rabbi, educator, and philanthropist. Abud was the author of the book "Shirayi Zimra Ha-Shalem", which combines the poetry of Baqashot form the Jewish community of Aleppo (halab or aram tzoba) and songs that he wrote himself. He also served as founder and director of several Torah schools in Jerusalem.

== Early life and education ==
Abud was born in Aleppo, Syria, to a family of rabbis, his father Rabbi Avraham Abud, and his grandfather Rabbi Eliyahu Abud. In his youth, he studied the Torah, Halakhha, and poetry of Baqashot, among the rabbis of Aleppo.

== Career ==
In 1907, he relocated to Buenos Aires to serve as a cantor (Hazzan) and a school teacher in the Jewish community of the city. In 1929 he came and settled in Jerusalem and founded the Talmud Torah "Nezer Aharon" in the city. He also established and managed a fund loan for the residents of Jerusalem and supported financially at Yeshivat Porat Yosef in the city.

=== Baqashot ===
He was greatly influenced by Arab maqam music and he wrote lyrics Arabic melodies. These melodies were assimilated in the melodies of prayer among the Sephardi Jews. Wrote piyyut and gathered the poetry of Baqashot to a book "Shirayi Zimra Ha-Shalem" and was one of the founders of the shirat h- Baqashot custom on shabbat in Jerusalem.

Rabbi abud taught maqam and piyyut on a volunteer basis until old age. The most famous of his students is Rabbi Ovadia Yosef among others the cantors Moshe Habusha and Yehiel Nahari.

== Personal life ==
Abud and his wife, Leah, had 12 children. He died in Jerusalem on 7 June 1977. After his death, the Jerusalem City Council decided to honor his memory and named the street where he lived in his name.
