= Central Synagogue of Aleppo =

Former synagogue in Aleppo, Syria

- Hebrew: בית הכנסת המרכזי בחאלֶבּ; Arabic: كنيس حلب المركزي
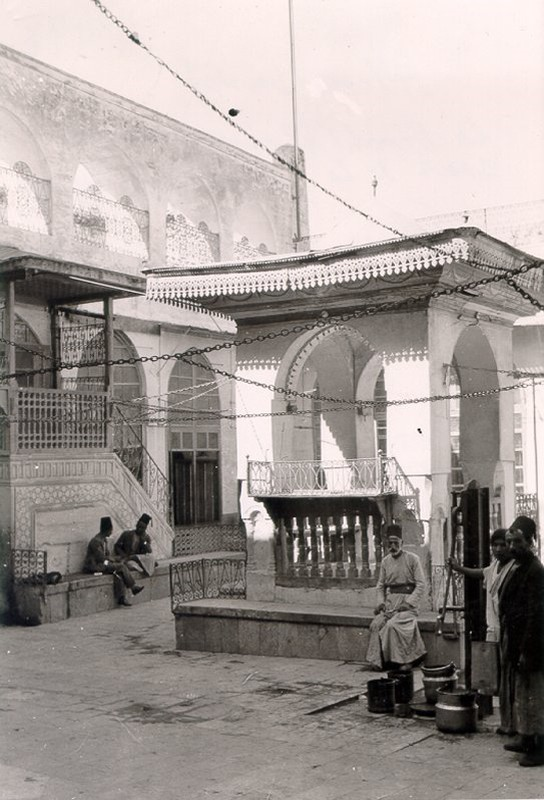
- The former synagogue, in the 1940s

- Location of the former synagogue in Aleppo

Religion
- Affiliation: Judaism (former)
- Rite: Nusach Sefard; Musta'arabi
- Ecclesiastical or organizational status: Synagogue; Archaeological site
- Status: Inactive; Ruins

Location
- Location: Aleppo, Al-Farafira
- Country: Syria
- Interactive map of Central Synagogue of Aleppo
- Coordinates: 36°12′11″N 37°09′27″E

Architecture
- Type: Synagogue architecture
- Style: Byzantine
- Completed: c. 9th century

The Central Synagogue of Aleppo, (Hebrew: בית הכנסת המרכזי בחאלֶבּ, Arabic: كنيس حلب المركزي, romanized: Kanīs Ḥalab al-Markazī), also known as the Great Synagogue of Aleppo, Joab's Synagogue, al-Safra, or Al-Bandara Synagogue (Arabic: كنيس البندرة), is a former Jewish place of worship possibly dating to the 5th century CE in Aleppo, Syria.

It was the primary synagogue of the Syrian Jewish community while in use. The synagogue was notable for being the location of the Aleppo Codex for over five hundred years until it was removed and taken to Israel following the 1947 Aleppo pogrom, during which the synagogue was burned. The synagogue was rebuilt from its ruins in 1992, but later damaged again between 2011 and 2015 during the Syrian Civil War. The Sephardic Heritage Museum has been in the process of reconstructing the synagogue since 2016.

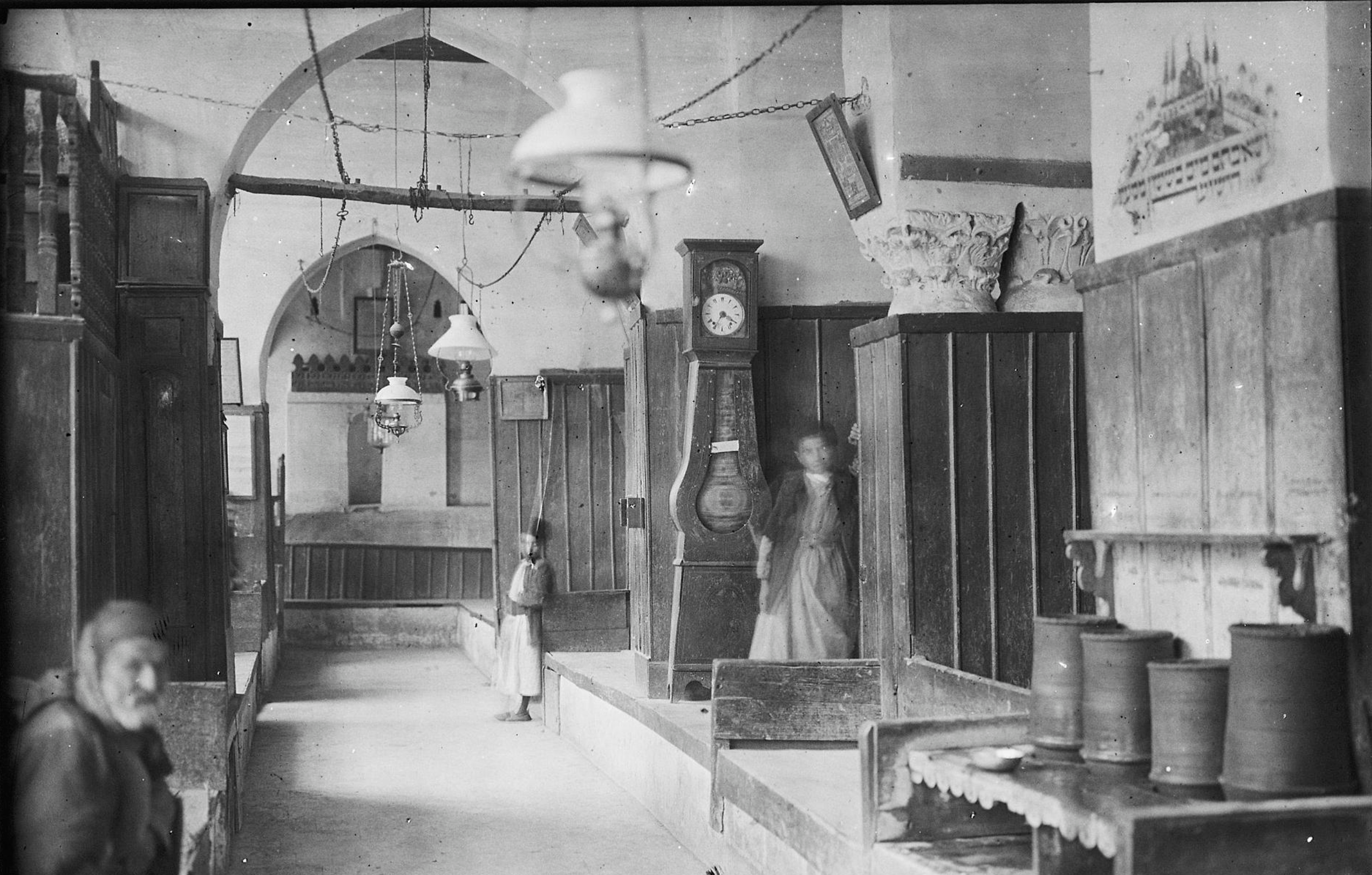
A photograph of the interior of the Western wing of the synagogue in the early 20th century

== History ==
According to David Sutton, Jews traditionally believed that the foundation for the Great Synagogue in Aleppo was constructed by King David's general, Yoab ben Seruyah, after his conquest of the city, then known as Aram Soba. It is still sometimes referred to as Joab's Synagogue.

The western wing, the oldest section of the synagogue, dates to the fifth or sixth century. The oldest surviving inscription is from the year 834 CE. During the Mongol invasion of Aleppo in 1260, the synagogue was one of six designated safe havens. Despite this, it was destroyed during another Mongol invasion in 1400 led by Tamerlane. The rebuilding of the synagogue began in 1405 and was completed in 1418. To avoid attracting unwanted attention, the synagogue was significantly scaled down.

In 1516, Syria came under Ottoman rule and experienced a period of major economic growth, which resulted in a steady emigration of Spanish Jews to Syria. To accommodate the growing number of attendees, an additional wing was constructed on the east side of the building as a space for new arrivals to participate in their unique ritual activities. The synagogue was again renovated in 1855, reflecting the community's pride in its beauty.

With the arrival of Sephardim in the 16th century, an eastern wing of the courtyard was built. On its southern part, facing Jerusalem, was the “cave of Elijah.” A raised, covered tevah stood within the porticoed courtyard and was used seasonally in the summer. This layout remained essentially unchanged until it was looted and burned in the riots of 1947.

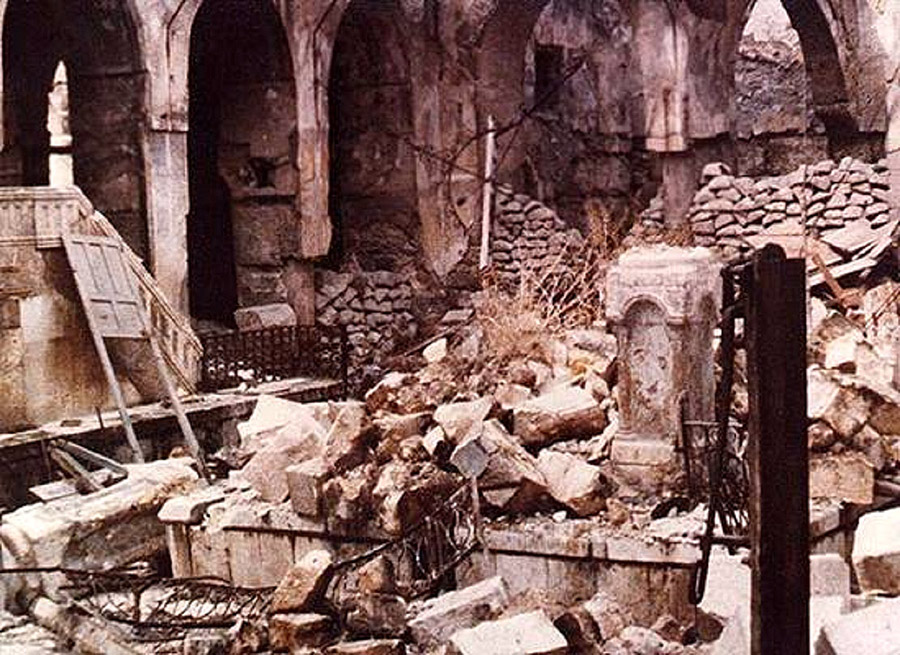
The synagogue after being burned in the riots of 1947

The synagogue underwent several modifications until its destruction during the 1947 Aleppo pogrom. It lay in ruins until 1990, when the Syrian Jewish community of New York funded a reconstruction effort, completed in 1992. Despite being rebuilt, the synagogue remained abandoned due to the absence of Jews in Aleppo following the 1947 exodus. It was subsequently placed under the jurisdiction of the Syrian government.

During the Syrian Civil War, the building was damaged again between 2011 and 2015, under unclear circumstances. Restoration efforts led by the Sephardic Heritage Museum began in 2016, but the synagogue suffered additional damage during the 2023 Turkey–Syria earthquakes. Restoration is ongoing.

== Architecture and layout ==
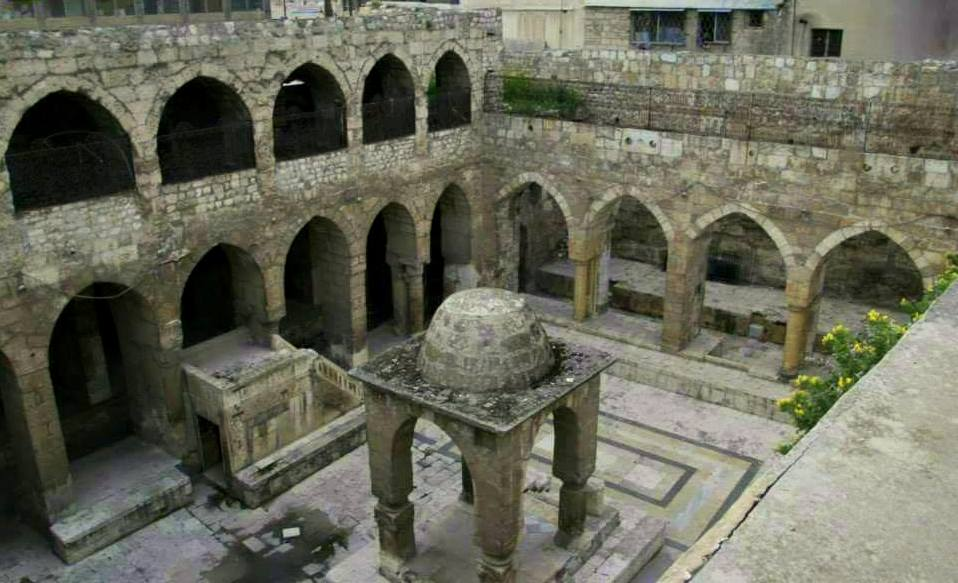
The courtyard of the synagogue and its outdoor Tevah in 2011

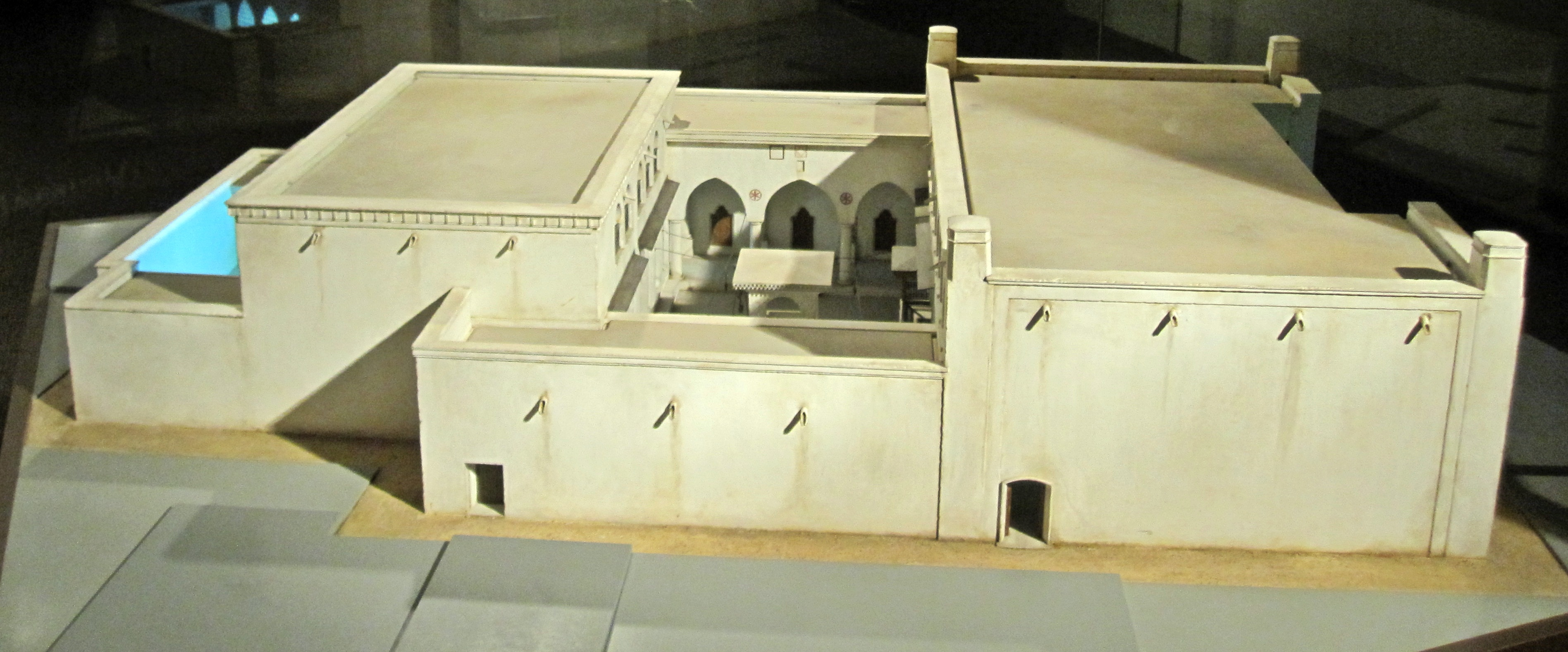
Model of the synagogue in The Museum of the Jewish People at Beit Hatfutsot

The synagogue consisted of three main sections: a western prayer hall, a central courtyard, and an eastern wing added in the 19th century. There was a tevah in each section and seven hechalot (Holy Arks) throughout the complex. After the Mongol destruction, it was rebuilt in stages. As the community expanded, smaller chapels were added, one containing the synagogue's genizah.

The western prayer hall was divided into three aisles by rows of columns. Its western wall had seven windows of different designs. At the center was a carved wooden indoor tevah with six steps. The Middle Ark and the Ark of Moses were located on the southern end, facing Jerusalem. The eastern aisle was converted into an entrance hall with the Sealed Ark at its southern end, and above it was the women's gallery.

The central courtyard served as an open-air sanctuary in pleasant weather. At its center stood an outdoor tevah supported by four columns and topped by a dome. The western wall held the Ark of Tekiah, where the shofar was sounded; nine steps led to an upper platform used for circumcision ceremonies. Against the southern wall stood the Summer Ark, flanked by semicircular hekhalot. A beth midrash (study room) occupied the north side of the courtyard.

The eastern midrash, built for Sephardic Jews in the 1400s, contained a modern study wing and a prayer space divided into two aisles. Another wooden tevah stood in its center. At its southern end were the Ark of the Sephardic Jews and the enclosed Cave of Elijah, where the Aleppo Codex was kept while in the synagogue.

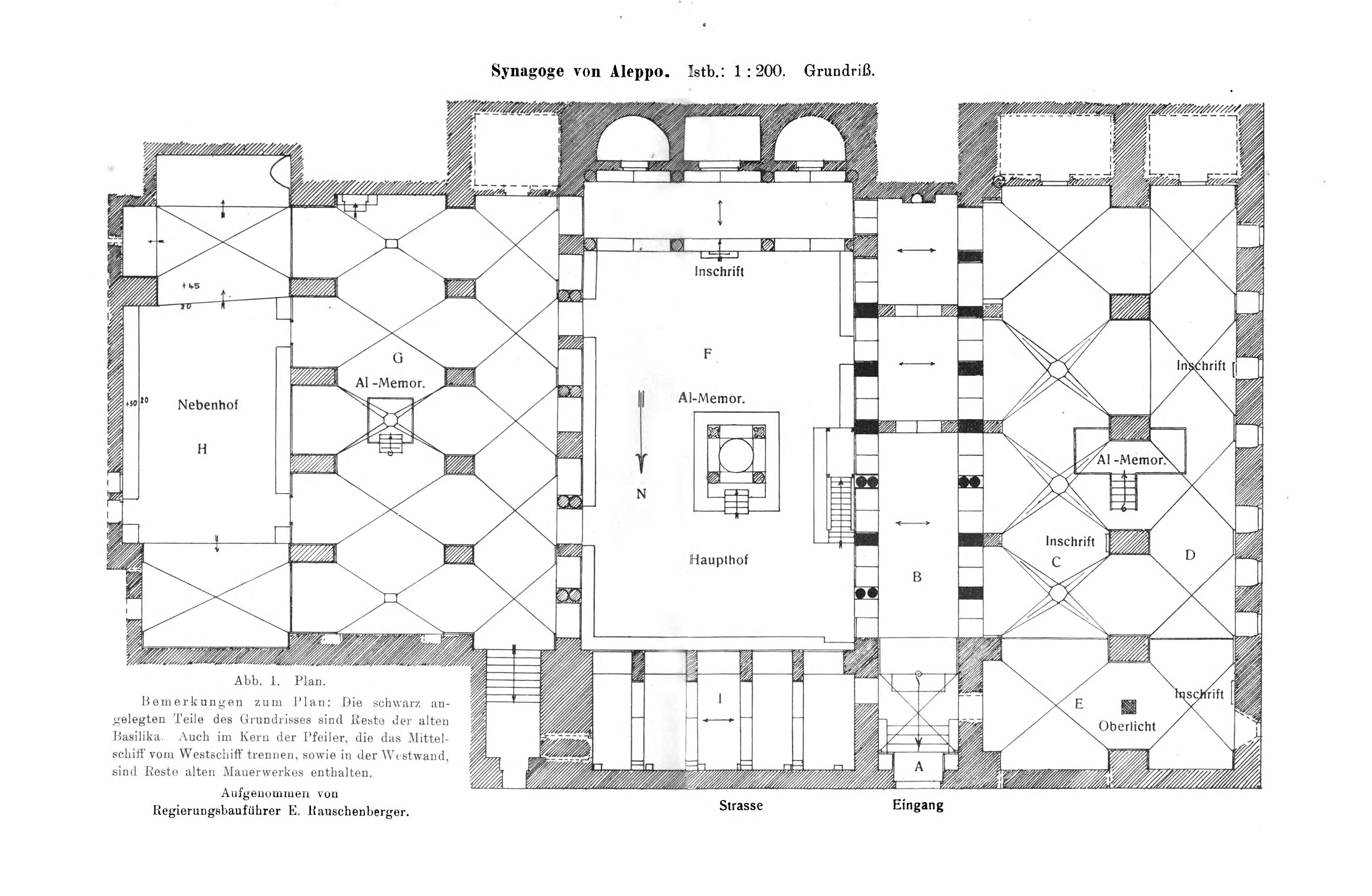
Architectural floor plan of the synagogue.

== See also ==
- Ades Synagogue
- History of the Jews in Syria
- Syrian Jews
