= Musta'arabi Jews =

Arabic-speaking pre-Sephardic Jewish communities of the Middle East

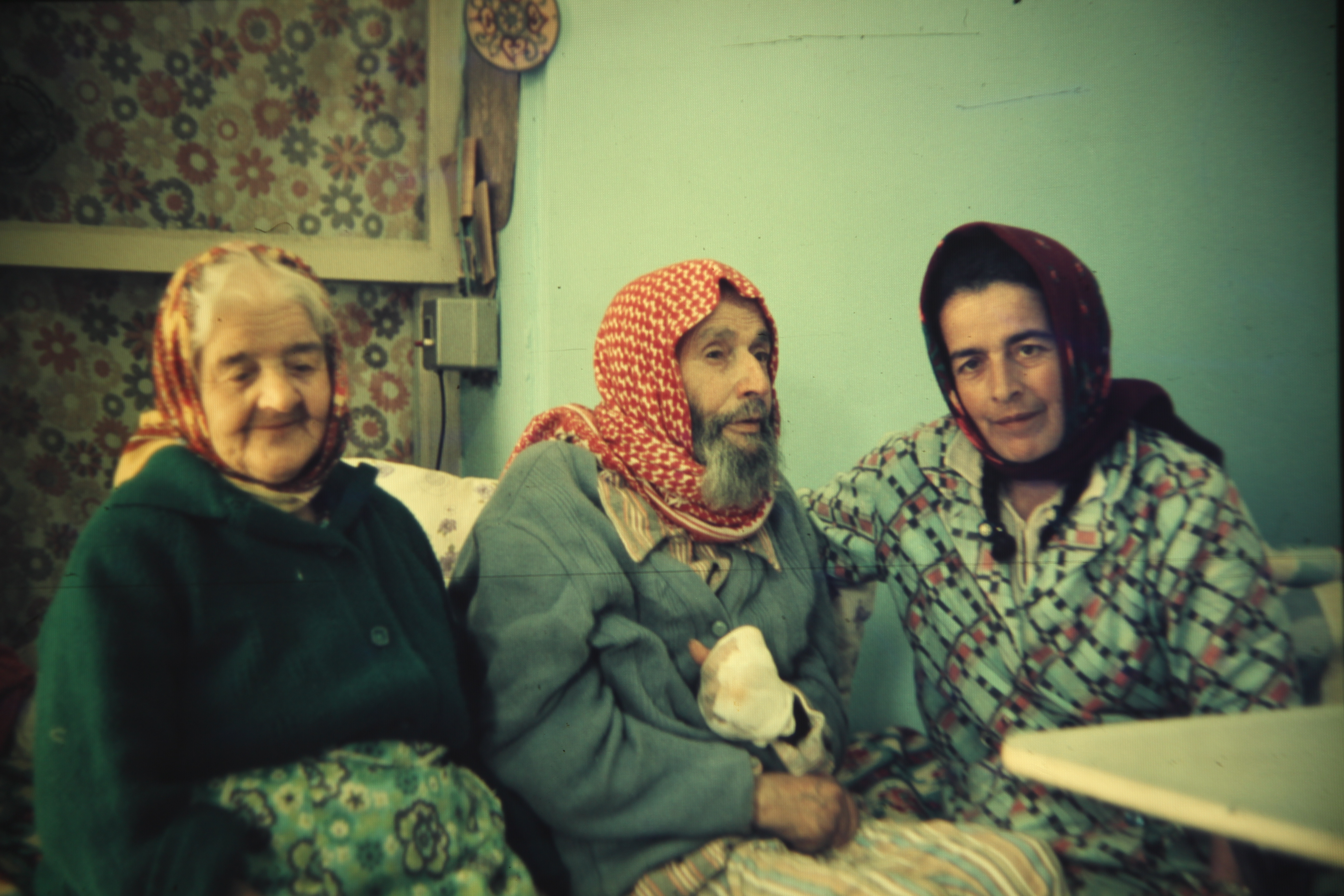
Musta'arabi Jews in Peki'in, Israel. Margalit Zinati, on the far right, is known as the "keeper of the Jewish embers in Peki'in", as she is the only Jew remaining in the town to this day

Musta'arabi Jews (Arabic: المستعربين al-Mustaʿribīn "Mozarabs"; Hebrew: מוּסְתערבים Mustaʿravim) were Arabic-speaking Jews (often with their own Judeo-Arabic varieties) who lived in the Middle East and North Africa (MENA) prior to the arrival and integration of the Sephardic Jews.

Following the expulsion of Jews from Spain in 1492 and the persecution of Jews and Muslims by Manuel I of Portugal in 1497, Sephardic exiles moved into more hospitable regions of the Mediterranean Basin, and many settled among the Musta'arabim in MENA countries. They quickly developed a koineised Judeo-Spanish that they used amongst themselves.

In many Arabic-speaking countries, Sephardim and the existing Musta'arabim maintained separate synagogues and religious rituals, but often shared a Chief Rabbi. However, the communities generally amalgamated halakhic norms, adopting mostly the nusach (liturgy) of the Sephardim (not to be confused with the much later Nusach Sefard, an Ashkenazi rite of Orthodox Judaism). This pattern was found in most Musta'arabi communities. A typical example is in the Syrian Jewish community, although the adoption of the Sefardic nusach by Yemenite Jews was due to the writings of Maimonides and, later, aggressive missionary work by Sefardic rabbis.

In contrast, in Tunisia, there was a strong and enduring social distinction between the Touansa, the established communities of Mustaʿaravim and early Sefardic exiles, and the later Grana, who were later Sefardic Livornese immigrants who had a distinctly European self-identity.

== Background ==
The word "Mustaʿrabi" itself, and its Hebrew equivalent mistaʿrevim, meaning "those who live among the Arabs", are derived from the Arabic مستعرب mustaʿrib, meaning “arabized”. Compare with the term "Mozarab" (mozárabe in Spanish, borrowed from Arabic) to refer to Arabized (but not Islamized) Christian Spaniards in Arab ruled Islamic Spain. "Musta'arabi" was also used by medieval Jewish authors to refer to Jews in North Africa, in what would become the modern states of Morocco, Algeria, Tunisia, Libya and Egypt (which also underwent cultural and linguistic Arabization following the Muslim conquest there).

Following the Muslim conquest of the Levant, Syria and the surrounding region was brought under Arab rule in the first half of the seventh century, and the Jews of the land, like the Christian majority at that time, became culturally Arabized, adopting many of the ways of the new foreign elite minority rulers, including the language.

Musta'arabim, in the Arabized Hebrew of the day, was used to refer to Arabic-speaking Jews native to the region of Syria who were, "like Arabs" or "culturally Arabic-oriented". These Musta'arabim were also called Murishkes or Moriscos by the Sephardi immigrants. This may be either a corruption of "Mashriqis" (Easterners) or a Ladino word meaning "like Moors" or "Moorish" (compare with the Spanish word Morisco).

== In the Land of Israel ==
The Musta'arabi Jews in the Land of Israel constituted one of the three main components of the Old Yishuv (Jewish community of Eretz Yisrael), together with the Sephardi Jews, and Ashkenazi Jews.

The Musta'arabi Jews in the Land of Israel were descendants of the ancient Hebrews who never left the Land of Israel, instead remaining there through the destruction of the Second Temple in 70 AD to the First Aliyah in 1881, prior to the onset of Zionist immigration. In the sixteenth century, Musta'arabi Jews were noted as performing agricultural work, as in the ancient periods of Israel. Under the rule of the Ottoman Empire in the mid-16th century, there were no more than 10,000 Jews divided between numerous groups of congregations in all of Ottoman Palestine. Within the Jewish community at this time, there was some conflict between the Musta'arabim and Jews who had immigrated to Israel from Spain and Sicily. Later on, there was also conflict between Jewish citizens of the Ottoman Empire and those who held foreign passports (the so-called Francos or Señores Francos). From 1839 onward, Jewish subjects of the Ottoman Empire, including the Musta'arabim, were represented by a locally nominated rabbi, whose appointment to serve as a hakham bashi or "chief rabbi" required approval from the Ottoman authorities. This hierarchical system paralleled one previously established for Christian bishops in the empire.

Due to the persecution of the rural Jewish population since the Islamic period into the Crusader, Mamluk and Ottoman periods, the Musta'arabim decreased from a majority of the Galilee's population to its smallest minority.. In many of them, there were indigenous Jewish villagers until the Ottoman period, including Peki'in, Shefar'am, and possibly Alma and Kfar Hananiah. In the village of Peki'in, the Musta'arabi presence survives to the present day, although the Jewish residents were forced to evacuate their ancestral homes during the 1936–1939 Arab revolt. The majority relocated to Hadera, where their descendants primarily reside today, though a small number eventually returned to Peki'in. The synagogues and cemeteries of Musta'arabi Jews, as in Peki'in, are considered the oldest in the Jewish world and can be dated largely to the Talmudic period but also to Mishnaic and Second Temple period.

=== Roman and Byzantine era ===
In late Roman Palestine, the vast majority of those indigenous Jews who would come to be known as Musta'arabim lived in small villages, especially in the north or Galilee, but also many around Jerusalem, and even toward Ramallah. They suffered extreme oppression and frequent massacres under the Byzantines. They continued to speak Aramaic, but many were illiterate.

=== Crusades ===
The Jews in Palestine defended against the Crusaders with Arabs, especially at Haifa in 1100. Many were massacred or captured during the Siege of Jerusalem (1099) to the Crusaders. At Ashkelon, 1191, many Jews were forced out by the crusaders, with some moving to Jerusalem.

=== Mamluks ===
During the Mamluk period, the Jews generally saw a decline in status and demographics. Jews started to move out of small villages and into larger ones such as:

- Peki'in
- Safed
- Tiberias
- Jerusalem
- Hebron
- Haifa
- Akko

Safed, Tiberias, and the area that surrounds them saw an increase in population, in 1500 it is estimated that over 10,000 Jews were living in the Safed Region. Jews started to move towards etrog exportation and rabbinic studies.

=== Galilee revival ===
The 1492 Alhambra Decree and the 1496 decree of King Manuel I converted or expelled all Jews from Iberia. Many of these settled in the two main cities of the Galilee, Safed and Tiberias; notable Jewish scholars such as Yosef Caro settled in Eretz Yisrael. This had two major outcomes: the adoption of Sephardic practices, and the start of a golden age of Jewish life in Palestine. This golden age happened almost exclusively in the Four Holy Cities: Jerusalem, Safed, Tiberias, and Hebron. Along with the Musta'arabim adopting some Sephardic practices, they also intermarried extensively with the Sephardim. In some respects, the Musta'arabim in the four holy cities ceased being a distinct group; only in rural areas such as Peki'in did the Musta'arabi Jews remain dominant.

=== Ottoman era ===
In the Ottoman era, the main Jewish population center moved away from the Galilee and towards Jerusalem. Still, the Ladino-speaking Jews dominated Jewish life. New arrivals from the Balkans, North Africa, and Iraq also cemented Sephardic traditions over those of the Musta'arabim.

=== Zionism ===
The arrival of mainly socialist and secular Zionists from Eastern Europe angered the Arab-Islamic ruling class. Relations between the Old Yishuv and the New Yishuv also suffered at times. Musta'arabim either joined sides with the Zionists, fighting in Haganah or Irgun, or left the Ottoman Empire entirely, joining the waves of Syrian Jews emigrating to America.

=== Today ===
The Musta'arabim have assimilated into mainstream Sephardic Israeli life, besides for Margalit Zinati, and it is unknown how many Israeli Jews of Musta'arabi descent there are. In America, they follow the general Syrian traditions, and have mainly settled in New York, California, and Washington.

== Syrian Musta'arabi rite ==
=== Old Aleppo rite ===
The Aleppo Musta'arabim in Syria originally had a distinct way of worship, set out in a distinct prayer book called Maḥzor Aram Soba. This ritual is thought to reflect Jerusalmite rather than Babylonian traditions in certain respects, particularly in the prominence of piyyut (see below). In a broad sense, it falls within the "Sephardi" rather than the "Ashkenazi" family of rituals, but has resemblances to non-standard Sephardi rites such as the Catalan rather than to the normative Castilian rite. It also contains some archaic features which it shares with the Siddur of Saadia Gaon and Maimonides' laws of prayer.

The following are some of the differences that stand out in the Maḥzor Aram Soba.

- The order of the Psalms in the morning service is different.
- The following prayers are worded differently (while still preserving the same message of the prayer): Baruch She’Amar, Kaddish, Kedushah, certain blessings of the Amidah, Tachanun, and the Birkat Hamazon (grace after meals).
- The Kaddish has a long set of "messianic references in the second verse" (unlike the Sephardic rite where it is much shorter and the Ashkenazic rite where it is absent).
- Psalm 8 was recited each night before the Evening Service, a practice no longer in place anywhere else.
- There was a tradition to recite 72 different verses from the Bible immediately after the Amidah of the Morning Services.
- There is a tradition, still followed by many Syrian Jews, called Alpha-Beta, which consists of reciting Psalm 119–134 before the Evening Services on Motzaei Shabbat: this also appears in the prayer book of the Spanish and Portuguese Jews.
- There was also an important tradition pertaining to the month of Elul, the month of repentance before the Days of Judgment. At dawn of Mondays, Thursdays and Saturdays, special Seliḥot prayers were recited. There were different seliḥot prayers, piyyutim, and Biblical verses to be recited for each week of that month. Syrian Jews, like other Sephardim, still recite Seliḥot during the entire month of Elul. However, the seliḥot recited by the Syrian Jews are standardized and do not vary from day to day as do the seliḥot of the Aram Soba Maḥzor.
- On Tisha B'ab, they only read Megillat Eicha at night and not in the morning: Syrian Jews still recite it before rather than after Arbit.
- The Kiddush for the three pilgrim festivals is very long, and resembles that found in the Siddur of Saadia Gaon and the Baladi Yemenite tradition.

A facsimile edition has recently been published by Yad HaRav Nissim, using pages from the best surviving copies of the 1527 edition.

=== Influence of the Sephardic rite ===
After the immigration of Jews from Spain following the expulsion, a compromise liturgy evolved containing elements from the customs of both communities, but with the Sephardic element taking an ever-larger share. One reason for this was the influence of the Shulchan Aruch, and of the Kabbalistic usages of Isaac Luria, both of which presupposed a Sephardic (and specifically Castilian) prayer text; for this reason a basically "Sephardic" type of text replaced many of the local Near and Middle Eastern rites over the course of the 16th to 19th centuries, subject to a few characteristic local customs retained in each country. (See Sephardic law and customs#Liturgy for more detail.)

In Syria, as in North African countries, there was no attempt to print a Siddur containing the actual usages of the community, as this would not generally be commercially viable. Major publishing centres, principally Livorno, and later Vienna, would produce standard "Sephardic" prayer books suitable for use in all communities, and particular communities such as the Syrians would order these in bulk, preserving any special usages by oral tradition. (For example, Ḥacham Abraham Hamaoui of Aleppo commissioned a series of prayer-books from Livorno, which were printed in 1878: these were "pan-Sephardic" in character, with some notes referring to "minhag Aram Soba".)

As details of the oral tradition faded from memory, the liturgy in use came still nearer to the "Livorno" standard. Nevertheless, a distinction persisted between the "Sephardic" rite (based on the Livorno siddurim) and the "Musta'arabi" rite (basically similar, but retaining some features derived from the older tradition).

In the early years of the twentieth century, the "Sephardic" rite was almost universal in Syria. The only exception (in Aleppo) was a "Musta'arabi" minyan at the Central Synagogue of Aleppo, but even their liturgy differed from the "Sephardic" in only a few details such as the order of the hymns on Rosh Hashanah. Some differences between the two main prayer books published in Aleppo in the early twentieth century may reflect Sephardi/Musta'arabi differences, but this is not certain: current Syrian rite prayer books are based on both books.

=== Use of piyyut ===
Approximately 30% of the Mahzor Aram Soba is composed of piyyutim.

The use of piyyutim, which was very prominent on the holidays and Shabbat, was not limited to the Syrian Musta'arabi community, but occurred in most Jewish communities. The earliest piyyutim however, were "overwhelmingly [from] [Eretz Israel] or its neighbor Syria, [because] only there was the Hebrew language sufficiently cultivated that it could be managed with stylistic correctness, and only there could it be made to speak so expressively." The earliest Palestinian prayer manuscripts, found in the Cairo Genizah, often consist of piyyutim, as these were the parts of the liturgy that required to be written down: the wording of the basic prayers was generally known by heart. The use of piyyut was always considered a Palestinian speciality: the Babylonian Geonim made every effort to discourage it and restore what they regarded as the statutory wording of the prayers, holding that "any [hazzan] who uses piyyut thereby gives evidence that he is no scholar". Accordingly, scholars classifying the liturgies of later periods usually hold that, the more a given liturgy makes use of piyyutim, the more likely it is to reflect Palestinian as opposed to Babylonian influence. This, if correct, would put the Mahzor Aram Soba firmly in the Palestinian camp. However, the piyyutim in the Mahzor Aram Soba resemble those of the Spanish school rather than the work of early Palestinian payyetanim such as Eleazar Kalir: for example, they are in strict Arabic metres and make little use of Midrash. Also, they are generally placed in a block at the beginning of the service, like today's Baqashot, rather than expanding on and partially replacing core parts of the prayers. Accordingly, the prevalence of piyut does not of itself establish a link with the old Palestinian rite, though such a link may be argued for on other grounds.

Following the dominance in Syria of the Sephardic rite, which took the Geonic disapproval of piyyut seriously, most of these piyyutim were eliminated from the prayer book. Some of them survive as pizmonim, used extra-liturgically.

=== Today ===
The Syrian Musta'arabim have completely assimilated with the Sephardic Jews and are no longer a distinct community. Certain families identify as "Sephardim" in the narrower sense, and are distinguished by their practice of lighting an extra candle on Hanukkah (This is said to be in gratitude for their acceptance by the older community. It is not shared with Sephardim in other countries).

The Musta'arabi liturgy was last recorded in official use in 1935 at the Great Synagogue of Aleppo. Its public practice ceased when Hacham Selim (Shelomo) Za'afrani, who led the final Musta'arabi minyan, left to serve as the hazzan at K'nees Silvera. Following his transition, there is no known public usage of this distinct rite in Aleppo or elsewhere. Today, the vast majority of Syrian Jews live outside of Syria—with the exception of a few individuals remaining in Damascus—and no longer distinguish between Musta'arabi and Sephardic Jews.

== See also ==
- Mizrahi Jews
- Arab Jews
- Judaeo-Arabic
- Palestinian Jews
- Syrian Jews
- Pizmonim
- Baqashot
- Central Synagogue of Aleppo
- Aleppo Codex
- Israelites
- Margalit Zinati
