= Rabbi Eleazar =

Rabbi Eleazar may refer to:

- Eleazar ben Shammua, rabbi of the 2nd century (4th generation of tannaim)
- Eleazar ben Pedat, second and third-generation amora or Talmudist from Babylon who lived in Syria Palaestina during the 3rd century
- Eleazar ben Arach, 1st-century rabbi and tanna

== See also ==
- Rabbi Eliezer, 1st/2nd-century rabbi and tanna
