= Hanna Eady =

Palestinian actor

- Born: Buqu'ya, Upper Galilee, Israel
- Education: University of Haifa, University of Wisconsin, University of Washington
- Occupations: Actor, Playwright

Hanna Eady is a Palestinian-American actor and playwright best known for co-writing Suhmata, a play about the destruction of the Palestinian Arab village of Suhmata, near Acre in northern Israel.

Eady was born in 1956 in the village of Buqu'ya in the Upper Galilee region of Israel, and took an interest in theater from an early age. He earned a B.A. in social work from the University of Haifa, and then worked as the artistic director of a theater. He then moved to the United States to study theater, earning a Bachelor of Fine Arts in theater from the University of Wisconsin and a Master of Fine Arts in drama and directing from the University of Washington in Seattle.

Eady then opened the New Image Theater Company, where he wrote and produced plays, including Seeing Double (1991) and Abraham's Land (1992). The play Suhmata, which he co-wrote with Edward Mast, depicts the 1948 destruction of a Palestinian village of that name during the 1948 Palestine war. The play debuted in Seattle in 1996.
