= Suhmata =

Suhmata سحماتا Soukhmata Sahmatah, Samueth, Samahete
- Etymology: possibly from "black"
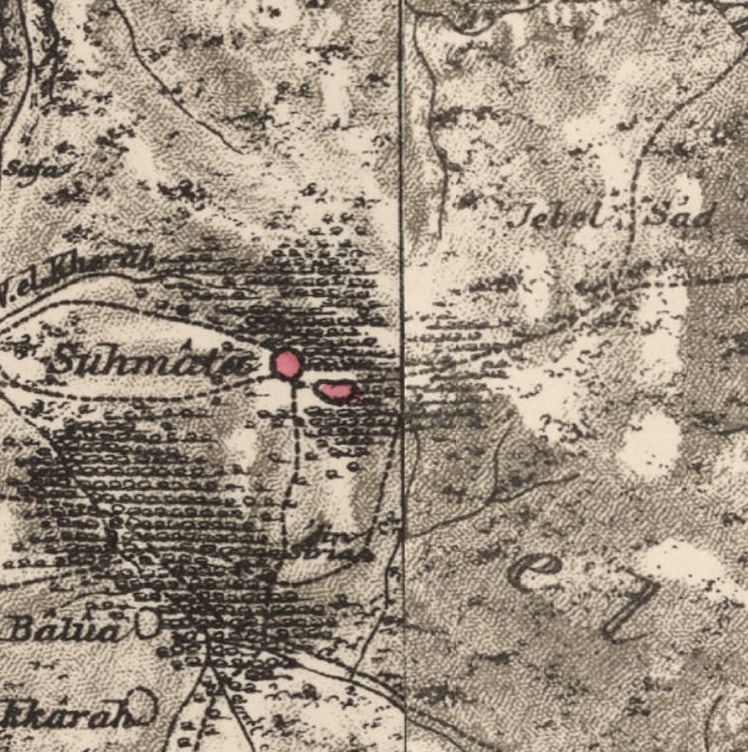
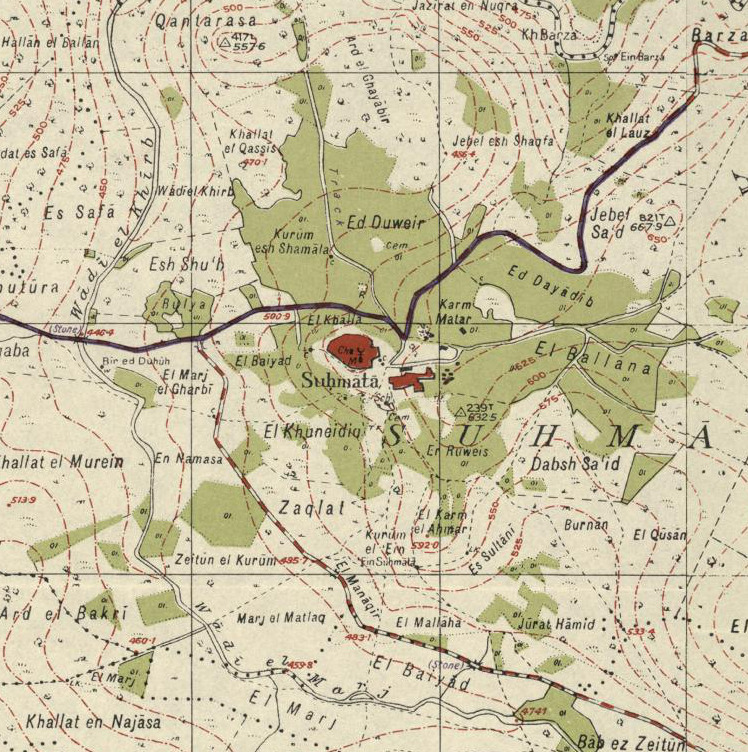
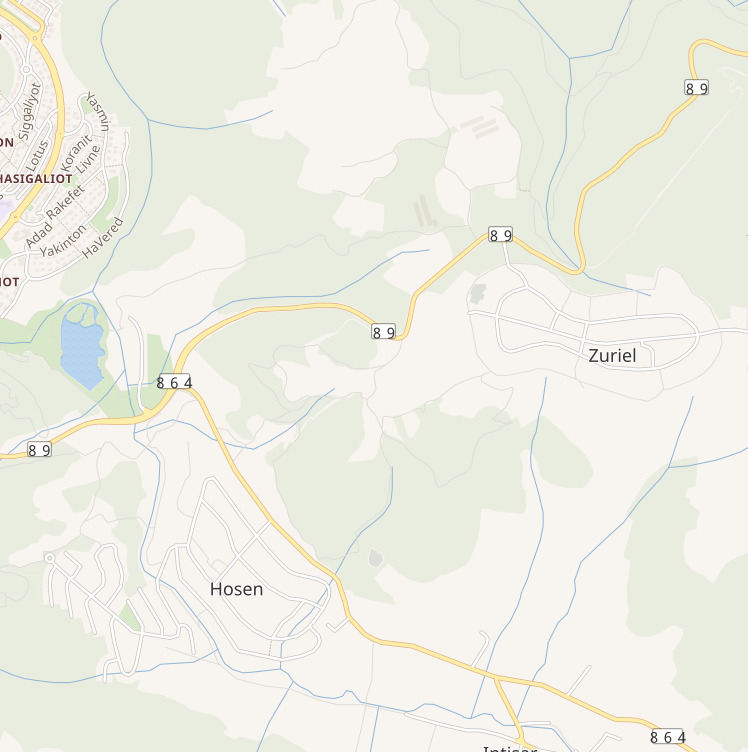
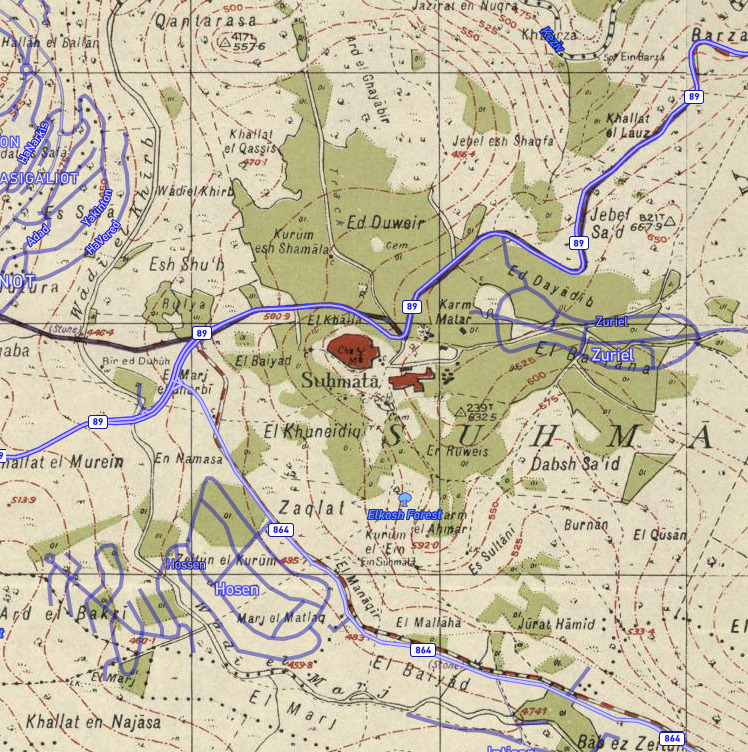
- 1870s map 1940s map modern map 1940s with modern overlay map A series of historical maps of the area around Suhmata (click the buttons)

- Location within Mandatory Palestine
- Coordinates: 33°00′19″N 35°18′14″E
- Palestine grid: 179/268
- Geopolitical entity: Mandatory Palestine
- Subdistrict: Acre
- Date of depopulation: 30 October 1948

Area
  - Total: 17,056 dunams (17.056 km^{2}; 6.585 sq mi)

Population (1945)
  - Total: 1,130
- Cause(s) of depopulation: Military assault by Yishuv forces
- Current Localities: Tzuriel, Hosen

Suhmata (Arabic: سحماتا), was a Palestinian village, located 25 kilometres (16 mi) northeast of Acre. It was depopulated by the Golani Brigade during the 1948 Arab-Israeli war.

== History ==
Separated from the neighboring village of Tarshiha by a deep gorge, the ruins of a Byzantine era church lay within Suhmata's village lands. An underground water reservoir and a burial cave that apparently dates to the Roman period have been found at the village site. Suhmata had a Christian population at least until the Persian invasion of Palestine (A.D. 614–627) and presumably many people remained Christian for some time after that. What was earlier termed a Crusader-era castle constructed in the village, which was rebuilt by Daher al-Umar in the latter half of the 18th century, turned out to be the Byzantine church. Excavations in 1932 revealed an inscription in the church's mosaic floor that dates to 555 CE.

The Crusaders referred to the village as Samueth or Samahete. In 1179, Baldwin IV confirmed the sale from Viscountess Petronella of Acre of houses, vineyards and gardens in Samueth, the village of Suphie, and some houses in Castellum Regis to Count Jocelyn III, uncle of Baldwin IV, for 4,500 bezants. However, Ronnie Ellenblum writes that it is unlikely that there was actual Frankish settlement in Suhmata at this time.

=== Ottoman era ===
Palestine was incorporated into the Ottoman Empire in 1516. In the 1548–1549 or 1596 Ottoman tax records, it was listed as 'Suhm-wata' (grid-number 178/267) and paid a tax on four olive oil presses.

Suhmata was a fortified village in the 18th century. Richard Pococke mentioned it as 'Samwata' on his visit to the area in 1737, noting it was controlled by a sheikh whose men stood guard in the surrounding country to protect it from highwaymen. Pococke sent the sheikh a letter from the English consul and was then hosted by the sheikh and his men. The sheikh sent two of his retinue to accompany Pococke on his tour of the area, accompanying him only as far as the boundaries of the sheikh's territories along the shores of the Sea of Galilee. In June 1738, this sheikh was identified in an Ottoman firman (decree) as Muhammad ibn Nafi; the firman called for the destruction of Suhmata's fortifications, along with those of Jiddin under Husayn ibn Khaliq, Tiberias under Daher al-Umar and Tarshiha (or Tarbikha) under Daher's cousin Muhammad al-Ali. Muhammad ibn Nafi and before him, his father Sheikh Nafi, were local strongmen who traditionally served as multazims (tax farmers) of Safed and the surrounding district of Jira.

In c. 1739–1740, Muhammad ibn Nafi lost control of Safed to Daher al-Umar in a negotiated surrender and not long after, surrendered Suhmata to Daher as well. The latter kept Muhammad ibn Nafi and other local families in the Safed and Jira districts, namely the Shahin and Murad, in place at least through the 1750s–1760s, as his vassals, subleasing to them the tax farms of the districts Suhmata was one of the dozen or so fortified villages under the control of Daher's son, Ali al-Daher, during his abortive rebellion against the Ottoman governor of Acre, Ahmad Pasha al-Jazzar in 1776.

In 1838, Suhmata was found to be a village with a mixed population of Christians and Muslims, located in the el-Jebel district, west of Safad.

In 1875, Victor Guérin visited Suhmata, and noted that "the village [is] divided into two distinct quarters, occupies two hills near each other, between which is a great pond (birke), partly cut in the rock and partly built. One of these hills is crowned by the remains of a fortress flanked by towers and built with simple rubble; it contained several subterranean magazines, a mosque, and various chambers. The foundation is attributed to Dhaher el Amer. It is now three parts demolished, and on the place where it stood grow vines and tobacco."

In 1881, the PEF's Survey of Western Palestine (SWP) described it as "a village, built of stone, containing about 400 Moslems, situated on [a] ridge and [the] slope of [a] hill, surrounded by figs, olives and arable land; there are several cisterns and a spring near. An elementary school for boys was founded in the village in 1886. A population list from about 1887 showed Suhmata to have about 1,500 inhabitants; 1,400 Muslims and 100 Christians.

=== British Mandate period ===
During the Mandatory Palestine, an agricultural school was established. The schools, a mosque, a church, two rain-fed irrigation pools, existed up until 1948.

In the 1922 census of Palestine conducted by the British Mandate authorities, Submata had a population of 632; 589 Muslims and 43 Melkite Christians, increasing in the 1931 census to 796; 752 Muslims and 44 Christians, in a total of 175 houses.

Over 70 percent of the village land was rocky and uncultivated, covered with oak and wild pears. The agricultural land was planted with wheat, barley, maize, tobacco, and vegetables. Suhmata's tobacco had a reputation for quality.

During the 1929 Palestine riots, residents of Suhmata attempted to attack the Jewish community of nearby Peki'in, but the village's Druze mukhtar (chief), Abdallah Saleh, intervened to protect them. Nevertheless, the threat led several Jewish families to leave Peki'in.

The residents of Suhmata participated in the 1936–1939 Arab revolt in Palestine, and in early 1938, the village police station was attacked. According to one of the guards, the station, which was manned by the constable and other Arab personnel, was suddenly stormed by dozens of armed assailants. They killed the station commander, captured the remaining officers, and later released them.

In the 1945 statistics, Suhmata had a population of 1,130; 1060 Muslims and 70 Christians, with a total of 17,056 dunams of land. Of this, a total of 3,290 dunums was allocated to cereals; 1,901 dunums were irrigated or used for orchards, while 135 dunams were built-up (urban) area.

=== Israeli period ===
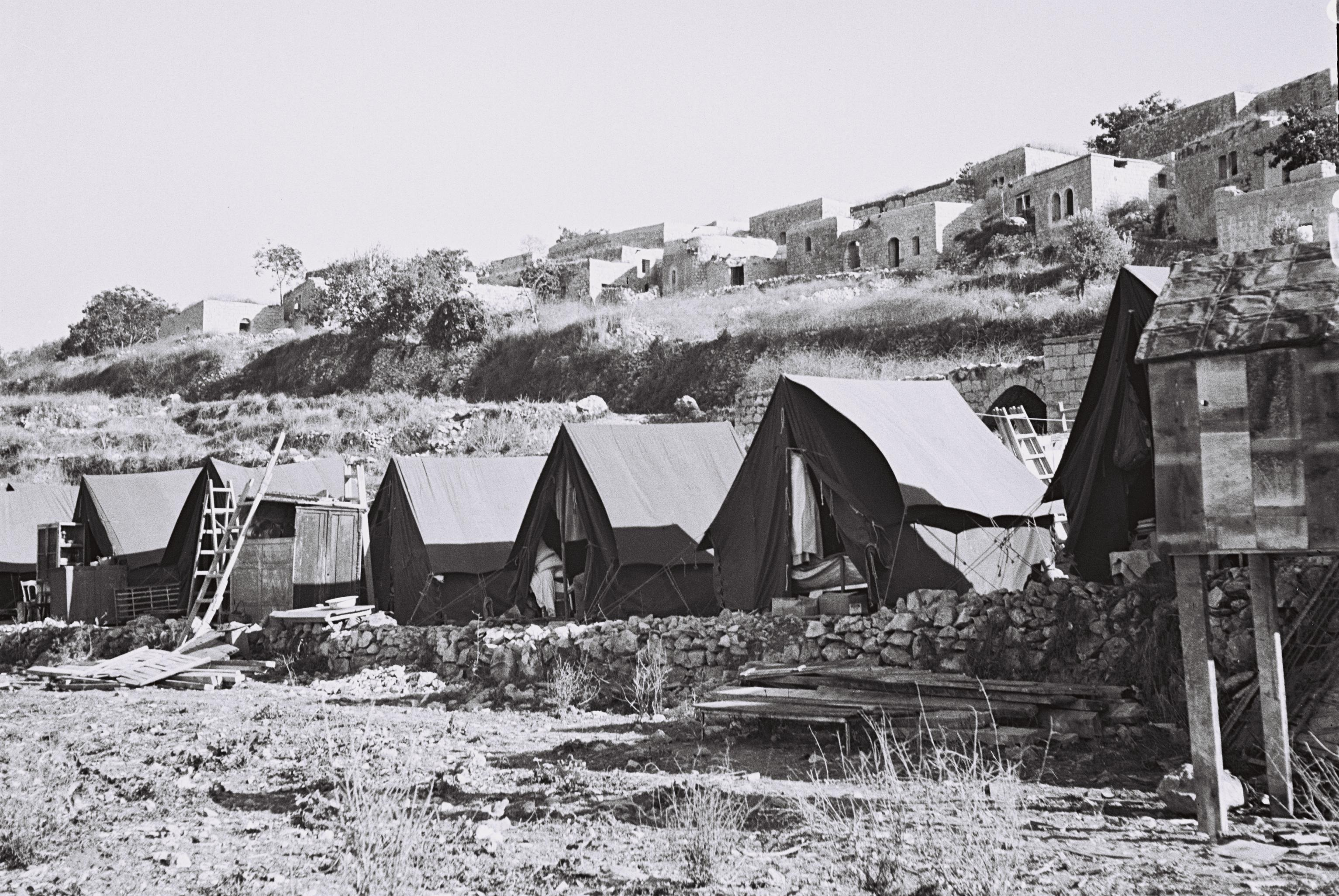
Jewish settlers at Suhmata, 1949

During Operation Hiram, on 28 October 1948, the village was bombed from the air. On 30 October, the First Battalion of Israel's Golani Brigade assaulted the village, resulting in its depopulation. The village was left in ruins.

A naming committee established by the Jewish National Fund, which operated from 1948 to 1951 until its incorporation into a Governmental Naming Committee set up by Israel, renamed Suhmata "Hosen", meaning "Strength." Meron Benvenisti writes that the committee chose this symbolic new name after determining that there was no known Jewish historical connection to the village of Suhmata.

In 1992 the village site was described: "The site is covered with debris and broken walls from fallen stone houses, all of which are scattered among the olive trees that grow there. A castle and a wall that were probably built by the Crusaders still stand. The castle is on an elevated spot on the eastern side of the site, and the wall encloses the western quarter. The surrounding lands are partly forested and partly used as pasture."

Suhmata's former inhabitants founded a village committee in 1993 which organizes volunteer efforts. The village committee also conducted a survey of the displaced population from Suhmata and their distribution inside Israel. The village was also the focus of the 1996 play Sahmatah by Hanna Eady and Ed Mast.

== See also ==
- Depopulated Palestinian locations in Israel
- List of villages depopulated during the Arab–Israeli conflict

== Bibliography ==
- Barron, J.B., ed. (1923). Palestine: Report and General Abstracts of the Census of 1922. Government of Palestine.
- Benveniśtî, M. (2000). Sacred landscape: the buried history of the Holy Land since 1948 (Illustrated ed.). University of California Press. ISBN 0-520-21154-5.
- Cohen, Amnon (1973). Palestine in the Eighteenth Century: Patterns of Government and Administration. Jerusalem: Magnes Press, Hebrew University. ISBN 1-59045-955-5.
- Conder, C.R.; Kitchener, H.H. (1881). The Survey of Western Palestine: Memoirs of the Topography, Orography, Hydrography, and Archaeology. Vol. 1. London: Committee of the Palestine Exploration Fund.
- Dauphin, C. (1998). La Palestine byzantine, Peuplement et Populations. BAR International Series 726 (in French). Vol. III : Catalogue. Oxford: Archeopress. ISBN 0-860549-05-4.
- Ellenblum, R. (2003). Frankish Rural Settlement in the Latin Kingdom of Jerusalem. Cambridge University Press. ISBN 9780521521871.
- Government of Palestine, Department of Statistics (1945). Village Statistics, April, 1945.
- Guérin, V. (1880). Description Géographique Historique et Archéologique de la Palestine (in French). Vol. 3: Galilee, pt. 2. Paris: L'Imprimerie Nationale.
- Hadawi, S. (1970). Village Statistics of 1945: A Classification of Land and Area ownership in Palestine. Palestine Liberation Organization Research Center.
- Joudah, Ahmad Hasan (2013). Revolt in Palestine in the Eighteenth Century: The Era of Shaykh Zahir al-Umar (Second ed.). Gorgias Press. ISBN 978-1-4632-0002-2.
- Khalidi, W. (1992). All That Remains: The Palestinian Villages Occupied and Depopulated by Israel in 1948. Washington D.C.: Institute for Palestine Studies. ISBN 0-88728-224-5.
- Lerer, Yoav (2008-12-18). "Zuri'el". Hadashot Arkheologiyot – Excavations and Surveys in Israel (120). Archived from the original on 2012-02-22.
- Lerer, Yoav (2009-06-21). "Suhmata, Survey Final Report". Hadashot Arkheologiyot – Excavations and Surveys in Israel (121). Archived from the original on 2012-02-22.
- Makhouli, N.; Avi-Yonah, M. (1934). "The Byzantine Church at Suhmata". Quarterly of the Department of Antiquities in Palestine. 3: 92–105.
- Mansour, Atallah (2004). Narrow Gate Churches: The Christian Presence in the Holy Land Under Muslim and Jewish Rule. Hope Publishing House. ISBN 9781932717020.
- Masalha, N.; Said, E. (2005). Catastrophe Remembered: Palestine, Israel and the Internal Refugees : Essays in Memory of Edward W. Said (1935-2003). Zed Books. ISBN 9781842776230.
- Mills, E., ed. (1932). Census of Palestine 1931. Population of Villages, Towns and Administrative Areas. Jerusalem: Government of Palestine.
- Morris, B. (2004). The Birth of the Palestinian Refugee Problem Revisited. Cambridge University Press. ISBN 0-521-00967-7.
- Palmer, E.H. (1881). The Survey of Western Palestine: Arabic and English Name Lists Collected During the Survey by Lieutenants Conder and Kitchener, R. E. Transliterated and Explained by E.H. Palmer. Committee of the Palestine Exploration Fund.
- Philipp, T. (2001). Acre: The Rise and Fall of a Palestinian City, 1730–1831. Columbia University Press. ISBN 978-0-231-50603-8.
- Pococke, R. (1745). A Description of the East, and some Other Countries. Vol. 2. London: Printed for the author, by W. Bowyer.
- Pringle, D. (1997). Secular buildings in the Crusader Kingdom of Jerusalem: an archaeological Gazetter. Cambridge University Press. ISBN 0521-46010-7.
- Rhode, H. (1979). Administration and Population of the Sancak of Safed in the Sixteenth Century. Columbia University. Archived from the original on 2016-10-10.
- Robinson, E.; Smith, E. (1856). Later Biblical Researches in Palestine and adjacent regions: A Journal of Travels in the year 1852. London: John Murray.
- Röhricht, R. (1893). (RRH) Regesta regni Hierosolymitani (MXCVII-MCCXCI) (in Latin). Berlin: Libraria Academica Wageriana.
- Schumacher, G. (1888). "Population list of the Liwa of Akka". Quarterly Statement - Palestine Exploration Fund. 20: 169–191.
- Strehlke, E., ed. (1869). Tabulae Ordinis Theutonici ex tabularii regii Berolinensis codice potissimum. Berlin: Weidmanns.
