= Peki'in Synagogue =

Former synagogue in Peki'in, Israel

- Hebrew: בית הכנסת העתיק בפקיעין
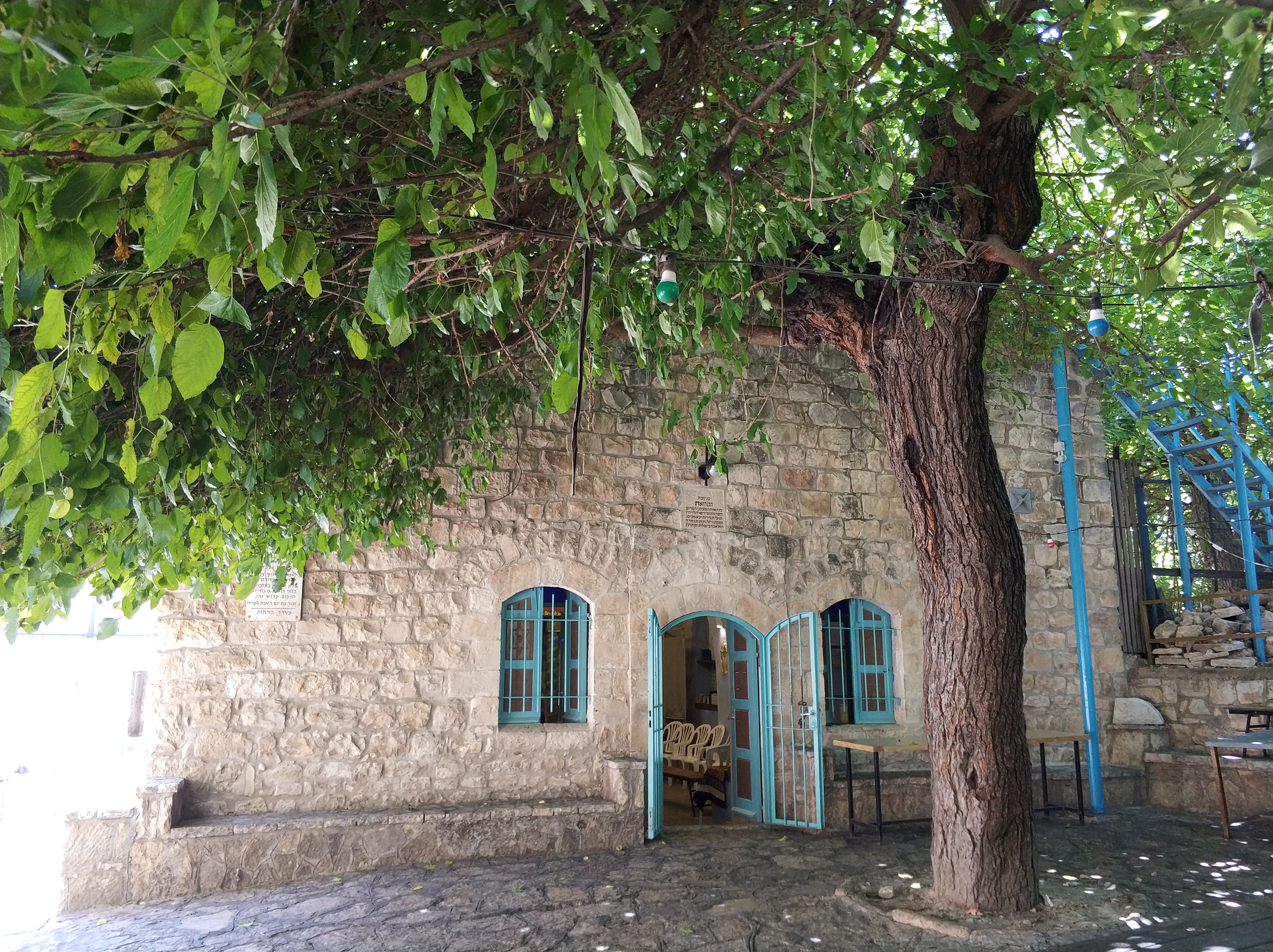
- Entrance to the former synagogue, with a large mulberry tree, in 2019

- Location of the former synagogue in the northwest part of the Northern District

Religion
- Affiliation: Judaism (former)
- Ecclesiastical or organizational status: Synagogue (1873–2005)
- Year consecrated: 1873
- Status: Inactive

Location
- Location: Peki'in, Northern District
- Country: Israel
- Interactive map of Peki'in Synagogue
- Coordinates: 32°58′39″N 35°20′08″E

Architecture
- Type: Synagogue architecture
- Funded by: Rabbi Rafael Halevy of Beirut
- Completed: 1873

Specifications
- Dome: One
- Materials: Stone

The Peki’in Synagogue (Hebrew: בית הכנסת העתיק בפקיעין, lit. 'The ancient synagogue in Peki'in'), is a former Jewish congregation and synagogue located in the centre of Peki'in, in the Northern District of Israel. The current building was erected in 1873, on the site of older ones. The site is also said to be where Rabbi Joshua ben Hananiah established his beth midrash in antiquity.

The synagogue, not usually active as of 2005, is kept by Margalit Zinati (born 1931). Zinati is a member of a Jewish family who have lived for centuries in Peki'in, reportedly since the time of the Second Temple. Zinati, the last Jewish woman in Peki'in, was honoured for her work on the 70th Independence Day in 2018, and her family home is run as a heritage site by the Education Department of the World Zionist Organization (WZO).

== History ==
=== Establishment ===
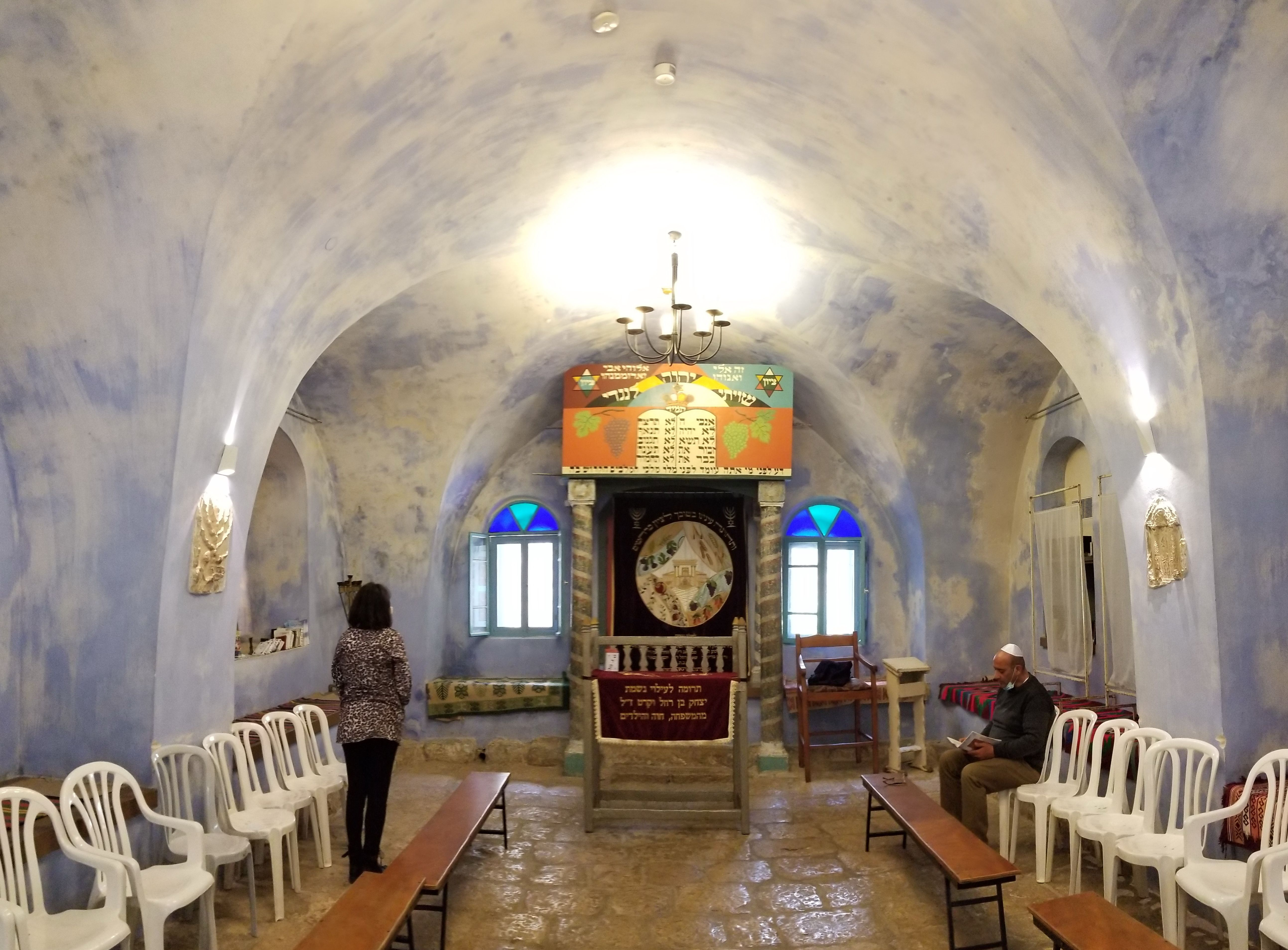
Synagogue's interior

The current structure dates from 1873, according to a commemorative plaque. This structure replaced an earlier one destroyed by an earthquake roughly three decades prior. Funding for the construction, attested to on a plaque commemorating the donation, was given by Rabbi Rafael Halevy from Beirut, possibly allowing for its completion in Nissan 30 of the year Tarlag (according to the Hebrew calendar), equivalent to April 27, 1873. It was a tall, white bricked, domed building against a blue sky.

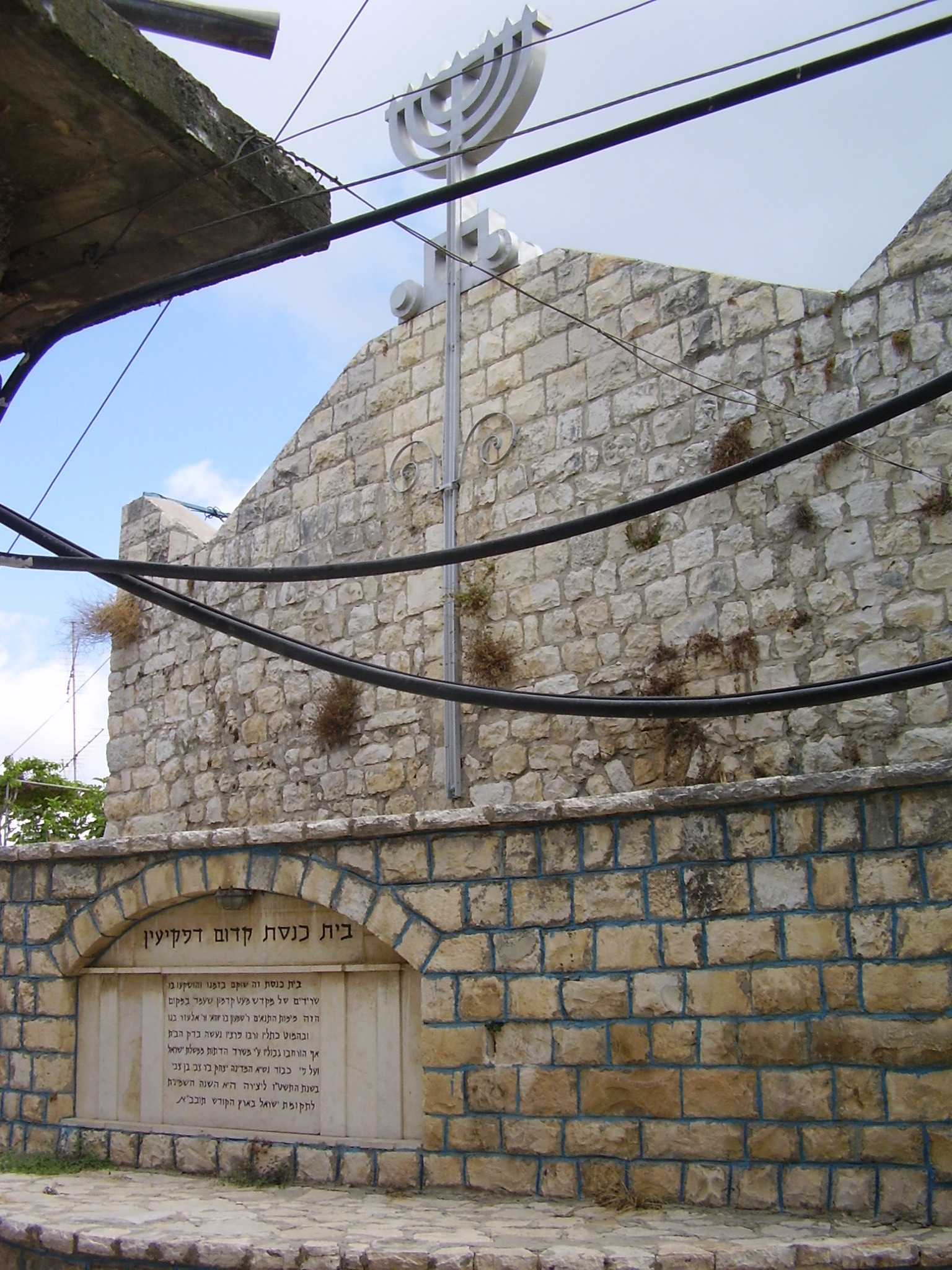
Exterior, with the temple menorah and a plaque commemorating renovations in 1955–1956

According to local tradition, the synagogue was built on the site of the beth midrash (religious school) where Rabbi Joshua ben Hananiah taught before the Bar Kokhba revolt, and Rabbi Shimon bar Yochai after it. Scholars, however, disagree on whether the cave and town known from the life story of Shimon bar Yochai can be identified with modern Peki'in.

Local elders told Ben Zvi that the present structure differs from its predecessor; the original synagogue featured a wood ceiling, whereas the current one is topped by a stone dome.

=== Later history ===
In 1921/22, Yitzhak Ben-Zvi reported that prayers were held in the synagogue on Shabbat and holidays. The synagogue housed seven kosher Torah scrolls and four that were pasul. It also functioned as a school for children.

In 1955, the Israeli Ministry of Religious Affairs renovated the building at the request of by Ben-Zvi, who was then President of Israel. The Second Series of the Israeli new shekel (NIS), put in circulation in 1999 and phased out in the 2010s, features on the 100 NIS banknote a portrait of Ben-Zvi (front), and the Peki'in synagogue along with a view of the village (back).

== Archaeological findings ==
=== Carved stones from ancient synagogue ===
In 1926 and 1930 two old stone tablets were uncovered, reused in the walls of the modern synagogue. One depicts a menorah flanked by a lulav, etrog, shofar, and incense shovel. The second one, of higher craftsmanship, depicts a Torah shrine. A third stone contains a fragmentary relief of a grapevine, found in secondary use in a modern village house. All three have been dated between the late 2nd century CE and the early 3rd. It has been suggested that the second stone may have come from another, now disappeared Galilean synagogue from Khirbet Tiriya or Tiriha. Further decorated stones believed to originate from an ancient synagogue were reused in modern buildings in Peki'in. The 2nd-3rd century date for the main three decorated stones is based on a publication by Eliezer Sukenik from 1931 and a gazetteer by F. G. Hüttenmeister from 1977.

=== Ancient inscriptions ===
In February 2017, the Council for Conservation of Heritage Sites in Israel uncovered an 1,800-year-old limestone capital. Engraved on it are two Hebrew inscriptions dating to the Roman period. The column was found upside down in the building's courtyard. According to the IAA's regional inspector, "A preliminary analysis of the engravings suggests that these are dedicatory inscriptions honoring donors to the synagogue." Uriel Rosenboym, director of Beit Zinati (the WZO Jewish heritage site), exclaimed that "No one can argue with the written artifact. There was an ancient synagogue here and the synagogue was built in its current form in recent centuries."

== Gallery ==
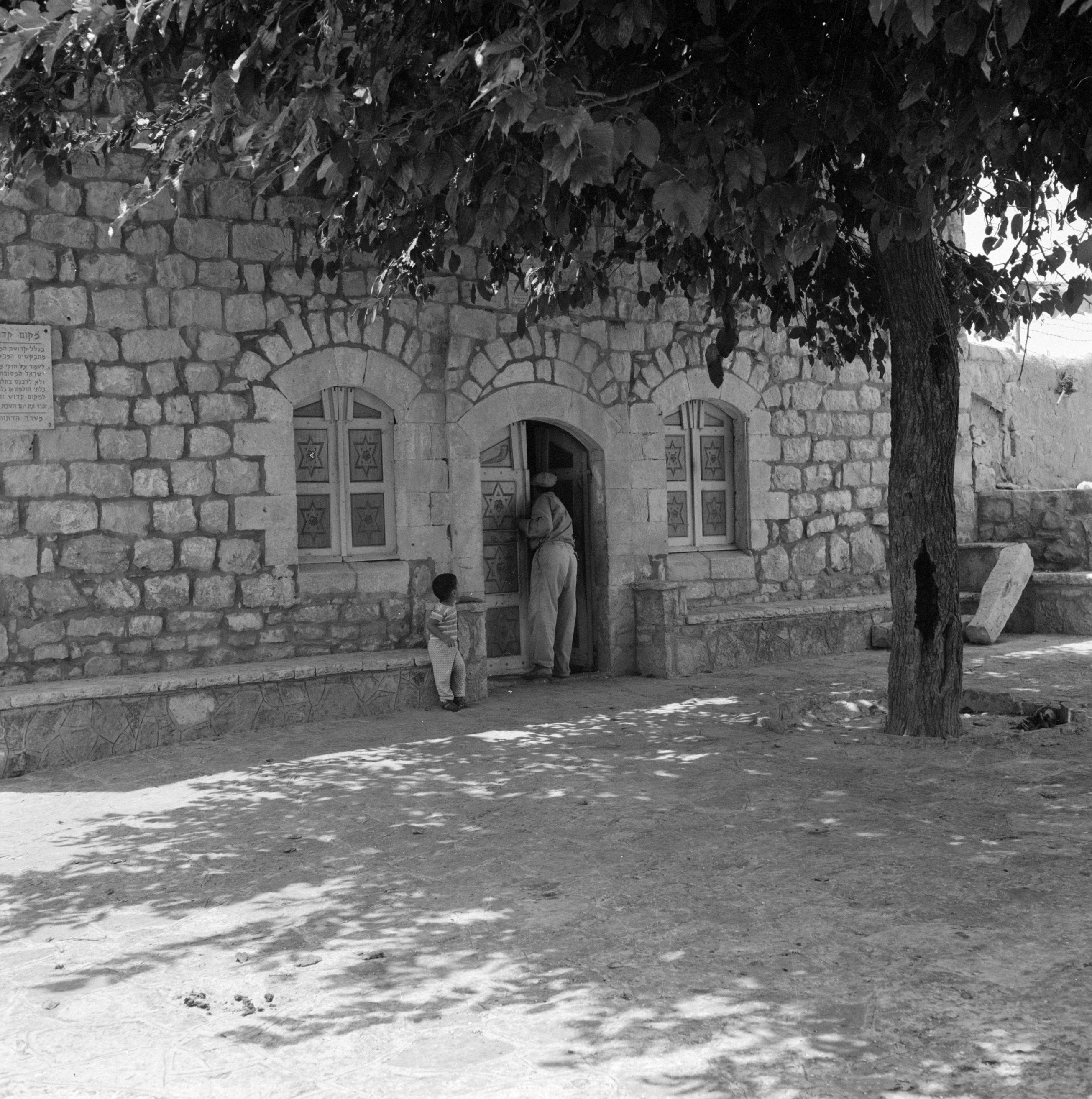
The Peki'in synagogue in 1963

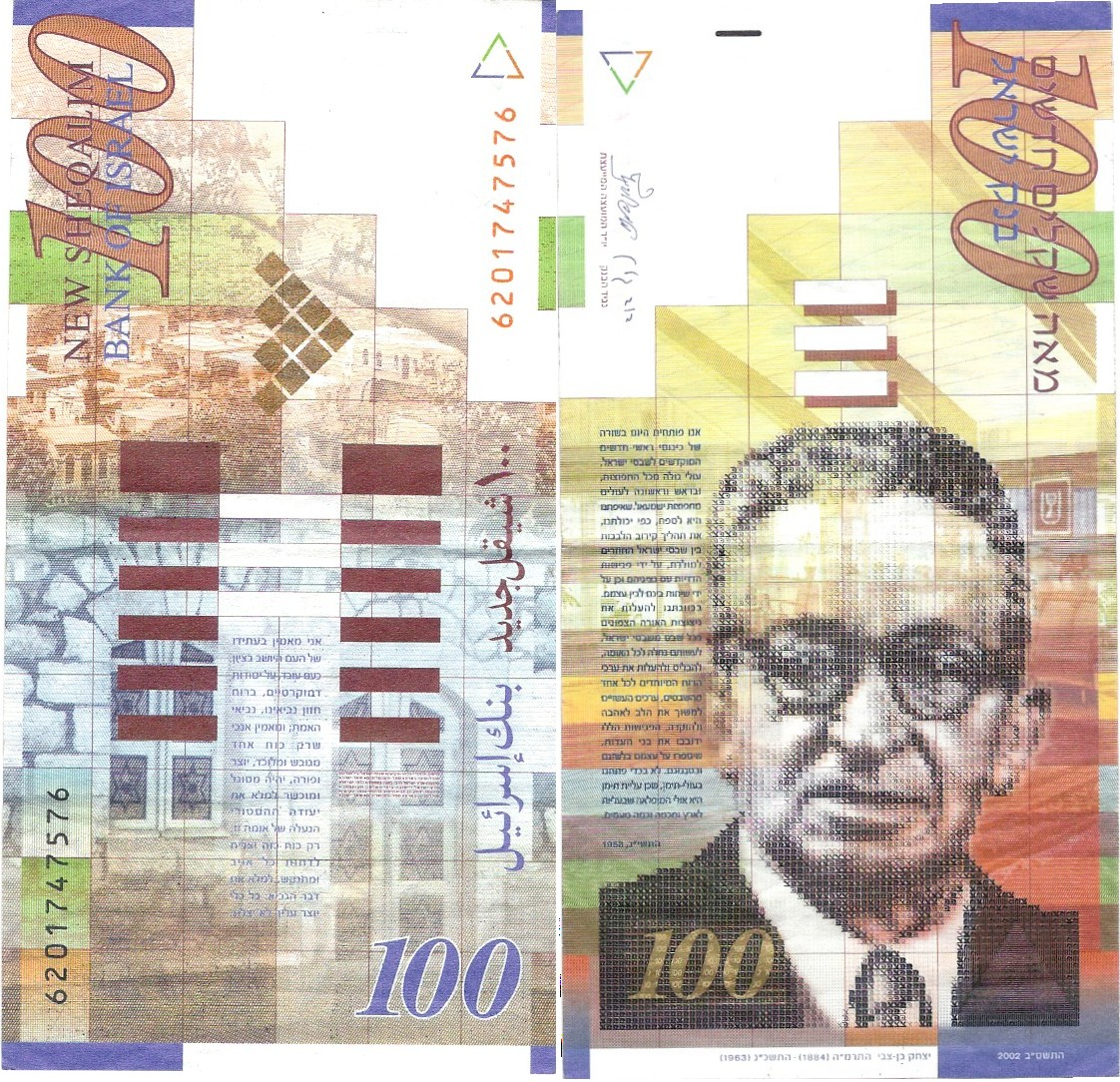
100 NIS banknote, printed from 1999 until 2017. The verso (on the left) shows the synagogue and a view of the Peki'in village.

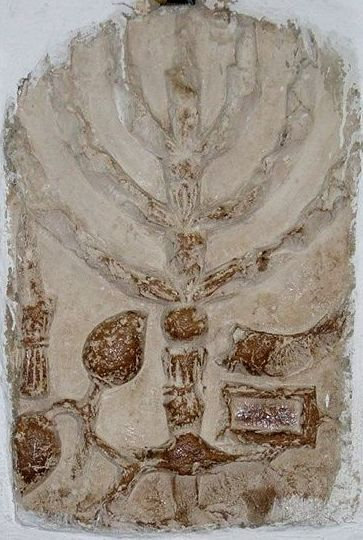
Stone tablet found at the synagogue

== See also ==
- Ancient synagogues in the Palestine region
  - Ancient synagogues in Israel
- History of the Jews in Israel
- List of synagogues in Israel
- Nahal Peki'in
