= Peki'in =

Local council in Israel

Peki'in: פְּקִיעִין; البقيعة
- Local council

Hebrew transcription(s)
  - ISO 259: Pqiˁin
  - Also spelled: Peqi'in (official)
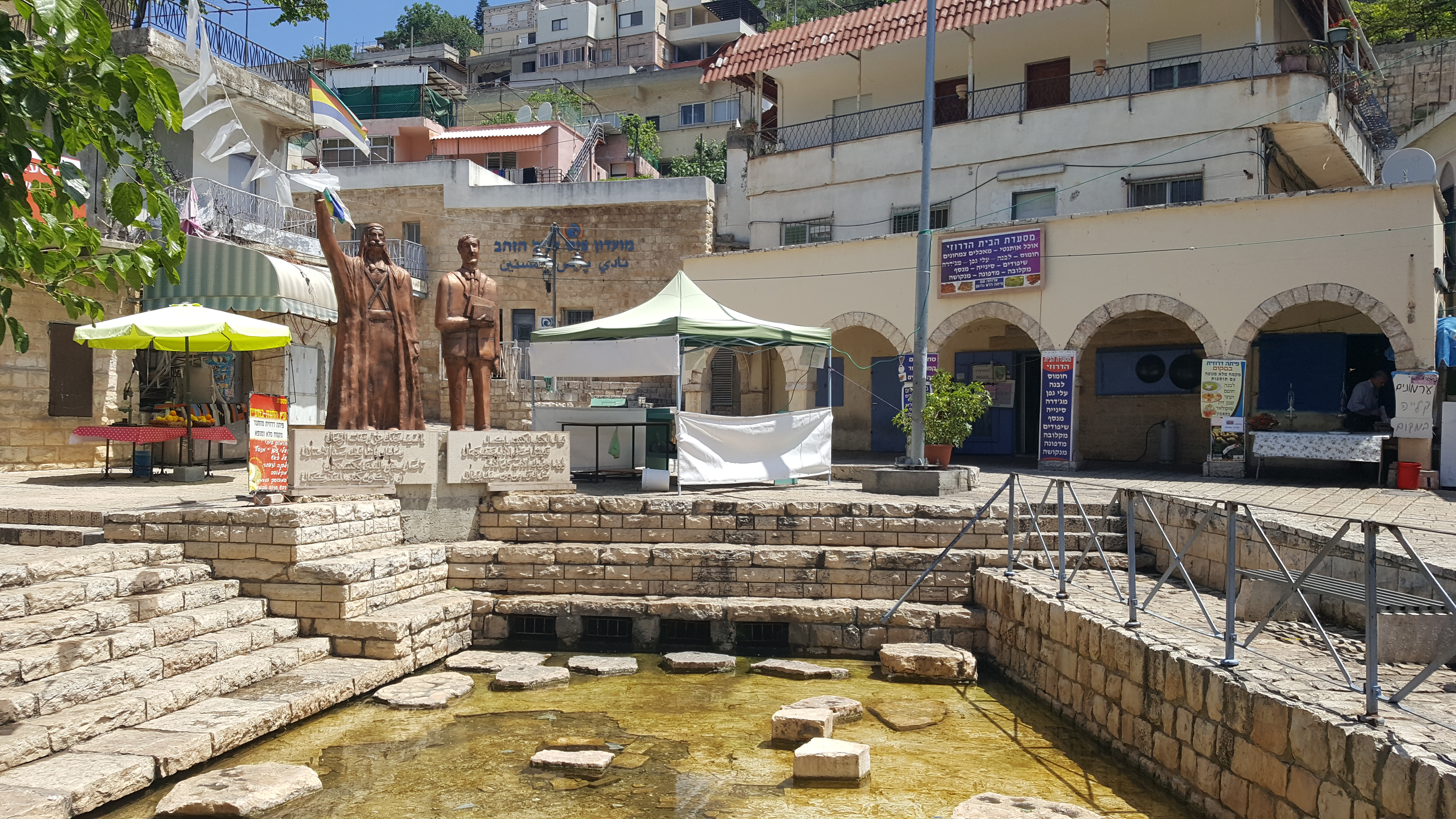

- Location within Northwest Israel Location within Israel
- Coordinates: 32°58′27″N 35°19′53″E
- Grid position: 181/264 PAL
- Country: Israel
- District: Northern
- Subdistrict: Acre
- Natural Region: Yehi'am
- Founded: 5000 BCE (Earliest settlement)

Area
  - Total: 3,565 dunams (3.565 km^{2}; 1.376 sq mi)

Population (2024)
  - Total: 6,114
  - Density: 1,715/km^{2} (4,442/sq mi)

Ethnicity
  - Arabs: 99.98%
  - Jews and others: 0.02%
- Name meaning: The little valley (between mountains)

Peki'in (alternatively Peqi'in; Hebrew: פְּקִיעִין), or Buqei'a (Levantine Arabic: البقيعة, romanized: əl-Buqēʿa), is a Druze–Arab town with local council status in Israel's Northern District. It is located eight kilometres east of Ma'alot-Tarshiha in the Upper Galilee. In 2024 it had a population of 6,114. The majority of residents are Druze (78%), with a large Christian (20.8%) and Muslim (1.2%) minorities.

The Jewish community of Peki'in maintained a presence since at least the 16th century with a short interruption during the 1936–1939 Arab revolt. Most Jews in Peki'in did not return to the village after the violence, and call themselves the Hadera diaspora. The Zinatis are the only family who returned, and it is currently represented by one elderly member, Margalit Zinati, residing in the village.

== History ==
=== Chalcolithic ===
Potsherds and ossuaries of the Chalcolithic period were found in the village, and a burial site close by, making a 100 dunams (25 acres) settlement a possibility. The village Baca in Josephus' The Jewish War is thought to be Peki'in. According to Josephus it marked the border between the kingdom of Herod Agrippa II, and Tyre.

==== DNA findings ====
A 2018 study conducted by scholars from Tel-Aviv University, the Israel Antiquities Authority and Harvard University discovered that 22 out of the 600 people who were buried in Peki'in cave from the Chalcolithic Period were of both local Levantine and Zagrosian ancestries, or as phrased in the paper itself: "Ancient DNA from Chalcolithic Israel reveals the role of population mixture in cultural transformation,” the scientists concluded that the homogeneous community found in the cave could source ~57% of its ancestry from groups related to those of the local Levant Neolithic, ~26% from groups related to those of the Anatolian Neolithic, and ~17% from groups related to those of the Iran Chalcolithic.". The scholars noted that the Zagros genetic material held "Certain characteristics, such as genetic mutations contributing to blue eye color, were not seen in the DNA test results of earlier Levantine human remains...The blue-eyed, fair-skinned community didn't continue, but at least now researchers have an idea why. "These findings suggest that the rise and fall of the Chalcolithic culture are probably due to demographic changes in the region".

=== Identification with ancient Peki'in ===
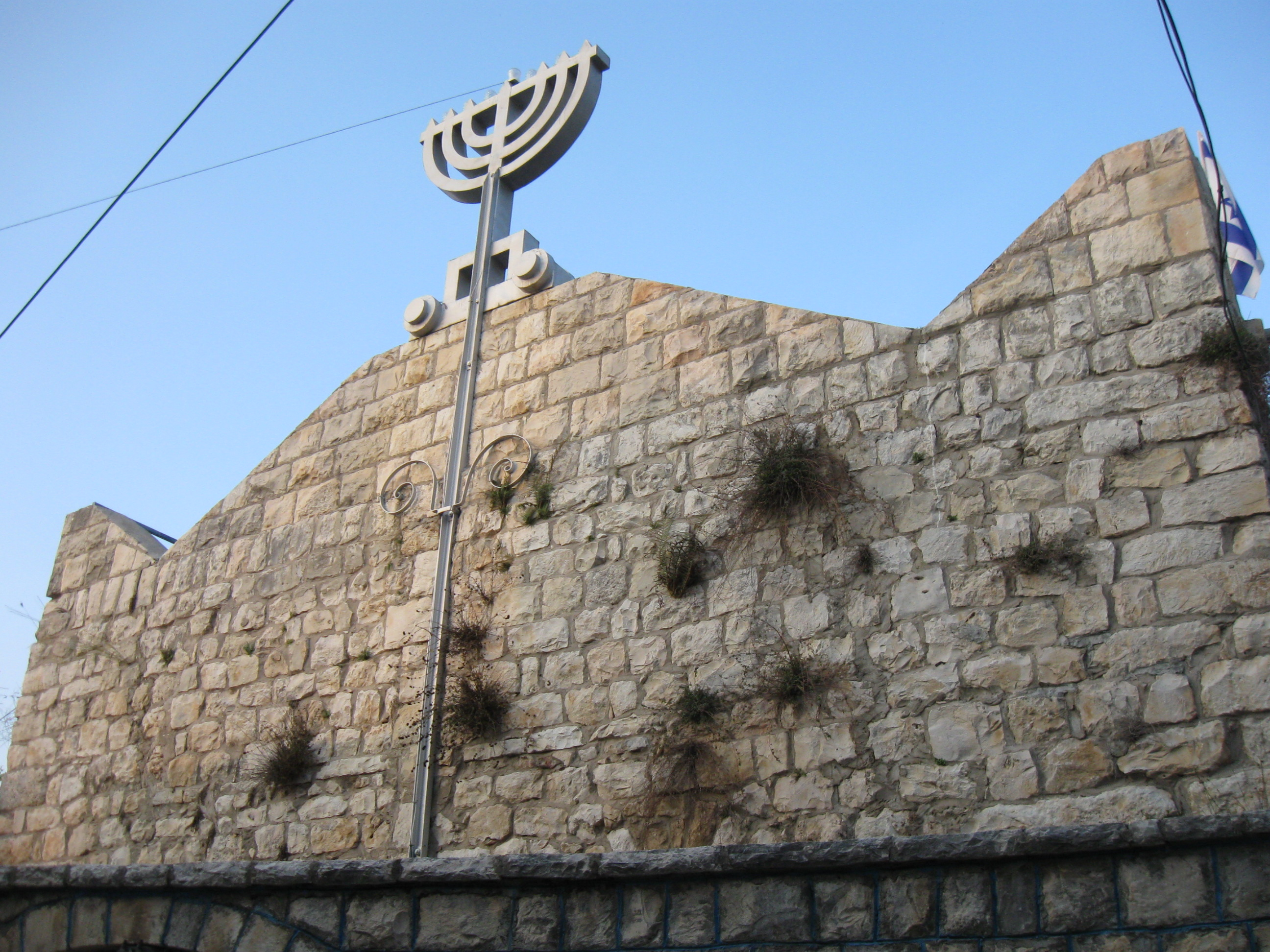
Old Synagogue in Peki'in

A set of Jewish traditions is associated with a certain Peki'in, often appearing in writing under the names Baka, Paka and Peki'in, near Lod. According to the Talmud, Rabbi Joshua ben Hananiah ran a Beth Midrash, Rabbi Shimon bar Yochai and his son Rabbi Elazar ben Shimon, hid in a cave from the Romans for 13 years, and Shimon bar Yochai went on to teach at the city. However, the mis-identification of Rabbinic Peki'in with Peki'in-Buqei'a is from the Ottoman period, and other sites in the vicinity of Rehovot have also been suggested. The first writing where the name Peki'in undoubtedly refers to this village is from a 1765 Hebrew travel book.

=== Crusader and Mamluk periods ===
In the Crusader era, Peki'in was known under the name of Bokehel. Together with several other villages in the area, it was part of the lordship of St. George, one of the largest in the Acre area. In the 12th century it was held by Henry de Milly, after his death it was inherited by his three daughters.

Henry de Milly's third and youngest daughter, Agnes of Milly, married Joscelin III. In 1220 their daughter Beatrix de Courtenay and her husband Otto von Botenlauben, Count of Henneberg, sold their land, including "one third of the fief of St. George", and "one third of the village of Bokehel", to the Teutonic Knights. During this era the village was connected by a road to Castellum Regis.

The presence of a Druze community in the village in the early Mamluk period is attested by the geographer Shams al-Din al-Dimashqi (1257–1327).

=== Ottoman period ===
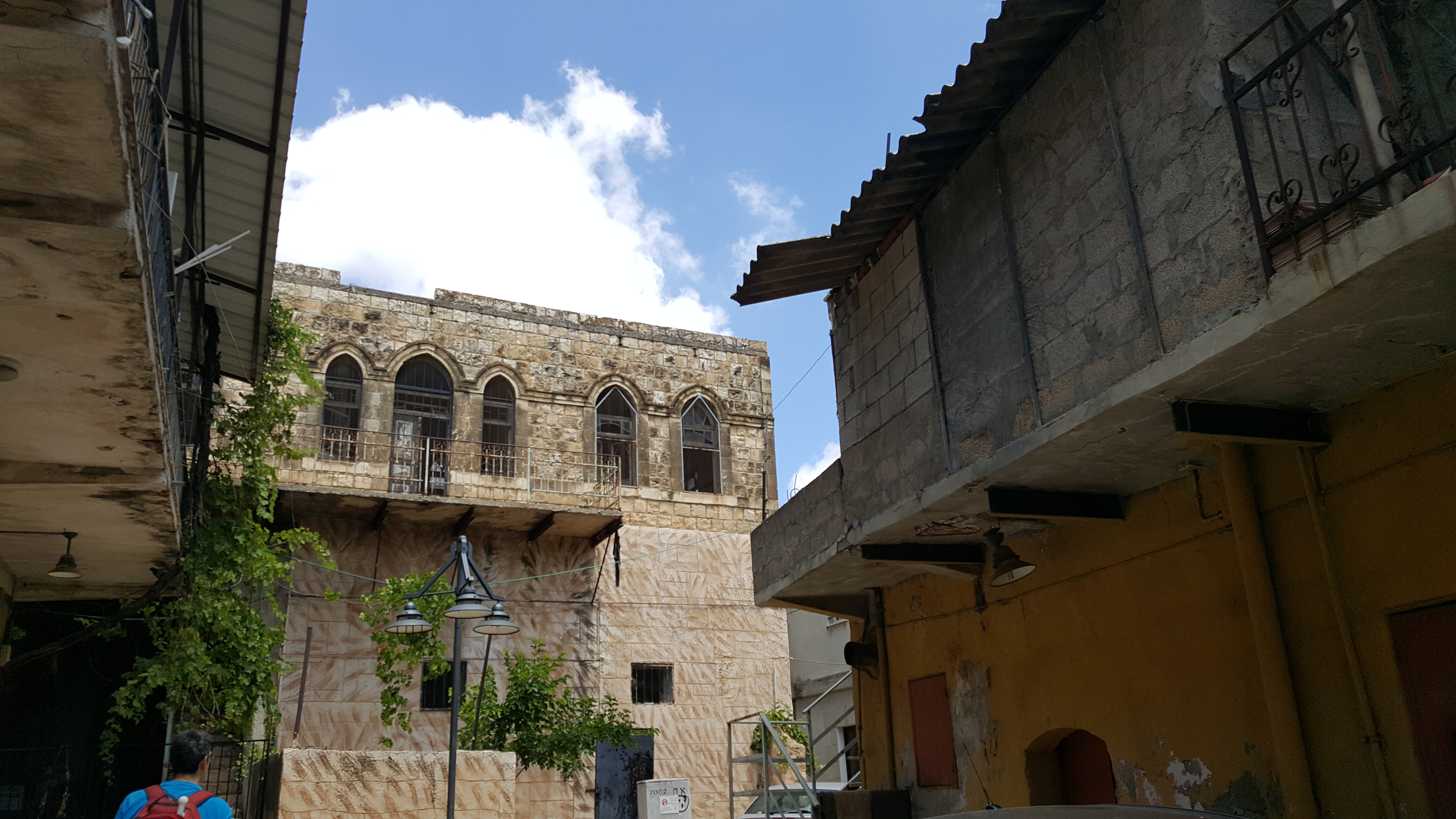
Zinati House

Incorporated into the Ottoman Empire in 1517 with the rest of the Levant region, Peki'in's Jewish population was recorded at 33 households in 1525, and experienced a rise, drop, stabilization and another rise before 1596. It is said some Kohanitic families emigrated from Kafr 'Inan, possibly in the late 16th century. The Almani family probably came from the village Alma. Peki'in also appeared in the 1596 tax registers as being in the Nahiya of Akka of the Liwa of Safad. It had a population of 77 households and 7 bachelors who were all Muslims, in addition to 79 Jewish households.

The villagers paid taxes on occasional revenues, goats and/or beehives, a press for olives or grapes, and jizya. A tax on silk spinning (dulab harir), which was levied in 1555 on six villages surrounding Mount Meron, rated highest in Peki'in. A silk industry is also attested by an account from 1602, and by several old mulberry trees in the village.

In 1754/5, Stephen Schultz discovered approximately ten Jewish families residing in Pek'in. Throughout the following century, the village received mentions from several Jewish visitors. In 1765, Rabbi Simcha, on behalf of Rabbi Joshua of Zlazitz, described the Jewish community as consisting of 50 householders who worked the fields and vineyards. The village's lands were fertile, featuring springs and Rashbi's old carob tree. Based on this information, Ben Zvi estimated the Jewish population of the village in 1765 to be around 250 people. In 1824, Rabbi David d'Beit Hillel visited Peki'in and reported about 20 native-born Jewish families, most of whom owned flocks of sheep and goats, and they maintained a small synagogue.

Based on Moses Montefiore's archives, in 1839, the Jewish community of Peki'in comprised long-established priestly families such as Zinati, Oudi, and Suli-Toma, alongside families who had migrated from other locations, including the Almani family from Alma, Tsror from Deir al-Qamar, and Shams from Hasbaya (the latter two in Lebanon).

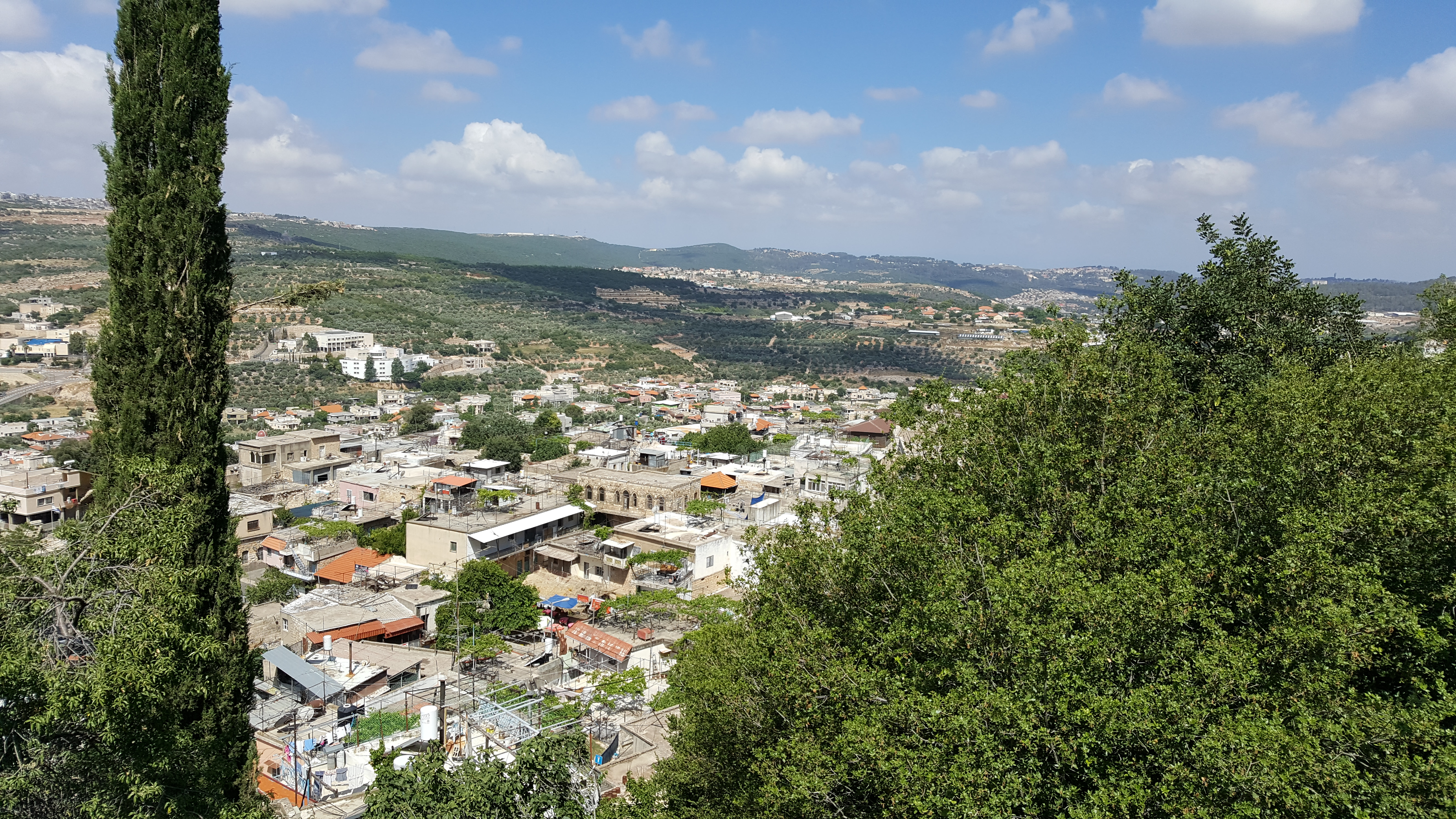
View of Peki'in

In 1875, French explorer Victor Guérin visited the village and described it as: "The population at present number 600—Druzes, United Greeks, Schismatic Greeks, and a few Jewish families, who descend from the ancient inhabitants of the country. Every year in the summer several hundreds of Jews come here from Tiberias to pass the hot season. Most of these Jews came originally from Europe, and are happy in finding here the last indigenous scions of the ancient national stock. ... At Bukeiah, thanks to the two springs which issue from the hill-side, they cultivate on the slopes and almost to the bottom of the valley delicious gardens, watered by numerous streams. Here grow, on different terraces, kept up by great walls, probably ancient, fruit-trees of all kinds, such as citrons, oranges, pomegranates, figs, quinces, and mulberries. The vine flourishes marvelously, as is shown by the enormous trunks. The United Greeks have a little church, which I found shut; the Schismatic Greeks also have one which has replaced a much more ancient Christian sanctuary. Only a few cut stones and the trunk of a column remain of it.The Jews worship in a synagogue of modern date."

In 1881, the Palestine Exploration Fund's Survey of Western Palestine described it as "A good village, built of stone, containing a chapel and a synagogue. There are about 100 Moslems, 100 Christians, 100 Druzes, and 100 Jews. It is situated on the slope of the hill, with gardens, figs, olives, pomegranates, and arable land. There is a good spring in the village, and two springs near. This is the only place where Jews cultivate the ground. They say it has descended to them from their fathers from time immemorial."

In November 1883, Laurence Oliphant visited Peki'in and observed a diverse population: 80 Druze families, 40 Greek Christians, and 20 Jewish families. The Jewish community totalled approximately 120 Jews, "who claimed to be the descendants of families who had tilled the land in this same locality prior to the destruction of Jerusalem and the subsequent dispersion of the race". The same year saw an outbreak of cholera, prompting wealthier Jews and rabbis from Safed and Tiberias to visit Peki'in, transforming it into a sanatorium. Oliphant wrote that the Druze had settled in Peki'in around 300 years earlier. He further noted discussions with Christian and Druze leaders regarding the Jewish families, who mentioned that historically, "more of the village lands belonged to them, but owing to the wars, pestilences, and other misfortunes which had overtaken the country at various times, their property had become diminished; indeed, there can be little doubt that the Druses themselves, when Fakr Eddin conquered this part of the country, appropriated some of it; so that now, ... the Jews are badly off."

A population list from about 1887 showed el Bukei’a to have about 950 inhabitants; Druse, Jews and Christians.

=== British Mandate period ===
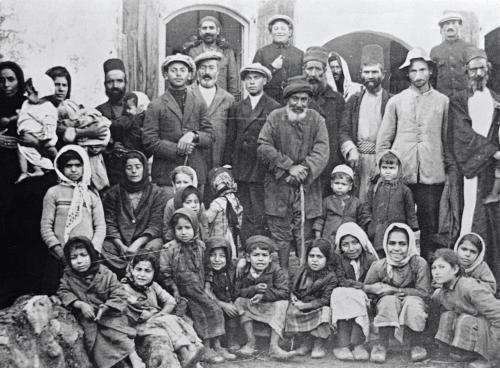
Jews of Peki'in, c. 1930

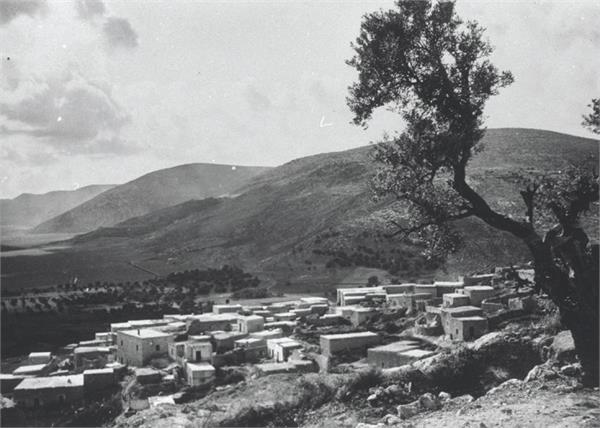
Peki’in 1940

In a census conducted in 1922 by the British Mandate authorities, Al Buqai'a had a population of 652 residents; 70 Muslims, 63 Jews, 215 Christians and 304 Druse. Of the Christians, 167 were Orthodox and 48 were Greek Catholic (Melchite). In the 1931 census, El Buqei'a had a total population of 799; 71 Muslims, 52 Jews, 264 Christians and 412 Druse, in a total of 190 houses.

In 1927, Yitzhak Ben-Zvi observed that the ancient Jewish community of Peki'in, once a majority, was struggling for survival as it dwindled in size and faced declining material conditions. Ben Zvi noted that Jewish homes were concentrated on one hill and described the community as diligent in both their work on the land and its cultivation. They adhered strictly to Jewish practices, including netilat yadayim, tefilin, and kashrut. Following the death of their last shohet, they abstained from eating meat for several months. Despite a period of emigration to Argentina, many returned with financial resources that they reinvested in their native village. The local Hebrew school had 25 pupils at that time, and aside from a few elders, the residents conversed fluently in Hebrew, albeit with a fellahin accent.

During the 1929 riots, the Druze village leader (mukhtar), Abdullah Saleh, intervened to protect the Jewish residents of Peki’in and prevent attacks by inhabitants of the nearby Arab village of Suhmata, who sought to enter the village and harm the local Jewish community. Fearing assaults, the Jews spent their nights in Druze homes and avoided leaving the village, a situation that ultimately led many families to relocate. The 1936 Arab revolt forced the Jews of Peki'in to leave their homes for safer parts of the country; only a few of them later returned.

In the 1945 statistics, the population was 990; 100 Muslims, 370 Christians, and 520 "others", that is Druse, owning 10,276 dunams, while Jews owned 189 dunams, and 3,731 was publicly owned, according to an official land and population survey. Of this, 1,598 were allocated for plantations and irrigable land, 3,424 for cereals, while 40 dunams were classified as built-up areas.

=== State of Israel ===
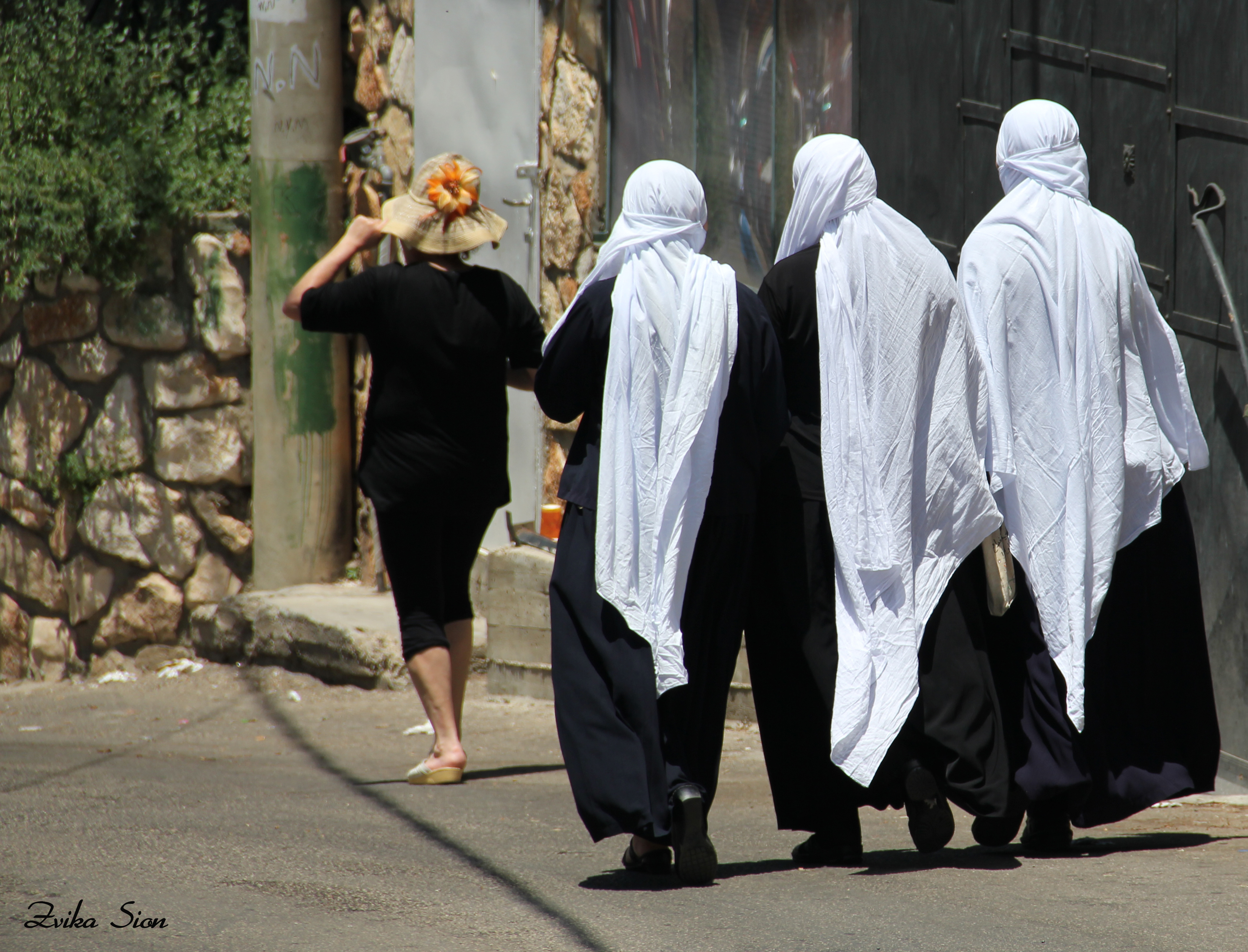
Druse women of Peki'in, 2011

In July 2006, Peki'in was hit by Katyusha rockets launched by Hezbollah, causing significant damage to homes and orchards.

In October 2007, riots broke out after the installation of a cellular antenna due to concerns that such antennas have been linked to an increase in cancer. Riot police fired bullets and gas grenades, which further angered the residents, who burned down the house of a Jewish family living in the village. In December 2007, the last Jewish family left the town after their car was torched. Only Margalit Zinati, a descendant of a Mustarabim family, has remained there to keep alive the memory of the town's vanishing Jewish heritage.

In 2011, the Israeli government approved an aid program of NIS 680 million ($184M) for housing, education and tourism upgrades in Peki'in and other Druze communities in northern Israel.

== Demographics ==
Historical population
Year	Pop.	±%
1972	2,200	—
1983	3,100	+40.9%
1995	4,000	+29.0%
2008	5,400	+35.0%
2022	5,919	+9.6%
2024	6,114	+3.3%

In 2022, 77.9% of the population was Druze, 21% was Christian and 1.1% was Muslim.

== Education and culture ==
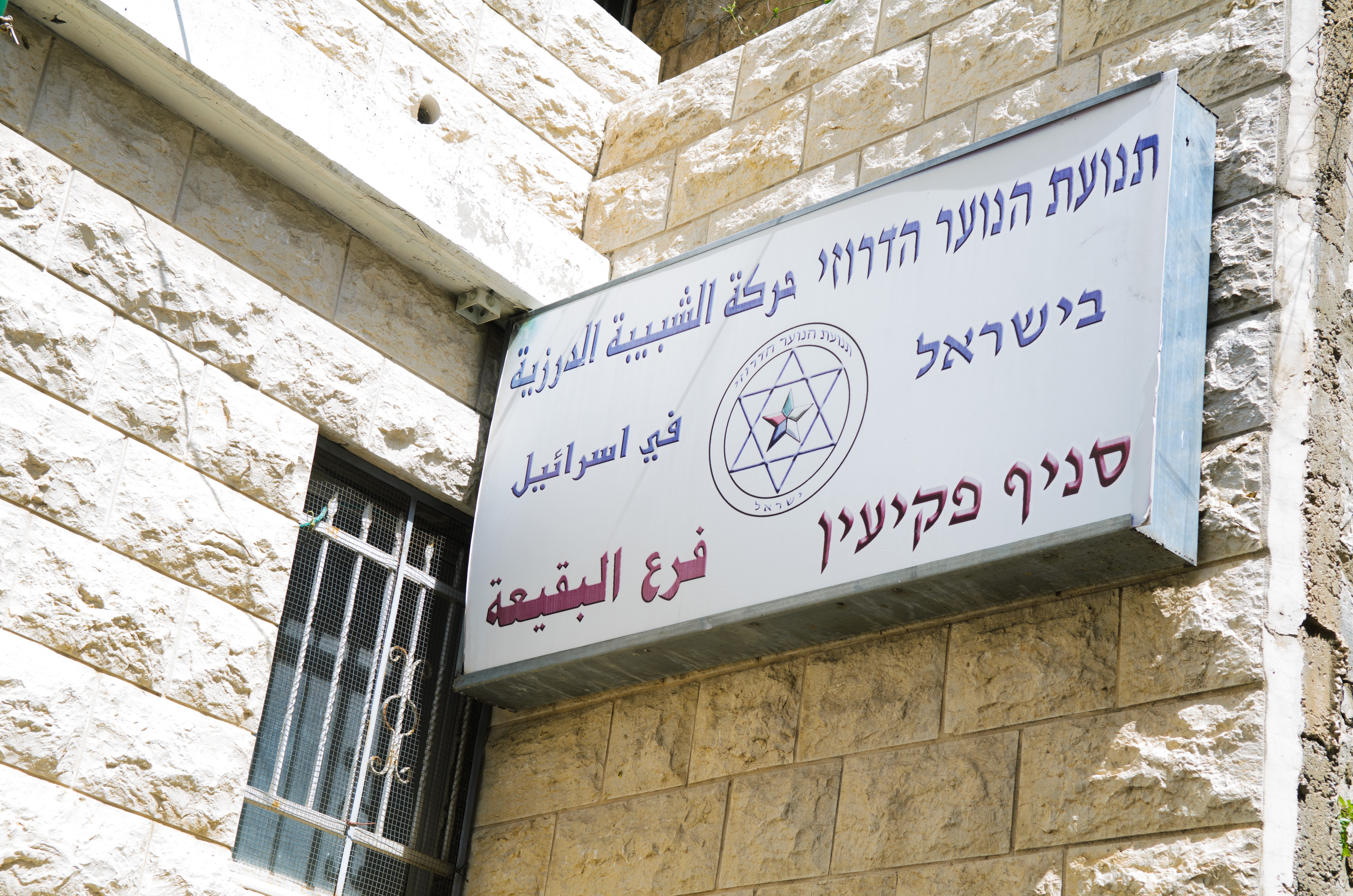
The Druze Youth Movement in Israel, Peki'in branch

The Druze Youth Movement in Israel, a movement with 19 branches around the country and a membership of 12,000, has its headquarters in Peki'in. The founder of the movement is Hamad Amar, an Israeli Druze member of the Knesset from Shfaram, who established it to pass on Druze heritage to the younger generation while developing a sense of national Israeli pride.

== Tourism ==
According to Galib Kheir, head of the town's tourism department, about 60,000 tourists visit Peki'in each year. The tourist trade supports local restaurants and specialty shops. The town also has a hotel and youth hostel.

Additionally, the city is located next to the cave where Rabbi Shimon bar Yochai stayed with Rabbi Eleazar ben Azariah for 13 years.

== Voting patterns ==
In the 2022 election, 66 percent of voters in Peki'in voted for the parties of the center-left coalition led by Yair Lapid, while 31 percent voted for the Arab parties and 2 percent voted for the parties of the right-wing coalition led by Benjamin Netanyahu.

In the 2026 election, 66 percent of voters in Peki'in voted for the parties of the center-left coalition led by Gadi Eisenkot, while 26 percent voted for the Arab parties and 7 percent voted for the parties of the right-wing coalition led by Benjamin Netanyahu. An additional 1 percent voted for the Reservists. Voter turnout increased 20 percent from the 2022 election.

== Notable people ==
- Margalit Zinati
- Shimon bar Yochai

== See also ==
- Nahal Peki'in
- Arab localities in Israel
- Peki'in Synagogue

== Bibliography ==
- Barron, J. B., ed. (1923). Palestine: Report and General Abstracts of the Census of 1922. Government of Palestine.
- Conder, C. R.; Kitchener, H.H. (1881). The Survey of Western Palestine: Memoirs of the Topography, Orography, Hydrography, and Archaeology. Vol. 1. London: Committee of the Palestine Exploration Fund.
- Department of Statistics (1945). Village Statistics, April, 1945. Government of Palestine.
- Ellenblum, R. (2003). Frankish Rural Settlement in the Latin Kingdom of Jerusalem. Cambridge University Press. ISBN 9780521521871.
- Falah, Salman (1975). "A History of the Druze Settlements in Palestine during the Ottoman Period". In Ma'oz, Moshe (ed.). Studies on Palestine during the Ottoman Period. Jerusalem: Magnes Press. ISBN 9789652235893.
- Frankel, Rafael (1988). "Topographical notes on the territory of Acre in the Crusader period". Israel Exploration Journal. 38 (4): 249–272.
- Guérin, V. (1880). Description Géographique Historique et Archéologique de la Palestine (in French). Vol. 3: Galilee, pt. 2. Paris: L'Imprimerie Nationale.
- Hadawi, S. (1970). Village Statistics of 1945: A Classification of Land and Area ownership in Palestine. Palestine Liberation Organization Research Center.
- Hütteroth, W.-D.; Abdulfattah, K. (1977). Historical Geography of Palestine, Transjordan and Southern Syria in the Late 16th Century. Erlanger Geographische Arbeiten, Sonderband 5. Erlangen, Germany: Vorstand der Fränkischen Geographischen Gesellschaft. ISBN 978-3-920405-41-4.
- Mills, E., ed. (1932). Census of Palestine 1931. Population of Villages, Towns and Administrative Areas. Jerusalem: Government of Palestine.
- Palmer, E. H. (1881). The Survey of Western Palestine: Arabic and English Name Lists Collected During the Survey by Lieutenants Conder and Kitchener, R. E. Transliterated and Explained by E.H. Palmer. Committee of the Palestine Exploration Fund.
- Pringle, D. (1993). The Churches of the Crusader Kingdom of Jerusalem: A-K (excluding Acre and Jerusalem). Vol. I. Cambridge University Press. ISBN 0-521-39036-2.
- Rhode, H. (1979). Administration and Population of the Sancak of Safed in the Sixteenth Century. Columbia University. Archived from the original on 1 March 2020.
- Röhricht, R. (1893). (RRH) Regesta regni Hierosolymitani (MXCVII-MCCXCI) (in Latin). Berlin: Libraria Academica Wageriana.
- Schumacher, G. (1888). "Population list of the Liwa of Akka". Quarterly Statement - Palestine Exploration Fund. 20: 169–191.
- Strehlke, E., ed. (1869). Tabulae Ordinis Theutonici ex tabularii regii Berolinensis codice potissimum. Berlin: Weidmanns.
