= Eleazar ben Arach =

1st-century Jewish scholar

Eleazar ben Arach was one of the tannaim of the second generation (1st century). Little is known about him.

== Teachings ==
Described as first among the disciples of Yohanan ben Zakkai, it was said, "If all the sages of Israel were placed in one scale, and Eleazar ben Arach in the other, he would outweigh them all". Yochanan described him as a "gushing stream" or "ever-flowing spring". Alon Goshen-Gottstein and Bertrand Badie wrote that this metaphor of rabbinical sage as spring was central to Eleazar's role in Talmud. They continue by noting he represented a symbol of a particular kind of rabbinical learning, one that not only repeated existing wisdom from the scripture but also innovated, providing new lessons for new circumstance as a spring or a well provides fresh (new) water.

If the difference of opinion concerning the words of R. Yoḥanan b. Zakkai indeed reflects fundamentally different approaches to the study of Torah, we are in a position to identify the circle that gave rise to the praise heaped on R. Eleazar ben Arach. An examination of the variants of this tradition in Avot de Rabbi Natan, suggests that the praise of R. Eleazar ben Arach (the everflowing spring) originated in the academy of R. Akiva. [...] R. Akiva juxtaposes a cistern and a well. The cistern contains only what is put in it while the well provides fresh water. This is the essential contrast between a cistern and a well. Consequently, many disciples come and drink from the well.

Rabbi Eleazar ben Arach is known for saying: "If there was no Torah, there would be no decorum (derekh eretz)."

== Tomb ==
Crusader-period Jewish sources identify Eleazar ben Arach's tomb at the Upper Galilee town of Alma. Benjamin of Tudela mentions his tomb in a "large cemetery of the Israelites" at Alma, which also houses the tombs of Eleazar ben Azariah, Honi HaMe'agel, Simeon ben Gamliel and Jose the Galilean. An anonymous Hebrew manuscript of the same period states that the Jews and Muslims of Alma light candles on Eleazar ben Arach's tomb on Shabbat Eve, and mention a nearby miracle-working tree.

== Sources ==
The Jewish Encyclopedia cites the following bibliography:

- Wilhelm Bacher, Die Agada der Tannaïten, i. 74 et seq.
- Jakob Brüll, Mebo ha-Mishnah, i. 87.
- Zecharias Frankel, Darke ha-Mishnah, p. 91.
- Jacob Hamburger, Real-Enzyklopädie für Bibel und Talmud, ii. 155.
- Jehiel ben Solomon Heilprin, Seder ha-Dorot, ii. s.v.
- Isaac Hirsch Weiss, Dor Dor we-Dorshaw, ii. 80.
- Abraham Zacuto, Sefer Hayuhasin. Filipowski edition, p. 35b.
