= Margalit Zinati =

"Keeper of the Jewish embers" in Peki'in (born 1931)

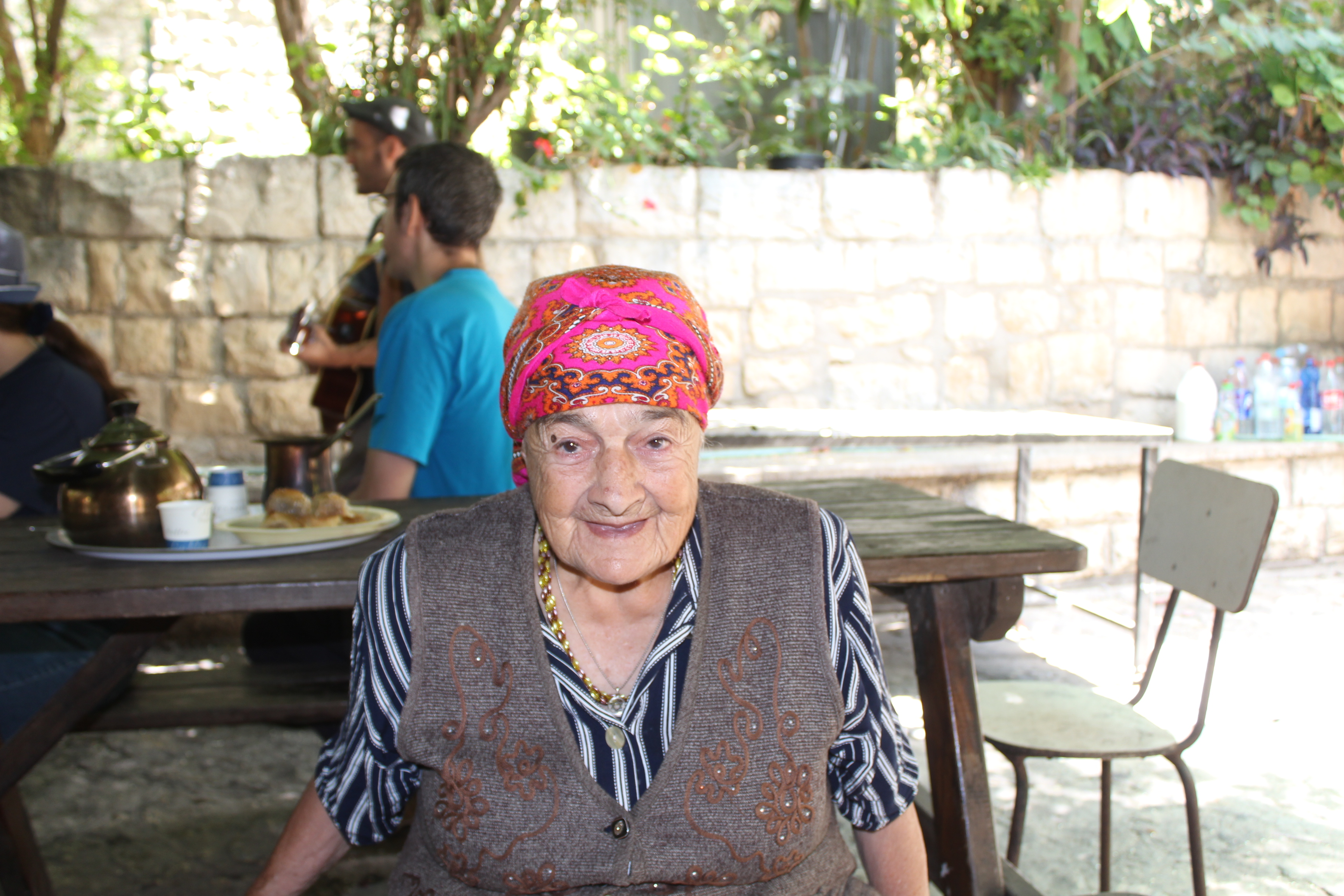
- Zinati at the Peki'in Synagogue square in 2016
- Born: October 1931 (age 95) (United Kingdom) Peki'in, British Palestine
- Known for: Being a descendant of a Jewish dynasty from the Second Temple and the fact that she was for years the only Jewish person in Peki'in.

Margalit Zinati (Hebrew: מרגלית זינאתי; born October 1931) is an Israeli Jewish woman and member of the ancient Zinati family, which is one of the three priestly families that have lived in Peki'in for millennia.

Margalit was for years the only Jew in the city and guarded the ancient synagogue. Margalit is known as the "keeper of the Jewish embers" in Peki'in. In 2018, the 70th anniversary of the independence of the State of Israel, she was chosen to light a torch in the torch-lighting ceremony.

== Family and personal life ==
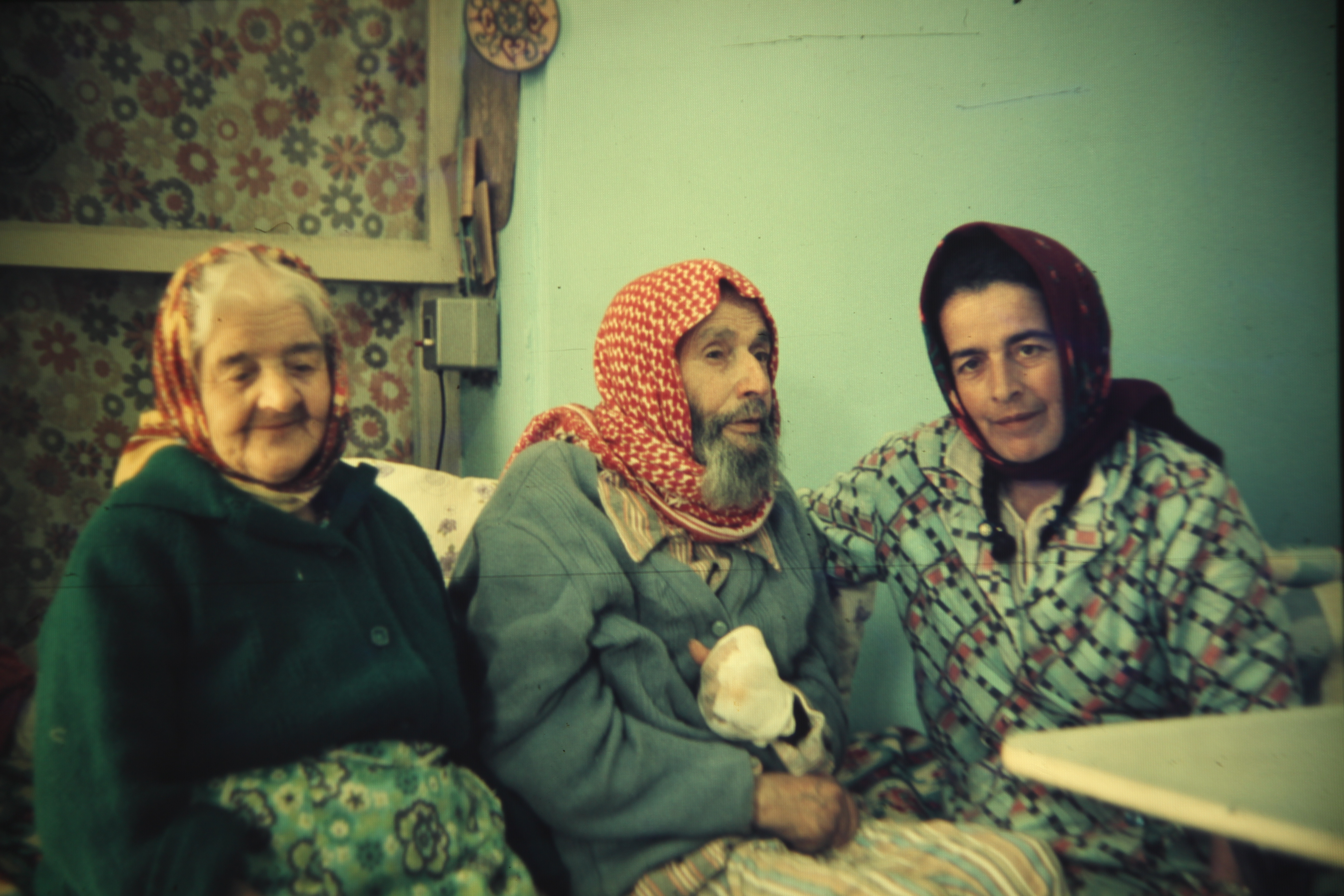
Mazal-Saada, Yosef and Margalit Zinati in their home in Peki'in, from left to right, 1981

Margalit Zinati is the daughter of Yosef and Saada Zinati, and sister of Shaul Zinati. She is fluent in Arabic and Hebrew.

Most Jews fled Peki'in permanently during the 1936–1939 Arab revolt, but the Zinati family decided to return after temporarily moving to Hadera for a few months between 1938 and 1939.

At fourteen, Margalit left Peki'in to attend school for four years: first at kibbutz Yagur, then at the Lämel School in Jerusalem, and finally in Rehovot. She returned at the outbreak of the 1948 Arab–Israeli War, in which her brother Shaul participated. The family was forced to leave yet again for a period of time by Fawzi al-Qawuqji's forces. She returned to Peki'in after the war, deciding not to marry so she could stay in the village to protect the synagogue and her parents' fields.
