= Alma, Israel =

Alma: עַלְמָה (Hebrew)
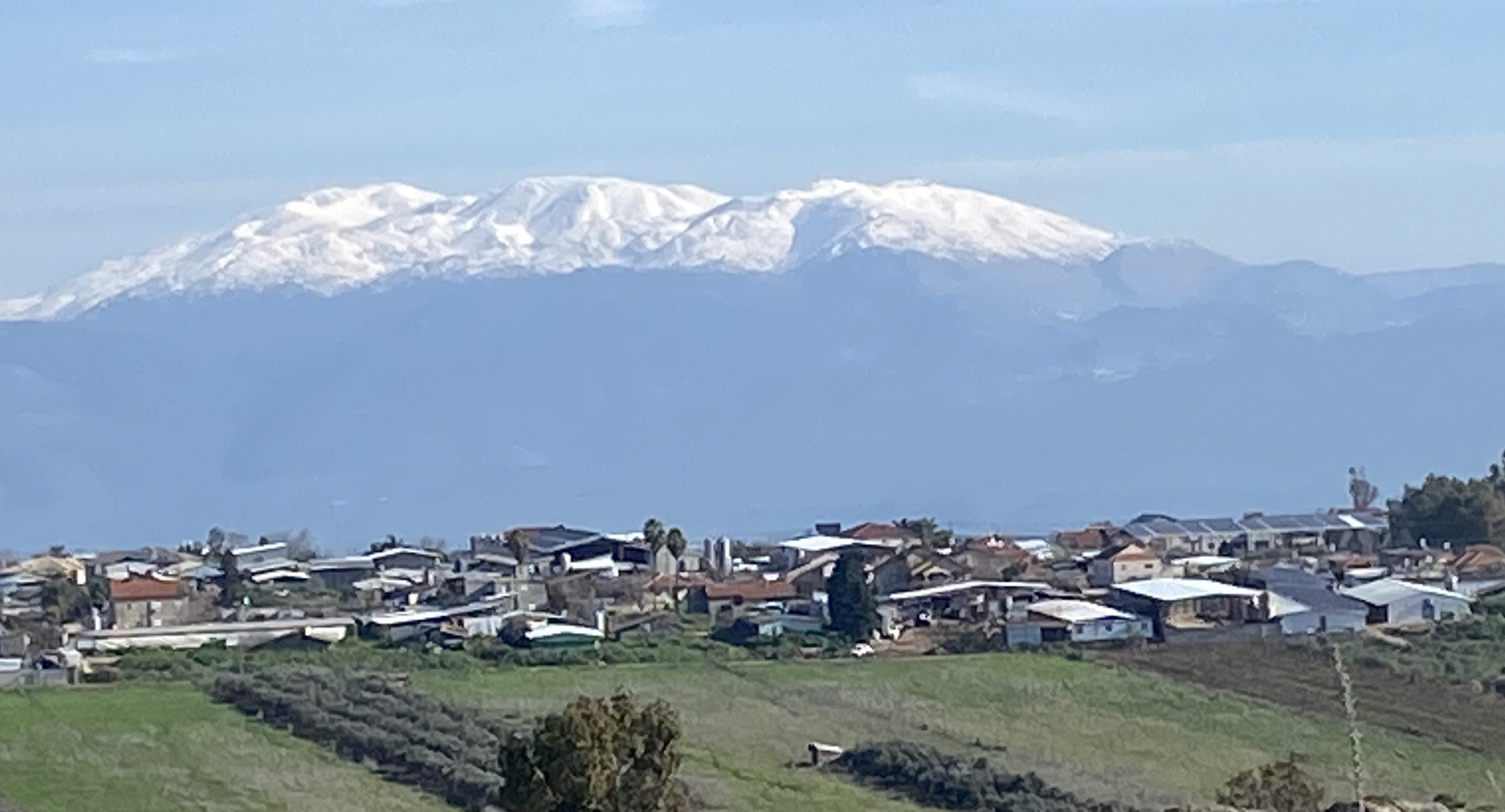

- Location within Northeast Israel Location within Israel
- Coordinates: 33°03′04″N 35°30′00″E
- Country: Israel
- District: Northern
- Subdistrict: Safed
- Council: Merom HaGalil
- Affiliation: Hapoel HaMizrachi
- Founded: 1 September 1949
- Founder: Libyan Jews
- Population (2024): 906

Alma (Hebrew: עַלְמָה, Arabic: علما) is a religious Jewish moshav in the Upper Galilee in northern Israel. It falls under the jurisdiction of the Merom HaGalil Regional Council. In 2024, it had a population of 906. It is built on the basaltic plateau 10 km north of Safed, and about 4 km south of the Lebanese border. Prior to the 1948 Arab-Israeli War, it was populated by Arabs.

== History ==
=== Roman period ===
Under the Judaea Province, a Jewish town was situated at this spot. Ceramics from the Byzantine era have been found here. Alma had several nearby khirbas, and fragments of inscriptions from an ancient synagogue were found at the site of the village in the 20th century. Remains of a ruined watch-tower was found on the crest of the ridge, and a quarter of a mile south of those there were three perfect dolmens, not very large.

=== Crusader period ===
The name Alma is first mentioned in the Crusader period, from a personal name. The Jewish community existed until the 17th century. Benjamin of Tudela (1130–1173) said that during his visit, he found 50 Jewish families living in Alma.

The Crusaders called the village "Alme"; it remained under their rule until 1187. While travelling though the region in the 12th century CE, Benjamin of Tudela noted that Alma contained fifty Jewish inhabitants and a "large cemetery of the Israelites", where several sages mentioned in the Mishnah and Talmud were buried. An anonymous Hebrew manuscript of the period mentions that the village's inhabitants were Jews and Muslims, and the lord apparently Frankish. The narrative tells that on every Shabbat Eve, Jews and Muslims light candles on the tomb of Rabbi Eleazar ben Arach, a tanna and a local tzadik (righteous man), and mentions a nearby miracle-working tree.

Two inscriptions discovered in 'Alma indicate the presence of an ancient Jewish synagogue at the site. One inscription was discovered on a lintel fragment featuring a bilingual Hebrew and Aramaic inscription, with its right half repurposed. It conveys a blessing of peace for the location and the people of Israel, along with a dedication by the artisan. (Note: The inscription reads: “יהי שלום על המקום הזה ועל כל מקומות עמו ישראל. אמן. סלה. אנה יוסה בר לוי הלוי אומנה דעבדת הדין שקופה”, translating into “May there be peace upon this place and upon all the places of his people Israel. Amen. Selah. I am Yose, son of Levi, the Levite, the artisan who made this lintel.”) The dating corresponds with that of the Bar'am synagogues, and the unusual first-person usage, similar to Jerusalem epitaphs, acknowledges Levi as both a name and title. Additionally, a second inscription—a two-line Aramaic inscription (Note: The inscription reads: “]--[נה טברייה דע]בד -- | הדי[ן שקופה מלך ע]למה יתן ברכתה בעמלה[”, translating into: “…na the Tiberian who made/donated this lintel. May the king of the world (bless his work).”)—was found in secondary use in the modern synagogue of 'Alma.

An anonymous Hebrew manuscript of the period mentions that the village's inhabitants were Jews and Muslims, and the lord apparently Frankish. The narrative tells that on every Shabbat Eve, Jews and Muslims light candles on the tomb of Rabbi Eleazar ben Arach, a tanna and a local tzadik (righteous man), and mentions a nearby miracle-working tree.

=== Ottoman era ===
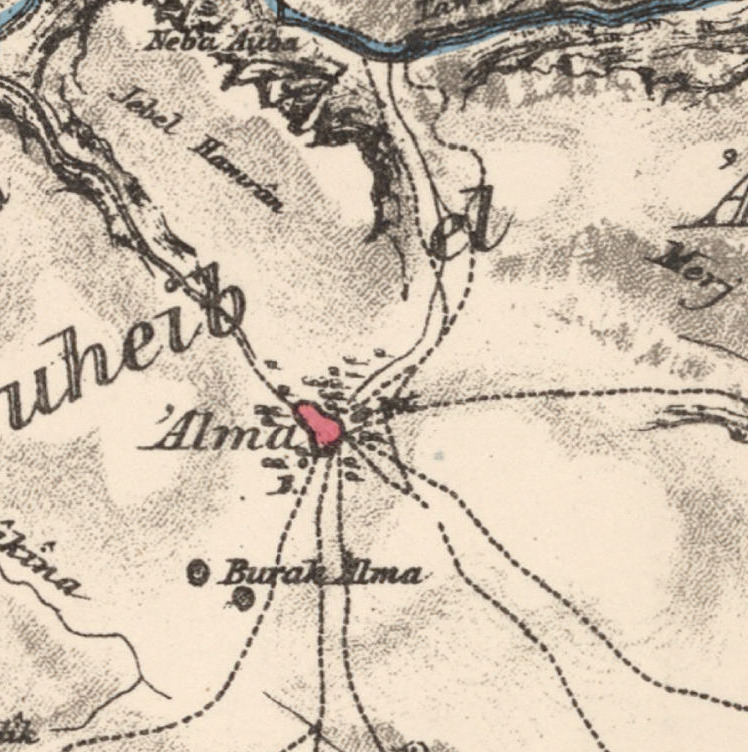
Map of Alma, 1870s

At the beginning of the period of Ottoman rule over Palestine, Moshe Basola passed through Alma during 1521-1523. He noted that there were 15 Jewish families and one synagogue there, though no Jews are listed in the early Ottoman tax registers. Rhode hypothesize that Basola have counted some Jews who went back and forth between Alma and Safad, and were listed/taxed there.

In the Ottoman tax registers of 1596, the village is listed as forming part of the nahiya ("subdistrict") of Jira in the liwa' ("district") of Safad. It had a relatively large population of 1,440, consisting of 288 Muslim households and 140 Muslim bachelors, together with seven Jewish households and one Jewish bachelor. The village paid taxes on goats, beehives, a water-powered mill, and a press that was used for processing olives or grapes. Total tax revenue amounted to a substantial 51,100 akce. Alma's prosperity was attributed to its close proximity to Safad.

Edward Robinson and Eli Smith, who travelled to the region in 1838, give the full name of the village as 'Alma el-Khait (Arabic: علماالخيط).

James Finn, the British consul to Jerusalem who travelled around Palestine between 1853 and 1856, describes the village of Alma as being situated in an area in which volcanic basalt was abundant. Around the village, women and children were gathering olives from the trees by beating them with poles and then collecting the fallen fruit. He notes that the small district in which the village is located is known by the locals as "the Khait" (Arabic for "string") and that they "boast of its extraordinary fertility in corn-produce."

Victor Guérin visited in 1875, and noted that 200 Muslim inhabitants lived there. In The Survey of Western Palestine (1881), Alma is described as a village built of stone with about 250 "Algerine Mohammedan" residents, situated in the middle of a fertile plain with a few gardens.

A population list from about 1887 showed Alma to have about 1,105 Muslim inhabitants.

=== British Mandate period ===
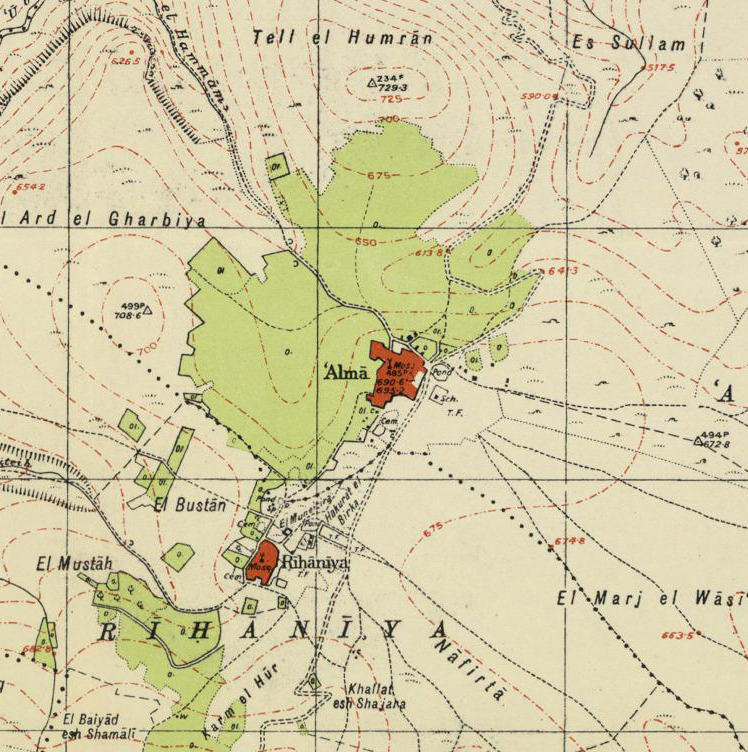
Map of Alma, 1940s

Alma was in the Safad Subdistrict, Mandatory Palestine. The population of Alma in the 1922 census consisted of 309 Muslims, increasing to 712 Muslims in 148 occupied houses by 1931.

In the 1945 statistics, the population had reached 950, still all Muslim.

The villagers were heavily involved in agriculture, including raising livestock and growing crops. During the 1942/43 season olive trees were recorded as being grown on 750 dunums of village land, 550 dunums of which were fruit-bearing trees. It was the largest olive grove in Safad district. In 1944–45 983 dunums were irrigated or used for orchards and 7,475 dunums were devoted to cereal crops.

The village comprised a total area of 19,498 dunums of which 17,240 dunums was run by Arabs and the rest public. The population of the village was entirely Arab in ethnicity and Muslim in religion. They had their own mosque and elementary school, which pupils from al-Rihaniyya also attended.

A large number of inhabitants were employed in cereal farming, which occupied about 38% of the land area. Some land was also allocated for irrigation and plantation, and the growing of olives.

Types of landuse in dunams by Arabs in 1945:

Land Usage	Dunams
Irrigated & Plantation	983
Olives	750
Cereal	7,475
Urban	147
Cultivable	8,458
Non-cultivable	10,893

The land ownership of the village before occupation in dunums:

Owner	Durums
Arab	17,240
Jewish	0
Public	2,258
Total	19,498

=== State of Israel ===
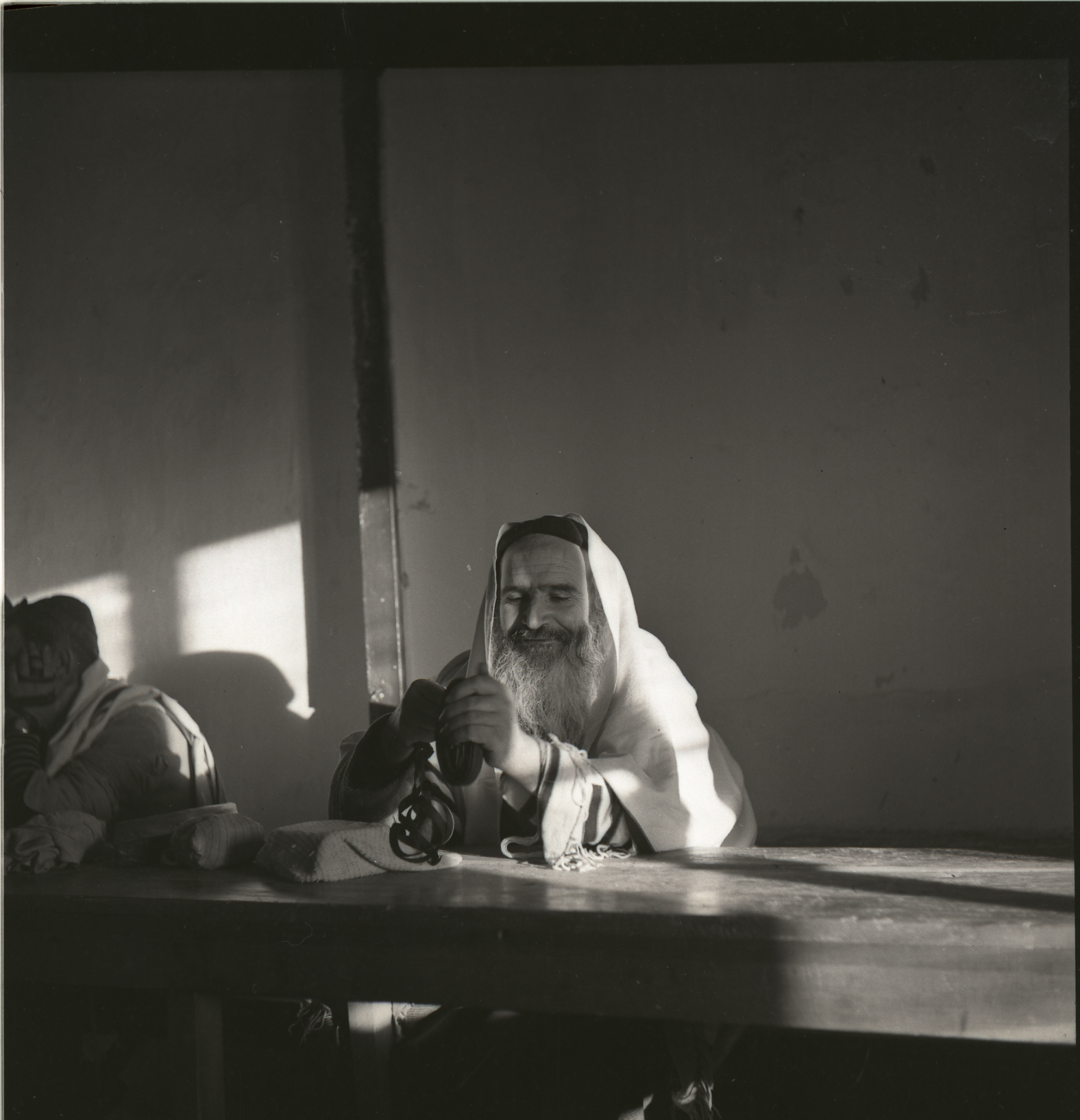
Orthodox Jewish man in Alma (1957)

The village was captured by the Israeli forces from the local Arab population in Operation Hiram on 30 October 1948. Israeli historian Benny Morris has documented that Alma was the one village in the area where the villagers were uprooted and/or expelled by the Israeli forces, in spite of the fact that they had not offered any resistance.

Alma was repopulated on 1 September 1949 by immigrants to Israel from Libya. In 1953, a group of converts to Judaism, known as the Jews of San Nicandro, arrived from Italy. They later abandoned Alma to live in other nearby moshavim. After the Italians left, Cochin Jews arrived from India. By 1968, Alma's inhabitants were mostly from Libya and Tunisia. The economy is based on hillculture (vineyards, deciduous fruit, olives, vegetables) and cattle. In its early years of development, Alma was associated with Hapoel HaMizrachi.

Historical population and ethnic composition of Alma
Year	Jews	Muslims	Others	Total
12th century	50	?
1521	15	?
1596	8 households	428 households		1,440
1875		200
1881		250
1887		1,105
1922		309
1931		712
1945		950
1948: Israeli independence. Expulsion of Arab Muslim population
2022				906

== Archaeology ==
Near the moshav's cemetery lie the remnants of what has been identified as a synagogue, perhaps dating to the 3rd century, though it has never been systematically excavated or properly researched. Also nearby are several tombs, including those of two prominent Sages (tannaim) of the 1st and 2nd centuries CE, one belonging to Eleazar ben Arach, and one which is traditionally recognized as Eliezer ben Hurcanus' tomb.

== Landmarks ==
Alma is located about 600 m above sea level, in an area called Alma Heights, bordered by the Dishon Stream. The Dishon Stream Nature Reserve is located next to the village, as well as the Circassian village Rehaniya.

== Bibliography ==
- Barron, J. B., ed. (1923). Palestine: Report and General Abstracts of the Census of 1922. Government of Palestine.
- Benjamin of Tudela (2003). Thomas Wright (ed.). Early Travels in Palestine (Illustrated ed.). Courier Dover Publications. ISBN 978-0-486-42871-0.
- Conder, C.R.; Kitchener, H.H. (1881). The Survey of Western Palestine: Memoirs of the Topography, Orography, Hydrography, and Archaeology. Vol. 1. London: Committee of the Palestine Exploration Fund. (p. 205)
- Dauphin, C. (1998). La Palestine byzantine, Peuplement et Populations. BAR International Series 726 (in French). Vol. III : Catalogue. Oxford: Archeopress. ISBN 0860549054.
- Department of Statistics (1945). Village Statistics, April, 1945. Government of Palestine.
- Finn, J. (1877). Byeways in Palestine. Vol. 1. London: James Nisbet & Co.
- Guérin, V. (1880). Description Géographique Historique et Archéologique de la Palestine (in French). Vol. 3: Galilee, pt. 2. Paris: L'Imprimerie Nationale.
- Hadawi, S. (1970). "Village Statistics of 1945: A Classification of Land and Area Ownership in Palestine". Palestine Liberation Organization Research Center. Archived from the original on 8 December 2018.
- Hütteroth, W.-D.; Abdulfattah, K. (1977). Historical Geography of Palestine, Transjordan and Southern Syria in the Late 16th Century. Erlanger Geographische Arbeiten, Sonderband 5. Erlangen, Germany: Vorstand der Fränkischen Geographischen Gesellschaft. ISBN 3-920405-41-2.
- Khalidi, W. (1992). All That Remains:The Palestinian Villages Occupied and Depopulated by Israel in 1948. Washington D.C.: Institute for Palestine Studies. ISBN 0-88728-224-5.
- Mills, E., ed. (1932). Census of Palestine 1931. Population of Villages, Towns and Administrative Areas. Jerusalem: Government of Palestine.
- Morris, B. (2004). The Birth of the Palestinian Refugee Problem Revisited. Cambridge University Press. ISBN 978-0-521-00967-6.
- Palmer, E.H. (1881). The Survey of Western Palestine: Arabic and English Name Lists Collected During the Survey by Lieutenants Conder and Kitchener, R. E. Transliterated and Explained by E.H. Palmer. Committee of the Palestine Exploration Fund.
- Petersen, Andrew (2005). The Towns of Palestine Under Muslim Rule. British Archaeological Reports. ISBN 1841718211.
- Robinson, E.; Smith, E. (1841). Biblical Researches in Palestine, Mount Sinai and Arabia Petraea: A Journal of Travels in the year 1838. Vol. 3. Boston: Crocker & Brewster.
- Rhode, H. (1979). Administration and Population of the Sancak of Safed in the Sixteenth Century. Columbia University. Archived from the original on 1 March 2020.
- Schumacher, G. (1888). "Population list of the Liwa of Akka". Quarterly Statement - Palestine Exploration Fund. 20: 169–191.
- Schwarz, Rabbi Joseph (1850). A descriptive geography and brief historical sketch of Palestine. Isaac Leeser. Philadelphia: A. Hart.
