= Palestinian Arabic =

Dialect of Arabic spoken in Palestine

- اللهجة الفلسطينية
- Native to: Palestine, Israel
- Region: Levant
- Ethnicity: Palestinians
- Native speakers: 6.5 million (2023–2024)
- Language family: Afro-Asiatic: Semitic; West; Central; Arabic; Levantine; South Levantine; Palestinian Arabic
- Dialects: Fellahi Madani Modern Palestinian Judeo-Arabic
- Writing system: Arabic alphabet

Language codes
- ISO 639-3: (covered by apc)
- Glottolog: sout3123
- IETF: apc-PS
- South Levantine

Palestinian Arabic or simply Palestinian is a dialect continuum of mutually-intelligible varieties of Levantine Arabic spoken by Palestinians, indigenous to the Palestine region, which includes the states of Palestine and Israel. It is also spoken by the Palestinian diaspora.

The Arabic dialects spoken in the region of Palestine and Transjordan do not form a homogeneous linguistic unit; rather, they encompass a diverse range of dialects influenced by geographical, historical, and socioeconomic factors. Comparative studies of Arabic dialects indicate that Palestinian Arabic is among the closest dialects to Modern Standard Arabic, particularly the dialect spoken in the Gaza Strip. Additional distinctions can be made within Palestinian Arabic, such as the dialects spoken in the northern West Bank and the Hebron area, which exhibit similarities to those spoken by descendants of Palestinian refugees.

Palestinian Arabic dialects reflect a historical layering of languages previously spoken in the region, including Canaanite, Ancient Hebrew (both Biblical and Mishnaic), Aramaic (especially Western Aramaic), Persian, Greek, and Latin. Furthermore, during the early modern period, these dialects were influenced by Turkish and various European languages. Since the establishment of Israel in 1948, Palestinian Arabic has also been shaped by Modern Hebrew influences.

== History ==
Prior to their adoption of the Arabic language from the seventh century onwards, most of the inhabitants of Palestine spoke varieties of Palestinian Aramaic (Jewish, Christian, and Samaritan) as a native language. Koine Greek was used among the Hellenized elite and aristocracy, and Mishnaic Hebrew for liturgical purposes.

The Negev desert was under the rule of the Nabatean Kingdom for the greater part of Classical antiquity, and included settlements such as Mahoza and Ein-Gedi where Judean and Nabatean populations lived in alongside each other, as documented by the Babatha archive which dates to the second century. The earliest Old Arabic inscription most resembling of Classical Arabic is found in Ayn Avadat, being a poem dedicated to King Obodas I, known for defeating the Hasmonean Alexander Jannaeus. Its date is estimated between 79 and 120 CE, but no later than 150 CE at most.

The Nabataeans tended to adopt Aramaic as a written language as shown in the Nabataean language texts of Petra, as well as a Lingua Franca. Nabatean and Palestinian Aramaic dialects would both have been thought of as “Aramaic”, and almost certainly have been mutually comprehensible. Additionally, occasional Arabic loanwords can be found in the Jewish Aramaic documents of the Dead Sea Scrolls.

The adoption of Arabic among the local population occurred most probably in several waves. After the Early Muslim Arabians took control of the area, so as to maintain their regular activity, the upper classes had to quickly become fluent in the language of the new rulers who most probably were only few. The prevalence of Northern Levantine features in the urban dialects until the early 20th century, as well as in the dialect of Samaritans in Nablus (with systematic imāla (vowel raising) of /a:/) tends to show that a first layer of Arabization of urban upper classes could have led to what is now the Urban Levantine variety. A subsequent phenomenon would have been the slow countryside shift of Aramaic-speaking villages to Arabic under the influence of Arabized elites, leading to the emergence of the rural Palestinian dialects. This scenario is consistent with several facts.

- The rural forms can be correlated with features also observed in the few Syrian villages where use of Aramaic has been retained up to this day. Palatalisation of /k/ (but of /t/ too), pronunciation [kˤ] of /q/ for instance. Note that the first also exists in Najdi Arabic and Gulf Arabic, but is limited to palatal contexts (/k/ followed by i or a). Moreover, those Eastern dialects have [g] or [dʒ] for /q/.
- The less-evolutive urban forms can be explained by a limitation owed to the contacts urban trader classes had to maintain with Arabic speakers of other towns in Syria or Egypt.
- The Negev Bedouin dialect shares a number of features with Bedouin Hejazi dialects (unlike Urban Hejazi).

== Features ==
The dialects spoken by Arabic-speakers in the Eastern Mediterranean, form a group known as Levantine Arabic. Arabic manuals for the "Syrian dialect" were produced in the early 20th century, and in 1909 a specific "Palestinian Arabic" manual was published in Jerusalem for Western travelers.

Palestinian Arabic is a variant of Levantine Arabic because its dialects display characteristic Levantine features:

- A conservative stress pattern, closer to Classical Arabic than anywhere else in the Arab world.
- The indicative imperfect with a b- prefix
- A very frequent Imāla of the feminine ending in front consonant context (names in -eh).
- A [ʔ] realisation of /q/ in the cities, and a [q] realisation of /q/ by the Druze, and more variants (including [k]) in the countryside.
- A shared lexicon

The noticeable differences between southern and northern forms of Levantine Arabic, such as Syrian Arabic and Lebanese Arabic, are stronger in non-urban dialects. The main differences between Palestinian and northern Levantine Arabic are as follows:

- Phonetically, Palestinian dialects differ from Lebanese regarding the classical diphthongs /aj/ and /aw/, which have simplified to [eː] and [oː] in Palestinian dialects as in Western Syrian, while in Lebanese they have retained a diphthongal pronunciation: [eɪ] and [oʊ].
- Palestinian dialects differ from Western Syrian as far as short stressed /i/ and /u/ are concerned: in Palestinian, a more or less open [ɪ] and [ʊ] pronunciation is retained, and not neutralised to [ə] as in Syrian.
- The Lebanese and Syrian dialects are more prone to imāla of /aː/ than the Palestinian dialects. For instance, شتا 'winter' is ['ʃɪta] in Palestinian, but ['ʃəte] in Lebanese and Western Syrian. Some Palestinian dialects ignore imāla totally (e.g. Gaza). Those dialects that prominently demonstrate imāla of /aː/ (e.g. Nablus) are distinctive.
- The plural personal pronouns are إحنا ['ɪħna] 'we'; همه ['hʊmme], [هنه] 'they'; [كو] [ku] كم- [-kʊm] 'you'; هم- [-hʊm] هني [henne] 'them' in Palestinian. This is in contrast to in Syria/Lebanon, where they are نحنا ['nɪħna] 'we'; هنه ['hʊnne] 'they'; كن- [-kʊn] 'you'; هن- [-hʊn] 'them'. The variants كو [-kʊ] 'you', ـهن [-hen] 'them', and هنه ['hʊnne]/هنه [hinne] 'they' are also used in Northern Palestinian.
- The conjugation of the imperfect 1st and 3rd person masculine has different prefix vowels. Palestinians say بَكتب ['baktʊb] 'I write' بَشوف [baʃuːf] 'I see'; whereas Lebanese and Syrians say بِكتب ['bəktʊb] and بْشوف [bʃuːf], respectively. In the 3rd person masculine, Palestinians say بِكتب ['bɪktʊb] 'He writes' where Lebanese and Western Syrians say بيَكتب ['bjəktʊb].
- Hamza-initial verbs commonly have an [oː] prefix sound in the imperfect in Palestinian. For example, Classical Arabic has اكل /akala/ 'to eat' in the perfect tense, and آكل /aːkulu/ with [aː] sound in the first person singular imperfect. The common equivalent in Palestinian Arabic is اكل /akal/ in the perfect, with imperfect 1st person singular بوكل /boːkel/ (with the indicative b- prefix.) Thus, in the Galilee and Northern West Bank, the colloquial for the verbal expression, "I am eating" or "I eat" is commonly ['boːkel] / ['boːtʃel], rather than ['baːkʊl] as used in the Western Syrian dialect. Note however that ['baːkel] or even ['baːkʊl] are used in the South of Palestine.
- The conjugation of the imperative is different too. 'Write!' is اكتب ['ʊktʊb] in Palestinian, but كتوب [ktoːb], with different stress and vowel and length, in Lebanese and Western Syrian.
- For the negation of verbs and prepositional pseudo-verbs, Palestinian, like Egyptian, typically suffixes ش [ʃ] on top of using the preverb negation /ma/, e.g. 'I don't write' is مابكتبش [ma bak'tʊbʃ] in Palestinian, but مابكتب [ma 'bəktʊb] in Northern Levantine (although some areas in southern Lebanon utilise the ش [ʃ] suffix). However, unlike Egyptian, Palestinian allows for ش [ʃ] without the preverb negation /ma/ in the present tense, e.g. بكتبش [bak'tubɪʃ].
- In vocabulary, Palestinian is closer to Lebanese than to Western Syrian, e.g. 'is not' is مش [məʃ] in both Lebanese and Palestinian (although in a few villages مهوش [mahuʃ] and مهيش [mahiʃ], which are found in Maltese and North African dialects, are used) while it is مو [mu] in Syrian; 'How?' is كيف [kiːf] in Lebanese and Palestinian while it is شلون [ʃloːn] in Syrian (though كيف is also used). However, Palestinian also shares items with Egyptian Arabic, e.g. 'like' (prep.) is زي [zejj] in Palestinian in addition to مثل [mɪtl], as found in Syrian and Lebanese Arabic.

There are also typical Palestinian words that are shibboleths compared to other Levantine Arabic dialects:

- The usage of إشي ['ɪʃi] 'thing, something', as opposed to شي [ʃi] in Lebanon and Syria as an indefinite pronoun.
- Instead of the common Levantine هلق ['hallaʔ] 'now', Central Rural dialects around Jerusalem and Ramallah use هالقيت [halkeːt] (although [halʔeːt] is used in some cities such as Tulkarm, Hebron, and Nablus alongside هلق [hallaʔ] (both from هالوقت /halwaqt/) and northern Palestinians use إسا ['ɪssɑ], إساع ['ɪssɑʕ], and هسة [hassɑ] (from الساعة /ɪsːɑːʕɑ/). Villagers in the southern West Bank also use هالحين [halaħin] or هالحينة [halħina] (both from هذا الحين [haːða ‘alħin])
- Some villagers use بقى [baqa] (meaning 'remained' in MSA) as a verb to be alongside the standard كان [kaːn] ([kaːna] in MSA)

== Social and geographic dialect structuration ==
As is very common in Arabic-speaking countries, the Arabic dialect spoken by a person depends on both the region of origin, and socio-economic class. The hikaye, a form of women's oral literature inscribed to UNESCO's list of Intangible Cultural Heritage of Palestine, is recited in both the urban and rural dialects of Palestinian Arabic.

=== Urban varieties ===
The Urban ('madani') dialects resemble closely northern Levantine Arabic dialects, that is, the colloquial variants of western Syria and Lebanon. This fact, that makes the urban dialects of the Levant remarkably homogeneous, is probably due to the trading network among cities in Ottoman Syria, or to an older Arabic dialect layer closer to the North Mesopotamian Arabic (the 'qeltu dialects").

Urban dialects are characterised by the [ʔ] (hamza) pronunciation of ق qaf, the simplification of interdentals as dentals plosives, i.e. ث as [t], ذ as [d] and both ض and ظ as [dˤ]. In borrowings from Modern Standard Arabic, these interdental consonants are realised as dental sibilants, i.e. ث as [s], ذ as [z] and ظ as [zˤ] but ض is kept as [dˤ]; this pattern is similar if not quite identical to the pattern of Egyptian Arabic. The urban dialects also ignore the difference between masculine and feminine in the plural pronouns انتو ['ɪntu] is both 'you' (masc. plur.) and 'you' (fem. plur.), and ['hʊmme] is both 'they' (masc.) and 'they' (fem.)

Druze have a dialect that may be classified with the Urban ones, with the difference that they keep the uvular pronunciation of ق qaf as [q].

==== Sephardi variety ====
As Sephardic Jews were expelled after the conclusion of the Reconquista, they established communities in Ottoman Palestine in Jerusalem and Galilee under the invitation of Sultan Bayezid II. Their Maghrebi Judeo-Arabic dialect mixed with Palestinian Arabic. It peaked at 10,000 speakers and thrived alongside Yiddish among Ashkenazis until the widespread adoption of Modern Hebrew among the Yishuv following its revival in the late 19th century.

Today it is nearly extinct, with only 5 speakers remaining in the Galilee. It contained influence from Judeo-Moroccan Arabic and influence Judeo-Lebanese Arabic and Judeo-Syrian Arabic.

=== Rural varieties ===
Rural ('fallahi') variety is retaining the interdental consonants, and is closely related with rural dialects in Southern Lebanon and the sedentary population east of the Jordan river. They keep the distinction between masculine and feminine plural pronouns, e.g. انتو ['ɪntu] is 'you' (masc.) while انتن ['ɪntɪn] is 'you' (fem.), and همه ['hʊmme] is 'they' (masc.) while هنه ['hɪnne] is 'they' (fem.). The three rural groups in the region are the following:

- North Galilean rural dialect – does not feature the k > tʃ palatalization, and many of them have kept the [q] realisation of ق (e.g. Maghār, Tirat Carmel). In the very north, they announce dialect that is more closely to the Northern Levantine dialects with n-ending pronouns such as كن- [-kʊn] 'you', هن- [-hʊn] 'them' (Tarshiha, etc.).
- Central rural Palestinian (From Nazareth to Bethlehem, including Jaffa countryside) exhibits a very distinctive feature with pronunciation of ك 'kaf' as [tʃ] 'tshaf' (e.g. كفية 'keffieh' as [tʃʊ'fijje]) and ق 'qaf' as pharyngealised /k/ i.e. [kˤ] 'kaf' (e.g. قمح 'wheat' as [kˤɑmᵊħ]). This k > tʃ sound change is not conditioned by the surrounding sounds in Central Palestinian. This combination is unique in the whole Arab world, but could be related to the 'qof' transition to 'kof' in the Aramaic dialect spoken in Ma'loula, north of Damascus.
- Southern outer rural Levantine Arabic (to the south of an Isdud/Ashdod-Bethlehem line) has k > tʃ only in presence of front vowels (ديك 'rooster' is [di:tʃ] in the singular but the plural ديوك 'roosters' is [dju:k] because u prevents /k/ from changing to [tʃ]). In this dialect ق is not pronounced as [k] but instead as [g]. This dialect is actually very similar to northern Jordanian (Ajloun, Irbid) and the dialects of Syrian Hauran. In Southern rural Palestinian, the feminine ending often remains [a].

=== Bedouin variety ===
The Bedouins of Southern Levant use two different ('badawi') dialects in Galilee and the Negev. The Negev desert Bedouins, who are also present in Palestine and Gaza Strip use a dialect closely related to those spoken in the Hijaz, and in the Sinai. Unlike them, the Bedouins of Galilee speak a dialect related to those of the Syrian Desert and Najd, which indicates their arrival to the region is relatively recent. The Negev Bedouins, who ended up around Hebron and Jerusalem after the 1948 Palestine War have a specific vocabulary, where they maintain the interdental consonants, do not use the ش- [-ʃ] negative suffix, always realise ك /k/ as [k] and ق /q/ as [g], and distinguish plural masculine from plural feminine pronouns, but with different forms as the rural speakers.

=== Current evolutions ===
On the urban dialects side, the current trend is to have urban dialects getting closer to their rural neighbours, thus introducing some variability among cities in the Levant. For instance, Jerusalem used to say as Damascus ['nɪħna] ("we") and ['hʊnne] ("they") at the beginning of the 20th century, and this has moved to the more rural ['ɪħna] and ['hʊmme] nowadays. This trend was probably initiated by the partition of the Levant of several states in the course of the 20th century.

The Rural description given above is moving nowadays with two opposite trends. On the one hand, urbanisation gives a strong influence power to urban dialects. As a result, villagers may adopt them at least in part, and Beduin maintain a two-dialect practice. On the other hand, the individualisation that comes with urbanisation make people feel more free to choose the way they speak than before, and in the same way as some will use typical Egyptian or Lebanese features as [le:] for [le:ʃ], others may use typical rural features such as the rural realisation [kˤ] of ق as a pride reaction against the stigmatisation of this pronunciation.

== Phonology ==
=== Consonants ===
		Labial		Interdental		Dental/alveolar		Palatal	Velar		Uvular	Pharyngeal	Glottal
		plain	emph.	plain	emph.	plain	emph.	Palatal	plain	emph.	Uvular	Pharyngeal	Glottal
Nasal		m	mˤ			n							
Stop	voiceless	p				t	tˤ	(t͡ʃ)	k	kˤ	(q)		ʔ
Stop	voiced	b	bˤ			d	dˤ	d͡ʒ	ɡ		(ɢ)		
Fricative	voiceless	f		θ		s	sˤ	ʃ	x ~ χ			ħ	h
Fricative	voiced			ð	ðˤ	z	zˤ	ʒ	ɣ ~ ʁ			ʕ	
Trill						r	rˤ						
Approximant						l	lˤ	j	w				

- /θ, ð, ðˤ, t͡ʃ, d͡ʒ/ are mainly heard in both the rural and Bedouin dialects. In the Gaza dialects, /θ, ð, ðˤ/ are heard as plosives [t, d, dˤ]. /kˤ/ is heard in the rural dialects.
- Sounds /t, k/ are frequently heard as aspirated [tʰ, kʰ] in the Gaza City dialects.
- /zˤ/ and /ʒ/ are mainly heard in the urban dialects.
- /ɡ/ is heard in the Bedouin dialects, and may also be heard as a uvular [ɢ]. In the Gaza City dialects, it may be heard as [ʔ] in free variation among speakers.
- [t͡ʃ] mainly occurs as a palatalization of /k/, and is only heard in a few words as phonemic. In some rural dialects [t͡ʃ] has replaced /k/ as a phoneme.
- /rˤ/ may de-pharyngealize to [r] in certain phonetic environments.
- /χ, ʁ/ can also be heard as velar [x, ɣ] in the dialects of Gaza, and among some rural dialects.
- /q/ exists as a marginal sound from formal Arabic borrowings.
- /b/ can be heard as [p] within devoiced positions.

=== Vowels ===
	Front	Central	Back
Close	i iː		u uː
Mid	e eː		o oː
Open		a aː	

- The short vowel /a/ is typically heard as [ə], when in unstressed form.
- /a, aː/ are heard as [ɑ, ɑː] when following and preceding a pharyngealized consonant. The short vowel /a/ as [ɑ], can also be raised as [ʌ] or [ɐ], in lax form within closed syllables.
- /i, u/ can be lowered to [ɪ, ʊ] when in lax form, or within the position of a post-velar consonant.

== Vocabulary ==
As Palestinian Arabic originated in the heartland of the Semitic languages, it has kept many regular Semitic words. For this reason, it is simple to speculate how Modern Standard Arabic words map onto Palestinian Arabic Words. The Swadesh list of basic words of Palestinian Arabic available on the Wiktionary (see external links below) may be used for this. However, some words are not transparent mappings from MSA, and deserve a description. This is due either to meaning changes in Arabic along the centuries – while MSA keeps the Classical Arabic meanings – or to the adoption of non-Arabic words (see below). Note that this section focuses on Urban Palestinian unless otherwise specified.

=== Prepositional pseudo verbs ===
The words used in Palestinian to express the basic verbs 'to want', 'to have', 'there is/are' are called prepositional pseudo verbs because they share all the features of verbs but are constructed with a preposition and a suffix pronoun.

- there is, there are is فيه [fi] in the imperfect, and كان فيه [ka:n fi] in the perfect.
- To want is formed with bɪdd + suffix pronouns and to have is formed with ʕɪnd + suffix pronouns. In the imperfect they are

Person	To want	To have
I	بدي ['bɪdd-i]	عندي ['ʕɪnd-i]
You (sing. masc.)	بدك ['bɪdd-ak]	عندك ['ʕɪnd-ak]
You (sing. fem.)	بدك ['bɪdd-ɪk]	عندك ['ʕɪnd-ɪk]
He	بده ['bɪdd-o]	عنده ['ʕɪnd-o]
She	بدها ['bɪdd-ha]	عندها ['ʕɪnd-ha]
We	بدنا ['bɪdd-na]	عندنا ['ʕɪnd-na]
You (plur.)	بدكم ['bɪdd-kʊm]	عندكم ['ʕɪnd-kʊm]
They	بدهم ['bɪdd-hʊm]	عندهم ['ʕɪnd-hʊm]

In the perfect, they are preceded by كان [kaːn], e.g. we wanted is كان بدنا [kaːn 'bɪddna].

=== Determiners ===
Relative clauses

As in most forms of colloquial Arabic, the relative clause markers of Classical Arabic (الذي، التي، اللذان، اللتان، الذين and اللاتي) have been simplified to a single form: إللي ['ʔɪlli].

Interrogative pronouns

The main Palestinian interrogative pronouns (with their Modern Standard Arabic counterparts) are the following ones.

Meaning	Palestinian Arabic	MSA
Why?	ليش [leːʃ]	لماذا [limaːðaː]
What?	ايش [ʔeːʃ] or شو [ʃu]	ماذا [maːðaː]
How?	كيف [kiːf]	كيف [kaɪfa]
When?	إيمتى [ʔeːmta] or وينتى [weːnta]	متى [mataː]
Where?	وين [weːn]	اين [ʔaɪna]
Who?	مين [miːn]	من [man]

Note that it is tempting to consider the long [iː] in مين [miːn] 'who?' as an influence of ancient Hebrew מי [miː] on Classical Arabic من [man], but it could be as well an analogy with the long vowels of the other interrogatives.

Marking indirect object

In Classical Arabic, the indirect object was marked with the particle /li-/ ('for', 'to'). For instance 'I said to him' was قلت له ['qultu 'lahu] and 'I wrote to her' was كتبت لها [ka'tabtu la'ha:]. In Palestinian Arabic, the Indirect Object marker is still based on the consonant /l/, but with more complex rules, and two different vocal patterns. The basic form before pronouns is a clitic [ɪll-], that always bears the stress, and to which person pronouns are suffixed. The basic form before nouns is [la]. For instance

- ... قلت لإمك ['ʔʊlət la-'ɪmmak ...] 'I told your mother ...'
- ...اعطينا المكتوب لمدير البنك [ʔɑʕtˤeːna l maktuːb la mʊ'diːɾ ɪl baŋk] 'We gave the letter to the bank manager'
- ... قلت إله [ʔʊlt- 'ɪll-o ...] 'I told him ...'
- ... قلت إلها [ʔʊlt- 'ɪl(l)-ha ...] 'I told her ...'
- ... كتبت إلّي [katabt- 'ɪll-i ...] 'You wrote me ...'

=== Vowel harmony ===
The most often cited example of vowel harmony in Palestinian Arabic is in the present tense conjugations of verbs. If the root vowel is rounded, then the roundness spreads to other high vowels in the prefix. Vowel harmony in PA is also found in the nominal verbal domain. Suffixes are immune to rounding harmony, and vowels left of the stressed syllable do not have vowel harmony.

Palestinian Arabic has a regressive vowel harmony for these present tense conjugations: if the verb stem's main vowel is /u/, then the vowel in the prefix is also /u/, else the vowel is /i/. This is compared with standard Arabic (which can be seen as representative of other Arabic dialects), where the vowel in the prefix is consistently /a/.

Examples:

- ‘he understands’: PA ‘bifham’ (MSA, or standard Arabic ‘yafhamu’)
- ‘he studies’: PA ‘budrus’ (MSA ‘yadrusu’)
- ‘she wears’: PA ‘btilbis’ (MSA ‘talbisu’)
- ‘she writes’: PA ‘btuktub’ (MSA ‘taktubu’)
- ‘oven’: PA ‘furun’ (MSA ‘furn’)
- ‘wedding’: PA ‘Urus’ (MSA ‘urs’)

=== Substratum and loanwords ===
The Ancient peoples of Palestine, as well as their Palestinian successors, have either retained words from the original languages spoken in the land, or borrowed them from other cultures and various imperial rulers they contacted or interacted with throughout history.

==== Semitic ====
===== Biblical Hebrew =====
- سفل sifil (bowl, mug) may be a Canaanite/Hebrew substrate.
- جرجير "arugula" is regionally used in the sense of shrivelled olive. The Hebrew Bible uses it to refer to a grain (berry), while Mishnaic Hebrew used it to refer to both berries and shriveled olives.

===== Western Aramaic =====
Most prominently place names preserved by the inhabitants through the centuries. For instance there are mountains known as جبل الطور ['ʒabal ɪtˤ tˤuːɾ] where طور [tˤuːɾ] is from the Aramaic טור for 'mountain'. There are also agricultural terms borrowed from Aramaice.

===== Modern Hebrew =====
The Arab citizens of Israel especially have adopted many Hebraisms from Hebrew, like yesh יֵשׁ ("we did it!" – used as sports cheer), which has no real equivalent in Arabic. According to sociolinguist David Mendelson from Givat Haviva's Jewish-Arab Center for Peace, there is an adoption of words from Hebrew in Arabic spoken in Israel where alternative native terms exist. According to linguist Mohammed Omara, of Bar-Ilan University some researchers call the Arabic spoken by Israeli Arabs Arabrew (in Hebrew: ערברית Aravrit). The list of words adopted include:

- رمزور [ram'zo:r] from רַמְזוֹר 'traffic light'
- شمنيت ['ʃamenet] from שַׁמֶּנֶת 'sour cream'
- بسدر [be'seder] from בְּסֵדֶר 'O.K, alright'
- كوخفيت [koxa'vi:t] from כּוֹכָבִית 'asterisk'
- بلفون [bele'fo:n] from פֶּלֶאפוֹן 'cellular phone'.

Palestinians in the Palestinian territories sometimes refer to Israeli Arabs as "the b'seder Arabs" because of their adoption of the Hebrew word בְּסֵדֶר [beseder] for 'O.K.', (while in Arabic, this is ماشي [ma:ʃi]). However, words like ramzor רַמְזוֹר 'traffic light' and maḥsom מַחְסוֹם 'roadblock' have become a part of the general Palestinian vernacular.

Interpretations of "Arabrew" are often colored by non-linguistic political and cultural factors, but how contact with Hebrew is realized has been studied, and has been described in linguistic terms and in terms of how it varies. "Arabrew" as spoken by Palestinians and more generally Arab citizens of Israel has been described as classical codeswitching without much structural effect While the codeswitching by the majority of Arab or Palestinian citizens of Israel who are Christian or Muslim from the North or the Triangle is described as limited, more intense codeswitching is seen among Arabs who live in Jewish-majority settlements as well as Bedouin (in the South) who serve in the army, although this variety can still be called codeswitching, and does not involve any significant structural change deviating from the non-Hebrew influenced norm. For the most part among all Christian and Muslim Arabs in Israel, the impact of Hebrew contact on Palestinian Arabic is limited to borrowing of nouns, mostly for specialist vocabulary, plus a few discourse markers. However, this does not apply to the Arabic spoken by the Israeli Druze, which has been documented as manifesting much more intense contact effects, including the mixture of Arabic and Hebrew words within syntactic clauses, such as the use of a Hebrew preposition for an Arabic element and vice versa, and the adherence to gender and number agreement between Arabic and Hebrew elements (i.e. a Hebrew possessive adjective must agree with the gender of the Arabic noun it describes). While Hebrew definite articles can only be used for Hebrew nouns, Arabic definite articles are used for Hebrew nouns and are, in fact, the most common DP structure.

==== Non-Semitic ====
===== Turkic =====
- Oda (اوضا), from Turkish oda (room)
- Kundara (كندرة) from Turkish kundura (shoe)
- Dughri (دُغْرِيّ) from Turkish doğru (straight; forward)
- The -ji suffix (جي-), used to denote professions or characteristics. Examples include kahwaji (café waiter) from Turkish kahveci. Also sufraji, sabonji, etc.

==== Indo-European ====
- Latin such as قصر [ʔasˤɾ], from castrum (castle), and قلم [ʔalam] from calamus (reed pens) which are also known in MSA, but also words such as طاولة [tˤa:wle] from tabula (table), which are known in the Arab world.
- Italian such as بندورة [ban'do:ra], from pomodoro (tomato).
- French such as كتو\غتو [gatto], gâteau (cake).
- English such as بنشر ['banʃar], a reference to tools used to replace flat tires such as tire irons and lug wrenches.

== Media ==
The Gospel of Mark was published in Palestinian Arabic in 1940, with the Gospel of Matthew and the Letter of James published in 1946.

Films which are of Palestinian production often use Palestinian Arabic as the main language.

== See also ==
- Palestinian music
- Levantine Arabic
- Varieties of Arabic
- Demographic history of Palestine (region)
- Arabization
- Arabic language in Israel
  - Academy of the Arabic Language in Israel
