= Targum (disambiguation) =

Targum may mean:

- any of the Aramaic translations of the Bible known as Targumim. Most traditional Jews today focus all their learning of Aramaic texts on Targum Onkelos and on Targum Jonathan .
- in medieval Jewish usage, the Aramaic language in general.
- Targum (Aramaic dialect), sometimes used as a term for certain modern dialects of Judaeo-Aramaic, including that spoken by the Jews of Kurdistan.
- The Daily Targum, official student newspaper of Rutgers University.
- Targum Press, an Orthodox Jewish publishing house.
