= Mizrahi Jews in Israel =

Ethnic group

Regions with significant populations
- Jerusalem, Tel Aviv, Haifa, Be'er Sheva and many other places

Languages
- Hebrew (Main language for all generations); Older generation: Arabic language (Judeo-Arabic languages) and other languages like Judeo-Persian, Kurdish, Georgian, Urdu, Tamil, Malayalam, Marathi, Bukhori, Juhuri

Religion
- Sephardic Judaism, Yemenite Nusach

Mizrahi Jews constitute one of the largest Jewish ethnic divisions among Israeli Jews. Mizrahi Jews are descended from Jews who lived in West Asia, Central Asia, North Africa and parts of the North Caucasus, who had lived for many generations under Muslim rule during the Middle Ages. The vast majority of them left the Muslim-majority countries during the Arab–Israeli conflict, in what is known as the Jewish exodus from Arab and Muslim countries. A 2018 statistic found that 45% of Jewish Israelis identified as either Mizrahi or Sephardic.

== History ==
=== Post-1948 dispersal ===
After the establishment of the State of Israel and subsequent 1948 Arab–Israeli War, nearly all Mizrahi Jews were either expelled by their Arab rulers or chose to leave and emigrated to Israel. According to the 2009 Statistical Abstract of Israel by Israel Central Bureau of Statistics; 2,043.8 thousand Israeli Jews were Israel-born (father born in Israel), 681.4 thousand were from other Asian countries (including 95.6 thousand from India and Pakistan), 859.1 thousand were from African countries (including 106.9 thousand from Ethiopia), and 1,939.4 thousand were from Europe, America or Oceania.

Anti-Jewish actions by Arab governments in the 1950s and 1960s, in the context of the founding of the State of Israel, led to the departure of large numbers of Mizrahi Jews from the Middle East. 25,000 Mizrahi Jews from Egypt left after the 1956 Suez Crisis. They became refugees and most went to Israel.

Today, as many as 40,000 Mizrahi Jews still remain in communities scattered throughout the non-Arab Muslim world, primarily in Iran, but also Uzbekistan, Azerbaijan, and Turkey.

=== Population in Israel ===
Some 607,900 Israeli Jews are immigrants and first-generation descendants by paternal lineage of Moroccan, Tunisian, Libyan, Algerian, Yemenite, Iranian, Egyptian, Kurdish, Afghan, Pakistani, Indian and Turkish Jewish communities. Many more Israeli Jews are second and third generation Mizrahi descendants or have a partial Mizrahi origin. The other dominant sub-groups are the Israeli Ashkenazi Jews and Sephardic Jews. Often Mizrahi and North African Sephardic Jews in Israel are grouped together due to the similarity of their history under Muslim rule and an overwhelming migration out of their countries of residence during the 20th century.

=== Absorption into Israeli society ===
Refuge in Israel was not without its tragedies: "in a generation or two, millennia of rooted Oriental civilization, unified even in its diversity," had been wiped out, writes Mizrahi scholar Ella Shohat. The trauma of rupture from their countries of origin was further complicated by the difficulty of the transition upon arrival in Israel; Mizrahi immigrants and refugees were placed in rudimentary and hastily erected tent cities (Ma'abarot) often in development towns on the peripheries of Israel. Settlement in Moshavim (cooperative farming villages) was only partially successful, because Mizrahim had historically filled a niche as craftsmen and merchants and most did not traditionally engage in farmwork. As the majority left their property behind in their home countries as they journeyed to Israel, many suffered a severe decrease in their socio-economic status aggravated by their cultural and political differences with the dominant Ashkenazi community. Furthermore, a policy of austerity was enforced at that time due to economic hardships.

Mizrahi immigrants arrived with many mother tongues. Many, especially those from North Africa and the fertile crescent, spoke Arabic dialects; those from Iran spoke Persian; Mountain Jews from Azerbaijan, Chechnya and Dagestan arrived with Azerbaijani, Russian and Juhuri; Indian Jews from India arrived with English; Bukharan Jews from Uzbekistan and Tajikistan arrived with Bukhari; the Bene Israel from Maharashtra, India arrived with Marathi, Georgian Jew and Judaeo-Georgian, Jews from various other places brought various other languages with them. Hebrew had historically been a language only of prayer for most Jews not living in Israel, including the Mizrahim. Thus, with their arrival in Israel, the Mizrahim retained culture, customs and language distinct from their Ashkenazi counterparts.

==== Disparities and integration ====
The cultural differences between Mizrahi and Ashkenazi Jews impacted the degree and rate of assimilation into Israeli society, and sometimes the divide between Eastern European and Middle Eastern Jews was quite sharp. Segregation, especially in the area of housing, limited integration possibilities over the years.

From the 1980s onward, Mizrahim began moving out of the socioeconomic periphery and toward the center. By the close of the 20th century, it could be said that the Mizrahim overall had only started to close the gap with Ashkenazim in two social fields: small business ownership, and politics. The petit-bourgeois private enterprise sector was the first site of Mizrahi success, perhaps because it bypassed higher education, while Mizrahi advances in politics came as the political scene in Israel underwent various successive transformations and Mizrahim claimed a critical role in ensuring the success of the right-wing Likud party. Although Mizrahim raised their education level, so did Ashkenazim, and gaps in many trained sectors of the economy, as well as average income, persisted; a third of Mizrahim had joined the so-called "Mizrahi middle class" which had closed ranks with Ashkenazim socioeconomically, and most of these tended to be Mizrahim from earlier emigration waves from Asia. Whereas Mizrahim from Asia came at earlier times and settled in the center of the country, Mizrahim and Sefardim from North Africa came later and settled in the "development towns". By the end of the 20th century, the Mizrahis of Asian origin had integrated much more closely with the Ashkenazim socioeconomically than those of North African origin. The shift of Mizrahim out of the lower percentiles of the economy began in 1979, became palpable in 1989–1999, and accelerated in 1999–2009. By 2015, while native-born Israelis of Ashkenazi origin had incomes 31% above the national average, Mizrahim were lower but above average by 14%, while the more recent Soviet Jewry arrivals had average incomes, while Arabs earned two-thirds the national average and Ethiopian Israelis earned barely half the average income.

Intermarriage between Ashkenazim and Mizrahim is increasingly common in Israel and by the late 1990s 28% of all Israeli children had multi-ethnic parents (up from 14% in the 1950s). It has been claimed that intermarriage does not tend to decrease ethnic differences in socio-economic status, however that does not apply to the children of inter-ethnic marriages.

Although social integration is constantly improving, disparities persist. According to a study conducted by the Israeli Central Bureau of Statistics (ICBS), Mizrahi Jews are less likely to pursue academic studies than Ashkenazi Jews. Israeli-born Ashkenazim are up to twice more likely to study at a university than Israeli-born Mizrahim. Furthermore, the percentage of Mizrahim who seek a university education remains low compared to second-generation immigrant groups of Ashkenazi origin, such as the descendants of Soviet Jewish immigrants. The average income of Ashkenazim was 36 percent higher than that of Mizrahim in 2004.

=== Politics ===
The first identifiable Mizrahi politics was on the left, and arose in response to the marginalization of Mizrahim within Israeli society. It was shaped by the Rainbow Alliance and the Israeli Black Panthers, explicitly inspired by the American Black Panthers. However, beginning in the 1970s, Mizrahi allegiances began to shift rightward. Today, the Ashkenazi vote is associated with left-wing, secular and centrist parties (especially Blue and White, Meretz, Kadima and historically Labour), and the majority of Mizrahim vote for right-wing parties, especially Likud, as well as the Mizrahi-oriented splinter party Shas.

Mizrahim were a crucial pillar of Likud since its founding in the 1970s, even though the party leadership was dominated by Ashkenazim at first. Despite the increasing dominance of Mizrahi political articulation within Likud and its reliance on Mizrahi votes, there has not yet been a Mizrahi prime minister of Israel. The rightward shift of Mizrahi politics started with early Likud leader Menachem Begin enthusiastically making overtures to the community, though not Mizrahi himself. However, the association of Ashkenazim with the left and Mizrahim with the right was not yet fully crystallized at that time; it sharpened considerably beginning in 1980.

Mizrahim have become the core of support for Benjamin Netanyahu, who is known for championing Mizrahi causes. The rise of Likud from 1977 onward is nearly "universally" attributed to shifts among Mizrahi voters. By May 1977, the share of Mizrahim in the party's Central Committee grew from 10% to 50%. Meir Kahane's far-right Kach party as it emerged in the 1980s which called for the transfer of Arabs also won most of its support in economically depressed areas that tended to be Mizrahi, which Peled argues is best explained by labor market rivalries between Mizrahim and Arabs. The robustness of support among Mizrahi Israelis for Netanyahu has been credited for his political survival despite a string of scandals, court investigations, and very close elections. Likud's electoral success in 2020 has hinged on turnout in its strongholds in Beersheba and a string of northern towns inhabited by Mizrahim, while in 2015 likewise Likud was carried to victory by a wave of turnout in working-class, predominantly Mizrahi "development towns", and because this occurred in response to Netanyahu's warning about Arab voters coming out in "droves", it led to a low level wave of ethnic tensions, with mutual accusations of racism between left-wing Ashkenazi figures and their right-wing Mizrahi counterparts. Nevertheless, the Mizrahi vote for Likud has not always been fixed, and in 1992 Labor's victory is attributed in a large part to flipping Mizrahi former Likud voters.

Whereas Ashkenazi prominence on the left has historically been associated with socialist ideals that had emerged in Central Europe and the kibbutz and Labor Zionist movement, the Mizrahim, as they rose in society and they developed their political ideals, often rejected ideologies they associated with an "Ashkenazi elite" that had marginalized them. Although these tensions were initially based on economic rivalries, the distinction remained strong even as Mizrahim increasingly moved up the socioeconomic ladder around 1990, entering the middle class, and the disparity between Ashkenazim and Mizrahim diminished (but did not completely disappear), with Mizrahi political expression becoming increasingly linked to the Likud and Shas parties. Likud, the largest right-wing party in Israel, became increasingly influenced by Mizrahi political articulation, with the Mizrahi middle class' political coming-of-age held by political science commentators to be embodied by the rise of Mizrahi Likud politicians such as Moshe Kahlon and Miri Regev.

The Shas party was founded, as a splinter from Likud, to explicitly represent religious Mizrahi interests, as well as general Mizrahi interest, both vis-a-vis the Ashkenazi-dominated socioeconomic elite of Israel as well as the Arab states; Shas has campaigned for compensation for Jewish refugees from Arab countries. In the 1990s there was a "surge of memory" regarding the events of the 1950s, which challenged the prior "Eurocentric" focus of Ashkenazi experiences by popularizing a new narrative that centers the Mizrahi Israeli's experience as relevant to national identity.

The Mizrahi turn to the right has been analyzed from many viewpoints. Some consider it a result of the failure of Ashkenazi progressive elites to adequately tackle racism against Mizrahim within their organizations. On the other hand, many Mizrahim came to credit Likud with their socioeconomic advancement, with Likud centers serving as hiring halls. Some models have also emphasized economic competition between Arabs and Mizrahim. However, other analysts partially or mainly reject the economic explanation, arguing that instead cultural and ideological factors play a key role. Whereas Ashkenazi Israelis tend to support left-wing politics, secularism, and peace with Arab peoples, the Mizrahim tend on average to be more conservative, and tend toward being "traditionally" religious with fewer secular or ultra-religious (Haredi) individuals; they are also more skeptical of prospects for peace with Palestinian Arabs. The skepticism towards the peace process among Mizrahim may be tied to a history of mistreatment by Muslim and Christian Arabs from when they were in diaspora in Arab countries, though many doubt that this alone is sufficiently explanatory.

The greater support among Mizrahim compared to Ashkenazim (48% versus 35% as measured by Pew in 2016) for the settlements in the West Bank has also been attributed to economic incentives and the fact that many working-class Mizrahim live in large "seam zone" towns, often in subsidized housing. Another contributing factor is religious views among some Mizrahim who join the settlements. Although Mizrahim formed a considerable portion of the settler population, with a particular concentration in and around Gush Katif (evacuated in 2005 and resettled within Israel), they were often ignored by public discourse about the settlements which tended to incorrectly paint all or most "seam zone" towns as having Ashkenazi national-religious origins, which a disproportionately large but still minority portion do.

Mizrahi alignment to Likud and other right-wing parties is far from homogeneous, however, and has not stopped the success of cultural transformations among Israeli Mizrahi as a result of social movements that were first supported mainly by the left, such as greater tolerance toward LGBT rights and culture, and increasing acknowledgement of the LGBT Mizrahi experience. Mizrahim who stayed in Likud and did not join Shas may have played a role in checking the trend toward ultra-Orthodoxy. The Kulanu party, founded by Moshe Kahlon and Avi Gabbay (who would later join Labour), appeals to Sephardi and Mizrahi middle class, from a center to center right position. By the 2010s, all parts of the political spectrum, not just the centre-right, were giving increasing focus on the Mizrahi perspective, with some identifying a resulting trend of orientalization of Israeli public discourse. The trend is also seen in Israeli popular art and music, where an earlier renaissance in Mizrahi expression has now entered and transformed mainstream artistic expression in Israel. The orientalization of Israeli identity and discourse and the shift from a society aiming to emulate Europe to one identifying itself as Middle Eastern is increasingly being embraced by the younger generation of Ashkenazim as well, especially on the left.

== Memorialization in Israel ==
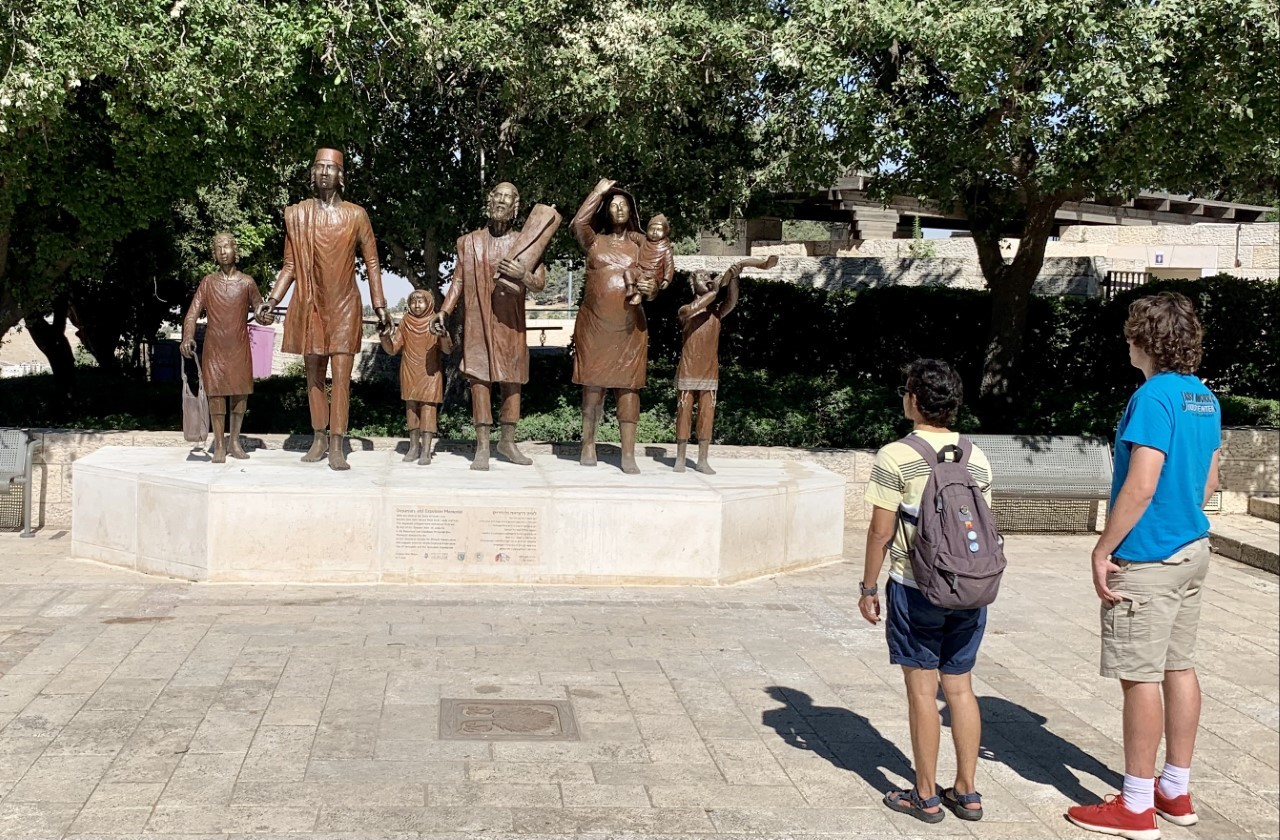
Jewish Departure and Expulsion Memorial from Arab Lands and Iran on the Sherover Promenade, Jerusalem

May 9, 2021, the first physical memorialization in Israel of the Departure and Expulsion of Jews from Arab land and Iran was placed on the Sherover Promenade in Jerusalem. It is titled the Departure and Expulsion Memorial following the Knesset law for the annual recognition of the Jewish experience held annually on November 30.

The text on the Memorial reads;

With the birth of the State of Israel, over 850,000 Jews were forced from Arab Lands and Iran. The desperate refugees were welcomed by Israel.

By Act of the Knesset: Nov. 30, annually, is the Departure and Expulsion Memorial Day. Memorial donated by the Jewish American Society for Historic Preservation, With support from the World Sephardi Federation, City of Jerusalem and the Jerusalem Foundation

The sculpture is the interpretive work of Sam Philipe, a fifth generation Jerusalemite.

== Notable people ==
- Eyal Golan – Mizrahi singer
- Robert Tiviaev – politician, Mountain Jew, former member of Knesset for Kadima. Born in Dagestan.
- Dalya Itzik – politician, former member of the Knesset for Kadima
- Yitzhak Mordechai – former general and former politician
- Michael Ben-Ari – politician and former member of the Knesset
- Mordechai Zar – politician and former member of the Knesset
- Moshe Katsav – Former President of Israel (2000–2007)
- Shaul Mofaz – Former Israeli Minister of Defense, currently number two on the Kadima list in the Knesset
- Gila Gamliel – Member of the Knesset for Likud and minister
- Pe'er Tasi – singer
- Yitzhak Tshuva – business magnate
- Zadik Bino – businessman
- Haim Saban – businessman, philanthropist
- Moshe Kahlon – politician, former Minister of Finance
- Aryeh Deri – politician, Minister of Interior and Minister for the Development of the Negev and Galilee
- Esther Ofarim – Musician
- Dudu Tassa – Musician

== See also ==
- Aliyah
- Arab Jews
- Arabic language in Israel
- Day to mark the departure and expulsion of Jews from the Arab lands and Iran
- Jewish ethnic divisions
- Racism in Israel
- Wadi Salib riots
