= Ashkenazi Jews in Israel =

Ethnic Group in Israel

Total population
- 2.8 million (full or partial Ashkenazi Jewish descent)

Regions with significant populations
- Jerusalem, Tel Aviv, Haifa and many other places

Languages
- Hebrew (main language for all generations); Older generation: Yiddish, Russian, Polish and other languages of countries that Ashkenazi Jews came from

Religion
- Judaism

Ashkenazi Jews in Israel refers to immigrants and descendants of Ashkenazi Jews, who now reside within the state of Israel, in the modern sense also referring to Israeli Jewish adherents of the Ashkenazi Jewish tradition. As of 2013, they number 2.8 million and constitute one of the largest Jewish ethnic divisions in Israel, in line with Mizrahi and Sephardi Jews. Ashkenazim, excluding those who migrated from the former USSR, are estimated to be 31.8% of the Israeli Jewish population in 2018.

Ashkenazi Jews are Jews whose ancestors had settled in Central and Eastern Europe, not to be confused with Sephardi Jews who are those that originally settled in Spain and Portugal.

== History ==
Ashkenazi Jews were first said to live in the Land of Israel in the 11th century, according to 16th-century mystic Rabbi Elijah of Chelm. Further evidence of Ashkenazi communities in the holy city comes in the form of halakhic questions sent from Germany to Jerusalem during the second half of the 11th century. Additional Ashkenazim arrived to the region during the Aliyah of the Tosafists in the thirteenth century. By the late-fourteenth century, the Ashkenazi population in Jerusalem had grown, and a yeshiva for them was established by Isaac Asir HaTikvah. They prayed in the same synagogue as the Sephardim. Additional European Jews arrived in the 15th century, such as Elijah of Ferrara. In the 18th century, Hasidim moved to Jerusalem, many led by Judah HeHasid. A further wave of immigrants, known as Perushim, arrived in the 19th century.

=== Modernity ===
Jews of mixed background are increasingly common, partly because of intermarriage between Ashkenazi and Sephardi/Mizrahi, and partly because many do not see such historic markers as relevant to their life experiences as Jews.

The Ashkenazi Chief Rabbi of Israel is an honored leadership role given to a respected Ashkenazi rabbi. The Chief Rabbi may make determinations regarding matters of halakha that affect the public and this position also has political overtones. Some religiously affiliated Ashkenazi Jews in Israel may be more likely to support certain religious interests in Israel, including certain political parties. These political parties result from the fact that a portion of the Israeli electorate votes for Jewish religious parties; although the electoral map changes from one election to another, there are generally several small parties associated with the interests of religious Ashkenazi Jews. The role of religious parties, including small religious parties that play important roles as coalition members, results in turn from Israel's composition as a complex society in which competing social, economic, and religious interests stand for election to the Knesset, a unicameral legislature with 120 seats.

In 2018, 31.8% of Israeli Jews self-identified as Ashkenazi, excluding the 12.4% immigrants from the former USSR, a majority of whom self-identify as Ashkenazi. They have played a prominent role in the economy, media, and politics of Israel since its founding. During the first decades of Israel as a state, strong cultural conflict occurred between Sephardic and Ashkenazi Jews (mainly east European Ashkenazim). Sephardic groups were largely marginalized, dominated politically, culturally, and economically through Ashkenazi dominated institutions. Geographically, the two groups were separated, as Sephardic Jews were settled in peripheral "development towns" and frontier areas with limited resources. The roots of this conflict, which still exists to a much smaller extent in present-day Israeli society, are chiefly attributed to the concept of the "melting pot". Sephardi language, traditions, and identities were suppressed in favor of Ashkenazi norms. That is to say, all Jewish immigrants who arrived in Israel were strongly encouraged to "melt down" their own particular exilic identities within the general social "pot" in order to become Israeli.

== Political trends ==
The majority of Ashkenazim in Israel today tend to vote for left-wing and centrist parties, favoring especially Blue and White and Yesh Atid, while other Jewish subdivisions such as Mizrahi Jews in Israel tend to favor more right-wing parties such as Likud, with the distinction sharpening since 1980. Ashkenazi prominence on the left has historically been associated with socialist ideals that had emerged in Central Europe and the kibbutz and Labor Zionist movements; while Mizrahim, as they rose in society and they developed their political ideals, often rejected ideologies they associated with an "Ashkenazi elite." Instead, from the 1970s, Mizrahim began to flood into the ranks of Likud in response to Menachem Begin enthusiastically making overtures to the community, despite not being Mizrahi himself. Although these tensions were initially based on economic rivalries, the distinction remained strong even as Mizrahim increasingly moved up the socioeconomic ladder around 1990, entering the middle class, and the disparity between Ashkenazim and Mizrahim diminished (but did not completely disappear), with Mizrahi political expression becoming increasingly linked to the Likud and Shas parties; Shas was founded as a party to represent Mizrahim while Likud, the largest right-wing party, in Israel became increasingly influenced by Mizrahi political articulation, with the Mizrahi middle class' political coming-of-age held by political science commentators to be embodied by the rise of Mizrahi Likud politicians such as Moshe Kahlon and Miri Regev. The Ashkenazi vote has, aside from electorally limited majority-Ashkenazi ultra-religious parties such as Habayit Hayehudi and UTJ, long been associated with secularism and social liberalism and Ashkenazi Israelis are overall less devout, more socially liberal, and have more favorable opinions towards improving relations with Arab peoples, and greater opposition to settlements in the West Bank, than Israelis of Sephardic and Mizrahi extraction. Today, the most influential party among Ashkenazi Israelis appears to be Blue and White.

== Notable people ==
- Chaim Weizmann – first President of Israel (1949–52)
- Yitzhak Ben-Zvi – first elected/second president President of Israel (1952–63)
- David Ben-Gurion – first Prime Minister of Israel (1948–54, 1955–63)
- Moshe Sharett – prime minister (1954–55)
- Levi Eshkol – prime minister (1963–69)
- Golda Meir – prime minister (1969–74)
- Yitzhak Rabin – prime minister (1974–77, 1992–95); Nobel Peace Prize (1994) (assassinated November 1995)
- Menachem Begin – prime minister (1977–83); Nobel Peace Prize (1978)
- Yitzhak Shamir – prime minister (1983–84, 1986–92)
- Shimon Peres – President of Israel (2007–2014); prime minister (1984–86, 1995–96); Nobel Peace Prize (1994)
- Benjamin Netanyahu – prime minister (1996–99, 2009–21, 2022-present); was minister of finance; Likud party chairman
- Ehud Barak – prime minister (1999–01)
- Ariel Sharon – prime minister (2001–06)
- Ehud Olmert – prime minister (2006–09); former mayor of Jerusalem
- Rehavam Zeevi – founder of the Moledet party (assassinated October 2001)
- Yossi Beilin – leader of the Meretz-Yachad party and peace negotiator
- Yosef Lapid – former leader of the Shinui party
- Teddy Kollek – former mayor of Jerusalem
- Shulamit Aloni - former minister
- Shelly Yachimovich - former leader of the opposition
- Miriam Feirberg
- Yael German
- Gilad Erdan

== See also ==
- Aliyah
- Yiddish language
- Jewish ethnic divisions
