= Arabic language in Israel =

Presence and role of Arabic in Israel

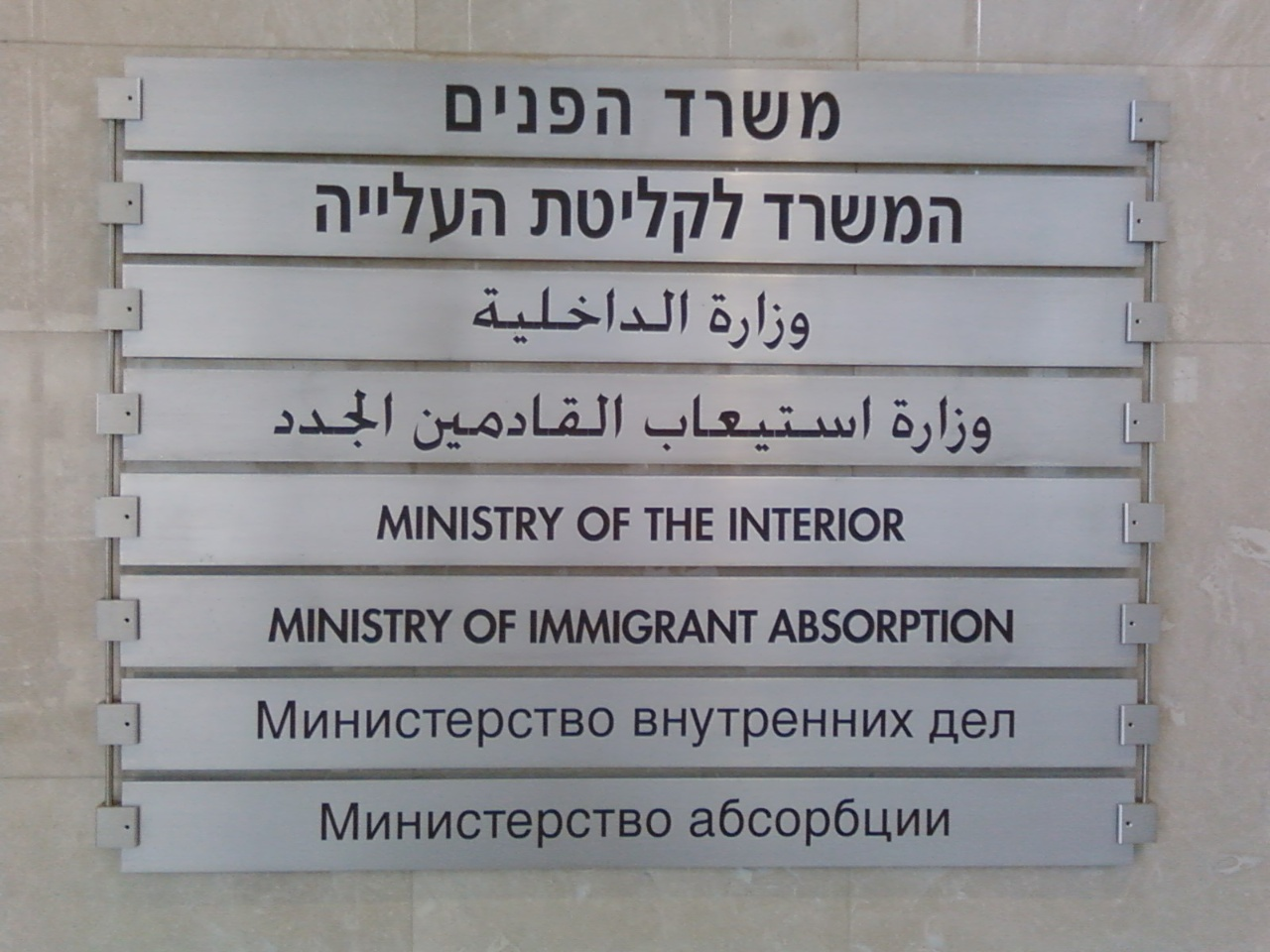
A multilingual (Hebrew, Arabic, English, and Russian) sign at the Ministry of the Interior/Ministry of Immigrant Absorption in Haifa.

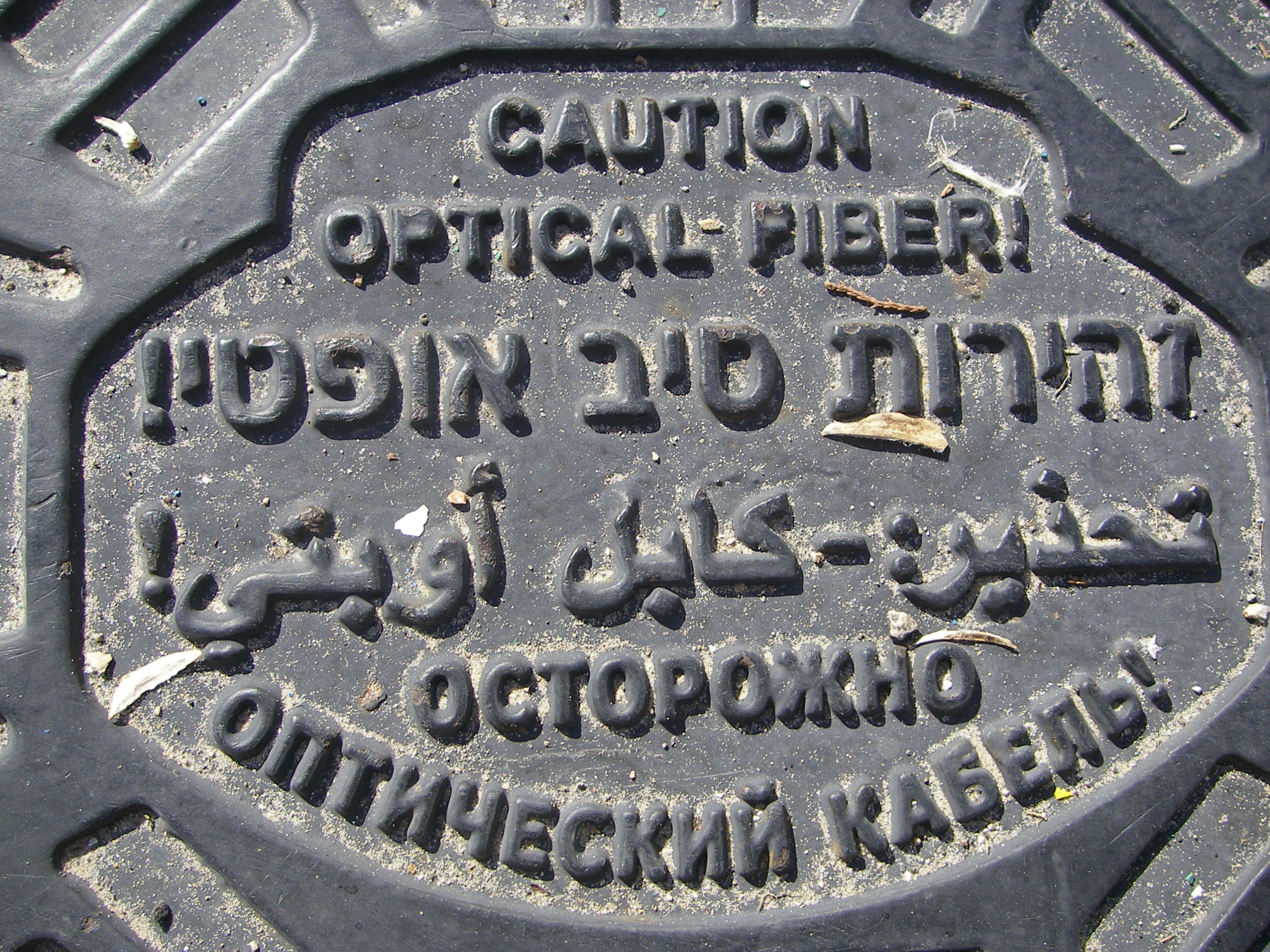
The multilingual warning (English, Hebrew, Arabic and Russian) on the optical cable manhole cover in Tel Aviv.

An Israeli road sign in Hebrew, Arabic, and English. On some road signs (such as the ones above), the Arabic and English are transliterations of the Hebrew place names. On others, the local Arabic or conventional English names are used.

In Israel, Arabic is spoken natively by over 20 percent of the Israeli population by Arab citizens of Israel. Historically, various versions of Arabic were also spoken by Jews who arrived in Israel from Arab countries in the mid-20th century. Some refer to the modern Hebrew-influenced Levantine Arabic vernacular as the "Israeli Arabic dialect" or colloquially as Aravrit, a portmanteau of the Hebrew words Ivrit (lit. 'Hebrew') and Aravit (lit. 'Arabic').

Among Israeli Arabs in central Israel, the vernacular spoken is similar to Palestinian Arabic, while the Negev Bedouin traditionally speak their own dialect of Arabic. The dialects in the northern part of the country merge with southern Lebanese Arabic. Many first-generation Mizrahi Jews and Maghrebi Jews (i.e. those who made aliyah to Israel from the Arab world) can still speak Judeo-Arabic dialects, while their Israel-born descendants have overwhelmingly adopted Hebrew as their first (or sole) language.

Before 1948, the official languages of the British mandate of Palestine were English, Hebrew, and Arabic. After Israel's establishment in 1948, English was removed as an official language, leaving Hebrew and Arabic as co-official languages. The 2018 Nation-State Law declared Hebrew as the "state's language" and Arabic as a language that has "a special status in the state" whose use "in state institutions or by them will be set in law." It also stated "this clause does not harm the status given to the Arabic language before this law came into effect." Using Arabic in government documents and in the public sphere is still mandated under Israeli law and affirmed by Israel's Supreme Court.

== History ==
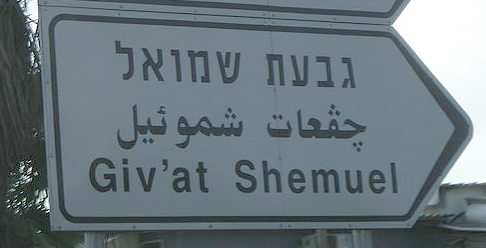
The initial form of چ used to represent /ɡ/ and ڤ for /v/ in an Israeli road sign on the road to Giv'at Shmuel.

Modern Standard Arabic (also known as Standard Arabic or Literary Arabic), is currently an auxiliary language in Israel and its use on government documents is mandated by law. Spoken Arabic dialects are spoken primarily by Arab citizens of Israel including the Israeli Druze, as well as by some Mizrahi Jews, particularly those of the older generation who immigrated from Arabic-speaking countries. In 1949, 156,000 Palestinian Arabs were left inside Israel's armistice line, most of whom did not speak Hebrew. Today the majority of Arab Israelis, who constitute over a fifth of the Israeli population, speak Hebrew fluently, as a second language.

For many years the Israeli authorities were reluctant to use Arabic, except when explicitly ordered by law (for example, in warnings on dangerous chemicals), or when addressing the Arabic-speaking population. This has changed following a November 2000 Supreme Court ruling which ruled that although second to Hebrew, the use of Arabic should be much more extensive. Since then, all road signs, food labels, and messages published or posted by the government must also be translated into Literary Arabic, unless being issued by the local authority of an exclusively Hebrew-speaking community.

Arabic was always considered a legitimate language for use in the Knesset, but only rarely have Arabic-speaking Knesset members made use of this right, as the majority of the members of Knesset are not sufficiently fluent in Arabic. In 2022, due to the unique makeup of the governing coalition, the leader of the Arab party Ra'am was acting as speaker while the opposition Arab Joint List was criticizing a piece of legislation. This led to all present MKs being Arab, and as such only Arabic was used in the debate.

Arabic lessons are widespread in Hebrew-speaking schools in the seventh through ninth grades. Those who wish to do so may opt to continue their Arabic studies through the twelfth grade and take an Arabic matriculation exam. Many students who graduate high school with a high level of proficiency in Arabic are placed in positions in the army where they can utilize this language.

Arabic courses are widespread in the Israel Defense Forces, where all soldiers are required to learn how to de-escalate potential terror attacks in both Hebrew and Arabic. Combat soldiers who are placed in parts of the West Bank and who deal with the civilian population on a daily basis are often sent to brief Arabic courses and Arabic use is widespread in all military intelligence positions.

Israel's large population of Arabic-speakers, its location in the Middle East, decades of globalization, and the Mizrahi heritage of the majority of Israel's Jewish population have all influenced spoken Hebrew in Israel. After Hebrew and English, Arabic songs (sung both by native Arab speakers and by Mizrahi Israelis) are frequently played on the radio. A-WA's debut single, Habib-Galbi, released in 2015, was the first Arabic language song to reach number 1 on Israeli radio and Arabic plays a very prominent role in the "slang" (street language) of Israel's youth.

In addition, when Eliezer Ben Yehuda, the pioneer of the Hebrew language's modern revival, began creating new Hebrew words to adapt to the modern world, he preferred borrowing words from Arabic and Aramaic (both Semitic languages, like Hebrew) than languages that were more linguistically removed from Hebrew. This modern revival, in addition to living in close contact and subsequent borrowing of loanwords and slang, have resulted in striking similarities in the two language's grammar and vocabulary.

In March 2007, the Knesset approved a new law calling for the establishment of an Arabic Language Academy similar to the Academy of the Hebrew Language. This institute was established in 2008, its center is in Haifa and it is currently headed by Mahmud Ghanayem.

In 2009, Israel Katz, the transport minister, announced that signs on all major roads in Israel, East Jerusalem and possibly parts of the West Bank would be amended, replacing English and Arabic place names with straight transliterations of the Hebrew name. Currently most road signs are in all three languages. Nazareth, for example, would become "Natzrat". The Ministry of Transport (MOT) said signs would be replaced gradually as necessary due to wear and tear, but the proposal as a whole was criticized as an attempt by the Israeli government to erase the Arabic language and Palestinian heritage in Israel. In 2011, Israel's governmental names' committee unanimously rejected the MOT's proposal.

== Dialects ==
The Arab population of Israel can be grouped into three main clusters of Arabic dialects. Among Israeli Arabs in central Israel, the vernacular spoken is similar to Palestinian Arabic, while Bedouin traditionally speak their own dialect of Arabic. The northern part of the country merges with Lebanese Arabic (Central Northern Levantine Arabic). The Druze Arabic dialect, especially in the villages, is often different from the other regional Israeli Arabic dialects. Druze Arabic dialect is distinguished from others by retention of the phoneme /q/.

Many first-generation Mizrahi Jews in Israel and North African Sephardi Jews can still speak Judeo-Arabic languages, while their Israeli-born descendants have overwhelmingly adopted Hebrew as their first (or sole) language.

== See also ==
- Languages of Israel
- Arab citizens of Israel
- Judeo-Arabic languages
