= Day to Mark the Departure and Expulsion of Jews from the Arab Countries and Iran =

Remembrance day

- Official name: יום לציון היציאה והגירוש של היהודים מארצות ערב ומאיראן
- Observed by: Israel
- Type: Annual national commemoration
- Significance: Memorializes the departure and expulsion of over 850,000 Mizrahi and Sephardic Jews from the Middle East
- Observances: State ceremonies and educational programs
- Date: November 30
- First time: 2014

The Day to Mark the Departure and Expulsion of Jews from the Arab Countries and Iran (Hebrew: יוֹם לְצִיּוֹן הָיְצִיאָה וְהַגִירוּשׁ שֶׁל הַיְהוּדִים מֵאַרְצוֹת עֲרָב וּמְאִירָאן, romanized: Yōm ləṢīyyōn haYəṣīʾā vəhaGīrūš šel haYəhūdīm məʾArṣōt ʿĂrāv ūməʾĪrāʾn) is a National Day of Commemoration in Israel, observed every year on November 30 to memorialize the Jewish exodus from the Muslim world.

The commemoration is unofficially referred to as "Day of The Refugees" (Hebrew: יום הפליטים, romanized: Yom HaPlitim) or "Day of The Expulsion" (Hebrew: יום הגירוש, romanized: Yom HaGirush).

== Background ==
The Knesset adopted the commemoration day into law on June 23, 2014. November 30th was chosen due to its symbolic proximity to the United Nations Partition Plan for Palestine – adopted on November 29, 1947 – after which many Mizrahi Jews in Middle Eastern and North African countries started to experience pressure and hostility from their Arab and Persian neighbors that ultimately resulted in a large scale exodus of Jewish communities from these countries. The law was sponsored by MK Shimon Ohayon of Yisrael Beiteinu.

For many Mizrahi Jews in Israel, it is considered belated recognition of a collective trauma long ignored throughout the country's history. Professor Henry Alan Green has advocated to make it an annual commemoration in Jewish communities worldwide, in a similar way to Yom ha-Shoah commemorations. He said the event marks "the ethnic cleansing of one million Jews in one generation".

== Memorial ==
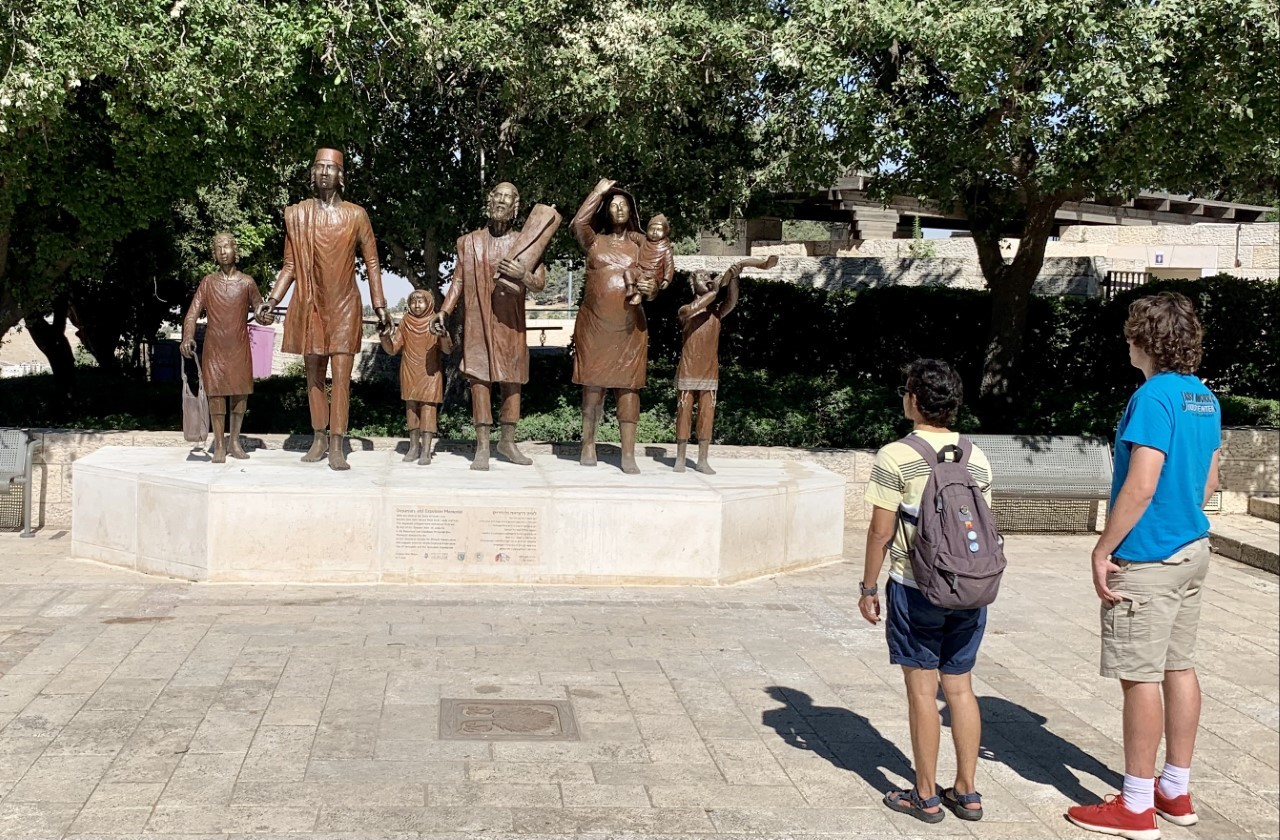
Jewish Departure and Expulsion Memorial from Arab Lands and Iran on the Sherover Promenade, Jerusalem

On May 9, 2021, the first physical memorial for the Day to Mark the Departure and Expulsion of Jews from the Arab Countries and Iran was placed on the Sherover Promenade in Jerusalem. The memorial reads:

With the birth of the State of Israel, over 850,000 Jews were forced from Arab Lands and Iran. The desperate refugees were welcomed by Israel.

The sculpture is the interpretive work of Sam Philipe, a fifth generation Jerusalemite. The memorial was donated by the Jewish American Society for Historic Preservation, with support from the World Sephardi Federation, City of Jerusalem and the Jerusalem Foundation.

== See also ==
- Day of Revenge
- Jewish exodus from the Muslim world
- Mizrahi Jews in Israel
- Nakba Day
