= Shimon Ohayon =

Israeli politician and professor

- שמעון אוחיון
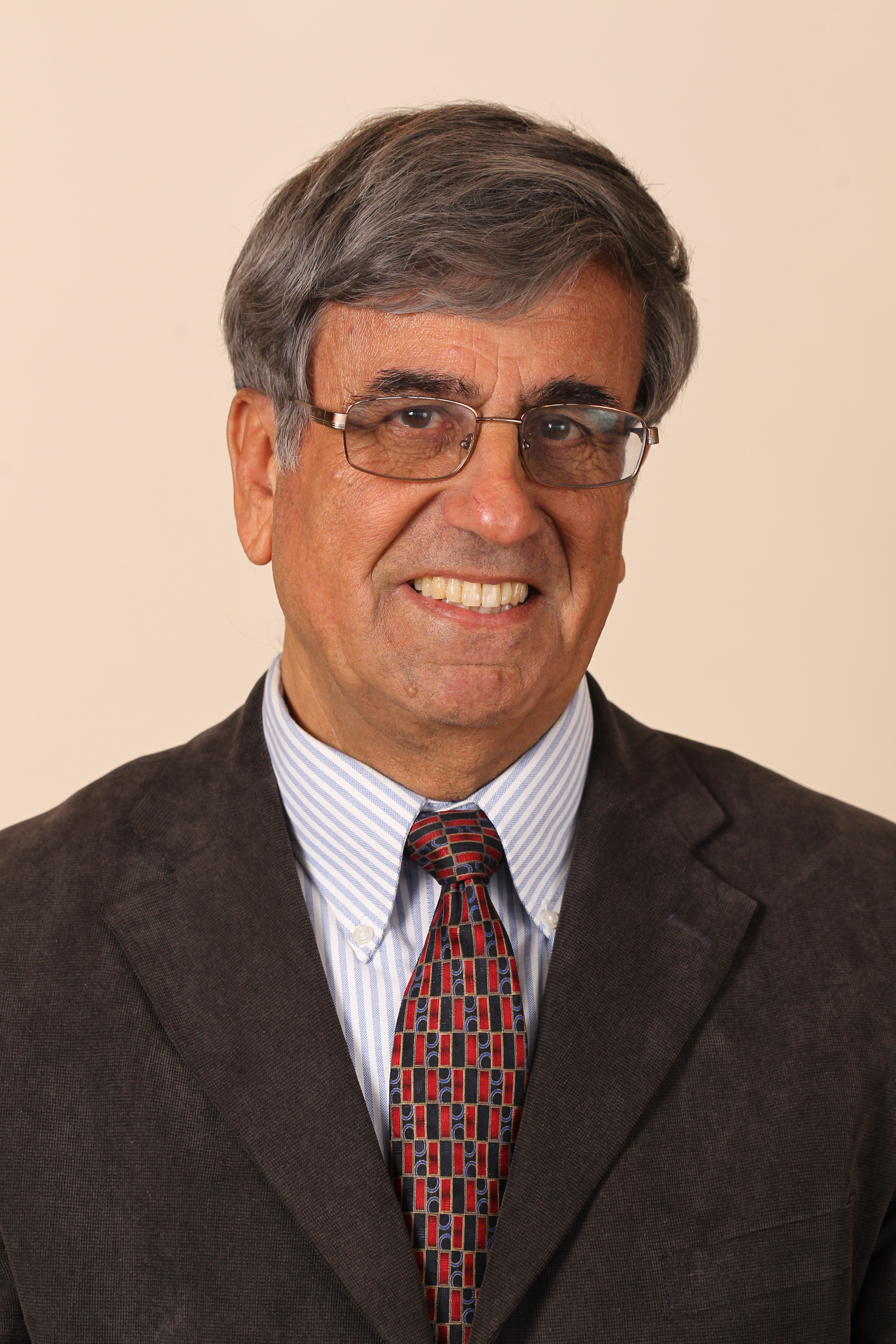

Faction represented in the Knesset
- 2013–2015: Yisrael Beiteinu

Personal details
- Born: 1 June 1945 (age 80); Marrakesh, Morocco

Shimon Ohayon (Hebrew: שמעון אוחיון; born 1 June 1945) is an Israeli politician and a professor at Bar-Ilan University. He served as a member of the Knesset for Yisrael Beiteinu between 2013 and 2015.

== Biography ==
Born in Morocco, Ohayon immigrated to Israel with his family in 1956. He studied at a high school in Beersheba before joining the IDF for his national service. He went on to study at Bar-Ilan University, where he became chairman of the Student Association. After university he worked for the Jewish Agency in the United States, where he was responsible for encouraging students to study at Israeli universities. In 1979 he returned to Israel and joined the Education faculty at Bar-Ilan University, eventually becoming its deputy director. He also served as chairman of the Moroccan Immigrants' Organisation.

In 2009, Ohayon was placed 20th on the Jewish Home list for the Knesset elections that year, but failed to enter the Knesset after the party won just three seats. He later joined Yisrael Beiteinu and was placed 31st on the joint list with Likud for the 2013 elections. He was elected to the Knesset as the alliance won 31 seats.

Ohayon was placed fourteenth on the Yisrael Beiteinu list for the 2015 elections, and lost his seat as the party was reduced to six seats.

== See also ==
- Day to Mark the Departure and Expulsion of Jews from the Arab Countries and Iran
