= Judeo-Egyptian Arabic =

Arabic dialect spoken by Egyptian Jews

- Native to: Egypt
- Ethnicity: Egyptian Jews
- Language family: Afro-Asiatic: Semitic; Central Semitic; Arabic; Egyptian Arabic; Judeo-Egyptian Arabic
- Writing system: Arabic alphabet Hebrew alphabet

Language codes
- ISO 639-3: None (mis)
- Glottolog: None
- ELP: Judeo-Egyptian Arabic

Judeo-Egyptian Arabic (also Egyptian Judeo-Arabic) is an Arabic dialect spoken by Egyptian Jews. It is a variety of Egyptian Arabic.

== Classification ==
Judeo-Egyptian Arabic is one of the Judeo-Arabic dialects. It is close to the dialect of Alexandria, and this similarity holds true even for those who speak it in Cairo. For example, in Cairene Arabic, "I write" is baktib (بكتب) and "I eat" is bakol. In Egyptian Judeo-Arabic, as in western Alexandrian Arabic it is nektobou (نكتبوا) and neshrabou, resembling a first person but in plural form.

== History ==
Until the mid 20th century, there were around 75,000 speakers of Judeo-Egyptian Arabic. Today, most Egyptian Jews live in Israel and speak Hebrew.

The first research on Judeo-Egyptian Arabic was done in 1968 by Nada Tomiche.

Current status

Judeo-Egyptian Arabic is currently in decline due to the exodus of the Jews from Egypt, with almost none remaining today. The language may soon become extinct.

== Vocabulary ==
Most of the unique words in Judeo-Egyptian Arabic come from Hebrew, though some come from French and Italian. It also contains several words made by mixing Hebrew and Egyptian Arabic, as well as several extra pronouns not found in Egyptian Arabic.

Like other Judeo-Arabic dialects, Judeo-Egyptian Arabic preserves several archaic traits lost in Egyptian Arabic.

== Sample Text ==
Judeo-Egyptian Arabic	English
ואל צביה חוסנת אל מנטר קווי ברכיה וראגל אלם ערפהא ונזלת אל עין ומלת גרתהא וטלעת	and the girl (was) very good looking, a virgin, and no man had known her. She went down to the spring, filled her jar, and came up
