= Academy of the Arabic Language in Israel =

Israeli linguistic institution

The Academy of the Arabic Language
- مجمع اللغة العربية

Agency overview
- Formed: 2007
- Headquarters: Haifa, Israel
- Agency executive: Mahmoud Ghanayem, President
- Website: www.arabicac.com

The Academy of the Arabic Language (Note: (Arabic: مجمع اللغة العربية, romanized: Mujamma‘ al-Luġa al-‘Arabiyya; Hebrew: האקדמיה ללשון הערבית, romanized: HaAkademia laLashon haAravit)) is an institute for the study and research of the Arabic language in Israel.

== History ==
The Academy of the Arabic Language, headquartered in Haifa, was established in December 2007. Among the founders is Sasson Somekh. Its activities are governed by a Knesset Law approved in March 2007 and are largely parallel those of the Hebrew Language Academy. The president of the academy is Mahmoud Ghanayem.

The academy works to promote:

- Study of the history of Arabic language
- Study of the Arabic language: structure, terminology, grammar, lexicon, pronunciation, spelling, reading, writing and orthography including innovations in the language and adaptations stemming from technological developments and advanced computing
- Editing dictionaries
- Study of Arab culture and literature
- Contact and cooperation with the Hebrew Language Academy and Hebrew and Arabic research institutes in Israel and abroad
- Cooperation with the Ministry of Education and higher education institutions and consultant services
- Publication of texts and organization of conferences

== See also ==
- Palestinian Arabic
- List of language regulators
