= Modern Palestinian Judeo-Arabic =

Variety of Arabic

- Native to: Israel, Palestine, Lebanon
- Region: North and Central Israel, Southern Lebanon
- Ethnicity: Moroccan Jews, Old Yishuv and Israeli-Jewish descendants
- Native speakers: ≤4 (Note: as of 2016)
- Language family: Afro-Asiatic: Semitic; West; Central; Arabic; Maghrebi and Levantine; Pre-Hilalian and South Levantine; Judeo-Moroccan and Palestinian; Modern Palestinian Judeo-Arabic
- Dialects: Galilee; Jerusalem

Language codes
- ISO 639-3: –

Modern Palestinian Judeo-Arabic (MPJA) is a variety of Palestinian and Moroccan Arabic that was spoken by the Old Yishuv in Ottoman and Mandatory Palestine, and currently by a few Israeli Jews in Israel.

It was once spoken by around 10,000 speakers in the 20th century. Today it is nearly extinct with only 5 speakers remaining in Galilee.

MPJA's decline is attributed to the revival of Hebrew and the proliferation of Modern Hebrew among the Yishuv.

== History ==
=== Origins ===
Following the Al-Hambra decree after the conclusion of the Reconquista in Iberia, Sephardi Jews began arriving in Ottoman Palestine in the 16th century, settling especially in the four holy cities of Jerusalem, Hebron, Safed, and Tiberias. Over time, MPJA formed out of a conglomerate of Maghrebi Jewish dialects and Palestinian Arabic dialects. In addition to the Jewish communities of Ottoman Palestine, many Jews of coastal Lebanese cities, with whom they maintained strong relations, adopted a variant of MPJA.

=== Modern History ===
Presumably, the number of MPJA speakers in the first third of the 20th century reached several thousand and possibly more than ten thousand at its peak. However, as Hebrew became the dominant language of the Yishuv, and later, the State of Israel, the speech community sharply declined. The number of MPJA (both Galilean and Jerusalem variants) speakers at the end of the 20th century was still greater than one hundred. However, as of 2016, there were only 5 speakers estimated to remain in the Galilee.

== Dialects ==
MPJA is divided into two subgroups based on where it was spoken: Galilean MPJA and Jerusalem MPJA. The Galilean had two subdialects in the cities of Safed and Tiberias.

== Lexicon ==
MPJA lexicon contains several influences from its Maghrebi origins as well as Hebrew, Ladino, and Aramaic loanwords for several specifically Jewish terms. Beginning in 1936 as Hebrew became ever more prevalent among the Old Yishuv, Hebrew loanwords became more prevalent and older Hebrew loanwords phonetically reverted to their original Hebrew pronunciation. By 1948 Hebrew loanwords had completely reverted and Hebrew loans became more prevalent.
