= Judeo-Arabic =

Jewish varieties of Arabic language

- ערבית יהודית
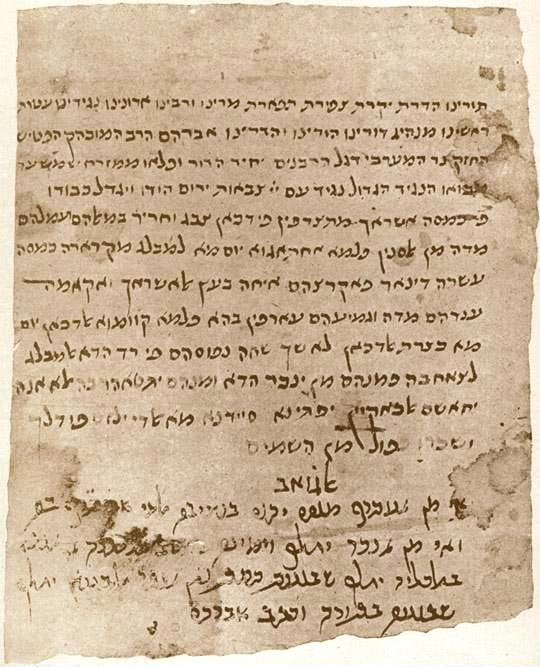
- A page from the Cairo Geniza, part of which is written in the Judeo-Arabic language
- Ethnicity: Jews from North Africa, the Fertile Crescent, and Yemen
- Native speakers: 240,000 (2022)
- Language family: Afro-Asiatic: Semitic; West Semitic; Central Semitic; Arabic; Judeo-Arabic
- Early forms: Old Arabic: Classical Arabic
- Writing system: Hebrew alphabet

Language codes
- ISO 639-2: jrb
- ISO 639-3: jrb – inclusive code Individual codes: yhd – Judeo-Iraqi Arabic aju – Judeo-Moroccan Arabic yud – Judeo-Tripolitanian Arabic jye – Judeo-Yemeni Arabic
- Glottolog: None

Judeo-Arabic (Judeo-Arabic: ערביה יהודיה, romanized: Arabiya Yahūdiya; Arabic: عربية يهودية, romanized: ʿArabiya Yahūdiya; Hebrew: ערבית יהודית, romanized: 'Aravít Yehudít), sometimes referred to as Sharh in its high-level translation calque, is a group of related ethnolects or religiolects within the branches of the Arabic language used by Jewish communities. Judeo-Arabic is a mixed form of Arabic, in its formal and vernacular varieties, as it has been used by Jews, and refers to both written forms and spoken dialects. Although Jewish dialectical forms of Arabic, which predate Islam, have been distinct from those of other religious communities, they are not a uniform linguistic entity.

Varieties of Arabic formerly spoken by Jews throughout the Arab world have been, in modern times, classified as distinct ethnolects. Under the ISO 639 international standard for language codes, Judeo-Arabic is classified as a macrolanguage under the code jrb, encompassing four languages: Judeo-Moroccan Arabic (aju), Judeo-Yemeni Arabic (jye), Judeo-Egyptian Arabic (yhd), and Judeo-Tripolitanian Arabic (yud).

Judeo-Arabic is a blend of Arabic, Arabic dialects, Hebrew, and Aramaic. Later forms of Judeo-Arabic particularly express Hebrew and Aramaic elements.

Many significant Jewish works, including a number of religious writings by Saadia Gaon, Maimonides and Judah Halevi, were originally written in Judeo-Arabic, as this was the primary vernacular language of their authors.

== History ==
Jewish use of Arabic in Arabia predates Islam. There is evidence of a Jewish Arabic dialect, similar to general Arabic but including some Hebrew and Aramaic lexemes, called al-Yahūdiyya, predating Islam. Some of these Hebrew and Aramaic words may have passed into general usage, particularly in religion and culture, though this pre-Islamic Judeo-Arabic was not the basis of a literature.

There were Jewish Pre-Islamic Arabic poets, such as al-Samawʾal ibn ʿĀdiyā, though surviving written records of such Jewish poets do not indicate anything that distinguishes their use of Arabic from non-Jewish use of it, and their work according to Geoffrey Khan is generally not referred to as Judeo-Arabic. This work is similar to and tends to follow Classical Arabic, and Benjamin Hary, who calls it Classical Judeo-Arabic, notes it still includes some dialectal features, such as in Saadia Gaon's translation of the Pentateuch. This period includes a wide array of literary works. Scholars assume that Jewish communities in Arabia spoke Arabic as their vernacular language, and some write that there is evidence of the presence of Hebrew and Aramaic words in their speech, as such words appear in the Quran and might have come from contact with these Arabic-speaking Jewish communities.

Before the spread of Islam, Jewish communities in Mesopotamia and Syria spoke Aramaic, while those to the West spoke Romance and Berber. With the Early Muslim conquests, areas including Mesopotamia and the eastern and southern Mediterranean underwent Arabization, most rapidly in urban centers. Some isolated Jewish communities continued to speak Aramaic until the 10th century, and some communities never adopted Arabic as a vernacular language at all. Although urban Jewish communities were using Arabic as their spoken language, Jews kept Hebrew and Aramaic, traditional rabbinic languages, as their languages of writing during the first three centuries of Muslim rule, perhaps due to the presence of the Sura and Pumbedita yeshivas in rural areas where people spoke Aramaic.

Jews in Arabic, Muslim majority countries wrote—sometimes in their dialects, sometimes in a more classical style—in a mildly adapted Hebrew alphabet rather than using the Arabic script, often including consonant dots from the Arabic alphabet to accommodate phonemes that did not exist in the Hebrew alphabet.

For centuries, Jews residing in Islamic lands used Judeo-Arabic for daily communication and written works, leading to significant literary output. This linguistic variety emerged with the Arab conquests in the seventh century, blending classical, postclassical, and dialectal Arabic features, as a variety within the cluster of Middle Arabic. It became prevalent among urban populations starting with the lower strata. While some scholars suggest its use reflected a desire to elevate non-Arab cultures, Shu'ubiyya, over pan-Arabization, Arabiyya, others view it as a pragmatic choice. Jewish communities, lacking the same theological necessity for Classical Arabic, adopted dialectal forms more readily, and exhibited diverse approaches to Arabic literary conventions.

By around 800 CE, most Jews within the Islamic Empire (90% of the world's Jews at the time) were native speakers of Arabic like the populations around them. This led to the development of early Judeo-Arabic. The language quickly became the central language of Jewish scholarship and communication, enabling Jews to participate in the greater epicenter of learning at the time, which meant that they could be active participants in secular scholarship and civilization. The widespread usage of Arabic not only unified the Jewish community located throughout the Islamic Empire but also facilitated greater communication with other ethnic and religious groups, which led to manuscripts like the Toledot Yeshu, being written or published in Arabic or Judeo-Arabic. By the 10th century Judeo-Arabic would transition from Early to Classical Judeo-Arabic.

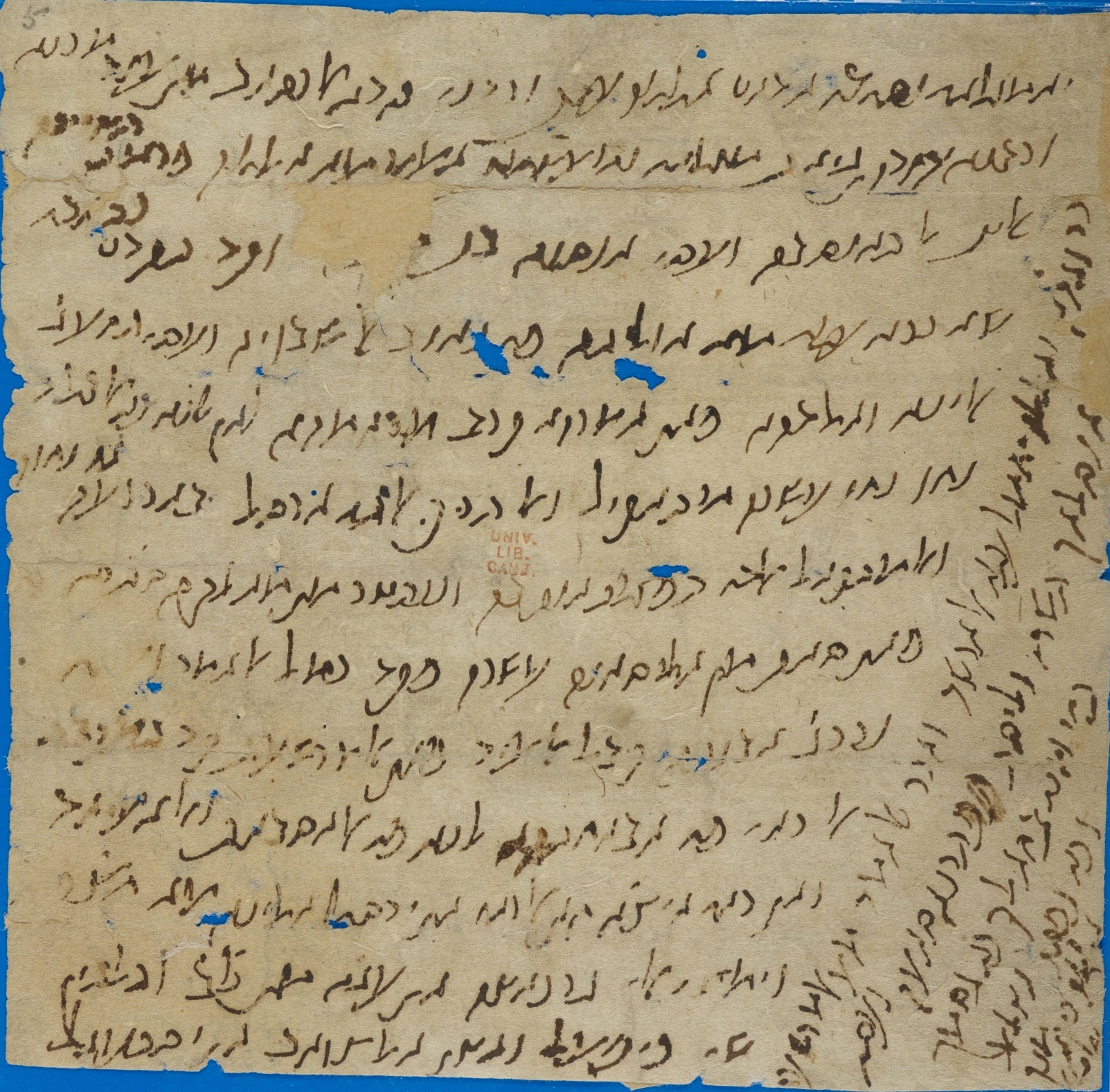
A letter in Andalusi Arabic handwritten by Judah ha-Levi (1075–1141) found in the Cairo Geniza. While Muslims did not write in vernacular registers of Arabic, Jews would sometimes write in vernacular registers of Arabic using Hebrew script.

In al-Andalus, Jewish poets associated with the golden age of Jewish culture in Spain, such as Judah Halevi, composed poetry with Arabic. The muwaššaḥ, an Andalusi genre of strophic poetry, typically included kharjas, or closing lines often in a different language. About half of the corpus of the more than 250 known muwaššaḥāt in Hebrew have kharjas in Arabic, compared to roughly 50 with Hebrew kharjas, and about 25 with Romance. There are also a few kharjas with a combination of Hebrew and Arabic.

During the 15th century, as Jews, especially in North Africa, gradually began to identify less with Arabs, Judeo-Arabic would undergo significant changes and become Later Judeo-Arabic. This coincided with increased isolation of Jewish communities and involved greater influence of Hebrew and Aramaic features.

Some of the most important books of medieval Jewish thought were originally written in medieval Judeo-Arabic, as were certain halakhic works and biblical commentaries. Later they were translated into medieval Hebrew so that they could be read by contemporaries elsewhere in the Jewish world, and by others who were literate in Hebrew. These include:

- Saadia Gaon's translations of the Pentateuch, Emunoth ve-Deoth (originally كتاب الأمانات والاعتقادات), his tafsir (biblical commentary and translation) and siddur (explanatory content, not the prayers themselves)
- David ibn Merwan al-Mukkamas
- Solomon ibn Gabirol's Tikkun Middot ha-Nefesh
- Bahya ibn Paquda's Kitab al-Hidāya ilā Fara'id al-Qulūb, translated by Judah ben Saul ibn Tibbon as Chovot HaLevavot
- Judah Halevi's Kuzari
- Maimonides' Commentary on the Mishnah, Sefer Hamitzvot, The Guide for the Perplexed, and many of his letters and shorter essays.
- and possibly Zechariah ha-Rofé's Midrash ha-Hefez

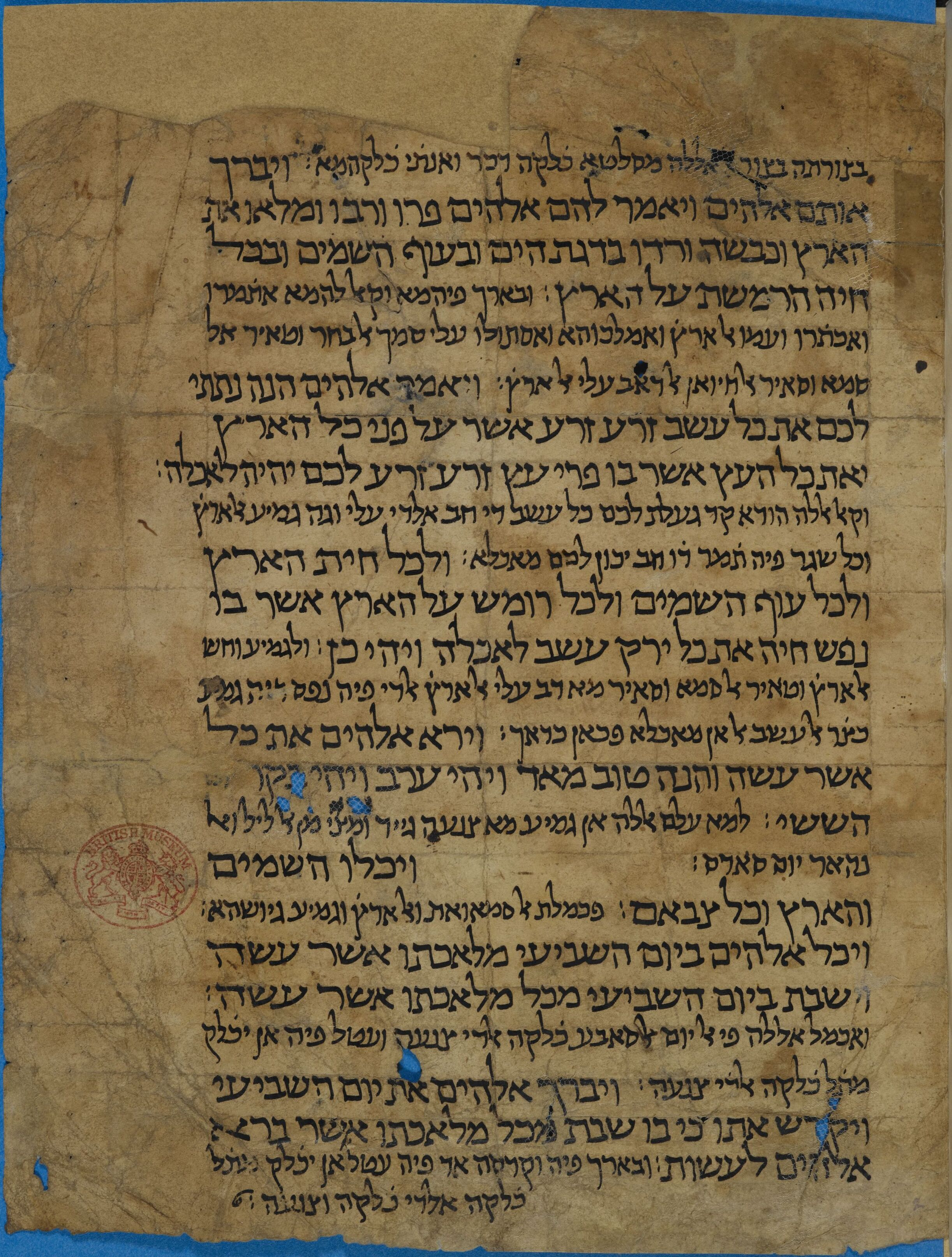
A manuscript of Saadiah Gaon's translation of the Pentateuch.

Sharch (šarḥ, pl. šurūḥ, šarḥanim) is a literary genre consisting of the translation of sacred texts, such as Bible translations into Arabic, the Talmud or siddurim, which were composed in Hebrew and Aramaic, into Judeo-Arabic, prevalent starting in the 15th century, and exhibiting a number of mixed elements. The term sharḥ sometimes came to mean "Judeo-Arabic" in the same way that "Targum" was sometimes used to mean the Aramaic language. The texts of the sharh are based on and dependent on Hebrew.

=== Present day ===
The significant emigration of Judeo-Arabic speakers in the 1940s and 1950s to Israel, France, and North America has led to endangerment or near-extinction of the ethnolects. Judeo-Arabic was viewed negatively in Israel as all Arabic was viewed as an "enemy language". Their distinct Arabic dialects in turn did not thrive, and most of their descendants now speak French or Modern Hebrew almost exclusively; thus resulting in the entire group of Judeo-Arabic dialects being considered endangered languages. There remain small populations of speakers in Morocco, Algeria, Tunisia, Lebanon, Yemen, the United States, and Israel.

== Historiography ==
The 19th century rediscovery of the Cairo Geniza gave the study of Judeo-Arabic prominence within Judaic Studies, leading to publications such as Shelomo Dov Goitein's series A Mediterranean Society: The Jewish Communities of the Arab World as Portrayed in the Documents of the Cairo Geniza.

Cultural critic Ella Shohat notes that modern Jewish speakers of Arabic did not refer to their language as 'Judeo-Arabic' but simply as 'Arabic'. In the period of 'massive dislocation' from the late 1940s through the 1960s, Jewish speakers of Arabic in diaspora and their descendants gradually adopted the term 'Judeo-Arabic' and its equivalents in French and Hebrew. Shohat's criticism is a recent intervention that challenges the conventional wisdom, though she stipulates that she excludes the medieval context from her discussion.

Shohat identifies linguist Yehoshua Blau as a key figure in the development of the notion of Judeo-Arabic, within what she describes as a Zionist linguistic project invested in prioritizing the uniqueness and separateness of isolatable 'Jewish languages'. Shohat cites the first issue of the Israeli journal Pe'amim, which featured a "Scholars' Forum" (בימת חוקרים) on "The Jewish Languages – the Common, the Unique and the Problematic" (הלשונות היהודיות – המשותף, המיוחד והבעייתי) with articles from Chaim Menachem Rabin "מה מייחד את הלשונות היהודיות" ('What Distinguishes the Jewish Languages') and Yehoshua Blau "הערבית-היהודית הקלאסית" ('Classical Judeo-Arabic'). This project explicitly sought to describe the Arabic of Jews as a distinct, Jewish language, equating it with Yiddish. According to Esther-Miriam Wagner, the case of Judeo-Arabic reified a Zionist 'Arab vs. Jew' dichotomy.

== Characteristics ==
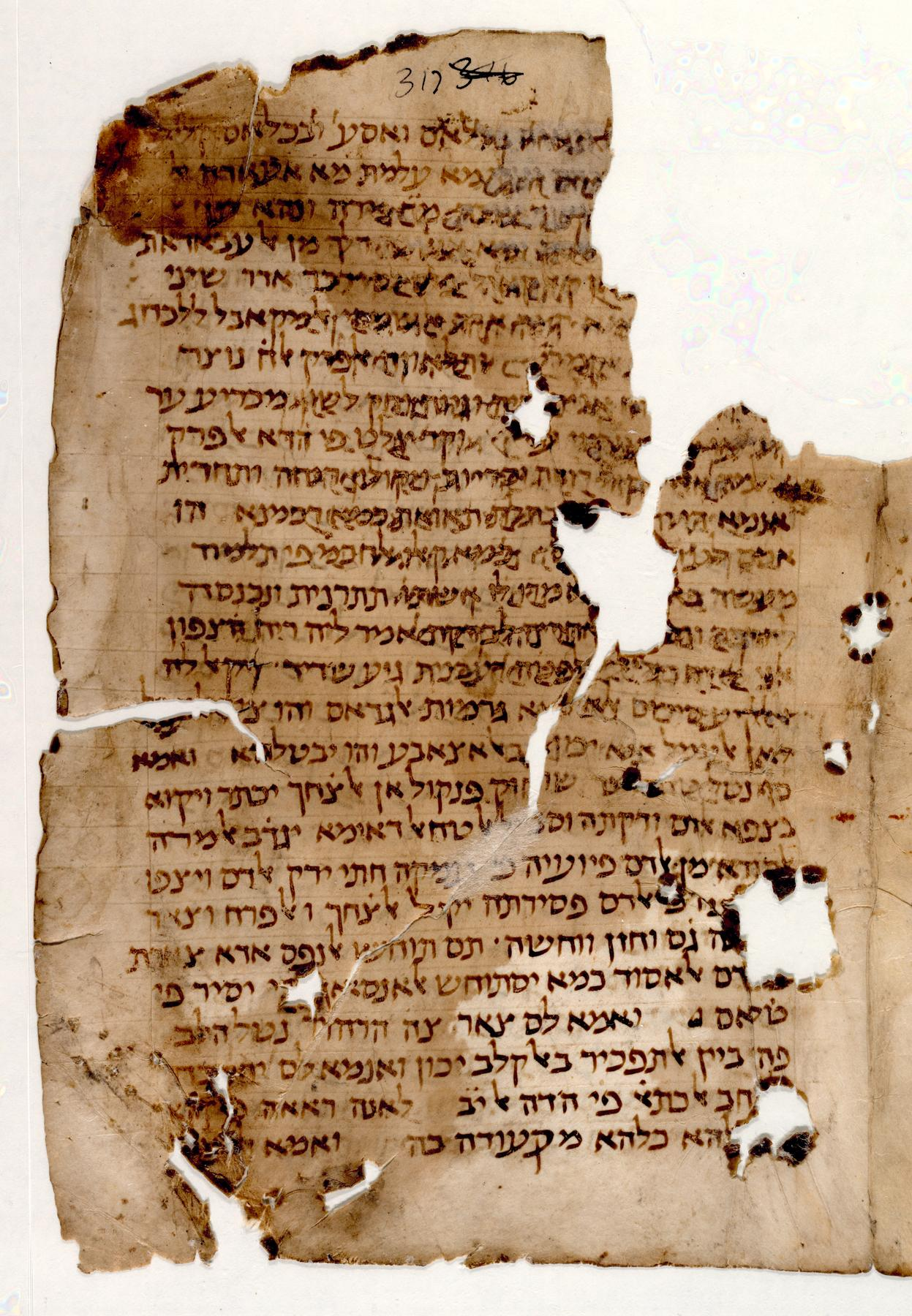
A folio from a philological essay on definitions of Hebrew words found in the Cairo Geniza, 10th-12th c.

Judeo-Arabic can be seen as many different mixed forms incorporating different aspects of Classical Arabic, Arabic dialects, Hebrew and Aramaic. Judeo-Arabic, particularly in its later forms, contains distinctive features and elements of Hebrew and Aramaic.

The Arabic spoken by Jewish communities in the Arab world differed from the Arabic of their non-Jewish neighbors. Particularly in its later forms, Judeo-Arabic contains distinctive features and elements of Hebrew and Aramaic, such as grammar, vocabulary, orthography, and style.

For example, most Jews in Egypt lived in Cairo and Alexandria and they shared a common dialect. Baghdad Jewish Arabic is reminiscent of the dialect of Mosul. For example, "I said" is qeltu in the speech of Baghdadi Jews and Christians, as well as in Mosul and Syria, as against Muslim Baghdadi gilit.

Judeo-Arabic can be thought of as a variety of vernacular Middle Arabic, and differs from Bedouin dialects and classical Arabic in a shift to subject-verb-object word order and in that it is more an analytical language versus a synthetic language, relying on syntax more than morphology. It also exhibits changes such as the loss of nominal case and verbal modal endings and the introduction of new object markers and particles.

Some Judeo-Arabic writers, such as Maimonides, were able to switch between varieties of Judeo-Arabic and the Standard Arabic dialect.

Like other Jewish languages and dialects, Judeo-Arabic languages contain borrowings from Hebrew and Aramaic. This feature is less marked in translations of the Bible, as the authors clearly took the view that the business of a translator is to translate.

== Dialects ==
- Judeo-Algerian
- Judeo-Egyptian
- Judeo-Moroccan (~66,000 native speakers)
- Judeo-Tripolitanian (~43,000)
- Judeo-Tunisian
- Judeo-Yemeni (~38,000)
- Judeo-Syrian
- Judeo-Lebanese
- Modern Palestinian Judeo-Arabic (~4)
- Judeo-Iraqi (~97,000)
  - Judeo-Baghdadi

== Media ==
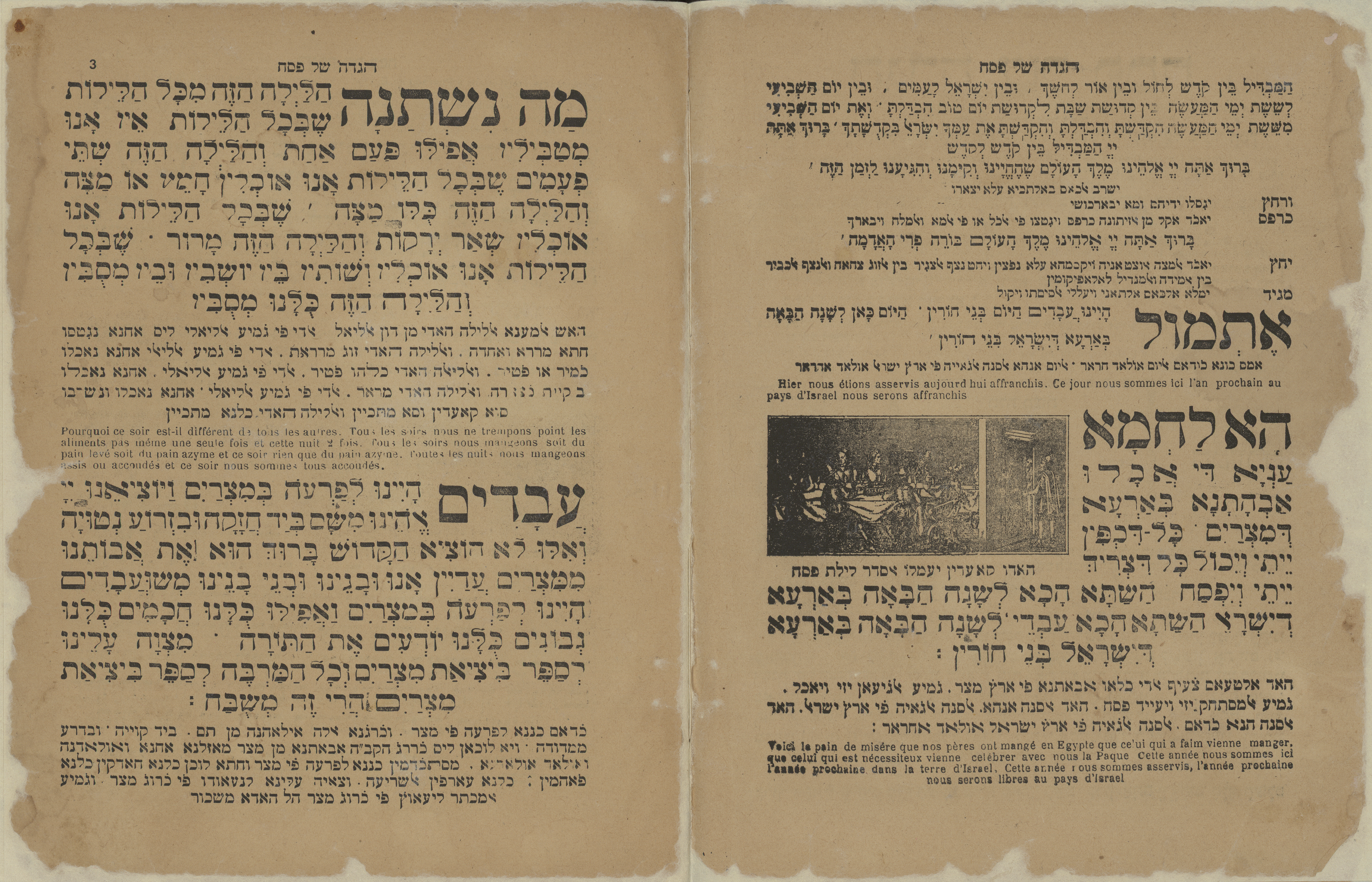
A printed haggadah with translations in French and Judeo-Arabic, Tunis, 1920.

Most literature in Judeo-Arabic is of a Jewish nature and is intended for readership by Jewish audiences. There was also widespread translation of Jewish texts from languages like Yiddish and Ladino into Judeo-Arabic, and translation of liturgical texts from Aramaic and Hebrew into Judeo-Arabic. There is also Judeo-Arabic videos on YouTube.

A collection of over 400,000 of Judeo-Arabic documents from the 6th-19th centuries was found in the Cairo Geniza.

The movie Farewell Baghdad would be released in 2013 entirely in Judeo-Iraqi Arabic

== Orthography ==
Judeo-Arabic orthography uses a modified version of the Hebrew alphabet called the Judeo-Arabic script. It is written from right to left horizontally like the Hebrew script and also like the Hebrew script some letters contain final versions, used only when that letter is at the end of a word. It also uses the letters alef and waw or yodh to mark long or short vowels respectively. The order of the letters varies between alphabets.

Judeo- Arabic	Arabic	Semitic name	Transliteration
א	ا	Alef	/ʔ/ ā and sometimes ʾI
ב	ب	Beth	b
ג	ج	Gimel	g or ǧ: hard G, or J, as in get, or Jack: /ɡ/, or /dʒ/ or si in vision /ʒ/ depending on the dialect
גׄ, עׄ or רׄ	غ	Ghayn	ġ /ɣ/, a guttural gh sound
ד	د	Daleth	d
דׄ	ذ	Dhaleth	ḏ, an English th as in "that" /ð/
ה	ه	He	h
ו or וו	و	Waw	w and sometimes ū
ז	ز	Zayn	z
ח	ح	Heth	ḥ /ħ/
ט	ط	Teth	ṭ /tˤ/
טׄ or זׄ	ظ	Theth	ẓ /ðˤ/, a retracted form of the th sound as in "that"
י or יי	ي	Yodh	y or ī
כ, ך	ك	Kaph	k
כׄ, ךׄ or חׄ	خ	Kheth	ḫ, a kh sound like "Bach" /x/
ל	ل	Lamedh	l
מ	م	Mem	m
נ	ن	Nun	n
ס	س	Samekh	s
ע	ع	Ayn	/ʕ/ ʿa, ʿ and sometimes ʿi
פ, ף or פׄ, ףׄ	ف	Fe	f
צ, ץ	ص	Sadhe	ṣ /sˤ/, a hard s sound
צׄ, ץׄ	ض	Dhadhe	ḍ /dˤ/, a retracted d sound
ק	ق	Qof	q
ר	ر	Resh	r
ש or ש֒	ش	Shin	š, an English sh sound /ʃ/
ת	ت	Taw	t
תׄ or ת֒	ث	Thaw	ṯ, an English th as in "thank" /θ/
Additional letters
ﭏ	الـ	-	Definite Article "al-". Ligature of the letters א and ל

== Sample text ==
Hebrew (Masoretic Text)	Arabic script	Transliteration	English
בְּרֵאשִׁית בָּרָא אֱלֹהִים אֵת הַשָּׁמַיִם וְאֵת הָאָרֶץ	أَوَّلُ مَا خَلَقَ اللَّهُ، السَّمَوَاتِ وَالْأَرْضَ	ʾAwwal mā khalaqa Allāh al-samāwāt wa-l-arḍ.	The first thing God created was the heavens and the earth.

== See also ==
- Arabic language in Israel
- Judeo-Berber language
- Judeo-Iraqi Arabic
- Baghdad Jewish Arabic
- Judeo-Moroccan Arabic
- Judeo-Tunisian Arabic
- Judeo-Yemeni Arabic
- Judeo-Syrian Arabic
- Judeo-Algerian Arabic
- Letter of the Karaite elders of Ascalon
- Arab Jews
- Haketia
- Garshuni

== Bibliography ==
- Blanc, Haim, Communal Dialects in Baghdad: Harvard 1964
- Blau, Joshua, The Emergence and Linguistic Background of Judaeo-Arabic: OUP, last edition 1999
- Blau, Joshua, A Grammar of Mediaeval Judaeo-Arabic: Jerusalem 1980 (in Hebrew)
- Blau, Joshua, Studies in Middle Arabic and its Judaeo-Arabic variety: Jerusalem 1988 (in English)
- Blau, Joshua, Dictionary of Mediaeval Judaeo-Arabic Texts: Jerusalem 2006
- Mansour, Jacob, The Jewish Baghdadi Dialect: Studies and Texts in the Judaeo-Arabic Dialect of Baghdad: Or Yehuda 1991
- Heath, Jeffrey, Jewish and Muslim dialects of Moroccan Arabic (Routledge Curzon Arabic linguistics series): London, New York, 2002.
