= Targum (Aramaic dialects) =

Targum is used by the Jews of northern Iraq and Kurdistan to refer to a variety of Aramaic dialects spoken by them till recent times. For details of these dialects, see Judeo-Aramaic language. The word "targum" simply means "translation" in Hebrew, and the primary reference of the term is the Aramaic Bible translations of that name. The Jewish use of "Targum" to mean the Aramaic language in general dates back to the early Middle Ages. An analogy is the use of "Ladino" to mean Judeo-Spanish, and of sharħ to mean Judeo-Arabic.

== See also ==
- Assyrian Neo-Aramaic
- Aramaic language
- Northeastern Neo-Aramaic
