= Presidential Young Investigator Award =

US science award

The Presidential Young Investigator Award (PYI) was awarded by the National Science Foundation of the United States Federal Government. The program operated from 1984 to 1991, and was replaced by the NSF Young Investigator (NYI) Awards and Presidential Faculty Fellows (PFF) program. In 1995, the NSF Young Investigator program was subsumed into the NSF CAREER Awards program, and in 1996, the Presidential Faculty Fellows program was replaced by the PECASE program.

Applicants could not directly apply for the award, but were nominated by others including their own institutions based on their previous record of scientific achievement. The award, a certificate from the White House signed by the President of the United States, included a minimum grant of $25,000 a year for five years from NSF to be used for any scientific research project the awardee wished to pursue, with the possibility of additional funding up to $100,000 annually if the PYI obtained matching funds from industry. Considered to be one of the highest honors granted by the National Science Foundation, the award program was criticized in 1990 as not being the best use of NSF funds in an era of tight budgets.

Frances Arnold, winner of this award in 1989, won the Nobel Prize in Chemistry in 2018.

== Recipients ==
PYI award recipients include:

- Ahsan Kareem, Structural Engineering, 1984
- Narendra Ahuja, computer science, 1984
- Alice Agogino, engineering, 1985
- Judith Curry, meteorological science, 1988
- Paul Alivisatos, chemistry, 1991
- Peter B. Armentrout, chemistry, 1984
- David P. Anderson, computer science
- Frances Arnold, 1989
- Kenneth Balkus, chemistry, 1991
- Prithviraj Banerjee, computer systems architecture, 1987
- Paul F. Barbara, chemistry, 1984
- Christoph Beckermann, mechanical engineering, 1989
- Mary Beckman, linguistics, 1988
- Mladen Bestvina, mathematics, 1988
- Sanjay Banerjee, electrical engineering, 1988
- Robert Bryant, mathematics, 1984
- Stephen Z. D. Cheng, polymer science, 1991
- Paul Alan Cox, evolutionary ecology and ethnobotany, 1985
- Judith Curry, climate science, 1988
- Supriyo Datta, electrical engineering, 1984
- Rina Dechter, computer science, 1991
- Chris Q. Doe, biology, 1990
- Bruce Donald, computational biology, 1989
- David L. Donoho, statistics, 1985
- Lin Fanghua, mathematics, 1989
- Juli Feigon, biochemistry, 1989
- Eric Fossum, electrical engineering, 1986
- Jennifer Freyd, psychology
- Elaine Fuchs, cell biology, 1984
- Gerald Fuller, chemical engineering
- Huajian Gao, materials science
- Mark S. Ghiorso, geological sciences, 1985
- Leslie Greengard, advanced comp research program and computational mathematics, 1990
- Rajiv Gupta, parallelizing compilers, 1991.
- Bruce Hajek, 1984
- John L. Hennessy, computer science, 1984
- Jacqueline Hewitt, physics, 1991
- David Hillis, evolutionary biology, 1987
- John M. Hollerbach, haptics and tactile perception, 1984
- Kathleen Howell, astronomy, 1984
- Ellen Hildreth, computer vision, 1987
- Paul Hudak, computer science, 1985
- Nan Marie Jokerst, electrical engineering, 1990
- Moshe Kam, electrical engineering, 1990
- David B. Kaplan, physics, 1990
- Mehran Kardar, physics, 1989
- Karen Kavanagh, physics, 1991
- Susan Kidwell, geology, 1986
- Sangtae Kim, chemical engineering, 1985
- Vijay Kumar (roboticist), 1991
- Jacqueline Krim, materials research, 1986
- James W. LaBelle, physics, 1990
- Robert L. Last, plant biology, 1990
- Edward A. Lee, electrical engineering, 1997
- Kevin K. Lehmann, chemistry, 1985
- Charles E. Leiserson, computer science, 1985
- Marc Levoy, 1991
- Nathan Lewis, analytical and surface chemistry, 1988
- Kenneth Libbrecht, solar astrophysics, 1987
- John H. Lienhard V, mechanical engineering, 1988
- Udi Manber, computer science, 1985
- Eric Mazur, physics
- Mark McMenamin, geology, 1988
- Eckart Meiburg, mechanical engineering, 1990
- Fulvio Melia, astrophysics, 1988
- Carolyn Meyers, chemical engineering
- Michael I. Miller, biomedical engineering
- Robert F. Murphy (computational biologist), 1983
- Monica Olvera de la Cruz, materials physics, 1989
- Jon Orloff, physics, 1984
- Randy Pausch, computer science
- Gregory A. Voth, chemistry, 1991
- Joseph R. Pawlik, biological oceanography, 1991
- Ken Perlin, computer graphics, 1991
- Ronald T. Raines, chemical biology, 1990
- Mark O. Robbins, materials research, 1985
- Ares J. Rosakis, 1985
- Karl Rubin, mathematics
- Rob A. Rutenbar, computer engineering, 1987
- Sunil Saigal, civil engineering, 1990
- Peter Salovey, psychology, 1990
- Aziz Sancar, molecular biophysics, 1984
- Robert Sapolsky, neuroendocrinology
- Terrence Sejnowski, neuroscience, 1984
- Michael Steer, electrical engineering, 1986
- Joann Stock, earth science, 1990
- Howard A. Stone, chemical, bioengineering, environmental, and transport systems, 1989
- Steven Strogatz, mathematics, 1990
- Éva Tardos, algorithm analysis
- Patricia Thiel, chemistry, 1985
- Masaru Tomita, computational biology, 1988
- Kerry Vahala, materials research, 1988
- Mary K. Vernon, computer science, 1985
- Jeffrey Vitter, computer science, 1985
- Margaret Werner-Washburne, molecular biology, 1990
- Ellen D. Williams (scientist), materials research, 1984
- Martin Yarmush, biochemical engineering, 1988
- Todd Yeates, biochemistry, 1991
- Alex Zettl, physics, 1984
- Steven Zimmerman, chemistry
- Munther A. Dahleh, 1991
- Mamidala Ramulu, mechanical engineering, 1991
- Jose A. Ventura, industrial engineering, 1990
- Avideh Zakhor, electrical engineering, 1990

== NSF Young Investigator Program ==
In 1991, the NSF renamed the Presidential Young Investigator Program as the NSF Young Investigator Program, to reflect more accurately the level of prestige of the award—the term "Presidential" should be reserved for awards more prestigious.

== NSF Young Investigator recipients ==
- Jonathan Block, mathematics, 1993
- Rogers Brubaker, sociology, 1994
- Alyssa A. Goodman, astronomy, 1994
- Christopher R. Johnson, computer graphics and visualization, 1994
- John Edwin Luecke, mathematics, 1992
- Lisa Randall, theoretical physicist, 1992
- Eric Sven Ristad, artificial intelligence, 1992
- Cynthia F. Moss, 1992

== NSF Presidential Faculty Fellowship ==
The NSF Presidential Faculty Fellowship (PFF) program was launched by President George H.W. Bush to honor 30 young engineering and science professors. The awards were up to $100,000 per year for 5 years.

== PFF recipients ==
Here are some recipients of the Presidential Faculty Fellowship.

- David Culler, Computer Science, 1992
- Lance Fortnow, Computer Science, 1992
- Theodore (Ted) Rappaport, Wireless Communications, 1992
- Rebecca Richards-Kortum, Electrical/Bioengineering, 1992
- Louise H. Kellogg, Geophysics, 1992
- Jerry L. Prince, Biology, 1993
- Thomas E. Anderson, Computer Science, 1994
- Gregory Chirikjian, Mechanical Engineering, 1994
- Andrew Granville, Mathematics, 1994
- Leslie Kaelbling, Computer Science, 1994
- Jennifer A. Lewis, Materials Science, 1994
- Alan Willner, Electrical Engineering, 1994
- Ken Goldberg, Computer Sciences/Robotics, 1995
- Christopher R. Johnson, Computer Sciences, 1995

== See also ==
- PECASE
