= Torus-based cryptography =

Torus-based cryptography involves using algebraic tori to construct a group for use in ciphers based on the discrete logarithm problem. This idea was first introduced by Alice Silverberg and Karl Rubin in 2003 in the form of a public key algorithm by the name of CEILIDH. It improves on conventional cryptosystems by representing some elements of large finite fields compactly and therefore transmitting fewer bits.

== See also ==
- Torus
