= Alice Silverberg =

American mathematician

- Born: c. 1958 (age 67–68)
- Education: Harvard University; Princeton
- Awards: Sloan Fellowship (1990); Fellow, American Mathematical Society (2012); Fellow, Association for Women in Mathematics (2019)
- Scientific career
- Fields: Mathematics
- Workplaces: University of California, Irvine
- Thesis: Mordell-Weil groups of generic polarized abelian varieties (1984)
- Doctoral advisor: Goro Shimura
- Website: www.math.uci.edu/~asilverb/

Alice Silverberg (born 1958) is professor of Mathematics and Computer Science at the University of California, Irvine. She was faculty at the Ohio State University from 1984 through 2004. She has given over 300 lectures at universities around the world, and she has brought attention to issues of sexism and discrimination through her blog Alice's Adventures in Numberland.

== Research ==
Silverberg's research concerns number theory and cryptography. With Karl Rubin, she introduced the CEILIDH system for torus-based cryptography in 2003, and she currently holds 10 patents related to cryptography. She is also known for her work on theoretical aspects of abelian varieties.

== Education and career ==
Silverberg graduated from Harvard University in 1979, and received her Ph.D. from Princeton University in 1984 under the supervision of Goro Shimura. She began her academic career at Ohio State University in 1984 and became a full professor in 1996. She moved to the University of California, Irvine in 2004 as Professor of Mathematics and Computer Science, and in 2018 she was awarded the title of Distinguished Professor. Over the past 25 years she has organized or co-organized more than ten conferences in mathematics and cryptography, and has served on the program committees of more than twenty others. Silverberg has a long record of service with the American Mathematical Society and is currently a member of their nominating committee. She has served as an editor for the Association for Women in Mathematics since 2008, and recently joined the board of the Number Theory Foundation.

== Honors ==
In 2012, Silverberg became a fellow of the American Mathematical Society. She was elected to the 2019 class of fellows of the Association for Women in Mathematics "For her outstanding research in number theory and deep commitment to the promotion of fairness and equal opportunity evidenced by her service and outreach efforts", also citing her many invited lectures and her blog.

== Additional work ==
In 2017, Silverberg began a blog entitled Alice's Adventures in Numberland, which humorously discusses issues surrounding sexism in academia. This is a topic which she has previously discussed in interviews, and has been quoted on.
