= Eckart Meiburg =

American mechanical engineer

Eckart Heinz Meiburg
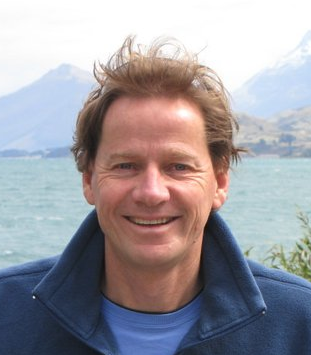
- Born: February 14, 1959
- Education: University of Karlsruhe
- Awards: Presidential Young Investigator Award (1990), APS Fellow (2005), Alexander von Humboldt Foundation Senior Research Award (2005), American Society of Mechanical Engineers fellow (2013)
- Scientific career
- Fields: Mechanical engineering, Computational engineering
- Workplaces: University of California, Santa Barbara
- Thesis: Numerical Simulation of the Formation of Two- and Three-Dimensional Structures in Shear Layers and Wakes (1985)

Eckart Heinz Meiburg (born 1959) is a German-American professor of mechanical engineering at the University of California, Santa Barbara. His research focuses on using computational fluid dynamics to study phenomena including sediment transport in gravity and turbidity currents, double diffusive instabilities, and particle-laden flows.

== Education ==
Meiburg did his undergraduate studies University of Karlsruhe, earning a Diplom-Ing. of Mechanical Engineering in 1981. Following one year under a DAAD fellowship at Stanford, he did his PhD studies at Karlsruhe as well in 1985.

== Career ==
Following a one-year postdoc at Stanford University in chemical engineering, Meiburg went to Brown University in 1987 as an assistant professor of applied mathematics. In 1990 he went to the University of Southern California as professor of aerospace engineering. In 2000 he moved to University of California Santa Barbara as a professor of mechanical engineering, where he currently works. He was the chair of the mechanical engineering department from 2003 to 2007, and is currently a distinguished professor.

He has been an associate editor of Physical Review Fluids since 2014. He has been an associate editor of European Journal of Mechanics B/Fluids and served on the editorial board of Journal of Turbulence.

His awards have included a Senior Gledden Fellowship (2005) from the Institute of Advanced Studies at the University of Western Australia, the Humboldt Prize (2005) Senior Research Award, the Presidential Young Investigator Award (1990), a first prize at the Scottish Offshore Achievement Awards, and the APS Gallery of Fluid Motion Flow Visualization Award (2001, 2004). He is a fellow of the American Physical Society (2005) and of the American Society of Mechanical Engineers (2013).
