= Ugo Piomelli =

Canadian engineer

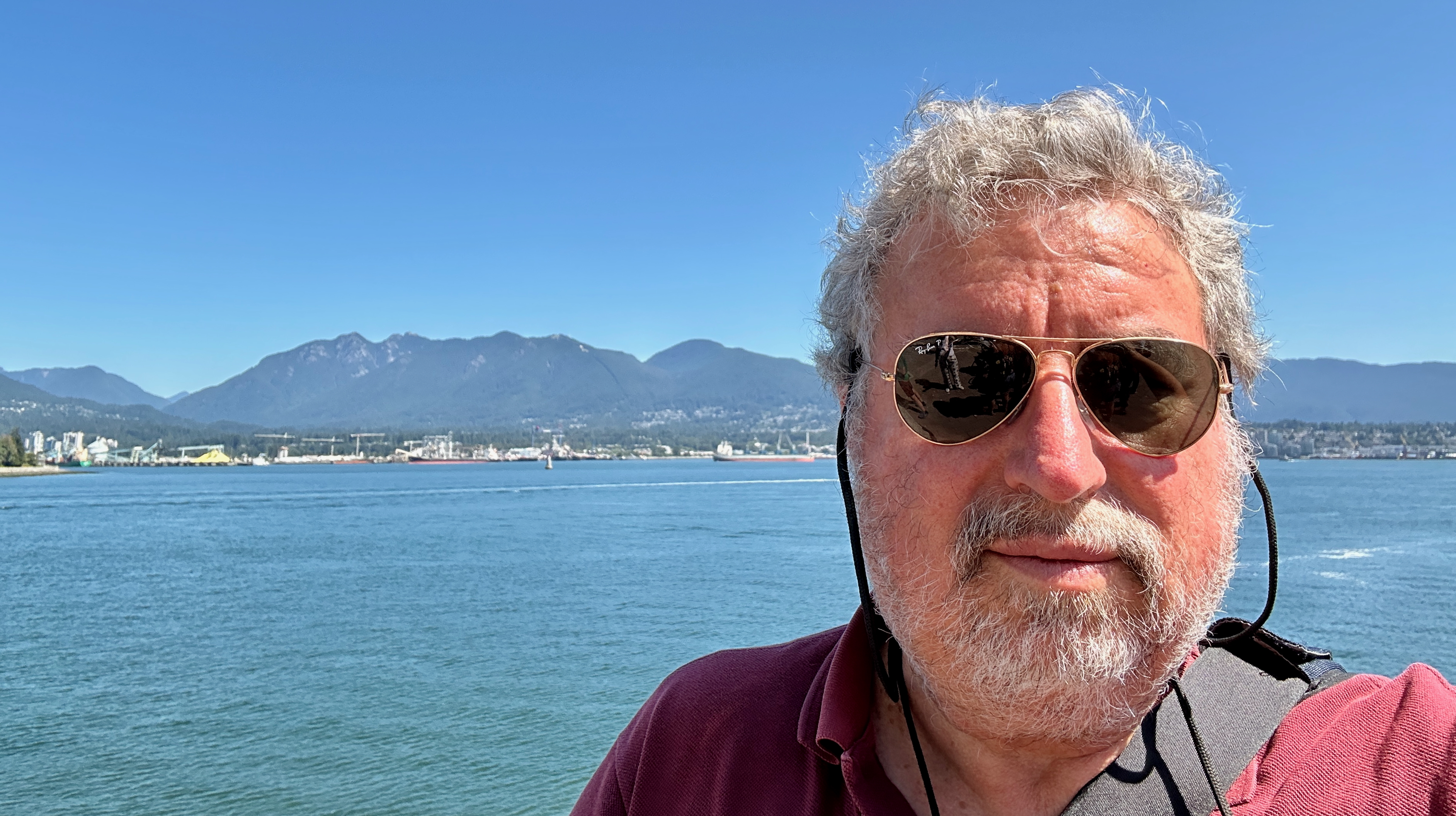
- Born: Naples, Italy
- Education: University of Naples Federico II; University of Notre Dame; Stanford University
- Known for: Turbulence modeling, large-eddy simulation
- Awards: Fellow, Royal Society of Canada Fellow, Canadian Academy of Engineering; Fellow, American Physical Society; Fellow, American Society of Mechanical Engineers Associate Fellow, American Institute of Aeronautics and Astronautics
- Scientific career
- Fields: Fluid dynamics, Turbulence
- Workplaces: Queen's University at Kingston
- Doctoral advisors: Parviz Moin, Joel Ferziger
- Website: Personal website

Ugo Piomelli is a mechanical engineer known for his contributions to the field of computational fluid dynamics, particularly in turbulence modeling and large-eddy simulation. He is currently a professor at Queen's University at Kingston.

== Career and research ==
Piomelli was born in Naples, Italy. He earned a Laurea in Ingegneria Aeronautica from the University of Naples Federico II in 1979. He completed his Master's degree at the University of Notre Dame in 1983, focusing on the numerical analysis of solid blocking effects for two-dimensional flow past an airfoil in a wind tunnel.

He then pursued a Ph.D. under the supervision of Parviz Moin and Joel Ferziger at Stanford University, with much of his early research conducted at NASA Ames Research Center. His doctoral work focused on subgrid-scale models for large-eddy simulations.

In 1987, Piomelli began his academic career as a faculty member in the Department of Mechanical Engineering at the University of Maryland, College Park. He spent 21 years at the University of Maryland, where he progressed through academic ranks and served as Associate Chair and Director of Graduate Studies from 2002 to 2007.

In 2008, he joined the Department of Mechanical and Materials Engineering at Queen's University in Kingston, Ontario as the Tier 1 Canada Research Chair in Turbulence Simulation and Modelling.

Pimelli is the editor-of-chief of the journal, Journal of Turbulence.

== Impact ==
Piomelli's research has focused on computational fluid dynamics, with an emphasis on large-eddy simulation (LES) of turbulent flows.

In 1991, he co-authored a paper describing the dynamic subgrid-scale eddy viscosity model for LES. This model improves upon the classical Smagorinsky model by allowing the subgrid-scale viscosity to adapt dynamically to the local flow conditions. The original paper has been cited over 10,000 times.

Piomelli has also published work on the use of LES in rough-wall boundary-layer flows, flows with separation and reattachment, and vortex-dominated flows. These methods have been applied in fields such as aerospace design, wind energy, and geophysical fluid modeling.

== Awards and honors ==
Piomelli was elected:

- Fellow of the American Physical Society (2002)
- Associate Fellow of the American Institute of Aeronautics and Astronautics (2004)
- Fellow of the American Society of Mechanical Engineers (2009)
- Fellow of the Royal Society of Canada (2015)
- Fellow of the Canadian Academy of Engineering (2021)

He held a Tier 1 Canada Research Chair in Turbulence Simulation and Modelling from 2008 to 2022.
