= James LaBelle =

James LaBelle is the name of:

- James D. La Belle (1925–1945), United States Marine who received a posthumous Medal of Honor for his service during World War II
- James W. LaBelle, American physicist, and professor at Dartmouth College
