= Ferziger =

Ferziger is a German language habitational surname. Notable people with the name include:

- Adam Ferziger (born 1964), American male writer
- Joel H. Ferziger (1937–2004), Computational fluid dynamicist
