= Christoph Beckermann =

German mechanical engineer

Christoph Beckermann (July 24, 1960 – April 9, 2025) was a University of Iowa Foundation Distinguished Professor of Mechanical Engineering at the University of Iowa. He also directed the Solidification Laboratory in the Department of Mechanical Engineering there.

== Education ==
Beckermann, who grew up in Osnabrück, Germany, studied Mechanical Engineering at the University of Hannover from 1979-1982. He entered the graduate program in Mechanical Engineering at Purdue University in 1982. There, he earned his M.S. in 1984 while working with Victor Goldschmidt and completed his Ph.D. in 1987, under the supervision of Raymond Viskanta.

== Career and research ==
Beckermann joined the Department of Mechanical Engineering at the University of Iowa as an assistant professor in 1987. He achieved full professorship in 1996 and was designated a University of Iowa Foundation Distinguished Professor of Mechanical Engineering in 2000.

His work in the fields of heat transfer and solidification is widely cited. His most frequently cited articles involve the development of volume-averaged multiphase/multiscale and phase-field models of alloy solidification and casting. In 2010, he received the Bruce Chalmers Award from The Minerals, Metals & Materials Society (TMS) which recognizes leaders who make outstanding contributions to the field of solidification. The American Society of Mechanical Engineers (ASME) honored him with the Heat Transfer Memorial Award in 2017 for outstanding contributions to the field of heat transfer. Other awards he received include a National Science Foundation Presidential Young Investigator Award in 1989, the Sir Humphrey Davy Scientific Merit Award from the American Foundry Society (AFS) in 2009, the Thomas E. Barlow Award of Honor from the Steel Founders’ Society of America (SFSA) in 2009, and an Outstanding Mechanical Engineer Award from Purdue University in 2017.

He served on the editorial board for the Journal of Heat Transfer and several other journals. His work led to being named a Fellow of the ASME, and he held an honorary life membership at TMS.
