= Kent Ford (astronomer) =

American astronomer (1931–2023)

William Ford Jr.
- Born: 8 April 1931; Clifton Forge, Virginia, United States
- Died: 18 June 2023 (aged 92)
- Education: University of Virginia (PhD)
- Children: 2 sons and 1 daughter

William Kent Ford Jr. (April 8, 1931 – June 18, 2023) was an American astronomer involved with the discovery of dark matter. He worked with scientist Vera Rubin, who used his advanced spectrometer in her studies of space and matter. Using this spectrometer to analyze the Doppler shifts of galaxies as a function of distance from their centers, the pair was able to demonstrate that dark matter existed and was widespread. Ford received the 1985 James Craig Watson Medal for his work on image enhancement and galactic dynamics. Ford died on June 18, 2023, at the age of 92.

== Work ==
=== Imaging tube development ===
Starting in 1955, when he was hired at the Carnegie Institution's Department of Terrestrial Magnetism, Ford worked on improving the electrostatic photomultiplier tube and developing it as an instrument for scientific work, and went on to pioneer the application of photomultiplier tubes as a sensitive focal-plane detector for astronomical applications, resulting in the "Carnegie Image Tube". The first tests of the astronomical applications of his barrier film tubes were done on the 26-inch refractor at the Naval Observatory in Washington, and later at the 40-inch telescope at the Naval Observatory in Flagstaff. By making it possible for astronomical observations to be captured in electronic form, and thus easily transferred to digital form for analysis by computer, the technology revolutionized the data collection method of observational astronomy, and the technology continued to be widely used for astronomical observations until the development of CCD imagers in the 1980s.

=== Observational astronomy ===
In an important paper co-authored with astronomer Vera Rubin in 1970, and a follow-up paper in 1980, Rubin and Ford established that the orbits of stars around the center of galaxies (the "galaxy rotation curve") does not decrease with distance from the galactic center, as expected from Kepler's rotation law, but remains constant (or "flat") with distance. They deduced from this that galaxies contain a large fraction of their mass in the form of some non-luminous component, and calculated that most galaxies must contain about six times as much dark as visible mass. The name now given to this discovery is dark matter.

== See also ==
- Rubin–Ford effect
