= Martha Stahr Carpenter =

American astronomer

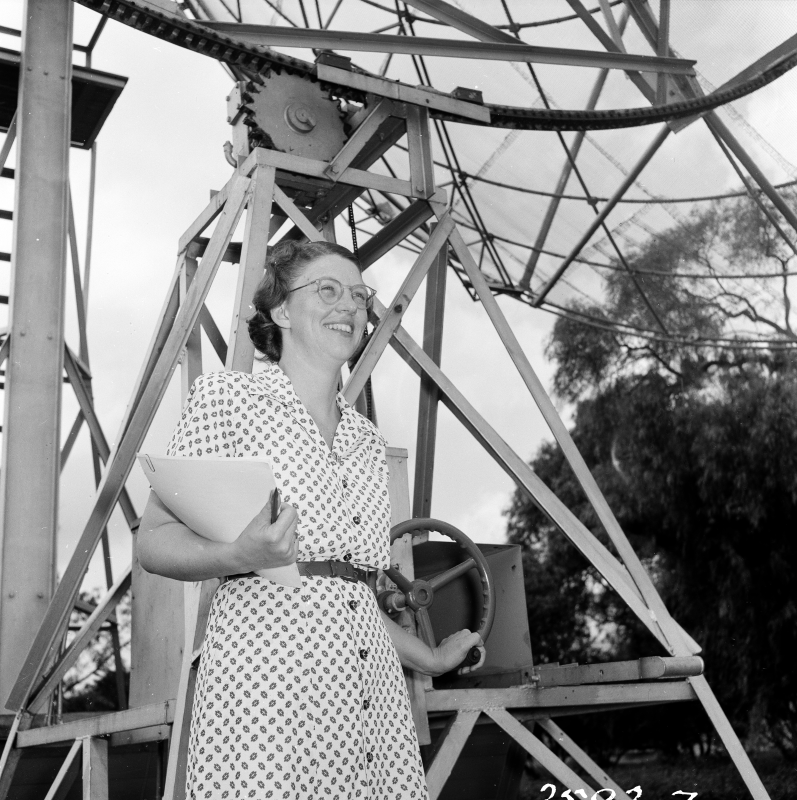
- Born: March 29, 1920
- Died: February 12, 2013 (aged 92)
- Education: University of California, Berkeley (Ph.D. 1945, M.S. 1943); Wellesley College (B.A. 1941)
- Known for: Microwave astronomy Variable stars
- Scientific career
- Fields: Astronomy
- Workplaces: University of Virginia (Associate professor 1973-1986); Cornell University (Assistant professor 1947-1953, Associate professor 1953-1955, Research associate 1955-1969); Wellesley College (Instructor 1945-1947)
- Notable students: Vera Rubin

Martha Stahr Carpenter was an American astronomer and president of the AAVSO for three terms between 1951 and 1954. In 1947, she became the first women faculty member in the Cornell University College of Arts and Sciences. Stahr advised distinguished astronomer Vera Rubin in galactic dynamics while at Cornell, after which, Rubin went on to provide the first evidence for dark matter using galactic rotation curves.

== Research ==
Stahr's research interests included observations of variable stars, galactic structure using 21-cm emission, and microwave radio astronomy. During her graduate studies between 1944 and 1945, she was able to use the Lick Observatory as a student because very few astronomers were around during war time. She recounted in 2011,

"most of the astronomers had left. There was a discussion as to whether a woman could handle the big telescope, [but] I just went up there. The man was there doing all he could to handle it, and it wasn’t before long that I was doing it with him, so they were very glad that the telescope was kept in use, because it was more than one person could handle"

She published the first comprehensive bibliography of scientific literature on microwave radio sources in 1948 and continued to provide updated supplements throughout her career to help astronomers around the world discover and remain informed of recent research done in radio astronomy.
