= Mark O. Robbins =

American condensed matter physicist (1955–2020)

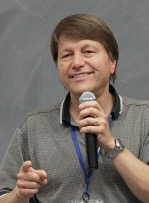
- Waterville, Maine (2010)
- Born: Indianapolis, Indiana, USA
- Died: August 13, 2020 (aged 64); Baltimore, MD
- Education: Harvard University; University of California, Berkeley
- Known for: Elucidation of the fundamental origins of friction, fracture, and adhesion
- Awards: 1999 APS Fellow; 2018 AAAS Fellow
- Scientific career
- Fields: Condensed matter physics, Computational physics
- Workplaces: Johns Hopkins University, Exxon Corp.; Cambridge University
- Doctoral advisor: Leopoldo M. Falicov
- Website: markrobbins.johnshopkins.edu

Mark Owen Robbins was an American condensed matter physicist who specialized in computational studies of friction, fracture and adhesion, with a particular focus on nanotribology, contact mechanics, and polymers. He was a professor in the department of physics and astronomy at Johns Hopkins University at the time of his death.

== Early life and education ==
Robbins was born in Indianapolis, Indiana, and was raised in Newton, Massachusetts. After completing his BA and MA degrees in physics at Harvard University in 1977, he spent a year as a Churchill Fellow at Cambridge University. He completed a Ph.D. in physics at the University of California, Berkeley in 1983.

== Career ==
After graduating from UC Berkeley, Robbins held a three-year appointment as a postdoctoral research fellow at Exxon Corporation's research science laboratory in New Jersey. In 1986, he joined the faculty of the department of physics and astronomy at Johns Hopkins University, where he was promoted to Associate (1988) and Full (1992) professor. He served as chair of the advisory board of the Kavli Institute of Theoretical Physics (KITP) at the University of California, Santa Barbara from 2007 to 2008, and chaired the Gordon Research Conference on Tribology in 2010. He also served as the associate director for the Institute for Data Intensive Engineering and Science.

== Research ==
Robbins was known for his work in the application of molecular simulations to the non equilibrium phenomena of friction, fracture and adhesion. A recurring theme in his research was the elucidation of new physics on the atomic/molecular scale that could not be described by conventional continuum methods, and the use of scaling relations to predict a physical system's behavior at one length or time scale based on how it behaves at another. The scope of his research included the microscopic origins of macro scale friction laws, shear flow of fluids in nanoscale confinement, the toughness of polymer adhesives and the stiffness of elastic contacts..

== Honors and awards ==
- 1986 Presidential Young Investigator Award
- 1987 Sloan Foundation Fellowship
- 1999 Fellow of the American Physical Society, "For his contributions to our understanding of the molecular origins of friction, lubrication, spreading and adhesion."
- 2018 Fellow of the American Association for the Advancement of Science, "For using simulations to reveal the microscopic origins of macroscopic behavior of matter"

== Personal life ==
Robbins was born in Indianapolis, Indiana. He was the eldest of five children raised in Newton, Massachusetts by Dorothy (Bigelow) and Owen Robbins. He married Dr. Patricia McGuiggan, a materials science research professor, in 1993. They were married until his death, and had two children. After traveling to Brazil in the 1980s, Robbins developed an interest in orchids and began collecting and cultivating them at home. By 2003, his orchid collection had grown into the hundreds, and he had created two new varieties that he named after his children. He died at his home in Baltimore, Maryland, on August 13, 2020.
