= Karen Kavanagh =

Canadian physicist

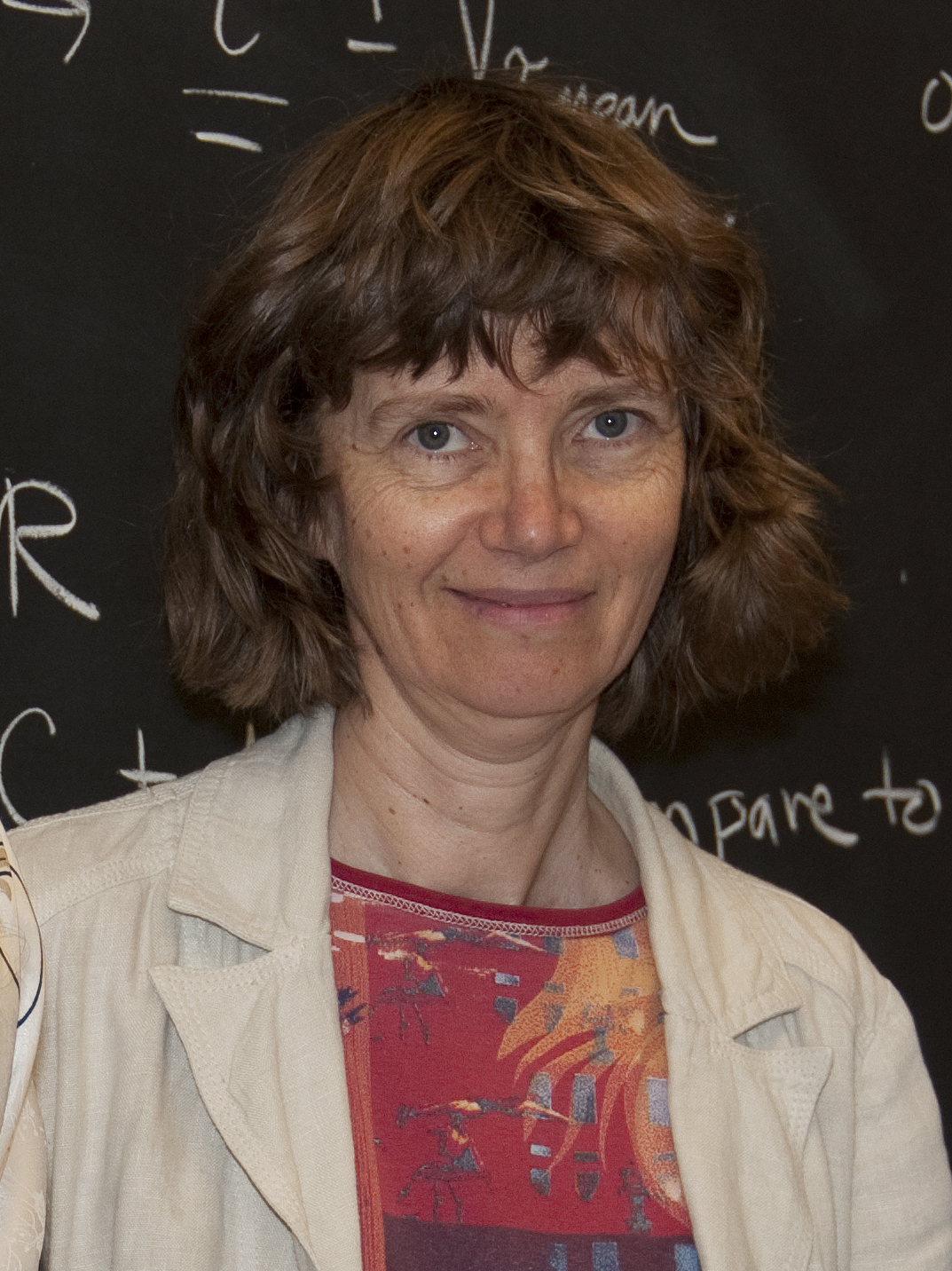
- Kavanagh in 2013

Academic background
- Education: Queen's University (BSc); Cornell University (PhD)

Academic work
- Discipline: Physicist
- Sub-discipline: Semiconductors, nanoscience
- Institutions: Simon Fraser University

Karen L. Kavanagh is a professor of physics at Simon Fraser University in Burnaby, British Columbia, Canada, where she heads the Kavanagh Lab, a research lab working on semiconductor nanoscience.

== Education ==
Kavanagh obtained a BSc in Chemical-Physics from Queen's University in 1978, followed by 3 years at Bell Northern Research in Ottawa in their Advanced Technology Laboratory. She received her PhD in materials science and engineering in 1987 at Cornell University in Ithaca, New York.

== Career ==
After post doctoral work at IBM and MIT, Kavanagh accepted a faculty position in the Electrical and Computer Engineering Dept. at the University of California, San Diego. She has been at Simon Fraser University since 2000.

Her main field of interest is electronic materials science – studying the effects of defects on the properties of semiconductor materials and devices. She has worked on strain relaxation in lattice-mismatched semiconductor heterostructures, diffusion barriers and electrical contacts for silicon and III-V semiconductor based devices, epitaxial growth and nucleation, and electron transport through thin films and interfaces. Her work on characterization tools including electron microscopy, Rutherford backscattering, x-ray diffraction, and scanning probe microscopy.

She is a Fellow of the Institute of Physics and is the author of over 200 journal papers and conference proceedings, as shown on ORCID. In 2022, Kavanagh was selected as a Fellow of the Materials Research Society (MRS).

== Awards ==
- Vancouver YWCA Women of Distinction Award (2006)
- NSERC University Faculty Awardee (1999)
- NSF Presidential Young Investigator Award (1991)
