= Vera Rubin =

American astronomer (1928–2016)

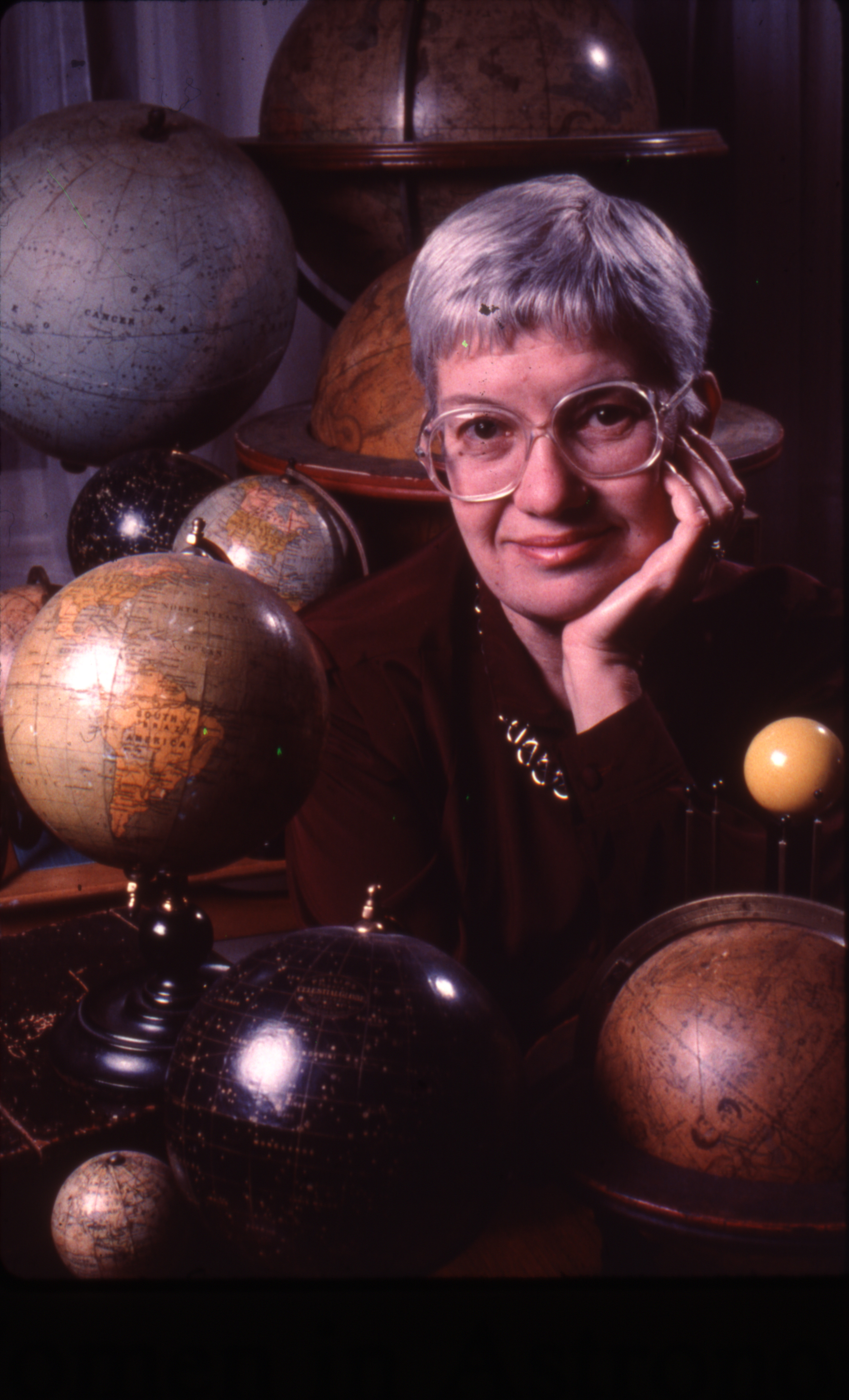
- Rubin with her collection of antique globes, c. 1985
- Born: Vera Florence Cooper; July 23, 1928; Philadelphia, Pennsylvania, U.S.
- Died: December 25, 2016 (aged 88); Princeton, New Jersey, U.S.
- Education: Vassar College (BS); Cornell University (MS); Georgetown University (PhD)
- Known for: Galaxy rotation problem; dark matter; Rubin–Ford effect
- Spouse: Robert Joshua Rubin (m. 1948; died 2008)
- Children: 4, including Karl and Judith
- Awards: Bruce Medal; Dickson Prize in Science; Gold Medal of the Royal Astronomical Society; National Medal of Science
- Scientific career
- Fields: Astronomy
- Workplaces: Georgetown University; Carnegie Institution of Washington
- Thesis: Fluctuations in the Space Distribution of the Galaxies (1954)
- Doctoral advisor: George Gamow
- Other academic advisors: William Shaw; Martha Stahr Carpenter
- Notable students: Sandra Faber; Rebecca Oppenheimer

Vera Florence Cooper Rubin (/ˈruːbɪn/; July 23, 1928 – December 25, 2016) was an American astronomer who pioneered work on galaxy rotation rates. She uncovered the discrepancy between the predicted and observed angular motion of galaxies by studying galactic rotation curves, the first evidence for the galaxy rotation problem, one key piece of evidence for dark matter. Measurements by other astronomers using 21 centimeter hydrogen line radio telescopes clinched the case.

Honored during her lifetime for her work, she received the Bruce Medal, the Gold Medal of the Royal Astronomical Society, and the National Medal of Science, among others. The Vera C. Rubin Observatory in Chile is named in her honor. Her legacy is described by The New York Times as "ushering in a Copernican-scale change" in cosmological theory. Prominent theoretical physicist Lisa Randall and others have argued that Rubin was neglected for the Nobel Prize.

Rubin spent her life advocating for women in science, and mentored aspiring female astronomers.

== Early life and education ==
Vera Cooper was born on July 23, 1928, in Philadelphia, Pennsylvania. She was the younger of two sisters born to a Jewish family with roots in Eastern Europe. Her father, Pesach Kobchefski, immigrated with his mother and three siblings to Gloversville, New York, reuniting with his father who had immigrated a year or two earlier. Pesach soon anglicized his name to Pete Cooper, and as an adult studied electrical engineering and worked at Bell Telephone. He married Rose Applebaum, a second generation American born to a mother who had immigrated from Bessarabia (in present-day Moldova and Ukraine) to Philadelphia. They met at Bell, where Rose worked until they married.

In 1938 the family moved to Washington, D.C., where ten-year-old Vera developed an interest in astronomy while watching the stars from her window. "Even then I was more interested in the question than in the answer," she remembered. "I decided at an early age that we inhabit a very curious world." She built a crude telescope out of cardboard with her father, and began to observe and track meteors. She attended public school at Coolidge Senior High School, graduating in 1944.

Ignoring advice she had received from a high school science teacher to avoid a scientific career and become an artist, the young aspiring astronomer chose instead to pursue her undergraduate education at Vassar College. Vassar, then an all-women's school, was famous for its association with the pioneering 19th century astronomer Maria Mitchell, discoverer of Comet 1847 VI (modern designation C/1847 T1) and a professor at Vassar from the time of the founding of its observatory in 1865.

At Vassar College, Rubin was a member of the honors society Phi Beta Kappa. She earned her bachelor's degree in astronomy in 1948. Despite Vassar's historic reputation for groundbreaking science in the field, Rubin was the only graduate in astronomy that year.

=== Graduate studies ===
Rubin attempted to enroll in the astronomy program at Princeton, but was barred due to her gender (Princeton would retain the policy of gender discrimination against women in its astronomy department until 1975). She was accepted to Harvard's program, but declined the offer on the basis that she was getting married, and her future husband, a graduate student in physics, was based at Cornell University.

Cornell was not known during this period for the excellence of its astronomy department, composed as it was of only four members. It did, however, boast an excellent physics faculty, and much of the coursework for Rubin's degree was taught within this department. Noted physicist Philip Morrison and future Nobelists Hans Bethe and Richard Feynman worked with Rubin during this period.

At Cornell, she worked with astronomer Martha Carpenter on galactic dynamics and studied the motions of galaxies. From this work, Rubin made one of the first observations of deviations from Hubble flow. Though her conclusions – that there was an orbital motion of galaxies around a particular pole – were later disproven, the idea that galaxies were moving held true and sparked further research. Additionally, Rubin's research provided early evidence of the supergalactic plane.

This information and the data she compiled were controversial for their day. Against her advisors' hesitations, she gained permission to present at the annual meeting of American Astronomical Society. Not only was her material in a form that left it open to speculation that it was premature and incompletely supported, she had given birth to her first child three weeks previously and was not a member of the society. These circumstances did not go unnoticed. Her presentation to the AAS in December 1950 received front page headlines ("Young Mother Has Own Theory of Universe", read the lede, disseminated from an article in the Washington Post). The talk received – to Rubin's personal recollection – universally negative feedback and the paper was not published.

She completed her work at Cornell with the award of her 1951 master's degree.

Rubin studied next at Georgetown University, where she earned her Ph.D. in 1954 (under George Gamow, who was at nearby George Washington University), although much of her classwork was completed with Georgetownian Francis Heyden. Her dissertation, completed in 1954, concluded that galaxies clumped together, rather than being randomly distributed through the universe, a controversial idea not pursued by others for two decades.

== Career ==
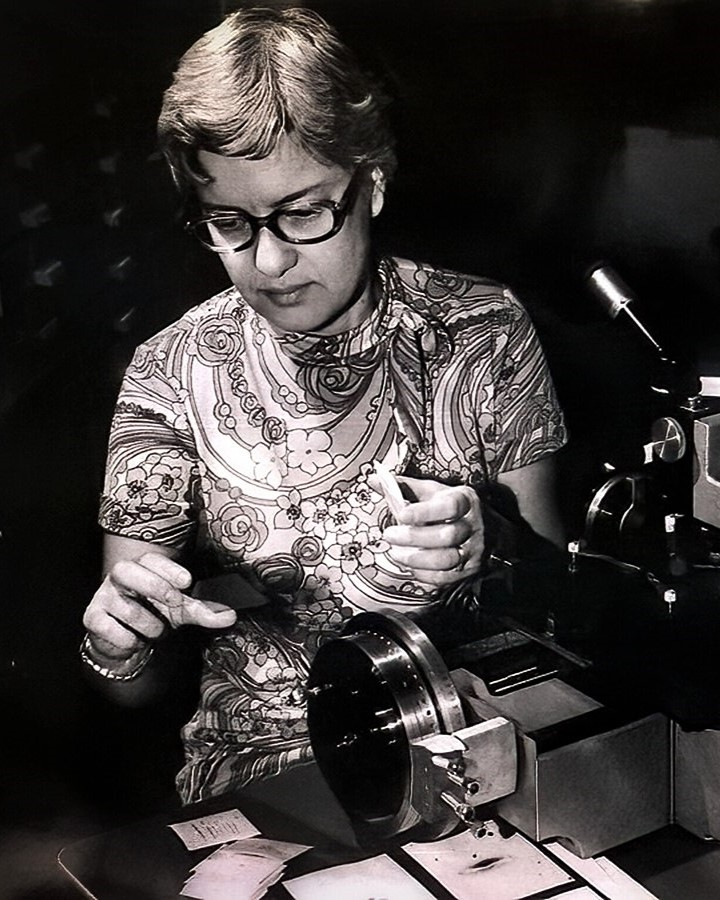
Rubin in 1972, measuring spectra at the Carnegie Institution in Washington, D.C.

For the next decade, Rubin held various short-term academic positions in the greater DC area. She served for a year as an instructor of Mathematics and Physics at Montgomery College, Maryland. Then from 1955 to 1965 she worked at Georgetown University as a research associate astronomer, lecturer (1959–1962), and finally, assistant professor of astronomy (1962–1965).

In the latter position, from 1963, Rubin began a year-long collaboration with Geoffrey and Margaret Burbidge, during which she made her first observations of the rotation of galaxies while using the McDonald Observatory's 82-inch telescope.

She joined the Carnegie Institution of Washington (later called Carnegie Institution of Science) in 1965 as a staff member in the Department of Terrestrial Magnetism. There she met her long-time collaborator, instrument-maker Kent Ford.

During her work at the Carnegie Institution, Rubin applied to become the first female astronomer permitted to observe at the Palomar Observatory in 1965.

An initiating faculty member of the Vatican Observatory Summer School (1986), Rubin continued this relationship through subsequent decades, providing dedication remarks for the opening of the VATT, the Vatican's telescope on Mount Graham.

Rubin retired from the Carnegie Institute in 2014 as Senior Fellow of Astronomy in the Department of Terrestrial Magnetism.

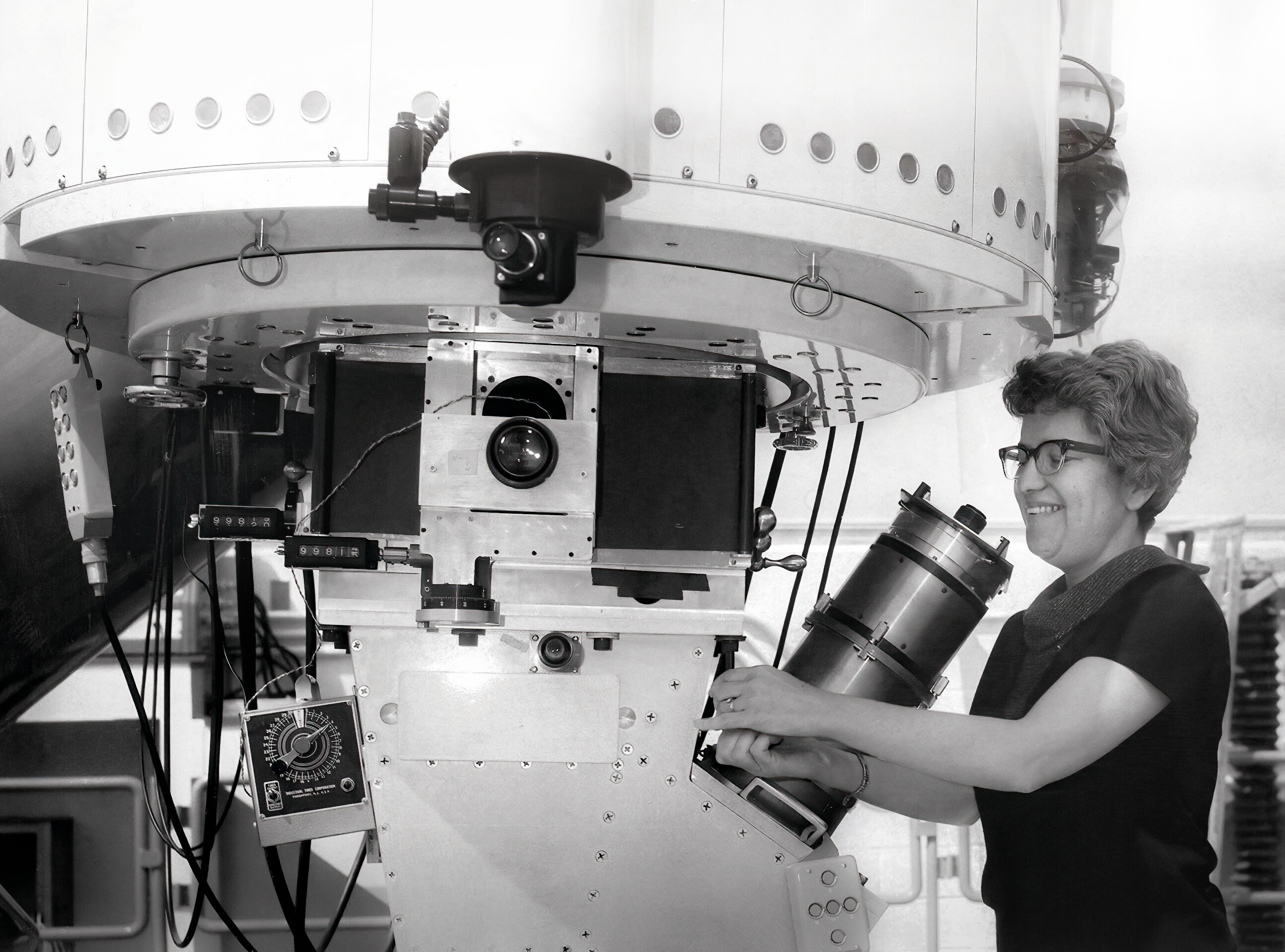
Rubin in the 1970s using Kitt Peak National Observatory's 36-inch telescope with Kent Ford's image tube spectrograph attached

== Research ==
At the Carnegie Institution, Rubin began work related to her controversial thesis regarding galaxy clusters in tandem with Kent Ford, making hundreds of observations using Ford's image-tube spectrograph. This image intensifier allowed resolving the spectra of astronomical objects that were previously too dim for spectral analysis. A decade of observations coalesced in the shared discovery of the Rubin-Ford effect, with publication first appearing in 1976.

=== Rubin–Ford effect ===
The Rubin–Ford effect, an apparent anisotropy in the expansion of the Universe on the scale of 100 million light years, was discovered through studies of spiral galaxies, particularly the Andromeda Galaxy, chosen for its brightness and proximity to Earth. The idea of peculiar motion on this scale in the universe was a highly controversial proposition. It was dismissed by leading astronomers but ultimately shown to be valid. The effect is now known as large scale streaming.

=== Galactic motion ===
Rubin and Kent also briefly studied quasars, which had been discovered in the early 1960s and were a popular topic of research. Wishing to avoid controversial areas of astronomy, including quasars and galactic motion, Rubin began to study the rotation and outer reaches of galaxies, an interest sparked by her collaboration with the Burbidges.

==== Rotational curves ====
She investigated the rotation curves of spiral galaxies, again beginning with Andromeda, by looking at their outermost material. She observed flat rotation curves: the outermost components of the galaxy were moving as quickly as those close to the center. She further uncovered the discrepancy between the predicted angular motion of galaxies based on the visible light and the observed motion. Her research showed that spiral galaxies rotate quickly enough that they should fly apart, if the gravity of their constituent stars was all that was holding them together; because they stay intact, a large amount of unseen mass must be holding them together, a conundrum that became known as the galaxy rotation problem.

Rubin's results came to be cited as evidence that spiral galaxies were surrounded by dark matter haloes. Rubin's calculations showed that galaxies must contain at least five to ten times more mass than can be observed directly based on the light emitted by ordinary matter. Rubin's results were confirmed over subsequent decades, and became the first persuasive results supporting the theory of dark matter, initially proposed by Fritz Zwicky in the 1930s. This data was confirmed by radio astronomers, the discovery of the cosmic microwave background, and images of gravitational lensing. However, Rubin did not rule out alternative models to dark matter also inspired by her measurements. She and her research were discussed in the 1991 PBS series, The Astronomers.

==== Counter-rotation ====
Another area of interest for Rubin was the phenomenon of counter-rotation in galaxies. Her discovery that some gas and stars moved in the opposite direction to the rotation of the rest of the galaxy challenged the prevailing theory that all of the material in a galaxy moved in the same direction, and provided the first evidence for galaxy mergers and the process by which galaxies initially formed.

== Activism for women in astronomy ==
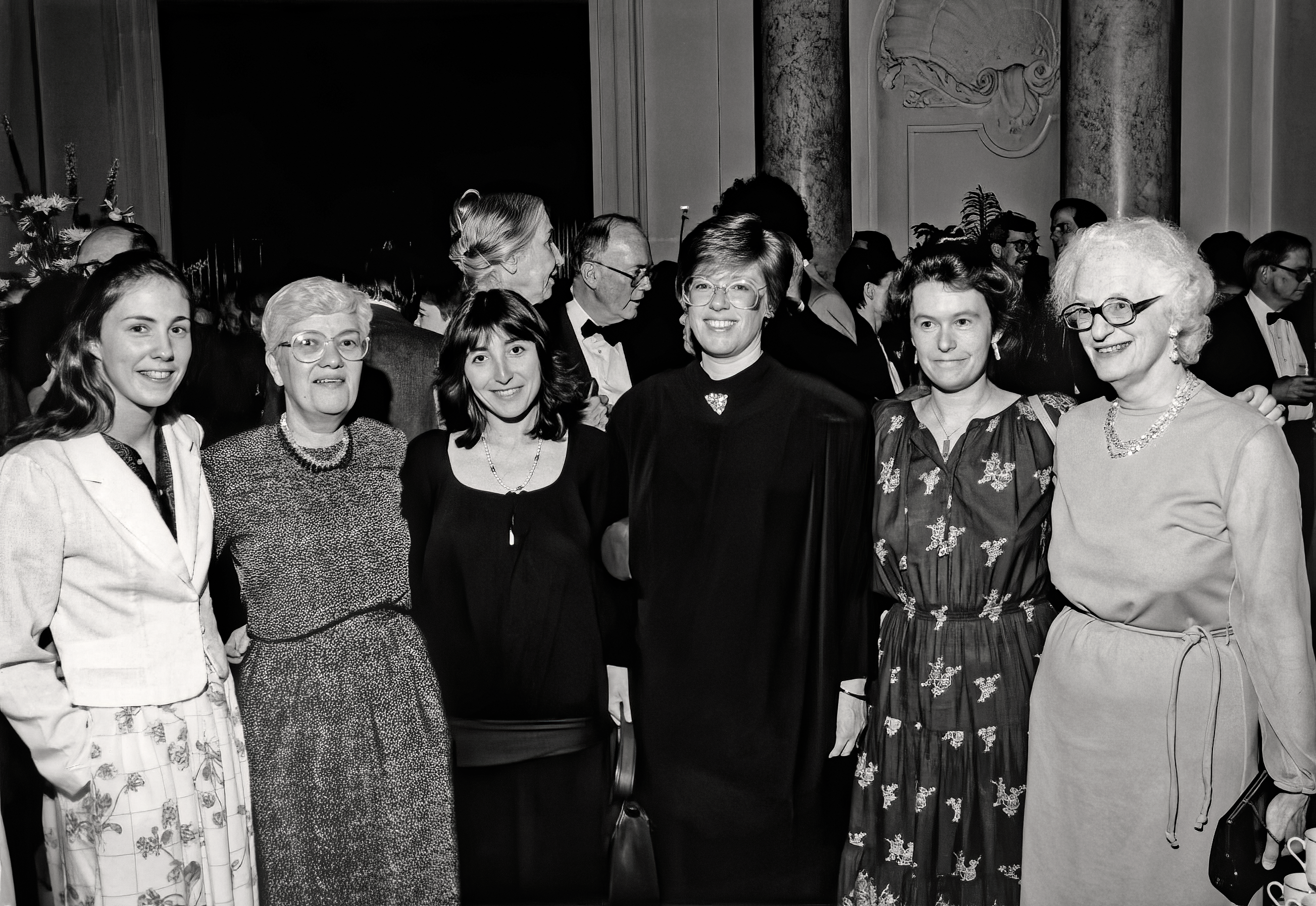
Famous astronomers: Vera Rubin (2nd from left), Wendy Freedman (3rd), Sandra Faber (4th), Nancy Roman (6th). 1988

During her work at the Carnegie Institution, Rubin applied to observe at the Palomar Observatory in 1965, despite the fact that the building did not have facilities for women. Reluctantly granted access, she was informed "your time on the observatory is limited, because we don't have a women's bathroom," a common period ruse to avoid allowing women access to these stations (Margaret Burbridge faced similar discrimination at Carnegie a decade previous, when she gained access to the telescope at the Mount Wilson Observatory via the pretense that husband Geoffrey was the telescope operator). According to Carnegie president Eric Isaacs, Rubin "solved the problem pretty simply by cutting out a little paper skirt and taping it to the stick figure image of a man which was on the men's room door. And she turned around and said, 'now you have a ladies' room' and then she got to work."

Throughout her graduate studies, Rubin encountered discouraging sexism; in one incident she was not allowed to meet with her advisor in his office, because women were not allowed in that area of Georgetown, a Catholic university. Motivated by her own battles to gain credibility in a field dominated by male astronomers, Rubin encouraged girls interested in investigating the universe to pursue their dreams. She was described by Sandra Faber and Neta Bahcall as one of the astronomers who paved the way for other women in the field, as a "guiding light" for those who wished to have families and careers in astronomy. Rebecca Oppenheimer also recalled Rubin's mentorship as important to her early career.

When Rubin was elected to the National Academy of Sciences (NAS) in 1981, she became only the second woman astronomer in its ranks (after her colleague Margaret Burbidge). She, alongside Burbidge, advocated for more women to be elected to the NAS, selected for review panels, and represented in academic searches. She said that despite her own election to the NAS, she continued to be dissatisfied with the low number of women who were elected each year, and she further said it was "the saddest part of [her] life".

Throughout her life, Rubin faced discouraging comments on her choice of study but persevered, as she was supported by family and colleagues. In addition to encouraging women in astronomy, she was a force for greater recognition of women in the sciences and for scientific literacy.

== Personal life ==
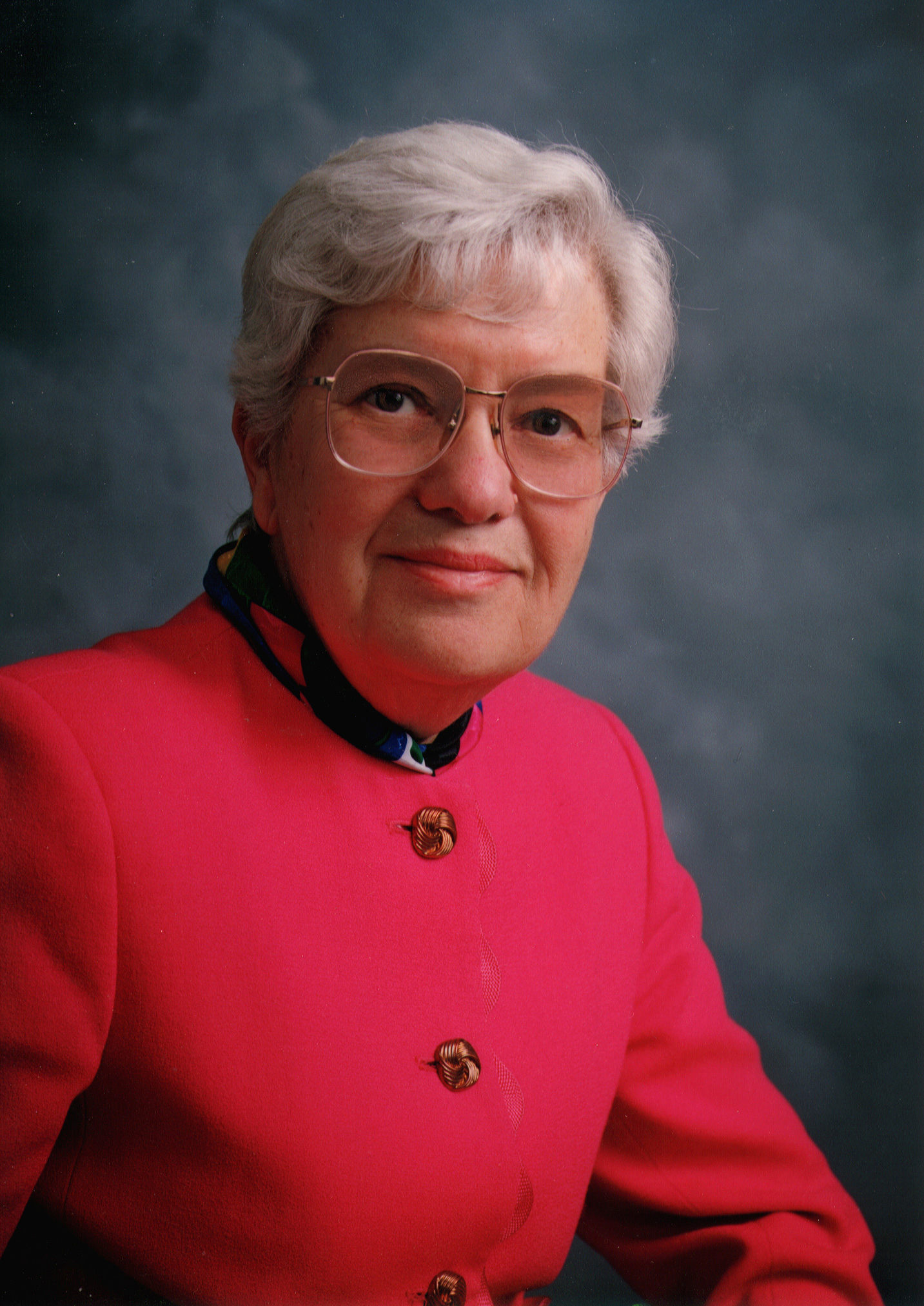
Vera Rubin

Rubin married in 1948, when her husband, Robert Joshua Rubin, was a graduate student at Cornell University, and she herself had recently graduated from Vassar. She was 23 years old and pregnant with her second child when she began her doctoral studies.

By 1963, Rubin, working and with four children, was described as the sole member of Vassar's class of 1948 as having "come near to filling the Utopian aim of being a full-time professional in her field without, for the most part, putting her children into someone else's hands". Rubin ascribed this characterization to the "unique part time full time" nature of her then position at Georgetown University. Because she had young children, she did much of her work from home.

All four of their children earned PhDs in the natural sciences or mathematics: David (born 1950), is a geologist with the U.S. Geological Survey; Judith Young (1952–2014), was an astronomer at the University of Massachusetts Amherst; Karl (born 1956), is a mathematician at the University of California, Irvine; and Allan (born 1960), is a geologist at Princeton University. Rubin's children recalled later in life that their mother made a life of science appear desirable and fun, which inspired them to become scientists themselves.

Rubin was Jewish, and she said she saw no conflict between science and religion. In an interview, she said: "In my own life, my science and my religion are separate. I'm Jewish, and so religion to me is a kind of moral code and a kind of history. I try to do my science in a moral way, and, I believe that, ideally, science should be looked upon as something that helps us understand our role in the universe."

Rubin's older sister, Ruth Cooper Burg, was an attorney who later worked as an administrative law judge in the United States Department of Defense.

In the early 2000s, Vera Rubin was still actively engaged in scientific work, and in 2013 articles with her participation were still being published. In 2008, Robert Joshua Rubin, Vera Rubin's husband, with whom she had been married for about 60 years, died.

Rubin died of natural causes at age 88 on the night of December 25, 2016. She had dementia and was living in an assisted living facility. Rubin was memorialized by her colleagues at the Carnegie Institution, where she performed the bulk of her work and research, as a national treasure.

== Legacy ==
=== Nobel Prize controversy ===
Rubin is "widely thought to have been snubbed for the Nobel Prize". In the decade following her death, there has been significant ongoing disagreement as to why Rubin's work was not recognized with a Nobel Prize. Some assume it was "because of her gender," while physicists such as Lisa Randall and Emily Levesque have argued that it was an oversight. Others have argued that it was a "glaring omission". Popularly written articles like Forbes' "Who Really Discovered Dark Matter: Fritz Zwicky Or Vera Rubin?" both characterize Rubin's failure to be awarded a Nobel Prize as an egregious snub and equivocate regarding the specific science on which this honor would have been conferred.

Discussion of the issue continues, as posthumous honors and recognition (see below) have proliferated, and Rubin's name is regularly mentioned in articles listing the 20th century women who missed out on Nobel Prizes.

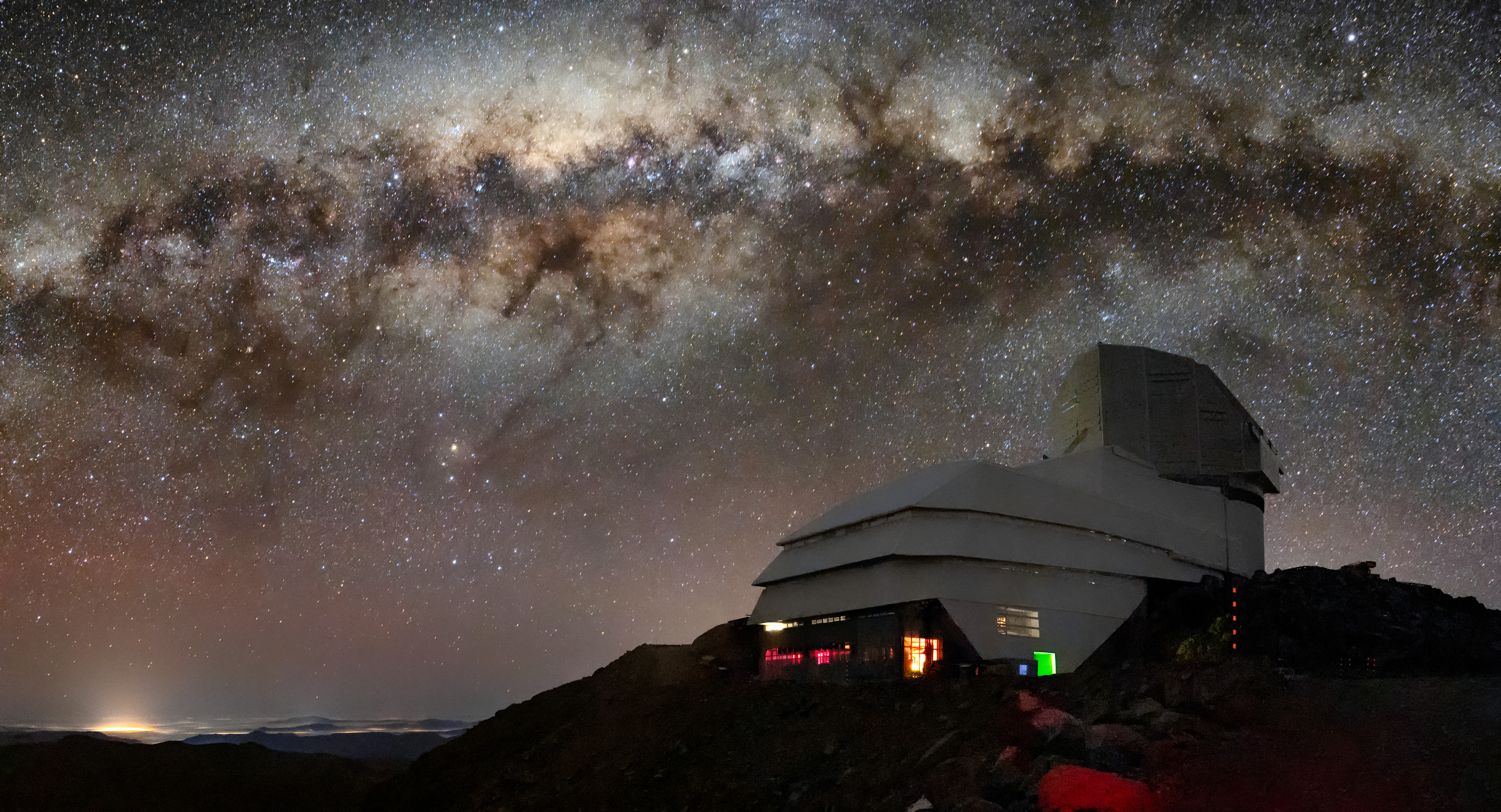
The Vera C. Rubin Observatory and the Milky Way

=== Vera C. Rubin Observatory ===
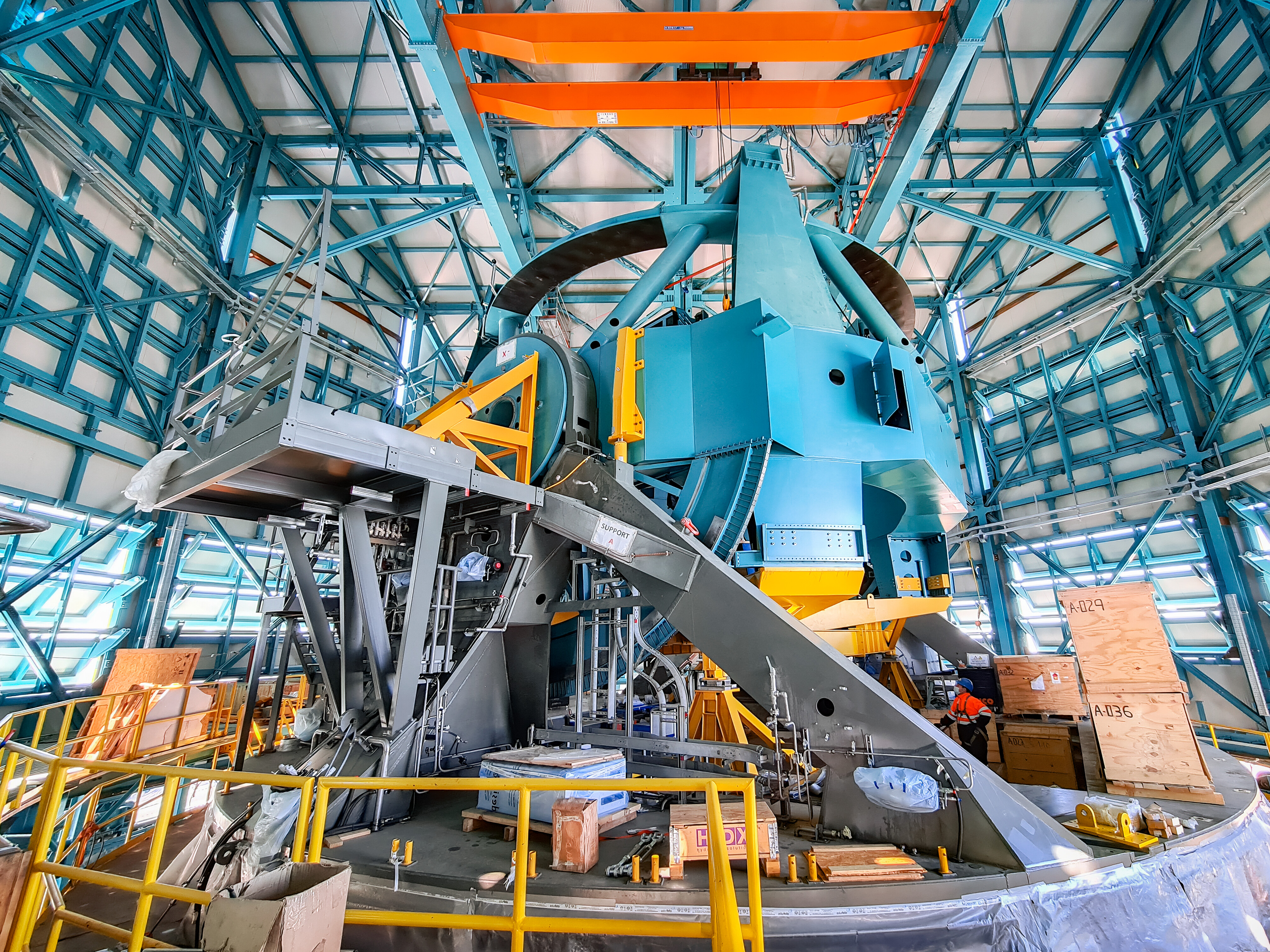
Telescope Mount Assembly of the 8.4-meter Simonyi Survey Telescope at Vera C. Rubin Observatory, under construction atop Cerro Pachón in Chile

On December 20, 2019, the Large Synoptic Survey Telescope was renamed the Vera C. Rubin Observatory in recognition of Rubin's contributions to the study of dark matter and her outspoken advocacy for the equal treatment and representation of women in science. The observatory is located on a mountain in Cerro Pachón, Chile and observations will focus on the study of dark matter and dark energy. As of April 2025, the telescope had begun operation and was producing images and volumes of new data.

=== Additional recognition ===
- In 2002, Discover magazine recognized Rubin as one of the 50 most important women in science.
- On November 6, 2020, a satellite named after her (ÑuSat 18 or "Vera", COSPAR 2020-079K) was launched into space.
- An area on Mars, Vera Rubin Ridge, is named after her, as well as the asteroid 5726 Rubin.
- Rubin is honored on a 2025 U.S. quarter as part of the final year of the American Women quarters program.
- In 2024, Nvidia announced that their next generation of data center accelerators would be named after her, with the CPU named Vera and GPU named Rubin.
- The Carnegie Institution has created a postdoctoral research fund in Rubin's honor.
- The Division on Dynamical Astronomy of the American Astronomical Society has named the Vera Rubin Early Career Prize in her honor. It seeks to recognize excellence in dynamical astronomy.

=== Media ===
- The Verubin Nebula, which appears in season three of Star Trek: Discovery, is named after Rubin.
- Rubin was featured in an animated segment of the 13th and final episode of Cosmos: A Spacetime Odyssey.

== Awards and honors ==
Following her 1981 election as the second woman ever to the National Academy of Sciences, Rubin and her work received numerous accolades.

Rubin's perspective on the history of the work on galaxy movements was presented in a review, "One Hundred Years of Rotating Galaxies," for the Publications of the Astronomical Society of the Pacific in 2000. This was an adaptation of the lecture she gave in 1996 upon receiving the Gold Medal of the Royal Astronomical Society, the second woman to be so honored, 168 years after Caroline Herschel received the Medal in 1828.

- National Space Grant Distinguished Service Award (2010)
- Adler Planetarium Lifetime Achievement Award (2009)
- Richtmyer Memorial Award (2008)
- James Craig Watson Medal of the National Academy of Sciences (2004)
- Catherine Wolfe Bruce Gold Medal of the Astronomical Society of the Pacific (2003)
- Gruber International Cosmology Prize (2002)
- Gold Medal of the Royal Astronomical Society (1996) (the first women to receive this honor since Caroline Herschel, awarded the prize in 1828)
- Weizmann Women & Science Award (1996)
- Member, Pontifical Academy of Sciences (appointed 1996)
- Member, American Philosophical Society (elected 1995)
- Henry Norris Russell Lectureship, American Astronomical Society (1994)
- Dickson Prize for Science (1994)
- Jansky Lectureship before the National Radio Astronomy Observatory (1994)
- National Medal of Science (1993)
- Member, National Academy of Sciences (elected 1981)

In addition to this list, Rubin was granted honorary doctorates from Harvard University, Yale University, Smith College, Grinnell College, and Princeton University (2005).

== Publications ==
=== Books ===
- Rubin, Vera (1997). Bright Galaxies, Dark Matters. Masters of Modern Physics. Woodbury, New York City: Springer Verlag/AIP Press. ISBN 978-1563962318.

=== Articles ===
Rubin published over 150 scientific papers. The following are a selection of articles identified by the scientists and historians of the Contributions of 20th Century Women to Physics project (CWP), as being representative of her most important writings.

- Rubin, Vera; Ford, W. Kent Jr. (1970). "Rotation of the Andromeda Nebula from a Spectroscopic Survey of Emission Regions". The Astrophysical Journal. 159: 379ff. Bibcode:1970ApJ...159..379R. doi:10.1086/150317. S2CID 122756867.
- Rubin, Vera; Roberts, M. S.; Graham, J. A.; Ford Jr., W. K.; Thonnard, N. (1976). "Motion of the Galaxy and the Local Group Determined from the Velocity Anisotropy of Distant Sc I Galaxies. I. The Data". The Astronomical Journal. 81: 687. Bibcode:1976AJ.....81..687R. doi:10.1086/111942.
- Rubin, Vera; Roberts, M. S.; Graham, J. A.; Ford Jr., W. K.; Thonnard, N. (1976). "Motion of the Galaxy and the Local Group Determined from the Velocity Anisotropy of Distant Sc I Galaxies. II. The Analysis for the Motion". The Astronomical Journal. 81: 719ff. Bibcode:1976AJ.....81..719R. doi:10.1086/111943.
- Rubin, Vera; Thonnard, N.; Ford, Jr., W. K. (1980). "Rotational Properties of 21 SC Galaxies With a Large Range of Luminosities and Radii, From NGC 4605 (R=4kpc) to UGC 2885 (R=122kpc)". The Astrophysical Journal. 238: 471ff. Bibcode:1980ApJ...238..471R. doi:10.1086/158003.
- Rubin, Vera; Burstein, D.; Ford, Jr., W. K.; Thonnard, N. (1985). "Rotation Velocities of 16 SA Galaxies and a Comparison of Sa, Sb, and SC Rotation Properties". The Astrophysical Journal. 289: 81ff. Bibcode:1985ApJ...289...81R. doi:10.1086/162866.
- Rubin, Vera; Graham, J. A.; Kenney, J. D. P. (1992). "Cospatial Counterrotating Stellar Disks in the Virgo E7/S0 Galaxy NGC 4550". The Astrophysical Journal. 394: L9–L12. Bibcode:1992ApJ...394L...9R. doi:10.1086/186460.
- Rubin, Vera (1995). "A Century of Galaxy Spectroscopy". The Astrophysical Journal. 451: 419ff. Bibcode:1995ApJ...451..419R. doi:10.1086/176230. The abstract of this is also generally available.

== Quotations ==
"Don't let anyone keep you down for silly reasons such as who you are. And don't worry about prizes and fame. The real prize is finding something new out there."
