= Joann Stock =

American geologist

Joann Miriam Stock
- Born: October 9, 1959; Boston, MA
- Education: Massachusetts Institute of Technology
- Scientific career
- Workplaces: California Institute of Technology
- Thesis: Kinematic constraints on the evolution of the Gulf of California Extension Province, Northeastern Baja California, Mexico (1988)
- Doctoral advisor: Kip V. Hodges

Joann Stock is a professor at California Institute of Technology known for her research into plate tectonics, particularly on changes in plate boundaries over geological time.

== Education and career ==
Stock earned her B.S. from Massachusetts Institute of Technology in 1981, and went on college field trip to Greece which grabbed her interest in geology. She "liked learning things that nobody knew before" and was particularly interested in earthquakes on the sea floor. She went on to earn an M.S. (1981) and a Ph.D. from Massachusetts Institute of Technology (1988). From 1988 until 1992 she was on the Geology and Geophysics faculty at Harvard University, and then she moved to the California Institute of Technology where she was promoted to professor in 1998. From 1995 until 2000 she was also an adjunct investigator at the Centro de Investigación Científica y de Educación Superior de Ensenada.

== Research ==
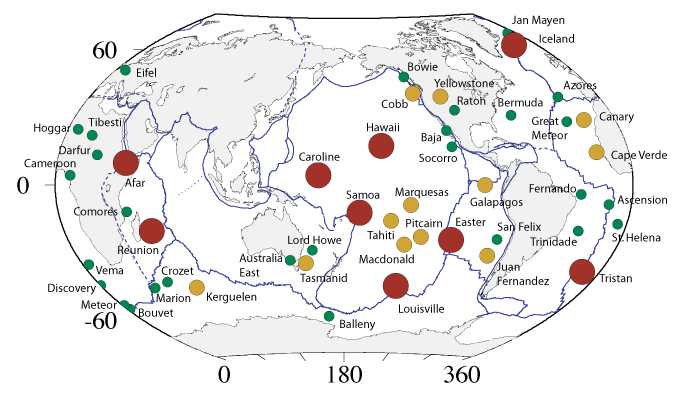
Postulated "hot spots" as categorized by Courtillot, Davaille, Besse, and Joann Stock in a 2003 publication in Earth and Planetary Science Letters

Stock is known for her research into plate tectonics, especially the uncertainties associated with determining the location of tectonic plates in the past. Through her collaboration with Peter Molnar, Stock has examined the movement of plates in the Cenozoic and in the period since the Late Cretaceous. Stock has also defined the positions of tectonic plates in the Late Cretaceous and the Paleogene. Her work includes a reconstruction of the interactions between the Pacific plate and the North America plates, and a description of the transfer of Baja California to the North American Plate. Stock's work also addresses how mantle hot spots begin and variability in the position of hot spots.

=== Selected publications ===
- Stock, Joann; Molnar, Peter (1988). "Uncertainties and implications of the Late Cretaceous and Tertiary position of North America relative to the Farallon, Kula, and Pacific Plates". Tectonics. 7 (6): 1339–1384. Bibcode:1988Tecto...7.1339S. doi:10.1029/TC007i006p01339. ISSN 1944-9194.
- Courtillot, Vincent; Davaille, Anne; Besse, Jean; Stock, Joann (January 2003). "Three distinct types of hotspots in the Earth's mantle". Earth and Planetary Science Letters. 205 (3–4): 295–308. Bibcode:2003E&PSL.205..295C. doi:10.1016/S0012-821X(02)01048-8. ISSN 0012-821X.
- Molnar, Peter; Stock, Joann M. (2009). "Slowing of India's convergence with Eurasia since 20 Ma and its implications for Tibetan mantle dynamics". Tectonics. 28 (3): n/a. Bibcode:2009Tecto..28.3001M. doi:10.1029/2008TC002271. ISSN 1944-9194. S2CID 12734913.
- Cande, Steven C.; Stock, Joann M.; Müller, R. Dietmar; Ishihara, Takemi (March 2000). "Cenozoic motion between East and West Antarctica". Nature. 404 (6774): 145–150. Bibcode:2000Natur.404..145C. doi:10.1038/35004501. PMID 10724159. S2CID 4399729.
- Molnar, Peter; Stock, Joann (June 1987). "Relative motions of hotspots in the Pacific, Atlantic and Indian Oceans since late Cretaceous time". Nature. 327 (6123): 587–591. Bibcode:1987Natur.327..587M. doi:10.1038/327587a0. ISSN 1476-4687. S2CID 4330873.

== Awards and honors ==
- Guggenheim Fellowship (2004)
- Presidential Young Investigator Award (1990-1995)
- Fellow, Geological Society of America (2009)
- Fellow, American Geophysical Union (2010)
