= Robert Joshua Rubin =

American mathematician and physicist (1926–2008)

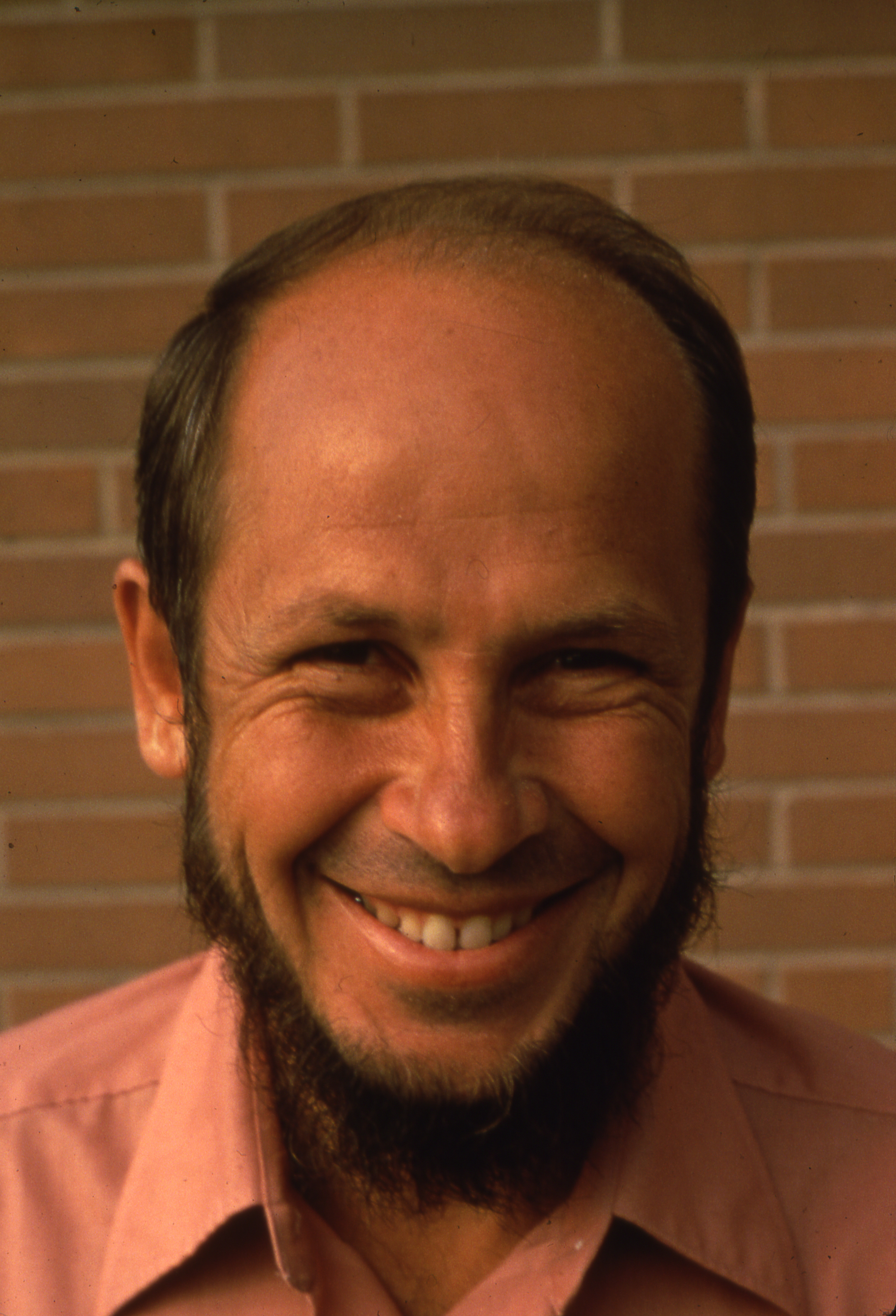
- Rubin in 1972
- Born: August 17, 1926; New York, New York
- Died: January 18, 2008 (aged 81); Washington, District of Columbia
- Education: Cornell University
- Spouse: Vera Rubin (m. 1948)
- Scientific career
- Fields: Mathematics
- Workplaces: Johns Hopkins Applied Physics Laboratory, University of Illinois, Los Alamos National Laboratory, National Bureau of Standards, National Institutes of Health

Robert Joshua Rubin (/ˈruːbɪn/; August 17, 1926 – January 18, 2008) was an American mathematician whose work involved modelling complex physical systems. He was married to astronomer Vera Rubin.

== Early life and education ==
Robert Joshua Rubin was born in New York state to Benjamin Rubin, an artist, and Bess, a stenographer. While in elementary school, he became a serious tennis player, an activity in which he would remain active through his college years.

Initially enrolled at Johns Hopkins University, Rubin's studies were interrupted by the advent of World War II. He enlisted in the Navy. After the war ended, the Navy sent him to study chemical engineering at Cornell University on the V-12 program, where he played on the tennis team and completed his B.S. in 1947. He became engaged to Vera Florence Cooper in late 1947 before returning to Cornell for graduate work in the spring of 1948.

Robert and Vera were married in July 1948 following her graduation from Vassar College.

He received his Ph.D. in chemistry from Cornell in 1951; his doctoral advisor was Peter Debye.

== Career ==
Following completion of his Ph.D., Rubin worked at the Johns Hopkins Applied Physics Laboratory in Washington until 1955, when he became a visiting assistant professor of physical chemistry at the University of Illinois.

Returning to Washington in 1957, and he joined the National Bureau of Standards (later the National Institute of Standards and Technology) as a physicist. He also was on their tennis team.

During the 1960s, his family spent summers in the West, where Rubin worked at Los Alamos National Laboratory in New Mexico and at the National Bureau of Standards in Boulder, Colo.

== Personal life ==
From 1948 until his death in 2008, he was married to Vera Rubin. After many years in which Vera arranged her education and employment to follow his schedule, Rubin eventually prioritised Vera's travel for research and observing.

Their four children include Judith Young (astronomer) and Karl Rubin (mathematician).

== Associations ==
Rubin was a Fellow of the American Association for the Advancement of Science and also a Fellow of the American Physical Society.
