= CEILIDH =

Cryptosystem

CEILIDH is a public key cryptosystem based on the discrete logarithm problem in algebraic torus. This idea was first introduced by Alice Silverberg and Karl Rubin in 2003; Silverberg named CEILIDH after her cat. The main advantage of the system is the reduced size of the keys for the same security over basic schemes.

== Algorithms ==
=== Parameters ===
- Let $q$ be a prime power.
- An integer $n$ is chosen such that :
  - The torus $T_n$ has an explicit rational parametrization.
  - $\Phi_n(q)$ is divisible by a big prime $l$ where $\Phi_n$ is the $n^\mathrm{th}$ Cyclotomic polynomial.
- Let $m=\phi(n)$ where $\phi$ is the Euler function.
- Let $\rho \colon T_n(\mathbb{F}_q) \rightarrow {\mathbb{F}_q}^m$ a birational map and its inverse $\psi$.
- Choose $\alpha \in T_n$ of order $l$ and let $g=\rho(\alpha)$.

=== Key agreement scheme ===
This Scheme is based on the Diffie-Hellman key agreement.

- Alice chooses a random number $a\ \pmod{\Phi_n(q)}$.
- She computes $P_A= \rho(\psi(g)^a) \in \mathbb{F}_q^m$ and sends it to Bob.
- Bob chooses a random number $b\ \pmod{\Phi_n(q)}$.
- He computes $P_B= \rho(\psi(g)^b) \in \mathbb{F}_q^m$ and sends it to Alice.
- Alice computes $\rho(\psi(P_B)^a) \in \mathbb{F}_q^m$
- Bob computes $\rho(\psi(P_A)^b) \in \mathbb{F}_q^m$

$\psi \circ \rho$ is the identity, thus we have: $\rho(\psi(P_B)^a) = \rho(\psi(P_A)^b) = \rho(\psi(g)^{ab})$, which is the shared secret of Alice and Bob.

=== Encryption scheme ===
This scheme is based on the ElGamal encryption.

- Key Generation
  - Alice chooses a random number $a\ \pmod{ \Phi_n(q)}$ as her private key.
  - The resulting public key is $P_A= \rho(\psi(g)^a) \in \mathbb{F}_q^m$.
- Encryption
  - The message $M$ is an element of $\mathbb{F}_q^m$.
  - Bob chooses a random integer $k$ in the range $1\leq k \leq l-1$.
  - Bob computes $\gamma = \rho(\psi(g)^k) \in \mathbb{F}_q^m$ and $\delta = \rho(\psi(M)\psi(P_A)^k) \in \mathbb{F}_q^m$.
  - Bob sends the ciphertext $(\gamma,\delta)$ to Alice.
- Decryption
  - Alice computes $M = \rho(\psi(\delta)\psi(\gamma)^{-a})$.

== Security ==
The CEILIDH scheme is based on the ElGamal scheme and thus has similar security properties.

If the computational Diffie-Hellman assumption holds the underlying cyclic group $G$, then the encryption function is one-way. If the decisional Diffie-Hellman assumption (DDH) holds in $G$, then CEILIDH achieves semantic security. Semantic security is not implied by the computational Diffie-Hellman assumption alone. See decisional Diffie-Hellman assumption for a discussion of groups where the assumption is believed to hold.

CEILIDH encryption is unconditionally malleable, and therefore is not secure under chosen ciphertext attack. For example, given an encryption $(c_1, c_2)$ of some (possibly unknown) message $m$, one can easily construct a valid encryption $(c_1, 2 c_2)$ of the message $2m$.
