= Algebraic torus =

Specific algebraic group

In mathematics, an algebraic torus, where a one dimensional torus is typically denoted by $\mathbf G_{\mathbf m}$, $\mathbb{G}_m$, $\mathbb{T}$, or $\operatorname{GL}(1)$, is a type of commutative affine algebraic group commonly found in projective algebraic geometry and toric geometry. Higher dimensional algebraic tori can be modelled as a product of algebraic groups $\mathbf G_{\mathbf m}$. These groups were named by analogy with the theory of tori in Lie group theory (see Cartan subgroup). For example, over the complex numbers $\mathbb{C}$ the algebraic torus $\mathbf G_{\mathbf m}$ is isomorphic to the group scheme $\mathbb{C}^* = \text{Spec}(\mathbb{C}[t,t^{-1}])$, which is the scheme theoretic analogue of the Lie group $U(1) \subset \mathbb{C}$. In fact, any $\mathbf G_{\mathbf m}$-action on a complex vector space can be pulled back to a $U(1)$-action from the inclusion $U(1) \subset \mathbb{C}^*$ as real manifolds.

Tori are of fundamental importance in the theory of algebraic groups and Lie groups and in the study of the geometric objects associated to them such as symmetric spaces and buildings.

== Algebraic tori over fields ==
In most places we suppose that the base field is perfect (for example finite or characteristic zero). This hypothesis is required to have a smooth group scheme^{pg 64}, since for an algebraic group $G$ to be smooth over characteristic $p$, the maps
$$(\cdot)^{p^r}:\mathcal{O}(G) \to \mathcal{O}(G)$$
must be geometrically reduced for large enough $r$, meaning the image of the corresponding map on $G$ is smooth for large enough $r$.

In general one has to use separable closures instead of algebraic closures.

=== Multiplicative group of a field ===
If $F$ is a field then the multiplicative group over $F$ is the algebraic group $\mathbf G_{\mathbf m}$ such that for any field extension $E/F$ the $E$-points are isomorphic to the group $E^\times$. To define it properly as an algebraic group one can take the affine variety defined by the equation $xy = 1$ in the affine plane over $F$ with coordinates $x, y$. The multiplication is then given by restricting the regular rational map $F^2 \times F^2 \to F^2$ defined by $((x, y), (x',y')) \mapsto (xx', yy')$ and the inverse is the restriction of the regular rational map $(x, y) \mapsto (y, x)$.

=== Definition ===
Let $F$ be a field with algebraic closure $\overline F$. Then a $F$-torus is an algebraic group defined over $F$ which is isomorphic over $\overline F$ to a finite product of copies of the multiplicative group.

In other words, if $\mathbf T$ is an $F$-group it is a torus if and only if $\mathbf T(\overline F) \cong (\overline F^\times)^r$ for some $r \ge 1$. The basic terminology associated to tori is as follows.

- The integer $r$ is called the rank or absolute rank of the torus $\mathrm T$.
- The torus is said to be split over a field extension $E/F$ if $\mathbf T(E) \cong (E^\times)^r$. There is a unique minimal finite extension of $F$ over which $\mathbf T$ is split, which is called the splitting field of $\mathbf T$.
- The $F$-rank of $\mathbf T$ is the maximal rank of a split sub-torus of $\mathbf T$. A torus is split if and only if its $F$-rank equals its absolute rank.
- A torus is said to be anisotropic if its $F$-rank is zero.

=== Isogenies ===
An isogeny between algebraic groups is a surjective morphism with finite kernel; two tori are said to be isogenous if there exists an isogeny from the first to the second. Isogenies between tori are particularly well-behaved: for any isogeny $\phi:\mathbf T \to \mathbf T'$ there exists a "dual" isogeny $\psi: \mathbf T' \to \mathbf T$ such that $\psi \circ \phi$ is a power map. In particular being isogenous is an equivalence relation between tori.

=== Examples ===
==== Over an algebraically closed field ====
Over any algebraically closed field $k = \overline{k}$ there is up to isomorphism a unique torus of any given rank. For a rank $n$ algebraic torus over $k$ this is given by the group scheme $\mathbf{G}_m^n = \text{Spec}_k(k[t_1,t_1^{-1},\ldots,t_n,t_n^{-1}])$^{pg 230}.

==== Over the real numbers ====
Over the field of real numbers $\mathbb R$ there are exactly (up to isomorphism) two tori of rank 1:

- the split torus $\mathbb R^\times$
- the compact form, which can be realised as the unitary group $\mathbf U(1)$ or as the special orthogonal group $\mathrm{SO}(2)$. It is an anisotropic torus. As a Lie group, it is also isomorphic to the 1-torus $\mathbf T^1$, which explains the picture of diagonalisable algebraic groups as tori.

Any real torus is isogenous to a finite sum of those two; for example the real torus $\mathbb C^\times$ is doubly covered by (but not isomorphic to) $\mathbb R^\times \times \mathbb T^1$. This gives an example of isogenous, non-isomorphic tori.

==== Over a finite field ====
Over the finite field $\mathbb F_q$ there are two rank-1 tori: the split one, of cardinality $q-1$, and the anisotropic one of cardinality $q+1$. The latter can be realised as the matrix group
$$\left\{ \begin{pmatrix} t & du \\ u & t \end{pmatrix} : t,u \in \mathbb F_q, t^2 - du^2=1 \right\} \subset \mathrm{SL}_2(\mathbb F_q) .$$

More generally, if $E/F$ is a finite field extension of degree $d$ then the Weil restriction from $E$ to $F$ of the multiplicative group of $E$ is an $F$-torus of rank $d$ and $F$-rank 1 (note that restriction of scalars over an inseparable field extension will yield a commutative algebraic group that is not a torus). The kernel $N_{E/F}$ of its field norm is also a torus, which is anisotropic and of rank $d-1$. Any $F$-torus of rank one is either split or isomorphic to the kernel of the norm of a quadratic extension. The two examples above are special cases of this: the compact real torus is the kernel of the field norm of $\mathbb C/\mathbb R$ and the anisotropic torus over $\mathbb F_q$ is the kernel of the field norm of $\mathbb F_{q^2} / \mathbb F_q$.

== Weights and coweights ==
Over a separably closed field, a torus T admits two primary invariants. The weight lattice $X^\bullet(T)$ is the group of algebraic homomorphisms T → G_{m}, and the coweight lattice $X_\bullet(T)$ is the group of algebraic homomorphisms G_{m} → T. These are both free abelian groups whose rank is that of the torus, and they have a canonical nondegenerate pairing $X^\bullet(T) \times X_\bullet(T) \to \mathbb{Z}$ given by $(f,g) \mapsto \deg(f \circ g)$, where degree is the number n such that the composition is equal to the nth power map on the multiplicative group. The functor given by taking weights is an antiequivalence of categories between tori and free abelian groups, and the coweight functor is an equivalence. In particular, maps of tori are characterized by linear transformations on weights or coweights, and the automorphism group of a torus is a general linear group over Z. The quasi-inverse of the weights functor is given by a dualization functor from free abelian groups to tori, defined by its functor of points as:

$$D(M)_S(X) := \mathrm{Hom}(M, \mathbb{G}_{m,S}(X)).$$

This equivalence can be generalized to pass between groups of multiplicative type (a distinguished class of formal groups) and arbitrary abelian groups, and such a generalization can be convenient if one wants to work in a well-behaved category, since the category of tori doesn't have kernels or filtered colimits.

When a field K is not separably closed, the weight and coweight lattices of a torus over K are defined as the respective lattices over the separable closure. This induces canonical continuous actions of the absolute Galois group of K on the lattices. The weights and coweights that are fixed by this action are precisely the maps that are defined over K. The functor of taking weights is an antiequivalence between the category of tori over K with algebraic homomorphisms and the category of finitely generated torsion free abelian groups with an action of the absolute Galois group of K.

Given a finite separable field extension L/K and a torus T over L, we have a Galois module isomorphism

$$X^\bullet(\mathrm{Res}_{L/K}T) \cong \mathrm{Ind}_{G_L}^{G_K} X^\bullet(T).$$

If T is the multiplicative group, then this gives the restriction of scalars a permutation module structure. Tori whose weight lattices are permutation modules for the Galois group are called quasi-split, and all quasi-split tori are finite products of restrictions of scalars.

== Tori in semisimple groups ==
=== Linear representations of tori ===
As seen in the examples above tori can be represented as linear groups. An alternative definition for tori is:

A linear algebraic group is a torus if and only if it is diagonalisable over an algebraic closure.

The torus is split over a field if and only if it is diagonalisable over this field.

=== Split rank of a semisimple group ===
If $\mathbf G$ is a semisimple algebraic group over a field $F$ then:

- its rank (or absolute rank) is the rank of a maximal torus subgroup in $\mathbf G$ (note that all maximal tori are conjugated over $F$ so the rank is well-defined);
- its $F$-rank (sometimes called $F$-split rank) is the maximal rank of a torus subgroup in $G$ which is split over $F$.

Obviously the rank is greater than or equal the $F$-rank; the group is called split if and only if equality holds (that is, there is a maximal torus in $\mathbf G$ which is split over $F$). The group is called anisotropic if it contains no split tori (i.e. its $F$-rank is zero).

=== Classification of semisimple groups ===
In the classical theory of semisimple Lie algebras over the complex field the Cartan subalgebras play a fundamental rôle in the classification via root systems and Dynkin diagrams. This classification is equivalent to that of connected algebraic groups over the complex field, and Cartan subalgebras correspond to maximal tori in these. In fact the classification carries over to the case of an arbitrary base field under the assumption that there exists a split maximal torus (which is automatically satisfied over an algebraically closed field). Without the splitness assumption things become much more complicated and a more detailed theory has to be developed, which is still based in part on the study of adjoint actions of tori.

If $\mathbf T$ is a maximal torus in a semisimple algebraic group $\mathbf G$ then over the algebraic closure it gives rise to a root system $\Phi$ in the vector space $V = X^*(\mathbf T) \otimes_{\mathbb Z} \mathbb R$. On the other hand, if ${}_F \mathbf T \subset \mathbf T$ is a maximal $F$-split torus its action on the $F$-Lie algebra of $\mathbf G$ gives rise to another root system ${}_F \Phi$. The restriction map $X^*(\mathbf T) \to X^*(_F\mathbf T)$ induces a map $\Phi \to {}_F\Phi \cup\{0\}$ and the Tits index is a way to encode the properties of this map and of the action of the Galois group of $\overline F / F$ on $\Phi$. The Tits index is a "relative" version of the "absolute" Dynkin diagram associated to $\Phi$; obviously, only finitely many Tits indices can correspond to a given Dynkin diagram.

Another invariant associated to the split torus ${}_F \mathbf T$ is the anisotropic kernel: this is the semisimple algebraic group obtained as the derived subgroup of the centraliser of ${}_F \mathbf T$ in $\mathbf G$ (the latter is only a reductive group). As its name indicates it is an anisotropic group, and its absolute type is uniquely determined by ${}_F \Phi$.

The first step towards a classification is then the following theorem

Two semisimple $F$-algebraic groups are isomorphic if and only if they have the same Tits indices and isomorphic anisotropic kernels.

This reduces the classification problem to anisotropic groups, and to determining which Tits indices can occur for a given Dynkin diagram. The latter problem has been solved in Tits (1966). The former is related to the Galois cohomology groups of $F$. More precisely to each Tits index there is associated a unique quasi-split group over $F$; then every $F$-group with the same index is an inner form of this quasi-split group, and those are classified by the Galois cohomology of $F$ with coefficients in the adjoint group.

== Tori and geometry ==
=== Flat subspaces and rank of symmetric spaces ===
If $G$ is a semisimple Lie group then its real rank is the $\mathbb R$-rank as defined above (for any $\mathbb R$-algebraic group whose group of real points is isomorphic to $G$), in other words the maximal $r$ such that there exists an embedding $(\mathbb R^\times)^r \to G$. For example, the real rank of $\mathrm{SL}_n(\mathbb R)$ is equal to $n-1$, and the real rank of $\mathrm{SO}(p,q)$ is equal to $\min(p,q)$.

If $X$ is the symmetric space associated to $G$ and $T \subset G$ is a maximal split torus then there exists a unique orbit of $T$ in $X$ which is a totally geodesic flat subspace in $X$. It is in fact a maximal flat subspace and all maximal such are obtained as orbits of split tori in this way. Thus there is a geometric definition of the real rank, as the maximal dimension of a flat subspace in $X$.

=== Q-rank of lattices ===
If the Lie group $G$ is obtained as the real points of an algebraic group $\mathbf G$ over the rational field $\mathbb Q$ then the $\mathbb Q$-rank of $\mathbf G$ has also a geometric significance. To get to it one has to introduce an arithmetic group $\Gamma$ associated to $\mathbf G$, which roughly is the group of integer points of $\mathbf G$, and the quotient space $M = \Gamma \backslash X$, which is a Riemannian orbifold and hence a metric space. Then any asymptotic cone of $M$ is homeomorphic to a finite simplicial complex with top-dimensional simplices of dimension equal to the $\mathbb Q$-rank of $\mathbf G$. In particular, $M$ is compact if and only if $\mathbf G$ is anisotropic.

Note that this allows to define the $\mathbf Q$-rank of any lattice in a semisimple Lie group, as the dimension of its asymptotic cone.

=== Buildings ===
If $\mathbf G$ is a semisimple group over $\mathbb Q_p$ the maximal split tori in $\mathbf G$ correspond to the apartments of the Bruhat-Tits building $X$ associated to $\mathbf G$. In particular the dimension of $X$ is equal to the $\mathbb Q_p$-rank of $\mathbf G$.

== Algebraic tori over an arbitrary base scheme ==
=== Definition ===
Given a base scheme S, an algebraic torus over S is defined to be a group scheme over S that is fpqc locally isomorphic to a finite product of copies of the multiplicative group scheme G_{m}/S over S. In other words, there exists a faithfully flat map X → S such that any point in X has a quasi-compact open neighborhood U whose image is an open affine subscheme of S, such that base change to U yields a finite product of copies of GL_{1,U} = G_{m}/U. One particularly important case is when S is the spectrum of a field K, making a torus over S an algebraic group whose extension to some finite separable extension L is a finite product of copies of G_{m}/L. In general, the multiplicity of this product (i.e., the dimension of the scheme) is called the rank of the torus, and it is a locally constant function on S.

Most notions defined for tori over fields carry to this more general setting.

==== Examples ====
One common example of an algebraic torus is to consider the affine cone $\text{Aff}(X) \subset \mathbb{A}^{n+1}$ of a projective scheme $X \subset \mathbb{P}^n$. Then, with the origin removed, the induced projection map
$$\pi: (\text{Aff}(X) - \{0\}) \to X$$
gives the structure of an algebraic torus over $X$.

=== Weights ===
For a general base scheme S, weights and coweights are defined as fpqc sheaves of free abelian groups on S. These provide representations of fundamental groupoids of the base with respect the fpqc topology. If the torus is locally trivializable with respect to a weaker topology such as the etale topology, then the sheaves of groups descend to the same topologies and these representations factor through the respective quotient groupoids. In particular, an etale sheaf gives rise to a quasi-isotrivial torus, and if S is locally noetherian and normal (more generally, geometrically unibranched), the torus is isotrivial. As a partial converse, a theorem of Grothendieck asserts that any torus of finite type is quasi-isotrivial, i.e., split by an etale surjection.

Given a rank n torus T over S, a twisted form is a torus over S for which there exists a fpqc covering of S for which their base extensions are isomorphic, i.e., it is a torus of the same rank. Isomorphism classes of twisted forms of a split torus are parametrized by nonabelian flat cohomology $H^1(S, GL_n(\mathbb{Z}))$, where the coefficient group forms a constant sheaf. In particular, twisted forms of a split torus T over a field K are parametrized by elements of the Galois cohomology pointed set $H^1(G_K, GL_n(\mathbb{Z}))$ with trivial Galois action on the coefficients. In the one-dimensional case, the coefficients form a group of order two, and isomorphism classes of twisted forms of G_{m} are in natural bijection with separable quadratic extensions of K.

Since taking a weight lattice is an equivalence of categories, short exact sequences of tori correspond to short exact sequences of the corresponding weight lattices. In particular, extensions of tori are classified by Ext^{1} sheaves. These are naturally isomorphic to the flat cohomology groups $H^1(S, \mathrm{Hom}_\mathbb{Z} (X^\bullet(T_1), X^\bullet(T_2)))$. Over a field, the extensions are parametrized by elements of the corresponding Galois cohomology group.

== Arithmetic invariants ==
In his work on Tamagawa numbers, T. Ono introduced a type of functorial invariants of tori over finite separable extensions of a chosen field k. Such an invariant is a collection of positive real-valued functions f_{K} on isomorphism classes of tori over K, as K runs over finite separable extensions of k, satisfying three properties:

1. Multiplicativity: Given two tori T_{1} and T_{2} over K, f_{K}(T_{1} × T_{2}) = f_{K}(T_{1}) f_{K}(T_{2})
2. Restriction: For a finite separable extension L/K, f_{L} evaluated on an L torus is equal to f_{K} evaluated on its restriction of scalars to K.
3. Projective triviality: If T is a torus over K whose weight lattice is a projective Galois module, then f_{K}(T) = 1.

T. Ono showed that the Tamagawa number of a torus over a number field is such an invariant. Furthermore, he showed that it is a quotient of two cohomological invariants, namely the order of the group $H^1(G_k, X^\bullet(T)) \cong Ext^1(T, \mathbb{G}_m)$ (sometimes mistakenly called the Picard group of T, although it doesn't classify G_{m} torsors over T), and the order of the Tate–Shafarevich group.

The notion of invariant given above generalizes naturally to tori over arbitrary base schemes, with functions taking values in more general rings. While the order of the extension group is a general invariant, the other two invariants above do not seem to have interesting analogues outside the realm of fraction fields of one-dimensional domains and their completions.

== See also ==
- Toric geometry
- Torus
- Torus based cryptography
- Hopf algebra
