= Mamidala Ramulu =

Rmechanical engineering professor at University of Washington

- Born: Tarigoppula, Jangaon district, Telangana, India
- Education: B.E, MTech, PhD in Mechanical Engineering
- Alma mater: Osmania University; IIT Delhi; University of Washington

Dr. Ramulu Mamidala (M. Ramulu) is a mechanical engineering professor at University of Washington. Usually goes by the name 'Ram', or 'M.R.', he is recognized for his leadership and outstanding record in promoting collaborative education and research with industry. He is currently the director of Manufacturing Science and Technology Laboratory (MSTL) at Mechanical Engineering Department, University of Washington. He has designed and developed manufacturing methods for a wide range of systems, from the B2 bomber to the Boeing 787. Additionally, in collaboration with industry, he established and directed two interdisciplinary graduate educational programs in engineering and management and a certificate program in composites tooling and manufacturing. His exemplary collaborative efforts motivated working engineers to pursue doctoral studies and he is a leader in using emerging technologies in distance education to reach non-traditional students.

Ramulu has been a faculty member in mechanical engineering, UW since 1982, and adjunct professor in Industrial & Systems Engineering and Materials Science & Engineering. He has been a devoted mentor, educator and researcher for over 35 years of his career at University of Washington. He established and directed two graduate educational programs and developed a certificate program in Composite Materials & Manufacturing that serves working aerospace engineers in collaboration with The Boeing Company.

He is a recipient of the NSF Presidential Young Investigator Award and the Technology Award from Waterjet Technology Association. He has published more than 500 technical papers in refereed journals and conference proceedings, edited five ASME Symposium Proceedings and co-edited a book, Machining of Ceramics and Composites. He is one of the founding members of Machining Science and Technology Journal and serves as a member of the editorial boards of five other scientific journals. He is a Fellow of ASME (American Society of Mechanical Engineers), ASM International(American Society for Metals), SEM (Society for Experimental Mechanics), SME (Society of Manufacturing Engineers).

He has supervised more than 250 graduate students, was awarded the Outstanding Teacher in the College of Engineering Award (1985–86) and was ranked among the top 10 professors at the University of Washington by graduating students in the TYEE yearbook (1986). He was awarded the ASM-IIM International Lectureship Award (1985–86), SAE's Ralph R. Teetor Educational Award (1987), ASEE's AT&T Foundation Award for Excellence in Instruction of Engineering Students (1989); and the Faculty Excellence Award from the Minority Science & Engineering Program (1991). His efforts to foster university—industry collaboration have been recognized with the "Academic Engineer of the Year" Award (1994) from the Puget Sound Engineering Council, Washington, and an Ed Wells Summer Faculty Fellowship from Boeing (1997). For his excellence in online teaching and innovation. he was awarded the 2004 R1.edu Award, and for his contributions to distance education, he won the 2012 Distinguished Contribution to Life-Long Learning Award.

== Education ==
Professor Ramulu received a B.E. in mechanical engineering with distinction from Osmania University, India; MTech in production engineering from the Indian Institute of Technology, Delhi. He completed his doctoral degree at University of Washington in 1982 under Dr. Kobayashi's guidance.

University of Washington, Seattle, WA
PhD in Mechanical Engineering
Date of Graduation: March 1982
Dissertation: Dynamic Crack Curving and Branching

Indian Institute of Technology, New Delhi, India
Master of Technology (MTech) in Production Engineering
Date of Graduation: June 1976
Thesis: Identification and Optimization of Cutting Process

Osmania University, Hyderabad, India
Bachelor of Engineering (BE) in Mechanical Engineering with Distinction
Date of Graduation: June 1974

== Teaching ==
He teaches 4-5 undergraduate/graduate courses every calendar year at the Mechanical Engineering Department at the University of Washington. These courses include mechanics of materials, fracture mechanics, fatigue, and advanced manufacturing processes.

== Research ==
Mamidala's research interests reflect the multi-disciplinary nature of materials, mechanics and manufacturing engineering, and primarily focuses on aircraft materials and structures. His research endeavors span from Fracture Mechanics, fatigue and manufacturing. At present, his primary focus is on advanced and unconventional manufacturing processes: Abrasive waterjet, Diffusion Bonding and Superplasticity, EDM (Electrical Discharge Machining) and Friction Stir Welding. His research has been supported by the National Science Foundation, the Air Force Office of Scientific Research, Boeing. GE Super Abrasives, Paccar, TRW, Flow International, Quest, Electroimpact, Kyocera, Pacific Northwest Labs, McDonnell Douglas, and the Puget Sound Naval Shipyard. He is an international expert on the machining and surface integrity of composite materials and structures.

== Publications ==
1. Edwards, P. D., & Ramulu, M. (2015). Material flow during friction stir welding of Ti-6Al-4V. Journal of Materials Processing Technology, 218, 107 115. doi:https://dx.doi.org/10.1016/j.jmatprotec.2014.11.046

2. Gangwar, K., Ramulu, M., Cantrell, A., & Sanders, D. G. (2016). Microstructure and Mechanical Properties of Friction Stir Welded Dissimilar Titanium Alloys: TIMET-54M and ATI-425. Metals, 6(10), 252.

3. Gururaja, S., Ramulu, M., & Pedersen, W. (2013). Machining of MMCs: a review. Machining Science and Technology, 17(1), 41–73.

4. Mohan, R., Ramulu, M., Kim, T. J., & Geskin, E. S. (1997). State of the art of research and development in abrasive waterjet machining.

5. Pahuja, R., Ramulu, M., & Hashish, M. (2016). Abrasive Waterjet Profile Cutting of Thick Titanium/Graphite Fiber Metal Laminate. Retrieved from https://dx.doi.org/10.1115/IMECE2016-67136

6. Ramulu, M., Branson, T., & Kim, D. (2001). A study on the drilling of composite and titanium stacks. Composite Structures, 54(1), 67–77. doi:10.1016/S0263-8223(01)00071-X

7. Ramulu, M., & Kobayashi, A. S. (1985). Mechanics of crack curving and branching—a dynamic fracture analysis. International Journal of Fracture, 27(3), 187–201.

8. Wang, D. H., Ramulu, M., & Arola, D. (1995). Orthogonal cutting mechanisms of graphite/epoxy composite. Part I: unidirectional laminate. International Journal of Machine Tools and Manufacture, 35(12), 1623–1638. doi:https://dx.doi.org/10.1016/0890-6955(95)00014-O

9. Pahuja, Rishi, and M. Ramulu. "Abrasive water jet machining of Titanium (Ti6Al4V)–CFRP stacks–A semi-analytical modeling approach in the prediction of kerf geometry" Journal of Manufacturing Processes 39 (2019): 327–337.

The full list of publications can be found at https://scholar.google.com/citations?user=ZAxgNpYAAAAJ&hl=en, http://depts.washington.edu/mstlab/publications/

== Past Students ==
Dr. Ramulu has successfully supervised over 250 Masters and PhD students so far. The PhD graduates under his supervision include:

Dr. D. H. Wang, 1993; Title: Machining Characteristics of Graphite/Epoxy Composites; Current: Professor, Department of Mechanical Engineering, Kyungnam University, Korea; http://mecha.kyungnam.ac.kr/prof/dhwang/

Dr. S.P. Raju, 1994; Title: Theoretical and Experimental Investigations into the Material Removal Process During Abrasive Waterjet Cutting; Current: The Bosch USA

Dr. C.W. Wern, 1995; Title: Fiber and Fiber-Matrix Interface Effects on the Orthogonal Cutting of Fiber Reinforced Plastics; Current: Associate Professor, Department of Mechanical Engineering, Portland State University, OR; http://www.me.pdx.edu/~wernc/

Dr. Dwayne Arola, 1996; Title: Abrasive Waterjet Manufacturing Effects on the Structural Integrity of Fiber-Reinforced Plastics; Current: Professor, Department of Materials Science & Engineering, University of Washington, Seattle, WA

Dr. Farzad Zafari, 1997; Title: Experimental and Numerical Investigation of Elastic-Plastic Mixed Mode Fracture in High Strength Aluminum Alloys; Current: Technical Fellow, Damage Tolerance, The Boeing Company

Dr. Zihong Guo, 1998; Title: Experimental and Numerical Investigation of Machining Damage in Structural Ceramics; Current: Director of Alliance Management, Intellectual Ventures, Bellevue, WA

Dr. Patrick Stickler, 2001; Title: Experimental and Numerical Investigation of Transversely Stitched T-joint.; Current: Founder and Chief Engineer of Cascade View Residential Structural Engineering, PLLC, Seattle.

Dr. Dave (Dae-wook) Kim, 2002; Title: Machining and Drilling Of Hybrid Composites; Current: Professor and Mechanical Engineering Program Coordinator, Washington State University, Vancouver, WA; https://labs.wsu.edu/dave-kim/

(Late) Dr. Kunaporn Sawalee, 2002; Title: An Experimental and Numerical Analysis of Waterjet Peening of 7075-T6 Aluminum Alloy; Formerly, Assistant Professor, Institute of Engineering and Resources Technology Walailuk, Thailand; Expired in August 2005

Dr. William Pedersen, 2003; Title: Machinability of Functionally Gradient Al/SiC Metal Matrix Composite; Current: Director of Engineering at Lake Superior Consulting, Duluth, Minnesota.

Dr. Franna Pitt, 2005; Title: Effect of Simulated Superplastic Forming Processing on the Mechanical Properties of Three Titanium Alloys; Retired, Formerly Associate Technical Fellow, The Boeing Company, Seattle

Dr. Suhasini Gururaja, 2008; Title: Analytical Modeling of Orthogonal Cutting of FRPs; Current: Associate Professor, Aerospace Engineering, Auburn University, AL

Dr. Dan Sanders, 2008; Title: – Development of Friction Stir Welding Combined with Superplastic Forming Processes for the Fabrication of Titanium Structures; Retired, Senior Technical Fellow, Boeing Research & Technology (BR&T), Metallic Materials & Processes, The Boeing Company, Seattle

Dr. Paul D. Edwards, 2010; Title: Friction Stir Welding of Ti-6Al-4V Sheet and Plate for Aerospace Structures; Current: Director, Materials Engineering, Tesla Motors, Pala Alto, CA

Dr. Timothy M. Briggs, 2010; Title: Rate Dependent and Low Velocity Impact Characterization of Composites; Current: Research Scientist, Sandia National Laboratories, CA

Dr. Alex M Chillman, 2010; Title: Energy-Based Modeling of Ultra High-Pressure Waterjet Surface Preparation Processes Including Milling, Peening, and Texturing Applications; Current: Director, Product Development, Fluke Materials, Seattle, WA.

Dr. Heechang Bae, 2011; Title: Experimental Study of Shot Peening Process and its Effects on High Cycle Fatigue in Aerospace Materials; Current: Assistant Professor, Mechanical Engineering & Mechanical Engineering Technology, Eastern Washington University, Cheney, WA

Dr. Julio Davis, 2012; Title: Analytical Modeling and Applications of Residual Stresses Induced by Shot Peening; Current: Stress Engineer, SMA, The Boeing Company, Everett, WA

Dr. Alex P O’Connor, 2013; Title: Machinability of Aerospace Tooling Materials For Composite Repairs; Current: The Boeing Company, Machining Technology R&D, Auburn, WA

Dr. Eshetu D Eneyew, 2014; Title: Experimental Study of Damage and Defect Detection during Drilling of CFRP Composites; Current: NDT Engineer, The Boeing Company, Charleston, SC; Adjunctive Professor of Physics, College of Charleston, Charleston, SC

Dr. Jeffery Miller, 2014; Title: Investigation of Machinability and Dust Emissions in Edge Trimming of Laminated Carbon Fiber Composites; Current: Senior Technical Fellow, The Boeing Company, Seattle

Dr. Neha Kulkarni, 2015; Title: Study the Mechanical Performance of Similar and Dissimilar Titanium Alloy Joints Formed by Diffusion Bonding and Friction Stir welding Processes; Current: Honeywell Aerospace, Redmond, WA

Dr. Todd W. Morton, 2015; Title: Solid State Joining of Dissimilar Titanium Alloys; Current: The Boeing Company, Seattle

Dr. Renuka Prabhakar, 2017; Title: Advancements In Process Development And Mechanical Properties Of Recycled Glass Building Materials Through Experimentation And Analytical Modeling; Current: President and CEO EnVitrum; Lecturer, Everett Community College, Everett, WA.

Dr. Kapil D. Gangwar, 2017; Title: Friction Stir Welding of Dissimilar Titanium Alloys: Mechanical and Metallurgical Characterization; Current: Assistant Professor, Oregon Institute of Technology, Klamath Falls, Oregon

Dr. Stefan Hovik, 2019; Project: Low Velocity Impact Damage Modeling and Simulation of Titanium-Graphite Composite Laminate; Current: The Boeing Company

Dr. Rishi Pahuja, 2018; Project: Machining of metal composite stacks and hybrid aerospace materials through milling and Abrasive Water Jet; Current: Caltech Optical Observatories, CA

Dr. Harinder. S. Oberoi, 2019; Project: Machined Surface Integrity Effects on the Strength Properties, Damage Evolution and Fatigue Strength of Composite Laminates; Current: 777-X Program, Manufacturing, The Boeing Company

Dr. Nishita Anandan, 2019; Project: Study of Machinability of Metal Matrix Composites and its Effect on Surface Integrity; Current: Post Doctoral Fellow in Materials Lab, Mechanical Engineering, University of Washington, WA.

Dr. Bryan Ferguson, 2020; Project: Modeling and Experimental Analysis of Superplastic Forming and Diffusion Bonding; Current: Research Scientist, Lawrence Livermore Laboratory, CA

Dr. Sean Ghods, 2021, Ph.D. in Material Science and Engineering (Co-advising with Prof D. Arola); Project: Origins of Variability in Electron Beam Powder Fusion of Ti6Al4V; Current: Reliability Engineer, Microsoft Corporation, WA

Dr. Sai Krovvidi, 2021; Project: Thermomechanical Modeling of the Percussive Riveting Process; Current: Structures Engineer, Textron Aviation Defense, Wichita, KS

Dr. Abdullah Alajmi, 2021; Project: Characterization and Modeling of the Leading Edge Erosion of Wind Turbine Blades due to Sand Particles Impingement; Current: Assistant Professor, Kuwait University, Kuwait City, Kuwait.

== Awards ==
Dr. Ramulu is a Presidential Young Investigator and a Fellow of the American Society of Mechanical Engineers (ASME), ASM International, Society for Experimental Mechanics (SEM) and recently (April, 2007), a Fellow of Society of Manufacturing Engineers (SME). He has been recognized as an outstanding teacher and mentor at the University of Washington. Dr. Ramulu, who has supervised more than 200 graduate students, was awarded the Outstanding Teacher in the College of Engineering Award (1985–86) and was ranked among the top 10 professors at the University of Washington by graduating students in the TYEE yearbook (1986). He was awarded the ASM-IIM International Lectureship Award (1985–86), SAE's Ralph R. Teetor Educational Award (1987), ASEE's AT&T Foundation Award for Excellence in Instruction of Engineering Students (1989); and the Faculty Excellence Award from the Minority Science & Engineering Program (1991). His efforts to foster university—industry collaboration have been recognized with the "Academic Engineer of the Year" Award (1994) from the Puget Sound Engineering Council, Washington, and an Ed Wells Summer Faculty Fellowship from Boeing (1997). For his excellence in online teaching and innovation. he was awarded the 2004 R1.edu Award, and for his contributions to distance education, he won the 2012 Distinguished Contribution to Life-Long Learning Award.He has also won the national youth award.
