= Rubin–Ford effect =

Apparent anisotropy in the expansion of the universe

The Rubin–Ford effect is, per Ian Ridpath's Dictionary of Astronomy, an apparent rather than actual "anisotropy in the expansion of the Universe on a scale of around 100 million [light years] as revealed by a study of the motions of a sample of spiral galaxies," as initially described by Vera Rubin, William Kent Ford Jr., and Norbert Thonnard of the Carnegie Institution of Washington, Morton S. Roberts of the National Radio Astronomy Observatory, and John A. Graham of the Cerro Tololo Inter-American Observatory, in La Serena, Chile. Specifically, their conclusion was that a sample of galaxies (referred to as ScI) was, on the whole, moving with a velocity of 885 km s^{−1} toward a specific astronomical position (l = 304°, b = 26°) relative to the microwave background radiation, which, because it is isotropic, provided a frame of reference for the measurement.

The description by Rubin and colleagues, first appearing in 1976, is considered pioneering work, and has been the subject of "intense discussion" since its first report. The effect, however, is now seen as being apparent, and the data from which it was derived "probably only reflect the inhomogeneous distribution of galaxies in the region of the Rubin–Ford sample"—i.e., that "the Universe is not homogeneous on these scales"—and are actually "consistent with isotropic expansion, an unperturbed galaxy velocity field and hence a low density Universe."

As indicated by the opening definition, and as described by Bernard J.T. Jones in review in 2002, the data on which the conclusion of an effect was based are:

indeed biased in the way described by Fall and Jones [1976] and the apparent large scale flow implied by that data is spurious… [The bias] arises only in samples of galaxies selected in a narrow range of absolute magnitudes, such as ScI galaxies and so one should be careful before arguing that such effects arise in other samples.
