= Judith Young (astronomer) =

American physicist (1952–2014)

- Born: Judith Sharn Rubin; September 15, 1952
- Died: May 23, 2014 (aged 61)
- Education: Harvard University; University of Minnesota
- Spouse: Michael Young (m. 1975–1990)
- Children: 1
- Parents: Robert Joshua Rubin (father); Vera Rubin (mother)
- Relatives: Karl Rubin (brother)
- Awards: Maria Goeppert-Mayer Award; Annie Jump Cannon Award in Astronomy (1982)
- Scientific career
- Fields: Astronomy
- Workplaces: University of Massachusetts Amherst
- Thesis: The Isotopic Composition of Cosmic Rays (1979)
- Doctoral advisor: Phyllis S. Freier

Judith Sharn Young (née Rubin; September 15, 1952 – May 23, 2014) was an American physicist, astronomer, and educator. The American Physical Society honored Young with the first Maria Goeppert-Mayer Award for being the best young physicist in the world in 1986. Astronomer Nick Scoville of Caltech writes of her research: "Her pioneering galactic structure research included some of the earliest mapping of CO emission in galaxies followed by the most extensive surveys [of] molecular gas and star formation in nearby galaxies."

== Career ==
Young received her Bachelor of Arts degree in Astronomy from Harvard University and graduated with Honors. She received her M.S. and Ph.D. in physics from the University of Minnesota.

Young began a postdoctoral fellowship at UMass in 1979, collaborating with Nick Z. Scoville in a study which measured the cold gas and carbon monoxide content of galaxies. The pair made the discovery that the distribution of light and gas is proportional in galaxies. The American Astronomical Society awarded her the Annie J. Cannon Prize for this work in 1982.

Young became an assistant professor at the University of Massachusetts Amherst in 1985. In 1989, Young was promoted to associate professor with tenure, and became a Full Professor in 1993. She published more than 130 papers, mentored 5 Ph.D. candidates, and supervised 15 undergraduate research projects.

Young is perhaps best known for her Sunwheel project. Young's goal for this project was to bring astronomy down to earth and to an empty lot behind the football stadium at the UMass-Amherst campus. In addition to her academic work, Young volunteered on the UMass campus and in her local community.

== Personal life ==
Young was born in Washington, D.C., the daughter of astronomer Vera Rubin and mathematical biophysicist Robert Joshua Rubin, and sister to mathematician Karl Rubin.

She was married to Michael Young from 1975 to 1990 and had a daughter, Laura.

Judith Young died from complications resulting from multiple myeloma, a disease she lived with for eight years.
