= Kenneth Balkus =

American Scientist

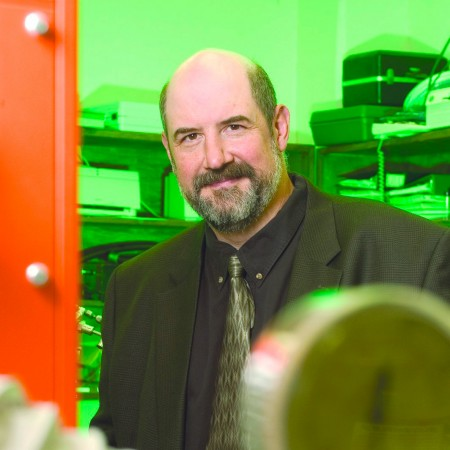
- Born: United States
- Education: Worcester Polytechnic Institute (BS); University of Florida (PhD)
- Scientific career
- Workplaces: The University of Texas at Dallas
- Doctoral advisor: Russell S. Drago
- Website: labs.utdallas.edu/balkus

Kenneth J. Balkus, Jr. is an American chemist and materials scientist. He is professor of chemistry and former department chair at The University of Texas at Dallas. He is a Fellow of the American Chemical Society and a recipient of the ACS Doherty Award. His well known work is synthesis of zeolite UTD-1, the first high-silica zeolite to contain a one-dimensional, extra-large 14-ring pore system. Other notable work include rare-earth metal organic frameworks. He is editor to Journal of Porous Materials, Springer. He is also co-founder of DB Therapeutics, a company developing cancer therapies.

== Early life and education ==
Kenneth received his B.S., in chemistry from Worcester Polytechnic Institute, with distinction. He then moved to University of Florida for PhD in inorganic chemistry, where he worked with Russell S. Drago.

== Career ==
Balkus joined University of Pennsylvania as postdoctoral associate in 1986 with Bradford B. Wayland. He joined The University of Texas at Dallas in 1988 where he is currently professor of chemistry and professor of materials science and engineering and leading chemistry department.

== Research ==
Most of the research in his lab involves nanoporous metal oxides which include zeolites and related molecular sieves as well as hybrid frameworks.

- Synthesis and Characterization Novel microporous and mesoporous Materials
- Molecular Sieve/Polymer Composite Membranes
- Nanoparticles, Nanotubes and Quantum Dots for Photoconversion Processes
- Nanotube/Nanowire films for Energy Storage
- Molecular Sieve Immobilized Enzymes
- Drug Delivery, Wound Healing and Theranostics
- Electrospinning of NanFibers and Composites
- Molecular Sieve Based Optical and Electronic Chemical Sensors

== Awards and honours ==
- 2012 US Presidential Scholar Teacher Award
- 2011 ACS Fellow
- 2008 ACS Doherty Award
- 2008 Taiwan Chemistry Research Promotion Center Lectureship
- 1998 UOP Distinguished Lecturer
- 1991-1996 NSF Presidential Young Investigator Award
- 1986 ACS Florida Section Speaker Award
- 1986 ACS Sherwin-Williams Award - Finalist
