= Journal of Turbulence =

Scientific journal

- Discipline: Turbulence
- Language: English
- Edited by: Ugo Piomelli

Publication details
- History: 2000—present
- Publisher: Taylor & Francis
- Frequency: 7/year
- Impact factor: 1.6 (2024)

Standard abbreviations
- ISO 4: J. Turbul.

Indexing
- ISSN: 1468-5248

Links
- Journal homepage; Online access; Online archive

Journal of Turbulence is a peer-reviewed scientific journal published by Taylor & Francis. Established in 2000, it covers theoretical, numerical and experimental research in turbulence, including but not limited to turbulence modeling and geophysical fluid dynamics. Its current editor-in-chief is Ugo Piomelli (Queen's University at Kingston).

== Abstracting and indexing ==
The journal is abstracted and indexed in:

- Current Contents/Engineering, Computing & Technology
- Current Contents/Physical, Chemical & Earth Sciences
- EBSCO databases
- GEOBASE
- Inspec
- Science Citation Index Expanded
- Scopus
- zbMATH Open

According to the Journal Citation Reports, the journal has a 2024 impact factor of 1.6.
