= James W. LaBelle =

American astrophysicist (born 1958)

James W. LaBelle (born June 21, 1958 in Denver, Colorado) is an American physicist. He received his B.S. from Stanford University in 1980, his M.S. from Cornell University in 1982 and his Ph.D. from Cornell in 1985. He is currently professor and former department chair in the Department of Physics and Astronomy at Dartmouth College in Hanover, New Hampshire and has been a professor there since 1989. Since 2010, he has held the Lois L. Rodgers Professorship.

LaBelle's primary field of study is ionosphere and magnetosphere plasma physics. He was awarded a McMullen Fellowship for Graduate Study in 1980-1981, a Presidential Young Investigator Award in 1990-1995, and a Dartmouth Junior Faculty Fellowship in the spring of 1993.
