= Michael Steer =

American engineering academic (born 1955)

Michael B. Steer (born 1955 in Queensland, Australia) is a Lampe professor of electrical and computer engineering at North Carolina State University and one of the leading electrical engineers in today's analog/RF and microwave world. He has published numerous articles in the "IEEE Microwave and Antennas" journal, along with leading the NCSU Dinosauria project. He is credited with being the first IEEE Fellow to fine-tune all of his constitutive relations and as a result, creating a paperless office.

== Publications ==
1. G. J. Mazzaro, M. B. Steer, and K. G. Gard, “Response of RF Networks to Transient Waveforms: Interference in Frequency-Hopped Communications,” IEEE Transactions on Microwave Theory & Techniques, Vol. 56, No. 12, pp. 2808–2814, December 2008.
2. F. Hart, S. Luniya, J. Nath, A. Victor and M. B. Steer, “Modeling high-order filters in a transient microwave circuit simulator,” IET Microwaves, Antennas & Propagation, Vol. 1, No. 5, October 2007, pp. 1024–1028.
3. N. M. Kriplani, S. Bowyer, J. Huckaby and M. B. Steer, “Modeling a tunnel diode in a circuit simulator,” submitted to IET Circuits, Devices & Systems, April 2007.
4. W. Fathelbab and M. B. Steer, “Parallel-coupled and hairpin filters with enhanced stopband performance,” submitted to the Int. Journal of Circuit Theory and Applications, April 2007.
5. S. Melamed, S. Luniya, L. E. Doxsee Jr., K. Obermiller, C. Hawkinson, W. R. Davis, P. D. Franzon and M. B. Steer, “Thermal analysis and verification of a mounted monolithic integrated circuit,” IEEE Trans. Advanced Packaging, submitted March 2007.
6. W. Fathelbab and M. B. Steer, “Filter prototypes comprising singlet and/or inline sections,” Int. Journal of Electronics, In Press .
7. D. Ghosh, B. J. Laughlin, J. Nath, A. I. Kingon, M. B. Steer and J-P. Maria, “Tunable high Q interdigitated (Ba, Sr)TiO3 capacitors fabricated on low cost substrates with copper metallization,” Thin Solid Films, Vol. 496, Iss. 2, February 21, 2006, pp. 669–673.
8. J. Nath, D. Ghosh, J.-P. Maria, A. I. Kingon, W. Fathelbab, P. D. Franzon and M. B. Steer, “An electronically-tunable microstrip bandpass filter using thin-film Barium Strontium Titanate (BST) varactors,” IEEE Trans. Microwave Theory and Tech., Vol. 53, No. 9, September 2005, pp. 2707–2712.
