= Robert L. Last =

Robert L. "Rob" Last
- Awards: Charles Reid Barnes Life Membership Award, American Society of Plant Biologists; University Distinguished Professor and Barnett Rosenberg Chair, Michigan State University; University Distinguished Faculty, Michigan State University; Postdoctoral Mentoring Award, College of Natural Sciences, Michigan State University; Fellow of the American Association for the Advancement of Science; Fellow of American Society of Plant Biologists; NSF Presidential Young Investigator Award
- Scientific career
- Workplaces: Ohio Wesleyan University; Carnegie-Mellon University; Whitehead Institute for Biomedical Research; Cornell University; Michigan State University
- Thesis: Characterization of RNA splicing components of the Baker's Yeast Saccharomyces cerevisiae (1986)
- Doctoral advisor: John L. Woolford
- Website: bmb.natsci.msu.edu/faculty/robert-l-last/

Robert L. Last is a plant biochemical genomicist who studies metabolic processes that protect plants from the environment and produce products important for animal and human nutrition. His research has covered (1) production and breakdown of essential amino acids, (2) the synthesis and protective roles of Vitamin C (ascorbic acid) and Vitamin E (tocopherols) as well as identification of mechanisms that protect photosystem II from damage, and (3) synthesis and biological functions of plant protective specialized metabolites (plant secondary metabolites). Four central questions are: (i) how are leaf and seed amino acids levels regulated, (ii.) what mechanisms protect and repair photosystem II from stress-induced damage, (iii.) how do plants produce protective metabolites in their glandular secreting trichomes (iv.) and what are the evolutionary mechanisms that contribute to the tremendous diversity of specialized metabolites that protect plants from insects and pathogens and are used as therapeutic agents.

== Education and training ==
Last obtained a BA in chemistry with a minor in biology in 1980 from Ohio Wesleyan University. He received his PhD in 1986 from Carnegie-Mellon University for research conducted in the Biological Sciences Department. His thesis research on the RNA genes of the Baker's yeast Saccharomyces cerevisiae was carried out under the direction of Professor John Woolford.

== Professional experience ==
Last spent three years as an NSF Plant Biology Postdoctoral Fellow at the Whitehead Institute for Biomedical Research working with Professor Gerald R. Fink. Starting in 1989 he worked through the ranks to Scientist at the Boyce Thompson Institute for Plant Research, and Adjunct Professor of Genetics and Development at Cornell University. Starting in 1998, he worked for four years at Cereon Genomics in Cambridge, MA as a founding science director. A highlight of this work was shotgun sequencing of the Arabidopsis thaliana Landsberg erecta genome. He served for 1.5 years as a program officer in the US National Science Foundation Plant Genome Research Program before moving to Michigan State University, where he is Barnett Rosenberg Chair, with appointments in the Departments of Plant Biology and Biochemistry and Molecular Biology. During this time he established the MSU Plant Genomics Research Experiences for Undergraduates Summer Training Program (in 2006) and serves as founding Program Director of the NIH-funded Plant Biotechnology for Health and Sustainability graduate training program. He has had sabbatical appointments at the Max Planck Institute for Chemical Ecology and the Weizmann Institute of Science.

Last was elected as president-elect of the American Society of Plant Biologists in 2017, with service as president in 2018–2019 and past president in 2019–2020. He served in a variety of editorial roles, including as a founding associate editor of Science Advances, associate and monitoring editor of Plant Physiology and editor-in-chief of The Arabidopsis Book. He was chair of the board of directors of the iPlant Collaborative (now CyVerse) during its first three years.

== Research ==
Last studies how plants produce metabolites that are important for their survival in the environment and either are essential for human health or contribute to the well-being of humans and other primary consumers of plants. His research integrates genetics, genomics, analytical chemistry, biochemistry and evolutionary biology to identify and characterize the proteins that perform these functions. Significant accomplishments related to primary metabolism in plants include identification of the first genetically-transmitted amino acid requiring mutants of plants leading to characterization of the tryptophan biosynthetic pathway, branched chain amino acid metabolic networks, and molecular genetic dissection of the Vitamins C and E biosynthetic pathways. Notable accomplishments related to plant environmental adaptation include characterization of plant UV-B sensing, protective and repair mechanisms, PSII protection and repair, and detailed analysis of the biosynthetic and evolutionary mechanisms that contribute to metabolic diversity in glandular secreting trichomes of cultivated tomato (Solanum lycopersicum) and its relatives in the Solanaceae (nightshade) family.
