= Inner form =

In mathematics, an inner form of an algebraic group $G$ over a field $K$ is another algebraic group $H$ such that there exists an isomorphism $\phi$ between $G$ and $H$ defined over $\overline K$ (this means that $H$ is a $K$-form of $G$) and in addition, for every Galois automorphism $\sigma \in \mathrm{Gal}(\overline K/K)$ the automorphism $\phi^{-1} \circ \phi^{\sigma}$ is an inner automorphism of $G(\overline K)$ (i.e. conjugation by an element of $G(\overline K)$).

Through the correspondence between $K$-forms and the Galois cohomology $H^1(\mathrm{Gal}(\overline K/K), \mathrm{Aut}(G))$ this means that $H$ is associated to an element of the subset $H^1(\mathrm{Gal}(\overline K/K), \mathrm{Inn}(G))$ where $\mathrm{Inn}(G)$ is the subgroup of inner automorphisms of $G$.

Being inner forms of each other is an equivalence relation on the set of $K$-forms of a given algebraic group.

A form which is not inner is called an outer form. In practice, to check whether a group is an inner or outer form one looks at the action of the Galois group $\mathrm{Gal}(\overline K/K)$ on the Dynkin diagram of $G$ (induced by its action on $G(\overline K)$, which preserves any torus and hence acts on the roots). Two groups are inner forms of each other if and only if the actions they define are the same.

For example, the $\mathbb R$-forms of $\mathrm{SL}_3(\mathbb R)$ are itself and the unitary groups $\mathrm{SU}(2,1)$ and $\mathrm{SU}(3)$. The latter two are outer forms of $\mathrm{SL}_3(\mathbb R)$, and they are inner forms of each other.
