= Joel H. Ferziger =

American engineer

Joel Henry Ferziger (24 March 1937 – 16 August 2004) was a professor emeritus of mechanical engineering at the Stanford University, Palo Alto, California, United States. Ferziger was an internationally recognized authority in fluid mechanics. His main area of research was computational fluid dynamics. He was known for developing computer simulations to model complex turbulent flows.

Along with Milovan Peric, he is the coauthor of a widely cited book on computational fluid dynamics titled Computational Methods for Fluid Dynamics.

Ferziger received his bachelor's degree in chemical engineering from the Cooper Union in New York in 1957. He received his master's (1959) and Ph.D. (1962) degrees in nuclear engineering, both from the University of Michigan. Ferziger started his academic career as an assistant professor of mechanical engineering at Stanford University in 1961 and was named full professor in 1972. He also held a courtesy professorship in the Department of Civil and Environmental Engineering.

Following his death, Ferziger's wife and daughters established the Professor Joel H. Ferziger Memorial Fellowship, awarded annually to a graduate student in Stanford's Mechanical Engineering Department. The first fellowship was awarded to Shashank, a student in the Flow Physics and Computational Engineering Group.

== Books authored ==
- Ferziger, J. H. and Kaper, H. G., Mathematical theory of transport processes in gases, North-Holland (1972). Out of print.
- Ferziger, J. H., Numerical Methods for Engineering Applications, 2nd ed., Wiley-Interscience (1998). ISBN 978-0-471-11621-9.
- Ferziger, J. H. and Peric, M., Computational Methods for Fluid Dynamics, 2nd ed., Springer-Verlag (2001). ISBN 978-3-540-42074-3.
