= Karl Rubin =

American mathematician (born 1956)

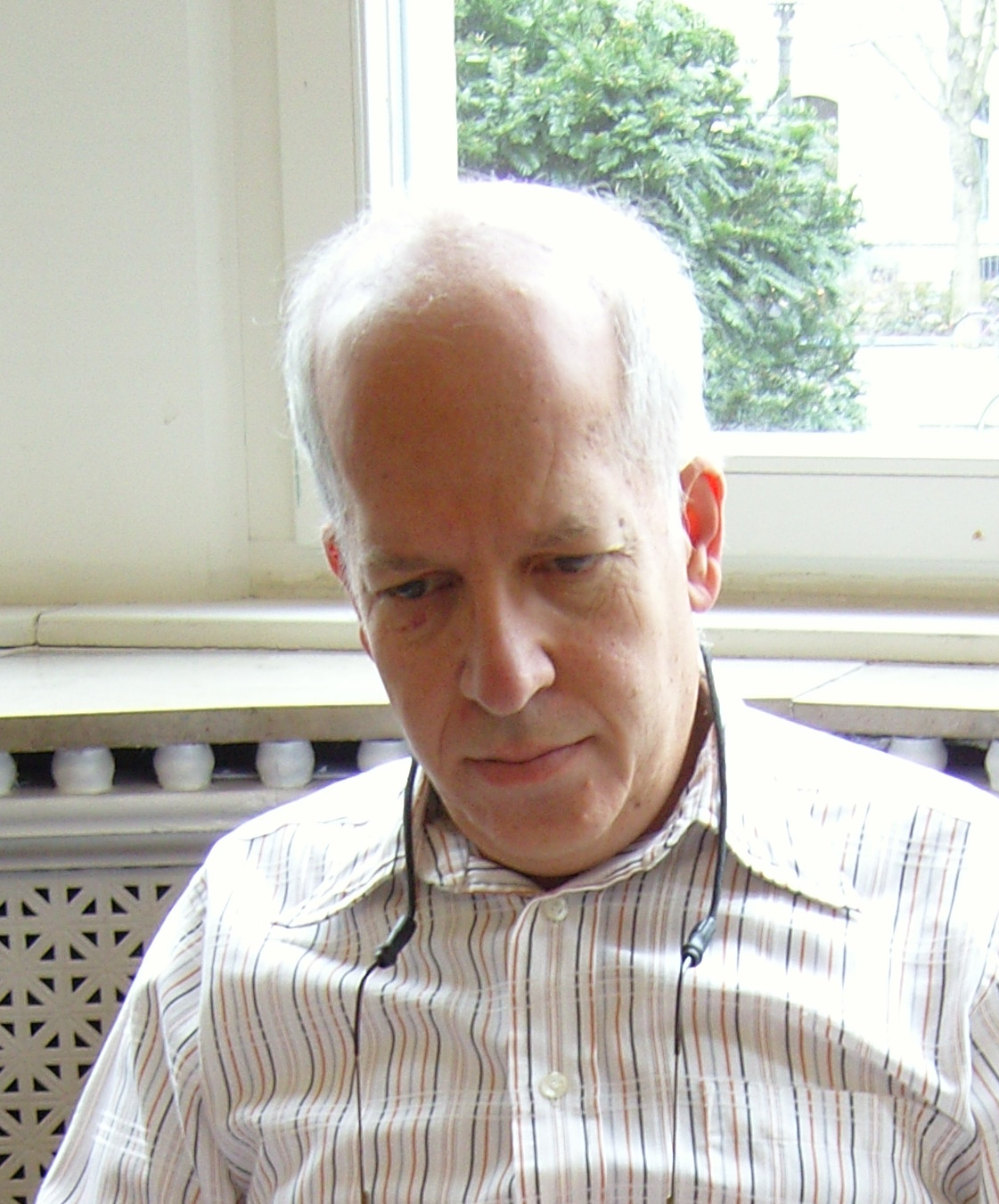
- Rubin in 2009
- Born: January 27, 1956 (age 70); Urbana, Illinois, US
- Education: Princeton University; Harvard University
- Awards: Cole Prize (1992)
- Scientific career
- Workplaces: Princeton University; Ohio State University; Columbia University; Stanford University; University of California, Irvine
- Doctoral advisor: Andrew Wiles
- Doctoral students: Cristian Dumitru Popescu

Karl Cooper Rubin (born January 27, 1956) is an American mathematician at University of California, Irvine as Thorp Professor of Mathematics. Between 1997 and 2006, he was a professor at Stanford, and before that worked at Ohio State University between 1987 and 1999. His research interest is in elliptic curves. He was the first mathematician (1986) to show that some elliptic curves over the rationals have finite Tate–Shafarevich groups. It is widely believed that these groups are always finite.

== Education and career ==
Rubin graduated from Princeton University in 1976, and obtained his Ph.D. from Harvard in 1981. His thesis advisor was Andrew Wiles. He was a Putnam Fellow in 1974, and a Sloan Research Fellow in 1985.

In 1988, Rubin received a National Science Foundation Presidential Young Investigator award, and in 1992 won the American Mathematical Society Cole Prize in number theory. In 2012 he became a fellow of the American Mathematical Society. Rubin's parents were mathematician Robert Joshua Rubin and astronomer Vera Rubin. Rubin is brother to astronomer and physicist Judith Young.

== See also ==
- CEILIDH
- Torus-based cryptography
- Euler system
- Stark conjectures
