= Rubens (disambiguation) =

Peter Paul Rubens (1577–1640) was a Flemish artist from the Rubens family.

Rubens may also refer to:

- Rubens (surname), including a list of people with the name
- Rubens (given name), including a list of people with the name
- Rubens (film), a 1977 Belgian film
- Rubens (horse), a 19th-century Thoroughbred racehorse
- Rubens (train), a Paris-Brussels express train 1974–1995
- Rubens, Iowa, US, a ghost town
- 10151 Rubens, a main-belt asteroid
- Rubens apple, an apple cultivar
- The Rubens, an Australian alternative rock band
  - The Rubens (album), 2012

== See also ==
- Reubens (disambiguation)
- Ruben (disambiguation)
- Reuben, and variant Reuben, a given name
- Ruben (surname)
- Rubin, a surname and given name
