= Reubens =

Reubens may refer to:

- a misspelling of Rubens (Peter Paul Rubens, 1577–1640), Flemish artist
- Paul Reubens (1952–2023), American comedian
- Reubens, Idaho, a city in United States
- Reuben's Restaurant, a restaurant and deli in Manhattan, New York City, United States

== See also ==
- Reuben (disambiguation)
- Rubens (disambiguation)
