= Rubin =

Rubin is both a surname and a given name. Rubins is a Latvian-language name. It derives from the biblical name Reuben as a Jewish name. The choice is also influenced by the word rubin meaning "ruby," in some languages.

Notable people with the name include:

== Given name ==
- Rubin Carter (1937–2014), nicknamed "The Hurricane," American boxer who was imprisoned and later absolved
- Rubin Goldmark (1872–1936), American composer, pianist and educator
- Rubin Kantorovich, candidate in the 1997 Canadian federal election
- Rubin Patiția (1841–1918), Austro-Hungarian ethnic Romanian lawyer and political activist

== Surname ==
- Rubin (surname)
- Rubins (surname)

== See also ==
- Ruben (surname), a list of people
- Rabin
- Reuben (disambiguation)
- Rubina
- Rubini
- Rubino
