= Ruben (surname) =

Ruben is a surname. Notable people with the surname include:

- Aarne Ruben (born 1971), Estonian writer
- Aaron Ruben (1914–2010), American television director and producer
- Adam Ruben (born 1979), American science communicator
- Alessandro Ruben (born 1966), Italian politician
- Abraham Anghik Ruben (born 1951), Inuvialuk Canadian sculptor
- Brad Ruben, American poker player
- Brent David Ruben (born 1944), American academic
- Christian Ruben (1805–1875), German painter
- David-Hillel Ruben (born 1943), American philosopher
- Ida G. Ruben (1929–2024), American politician from Maryland
- Ivan Ruben (1917–1986), Danish fencer
- J. Walter Ruben (1899–1942), American screenwriter
- John Ruben, American paleontologist
- José Ruben (1884–1969), French-American actor
- Joseph Ruben (born 1950), American filmmaker
- Josh Ruben (born 1983), American actor and director
- Karl Ruben (1903–1938), Danish chess player
- Leonard Ruben ((1925–2007), American lawyer and judge from Maryland, husband of Ida G. Ruben
- Ruben (film editor), Livingston Antony Ruben; Indian film editor
- Manuela Ruben (born 1964), German figure skater
- Marco Ruben (born 1986), Argentine footballer
- Mario Ruben (born 1968), German chemist
- Sam Ruben (1913–1943), American chemist
- Samuel Ruben (1900–1988), American chemist and battery inventor
- Walter Ruben (Indologist) (1899–1982), German Indologist

== See also ==
- Carlos Rubén (born 1983), Spanish footballer
- Spookey Ruben (Alan F. Deil; born 1972), Canadian musician and filmmaker
- Rubens (surname)
- Reuben#Surname
- Rubin, a surname and given name
