= Rubens (surname) =

Rubens is a Germanic, (in particular, Dutch, English, Yiddish, and German) patronymic surname derived from the given name spelled "Ruben" (of multiple origins) or its variations. Notable people with the surname include:

- Albert Rubens (1614–1657), Flemish philologist and numismatist, son of Peter Paul Rubens
- Alex Rubens (born 1978), American television writer
- Alexander Rubens, Lord of Vremdyck (died 1752), Flemish nobleman, grandson of Peter Paul Rubens
- Alma Rubens (1897–1931), American actress
- Annemarie Rübens (1900–1991), German Lutheran theologian and activist
- Anup Rubens (born 1983), Indian film music composer
- Arnold Frans Rubens (1687–1719), Southern Netherlandish painter
- Bernice Rubens (1923–2004), Welsh novelist
- Diana Rubens, American Veterans Affairs official
- Eugène Rubens-Alcais (1884–1963), French deaf activist
- Gerardus Rubens (1674–1736), Belgian abbot
- Harold Rubens (1918–2010), Welsh pianist and activist
- Heinrich Rubens (1865–1922), German experimental physicist
- Hélio Rubens (born 1940), Brazilian basketball player and coach
- Jan Rubens (1530–1587), Flemish lawyer and administrator of Antwerp, father of Peter Paul Rubens
- Jeff Rubens (born 1941), American contract bridge player and writer
- Jim Rubens, American politician from New Hampshire
- Larry Rubens (born 1959), American football player
- Mary Beth Rubens, Canadian actress
- Michael Rubens, American comedian and author
- Nicolaas Rubens, Lord of Rameyen (1618–1655), Flemish nobleman, son of Peter Paul Rubens
- Paul Rubens (1875–1917), English songwriter and librettist
- Percival Rubens (1928–2009), South African film director, screenwriter and producer
- Peter Paul Rubens (1577–1640), Flemish artist and diplomat
- Philip Rubens (1574–1611), Flemish antiquarian and philologist, brother of Peter Paul Rubens
- Shona Rubens (born 1986), Canadian alpine skier
- Sibylla Rubens (born 1967), German soprano
- Xavier Rubens (born 2005), Australian rugby union footballer

== See also ==
- Rubens family, related to Peter Paul Rubens
- Rubens (given name)
- Ruben (surname)
- Rubenis
- Paul Reubens (1952–2023), American actor and comedian
- Rubins (surname)
