= Rubino =

Rubino is a family name of Italian origin. Notable people with the surname include:

- Anthony Rubino (1921-1983), American football player
- Antonio Rubino, Italian illustrator and cartoonist
- Beth Rubino, American film art director
- Bonaventura Rubino, Italian composer
- Eduardo Rubiño, Spanish politician
- Gennaro Rubino, Italian anarchist
- Giorgio Rubino (born 1986), Italian racewalker
- Guy Rubino, Canadian chef
- Peter Rubino (born 1947), American sculptor
- Raffaele Rubino (born 1978), Italian footballer
- Ralph Rubino, American saxophone player
- Renzo Rubino, Italian singer

== See also ==
- Rubino, Ivory Coast
- Rubino di Cantavenna
- Luis Rubiños
- Rubini
- Rubio (disambiguation)
