= Reuben (disambiguation) =

Reubenis a given name and surname.

Reuben may also refer to:

== Arts and entertainment ==
- Reuben (band), a British rock band
- Reuben (novel), by John Edgar Wideman
- Reuben Awards, presented by the National Cartoonists Society

== Other uses ==
- Reuben sandwich, an American hot sandwich
- Reuben College, Oxford, England
- Reuben Township, Harlan County, Nebraska, United States
- Operation Ruben, a 2015 police operation that targeted suspected radical Islamists in the Republika Srpska, part of Bosnia and Herzegovina
- Tribe of Reuben, an ancient tribe of Israel

== See also ==
- Reubens (disambiguation)
- Reuben's Restaurant, in Manhattan, New York City
- Rubens (disambiguation)
- Rubin (disambiguation)
