= Jennifer Rubin =

Jennifer Rubin is the name of:

- Jennifer Rubin (actress) (born 1962), American actress and model
- Jennifer Rubin (columnist) (born 1962), American columnist and blogger for The Washington Post
- Jennifer Rubin (policy analyst), UK academic

== See also ==
- Rubin (disambiguation)
