= Moetzet Chachmei HaTorah =

Rabbinical body for Shas political party

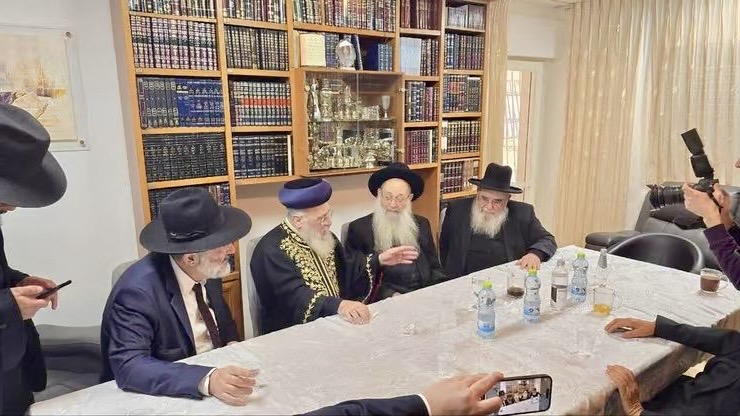
Moetzes Chachmei HaTorah members present; from l-r: Yitzchak Yosef; Moshe Maya; Avraham Salim; Shlomo Machpud (not present: Reuven Elbaz; Shmuel Betzalel)

Moetzet Chachmei HaTorah (Hebrew: מועצת חכמי התורה; lit., "Council of [wise] Torah Sages") is the rabbinical body that has the ultimate authority in the Israeli ultra-Orthodox Sephardic and Mizrahi Shas Party.

== History ==
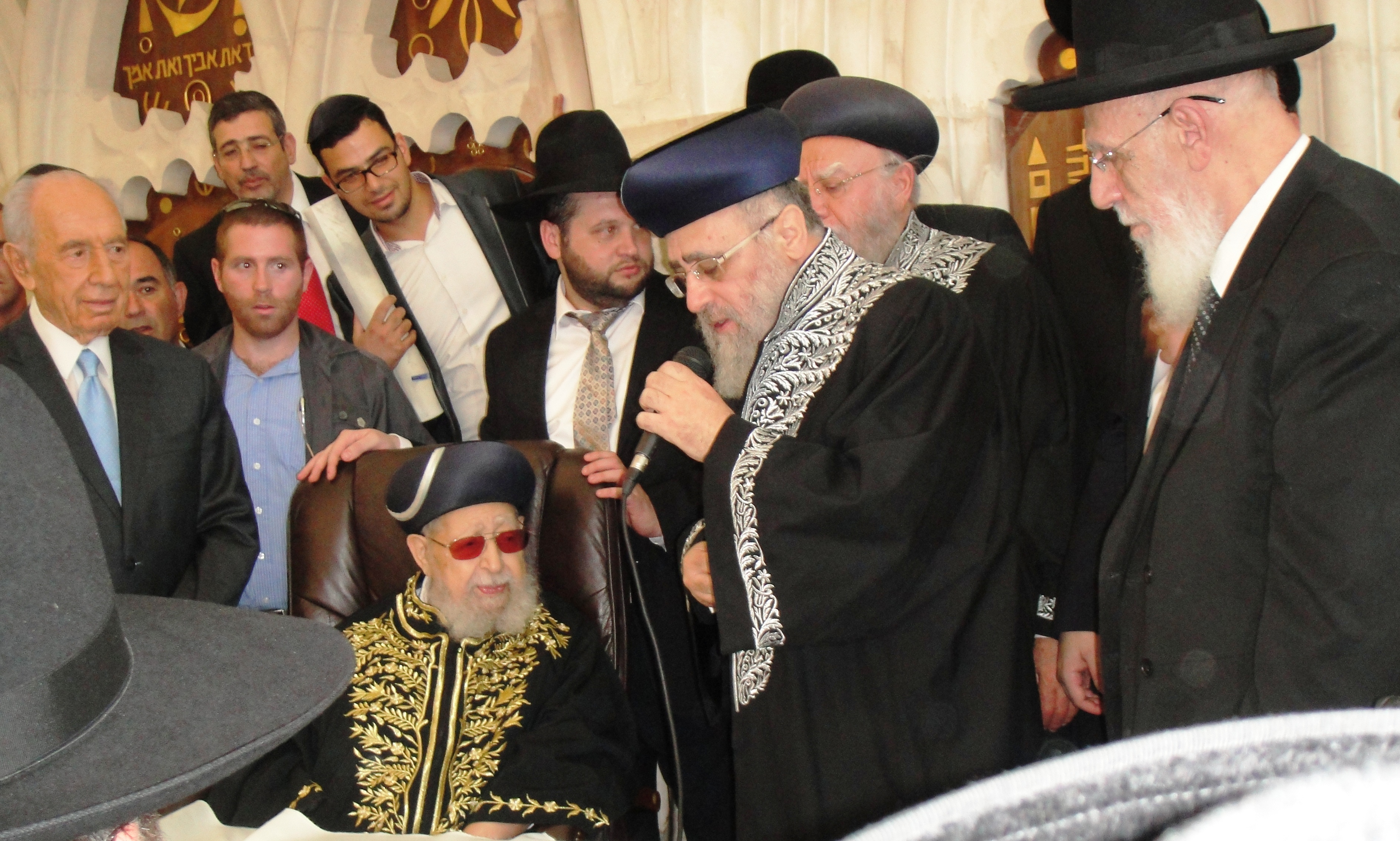
Rabbi Ovadia Yosef is seated, with his son Rabbi Yitzchak Yosef to his right, Rabbi Shalom Cohen at the far right, and Rabbi Eliyahu Bakshi-Doron in the back. Shimon Peres stands at the far left.

The council was established along with the establishment of Shas in 1982, in order to serve as the spiritual leadership of the new movement. As a new Haredi party, Shas followed in the footsteps of the Ashkenazi Agudat Yisrael and Moetzes Gedolei HaTorah, and set up a similar mechanism. Upon its establishment, the council became a new spiritual Sephardic-leadership in Israel; however, it also enjoyed the leadership of the Ashkenazi Torah sages council, especially the support of Rabbi Elazar Shach - a support that has stopped along with the independent decision of the council in 1990 that Shas would join the coalition government with the left (The dirty trick).

The members of the council decide on the list of candidates, coalition agreements, and determine the political and diplomatic policies of Shas as a party.

Founder members of the council were Sephardi Chief Rabbi of Israel Ovadia Yosef, Rabbi Shimon Baadani, Rabbi Shalom Cohen, and Rabbi Shabtai Aton (whom, following the cessation of support of the Ashkenazi Torah sages, retired in 1990). The first secretary of the council was Rabbi Yechezkel Aschayek, a confidant of Rabbi Shach. Initially, the council was founded in order to ensure the remote control of Rabbi Shach over the Shas movement, and to ensure his position as the ultimate arbiter over fateful questions facing the Shas movement. Because of this, the rabbis Baadani, Toledano, and Aton were appointed to the council, whom all studied under Rabbi Shach over the years. Rabbi Shalom Cohen is also considered a loyalist of Rabbi Shach. After Yechezkel Aschayek retired from Shas, he was replaced by Rabbi Moshe Maya (who later became a Knesset member, and eventually became himself a member of the Council). Rabbi Ovadia Yosef served as president of the council, for 30 years. After Moshe Maya, Rafael Pinhasi served as council secretary for 14 years, and had retired after the death of Rabbi Ovadia Yosef. Upon the death of his father, Rabbi Ovadia Yosef, David Yosef was appointed to the council.

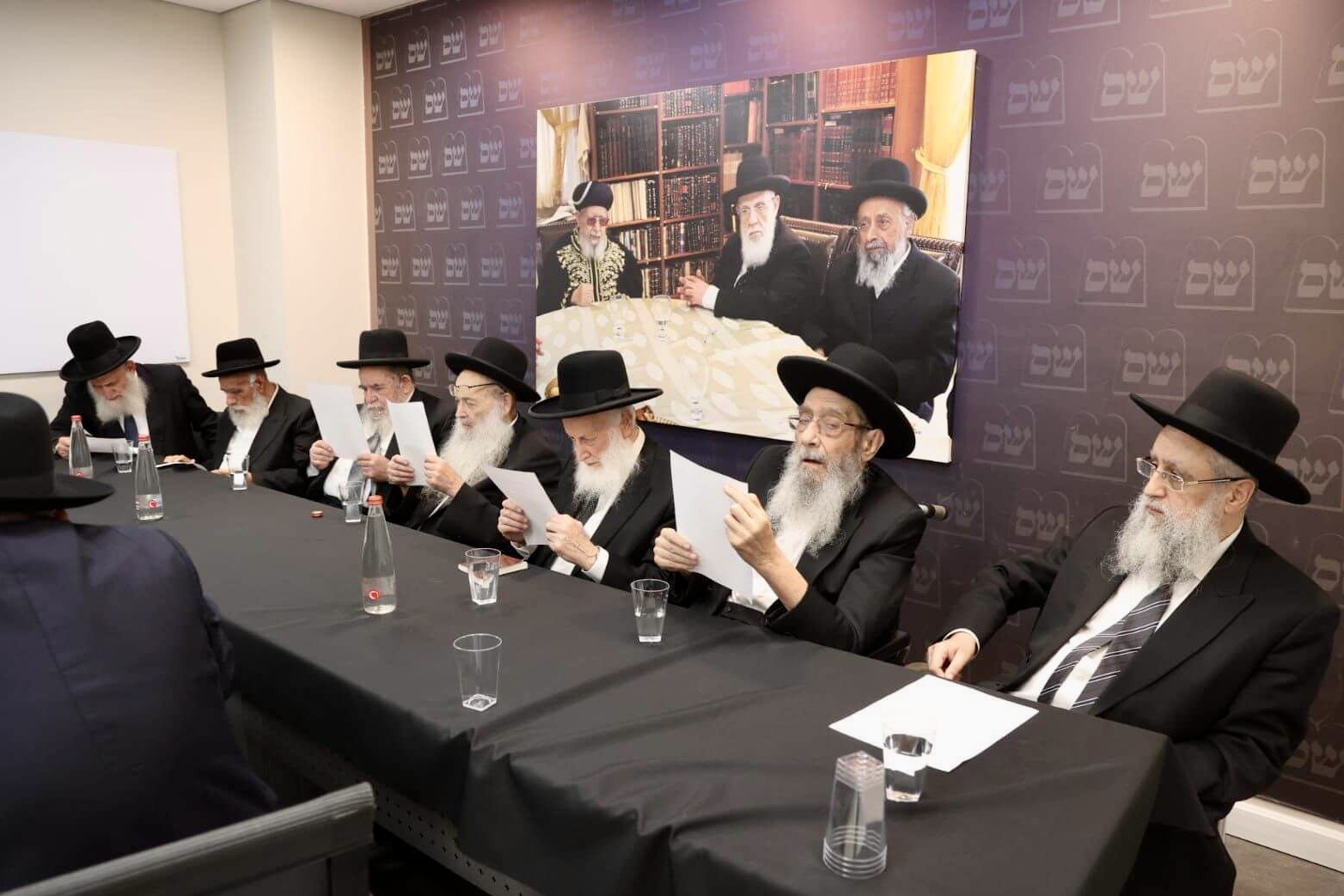
Moetzet Chachmei HaTorah Meeting

Up until the death of Rabbi Ovadia Yosef, the structure in Shas political authority was the same as that of Degel HaTorah. It was subject to the Sephardic Council of Torah Sages, and, from the cessation of support of Rabbi Shach, it was headed solely by the leadership of Rabbi Ovadia Yosef. It was particularly true after the appointment of Eli Yishai as chairman of the Shas party.

== Council members ==
As of 2025 the Members of the Sephardic Council of Torah Sages rabbis are:

- Rabbi Moshe Maya
- Rabbi Reuven Elbaz
- Rabbi Avraham Salim
- Rabbi Shmuel Betzalel
- Rabbi Shlomo Machpud
- Rabbi Yehuda Cohen
- Rabbi Yitzchak Yosef

== Previous members ==
- Rabbi Ovadia Yosef (1982-2013)
- Rabbi David Yosef (2013-2024)
- Rabbi Shalom Cohen(1984-2022)
- Rabbi Shimon Baadani (1984-2023)
- Rabbi Gavriel Toledano (1984-1990)
- Rabbi Shabtai Aton (1984-1990)
- Rabbi Shlomo Ben-Shimon (2022-2025)

== Presidents of the Council ==
- Rabbi Ovadia Yosef, 1982–2013 - Founded the Council and served as its president for 30 years, until his passing in 2013.
- Rabbi Shalom Cohen, 2013–2022 - Appointed following the passing of Rabbi Ovadia Yosef. Upon Rabbi Yosef's passing, control of Shas passed to Aryeh Deri, and due to the need for a spiritual figure, Rabbi Cohen was brought in to serve in this role.
- Rabbi Shimon Baadani, 2022–2023 - Following the passing of Rabbi Cohen, he was appointed President of the Council of Torah Sages. He served in his role as President of the Council of Torah Sages for a short period until his passing on January 11, 2023.

Since November 2024, a president for the Council has not been appointed. The senior member, Rabbi Moshe Maya, is referred to in official Shas publications as the "Elder of the Council of Torah Sages." On August 20, 2026, Shas chairman Aryeh Deri met with Rabbi Yitzchak Yosef amid a dispute over the party’s religious leadership. Under a proposed compromise, Deri would retain political leadership, while Yosef would serve as the movement’s principal religious authority, following the approach of his father, Ovadia Yosef, without assuming the formal title of president of the Council of Torah Sages. Deri presented Yosef with a letter from senior council member Moshe Maya supporting the proposed arrangement.

== Council secretaries ==
- Rabbi Yechezkel Aschayek (1982-1990)
- Rabbi Moshe Maya (1990-1999)
- Rabbi Rafael Pinhasi (1999-2013)
- Rabbi Amir Krispal (2014-2018)
- Rabbi Yoav Ben-Tzur (2019-Present)

== See also ==
- Ovadia Yosef
- Moetzes Gedolei HaTorah - The Ashkenazi council
- Shura council (Islamic Movement) - The Majlis al-Shura of the Islamic Movement in Israel
