= Reuven (name) =

Reuven, Reuben or Reuvein (Yiddish variant) is the eldest son of Jacob in the Bible. It is a Biblical masculine first name from the Hebrew רְאוּבֵן (Re'uven), meaning "behold, a son", as well as a surname. Bearers of the name include:

== Given name ==
- Reuven Abergel (born 1943), Moroccan-Israeli social and political activist
- Ruvén Afanador (born 1959), Colombian photographer
- Reuven Agami (born 1965), Dutch cancer researcher
- Reuven Amitai (born 1955), Israeli-American historian, writer and Hebrew University of Jerusalem dean
- Reuven Arazi (1907–1983), Israeli politician
- Reuven Atar (born 1969), Israeli football manager and former player
- Reuven Avi-Yonah, tax attorney, academic and author
- Reuven Azar (born 1967), Israeli ambassador
- Reuven Barkat (1906–1972), Israeli politician born Reuven Borstein
- Reuven Bar-On (born 1944), Israeli psychologist
- Reuven Brenner (born 1947), Romanian-born Israeli-Canadian economics professor
- Reuven Bulka (1944–2021), Canadian rabbi, writer, broadcaster and activist
- Reuven Carlyle (born 1965), American politician and businessman
- Reuven Dafni (1913–2005), British Second World War officer, member of the Haganah and Israeli diplomat
- Reuven Elbaz (born 1944), Sephardi Haredi rabbi and rosh yeshiva
- Reuven Feldman (1899–1990), Israeli politician
- Reuven Feuerstein (1921–2014), Romanian-born Israeli psychologist
- Reuven Frank (1920–2006), American journalist and broadcast news executive, twice president of NBC News
- Ruby Goldstein (1907–1984), American boxer and referee
- Reuven Hammer (1933–2019), American-Israeli Conservative rabbi, scholar of Jewish liturgy, author and lecturer
- Reuven Katz (1880–1963), rabbi and rosh yeshiva
- Reuven Niemeijer (born 1995), Dutch footballer
- Reuven Oved (born 1983), Israeli former footballer
- Reuven Ramaty (1937–2001), Hungarian astrophysicist
- Reuven Rivlin (born 1939), Israeli politician, lawyer and former president of Israel
- Reuven Rubin (1893–1974), Romanian-born Israeli painter and Israel's first ambassador to Romania
- Reuven Rubinstein (1938–2012), Israeli mathematician
- Reuven Shari (1903–1989), Russian-born Israeli politician
- Reuven Shefer (1925–2011), Israeli stage and film actor
- Reuven Shiloah (1909–1959), first director of the Mossad, Israel's national intelligence agency
- Reuven Snir (born 1953), Israeli professor at the University of Haifa
- Reuven Tal (1932–1967), Israeli footballer
- Reuven Tsur (1932–2021), professor emeritus of Hebrew literature and literary theory at Tel Aviv University
- Roby Young (born 1942), Israeli former footballer
- Reuven Yudalevich (1862–1933), a funder and founder of the city of Rishon Le Zion, Israel

== Surname ==
- Hen Reuven (born 1992), Israeli footballer
- Lior Reuven (born 1980), Israeli former footballer

== See also ==
- Caspar Reuvens (1793–1835), Dutch historian and archaeologist
