= Kimberly Graves =

American government official

- Occupation: Executive Director of the Department of Veterans Affairs

Kimberly Graves is a senior executive director for the St. Paul, Minnesota office of the Veterans Benefits Administration or VBA, a subsidiary organization of the United States Department of Veterans Affairs (VA). She is most known for a controversy beginning in 2014 in which she, along with another executive director within the VA, was accused of abusing her authority to take advantage of the VA's PCS procedures and of embezzling public funds.

The misconduct and lack of consequences of Graves were noted by both Democratic and Republican lawmakers. The wake of Graves scandal lead to the passage of laws aimed at increasing accountability for VA employees, including the VA Accountability and Whistleblower Justice Protection Act. However, Graves is still serving as the Senior Executive Director of the Saint Paul Regional Office.

== Career ==
Graves' public career began in the Veterans Benefits Administration, an organizational element of the Department of Veterans Affairs responsible for providing financial assistance to military veterans. She would later become Director at the Philadelphia regional office for the VBA. In 2010, she was named director of the VBA's Eastern Area Office, responsible for offices across 14 states. She volunteered in 2014 to head the St. Paul regional office.

== Controversy ==
In 2014 Graves volunteered for a transfer from the Philadelphia regional office to the St. Paul regional office for an open position that held considerably less responsibilities. She and her peer Diana Rubens were allegedly informed by superiors, possibly by the former VA undersecretary for benefits Allison Hickey, of loopholes within the VA's employee transfer program that would allow for financial gain.

In her move to Minnesota, Graves expensed nearly $130,000 in moving fees to the VA, which attracted the attention of the VA's inspector general. Upon investigation, it was ascertained that Graves had used her senior position at the Philadelphia office to pressure a subordinate to leave their job, thus opening the position in St. Paul. Graves then volunteered for the position with reduced responsibilities. However, she retained her $174,000 salary despite the lessened responsibilities. Graves and was transferred to a separate location and demoted while under investigation.

Hickey resigned her post in October 2015 amid investigations into her role aiding Graves and Rubens in their transfer scheme. The VA announced it would review its transfer program due to the growing number of cases involving abuse of authority.

Graves and Rubens both appealed their demotions with the Merit Systems Protection Board and pleaded the Fifth in hearings surrounding the allegations. The Inspector General recommended the Justice Department proceed with criminal charges.

In January 2016 a judge overturned Graves' demotion. The reason given was that the VA was inconsistent in its discipline of both Graves and Rubens, since it had not previously disciplined other employees who had committed similar violations. The judge also cited Graves' superiors' knowledge of her intent as evidence that no wrong-doing had occurred. Graves was reinstated effective immediately and was awarded back-pay.

The decision to overturn her demotion was widely criticized by both Democratic representative Tim Walz and Republican Jeff Miller who cite the VA's lack of accountability and transparency. She was reinstated to her previous St. Paul post with her increased salary, effective immediately. The VA declared in early February that it would punish Graves and Rubens without demoting either. "Rubens and Graves clearly should have been fired" observed Miller, who went on to iterate a complete lack of confidence in the VA's transparency and integrity.

In November 2015, it was learned that Graves had received a bonus of almost $8,700 in 2014, "the same year she was under federal investigation for allegedly abusing her authority for personal gain". The VA stated it lacked the authority to "recoup more than $400,000 from two senior VA executives who manipulated the hiring system to get their jobs of choice and received hundreds of thousands in extra money to relocate".

Veterans of the armed services expressed outrage at Graves' actions, along with the VA's refusal to fire her, to recoup the embezzled tax-payer dollars, or to seriously reprimand its employees that had broken the law. The American Legion expressed a similar dissatisfaction with the VA's lack of discipline and, noting their retention of ample salaries, called the scandal an "insult and a disgrace to all veterans".

In addition, Pete Hegseth of Concerned Veterans for America accused Secretary of Veterans Affairs Robert A. McDonald of ineffective leadership and of perpetuating a culture of dishonesty within the VA. Democrat Richard Blumenthal called the VA's reinstating of Graves and Rubens "an appallingly insufficient punishment". More broad criticisms have arisen about the accountability of federal employees, who are alleged to be very difficult to fire despite proven corruption and misconduct.

== See also ==
- Veterans Health Administration scandal of 2014
