= Rupen =

Rupen may refer to:

== People ==
- Rupen of Montfort (died 1313), Cypriot nobleman
- Rupen Sevag, real name Ruben Çilingiryan (1886–1915), Ottoman Armenian poet, prose writer and doctor, killed by Turkish authorities during the Armenian Genocide
- Rupen Zartarian (1874–1915), Ottoman Armenian writer, educator, and political activist, killed by Turkish authorities during the Armenian Genocide

== Places ==
- Rupen River, Gujarat, India
- Rupen River (Gir), Gujarat, India

== See also ==
- Reuben, a given name
- Roupen, a given name
