= Yad Eliyahu =

Neighborhood in Tel Aviv

Coordinates: 32.0593°N 34.7971°E

Givat Herzl גבעת הרצל
- Neighborhood of Tel Aviv
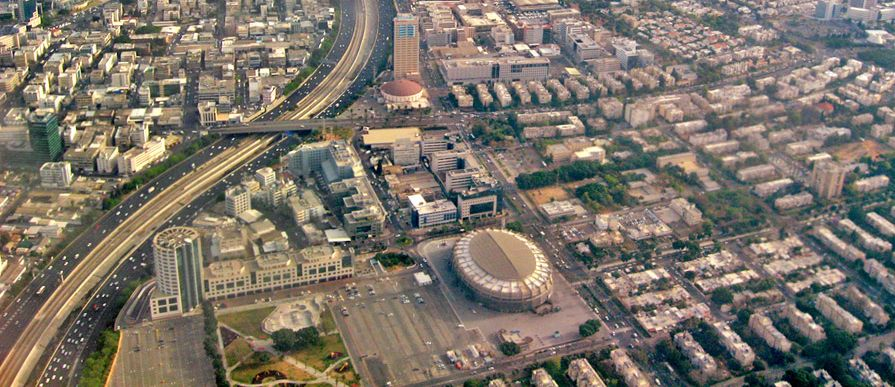
- Aerial view of the neighborhood
- Interactive map of Givat Herzl
- Country: Israel
- City: Tel Aviv
- Established: 1929

Yad Eliyahu (Hebrew: יד אליהו) is a neighborhood in east Tel Aviv, Israel.

Yad Eliyahu was established in 1929. It developed in accordance with plans drawn up by Jacob Ben Sira, the Tel Aviv municipal engineer. The neighborhood, named for Haganah leader Eliyahu Golomb, became the site of housing projects for ex-servicemen after World War II.

Menora Mivtachim Arena, home to the Maccabi Tel Aviv basketball team is located in Yad Eliyahu.

== Notable residents ==
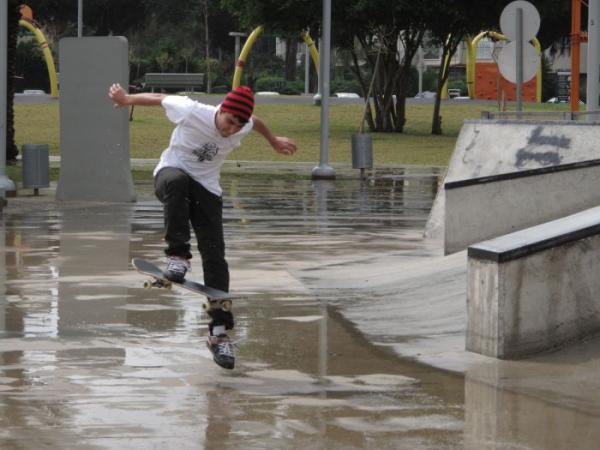
The skateboard park in the neighbourhood.

- Dani Dayan
- Ilana Dayan
- Shulamit Lapid
- Tommy Lapid
- Yair Lapid
- Yaakov Amidror
- Moshe Maya
- Anita Shapira
