= Shalom Cohen (rabbi) =

Israeli rabbi (1930–2022)

Rabbi Shalom Cohen
- שלום כהן
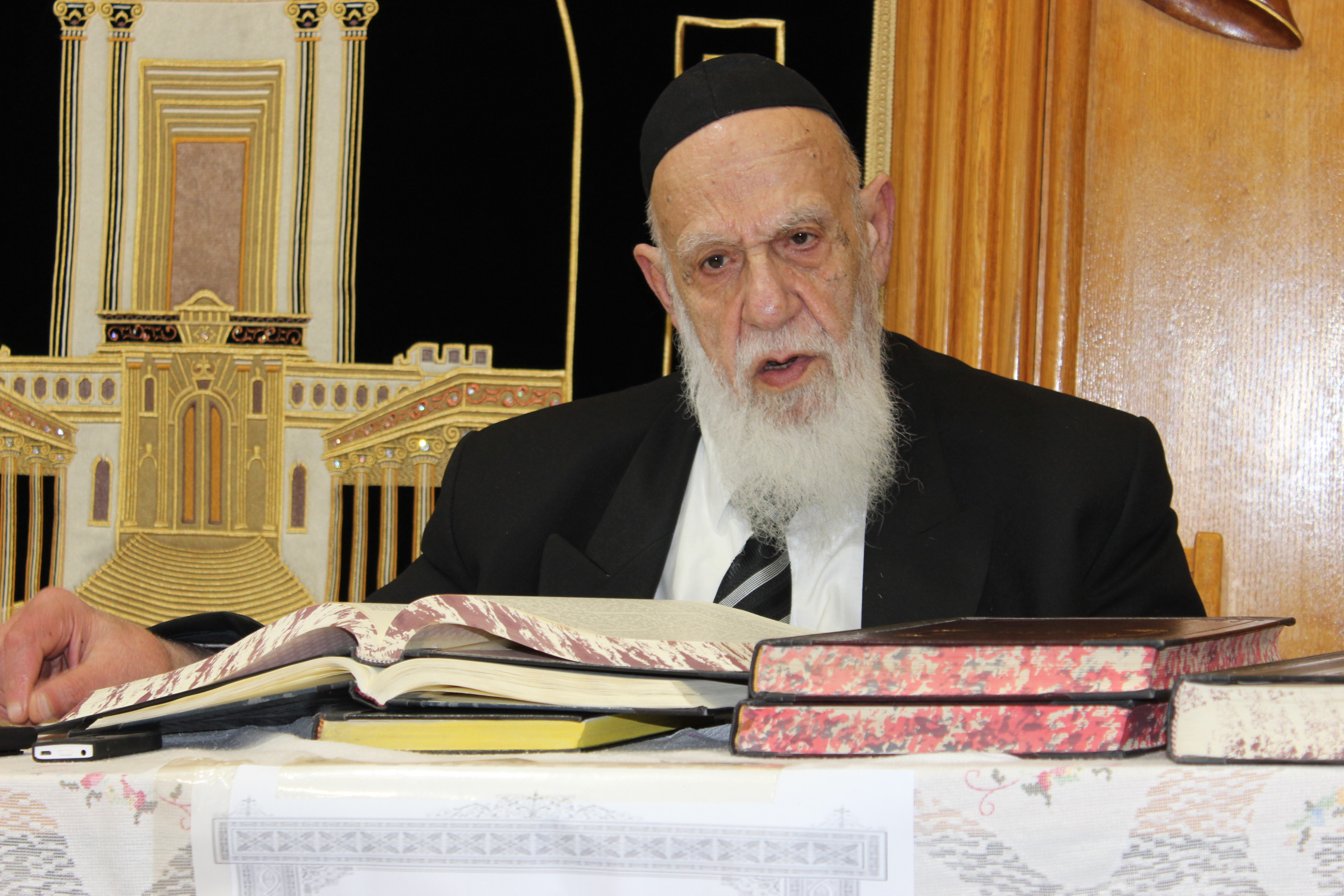
- Cohen in 2014

Personal life
- Born: 3 November 1930 Jerusalem, Mandatory Palestine
- Died: 22 August 2022 (aged 91) Jerusalem, Israel
- Spouse: Yael Ben Shimon
- Children: 8
- Education: Porat Yosef Yeshiva

Religious life
- Religion: Judaism

Jewish leader
- Predecessor: Rabbi Ben-Zion Abba Shaul
- Position: Rosh Yeshiva
- Yeshiva: Porat Yosef Yeshiva
- Began: 1966
- Ended: 2022
- Other: President of Moetzet Chachmei HaTorah

Shalom Cohen (Hebrew: שלום כהן; 3 November 1930 – 22 August 2022) was an Israeli Haredi Sephardi rabbi. He was rosh yeshiva of the Old City branch of Porat Yosef Yeshiva, and the spiritual leader of the Shas political party. He was a member of the party's Moetzet Chachmei HaTorah rabbinic council from 1984 until his death and was its oldest member.

== Early life and education ==
Born on 3 November 1930, Shalom Cohen was one of eight children of Rabbi Efraim Hakohen, a Sephardi kabbalist, in Jerusalem who had been a disciple of Yosef Hayyim in Baghdad before immigrating to Palestine in 1924. In 1930, the year Cohen was born, his father was appointed rosh yeshiva of Porat Yosef Yeshiva in the Old City of Jerusalem.

Cohen began studying at Porat Yosef Yeshiva at the age of 13, and developed a reputation for "diligence and ingenuity". He married Yael, the daughter of Rabbi Mansour Ben Shimon, a Safed kabbalist who also taught at Porat Yosef. The couple had eight children.

Cohen began delivering shiurim at Porat Yosef after his wedding, and taught students for decades. He was named rosh yeshiva of the Old City branch of Porat Yosef Yeshiva in 1966. Though his father and father-in-law were kabbalists, he himself was not.

== Political activity ==
Cohen entered the political arena for the first time in 1984, when he agreed to Rabbi Ovadia Yosef's request to support the founding of the Shas party and serve on the new Moetzet Chachmei HaTorah rabbinic council. In April 2014, six months after Yosef's death, Cohen succeeded him as nasi (president) of the council.

Cohen was an outspoken critic of Modern Orthodox and secular Jews in Israel. In 2013, he compared the Religious Zionist community to Amalek, the biblical archenemy of the Jewish people, and in 2015, he called the Israeli national anthem, "Hatikvah", "a stupid song". He told Israeli soldiers at a prayer rally during the 2014 Israel–Gaza conflict, "Do you think the people of Israel need an army? It is God Almighty who fights for Israel."

He also expressed hard-line views on issues affecting the Haredi community in Israel. In 2014, he decried the dire effects on Israeli Sephardi Jews of the proposed Israeli law to draft yeshiva students, and issued a letter in which he forbade Haredi women from undertaking post-high-school studies at academic colleges. He urged his constituency to refrain from using smartphones and to strengthen their involvement in Torah study.

== Other activities ==
Cohen was on the board of Beis Din Tzedek Neveh Tzion, a kosher certification agency founded by his brothers-in-law, Rabbi Nissim Ben Shimon and Rabbi Shlomo Ben Shimon.

== Death ==
Cohen died in Jerusalem on 22 August 2022, at the age of 91; tens of thousands attended the funeral.
