= Moshe Maya =

Israeli politician (born 1938)

- משה מאיה
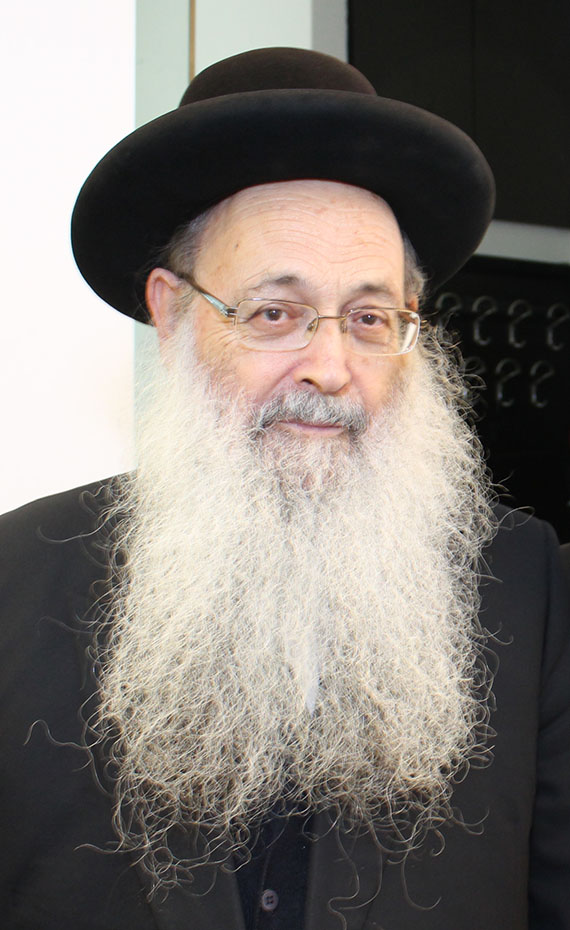
- Maya in 2013

Faction represented in the Knesset
- 1992–1996: Shas

Personal details
- Born: 9 August 1938 (age 86); Petah Tikva, Mandatory Palestine

Moshe Maya (Hebrew: משה מאיה; born 9 August 1938) is an Israeli Haredi rabbi and former politician who served as a member of the Knesset for Shas between 1992 and 1996, and as Deputy Minister of Education and Culture from 1992 until 1993.

== Biography ==
Born in Petah Tikva during the Mandate period, Maya was ordained as a rabbi, and served as the rabbi of Yad Eliyahu neighbourhood of Tel Aviv. He was elected to the Knesset on the Shas list in 1992, and was appointed Deputy Minister of Education and Culture in Yitzhak Rabin's government, holding the post until Shas left the coalition in 1993. He lost his seat in the 1996 elections.

Maya remained a member of Shas, and is currently part of its Shas Council of Torah Sages. He also heads the Zikron Moshe yeshiva in Yad Eliyahu.
