= Shimon Baadani =

Sephardi rabbi (1928–2023)

Rabbi Shimon Baadani
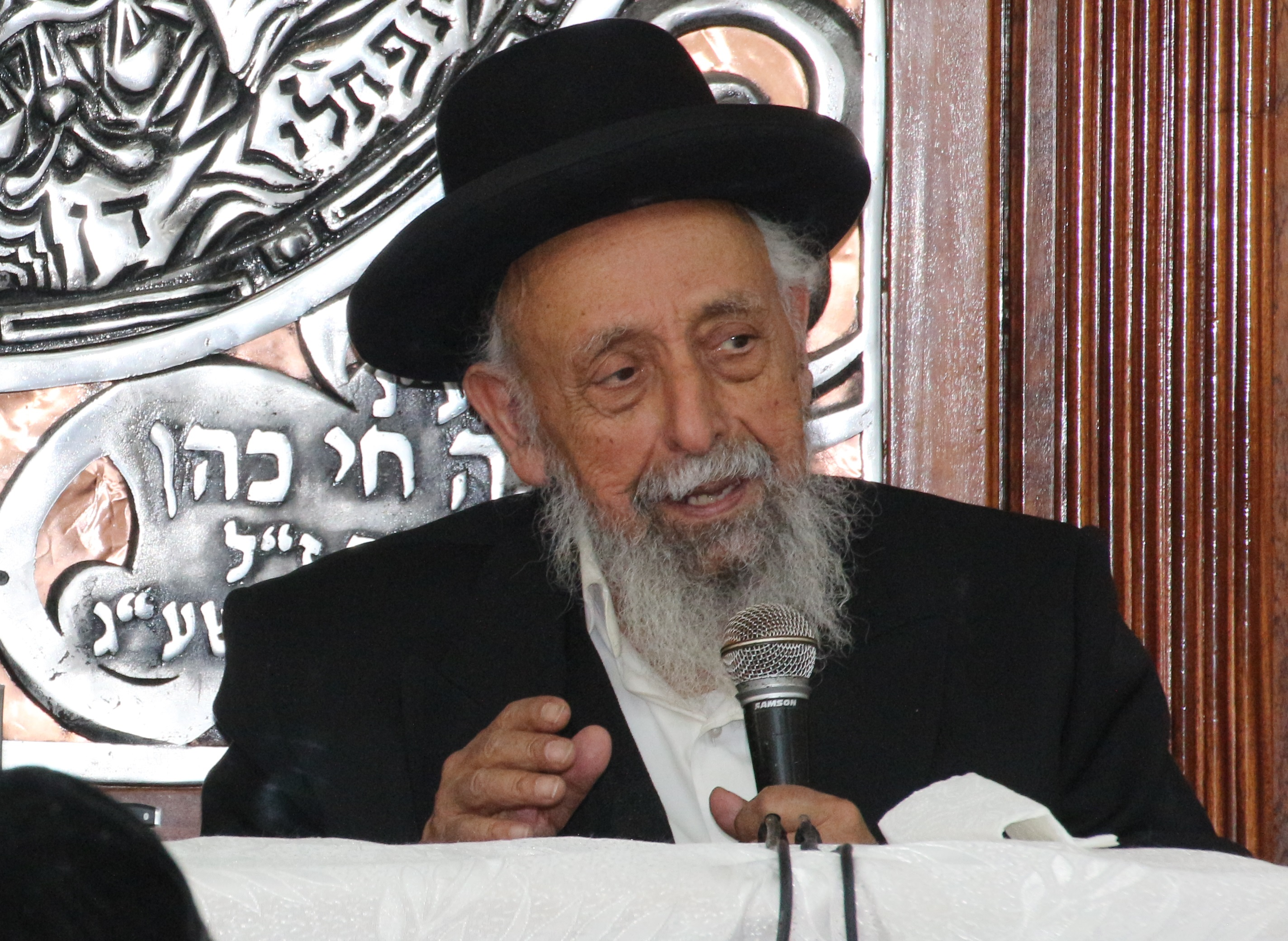
- Baadani giving a shiur in 2018

Personal life
- Born: Shimon Baadani; 1928 Hadera, Mandatory Palestine
- Died: 11 January 2023 (aged 94)
- Spouse: Shulamit Abadai
- Children: 7
- Parent(s): Dawid and Haviva Baadani
- Education: Porat Yosef Yeshiva

Religious life
- Religion: Judaism
- Denomination: Orthodox Judaism
- Yeshiva: Kollel Torah V'Chaim
- Position: Rosh Kollel
- Other: Member, Moetzet Chachmei HaTorah
- Residence: Bnei Brak

Shimon Baadani (Hebrew: שמעון בעדני; 1928 – 11 January 2023), also spelled Shimon Ba'adani, was a leading Sephardi rabbi and rosh kollel in Israel. He was the co-founder and dean of Kollel Torah V'Chaim in Bnei Brak, and served as president of dozens of Torah institutions. He was also a senior leader of the Shas political party and a member of that party's Moetzet Chachmei HaTorah rabbinical leadership council.

== Early life and education ==
Shimon Baadani was born in 1928 in Hadera, Mandatory Palestine. His parents, Dawid and Haviva Baadani, were both Jews from Yemen who had had ten children in their homeland, of whom only two sons and one daughter survived. Shimon was their eleventh and last child.

Baadani's parents initially sent him to a Mafdal (Religious Zionist) school that provided religious education. Baadani went on to attend the Novardok yeshiva in Hadera before transferring to the Beis Yosef-Novardok yeshiva in Jerusalem, where Rabbi Elazar Shach was serving as rosh yeshiva. After several years, Baadani moved to Porat Yosef Yeshiva in Jerusalem, then led by rosh yeshiva Ezra Attiya; this was at the suggestion of Shach. Following the destruction of the Porat Yosef Yeshiva building in the Old City, Baadani was asked to form a branch of the yeshiva in the Katamon neighborhood for the benefit of newly arrived Mizrahi Jewish immigrants. This branch later became an independent yeshiva, also led by Baadani.

== Career ==
Baadani co-founded Kollel Torah V'Chaim in Bnei Brak together with Rabbi Moshe Pardo. He has taught many students who went on to serve as rabbis, rosh yeshivas, dayanim (rabbinical judges), and morei horaah (halakhic arbiters) in Israel and the world. Baadani was also the president of "dozens" of Torah institutions.

Beginning in the 1970s, Baadani involved himself in strengthening the Jewish communities of Latin America. At the urging of Rabbi David Kassin, an officer at Congregation Keter Torah in Mexico City, Baadani sent his student Rabbi Chaim Harari to establish a yeshiva in that city. Baadani visited Argentina at the end of the 20th century, encouraging Jewish families to send their sons to yeshivas in Israel. He regularly traveled to Mexico and Panama to encourage those communities as well.

== Political views ==
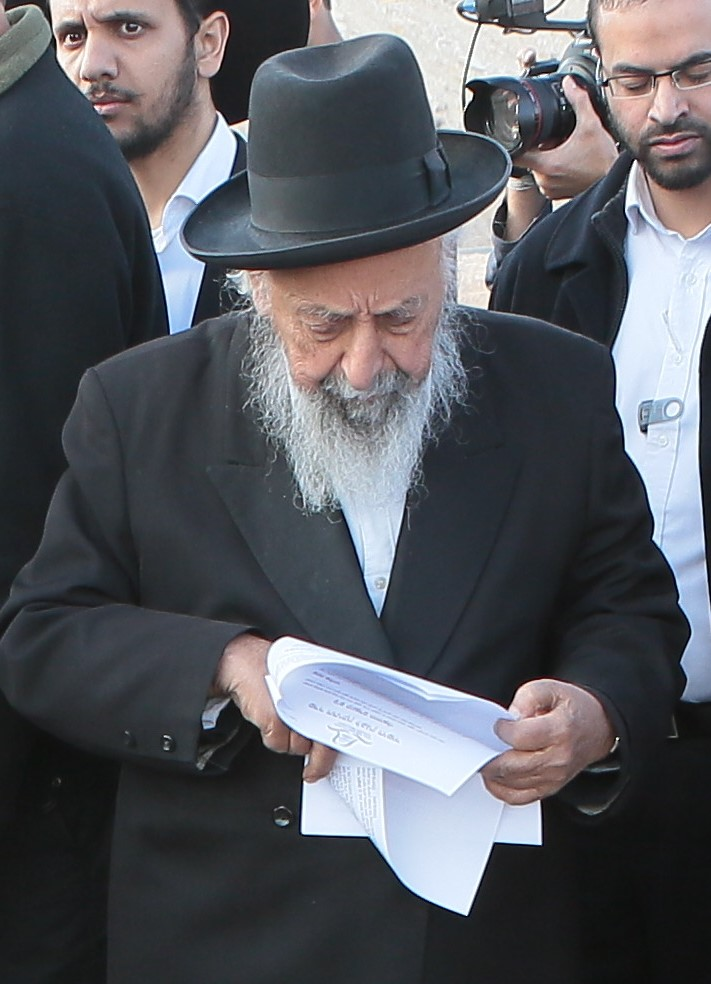
Baadani at a cornerstone-laying ceremony in Harish, Israel, 2015

Baadani was involved in the formation of the Shas party in 1984. He was a member of the party's Moetzet Chachmei HaTorah rabbinical leadership council.

Baadani often elicited controversy for his outspokenness on political matters. He was unafraid to speak his mind even if his comments were contentious. After sitting in the government of Ehud Barak from 1999 to 2001, Baadani said it was like "living in Sodom". He attacked Shas' coalition partners in the Netanyahu government of 2013–2015, calling Yair Lapid "Amalek" and the Religious Zionist rabbis and leaders of The Jewish Home "animals, idiots". In 2006 he suggested that the reason for Prime Minister Ariel Sharon's stroke was because Sharon had aligned himself with the secular Shinui party. He added that those who did not vote for Shas in the elections would go to hell. In June 2008 Baadani was openly critical of the Tel Aviv Pride Parade, stating: "So much dirt on the street and making it proud? There was no such thing in the Jewish people. It's disgusting".

== Personal life ==
Baadani was known for his simple lifestyle and demeanor. He made himself available to petitioners at his home and by phone; he had a listed number and answered the phone himself. He did not have his own association or central fund, but assisted widows from his personal bank account and provided tefillin for orphaned boys celebrating their Bar Mitzvah. He was successful in the area of shidduchim (marriage matches); among the matches he suggested are those of Torah leaders, notably Rishon Letzion Rabbi Eliyahu Bakshi-Doron. He set aside one room of his house for a matchmaking organization and paid the salaries of the shadchanim himself.

Baadani married Shulamit Abadai, with whom he had seven children. His sons are Rabbi David Yeshaya Baadani, rosh kollel of Kollel Taharot in Jerusalem, established by his father; Rabbi Moshe Baadani, a rosh chaburah (study group leader) in the kollel; and Rabbi Chaim Baadani, director of Torah V'Chaim institutions. He also has four daughters.

In 2014, Baadani's 17-year-old grandson Shalom Aharon Baadani, son of Rabbi David Yeshaya Baadani, was killed by a Palestinian terrorist in a vehicular attack near a Jerusalem Light Rail station.

Baadani died after a long illness on 11 January 2023, at the age of 94.
