= Giulio Rubini =

Italian rugby union player (born 1987)

- Born: 24 April 1987 (age 39) Frascati, Italy
- Height: 5 ft 8 in (173 cm)
- Weight: 185 lb (84 kg)

Rugby union career
- Position: Utility back
International career
Years	Team	Apps	(Points)
2009	Italy	4	(0)

Giulio Rubini (born 24 April 1987) is an Italian former rugby union international.

A utility back from Frascati, Rubini twice won the Coppa Italia title with Parma and in 2009 made four Test appearances for Italy. His debut came in Italy's Five Nations match against Scotland, coming on off the bench to play at fullback. He started on the wing for subsequent matches against Wales and France. Having kept his place in the squad for the Australian tour, Rubini featured in the second of the two Test matches, which was held in Melbourne.

Rubini's elder brother is rugby player and television chef Gabriele Rubini.

== See also ==
- List of Italy national rugby union players
