= Shura council (Islamic Movement) =

Religious council in Israel

The Shura council is the religious council consisting of 32 members which involved in the decision making of the Southern branch of the Islamic Movement in Israel and historically Ra'am. It had been compared to the Moetzes Gedolei HaTorah of United Torah Judaism and Moetzet Chachmei HaTorah of Shas.

In 2025, Ra'am leader Mansour Abbas announced that his party would sever ties with Islamist organisations like the shura council. The shura council was involved in the candidate selection process up to this point.

== See also ==
- Majlis al-Shura, for other usages of the name
