= Rubens (given name) =

Rubens may be a given name. Notable people with the name include:

== Mononyms ==
- Rubens (footballer, born 1928) (Rubens Josué da Costa, 1928–1991), Brazilian football forward
- Rubens (footballer, born 1941) (1941–2016), Jorge Rubens Caetano; Brazilian footballer
- Rubens (footballer, born 1994) (Rubens da Silva Coura), Brazilian footballer
- Rubens (footballer, born 2001) (Rubens Antonio Dias), Brazilian football midfielder

== Other ==
- Rubens Barrichello (born 1972), Brazilian racing driver
- Rubens Donizete (born 1979), Brazilian mountain biker
- Rubens Augusto de Souza Espínola
- Rubens Bassini
- Rubens Bertogliati
- Rubens Cardoso
- Rubens Charles Maciel
- Rubens Duval
- Rubens Ewald Filho
- Rubens Fadini
- Rubens Farias Jr.
- Rubens Fernando Moedim
- Rubens Figueiredo
- Rubens Florentino Vaz
- Rubens Galaxe
- Rubens Gerchman
- Rubens Joseph
- Rubens Júnior
- Rubens Korubin
- Rubens Menin
- Rubens Minelli
- Rubens Moedim
- Rubens Mukindo
- Rubens Nicola
- Rubens Ometto
- Rubens Osvaldo Jesús Udaquiola Laport
- Rubens Otoni
- Rubens Paiva
- Rubens Peale
- Rubens Peale with a Geranium
- Rubens Pedrazzi
- Rubens Pereira Júnior
- Rubens Pinheiro
- Rubens Raimundo da Silva
- Rubens Recalcatti
- Rubens Rialto Square Theater
- Rubens Ricoldi
- Rubens Ricupero
- Rubens Salles
- Rubens Sambueza
- Rubens Santoro
- Rubens Tadeu Hartmann Ricoldi
- Rubens Teixeira Scavone
- Rubens Torres
- Rubens Vase
- Rubens Vieira

== See also ==
- Rubens (surname)
