= Amnon Yitzhak =

Haredi Orthodox Rabbi of Yemenite origin involved in Kiruv in Israel

Amnon Yitzhak אמנון יצחק
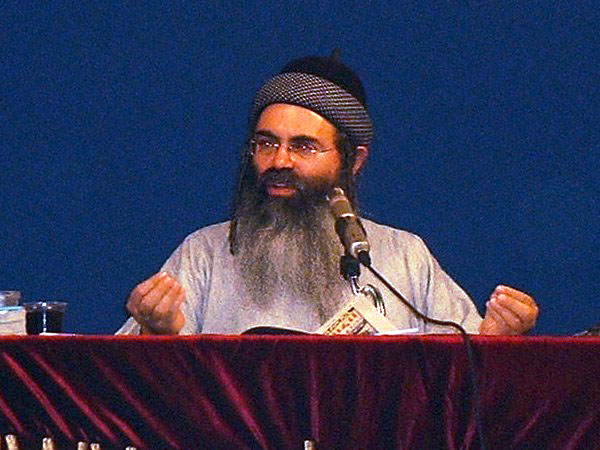
- Amnon Yitzchak at a seminar on spiritual improvement and repentance in Acre, Israel, 2006.
- Born: November 8, 1953 (age 72); Ramla, Israel
- Citizenship: Israel
- Known for: Kiruv

Amnon Yitzhak (Hebrew: אַמְנוֹן יִצְחָק; born 8 November 1953) is a Haredi Israeli rabbi of Yemenite Jewish descent. He is best known for his involvement in Orthodox Judaism outreach (kiruv) among Israel's Sephardi and Mizrahi populations. He and Rabbi Reuven Elbaz are considered the leaders of the Sephardi baal teshuva movement in Israel. He is involved in activities centered on helping Jews to become more religious or observant through public speaking in Israel and around the world, and his 'Shofar' organization, which distributes his lectures in various media and on the internet.

== Biography ==
Amnon Yitzhak was born to Yahya Zechariah Yitzchak and Rumia Yitzchak in Tel Aviv, Israel to a Yemenite Jewish family. He was brought up in a non-religious home, and became religious at the age of 24, after stumbling across the religious handbook, Kitzur Shulchan Aruch, which he received for his Bar Mitzvah.

In 1986, he established the non-profit organization 'Shofar' for promoting the "return to religion" among the Jewish Israeli population. His lectures and other activities have made Yitzhak a prominent Israeli rabbi since the early 1990s. Through 'Shofar', Yitzhak has launched two widely distributed weekly newspapers, Arba Kanfot and Shofar News geared to the Haredi public and general public respectively. They ceased publication in 2008.

== Views on secular Zionism ==
Yitzhak has also addressed the issue of the secular Zionist leadership, and has released, for example, a video titled "Herzl and Zionism", which presents a critical view of both. Yitzhak has said, referring to Theodor Herzl, "There have been two great criminals in the history of the Jewish people: Hitler and Herzl. Hitler wanted to destroy the body of the Jewish nation. Herzl wanted to kill the soul, which is far more important than the body."

In a cassette titled "In the Shadow of Democracy", he strongly criticizes the State of Israel and the leadership for their attitude towards the Mizrahi-traditional and Haredi Jewish public, especially during the period of the Holocaust. According to Avishai Ben-Haim, Ynet correspondent on Jewish Religious Affairs, Yitzhak "is considered to have a clear anti-Zionist position, similar to that of the Satmar Hasidim. Like them, he boycotts the Knesset elections. This view is extremely rare among the Haredi-Mizrahi public, and even rarer among Mizrahi newly-observant Jews - Amnon Yitzhak's primary target audience." Nonetheless, he had announced his guiding and leadership (the rabbi himself was outside the political list and was not running himself to the 19th Knesset) of the Israeli political party Koah Lehashpi'a for the 2013 Knesset elections in late November 2012. In a 2012 interview he declared that “none are more Zionist than me” In a 2010 lecture, he explained that his issue is secular Zionism that looks to detach Israel from Judaism - in his words, “There needs to be a difference between the state of Israel, the land of Israel and the people of Israel. The land of Israel - our land. The people of Israel - our people. The state of Israel’s policy to uproot Judaism from itself - has no right to exist.” His party did not pass the election threshold, and therefore did not enter to the 19th Knesset. The party received 28,000 votes.

== Views on women ==
In 2013, Yitzhak asserted that women should not drive cars, claiming "It is immodest for a woman to drive".

== See also ==
- Baal teshuva
- Haredim and Zionism
- Jewish fundamentalism
- Orthodox Judaism outreach
