= Roupen =

Roupen is a Western Armenian variant of Reuben.

It may also refer to:

- Roupenids or Rubenids, an Armenian dynasty who dominated parts of Cilicia
  - Roupen I of Armenia (1025/1035 – 1095), the first lord of Armenian Cilicia or "Lord of the Mountains" from 1080/1081/1082 to 1095, founder of Rubenid dynasty
  - Roupen II of Armenia (c.1165–1170), the seventh lord of Armenian Cilicia or "Lord of the Mountains" from 1169 to 1170.
  - Roupen III of Armenia (1145–1187), the ninth lord of Armenian Cilicia or "Lord of the Mountains" from 1175 to 1187.
- Roupen Altiparmakian, Armenian master of the violin and oud.
- Roupen Der-Minassian (1882–1951), Armenian politician and revolutionary of the Armenian Revolutionary Federation (ARF) who played an important role in the Armenian national liberation movement and later in the First Republic of Armenia
- Roupen Tarpinian (1883-1968), Armenian politician and activist in the Armenian Revolutionary Federation (ARF) and for a brief period, Justice minister during the First Republic of Armenia
- Roupen Zartarian or Ruben Zardaryan (1874–1915), Ottoman Armenian writer, educator, and political activist. He was killed by Ottoman authorities during the Armenian genocide

== See also ==
- Reuben, people with the given name
- Rupen (disambiguation)
