= Diana Rubens =

American Veterans Affairs official

- Occupation: Executive Director of the Department of Veterans Affairs

Diana Rubens is a senior executive director for the Philadelphia office of the Veterans Benefits Administration or VBA, a subsidiary organization of the United States Department of Veterans Affairs (VA). She is notable for a 2014 controversy in which she, along with a colleague, was accused of abusing authority and embezzling public funds, taking advantage of the VA's PCS procedures.

== Career ==
Rubens began her tenure in the VA as a director of the Western Area offices. She would later be promoted to the position of Deputy Under Secretary of Field Operations for the VBA. In 2013 she headed an initiative with the goal of processing the massive backlog of Veterans' claims within the VA systems. Eventually, Rubens would be promoted to the position of Executive Director of field-operations within the VBA at the Washington D.C. office. She volunteered in 2014 to head the Philadelphia regional office.

== Controversy ==
In 2014 Rubens volunteered for a transfer from the D.C. regional office to the Philadelphia regional office to fill an opening that held considerably fewer responsibilities. She and her peer Kimberly Graves were allegedly informed by superior Allison Hickey, the former VA undersecretary for benefits, of loopholes within the VA's employee transfer program that would allow them to pocket large sums of taxpayer dollars.

Hickey resigned her post in October 2015 amid investigations into her role aiding the two women in their transfer scheme. The VA announced it would review its transfer program due to the growing number of cases involving abuse of authority.

Rubens expensed nearly $275,000 in moving fees to the VA while relocating to Philadelphia, attracting the attention of the VA's inspector general. Upon investigation, it was learned that Rubens had used her position to pressure a subordinate to leave his job at the Philadelphia office, thus opening that position. Rubens then volunteered for the position that held significantly reduced responsibilities, but managed to retain her $181,000 salary. Rubens and was transferred to a separate location and demoted while under investigation.

Rubens and Graves both made appeals to the Merit Systems Protection Board and pleaded the Fifth amendment regarding the allegations. The Inspector General recommended the Justice Department proceed with criminal charges.

A judge overturned Rubens’ demotion in January 2016, sparking outrage. The court stated that punishing Rubens and Graves was inconsistent disciplining behavior by the VA, since it had not similarly punished other employees that had committed offenses. The judge also cited her superiors’ foreknowledge of her intent as evidence that no laws had been broken. Rubens was reinstated effective immediately and was awarded back-pay.

The ruling to overturn her demotion was blasted by both Democratic representative Tim Walz and Republican Jeff Miller who criticized the VA’s lack of accountability and transparency. She was reinstated to her previous Philadelphia post with her previous, higher salary. The VA declared in early February that it would punish Rubens and Graves without demoting either. "Rubens and Graves clearly should have been fired" observed Miller, who went on to iterate a complete lack of confidence in the VA's transparency and integrity.

In November 2015, it was learned that Rubens had received a bonus of over $8,000 in 2014 while under investigation for abusing her authority to embezzle public funds. The VA stated it lacked the authority to recover upwards of $400,000 from Rubens and Graves.

Military veterans expressed outrage at Rubens’ actions and at the VA’s refusal to fire her, to recoup the embezzled public funds, or to take meaningful actions to reprimand its employees that had broken the law. The American Legion expressed a similar dissatisfaction with the VA’s lack of discipline and, noting their retention of ample salaries, called the scandal an “insult and a disgrace to all veterans”.

In addition, Pete Hegseth of Concerned Veterans for America accused Secretary of the VA Robert A. McDonald of ineffective leadership and of perpetuating a culture of dishonesty within the VA. Democrat Richard Blumenthal called the VA's reinstating of Rubens and Graves "an appallingly insufficient punishment". More broad criticisms have arisen about the accountability of federal employees, who are alleged to be very difficult to fire even after being proven to have committed corruption.

== See also ==
- Veterans Health Administration scandal of 2014
