= Gabriele Rubini =

Italian television presenter (born 1983)

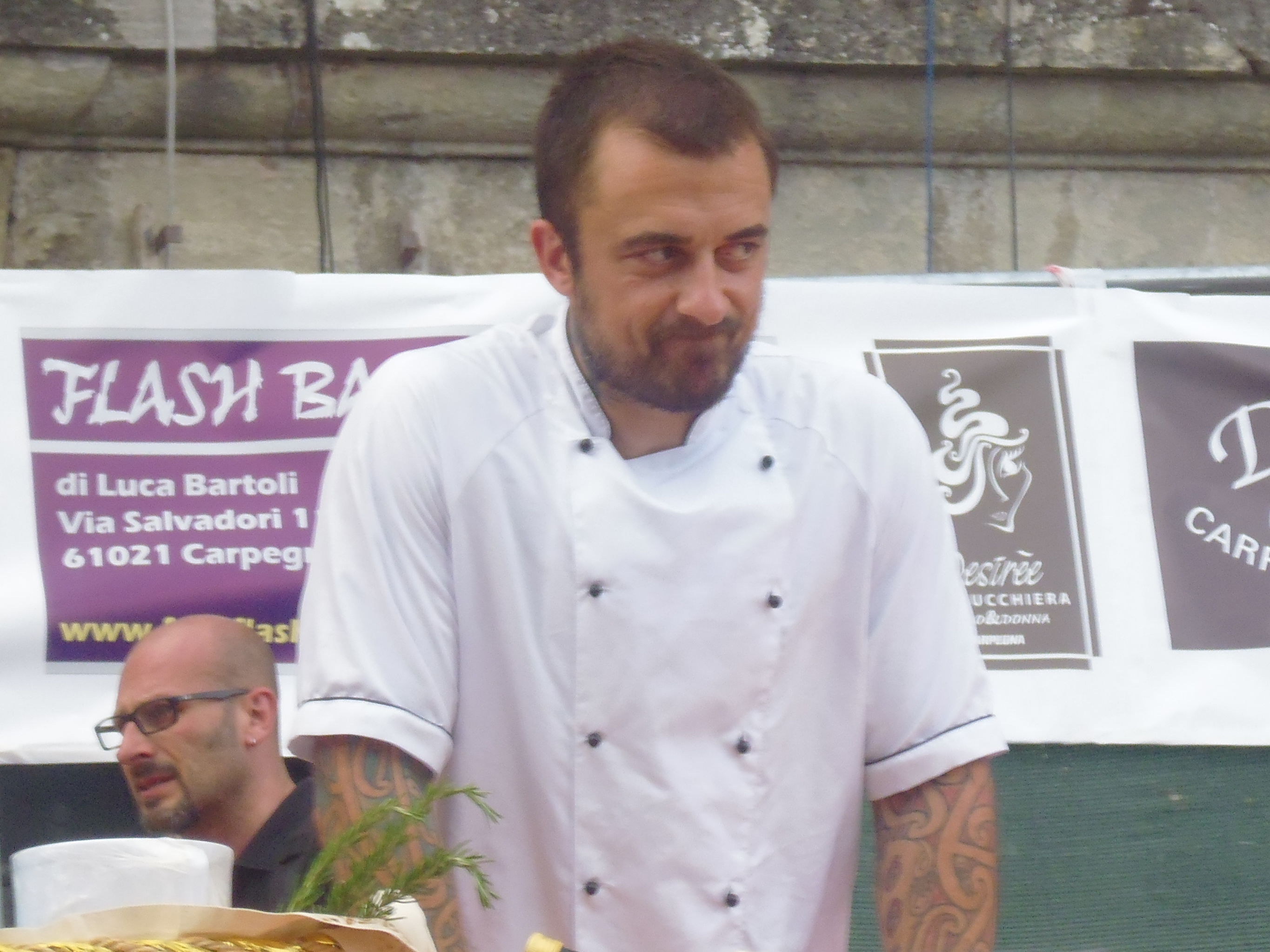
- Rubini in 2014
- Born: June 29, 1983 (age 43) Frascati, Italy
- Height: 1.90 m (6 ft 3 in)
- Weight: 108 kg (17 st 0 lb)

Rugby union career
- Position: Flanker
Senior career
Years	Team	Apps	(Points)
2002-2004	Parma		
2004-2005	Roma	12	(0)
2005-2006	Poneke FC		
2007-2008	Rovigo	10	(0)
2008-2011	Lazio		
- Correct as of 13 November 2013
- Correct as of 24 November 2013

Gabriele Rubini (known professionally as Chef Rubio; born 29 June 1983) is an Italian chef, television presenter and former rugby player.

== Sporting career ==
Born in Frascati, he is the brother of professional rugby player Giulio Rubini. Gabriele played rugby from an early age, after making his debut in 2002 for Rugby Roma Olimpic against Parma; he became an athlete of national status, so that the Italian Rugby Federation delayed his transfer to the following season. Between 2003 and 2005 he played for Rome, making a total of 12 appearances in Series A games.

At the end of the season he moved to New Zealand, and was recruited by Poneke Rugby Club near Wellington. To earn his living, he began working in a restaurant, and thus developed an interest in culinary arts alongside his passion for rugby.

Returning to Italy in 2007 he played for Rovigo in the Super 10 league, and from 2008, first in Series A, then in Excellence with Lazio until a ligament injury ended his sporting career in 2011.

Meanwhile, he had trained as a chef with an international course from which had graduated in 2010.

He's been a television presenter until 2019, when he abandoned DMAX for personal reasons.

As of March 2024, Rubini is under investigation by the Public Prosecutor's Office of Rome, as suspected of incitement to racial hatred and defamation against Israel.

In May 2024, Rubini was attacked by a group of six people armed with hammers and knives, trying to blind his right eye with dozens of hits.

== TV Programs ==
- Unti e bisunti: DMAX
- Unti e bisunti 2: DMAX
- Il ricco e il povero: NOVE and DMAX
- È uno sporco lavoro: DMAX
- Camionisti in trattoria: DMAX
- Camionisti in trattoria 2: DMAX
