= Rubin (disambiguation) =

Rubin is both a surname and a given name.

Rubin may also refer to:

== Places ==
- Al-Nabi Rubin, Acre, a Palestinian village
- Vera C. Rubin Observatory, Chile, formerly the Large Synoptic Survey Telescope

== Organizations ==
- Rubin (company), a wine-making company in Serbia
- Rubin Design Bureau, a Russian submarine designer center
- FC Rubin Kazan, a Russian football club, based in the city of Kazan (Tatarstan republic)

== Other uses ==
- Benedict–Webb–Rubin equation
- Soyuz 1, a Soviet spaceflight that used the call sign "Rubin"
- Vera Rubin Early Career Prize (Rubin Prize), an award given by the American Astronomical Society
- Rubin – microarchitecture for graphics processing units (GPUs) by Nvidia

== See also ==
- Reuben (disambiguation)
- Schmidt–Rubin, a series of Swiss Army service rifles
