= Rubenis =

Family name

Origin
- Origin: Latvian
- Meaning: "black grouse"

Rubenis (feminine: Rubene) is a Latvian surname, derived from the Latvian word for "black grouse". Individuals with the surname include:

- Vitālijs Rubenis (born 1914), Latvian communist politician, former chairman of the Soviet of Nationalities
- Juris Rubenis (born 1961), Lutheran pastor;
- Mārtiņš Rubenis (born 1978), luger
- Artūrs Visockis-Rubenis (born 1985). basketball coach
