= Majlis al-Shura =

Islamic advisory council

In Arab culture, a Majlis al-Shura or Majlis-ash-Shura (Arabic: مجلس الشورى; Shura council in English) is an advisory council or consultative council. In Islamic context, a Majlis-ash-Shura is one of two ways that a khalifa (Islamic leader) may be selected, the other way being by nomination.

The noun شورى (shura), alone, means "consultation" and refers to (among other things) a topic in Islamic law or sharia; see shura. Combined with the term majlis, مجلس, which refers to a council or legislature, it is meant to indicate a body of individuals who advise, consult, or determine.

== Political ==
Majlis al-Shura is a commonly used term for elected or co-opted assemblies with advisory or legislative powers in Arabic-speaking or Islamic-majority countries. In countries with bicameral national legislatures, the appellation is given to either the full legislative body or to the upper house; in the case where the government does not function on a democratic basis, the legislature's powers are often restricted exclusively to consultation.

- It is the official Arabic name of the Consultative Assembly of Saudi Arabia (the closest thing Saudi Arabia has to a legislature); also the quasi-legislature of Oman and that of Qatar.
- The name of the Parliament of Pakistan.
- The name of the upper house of parliament in Bahrain.
- As Majles-e Shura-ye Eslami, the full name of the unicameral parliament of Iran.
- A quasi-legislative body within the al-Qaeda militant organization.
- The name of the upper house of Yemen.
- The former name of Senate of Egypt.
- A quasi-legislative body of the Islamic State.
- The supreme policy-making council of the Islamic Movement in Israel.

=== Council membership ===
There are no strict guidelines as to who can become part of the Majlis-ash-Shura. However, adulthood (in Islam, anyone who has reached puberty), a sound mind, and strong knowledge of Islam are the most agreed-upon prerequisites. Even these conditions are not completely agreed upon, as in the case of the scholar Faiyadh, who wrote that experts in various non-Islamic fields like economics, engineering, and medicine are also qualified.

== Caliphate ==
Traditional Sunni Islamic lawyers agree that shura, loosely translated as 'consultation of the people', is a function of the Caliphate. The Majlis ash-Shura advise the caliph. The importance of this is premised by the following verses of the Qur'an:

... those who answer the call of their Lord and establish the prayer, and who conduct their affairs by Shura.^{[42:38]}

... consult them in their affairs. Then when you have taken a decision, put your trust in Allah^{[3:159]}

The majlis is also the means to elect a new caliph. Al-Mawardi has written that members of the majlis should satisfy three conditions: they must be just, they must have enough knowledge to distinguish a good caliph from a bad one, and must have sufficient wisdom and judgment to select the best caliph. Al-Mawardi also said in emergencies when there is no caliphate and no majlis, the people themselves should create a majlis, select a list of candidates for caliph, then the majlis should select from the list of candidates. Some modern interpretations of the role of the Majlis ash-Shura include those by Islamist author Sayyid Qutb and by Taqi al-Din al-Nabhani, the founder of a transnational political movement devoted to the revival of the Caliphate. In an analysis of the shura chapter of the Qur'an, Qutb argued Islam requires only that the ruler consult with at least some of the ruled (usually the elite), within the general context of God-made laws that the ruler must execute. Taqi al-Din al-Nabhani, writes that Shura is important and part of "the ruling structure" of the Islamic caliphate, "but not one of its pillars," and may be neglected without the Caliphate's rule becoming unIslamic. Non-Muslims may serve in the majlis, though they may not vote or serve as an official.

=== Conditions ===
Five conditions must be met before the Majlis-ash-Shura can select a new Khalifa:

1. There must be no Khalifa at the moment.
2. The selected person must accept the nomination.
3. The nominee must have been selected without pressure having been exerted upon the Majlis-ash-Shura.
4. The Majlis-ash-Shura must give the person their bay'a (pledge of allegiance).
5. The general populace must give the person their bay'a.

The most common condition for selecting a candidate being that there can be no objection (supported by evidence) to the candidate. Scholars, however, disagree on the number of votes there need to be for a candidate to be further considered. The number varies from two, to at least forty, to the majority of the Majlis-ash-Shura.

The Majlis-ash-Shura has the authority to remove a Khalifa if he behaves contrary to Islam's Akhlaq (practice of morality). In effect, removal is only expected in cases of oppression, and the Majlis-ash-Shura is to discreetly inform the Khalifa of his problematic actions beforehand.

=== Accountability of rulers ===
Sunni Islamic lawyers have commented on when it is permissible to disobey, impeach or remove rulers in the Caliphate. This is usually when the rulers are not meeting public responsibilities obliged upon them under Islam.

Al-Mawardi said that if the rulers meet their Islamic responsibilities to the public, the people must obey their laws, but if they become either unjust or severely ineffective then the caliph or ruler must be impeached via the Majlis al-Shura. Similarly Al-Baghdadi believed that if the rulers do not uphold justice, the ummah via the majlis should give warning to them, and if unheeded then the Caliph can be impeached. Al-Juwayni argued that Islam is the goal of the ummah, so any ruler that deviates from this goal must be impeached. Al-Ghazali believed that oppression by a caliph is enough for impeachment. Rather than just relying on impeachment, Ibn Hajar al-Asqalani obliged rebellion upon the people if the caliph began to act with no regard for Islamic law. Ibn Hajar al-Asqalani said that to ignore such a situation is haraam, and those who cannot revolt inside the caliphate should launch a struggle from outside. Al-Asqalani used two ayahs from the Qur'an to justify this:

And they (the sinners on qiyama) will say, 'Our Lord! We obeyed our leaders and our chiefs, and they misled us from the right path. Our Lord! Give them (the leaders) double the punishment you give us and curse them with a very great curse'...^{[33:67–68]}

Islamic lawyers commented that when the rulers refuse to step down via successful impeachment through the Majlis, becoming dictators through the support of a corrupt army, if the majority agree they have the option to launch a revolution against them. Many noted that this option is only exercised after factoring in the potential cost of life.

=== Rule of law ===
The following hadith establishes the principle of rule of law in relation to nepotism and accountability:

Narrated 'Aisha: The people of Quraish worried about the lady from Bani Makhzum who had committed theft. They asked, "Who will intercede for her with Allah's Apostle?" Some said, "No one dare to do so except Usama bin Zaid the beloved one to Allah's Apostle." When Usama spoke about that to Allah's Apostle Allah's Apostle said: "Do you try to intercede for somebody in a case connected with Allah's Prescribed Punishments?" Then he got up and delivered a sermon saying, "What destroyed the nations preceding you, was that if a noble amongst them stole, they would forgive him, and if a poor person amongst them stole, they would inflict Allah's Legal punishment on him. By Allah, if Fatima, the daughter of Muhammad (my daughter) stole, I would cut off her hand."

Various Islamic lawyers do however place multiple conditions, and stipulations e.g. the poor cannot be penalised for stealing out of poverty, before executing such a law, making it very difficult to reach such a stage. It is well known during a time of drought in the Rashidun caliphate period, capital punishments were suspended until the effects of the drought passed.

Islamic jurists later formulated the concept of the rule of law, the equal subjection of all classes to the ordinary law of the land, where no person is above the law and where officials and private citizens are under a duty to obey the same law. A Qadi (Islamic judge) was also not allowed to discriminate on the grounds of religion, race, colour, kinship or prejudice. There were also a number of cases where Caliphs had to appear before judges as they prepared to take their verdict.

According to Noah Feldman, a law professor at Harvard University, the legal scholars and jurists who once upheld the rule of law were replaced by a law governed by the state due to the codification of Sharia by the Ottoman Empire in the early 19th century.
