= Ralph Rubino =

American jazz musician

Ralph Rubino playing the saxophone

Ralph Rubino was a professional saxophone player born in West Haven, Connecticut and graduate of the Berklee College of Music.

Ralph had worked with The Glenn Miller Band, The Tommy Dorsey Band, Buddy Morrow Band and the Buddy Rich Band (10 nites). He travelled with Little Richard, Otis Redding, Wilson Pickett, Joe Tex, Sam & Dave, Bobby Rydell, Mitch Ryder, Wayne Cochran, Frankie Avalon, Chubby Checker, The Righteous Brothers, Frankie Valli, Bobby Vinton and recorded with The Five Satins. Ralph was a member of the Rock & Roll Hall of Fame. He was also a retired member of music unions 234/486 New Haven, Connecticut and 149 Toronto, Canada. As a member of ACTRA in Canada, "Alliance of Canadian, Television, Recording Artists" Ralph has worked in film with such distinguished actors as Marlon Brando, Al Pacino. Nicolas Cage, Charles Bronson, Loni Anderson, Debra Winger, Margot Kidder, Ted Danson, Steve Guttenberg, Brian Browne, Wilford Brimley, Robert Urich, Ellen Barkin, Gianni Russo, Bert Parks, Suzanne Somers, McKenzie Brothers, Dan Aykroyd, Alan Alda, Matthew Broderick, John Candy, Chris Farley, Robert Hayes, John Marley and Kathleen Turner, among many others. He was also a member of Variety, the Children's Charity.

Ralph died in 2016.
