= Rubens Vieira =

Brazilian politician (born 1977)

Member of the Chamber of Deputies
- Incumbent
- Assumed office 1 February 2023
- Constituency: Piauí

Personal details
- Born: 12 March 1977 (age 49)
- Party: Workers' Party (since 2022)

Rubens de Sousa Vieira (born 12 March 1977) is a Brazilian politician serving as a member of the Legislative Assembly of Piauí since 2023. From 2013 to 2020, he served as mayor of Cocal.
