= Mario Ruben =

German chemist (born 1968)

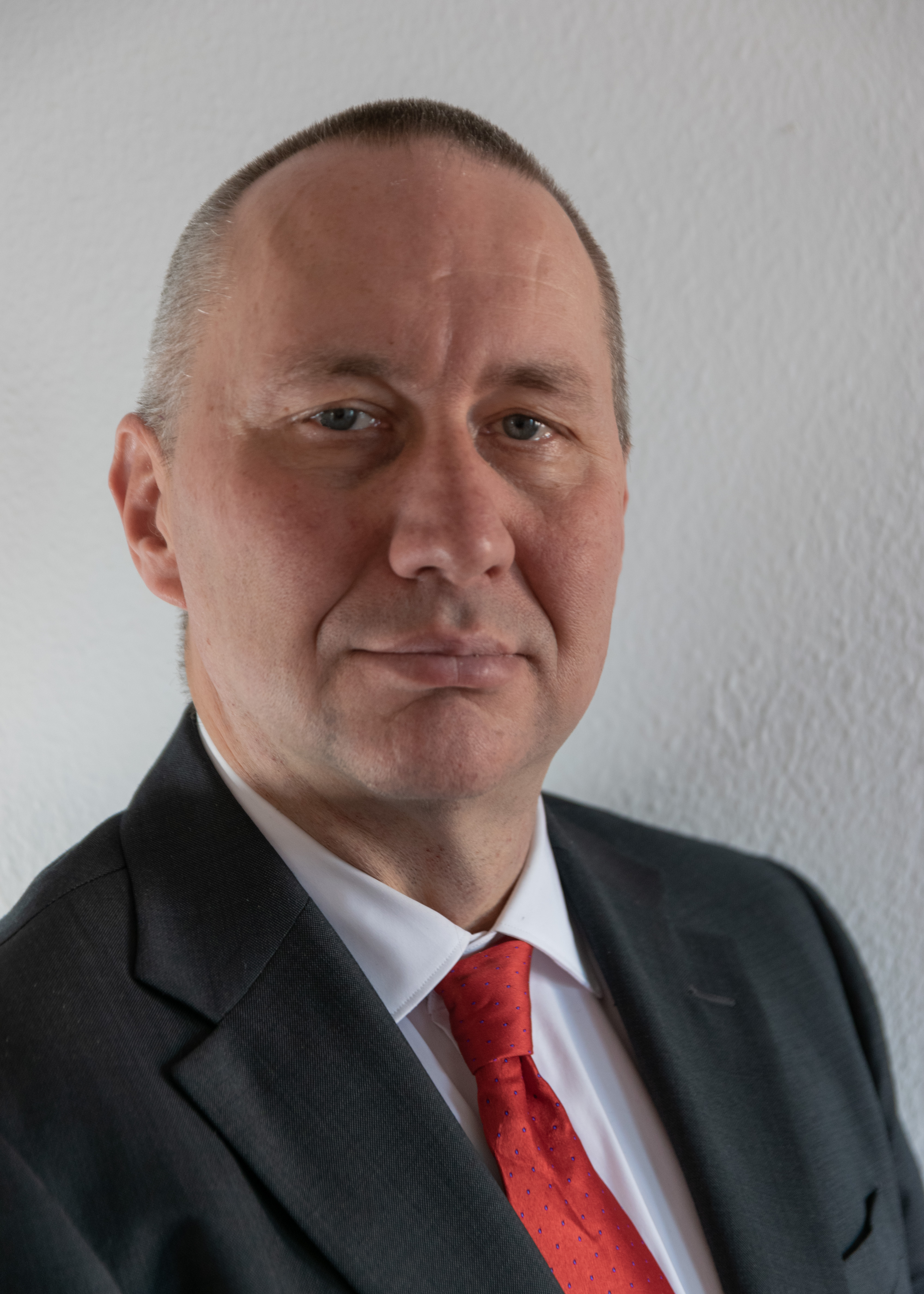
Mario Ruben in 2020

Mario Ruben (born 5 May 1968 in Rudolstadt, Germany) is a German chemist and university professor. Since 2013 he holds the research unit chair "Molecular Materials" and is director at the Karlsruhe Institute of Technology and at the University of Strasbourg.

== Life ==
Mario Ruben studied chemistry from 1989 to 1994 at the Friedrich-Schiller-University Jena. In 1998, he obtained his PhD as fellow of the Studienstiftung des Deutschen Volkes with a work entitled Homo– and Heteronuclear Mg-Carbamato–Complexes for CO_{2}–Activation at the Friedrich-Schiller-University Jena in the research group of Prof. Dr. Dirk Walther. Afterwards, he completed a two-years research stay as DAAD-fellow at the University of Strasbourg in the research group of Nobel laureate Jean-Marie Lehn, where he habilitated in 2005 with a work on Functional (Supra)Molecular Nanostructures.

In 2012 he received a call to join the Faculty of Physics at the University of Münster, Germany, which he declined to accept a W3 Full Professor position at the Faculty of Chemistry and Biology at the Karlsruhe Institute of Technology. In 2026, he received the European Research Council Advanced Grant.

As of 2026, Ruben has 371 published works according to ORCID and an h-index of 81 according to Google Scholar.

Switchable Fe_{4}-molecule

== Research topics ==
- CO_{2}-activation and –transformation
- Implementation of quantum algorithms in molecules
- Molecular battery materials
- Switchable magnetic compounds
- Optically detected nuclear magnetic resonance

== Publications (selection) ==
- with C. Molina-Jiron, C. M. Reda, C. N. S Kumar, C. Kübel. L. Velasco, H. Hahn, E. Pineda-Moreno: Direct Conversion of CO_{2} to Multi-Layer Graphene using Copper-Palladium Alloys. In: ChemSusChem. Vol. 12, 2019, Nr. 15, p. 3509 – 3514.
- with W. Wernsdorfer: Synthetic Hilbert Space Engineering of Molecular Qudits: Isotopologue Chemistry. In: Advanced Materials. Vol. 31, 2019, p. 1806687.
- with Z. Chen, P. Gao, W. Wan, S. Klyatskaya, Z. Zhao-Karger, C. Kübel, O. Fuhr, M. Fichtner: A Lithium-Free Energy Storage Device based on an Alkyne-Substituted-Porphyrin Complex. In: ChemSusChem. Vol. 12, Nr. 16, 2019, p. 3737-3741.
- with B. Schäfer, J.-F. Greisch, I. Faus, T. Bodenstein, I. Šalitroš, O. Fuhr, K. Fink, V. Schünemann, M. M. Kappes: Divergent Coordination Chemistry: Parallel Synthesis of [2×2] Iron(II) Grid-Complex Tauto-Conformers. In: Angewandte Chemie Internationale Edition. Vol. 55, 2019, p. 10881–10885.
- with S. Thiele, F. Balestro, R. Ballou, S. Klyatskaya, W. Wernsdorfer: Electrically driven nuclear spin resonance in single–molecule magnets. In Science 344, 2014, p. 1135–1138.
- with R. Vincent, S. Klyatskaya, W. Wernsdorfer, F. Balestro: Electronic read–out of a single nuclear spin using a molecular spin–transistor. In Nature 488, 2012, p. 357–360.
- with S. Kuppusamy; D. Serrano; A.M. Nonat, B. Heinrich; L. Karmazin; L.J. Charbonnière; Ph. Goldner: Optical spin-state polarization in a binuclear europium complex towards molecule-based coherent light-spin interfaces. Nature Communs. Vol. 12, 2021, P. 2152, DOI:10.1038/s41467-021-22383-x
- with D. Serrano; S. Kuppusamy; B. Heinrich; O. Fuhr; D. Hunger; Ph. Goldner: Ultra-narrow optical linewidths in rare-earth molecular crystals. Nature Vol. 603, 2022, P. 241–246, DOI:110.1038/s41586-021-04316-2
- with E. Vasilenko; V. Unni Chorakkunnath; J. Resch; N. Jobbitt; D. Serrano; P. Goldner; S. K. Kuppusamy; D. Hunger: Optically detected nuclear magnetic resonance of coherent spins in a molecular complex. Nature Materials, 2026, 1-6. DOI:10.1038/s41563-026-02539-0
