= Rubini =

Rubini is a surname of Italian origin. Notable people with the surname include:

- Cesare Rubini, Italian basketball player
- Gabriele Rubini, Italian television presenter
- Giambattista Rubini, Italian Catholic cardinal
- Giovanni Battista Rubini, Italian tenor
- Giulia Rubini, Italian actress
- Jan Rubini, Swedish-American violinist and conductor
- Michel Rubini, American musician and composer (son of Jan Rubini)
- Olinto Sampaio Rubini, Brazilian footballer
- Sergio Rubini, Italian actor and film director

== See also ==
- Rubini (song), 2021 song by Mahmood and Elisa
- Rupini
- Nouriel Roubini
