= Civni apple =

Apple cultivar marketed as "Rubens"

Malus domestica 'Civni'
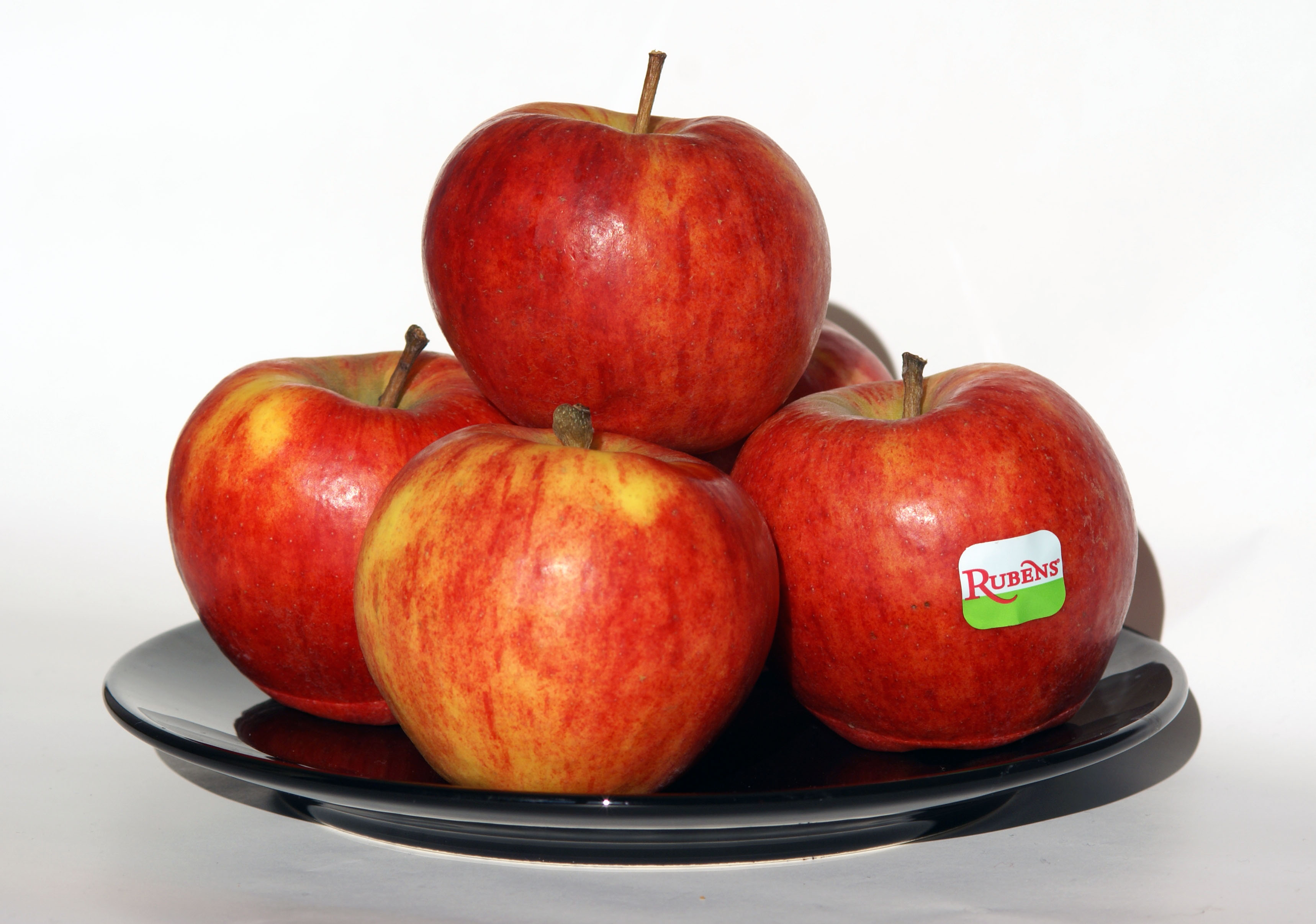
- Hybrid parentage: 'Elstar' × 'Gala'
- Cultivar: 'Civni'
- Origin: Italy 1985

Civni is an apple cultivar marketed as the Rubens apple. The Civni apple is a bicolored apple. It was first developed in 1985 as a cross of 'Gala' and 'Elstar' apples by the Consorzio Italiano Vivaisti (CIV), an Italian apple growers' consortium from Ferrara. They were granted a patent on the 'Civni' variety in 2003.

The apple has a striking, striped or solid, light red color. Its taste is sweet like that of 'Gala', but more aromatic; its texture is more solid and crunchy than that of 'Elstar'.

As of 2007, the apple was grown on about a million trees in Europe, as well as in Chile, South Africa, and the United States. It has a yield between 80 and 100 tonnes per hectare. The 'Civni' cultivar is not to be confused with the Dutch "Rubens" apple, which is a cross of 'Cox's Orange Pippin' and 'Reinette étoilée'.
