= Rubins (surname) =

Rubins or Rubīns is a surname, and may refer to:

- Andrejs Rubins (1978–2022), Latvian footballer
- Kristiāns Rubīns (born 1997), Latvian ice hockey player
- David K. Rubins (1902–1985), American sculptor
- Elmārs Rubīns, Soviet rower
- Kathleen Rubins (born 1978), American microbiologist and NASA astronaut
- Nancy Rubins (born 1952), American artist

== See also ==
- Rubin (surname)
- Rubens (surname)
