= Reuven Elbaz =

Israeli rabbi

Rabbi Reuven Elbaz ראובן אלבז
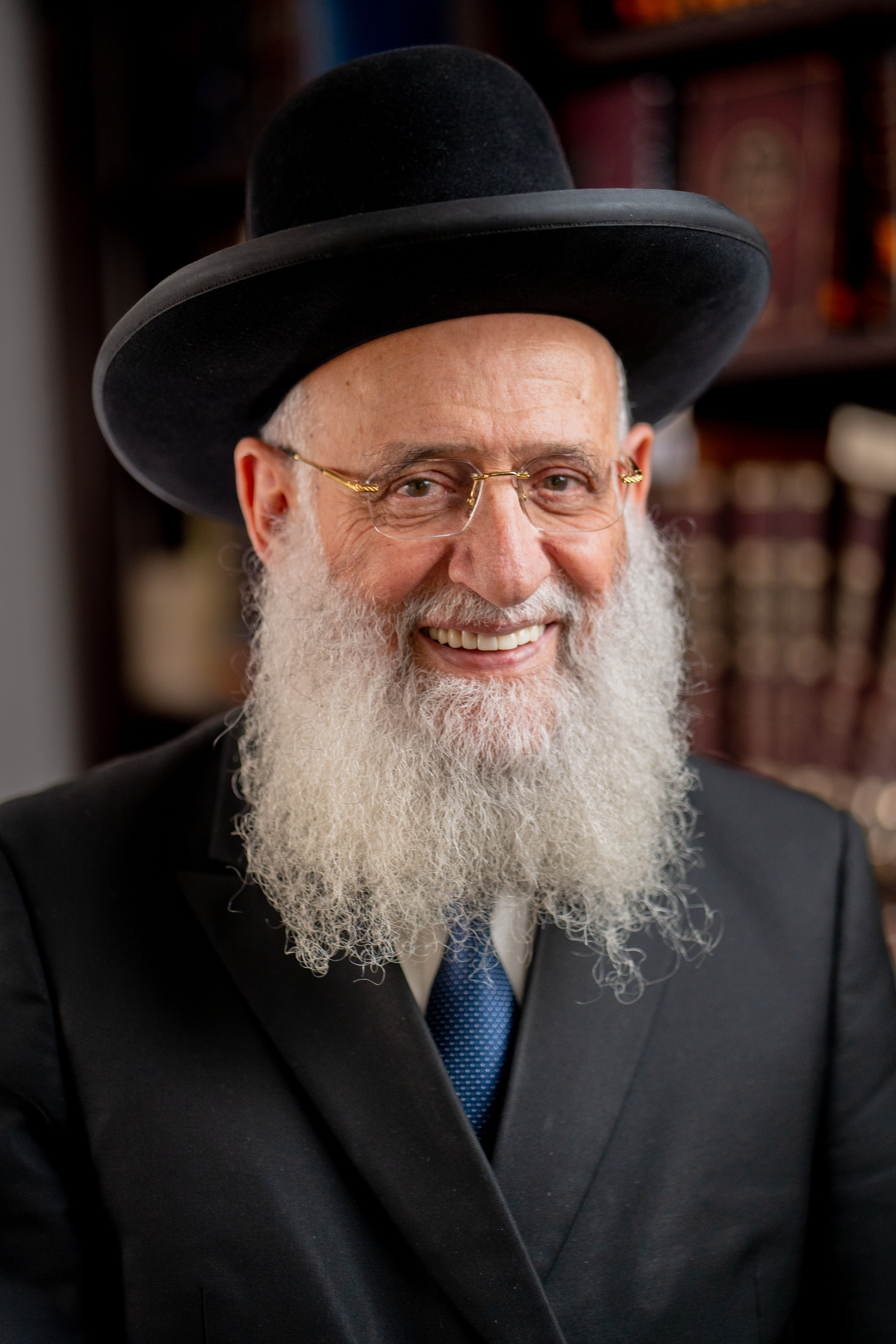

Personal life
- Born: Reuven Elbaz; 1944 (age 81–82) Fez, French protectorate in Morocco

Religious life
- Religion: Judaism
- Yeshiva: Yeshivat Ohr Hachaim
- Position: Rosh yeshiva
- Began: 1968
- Other: Member, Moetzet Chachmei HaTorah

Rabbi Reuven Elbaz (Hebrew: ראובן אלבז; born 1944) is a Sephardi Haredi rabbi, rosh yeshiva, and a leader of the baal teshuva movement among Sephardi and Mizrahi Jews in Israel. He is the founder and head of the Ohr Hachaim network of institutions, which operates educational, humanitarian, prison, and drug rehabilitation programs in 350 branches across Israel. He is also the founder and dean of Yeshivat Ohr Hachaim in Jerusalem, which enrolls more than 500 students. He is a senior member of the Moetzet Chachmei HaTorah of the Shas political party.

== Early life and education ==
Elbaz was born in 1944 in Fez, Morocco. He learned both religious and general studies in a local Talmud Torah. At the age of 11, he made aliyah to Israel with other youths and studied in a school run by Poalei Agudat Yisrael. The school sponsored a communal bar mitzvah for him and his classmates. His parents made aliyah a few years later and settled in Tiberias.

After his bar mitzvah, Elbaz transferred to Yeshivas Tiferes Yisrael in Haifa. Three years later he enrolled at the yeshiva of Magdiel, then headed by Rabbi Nachum Lasman, a student of Rabbi Boruch Ber Leibowitz. Elbaz later studied at the Novardok yeshiva in Jerusalem under Rabbi Ben Tzion Bruk.

Following his marriage to the daughter of Rabbi Shmuel Zakai, Elbaz began studying in Metivta HaRashal under Rabbi Ovadia Yosef. He earned rabbinic ordination and was certified as a dayan (rabbinic judge). In 1969, at the age of 25, he was named Rav of the Beit Yisrael neighborhood in Jerusalem.

== Leader of baal teshuva movement ==
In those days, Rabbanim stayed in a shul or a beis medrash where they delivered shiurim and issued halachic rulings. Obviously, the younger generation wasn't present at those shiurim. I decided to do something different and go to the places where the youth were hanging out.

— Rabbi Reuven Elbaz

After the Six-Day War, Israeli and American Jews experienced a religious awakening, leading to the establishment of yeshivas and programs aimed at baalei teshuva (returnees to the faith). In the 1970s, Elbaz and Rabbi Amnon Yitzhak became the leaders of this movement among Sephardi and Mizrahi Jews in Israel. Elbaz was known to frequent pool halls and coffee shops around Jerusalem to speak with young people, and sent cars blaring religious music and messages through low-income secular neighborhoods. He would invite youth to come hear a band in a local hall and then stand up on stage to speak to them. He also traveled around the country, from the Golan Heights in the north to Eilat in the south, to meet with young secular Jews in the entertainment venues they frequented and talk with them about religion. Beginning in the 1970s, Elbaz worked with young Sephardi Jews involved in crime, encouraging them to return to mitzvah observance, and was also asked by government officials to speak with parolees.

Elbaz's religious outreach efforts led him to establish the Ohr Hachaim network, which operates yeshivas, synagogues, study halls, schools, child care centers, professional training seminars, soup kitchens, gemachim, programs in prisons, nursing homes and hospitals, and drug rehabilitation centers across Israel. The network founded religious schools in cities that had been "written off" as lost causes for Torah observance, including Beit Shemesh, Tel Aviv, Kiryat Gat, Bnei Ayish, Ofakim, Sderot, Hatzor HaGlilit, and Beit She'an. The network also operates a crisis hotline and provides medical consultations and referrals. As of 2014, the network has 350 branches across Israel. Elbaz named his organization after Rabbi Chaim ibn Attar (1696–1743), author of the Ohr Hachaim commentary on the Torah, as Elbaz identified with the outreach work that the Ohr Hachaim did among the Sephardi population in his native Morocco and in Livorno, Italy, en route to the Land of Israel.

=== Yeshivat Ohr Hachaim ===
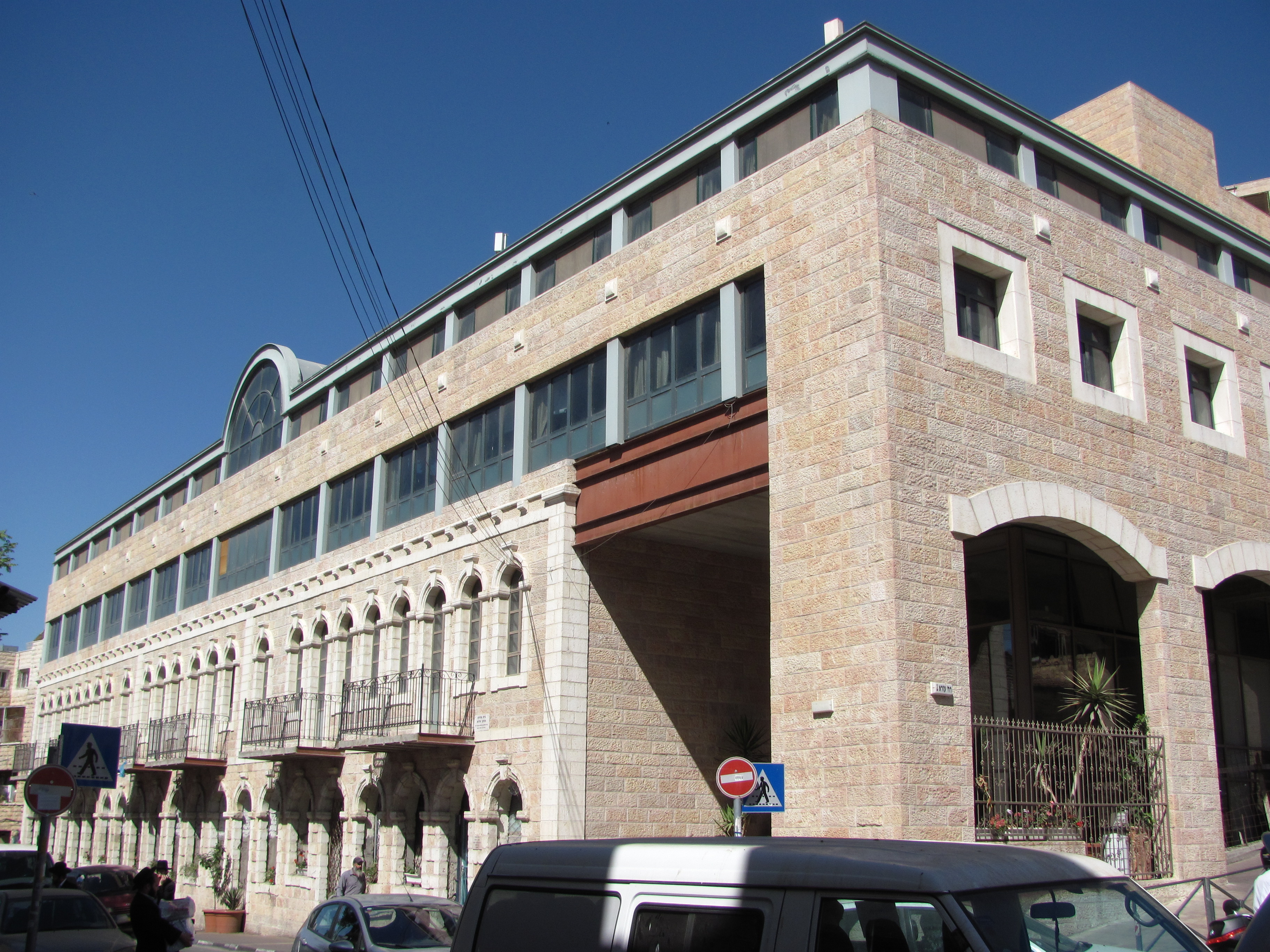
Front entrance of Yeshivat Ohr Hachaim

In 1968 Elbaz founded a baal teshuva yeshiva called Yeshivat Ohr Hachaim. The yeshiva opened in a two-room apartment in Jerusalem with an enrollment of 14 boys. Elbaz later acquired a large parcel of land in the Bukharim Quarter of the city and built a "towering" campus which opened sometime in the 2010s. The 16,000 m^{2} (170,000 sq ft) facility can accommodate up to 20,000 people. As of 2019, Yeshivat Ohr Hachaim has more than 350 undergraduates and nearly 200 avreichim (married students) learning on its campus. Elbaz gives regular shiurim to the various levels, teaching Talmud, halakhah, and mussar (ethics).

Besides its educational program, Yeshivat Ohr Hachaim is known for the huge attendance it garners for its nightly Selichot prayers in Elul, the Hebrew month preceding Rosh Hashana. While nightly Selichot prayers during Elul are a Sephardi custom, the prayer sessions at Yeshivat Ohr Hachaim attract thousands of visitors, including secular youth, yeshiva students, married students, women, and girls from all religious streams. On one night in 2014, hundreds of Israeli Air Force officers and soldiers came to the yeshivah to participate in the Selichot prayers and also hear a special shiur from Elbaz. In 2018, the Belzer Rebbe, Rabbi Yissachar Dov Rokeach, attended one of the Selichot sessions accompanied by a group of his Hasidim. The Kikar HaShabbat website carries a live broadcast of the Selichot prayers as well.

== Other activities ==
Elbaz is a popular lecturer at public gatherings in Israel, especially those for secular and baal teshuvah audiences. He has been described as "a charismatic and warm personality who can relate easily to non-religious people and make them feel comfortable and at ease". He is accepted by Sephardi and Ashkenazi Haredim as well. He gives a regular Tuesday-night shiur to a mixed audience of Torah scholars and baalebatim (working men), and speaks weekly on a radio program.

In advance of Passover 2015, Elbaz established Badatz Ohr HaHidur kosher certification agency, affixing his hechsher to matzot. A few months later, he added poultry products and the four species for Sukkot to his certification program.

In 2015, Elbaz was invited to join the Moetzet Chachmei HaTorah of the Shas political party.

== Bribery conviction ==
In 2004, Elbaz was implicated in a bribery case involving then-Minister of Knesset Shlomo Benizri of the Shas party. In April 2008, Elbaz received a suspended sentence of eight months and a 120,000 NIS fine for "facilitating and accepting bribes and conspiracy to commit fraud". Elbaz filed an appeal to the Supreme Court of Israel, which ordered the fine increased to 250,000 NIS. Notwithstanding the conviction, Elbaz continues to maintain his innocence.

== Personal life ==
In 2012, Forbes Israel ranked Elbaz as one of the top 10 wealthiest rabbis in Israel, with personal wealth estimated at 40 million NIS.

== Works ==
Shiurim (Torah lectures) by Elbaz are available online on beinenu.com. His derashot (commentaries) on the Torah have been collected into multi-volume sets under the series name Moshcheni Acharecha, published by Yefe Nof:

- Moshcheni Acharecha al Beresheet
- Moshcheni Acharecha al Shemot
- Moshcheni Acharecha al Vayikra
- Moshcheni Acharecha al Bamidbar
- Moshcheni Acharecha al Devarim

== Sources ==
- Golan, Yvonne Kozlovsky (2019). Site of Amnesia: The Lost Historical Consciousness of Mizrahi Jewry. BRILL. ISBN 9789004395626.
- Lehmann, David; Siebzehner, Batia (2011). "Corporatism and multiculturalism as responses to ethnic claims and socio-economic inequality: the case of Shas". In Ben-Porat, Guy; Turner, Bryan S. (eds.). The Contradictions of Israeli Citizenship: Land, Religion and State. Taylor & Francis. ISBN 9781136727382.
