= Brent David Ruben =

American academic (born 1944)

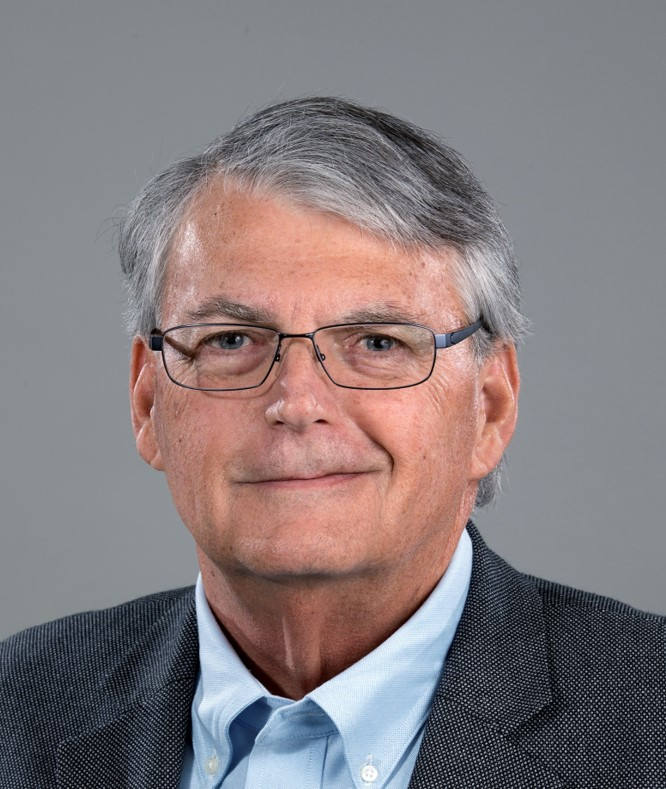
- Brent David Ruben
- Born: October 17, 1944 (age 81); Cedar Rapids, Iowa, U.S.
- Education: Theodore Roosevelt High School (1962); University of Iowa (M.A. 1968) (Ph.D 1970)
- Employer: Rutgers University
- Title: Distinguished Professor; Senior University Fellow, and Founding Executive Director, Center for Organizational Leadership
- Spouse: Jann M. Ruben
- Children: Robbi Ruben Urm; Marc D. Ruben
- Parents: Nate Ruben (father); Ruth Subotnik Ruben (mother)

Brent David Ruben (born October 17, 1944) is an American academic, and Distinguished Professor of Communication, Department of Communication, Rutgers School of Communication and Information. He also serves as Advisor for Strategy and Planning in the Office to the Executive Vice President for Academic Affairs, is Senior University Fellow in leadership and communication, and founder of the Rutgers Center for Organizational Leadership. Ruben is a member of faculties of Robert Wood Johnson School of Medicine and the Ph.D. Program in Higher Education in the Rutgers Graduate School of Education. Ruben's academic career has been devoted to advancing interdisciplinary and systemic approaches to the study of communication, and the application of these frameworks in cross-cultural, health, educational, organizational, and leadership contexts. He is author of more than 60 books and 150 journal articles and book chapters in these areas.

== Early life and education ==
Brent was born in Cedar Rapids, Iowa, and lived in Des Moines, Iowa through his early years. Ruben attended the University of Iowa, graduating in 1966 with majors in psychology and advertising. He completed a master's degree in communication from the University of Iowa in 1968, and a Ph.D. in communication from the University of Iowa in 1970.

== Career ==
=== University of Iowa – School of Journalism and Mass Communication ===
After receiving his Ph.D., Ruben was promoted from Instructor to a tenure-track Assistant Professor position. His primary focus was on communication education, experiential instruction, and the development and implementation of Intermedia, a year-long theory-based experiential program for communication and mass communication instruction.

=== Rutgers University – Department of Communication ===
Ruben served as assistant department chair from 1976 to 1980. He was promoted to Associate Professor in 1980, and was appointed chair in that same year, a position in which he served until 1984. By the end of his tenure as chair, the department had grown in size and scope, with 18 full-time faculty and staff, and 800 majors with 6,000 student enrollments per year in interpersonal, intercultural, organizational, international, health, speech and mass communication.

Consistent with his curricular and administrative work within the department during those years, Ruben's scholarship and publication focused on general systems theory (General System Theory and Human Communication, with J. Kim, 1975), and other interdisciplinary conceptualizations of communication.

Ruben's interest in integration of the multidisciplinary theories of communication led to the publication of a work entitled, Approaches to Human Communication (With R. Budd), which was created for use as the introductory text at Rutgers and was also adopted at a number of other departments of communication nationally. Approaches to Human Communication provided a broad perspective on the field exploring 24 disciplinary orientations to communication from Anthropology to Zoology. In 1984, Ruben authored Communication and Human Behavior (CHB) to provide an integrated, interdisciplinary book on the role of communication in human affairs. In 2020, the 7th edition was published, with coauthor L. Stewart.

=== Rutgers University – Center for Organizational Leadership ===
In 1993, Ruben was asked by the Rutgers President to establish a university-wide initiative in Organizational Quality and Communication Improvement (now called the Rutgers Center for Organizational Leadership—(OL). The center was created to provide professional consultation and programming for the university in the areas of organizational leadership, assessment, communication, planning, and development. Ruben led in the formation of resource-sharing partnerships between Rutgers and Johnson & Johnson and Rutgers and AT&T, and under his leadership, a number of books, and articles, and professional development materials were developed to apply concepts of organizational and leadership studies and best practices from business and healthcare to the higher education context.

The Rutgers Center played a lead role in creating a national consortium to encourage networking and facilitate collaboration and learning across institutions. Other institutions involved in this effort included the University of California-Berkeley, Cornell University, the University of Missouri-Rolla, Penn State University, and the University of Wisconsin-Madison. Ruben became the first president of the organization—now named the Network for Change and Continuous Innovation (NCCI) dedicated to this work. NCCI now has approximately 100 member institutions.

=== Honors and special projects ===
In 2018, Ruben was named the first recipient of The Baldrige Foundation National Leadership Excellence Award for Education for his accomplishments in advancing the Malcolm Baldrige organizational excellence philosophy within higher education. Ruben has received numerous awards in recognition of his scholarly and professional leadership, including the National Communication Association Gerald Phillips Award (2004), the Rutgers University Daniel Gorenstein Award (2000), the National Association for College and University Business Officers (NACUBO) Professional Development Award (2003), and the U.S.A. Higher Education Quality Pioneer Award. He was also the first recipient of the Brent D. Ruben Leadership Award, created in his honor in 2006 and awarded annually by the National Consortium for Change and Continuous Innovation in Higher Education (NCCI) to recognize distinguished contributors to higher education.

As executive director of the Center for Leadership, Ruben led in the development of a number of research and training programs including: The Rutgers Leadership Academy, Academic Leadership Programs for Rutgers - New Brunswick, and Rutgers Biomedical and Health Sciences (2017-), The Leaders of Tomorrow Program - AT&T Foundation (2001–2002), Rutgers-Johnson & Johnson Knowledge Networking Group (2001–2004), Rutgers-AT&T organizational partnership (1993–2001), and the Kellogg Foundation (2000–2003) Mid-Atlantic Regional Academic Leadership Development Institute.

Ruben also served as a member of the U.S. Department of Education Rule-Making Committee on Accreditation Standards (2007). He has been a Malcolm Baldrige Examiner and a member of the National Institute of Standards and Technology Education and Healthcare Baldrige Pilot Advisory and Evaluation Team. He has served as a Middle States Commission on Higher Education Accreditation Examiner (1994–97), Special Consultant to Canadian Royal Commission on Conditions of Foreign Service, Examiner and Judge for the New Jersey Performance Excellence Awards, and in various other advisory roles.

Between the years of 2013 and 2019, Ruben represented Rutgers as Liaison to the Big Ten Academic Leadership Programs with which Rutgers had become affiliated in 2013. He also served as Director, Leadership Development Program partnership developed between the Offices of the President of Botswana and Rutgers in 2018–2020. In 2022 he was appointed as a Fellow, U.S. Army Research Institute for the Behavioral and Social Sciences.

In 2020, Ruben was named Senior University Fellow, Communication and Organizational Leadership, and subsequently was named Advisor for Strategy and Planning in the Office of the Executive Vice President for Academic Affairs.

Ruben also serves as a professional consultant and advisor within Rutgers and to many colleges and universities in the United States and internationally.

=== Family and personal life ===
Ruben and his wife, Jann, married in 1967, and reside in Hillsborough, New Jersey.

== Selected publications ==
- Ruben, B. D., (2022). Implementing sustainable change in higher education; Principles and practices of collaborative leadership. Stylus.
- Ruben, B. D., De Lisi, R., Gigliotti, R. A. (2021). A guide for leaders in higher education: Core concepts, competencies, and tools, second edition, Stylus.
- Ruben, B., & Gigliotti, R. (2019). Leadership, communication, and social influence: A theory of resonance, activation, and cultivation. Emerald.
- Ruben, B. D., De Lisi, R., Gigliotti, R. A. (2017). A guide for leaders in higher education: Core concepts, competencies, and tools. Stylus.
- Gigliotti, R. A., Goldthwaite, C., Ruben, B. D. (2017). Leadership: Communication and social influence in personal and professional contexts. Kendall Hunt.
- Ruben, B.D. (2016). The excellence in higher education guide: A framework for the design, assessment, and continuous improvement of institutions, departments and program, eighth edition, Stylus.
- Calcado, A. M., Gracias, V., Ruben, B. D., St. Pierre, J, Strom, B.L. (Jan 2022). How one university harnessed internal knowledge and expertise to effectively combat the COVID-19 Pandemic. Electronic Journal of Knowledge Management, Special Issue: The University of the Future. 20(1), 1–16. https://academic publishing.org/index.php/ejkm/article/view/2439/2034
- Ruben, B. D., Gigliotti, R. A., (2021). Explaining incongruities between leadership theory and practice: Integrating theories of resonance, communication, and systems. Leadership & OrganizationDevelopment Journal. 42(6), 942–957. https://doi.org/10.1108/LODJ-02-2021- 0072.
- Ruben, B. D. (2020). Contemporary challenges confronting colleges and universities: The Baldrige and excellence in higher education approach to institutional renewal. Chronicle of Leadership and Management, 1(1), 13–35. https://baldrigefoundation.org/what-we-do/thought- leadership/clm/ https://ol.rutgers.edu/wp-content/uploads/2021/02/RubenChronicle-of- Leadership_ Mgmt-Dec-2020.pdf
- Ruben, B. D., Gigliotti, R. A. (2017). Communication: Sine qua non of organizational leadership theory and practice. International Journal of Business Communication, 54(1), 12–30. https://journals.sagepub.com/doi/full/10.1177/2329488416675447.
- Ruben, B. D., Lewis, L., Sandmeyer, L., Russ, T., Smulowitz, S., Immordino, K. (2008). Assessing the Impact of the Spellings Commission: The Message, the Messenger, and the Dynamics of Change in Higher Education. Survey Instrument and Summary of Interview Responses. National Association of College and University Business Officers.
- Ruben, B.D., L. Stewart. (2020). Communication and human behavior, seventh edition. Kendall Hunt.
- Ruben, B. D. (2014). Communication theory and health communication practice: The more things change, the more they stay the same. Health Communication, 31(1), 1-11 http://dx.doi.org/10.1080/10410236.2014.923086.
- Ruben, B. D. (1995). Quality in higher education. Transaction/Routledge.
- Ruben, B. D. (2004). Pursuing excellence in higher education: Eight fundamental principles. Jossey-Bass; Ruben, B. D., De Lisi, R., Gigliotti. R. A. (2018).
