= Reuben's Restaurant =

Restaurant in New York City

- Menu circa 1943
- Interactive map of Reuben's Restaurant

Restaurant information
- Established: 1908
- Closed: December 2001
- Previous owners: Arnold Reuben; Harry L. Gilman
- Food type: Delicatessen
- Location: 244 Madison Avenue, New York City, New York, New York, 10016, United States
- Coordinates: 40.7501278°N 73.9814707°W

Reuben's Restaurant and Delicatessen was a restaurant and Jewish deli in Manhattan, New York City founded by Arnold Reuben.

== History ==
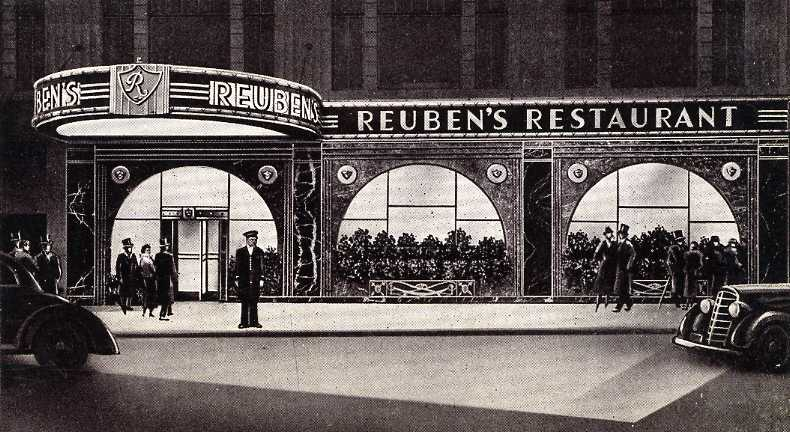
Reuben's Restaurant

Arnold Reuben was a Jewish-German immigrant who founded Reuben's Restaurant in 1908 at 802 Park Avenue. In 1916, the restaurant moved to Broadway on 73rd Street before moving again two years later to 622 Madison Avenue. Thirty years after it first opened its doors, Reuben's Restaurant and Delicatessen finally had a formal opening at 6 East 58th Street with the mayor at the time, Fiorello La Guardia, in attendance. Reuben's remained in that location until the restaurant was sold in the mid-1960s, when it moved to 38th Street and Madison Avenue. It operated at 244 Madison Avenue until 2001 when the restaurant was forced to close due to health code infractions.

Reuben's Restaurant and Delicatessen played a small part in the 1919 Black Sox scandal when the Chicago White Sox conspired to "throw" the World Series in the most widely condemned instance of illegal high stakes gambling in sports history. Abe "The Little Champ" Attell's initial attempt to sell the idea to Arnold Rothstein, the most powerful sports gambler at the time, took place in a private room inside Reuben's.

Reuben would name sandwiches after celebrities, including Dean Martin and Frank Sinatra, a gimmick used by many restaurants at the time. In 1938, Reuben was interviewed about his restaurant by the Federal Writers' Project. Arnold Reuben's son, Arnold Reuben Jr., worked in the restaurant with his father until the mid-1960s when Reuben sold the restaurant to Harry L. Gilman. Marian Burros wrote about the restaurant's appearance on January 11, 1986, in The New York Times. She said: "Italian marble, gold-leaf ceiling, lots of walnut paneling and dark red leather seats — to a small-town girl, it was the quintessential New York restaurant."

Reuben claimed credit for the recipe for New York-style cheesecake, which he said he invented in 1928. He also claimed credit for the Reuben sandwich.

== See also ==
- List of Ashkenazi Jewish restaurants
- List of delicatessens
