= Reuben =

Reuben or Reuven is a Biblical male first name from Hebrew רְאוּבֵן (Re'uven), meaning 'behold, a son'. In the Bible, Reuben was the firstborn son of Jacob.

== Variants ==
Variants include Reuvein in Yiddish or as an English variant spelling on the Hebrew original; Rúben in European Portuguese and Icelandic; Rubem or Rubens in Brazilian Portuguese; Rubén in Spanish and French; Rubèn in Catalan; Ruben in Dutch, German, Italian, Indonesian, Polish, Swedish, Norwegian, Danish, and Armenian; and Rupen/Roupen in Western Armenian.

The form Ruben can also be a form of the name Robin, itself a variation of the Germanic name Robert, in several Celtic languages. It preserves the "u" sound from the name's first component "hruod" (compare Ruairí, the Irish form of Roderick).

== People with the mononym ==
- Ruben I, Prince of Armenia (1025/1035–1095), the first lord of Armenian Cilicia or "Lord of the Mountains" from 1080/1081/1082 to 1095, founder of Rubenid dynasty
- Ruben II, Prince of Armenia (c. 1165–1170), the seventh lord of Armenian Cilicia or "Lord of the Mountains" from 1169 to 1170
- Ruben III, Prince of Armenia (1145–1187), the ninth lord of Armenian Cilicia or "Lord of the Mountains" from 1175 to 1187
- Ruben (singer), Norwegian singer-songwriter Ruben Markussen (born 1995)
- Ruben (film editor), Indian film editor Livingston Antony Ruben (born 1986)

== People with the given name ==
=== Reuben ===
- Reuben Agboola (born 1962), Nigerian football player
- Reuben Bennett (1913–1989), Scottish football player and coach
- Reuben Efron (1911–1993), Lithuanian-American CIA officer
- Reuben Fatheree II (born 2002), American football player
- Reuben Fenton (1819–1885), American merchant and politician from New York
- Reuben Fine (1914–1993), American chess player and psychologist
- Reuben Fink (1889–1961), Ukrainian-American Yiddish writer
- Reuben Foster (born 1994), American football player
- Reuben Garrick (born 1997), Australian rugby league player
- Rube Goldberg (Reuben) (1883–1970), American cartoonist and creator of Rube Goldberg devices
- Reuben Hazell (born 1979), English football player
- Reuben James (c. 1776 – 1838), US Navy boatswain's mate
- Reuben Lowery (born 2002), American football player
- Reuben Mattus (1912–1994), Polish businessman
- Reuben Mednikoff (1906–1972), British surrealist artist
- Reuben Moon (1847-1919), American politician
- Reuben Noble-Lazarus (born 1993), English football player
- Reuben Oppenheimer (1897–1982), justice of the Maryland Court of Appeals
- Reuben Partridge (1823–1900), American pioneer bridge builder
- Reuben Reid (born 1988), English football player
- Reuben W. Robins (1883–1949), justice of the Arkansas Supreme Court
- Reuben Snake (1937–1993), Ho-Chunk (Winnebago) activist, educator, spiritual leader, and tribal leader
- Reuben Sturman (1924–1997), American pornographer and businessman from Ohio
- Reuben Thorne (born 1975), New Zealand rugby player
- Reuben Wu (born 1975), English photographer, director, music producer, member of the band Ladytron

=== Ruben ===
- Ruben Amorim (born 1985), Portuguese football manager
- Ruben Oskar Auervaara (1906–1964), Finnish thief and fraudster
- Ruben Bemelmans (born 1988), Belgian tennis player
- Ruben Cain, birth name of Robert Gibson (wrestler) (born 1958), American professional wrestler
- Ruben Castillo (boxer) (1957–2026), American boxer
- Ruben Darbinyan (1883–1968), Armenian politician and activist and government minister during the First Republic of Armenia
- Ruben Douglas (born 1979), Panamanian basketball player
- Ruben Enaje, Filipino carpenter and sign painter, known for being voluntarily crucified annually on Good Friday
- Ruben Fleischer (born 1974), American film director and producer
- Ruben Gabrielsen (born 1992), Norwegian football player
- Ruben Gallego (born 1979), American politician
- Ruben Hein (born 1982), Dutch musician
- Ruben Houkes (born 1979), Dutch judoka
- Ruben Hyppolite II (born 2001), American football player
- Ruben Kihuen (born 1980), American politician
- Ruben Kun (1942–2014), President of Nauru (1996–1997)
- Ruben Lagus (1896–1959), Finnish general, one of the principal commanders of Lapland War
- Ruben Loftus-Cheek (born 1996), English football player
- Ruben Markussen (born 1995), aka Ruben (singer), Norwegian singer-songwriter
- Ruben Müller (born 2005), German footballer
- Ruben Nicolai (born 1975), Dutch television presenter and comedian
- Ruben Nirvi (1905–1986), Finnish linguist and professor
- Ruben Östlund (born 1974), Swedish film director, producer and screenplay writer
- Ruben Rausing (1895–1983), founder of the food packaging company Tetra Pak
- Ruben Sevak, or Rupen Sevag, real name Ruben Çilingiryan (1886–1915), Ottoman Armenian poet, prose-writer, and doctor, killed by Turkish authorities during the Armenian Genocide
- Ruben Studdard (born 1978), American singer, winner of American Idol season 2
- Ruben Trumpelmann (born 1998), South African-born Namibian cricketer
- Ruben Vargas (born 1998), Swiss football player
- Ruben Wiki (born 1973), New Zealand rugby player
- Ruben Yesayan (1946–2026), Russian-Armenian test pilot
- Ruben van Bommel (born 2004), Dutch footballer

=== Rubén/Rúben ===
- Rubén Aguiar (born 1956), Argentine long-distance runner
- Rubén Albarrán (born 1967), Mexican singer-songwriter, member of Café Tacuba
- Ruben de Almeida Barbeiro (born 1987), real name of Portuguese electro house music DJ and producer KURA
- Rubén Amaro Jr. (born 1965), American baseball player, manager, and coach
- Rubén Ardila (1942–2025), Colombian psychologist
- Rubén Baraja (born 1975), Spanish football manager
- Rubén Bareiro Saguier (1930–2014), Paraguayan poet and writer
- Rubén Blades (born 1948), Panamanian salsa singer, songwriter, actor, Latin jazz musician and activist
- Rubén Blanco (born 1995), Spanish professional footballer
- Rubén Callisaya (born 1961), Bolivian politician
- Rubén Castro (born 1981), Spanish football player
- Rubén Daray (born 1950), Argentine racing driver
- Rubén Darío (1867–1916), Nicaraguan poet
- Rubén de la Red (born 1985), Spanish football manager
- Rúben Dias (born 1997), Portuguese football player
- Rubén Duarte (born 1995), Spanish football player
- Rubén Espinoza (born 1961), Chilean football player
- Rubén Limardo (born 1985), Venezuelan fencer
- Rubén Maza (born 1967), Venezuelan long-distance runner
- Rubén Iván Martínez (born 1984), Spanish football player
- Rúben Neves (born 1997), Portuguese football player
- Rubén Ochandiano (born 1980), Spanish actor and director
- Rubén Rangel (born 1977), Venezuelan road racing cyclist
- Rubén Alonso Rosales (1925–2000), Salvadorian politician
- Rúben Semedo (born 1994), Portuguese football player
- Rubén Sobrino (born 1992), Spanish football player
- Rubén Sosa (born 1966), Uruguayan football player
- Rubén Tejada (born 1989), Panamanian baseball player
- Rúben Vinagre (born 1999), Portuguese football player
- Rubén Xaus (born 1978), Spanish motorcycle racer
- Rubén Yáñez (born 1993), Spanish football player

=== Rueben ===
- Rueben Bain Jr. (born 2004), American football player
- Rueben Mayes (born 1963), Canadian former American football player

== People with the surname ==
=== Reuben ===
- David and Simon Reuben, billionaire entrepreneurs in the UK
- David Reuben (author) (born 1933), American author and psychiatrist
- Gloria Reuben (born 1964), Canadian-American actress
- John Reuben (born John Reuben Zappin in 1979), American Christian hip-hop artist
- Julie Reuben (born 1960), historian interested in the role of education in American society and culture
- Scott Reuben (born 1958), disgraced American anesthesiologist and professor
- Stewart Reuben (1939–2025), British chess player, chess arbiter, and poker author
- William A. Reuben (1915 or 1916 – 2004), American journalist noted for his work on the cases of Julius and Ethel Rosenberg and of Alger Hiss

=== Rueben ===
- Hannah Rueben (born 1994), Nigerian wrestler

== Fictional characters ==
- Reuben (Lilo & Stitch), also known as Experiment 625, a character in the Lilo & Stitch franchise
- Reuben (Final Fantasy), a character from Final Fantasy Mystic Quest
- Reuben, a Minecraft pig from Minecraft: Story Mode
- Reuben Kincaid, the Partridge Family's manager
- Ruben Lozano, a crime lord antagonist in Red vs. Blue Season 14
- Ruben "Ruvik" Victoriano, main antagonist (The Evil Within)
- Reuben Price, "Captain Price", a bounty hunter antagonist in Just Roll With It
- Reuben Tishkoff, bank rolls con in “Ocean’s 11”
- Ruben (Georgie & Mandy's First Marriage), fictional character

== See also ==
- Rube
- Reubens (disambiguation)
- Reuven (name)
- Rubens (disambiguation)
- Rubin (disambiguation)
- Rupen (disambiguation)
- Roupen, a list of people with the given name
