= Rubin (surname) =

Rubin is a surname, Russian female form Rubina, and may refer to:

== A ==
- Aaron D. Rubin (born 1976), American linguistics researcher
- Adam Rubin, American writer
- Ahtyba Rubin (born 1986), American football player
- Alan Rubin (1943–2011), American musician
- Albert Rubin (1887–1956), Israeli artist
- Alissa J. Rubin, American journalist
- Alvin Benjamin Rubin (1920–1991), American judge
- Amalia Rubin, American singer known for Tibetan language songs
- Amy York Rubin, American writer and director
- Anatoly Rubin (1927–2017), Israeli holocaust survivor from Belarus
- Anna Rubin (born 1946), American composer
- Andy Rubin (born 1963), American businessman
- Andrew Rubin (1946–2015), American actor
- Arieh Rubin (born 1952), Israeli Paralympic swimmer
- Arthur Rubin (born 1956), American mathematician, son of Herman Rubin and Jean E. Rubin
- Arthur Rubin (theater producer) (1926–2023), American actor, theater manager and producer
- Avi Rubin (born 1967), American computer scientist

== B ==
- Barbara Rubin (1945–1980), American filmmaker
- Barbara Jo Rubin (born 1949), American jockey
- Barnett Rubin (born 1950), American political scientist
- Barry Rubin (1950–2014), Israeli academic
- Barry Rubin (American football) (born 1957), American football player and coach
- Ben Rubin (artist) (born 1964), American media artist
- Ben Rubin (legislator) (1886–1942), American politician from Wisconsin
- Ben Rubin (Magic: The Gathering player), American collectible card game player
- Benjamin Rubin (1917–2010), American microbiologist
- Benny Rubin (1899–1986), American actor and comedian
- Ben-Zion Rubin (born 1939), Israeli politician
- Bernard Rubin (1896–1936), Australian racing driver
- Bernard D. Rubin (1893–1948), American businessman
- Bruce Joel Rubin (born 1943), American screenwriter

== C ==
- Carl Rubin (architect) (1899–1955), Israeli architect
- Carl Bernard Rubin (1920–1995), American judge
- Carol Rubin (1945–2001), American film producer
- Carter Rubin (born 2005), American musical artist
- Chanda Rubin (born 1976), American tennis player
- Charles T. Rubin, American political scientist and philosopher
- Charlie Rubin, American screenwriter
- Craig Rubin, American medical scientist
- Cyma Rubin (born 1926), American producer and director

== D ==
- Daniel Rubin (born 1985), Swiss ice hockey player
- Daniel Nathan Rubin (1892–1965), American dramatist
- Danny Rubin (born 1957), American screenwriter and playwright
- Danny Rubin (basketball) (born 1991), American basketball player
- Daphne Rubin-Vega (born 1969), Panamanian actress
- Dave Rubin (born 1976), American political commentator
- David Rubin (academic administrator), American academic and administrator
- David Rubin (casting director) (born 1956/7), American casting director
- David Rubin (psychologist), American psychologist and academic
- David Rubin (writer) (1924–2008), American novelist
- David Rubin (activist) (born 1957), Israeli-American activist
- David S. Rubin (born 1949), American curator
- David T. Rubin (born 1968), American gastroenterologist and academic
- DeAndrew Rubin (born 1978), American football player
- Deborah Rubin (born 1948), American painter
- Dina Rubina (b. 1953), Russian-Israeli writer
- Donald Rubin (born 1943), American statistician
- Donna Rubin (born 1959), American tennis player}
- Doron Rubin (1944–2018), Israeli general

== E ==
- Eddie Rubin (1935–2014), American drummer
- Edgar Rubin (1886–1951), Danish psychologist
- Eduard Rubin (1846–1920), Swiss army officer and inventor
- Edward Rubin, American geneticist
- Edward Rubin (attorney) (1912–1999), American lawyer
- Elizabeth Rubin, American journalist
- Ella Rubin (born 2001), American actress
- Ellen G. K. Rubin, American book collector
- Ellis Rubin (1925–2006), American lawyer
- Emanuel Rubin (1928–2021), American pathologist
- Eric Rubin (born 1958), American microbiologist
- Eric S. Rubin (born 1961), American diplomat

== G ==
- Gail Rubin (1938–1978), American photographer
- Gareth Rubin (born 1976), British novelist and journalist
- Gayle Rubin (born 1949), American cultural anthropologist and activist
- Gerald M. Rubin (born 1950), American biotechnologist
- Gideon Rubin (born 1973), Israeli-British artist
- Gloria Rubin (born 1943), Paraguayuan broadcasting executive and politician
- Gretchen Rubin (born 1965), American author, blogger and speaker

== H ==
- Hanan Rubin (1908–1962), Israeli politician
- Hanna Rubina, birth name of Hanna Rovina (1888–1980), Russian-Israeli actress
- Harold Rubin (1932–2020), Israeli artist and free jazz musician
- Harry Rubin (virologist) (1926–2020), American virologist
- Harry M. Rubin (born 1952), American businessman
- Henry Rubin (born 1966), American sociologist
- Henry-Alex Rubin (born 1973), American film director
- Herman Rubin (1926–2018), American statistician and mathematician
- Howard Rubin (born 1955), American investment banker

== I ==
- Ian Rubin (born 1973), Russian rugby league footballer
- Ilan Rubin (born 1988), American musician
- Ira Rubin (1930–2013), American bridge player
- Irene S. Rubin (born 1945), American political scientist
- Irv Rubin (1945–2002), American Jewish activist
- Isaak Rubin (1886–1937), Russian Marxist economist
- Isidor Clinton Rubin (1883–1958), American gynecologist
- Irwin Rubin (1930–2006), American artist and academic

== J ==
- Jakob Rubin (born 1986), Danish cricketer
- James Rubin (born 1960), American diplomat and journalist
- James H. Rubin, American art historian and academic
- Jason Rubin (born 1970), American video game director
- Jay Rubin (born 1941), American translator and Japanologist
- Jean E. Rubin (1926–2002), American mathematician
- Jeff Rubin (born August 24, 1954), Canadian economist and author
- Jennifer Rubin (actress) (born 1962), American actress
- Jennifer Rubin (columnist) (born 1962), American political commentator
- Jennifer Rubin (policy analyst), British social scientist and academic
- Jerry Rubin (1938–1994), American social activist and counterculture icon
- Joel Rubin (born 1955), American musician
- Joel Martin Rubin (born 1971), American politician and commentator
- John Rubin (born 1948), American politician from Kansas
- Jon Rubin, American artist and academic
- Jordan Rubin (born 1972), American film director
- Judith Rubin, married name Judith Young (astronomer) (1952–2014), American physicist
- Judith A. Rubin (born 1936), American art therapist
- Julie Rubin (born 1972), American judge

== K ==
- Karen Rubin, American serial entrepreneur
- Karl Rubin (born 1956), American mathematician
- Kasper Rubin (born 1986), Danish cricketer, twin brother of Jakob Rubin
- Kathy Kleiner Rubin (born 1957), American author
- Kevin Rubin (born 1993), Israeli YouTuber

== L ==
- Larry Rubin (born 1974), American-Mexican businessman and political activist
- Laurie Rubin (born 1979), American mezzo-soprano
- Leigh Rubin, American cartoonist
- Lenny Rubin (born 1996), Swiss handball player
- Leon Rubin, British theatre director
- Leslie Rubin (1909–2002), South African politician
- Lillian B. Rubin (1924–2014), American sociologist and writer
- Lisa Rubin (born 1977), Canadian theatre director
- Ligaya Tiamson-Rubin, Filipino writer
- Louis D. Rubin Jr. (1923–2013), American literary critic and academic
- Lyndsey Monckton Rubin known professionally as Lynsey de Paul (1948–2014), English singer-songwriter and record producer

== M ==
- Mallory Rubin (born 1986), American editor and podcaster
- Mann Rubin (1927–2013), American novelist and screenwriter
- Marc Rubin (1932–2007), American author and gay rights activist
- Marcel Rubin (1905–1995), Austrian composer
- Mark Rubin (American football) (born 1985), American football player
- Mark Rubin (musician), American country musician
- Marla Rubin, Canadian theatre producer
- Martin Rubin (born 1964), Swiss handball player
- Matteo Rubin (born 1987), Italian footballer
- Max Rubin, American writer on gambling
- Melvin L. Rubin (born 1932), American ophthalmologist, academic and author
- Meyer Rubin (1924–2020), American geologist
- Michael Rubin (author) (born 1963), American author, educator and photographer
- Michael Rubin (businessman) (born 1972), American businessman
- Michael Rubin (composer), American musician
- Michael Rubin (historian) (born 1971), American historian and defense expert
- Mitchell Rubin, American businessman and politician from Pennsylvania
- Milton Rubin (1914–1996), American systems engineer
- Miri Rubin (born 1956), British historian
- Monika Rubin (born 1987), Danish politician
- Moses Josef Rubin (1892–1980), Romanian-American rabbi

== N ==
- Nancy Rubin, American diplomat
- Nancy Rubin, former name of Nancy Rubin Stuart (born 1944), American author and journalist
- Neal Rubin (born 1955), American cartoonist and writer
- Niklas Rubin (born 1995), Swedish ice hockey player
- Noah Rubin (music executive), American music executive
- Noah Rubin (tennis) (born 1996), American tennis player

== O ==
- Olga Rubin (born 1989), Israeli mixed martial arts fighter

== P ==
- Patricia Rubin, American art historian
- Paul Rubin (1942–2024), American economist
- Pauline Rubin (footballer) (born 1994), Swedish footballer
- Pauline Rubin, name after marriage Paula Eliasoph (1895–1983), American painter and poet
- Peter Rubin (born 1948), British physician
- Phil Rubin (born 1983), American attorney and politician from North Carolina House of Representatives
- Philip Rubin (born 1949), American cognitive scientist and science administrator
- Pinhas Rubin (born 1949), Israeli lawyer

== R ==
- Reuven Rubin (1893–1974), Israeli painter
- Reva Rubin (1919–1995), American nurse
- Richard Rubin (writer) (born 1967), American writer
- Richard Rubin (TV personality) (born 1983), American television personality and entertainer
- Rick Rubin (born 1963), American record producer
- Riduan Rubin, Malaysian politician
- Robert Rubin (born 1938), American banking executive, lawyer and government official
- Robert Joshua Rubin (1926–2008), American mathematician and physicist
- Ron Rubin (bridge) (born 1948), American bridge player
- Ron Rubin (voice actor) (born 1959), Canadian actor
- Roy Rubin (basketball) (1925–2013), American basketball coach
- Roy Rubin (rower) (born 1941), American rower
- Rubio Rubin (born 1996), Guatemalan footballer
- Ruth Rubin (1906–2000), Canadian-American folklorist and Yiddish scholar

== S ==
- Sabine Rubin (born 1960), French politician
- Sally Rubin, American documentary filmmaker
- Sam Rubin (1960–2024), American journalist
- Samuel Rubin (philanthropist) (1901–1978), Polish and American philanthropist
- Samuel M. Rubin (1918–2004), American businessman
- Schulem Rubin (1926–2001), American Orthodox rabbi
- Scot Rubin (born 1969), American talk show host
- Sean Rubin, American illustrator and author of children's books
- Selma Rubin (1915–2012), American environmentalist and activist
- Sergio Rubin, Argentine journalist and writer
- Shelley Rubin, American Jewish activist, wife of Irv Rubin
- Sherry Rubin, born Sherry Arnstein (1930–1997), American osteopathic physician and political theorist
- Solomon Rubin (1823–1910), Galician Hebrew author
- Stanley Rubin (1917–2014), American film producer
- Stephen Rubin (born 1937), British businessman
- Stephen Rubin (publisher) (1941–2023), American publisher and music critic

== T ==
- Tamara Rubin, American filmmaker and activist
- Theodore Isaac Rubin (1923–2019), American psychiatrist and author
- Tibor Rubin (1929–2015), US Army soldier, Medal of Honor recipient

== U ==
- Uri Rubin (1944–2021), Israeli academic
- Uzi Rubin (born 1937), Israeli defense engineer

== V ==
- Vanessa Rubin (born 1957), American jazz vocalist
- Vera Rubin (1928–2016), American astronomer
- Vera D. Rubin (1911–1985), American anthropologist
- Vladimir Rubin (1924–2019), Russian composer
- Vyacheslav Rubin (born 1968), Russian weightlifter

== W ==
- William Rubin (1927–2006), American art curator
- Władysław Rubin (1917–1990), Polish Cardinal

== Y ==
- Yadid Rubin (1938–2012), Israeli painter

== Z ==
- Zahara Rubin (born 1932), Israeli artist
- Zick Rubin (born 1944), American social psychologist, lawyer and author
- Zipora Rubin-Rosenbaum (born 1946), Israeli Paralympic athlete

== See also ==
- Felix Bernstein & Gabe Rubin, artist duo
- Rubín
- Rubins (surname)
- Ruben (surname)
