= David Rubin =

David Rubin may refer to:

- David Rubin (academic administrator), former dean and professor of communications of S. I. Newhouse School of Public Communications
- David Rubin (psychologist), professor of psychology at Duke University
- David Rubin (casting director), American casting director, president of AMPAS
- Dave Rubin (born 1976), American conservative political commentator, comedian, and host of The Rubin Report
- David Rubin (writer) (1924–2008), American novelist and translator
- David Rubin (activist), American-Israeli activist
- David S. Rubin (born 1949), American curator, art critic, and artist
- David T. Rubin (born 1968), American gastroenterologist

== See also ==
- David Reuben (disambiguation)
