= Reuben Davis =

Reuben Davis may refer to:

- Reuben Davis (American football) (born 1965), American football player
- Reuben Davis (politician) (1813–1890), United States representative

== See also ==
- Reuben Davis House, Aberdeen, Mississippi
- Reuben Davies or Reuben Brydydd y Coed (1808–1833), Welsh poet
- Reuben David (1912–1989), founder of the Ahmedabad Zoo
- David Reuben (disambiguation)
