= Robert Thompson (media scholar) =

American educator and media scholar (born 1959)

- Born: August 3, 1959 (age 66); Westmont, Illinois, US
- Occupation: Professor
- Years active: 1990–present
- Employer: Syracuse University

Robert James Thompson (born 1959) is an American educator and media scholar. He is the Trustee Professor of Television and Popular Culture at the S. I. Newhouse School of Public Communications at Syracuse University and founding director of the Bleier Center for Television and Popular Culture. He is widely quoted in media.

His areas of research are television history, Popular Culture, media criticism, and TV programming. Thompson's various soundbites have been dubbed by the Associated Press as "Thompson-isms". On February 4, 2009 Jon Hein of the Howard Stern Show announced that Thompson is his "arch nemesis," referring to popular culture trivia.

== Biography ==
Thompson was born in Westmont, Illinois, a suburb of Chicago to LeRoy Edward and Joan Alice Thompson. He holds a B.A. in political science from the University of Chicago (1981) and an M.A. (1982) and Ph.D. (1987) in radio, television and film from Northwestern University.

Thompson began his academic career at SUNY Cortland in 1987 and was hired by David Rubin at Syracuse University in 1990. In 1997, he started the Center for the Study of Popular Television with a gift from former network executive and producer, Fred Silverman. The center was renamed the Bleier Center for Television and Popular Culture in 2006 for Edward Bleier, former Warner Bros. president.

== Publications ==
Thompson has authored, co-authored, or edited six books and textbooks: Television Studies: Textual Analysis with Gary Burns (1989), Making Television: Authorship and the Production Process with Gary Burns (1990), Adventures on Prime Time: The Television Programs of Stephen J. Cannell (1990), Prime Time, Prime Movers (1992), Television's Second Golden Age (1997), and Television in the Antenna Age: A Concise History (2004).

In 2018, Thompson launched his first podcast with Newhouse colleague Charisse L’Pree entitled, Critical and Curious, which explores pop “trash” through the lens of media history and theory as well as representations of race, class, and gender. The first season closely analyzed the Fast and Furious franchise. The second season features a star study of Keanu Reeves.
