= Hear No Evil (1993 film) =

- Theatrical release poster
- Directed by: Robert Greenwald
- Written by: R.M. Badat; Danny Rubin; Kathleen Rowell
- Produced by: Robert Greenwald; David Matalon
- Starring: Marlee Matlin; D. B. Sweeney; Martin Sheen; John C. McGinley
- Cinematography: Steven Shaw
- Edited by: Éva Gárdos
- Music by: Graeme Revell
- Distributed by: 20th Century Fox (United States); Summit Entertainment (Overseas)
- Release date: March 26, 1993
- Running time: 97 minutes
- Country: United States
- Language: English
- Budget: $10 million
- Box office: $5,679,569

Hear No Evil is a 1993 American thriller film directed by Robert Greenwald, starring Marlee Matlin, D. B. Sweeney and Martin Sheen. It was released by 20th Century Fox on March 26, 1993. Matlin and Sheen would later co-star on the television series The West Wing.

== Plot ==
Jillian Shanahan, a deaf woman, and an athletic trainer, is unaware that her client, Mickey O'Malley, has hidden a stolen rare coin in her pager. After Mickey gets arrested at Jillian's apartment by Lt. Brock, a corrupt police officer, he gets interrogated by him in the back of a police car under the bridge. After that, he returns to Jillian's apartment, only to find Jillian is not there. He later goes to a diner owned by his friend Ben Kendall and tries to call Jillian, but does not get a response. Soon after, he leaves the diner in Ben's car. He is killed when the car gets blown up on the bridge, and the car lands in the river below. Ben begins to suspect that Lt. Brock is behind Mickey's death as well as series of terrifying threats that Jillian begins to receive. After the arrest of Lt. Brock, Jillian and Ben, now in a vacation abroad, are being stalked by a killer who also wants the coin, and is revealed to be Mickey. After a fatal cat-and-mouse game, Mickey will be killed by Jillian as an act of self-defense and the coin returns to the museum.

== Cast ==
- Marlee Matlin as Jillian Shanahan
- D. B. Sweeney as Ben Kendall
- Martin Sheen as Lt. Brock
- John C. McGinley as Mickey O'Malley
- Christine Carllisi as Grace
- Greg Wayne Elam as Cooper
- Charley Lang as Wiley

== Production ==
Principal photography began on May 4, 1992. Filming took place in and around Portland, Oregon where the film is set. Other locations in Portland included the Hawthorne Bridge, Mount Tabor Park, the Union Station, the Willamette River and at the Timberline Lodge at Mount Hood, Oregon where the final climax of the film was shot. Production officially wrapped on June 26, 1992.

== Release ==
Hear No Evil was released on March 26, 1993, in 1,430 theaters. It ranked at #6 at the box-office, making $2.6 million in its opening weekend. It went on to gross $5.6 million in its theatrical run.

=== Reception ===
The film received negative reviews from film critics and has a 20% rating on Rotten Tomatoes based on 10 reviews.

=== Home video ===
Hear No Evil was released on VHS on August 11, 1993, and on DVD on September 7, 2004.

== See also ==
- List of films featuring the deaf and hard of hearing
