= Margaret McFarland =

American psychologist

- McFarland in 1978
- Born: July 3, 1905; Oakdale, Pennsylvania
- Died: September 12, 1988 (aged 83); South Fayette Twp, Pennsylvania
- Education: Goucher College (BA); Columbia University (MA, PhD)
- Scientific career
- Fields: Developmental psychology
- Institutions: University of Pittsburgh

Margaret Beall McFarland (July 3, 1905 – September 12, 1988) was an American child psychologist and a consultant to the television show Mister Rogers' Neighborhood. She was the co-founder and director of the Arsenal Family and Children's Center in Pittsburgh, and much of her work focused on the meaning of the interactions between mothers and children. Fred Rogers referred to McFarland as his major professional influence.

A graduate of Goucher College and Columbia University, McFarland taught and conducted research with children in the United States and Australia. After earning a doctorate in childhood development, she taught at Mount Holyoke College in Massachusetts before returning to Pittsburgh. In 1953, with pediatrician Benjamin Spock and psychologist Erik Erikson, she co-founded the Arsenal Center as a nursery school and counseling center for children and their families. Professionals from various fields came to the center to learn about child development. McFarland remained the center's director until 1971. McFarland and Spock also established a child development department at the University of Pittsburgh School of Medicine.

McFarland met Fred Rogers in the 1950s when she agreed to supervise his work with a child for a seminary counseling course, and she became a child development consultant to Mister Rogers' Neighborhood in 1965. She met with Rogers on a nearly weekly basis and reviewed the content and wording of his scripts. She often influenced the presentation of material on the show, and McFarland and Rogers continued to meet until her death from myelofibrosis at the age of 83.

== Early life ==
McFarland, the youngest of three daughters, was born to Robert and Gertrude (Messer) McFarland on July 3, 1905, in Oakdale, Pennsylvania, a suburb of Pittsburgh. She was of Scottish and French-German ancestry. McFarland said she adored her father, but she knew that her sister, the middle child named Mary, was his favorite daughter. Her father died when she was five years old. McFarland remained unmarried and childless throughout her life, and she attributed that to her father's death. "And all of the subsequent phases of what it means to be loved by a male and loving to a male were lost to me. I wanted a kind of fathering," she said.

While her relationship with her father left her unfulfilled, McFarland described her mother as "natively invested in motherhood ... She gave me the sense the baby or the young child has great worth." Although she became interested in child development through babysitting jobs, she said that her mother's loving example significantly shaped her path to working with children as a career. "In the end I really wanted to be like my mother," she said. McFarland attended Goucher College, completing an undergraduate degree in 1927.

== Career ==
=== Academia and the Arsenal Center ===
After McFarland earned a master's degree at Columbia University in 1928, she spent a few years teaching and conducting personality research at the Winchester Thurston School in Pittsburgh and the Hubbard Woods Nursery School in Winnetka, Illinois. When McFarland taught at Hubbard Woods, she worked with the children enrolled in a study by Rose Haas Alschuler and La Berta Weiss Hattwick that resulted in their publication known as Painting and personality: A study of young children.

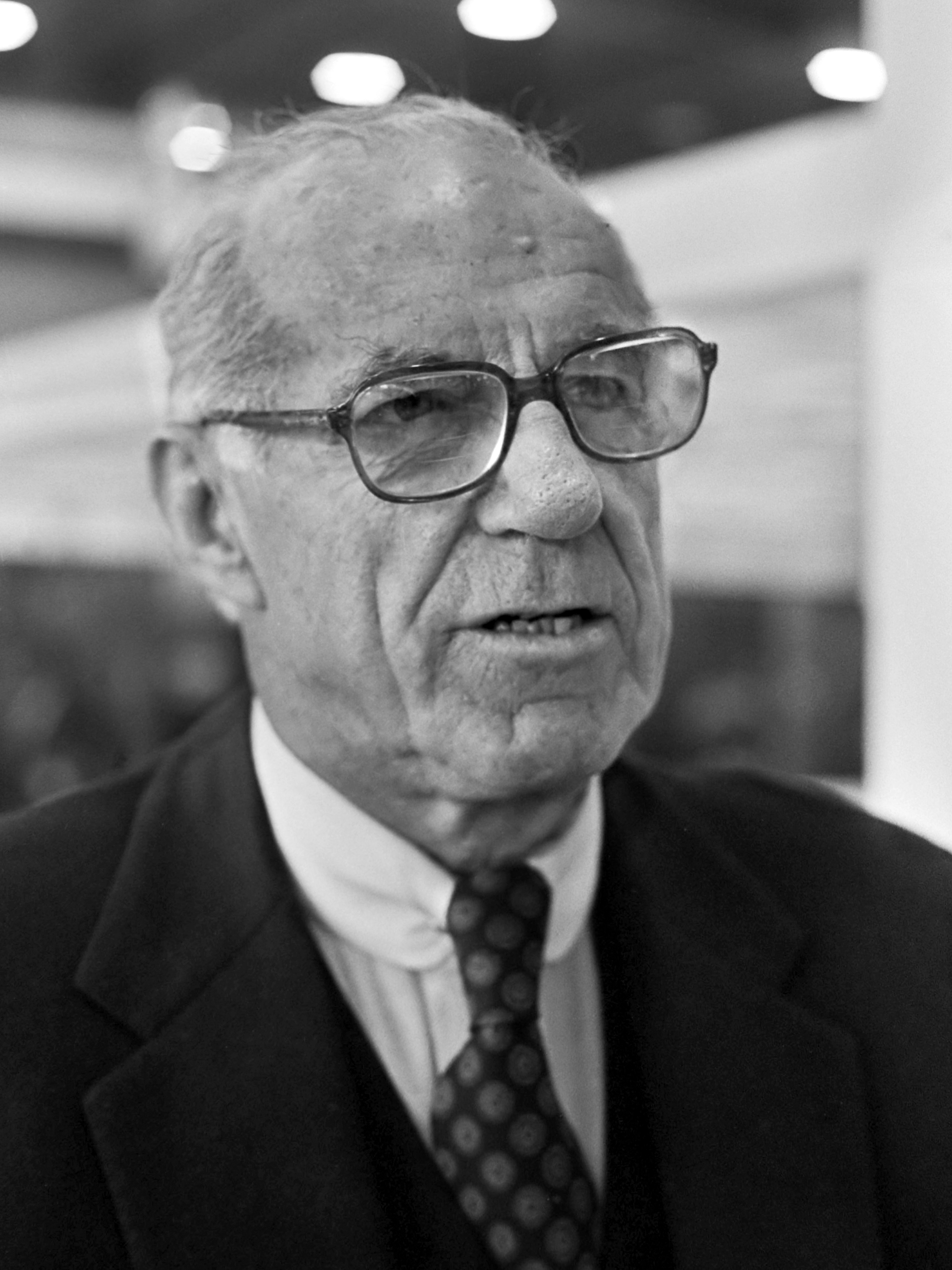
Pediatrician Benjamin Spock (pictured, 1976) was one of the co-founders of the Arsenal Family and Children's Center.

McFarland returned to Columbia to complete a Ph.D. in childhood development in 1938. She then went to Melbourne, where she was principal at the Kindergarten Training College. Returning to the United States in 1941, she taught at Mount Holyoke College as associate professor of Psychology and ran its children's school. During this time McFarland realized the importance of two concepts that defined much of her later work – the role of the woman in child development and the utility of creative play in childhood.

In 1951, McFarland returned to Pittsburgh and became an associate professor at the University of Pittsburgh. She co-founded the Arsenal Family and Children's Center with Benjamin Spock and Erik Erikson two years later. The center's goal was to teach physicians and other professionals about childhood development. Erikson spent one day a week at the center. "He spoke to me in a different way than any of the psychoanalytic literature," McFarland said of Erikson. Erikson was similarly complimentary of McFarland, saying that she "knew more than anyone in this world about families with young children." McFarland was the director of the Arsenal Center through 1971.

With Spock, McFarland co-founded the Department of Child Development and Child Care at the University of Pittsburgh School of Medicine. That department later moved to the university's School of Social Work. McFarland was also a member of the Pittsburgh Psychoanalytic Center. John Hitchcock, former director of the center, said that though McFarland was not a psychoanalyst, she was invited to teach there because she could impart a deep understanding of the nuances of parent-child interactions. She did not publish much academic literature; her primary impacts came from her direct work with families at the Arsenal Center and from her mentoring of students.

Through her work in psychology and education, McFarland developed specific ideas about the best ways to teach children. She believed that a teacher did not so much teach a specific attitude to a student, but that the child "caught" a certain attitude toward a subject based on the teacher's enthusiasm and commitment to the material. Once, when a sculptor came to visit young children at the Arsenal Center, she instructed him not to teach the children how to sculpt, but instead to just "love clay in front of the children". Douglas Robert Nowicki, a clinical child psychologist and a priest in the Roman Catholic Diocese of Pittsburgh, said that McFarland considered love to be the essential characteristic of a successful teacher.

=== Mister Rogers' Neighborhood ===
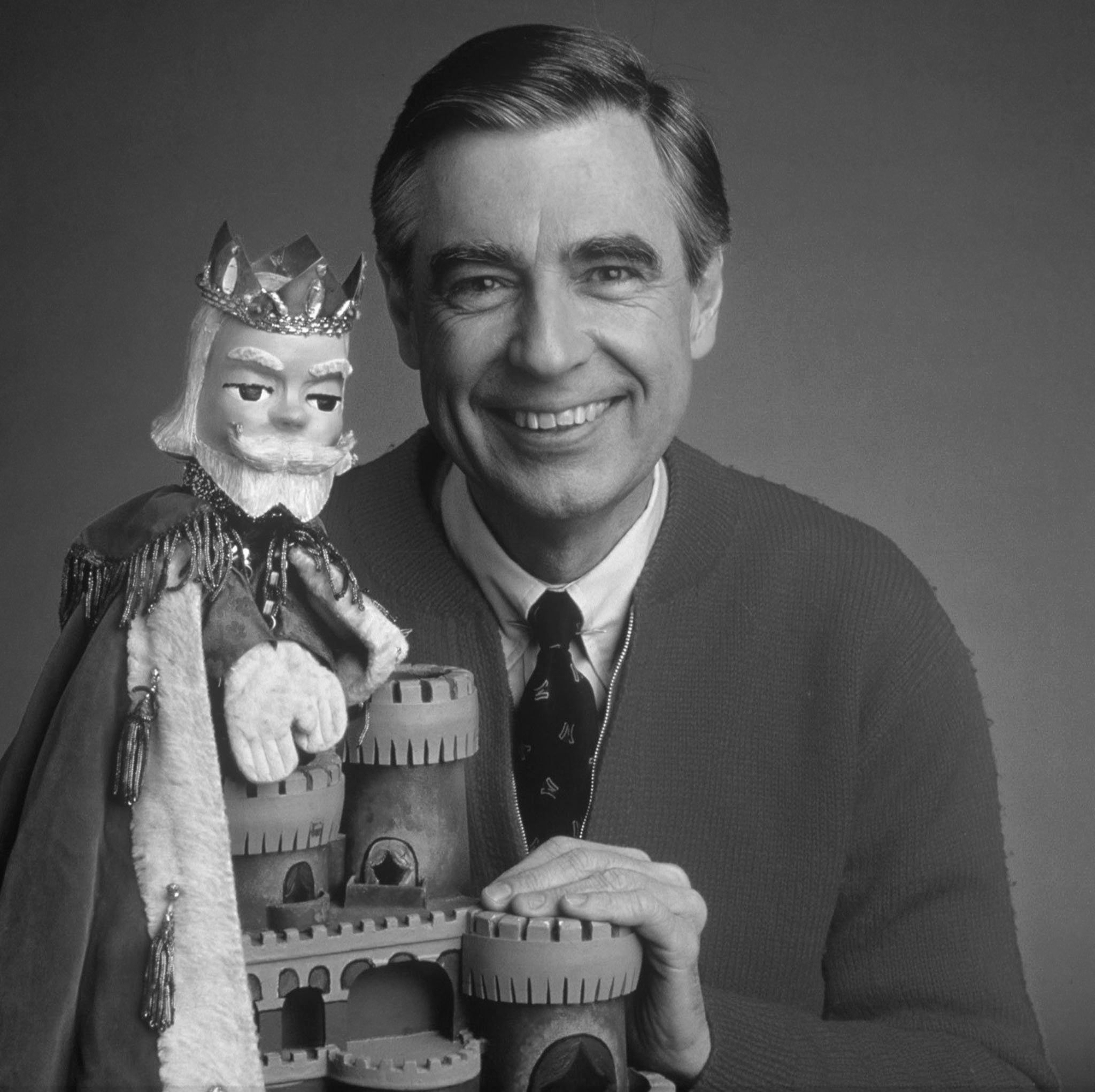
Fred Rogers in 1986

In the 1950s, Rogers began co-hosting and producing The Children's Corner, a television show filmed in Pittsburgh, with Josie Carey. On that show, Rogers was a puppeteer, so he did not appear on camera himself. During this time, he enrolled at the Pittsburgh Theological Seminary with the intent of utilizing religious training to further his television outreach to children. He was taking a seminary course in counseling, and McFarland supervised his counseling of a child as part of that class. After Rogers's course ended, McFarland continued to meet with him each week. She told him that he would be more effective on a show in which he appeared on camera himself. This way, McFarland said, Rogers would be able to help children to draw distinctions between reality and fantasy.

In 1966, Rogers began working on Mister Rogers' Neighborhood, and McFarland became the primary consultant to the show. She reviewed the show's scripts until her death, often suggesting improvements on what Rogers had created. She also consulted on Rogers's First Experience book series and his video series on parenting. Rogers recalled McFarland saying that "the basis of creativity was the desire to bridge the gap between what is and what might be."

McFarland used her background in child psychology to influence the presentation of the material on Mister Rogers' Neighborhood. For example, Rogers made his entrance at the beginning of each episode from screen left to screen right because McFarland said that mirrored the way a child's eyes moved when reading. Once, Rogers was preparing for an episode that would teach children about fire, and McFarland told him that children's fire-related dreams were closely related to their thoughts about controlling their body fluids. The episode started with a segment on common types of water flow, such as water filling a bathtub, and then there was a small, brief make-believe fire. When a few parents called the show and said that their children were experiencing some urinary difficulties, Rogers felt that McFarland had given him insight into the nature of the issue.

Rogers said that McFarland was "so other-directed that when you were in her presence, you felt you were important." He referred to McFarland as "the most major influence in my professional life." Rogers's book "Mister Rogers Talks to Parents" is dedicated to McFarland. The spin-off series, Daniel Tiger's Neighborhood, includes a character named for her.

== Later life and legacy ==
McFarland was diagnosed with a bone marrow disorder called myelofibrosis in the 1970s, and by 1987 she was receiving blood transfusions. Despite having difficulties with her mobility by that time, she was still meeting with Rogers weekly and holding discussions in her home with other former students and mental health professionals. With two colleagues, she was also analyzing videos for a research study on ego development in infancy and early childhood.

During a 1987 interview, McFarland was asked about the biggest issue for child development at that time, and she said it was the trend toward children being raised largely in group settings such as daycare centers. McFarland believed that there was no comparable replacement for a mother in the child-rearing process, and she was curious to learn more about the negative and positive results of such an upbringing. Despite her strong feelings about the contributions of women to the family unit, she said she was not a feminist. She felt that women were more introspective than men, leading to opportunities for them to be more creative, and she said that groups like the National Organization for Women did not recognize the uniqueness of women in this regard.

On September 12, 1988, McFarland died at County Meadows Nursing Home in South Fayette Township. After her death, a number of people, including early art therapist Judith A. Rubin and language specialist Ethel Tittnich, described her influence on them. Rubin characterized McFarland as a "creative catalyst" and "my professional mother". She contributed to a Festschrift in recognition of McFarland's work. In the epigraph of a book on children's language, Tittnich compared McFarland to a teacher described in Kahlil Gibran's The Prophet, saying that McFarland led students "to the threshold of [their] own minds".

In 2015, the Fred Rogers Center for Early Learning and Children's Media at Saint Vincent College established a project to analyze recorded conversations between McFarland and Rogers. The project's goal is to characterize the impact of these discussions on the development of Mister Rogers' Neighborhood.

== See also ==
- Won't You Be My Neighbor?, 2018 documentary on Rogers which mentions McFarland's influence
