= Danny Rubin =

American screenwriter and playwright (born 1957)

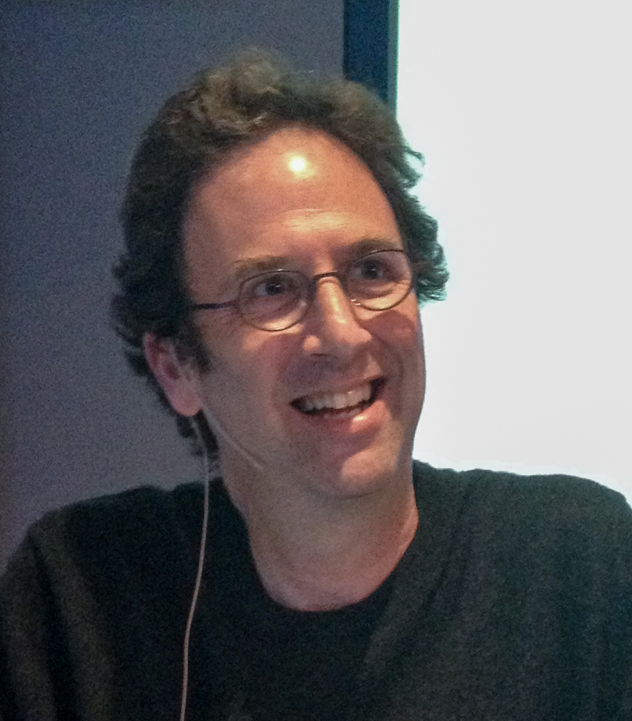
- Rubin in 2013
- Born: Daniel Rubin; 1957 (age 68–69); San Francisco, California, US
- Education: Brown University; Northwestern University (M.A.)
- Occupations: Screenwriter; playwright
- Relatives: Albert Isen (grandfather); Melvin L. Rubin (father); Michael Rubin (brother)
- Writing career
- Notable awards: BAFTA Award for Best Screenplay (1994); ALFS Award (1994); Laurence Olivier Award for Best New Musical (2017)
- Website: dannyrubin.com

Daniel Rubin (born 1957) is an American screenwriter and playwright. He wrote the original story, and then co-wrote with Harold Ramis the screenplay for the 1993 comedy film Groundhog Day, for which the two received a BAFTA Award for Best Screenplay.

The stage musical Groundhog Day based on the film premiered in 2016, which won the Laurence Olivier Award for Best New Musical in 2017.

== Early life and education ==
Rubin was born in San Francisco, the son of Melvin Rubin, an ophthalmologist, and Lorna (née' Isen), owner of a publishing business, and grew up in Gainesville, Florida. His grandfather was Albert Isen, former mayor of Torrance, California. His brother, Michael, is an author, and sister, Gabrielle, a visual artist.

Rubin received a B.A. in biology from Brown University and a M.A. in radio, television, and film from Northwestern University.

== Career ==
Rubin wrote the original story, and then co-wrote with Harold Ramis the screenplay for the 1993 comedy film Groundhog Day, for which the two received a BAFTA Award for Best Screenplay. The film is considered one of the greatest films ever made and one of the best screenplays of all time. He co-wrote Hear No Evil, released the same year. With Jefery Levy, he co-wrote the 1994 film S.F.W.

In 2016 the stage musical Groundhog Day, which is based on the film, premiered at The Old Vic in London. It was nominated for eight Laurence Olivier Awards in 2017, winning for Best New Musical; it later opened on Broadway in 2017, and was nominated for seven Tony Awards, including Best Musical. The musical has a book by Rubin, based on his original story.

Rubin has taught screenwriting at numerous universities and lectured on the topic at academic conferences since 1995. He was a Briggs-Copeland Lecturer on English at Harvard University.

== Filmography ==
=== Writer ===
- Groundhog Day (with Harold Ramis) (1993)
- Hear No Evil (with Randall M. Badat and Kathleen Rowell) (1993)
- S.F.W. (with Jefery Levy) (1994)
- È già ieri (Italian remake of Groundhog Day) (2004)

=== Stage ===
- Groundhog Day (2016 musical)

== Awards ==
=== Nominated ===
- Saturn Award for Best writing 1994: Groundhog Day
- Tony Award for Best musical 2017: Groundhog Day The Musical

=== Won ===
- BAFTA Film Award for Best Screenplay 1994: Groundhog Day
- ALFS Award for screenwriter of the year 1994: Groundhog Day
- Laurence Olivier Award for Best New Musical 2017: Groundhog Day The Musical

== Books ==
- Rubin, Danny (2012). How To Write "Groundhog Day" (eBook). Boston: Triad Publishing.
