= Lorraine Branham =

Journalist and Dean of the Newhouse Communications School at Syracuse University

- Born: Lorraine Elizabeth Green; December 7, 1952; Philadelphia, Pennsylvania, U.S.
- Died: April 2, 2019 (aged 66); Fayetteville, New York, U.S.
- Occupation: Dean of the S. I. Newhouse School of Public Communications at Syracuse University
- Spouse: Mel Williams

Academic background
- Education: Temple University; Stanford University
- Influences: Ed Bradley

Lorraine Elizabeth Branham (December 7, 1952 – April 2, 2019) was an American newspaper editor and the Dean of the S. I. Newhouse School of Public Communications at Syracuse University. She was considered one of the most important African American academics in journalism and was well known for her mentoring of young journalists.

== Early life and education ==
Branham was born on December 7, 1952, in Philadelphia to Jesse Williams and Leona Green. After her parents split up early, she was raised by her mother and her stepfather, Henry Walls. She was the oldest of her 13 siblings. She graduated from Overbrook High School in Philadelphia and majored in radio, television and film at the Klein College of Media and Communication of Temple University, graduating in 1976.

Branham was married to Norris Branham, with whom she had a son before divorcing. During her college years, she was a single mother. She married Melvin Williams in 1997. She kept her surname when she married Williams.

Branham was a John S. Knight Fellow at Stanford University in 1986.

== Print journalism career ==
Branham began her professional career in 1976 as a reporter with The Philadelphia Tribune. She held reporting and editing jobs at Camden Courier-Post in New Jersey, The Philadelphia Bulletin, and The Baltimore Sun.

From 1987 to 1996, Branham worked for The Philadelphia Inquirer. She rose through the newspaper's management ranks, including stints as New Jersey editor and city desk in Philadelphia, before being named associate managing editor for features.

In February 1996 Branham was hired as the executive editor of The Tallahassee Democrat in Tallahassee, Florida, where she was the first woman and first African-American in that position. She was forced out for editorship at Democrat in October 1999 over declining readership. She took a position as assistant to the publisher at The Pittsburgh Post-Gazette, where she worked until 2002.

== Academic career ==
During her newspaper days, Branham taught reporting and writing at Temple University. She also taught in the summer program for minority journalists at the University of California, Berkeley. She was a Hearst Visiting Professional-in-Residence at the University of Missouri, the University of Florida, and the California Polytechnic State University in San Luis Obispo, California.

After spending 25 years in professional ranks, Branham became the director of School of Journalism and the G.B. Dealey Regents Professor at the University of Texas at Austin from 2002 to 2008.

=== Newhouse School ===
Branham was chosen from a field of 300 applicants to be dean of the Newhouse School effective July 2008. She replaced David Rubin, who had served in the same post for previous 18 years.

During Branham's tenure, the school established the Center for Digital Media Entrepreneurship the Diane and Bob Miron Digital News Center, the Peter A. Horvitz Endowed Chair in Journalism Innovation, and the W2O Group Center for Social Commerce. Branham championed the development of the student-produced news website The NewsHouse. Under her leadership, the Newhouse School created its sports communications emphasis and the Newhouse Sports Media Center. She also helped establish satellite campus programs, Newhouse in New York and Syracuse University Los Angeles Semester.

Branham oversaw an $18 million fundraising campaign for the renovation of Newhouse 2 and creation of multiple new facilities. In September 2014, Oprah Winfrey was the guest of honor during dedication of the new Newhouse Studio and Innovation Center, featuring Dick Clark Studios and the Alan Gerry Center for Media Innovation.

She was also determined to make the school more diverse. Amy Falkner, who succeeded Branham as the acting dean, said that during Branham's tenure the percentage of faculty members of color increased to 25 percent from 17 percent, and the percentage of women on the faculty increased to 45 percent from 35 percent. A quarter of the student body is now people of color, and two-thirds of the students are women.

After her death, Amy Falkner served in the interim capacity until Mark J. Lodato was appointed to the position in March 2020. Donald Newhouse, whose father founded the Newhouse school, was grateful for her service to the school and profession, and said that Branham had taken "a great school and with a monumental effort remolded it to keep it relevant to a world that is constantly in flux".

== Awards ==
- 2011 Philadelphia Association of Black Journalists Trailblazer Award
- 2011 Temple University School of Communications and Theater Gallery of Success Award
- 2017 Alumni Hall of Fame Honoree at Klein School of Temple University

She served as a juror for the Pulitzer Prize journalism awards, the Selden Ring Award for Investigative Journalism, the Scripps National Journalism Awards, and many other journalism award committees.

== Death and legacy ==
Branham, who lived outside Syracuse, died of uterine cancer on April 2, 2019.

Syracuse University and the Newhouse School established two scholarship programs in her memory to recruit and support Newhouse students from socioeconomically disadvantaged populations and other underrepresented groups.
