= Rubín =

Rubín is a surname, and may refer to:

- Amparo Rubín (1955–2024), Mexican singer and composer
- Antero Rubín (1851–1935), Spanish general
- Enriqueta González Rubín (1832–1877), Spanish writer
- Erik Rubín (born 1971), Mexican singer and actor

== See also ==
- Rubin (surname)
