= Michael Rubin (author) =

American author, educator and photographer (born 1963)

- Born: September 24, 1963 (age 62)
- Education: Brown University
- Occupations: Author; educator; photographer
- Children: 2
- Relatives: Albert Isen (grandfather); Melvin L. Rubin (father); Danny Rubin (brother)
- Writing career
- Years active: 1982–present
- Genre: Non-fiction
- Notable works: Computer Gardening Made Simple; Nonlinear: a guide to digital film and video editing; Droidmaker: George Lucas and the Digital Revolution
- Website: neomodern.com

Michael Rubin (born September 24, 1963) is an American author, educator and photographer. Author of the 2005 book Droidmaker: George Lucas and the Digital Revolution which chronicles the early days of Lucasfilm and Pixar, Rubin began writing books in college. His first book was published in 1982 about video gaming followed by his 1984 book Computer Gardening Made Simple.

Growing up in Gainesville, Florida, Rubin graduated from Brown University in 1985. After college, Rubin worked for Lucasfilm which introduced him to film editing and related emerging technologies, specifically nonlinear editing. In 1991 he wrote Nonlinear: A Guide to Digital Film and Video Editing followed later by several editing textbooks.

In 1993, Rubin co-founded a do-it-yourself ceramics chain then later held senior product positions at Netflix and Adobe. In 2016, Rubin left Adobe to pursue photographic interest and is a fine art photographer who teaches photography workshops in Santa Fe, New Mexico.

== Early life and education ==
Rubin grew up in Gainesville, Florida, the son of Melvin Rubin, an ophthalmologist, and Lorna (née' Isen), owner of a small publishing business. His grandfather was Albert Isen, former mayor of Torrance, California. His brother, Danny Rubin, is a screenwriter and sister Gabrielle, a visual artist. Rubin was taught darkroom and photographic effects by family friend Jerry N. Uelsmann, whom Rubin credits for introducing his family to fine art photography.

Rubin was featured in a 1984 United Press International article for submitting a nude photo of himself with a carefully placed fig leaf in response to Brown University's college application request to "use this space to give us as complete a picture of yourself as possible". He was subsequently featured on December 20, 1984's cover of USA Today for the article "Brown may be 'Hottest' Campus".

Rubin graduated from Brown University with a degree in neuroscience in 1985.

=== Early publications ===
While a freshman, Rubin wrote Defending the Galaxy: The Complete Handbook of Video Gaming in 1982, one of the first comprehensive books about coin-operated arcade video games. A satire, the book covers various genres and game play and also the social and cultural aspects of gaming. In the 2014 book Game After: A Cultural Study of Video Game Afterlife, Raford Guins noted "Rubin's book also addresses (often in a colorful manner) the experience of these games within their varied public environments". Video game columnist Rawson Stovall described the book as "unique". The book and author were each featured in Twin Galaxies trading cards.

In 1984, as a junior, he produced the humorous Computer Gardening Made Simple under the pen name Chip DeJardin, a how-to guide coming complete with two "seeds" (computer chips). The 31-page book received national attention, being reviewed by Playboy and The Los Angeles Times among others, after Rubin targeted several reviewers sending them a copy in handwritten envelopes with personalized notes. Describing the book, Art Seidenbaum of the Los Angeles Times stated "Admirers of the British Broadcasting Co. may be reminded of the brilliant BBC documentary showing agricultural Italians in colorful dress cutting strips of spaghetti from glorious pasta trees".

== Career ==
=== Nonlinear editing and publications ===
After college Rubin joined Lucasfilm's Droid Works as a marketing specialist on the SoundDroid (an early digital audio workstation) and EditDroid, an analog nonlinear editing (NLE) system. When Lucasafilm closed The Droid Works in 1987, he joined his former-bosses at The Droid Works in their digital audio start-up Sonic Solutions. Shortly after he joined CMX Systems as the product manager of the CMX 6000, another LaserDisc-based nonlinear editing system. While at CMX, Rubin assisted on projects using the technology, including the CBS miniseries Lonesome Dove and Bernardo Bertolucci's The Sheltering Sky. A member of the Motion Pictures Editor's Guild (IATSE), Rubin trained Guild members nonlinear editing. Later, he is credited with cutting the first TV show using the Avid, She-Wolf of London before working with Apple's Final Cut Pro.

An ardent nonlinear editing proponent, Rubin wrote the first edition of Nonlinear: a guide to digital film and video editing in 1991, which popularized the term "nonlinear editing" and was used in film schools and in Hollywood as the industry transitioned from celluloid to digital. There were four editions between 1991 and 2001.

He created AFI's first academic online course for Fathom, a joint venture including Columbia University and the AFI, "Introduction to Digital Video" in 2001. After The Little Digital Video Book (2001) he wrote a series of books with Peachpit Press: Beginner's Final Cut Pro (2002), Making Movies with Final Cut Express (2003), a series with Apple on iLife ('04, '05, '06), and a second edition of The Little Digital Video Book (2008).

In 2005, he authored Droidmaker: George Lucas and the Digital Revolution which chronicles the early days of Lucasfilm with a focus on the company's computer division. Writing for the Library Journal, Rosalind Dayen called the book "fascinating", claiming "There are many books on Lucas, but none quite like this one: the combination of Rubin's insider information and research gives readers a view of how movies came to incorporate digital advances".

=== Later career and business ventures ===
In 1993, Rubin co-founded Petroglyph Ceramic Lounge, a do-it-yourself ceramics studio, with his then-girlfriend, Jennifer Kurtz, whom he later married. Santa Cruz based, Petroglyph pioneered the contemporary ceramic studio industry. By 1998 Petroglyph had expanded into a chain of stores in Northern California.

From 2006 to 2016, Rubin held senior product positions at tech companies and founded other startups. During that time, Rubin was director of product at Netflix, and senior innovator at Adobe.

=== Photography ===
In 2016, Rubin left Adobe to pursue photographic interests, founding Neomodern in 2017, a bricks-and-mortar photographic printing and framing business in San Francisco targeting smartphone photographers which closed in 2020.

Rubin is the director of The Rubin Collection, a family collection of 20th-century photography which includes works by artists such as Ansel Adams and Henri-Cartier Bresson among others and teaches photography at Santa Fe Workshops in Santa Fe, New Mexico.

Rubin published The Photograph as Haiku in 2023, outlining his curriculum and philosophy of photography. In his review, Nicholas Klacsanzky of the Haiku Society of America stated, "This is a pivotal book in the realm of photography and haiku as an intersection. It's both a page-turner and a space to contemplate".

== Selected publications ==
- Rubin, Michael (1982). Defending the Galaxy: The Complete Handbook of Video Gaming. Triad Publishing. ISBN 0937404179.
- DeJardin, Chip (1984). Computer Gardening Made Simple.
- Rubin, Michael (1991). Nonlinear: A Guide to Digital Film and Video Editing. Gainesville, Fla.: Triad Pub. Co. ISBN 0937404853.
- Rubin, Michael (2001). Little Digital Video Book, The. Peachpit Press. ISBN 9780201758481. OCLC 938910520.
- Rubin, Michael (2006). Droidmaker : George Lucas and the digital revolution. Gainesville, Fla.: Triad Pub. Co. ISBN 0-937404-67-5. OCLC 60856108.
- Rubin, M.H. (2023). The Photograph as Haiku. Santa Fe, NM: Lulu. ISBN 978-1-387-39582-8.

== Personal life ==
Rubin married Jennifer (Kurtz) Rubin in 1994 (divorced in 2013) with whom he shares two children.
