= Peter Fisher (activist) =

American writer and activist

- Born: Peter Randolph Fisher; May 19, 1944; Richmond, Virginia, U.S.
- Died: July 10, 2012 (aged 68)
- Education: Columbia University
- Occupations: Author, gay activist
- Notable work: The Gay Mystique (1972)
- Partner: Marc Rubin (37 years)

Peter Fisher (May 19, 1944 – July 10, 2012) was an American author and gay rights activist. An alumnus of Amherst College and Columbia University, he served in the US Air Force prior to becoming an early member of the Gay Activists Alliance, a protest group that split off from the Gay Liberation Front after the Stonewall riots with the goal of "writing the revolution into law." Fisher led a number of the "zaps", protests targeted at public figures, organized by the Gay Activists Alliance, as well as serving as an unofficial historian for the group.

Describing Fisher, activist Bill Bahlman said: “Whenever he spoke at a GAA meeting, everybody listened. He could turn the debate on an issue around. And at demonstrations, he was larger than life.”

== Biography ==
Fisher graduated from Eastchester High School. He also graduated from Columbia University in 1969. He was pursuing a graduate degree “but resigned to become a full-time homosexual."

Fisher received the Stonewall Book Award in 1972 for The Gay Mystique: The Myth and Reality of Male Homosexuality, later described as "one of the first books to look at the subject from the inside rather than from a heterosexual’s viewpoint." His manuscripts and papers are archived at the Lesbian, Gay, Bisexual & Transgender Community Center in New York, together with those of his partner and fellow activist Marc Rubin. Fisher and Rubin met through the Gay Activists Alliance and were together for 37 years, until Rubin's death from cancer in 2007. Never recovering from Rubin's death, Fischer died by suicide in 2012. The two's ashes were scattered together in Fisher's sister's backyard in Springfield, Massachusetts.

== Bibliography ==
- The Gay Mystique: The Myth and Reality of Male Homosexuality (1972)
- Special Teachers/Special Boys (1979) (with Marc Rubin)
- Dreamlovers (1980)
- Black Star (1983)

== See also ==
- Sylvia Rivera
- Vito Russo
- Marc Rubin
