= Craig Rubin =

American medical scientist

Craig Rubin is an American medical scientist in internal medicine.

He is currently the Katy Sinor and Kay Pritchard Professor in Medical Education, the Margaret and Trammell Crow Distinguished Chair in Alzhemier's and Geriatric Research, the Walsdorf Professor in Geriatrics Research and the Seymour Eisenberg Distinguished Professor in Geriatric Medicine at University of Texas Southwestern Medical Center.
