= Melvin L. Rubin =

American ophthalmologist, academic and author (born 1932)

- Born: 1932; San Francisco, CA, U.S.
- Died: 2014 (aged 81–82)
- Education: UCSF
- Known for: President of the American Academy of Ophthalmology
- Children: Gabrielle; Danny; Michael
- Scientific career
- Fields: Ophthalmology
- Workplaces: University of Florida

Melvin L. Rubin, M.D. (born 1932) was an American ophthalmologist who specialized in retinal diseases, optics and refraction. A professor emeritus at University of Florida Health, he is known for his contributions to ophthalmic education and research. Rubin was president and board member of the American Academy of Ophthalmology and chairman of the American Boards of Ophthalmology. According to JAMA Ophthalmology, Rubin was "one of the foremost scholars and teachers of his generation."

== Early career ==
Trained initially as an optometrist, Rubin later studied medicine at the University of California, San Francisco. After completing his internship he earned a masters degree and completed his residency at the University of Iowa in Iowa City. He worked with the US Public Health Service as executive secretary of the NIH Research Training Committee in Bethesda, Maryland, before moving to Gainesville, Florida.

== Career ==
A professor of ophthalmology at University of Florida Shands Health Center from 1963, he was Chair of the Department of Ophthalmology from 1977-1995. After stepping down, he remained at Shands as the Richardson Eminent Scholar Chair. He became professor emeritus in 1997.

Well-known as a retinal surgeon, Rubin also held a number of distinguished positions in ophthalmic organizations. He was president and late on the board directors of the American Academy of Ophthalmology (1988); president of the Foundation of the AAO; and chairman of the American Boards of Ophthalmology (ABO). He was instrumental within the American Ophthalmological Society Council, modernizing the organization’s educational programs at annual meetings; and trustee as well as president (1979) of the Association for Research in Vision and Ophthalmology (ARVO). Additionally, he was as an editor for industry journals including "Survey of Ophthalmology" and the "Archives of Ophthalmology," and served on advisory boards of nonprofits dedicated to the prevention of blindness.

Rubin was a prolific writer and author of several textbooks central to ophthalmic education. While secretary for instruction for the Academy of Ophthalmology, he created the Ophthalmic Knowledge Assessment Program (OKAP) which remains an annual part of residency training programs. During his career, Rubin traveled widely teaching optics and refraction, presented dozens of named lectures, and wrote more than 100 scientific papers. Two of his books, Optics for Clinicians and The Fine Art of Prescribing Glasses, according to JAMA Ophthalmology, were "the cornerstone of education in these fields for a generation of ophthalmologists." In 1979 The Fine Art of Prescribing Glasses won an "AMMY" from the American Medical Writers Association as the best medical book of the year. He also received a Special Recognition Award from The American Academy of Ophthalmology for accomplishments in eye science and education. Rubin was reportedly most proud of having been named 2012 Alumnus of the Year, by his UCSF Medical School class.

== Personal life ==
Rubin was married to Lorna (née' Isen), an independent publisher and had three children, Gabrielle, Daniel, and Michael. He was also interested in photography—he built a large and significant collection of 20th century photographs.

== Legacy ==
According to JAMA Ophthalmology, Rubin was "one of the foremost scholars and teachers of his generation."

The copyrights for The Dictionary of Eye Terminology were gifted to the American Academy of Ophthalmology in 2015, which has produced new editions of the work. The dictionary is currently in its 8th edition.

The Florida Society of Ophthalmology named their only named lectureship for Rubin.

The Melvin and Lorna Rubin endowment was established in 1997 to support the acquisition of photography for the Samuel P. Harn Museum of Art’s collections. In recognition for this and other contributions, there is a "Melvin and Lorna Rubin" gallery in the Harn, dedicated to showing photographic works.

== Selected publications ==
- Rubin, Melvin; Walls, Gordon (1965). Studies in Physiological Optics. Charles C. Thomas Publisher.
- Rubin, Melvin; Walls, Gordon (1972). Fundamentals of Visual Science. Charles C. Thomas. ISBN 0398016259.
- Rubin, Melvin (1974). Optics for Clinicians. Gainesville, FL: Triad Publishing Co. ISBN 0937404349.
- Rubin, Melvin; Milder, Benjamin (1978). The Fine Art of Prescribing Glasses (Without Making a Spectacle of Yourself) (2nd ed.). Gainesville, FL: Triad Publishing Co. ISBN 0960047220.
- Rubin, Melvin; Cassin, Barbara (1980). The Dictionary of Eye Terminology (6th ed.). Gainesville, FL: Triad Publishing Co. ISBN 093740473X.
- Rubin, Melvin; Winograd, Lawrence (2002). Taking Care of Your Eyes. Gainesville, FL: Triad Publishing Co. ISBN 0937404616.
