= Judith A. Rubin =

American art therapist (born 1936)

Judith A. Rubin (born 1936) is an American art therapist with 50 years of experience. She is best known for her writing and her films on art therapy for disabled children, as well for her role as the "Art Lady" on the popular television show, Mister Rogers' Neighborhood.

== Life and work ==
Judith A. Rubin was born in New York City in 1936. At age 17, Rubin first experienced art as a way to cope with trauma after the death of her friend. Rubin completed her bachelor's in art from Wellesley College in 1957 and pursued a Master's degree in education from Harvard University. While attending graduate school, Rubin recalled a seminar in Human Development where she presented on "The Psychology of Children's Art." During her graduate studies, Rubin came across the work of Margaret Naumburg and became interested in art therapy. In 1959, Rubin graduated from the Harvard Graduate School of Education with her master's in art education; she later earned a PhD at the University of Pittsburgh.

In 1958, Rubin began working as a teacher in Cambridge, MA. Rubin reportedly enjoyed working with the children, but was criticized for her unconventional teaching methods. Rubin's teaching methods included singing in the classroom, re-arranging furniture, declining to use paddles for discipline, failing to write detailed lesson plans, and showing slides of artwork that were not in the curriculum. Rubin believed the children benefited from making art, but found teaching to be less satisfying than she had hoped.

In 1963, Rubin learned about a study of children's art at a local child study center nursery and contacted the director, Dr. Margaret McFarland, to volunteer her services. Although Rubin had no clinical background, McFarland invited her to facilitate art therapy with children diagnosed with schizophrenia. Rubin found art therapy to be immensely gratifying and sought the guidance of art therapists Margaret Naumburg and Edith Kramer to further her career as a trained art therapist.

Rubin recalled that both contributed greatly to her professional development. Naumburg and Kramer held different views about art therapy but both advised Rubin to undergo personal therapy and seek supervision under an experienced clinician. In 1964, Rubin presented a case to Professor Erik Erikson of Harvard University. Much to her surprise, Erikson opposed any further clinical training in psychology and suggested it might ruin her intuitive approach. With that advice, she postponed further clinical study for almost ten years.

In 1964, Rubin met Fred Rogers through Dr. McFarland. Rogers invited Rubin to be on his new public television program, Mister Rogers' Neighborhood. Rubin appeared as the "art lady" for three years (1966-1969) and used her segments to communicate the therapeutic value of art to viewers. Rubin also gained exposure to filmmaking during this time, which influenced her later work.

Rubin established an art program for physically-disabled children in 1967 and met with child psychiatrist, Dr. Marvin Shapiro, in 1968 to join an Expressive Arts Study Group at the Pittsburgh Child Guidance Center. Rubin enrolled in the Pittsburgh Psychoanalytic Institute, training first in adult and then in child psychoanalysis and met the dissertation requirement by writing her book Child Art Therapy. She completed her Ph.D. in Counseling Psychology from the University of Pittsburgh in 1976 and earned her licensure as a psychologist in 1979. She completed post-doctoral work at the Pittsburgh Psychoanalytic Institute in 1983.

Rubin has contributed to the field of art therapy by serving in a number of professional positions as well as writing numerous articles, books, lectures and films. Rubin became a Registered Art Therapist (ATR) in 1970 and a Board Certified Art Therapist (ATR-BC) in 1994. She served on the American Art Therapy Association (AATA) board from 1973 to 1979, including as president from 1977 to 1979. In 1981, she received the award for Honorary Life Member.

In addition to her writing, Rubin has worked in private practice and has taught at many universities in the U.S. and abroad. She is currently an assistant professor in the Department of Psychiatry at the University of Pittsburgh, where she has been on the faculty since 1974 and also has served as faculty-by-invitation at the Pittsburgh Psychoanalytic Institute since 1983. She is also a co-founder and president of a nonprofit educational organization called Expressive Media Inc, which helps produce and disseminate films and media on the use of arts in therapy.

== Reception and legacy ==
Rubin’s approach to art therapy particularly her emphasis on art-making as a symbolic language has been cited in art therapy education and training programs. In her survey of the field, Maxine Junge highlighted Rubin’s role in expanding the use of expressive media in therapy and described her as a key figure in the development of art therapy as a profession in the United States. Critics have noted that while her emphasis on phenomenological and intuitive interpretation has been influential, it can present challenges for empirical validation in clinical research. Despite this, Rubin’s books continue to be assigned in graduate art therapy programs, and her films are used internationally as visual teaching tools.

== Published works ==
Rubin's books include;

- The Art of Art Therapy,
- Approaches to Art Therapy,
- Artful Therapy,
- My Mom and Dad Don't Live Together Anymore: A Drawing Book for Children of Separated or Divorced Parents,
- Introduction to Art Therapy: Sources and Resources,
- What Do You See?: Phenomenology of Therapeutic Art Expression (with Mala Gitlin Betensky),
- Drafting and Design for Architecture Workbook,
- I Saw Something Bad: A Drawing Book About Accidents, Disasters, Violence and War,
- Breakthrough (with Dan Aron).

== Films ==
Having started in television in the late 1960s with Mr. Rogers' Neighborhood, Rubin has been making films since the early 1970s. She stated that film aided in teaching about art therapy when words were not completely adequate. Her first film in 1972, We'll Show You What We're Gonna Do, documented a therapeutic art program with blind children. Shortly after, she created Children and the Arts which highlighted the therapeutic value of the arts when working with children who were at-risk for problem behavior. Since then, she has created six other films: Beyond Words (art therapy with older adults), Breakthrough (artists in analytic therapy), Art Therapy: A Universal Language for Healing (art therapy around the world), Yes You Can! (art therapy for people with disabilities), and Art Therapy Has Many Faces (now subtitled in 14 languages). With her drama therapy colleague, Dr. Eleanor Irwin, she has produced The Green Creature Within (multimodal therapy with adolescents), and Creative Healing in Mental Health (art and drama in assessment and therapy).

In 2016 she appeared in Art Therapy: The Movie.
