= Marc Rubin =

American author and gay rights activist (1932–2007)

- Born: Morris M. Rubin; April 2, 1932
- Died: February 28, 2007 (aged 74)
- Education: Brooklyn College; Queens College, City University of New York
- Occupations: Author, gay activist
- Notable work: Special Teachers/Special Boys (1979)
- Partner: Peter Fisher (activist)

Marc Rubin (April 2, 1932 – February 28, 2007) was an American author and activist involved in the gay liberation movement.

== Career ==
Rubin received a Bachelor of Arts from Queens College, City University of New York, in 1954 and a master's degree from Brooklyn College in 1957. In 1964, he was involved in the Freedom Summer, a volunteer campaign launched to register as many African-American voters as possible in Mississippi. He also taught at the Freedom School in Shaw.

Rubin was a founding member of the Gay Teachers Association and the Institute for the Protection of Lesbian and Gay Youth, later known as the Hetrick-Martin Institute. He was also active in the Lavender Hill Mob and ACT UP.

After the Stonewall uprising, he joined the newly formed Gay Activists Alliance (GAA). While chair of the GAA's Municipal Government Committee, Rubin conceived of and planned of one of the group's most famous zaps, which took place at the New York City Marriage Bureau. When New York's city clerk Herman Katz threatened legal action against the Church of the Beloved Disciple for performing same-sex “holy union” ceremonies, about 35 GAA members showed up at Katz's office with donuts, coffee, and a wedding cake that was adorned with a gold lambda, same-sex couples, and the inscription “GAY POWER TO GAY LOVERS.” GAA members distributed leaflets throughout the building inviting city employees to the party that said, “The Honorable Herman Katz, City Clerk, invites you to an engagement reception for Messrs. John Basso and John G. Bond, Messrs. Steve Krotz and Vito Russo, at his office, Room 265, Municipal Building, Friday, June 4, 1971, at 10:00 a.m. All welcome. Dress optional. Sponsored by Gay Activists Alliance.” Rubin was quoted as saying the zap demonstrated “that everybody in New York had better know that they can’t push gay people around, because the community’s there and will stand up for its own.” GAA later showed videotapes of the zap at their dances to help demonstrate to people the concept and power of zaps.

Rubin met his longtime partner, Peter Fisher, through the Gay Activist Alliance. Rubin and Fischer authored the book Special Teachers/Special Boys, published in 1979 by St. Martin's Press. It was based on Rubin's experience teaching troubled youth. The two were together for 37 years until Rubin's death. Rubin's manuscripts and papers are archived at the Lesbian, Gay, Bisexual, & Transgender Community Center in New York. They were donated by Peter Fisher before Fischer's death in 2012. Rubin was diagnosed with brain and prostate cancer toward the end of his life. Never recovering from Rubin's death, Fischer died by suicide in 2012. The two's ashes were scattered together in Fisher's sister's backyard in Springfield, Massachusetts.
