= Stephen Rubin (publisher) =

American publisher and music critic (1941–2023)

Stephen Edward Rubin (10 November 1941 – 13 October 2023) was an American publisher and music critic.

== Early life and education ==
Born in the Bronx, New York to parents of Eastern European Jewish descent, Rubin received a bachelor's degree from New York University and a master's degree in journalism from Boston University.

== Career ==
In the 1970s, Rubin began his career by writing about classical music for The Times and later founded Writers Bloc, a syndicate for freelance writers. He briefly worked as an editor at Vanity Fair in the early 1980s.

Rubin entered the publishing industry at Bantam Books at the age of 43. He quickly adapted to the industry, securing a significant advance for a debut novel that achieved bestseller status. He rose to the position of editor-in-chief at Bantam and later assumed leadership roles at Doubleday and Doubleday Broadway (part of Random House). His tenure at Doubleday was notable for the successful promotion of John Grisham's The Firm, and his time at Doubleday Broadway was marked by the publication of Dan Brown's The Da Vinci Code.

Rubin gained recognition in the publishing industry for his role in releasing titles such as Mark Haddon's The Curious Incident of the Dog in the Night-Time and Lauren Weisberger's The Devil Wears Prada, both published in 2003, with the latter adapted into a film in 2006.

The 2008 financial downturn impacted Doubleday, leading to layoffs and Rubin's reduced role following a merger with Knopf. At Henry Holt, Rubin was involved in high-value deals, including with Bill O'Reilly, which brought significant revenue but also controversies.

Rubin's tenure at Holt was marked by a challenging period in 2017 when allegations of sexual harassment against one of his authors surfaced, impacting the company's financial stability. He transitioned to a consulting role at Simon & Schuster in 2020.

Rubin also founded the Rubin Institute for Music Criticism, contributing to music journalism. His memoir provided insights into various aspects of his professional life, including his perspective on literary failures and corporate dynamics.

In 2018, Rubin oversaw the publication of Michael Wolff's Fire and Fury: Inside the Trump White House.

== Personal life ==
Rubin married Cynthia Robbins, an opera-focused manager and publicist, in 1966. They did not have children.
