= Reuben Davies =

Welsh poet

Reuben Davies (Reuben Brydydd y Coed) (1808-1833) was a Welsh poet. His family were from the Cribyn area of Ceredigion, where his father worked as a weaver. After completing his education in local schools, he planned to enter the Unitarian ministry. Shortly after entering Carmarthen College in 1825, he was taken ill and was unable to continue his studies. He became the schoolmaster at Cribyn (and later at Cilmaenllwyd, Carmarthenshire).

He was also a prolific poet and writer. His works include over fifty hymns, several englynion-style poems, and a memorial awdl to D. L. Jones, a Carmarthenshire tutor. He translated the works of many Greek and Latin authors (e.g. those of Ovid) into Welsh.

He died, aged 25, in January 1833, and is buried in Dihewyd churchyard.
