= Howard Rubin =

American investment banker (born 1955)

- Born: 1955 (age 70–71); Massachusetts, United States
- Education: Lafayette College (BS); Harvard University (MBA)
- Occupation: Investment banker
- Known for: Contributed to the development of the collateralized mortgage obligation
- Spouse: Mary Henry (m. 1985; div. 2021)
- Children: 3

Howard Rubin (born 1955) is an American retired investment banker. He gained prominence on Wall Street in the 1980s as a bond trader at Salomon Brothers, where he contributed to the development of the collateralized mortgage obligation (CMO) market and was profiled in Michael Lewis's 1989 book Liar's Poker. Rubin later held senior positions at Merrill Lynch, Bear Stearns, and Soros Fund Management.

In September 2025, a federal grand jury indicted Rubin on charges of sex trafficking, interstate transportation for prostitution, and bank fraud, stemming from allegations of coercing dozens of women into commercial sex acts over a decade.

== Early life and education ==
Rubin was born in 1955 to Leon Rubin and Laura Solomon Rubin. He grew up in Massachusetts as the son of a researcher for Polaroid in Cambridge. He earned a bachelor's degree in chemical engineering from Lafayette College and later obtained a Master of Business Administration degree (MBA) from Harvard Business School.

== Career ==
Rubin began his Wall Street career in the fall of 1982 as a bond trader at Salomon Brothers, where he helped pioneer the market for collateralized mortgage obligations (CMOs) by studying behavioral patterns in mortgage prepayments. He was featured in Michael Lewis's Liar's Poker as a young trader applying card-counting techniques from blackjack to trading strategies, reportedly earning $25 million in his first year.

In 1983, he was able to research when groups of homeowners were likely to prepay their mortgages, and used this information to make profitable trades for Salomon. His salary was set at $90,000 despite the fact that he earned $25 million for the firm; 1984 was similar, earning $30 million and being paid $175,000. Rubin believed that he was responsible for the multimillion-dollar revenues, while Salomon's management believed it was due to the firm with Rubin playing a part. So the firm felt the compensation paid to him was fair. In 1985, Rubin left Salomon Brothers for a 3-year, $1 million annual compensation package at Merrill Lynch, plus a percentage of his trading profits.

In 1987, Rubin made a series of transactions that led to a $250 million loss. Specifically, he traded $500 million in interest only securities, allegedly against his supervisor's instructions, leading to his dismissal from Merrill Lynch. He faced administrative proceedings from the Securities and Exchange Commission, and settled them without admitting or denying guilt. He subsequently joined Bear Stearns, where he worked from 1987 to 1999. Rubin was suspended as a broker by the Securities and Exchange Commission on April 2, 1990, for a period of 9 months. In 1999 he retired from financial management, and served on several boards for the next several years

From 2008 to 2015, Rubin was a portfolio manager at Soros Fund Management, focusing on mortgage-backed securities. He retired for the second time from finance thereafter and resided in Fairfield, Connecticut.

Rubin was also portrayed as a minor character in the 2015 film The Big Short, adapted from the book of the same name, which referenced his trading activities.

== Personal life and philanthropy ==
In 1985, Rubin married Mary Henry, a fellow Wall Street professional. The couple had three children and were active in New York City's philanthropy scene, donating hundreds of thousands of dollars to organizations such as the New York Junior League and Hope for a Cure in 2015 and 2016. They owned luxury properties, including a co-op on Manhattan's Upper East Side and a $9 million waterfront estate in the Hamptons. The couple divorced in July 2021 after 36 years of marriage, amid allegations of abuse.

== Legal issues ==
=== 2017 civil lawsuits ===
In 2017, six women, including former Playboy models, filed civil lawsuits against Rubin alleging that he had subjected them to beatings, rape, and non-consensual BDSM acts in exchange for payments. The suits claimed violations of the Trafficking Victims Protection Act. During a 2022 trial Rubin was found liable and ordered to pay $3.85 million to the plaintiffs.

=== 2025 federal indictment ===
On September 26, 2025, Rubin and his former personal assistant, Jennifer Powers, were indicted in the U.S. District Court for the Eastern District of New York on 10 counts, including sex trafficking by force, fraud, or coercion; transportation of individuals across state lines for prostitution; and bank fraud. The charges relate to an alleged scheme from 2009 to 2019 in which the pair recruited dozens of women—often through social media or modeling websites—to travel to New York City for commercial sex acts involving BDSM elements.

According to the indictment, encounters initially occurred in luxury Manhattan hotels before shifting to a soundproofed "dungeon" in Rubin's two-bedroom penthouse atop the Metropolitan Tower at 146 West 57th Street near Central Park, equipped with BDSM apparatus including electrocution devices. Prosecutors allege that Rubin exceeded the scope of consent, ignoring safe words and continuing violent acts even when women were unconscious or injured, causing lasting physical and psychological harm. Powers is accused of arranging travel, payments (typically $5,000 per session), and non-disclosure agreements to silence victims, while structuring transactions to evade bank reporting. The operation allegedly cost over $1 million.

A separate count accuses Rubin of bank fraud for misrepresentations used to secure financing for Power's mortgage in Texas. If convicted, Rubin faces a mandatory minimum of 15 years and up to life imprisonment on the sex trafficking charge, among other penalties.

Rubin was arrested at his Connecticut home and arraigned in Brooklyn federal court, where he pleaded not guilty; a magistrate ordered his detention pending trial, deeming him a flight risk and danger to the community. Powers was arrested in Texas. The Federal Bureau of Investigation has established a tip line for potential victims. Rubin's trial date was set for September 2027.
