= Henry Rubin =

American sociologist (born 1966)

Henry S. Rubin
- Born: 1966 (age 59–60)
- Occupation: Sociologist
- Employer: Quincy College
- Known for: Transsexual studies

Henry S. Rubin (born 1966) is an American sociologist known for work on transsexualism.

== Early life and education ==
Rubin earned a Bachelor of Arts degree in 1988 from University of California, Santa Cruz and a master's degree and Ph.D. in sociology from Brandeis University in 1996.

In 1994 he was interviewed by Sophie E. Constantinou for the short documentary Trans.

== Career ==
After lecturing at Harvard University from 1996 to 2000, Rubin held one-year assistant professorships at Clark University in Worcester, Massachusetts, in 2000 and Hamilton College in 2001. He was appointed at Tufts University in the Media & Communications department from 2002-2005, working as a research analyst at Harvard University during that time. Following a one-year position as programs coordinator at Colleges of the Fenway in 2005, Rubin took a position as an instructor at Quincy College in Quincy, Massachusetts, in 2007.

Rubin's work explores the political tensions that emerge from differing worldviews and identities within the LGBT community.

Rubin is known for arguing that the most meaningful division is not between the queer and transsexual communities, but between the transgender and transsexual communities.

He has also explored how the "logic of treatment" is different for trans men and trans women, outlining the now-outdated use of chemical castration on female-to-male people. Rubin is a thought leader in the movement to distance transsexual political interests from those of the transgender movement as that movement becomes more aligned with the queer movement.
