= David Reuben =

David Reuben may refer to:

- David and Simon Reuben, British businessmen and philanthropists
- David Reuben (author) (born 1933), California psychiatrist, sex expert and author
