= David T. Rubin =

American gastroenterologist and academic (born 1968)

- Occupations: Professor of Medicine, University of Chicago

Academic background
- Education: University of Illinois at Urbana Champaign

Academic work
- Discipline: Gastroenterology
- Institutions: University of Chicago

David T. Rubin (born 1968) is an American gastroenterologist and academic. He is the Joseph B. Kirsner Professor of Medicine and professor of pathology at the University of Chicago, where he is also the chief of the Section of Gastroenterology, Hepatology and Nutrition. He also serves as the director of the Inflammatory Bowel Disease Center at the University of Chicago. He is also an associate faculty member at the MacLean Center for Clinical Medical Ethics, associate investigator at the University of Chicago Comprehensive Cancer Center and a member of the University of Chicago Committee on Clinical Pharmacology and Pharmacogenomics.

== Education and training ==
Rubin obtained his Doctor of Medicine degree with honors at the University of Chicago Pritzker School of Medicine. He went on to complete his internship, residency, and fellowship at the University of Chicago where he served as Chief Resident and Chief Fellow. He also completed a fellowship in Clinical Medical Ethics at the MacLean Center for Clinical Medical Ethics and a leadership development course at the Harvard T.H. Chan School of Public Health.

== Career ==
Rubin specializes in the treatment and assessment of inflammatory bowel diseases (Crohn's disease and ulcerative colitis). He performs scientific research related to outcomes in inflammatory bowel diseases with particular interest in the prevention of cancer associated with these diseases and strategies to modify the disease course and control inflammation. He is involved in the design and execution of clinical trials for new therapies in inflammatory bowel diseases.

Rubin is a Fellow of the American Gastroenterological Association (AGAF), the American College of Gastroenterology (FACG), the American Society for Gastrointestinal Endoscopy (FASGE), the American College of Physicians (FACP), and the Royal College of Physicians in Edinburgh (FRCP (Edinburgh)). Dr. Rubin is a Co-Founder (with Dr. Marla Dubinsky) of Cornerstones Health, Inc, a non-profit medical education organization. He is the immediate past chair of the National Scientific Advisory Committee of Crohn's & Colitis Foundation and Chair of the International Organization for the Study of IBD.

Rubin's research is focused on disease modification in IBD including clinical trial designs, novel measures of inflammation and prevention of adverse outcomes, and quality of life in IBD. He has twice received the ACG’s Governor’s Award of Excellence in Clinical Research (2003 and 2013), and in 2020, Dr. Rubin received the Sherman Prize for Excellence in Crohn’s and Colitis. In 2023, he received both the UChicago Michael Reese Lectureship Award (for outstanding faculty who have developed novel teaching and clinical research that advances healthcare) and the distinguished UChicago Arthur H. Rubenstein Mentorship in Academic Medicine Award. Rubin is currently a senior editor of the 12th edition of Sleisenger and Fordtran’s Gastrointestinal and Liver Disease, and an author on >500 articles on management of IBD, including the 2025 ACG Guidelines for ulcerative colitis.

== Selected works and publications ==
Rubin is the editor of Curbside Consultation in IBD: 49 Clinical Questions, third edition and an editor of Sleisenger and Fordtran's Gastrointestinal and Liver Disease, twelfth edition. He is an associate editor of the journals of Intestinal Research, Inflammatory Bowel Diseases and Gastroenterology & Hepatology, and co-editor of the ACG Education Universe.

His latest publications can be found here.

1. ACG Clinical Guideline Update: Ulcerative Colitis in Adults. Rubin DT, Ananthakrishnan AN, Siegel CA, Barnes EL, Long MD. Am J Gastroenterol. 2025 Jun 3;120(6):1187-1224.
2. Safety and efficacy of combination treatment with calcineurin inhibitors and vedolizumab in patients with refractory inflammatory bowel disease. Christensen B, Gibson P, Micic D, Colman RJ, Goeppinger S, Kassim O, Yarur A, Weber C, Cohen RD, Rubin DT. Clin Gastroenterol Hepatol. 2019;17(3):486-493.
3. Histologic Normalization Occurs in Ulcerative Colitis and Is Associated With Improved Clinical Outcomes. Christensen B, Hanauer SB, Erlich J, Kassim O, Gibson PR, Turner JR, Hart J, Rubin DT. Clin Gastroenterol Hepatol. 2017;5:1557-64.
4. The Crohn's and Colitis Foundation of America Survey of Inflammatory Bowel Disease Patient Healthcare Access. Rubin DT, Feld LD, Goeppinger S, Kim S, Margolese JM, Rosh J, Rubin M, Rodriquez DM, Wingate L. Inflamm Bowel Dis. 2017;23:224-32.
5. Using a Treat-to-Target Management Strategy to Improve the Doctor-Patient Relationship in Inflammatory Bowel Disease. Rubin DT, Krugliak Cleveland N. Am J Gastroenterol. 2015;110:1252-6.
6. Ethical Consideration for Clinical Trials in Inflammatory Bowel Disease. Rubin DT, Becker S, Siegler M. Gastroenterol Hepatol. 2014;10:37-41.
7. Inflammation is an Independent Risk Factor for Colonic Neoplasia in Patients with Ulcerative Colitis: A Case-Control Study. Rubin DT, Huo D, Kinnucan JA, Sedrak MS, McCullom NE, Bunnag AP, Raun-Royer EP, Cohen RD, Hanauer SB, Hart J, Turner JR. Clin Gastroenterol Hepatol. 2013;11:1601-8.

== Honors and awards ==
Sir Stanley Davidson Named Lectureship	2024
8th Annual Mark W. Babyatsky, MD Memorial Lectureship	2024
Arthur H. Rubenstein Mentorship in Academic Medicine Award	2023
Michael Reese Lectureship Award	2022
Recipient of the Champion of Mission Advancement by the Crohn’s & Colitis Foundation - Illinois Carol Fisher Chapter	2022
Recipient of the GI Research Foundation’s Joseph B. Kirsner Award	2022
Nominee, the Women in Medicine Summit #HeforShe Award	2021
Sherman Prize Recipient	2020
Dr. Joseph B. Kirsner Mentorship Award (Given by the Senior Fellows)	2012, 2020
John D. Arnold, MD Mentor Award for sustained excellence in mentoring a Pritzker medical student, University of Chicago (mentorship of Laura Glick, class of 2019)	2018 – 2019
Fellow, University of Chicago Pritzker School of Medicine Academy of Distinguished Medical Educators	2009 – 2018
Inaugural Social Media Influencer Award, Healio Disruptive Innovators Awards	2018
Crohn's & Colitis Foundation Uniting to Care & Cure Award, Catalyst for Policy Change.	2018
Lifetime Achievement Award, Brazilian Association for Ulcerative Colitis and Crohn's disease	2017
Julius J. Deren Invited Lectureship Optimizing the Use of Therapies for IBD: Current Status and Vision for the Future. University of Pennsylvania Grand Rounds (CME), Philadelphia, PA	2015
Selected by Becker's ASC Review as one of the leading 191 Gastroenterologists in the United States	2015
Sir Francis Avery Jones Visiting Professor: New Goals for IBD Management – Do They Translate to Better Outcomes? Frontiers in Intestinal and Colorectal Disease, 13th Annual International Congress St. Mark's Hospital, Harrow UK	2015
Peer-elected, Castle Connolly Top Doctor in Gastroenterology	2013– 2014
American Journal of Gastroenterology lectureship: “The emerging role of the microbiome in the pathogenesis and management of inflammatory bowel disease”	2013
“Ginzburg-Oppenheimer Invited Lecturer”, Mt. Sinai Medical Center (NYC) (Ginzburg and Oppenheimer were the other authors on the Landmark original Crohn's disease paper.)	2013
American College of Gastroenterology Governor's Award of Excellence in Clinical Research	2003, 2013
Peer-elected Member of Best Doctors, recognition for superior clinical abilities	2001, 2007–2013
ACG Freshman Governors’ Award	2012
Recipient of Rosenthal Award, the Crohn's & Colitis Foundation's National Leadership Award for Patient Support and Care (presented to the volunteer who demonstrates uncommon leadership and has contributed in an indisputable way to the quality of life of patients and families through patient service, professional education and advocacy).	2012
Selected to be honored by the Crohn's & Colitis Foundation of America Illinois Chapter for contributions to the CCFA and patients with IBD at their annual benefit dinner	2012
Bucksbaum Institute Senior Faculty Scholar Award	2012
Voted by Top Tier MD as one of the top 3% of physicians in Chicago	2011
Selected by Becker's ASC Review as one of the leading 125 Gastroenterologists in the United States	2011
Selected by fellows to receive the 2010 Fellowship Teaching Award for being an outstanding teacher and role model	2010
Peer-elected Member of America's Top Physicians, Gastroenterology	2003, 2004, 2005, 2007 – 2008
University of Chicago Postgraduate Teaching Award: in recognition of Significant Contributions for Fellowship Education	2006
Cancer Research Foundation Young Investigator Award	2004
Richard W. Reilly Award for outstanding aptitude in the field of gastroenterology	1994
Upjohn Award in Medicine, for outstanding achievement during four years in the Pritzker School of Medicine	1994
Alpha Omega Alpha honor society	1993
