= David Rubin (activist) =

Israeli-American activist (born 1957)

- דייוויד רובין
- Born: 1957 (age 68–69)
- Occupations: Activist, philanthropist, author
- Known for: Founder of the Shiloh Israel Children's Fund, former mayor of Shiloh
- Awards: Yakir Binyamin Prize (2022)

David Rubin (Hebrew: דייוויד רובין; born 1957) is an American-Israeli activist, philanthropist, and author. He is a former mayor of the Israeli town of Shiloh and the founder of the Shiloh Israel Children's Fund, which works to heal the trauma of children who were victims of terrorist attacks.

== Early life and career ==
In the early 1980s, Rubin was a public school teacher in Brooklyn. From 1985 to 1987, Rubin attended Machon Meir yeshiva in Jerusalem.

In 1992, Rubin moved to Israel. While studying again at Machon Meir yeshiva, he saw a brochure about the Samarian town of Shiloh. After a visit to the community, he decided to move there and started working as an English teacher.

In 1999, Rubin became the mayor of Shiloh.

In 2001, Rubin and his three-year-old son were seriously wounded in a terrorist attack. While driving home from Jerusalem, Rubin’s car was ambushed by three Fatah terrorists and he was shot in the leg by a gunman with an AK-47 assault rifle. Rubin’s son was shot in the head, where the skull meets with the neck, causing a skull fracture and internal bleeding in the cerebellum; the bullet missed his brain stem by one millimeter and he survived.

Rubin said that he and his son were transformed by the experience and wanted to build something positive after the event. In 2004, Rubin established the Shiloh Israel Children’s Fund in order to help children recover from trauma. The organization supports therapeutic, educational, and recreational programs.

In 2022, Rubin received the Yakir Binyamin Prize for his contributions to the development of the Binyamin region.

== Political views ==
Rubin has appeared on many American television and radio shows. Rubin said that the United States and Israel can "further God’s purposes in the world” with the Bible as the blueprint.

Rubin has stated that he lives in Shiloh because he believes it is the front line in the struggle for the Land of Israel. Rubin said the entire West Bank region should be placed under permanent Israeli sovereignty.

Rubin said he supported Donald Trump during the 2016 campaign because he believed Trump would be the most pro-Israel American president and would support Israeli housing construction in Jerusalem.

In 2017, Rubin said he was frustrated by liberal American Jews who opposed President Trump's executive order limiting travel from seven Muslim-majority countries.

In 2018, Rubin said on Fox News Channel's Tucker Carlson Tonight that the Israeli government’s building of a border wall on the Israel-Egypt border solved Israel’s illegal immigration problem.

In 2019, Rubin said that Rep. Rashida Tlaib should be denied entry to Israel due to the congresswoman's support for boycotts against Israel.

In 2020, Rubin described the peace agreement between Israel and the United Arab Emirates as a "huge" accomplishment that was achieved because the two countries see Iran as a shared threat.

== Personal life ==
Rubin married in 1993. He and his wife have six children.

== Publications ==
Rubin has written seven books. His first book was called “God, Israel and Shiloh”.

In 2015, he published "Sparks from Zion”, a collection of his writings about the centrality of Israel in international politics and diplomacy.

In 2019, Rubin published "Trump and the Jews", which explores the relationship between Donald Trump and the Jewish people and Israel.

In 2021, Rubin published "Confronting Radicals: What America Can Learn from Israel".
