= Albert Isen =

Albert Isen was the first directly-elected mayor of Torrance, California.

== Early life and education ==
Isen moved to Torrance with his family in 1913, the eldest son of Jack Isen, a city founder. He went on to graduate from Torrance High School in 1924 and the University of Southern California Law School, being admitted to the State Bar of California in 1930.

== Career ==
In 1933, Isen opened his own law office in Torrance. Isen petitioned the city council to become the city police judge in 1934 instead of city attorney Charles T. Rippy; Isen had gathered 437 signatures and volunteered to till the position without pay. In 1935, Isen led a group who circulated petitions calling for the recall of Mayor Scott Ludlow and three city councilmen.

He was elected to the Torrance City Council in 1954. The Council appointed him mayor in 1955. A special election held prior to 1958 changed the structure of the government; the size of the Council was increased to seven members and the office of the mayor became directly elected. Isen announced his candidacy for the mayoral race in February 1958. He was subsequently re-elected in 1962 and 1966, but lost to Ken Miller in 1970, who had promised to restrict mayors to two terms. In 1963, developer Don Wilson, who was building the new Southwood Riviera Royale tract in Torrance, was sued by the California attorney general for violating the Unruh Civil Rights Act by refusing to sell homes to African-American families in Dominguez Hills; at the June 25, 1963 city council meeting, Isen was famously quoted as saying "if Torrance has any Negroes, it has so few that I don't know whom I could appoint [to an interracial committee]." From 1955 to 1970, the population of Torrance grew by 100,000 while Isen was mayor.

== Personal life ==
Isen was married and had one child, Lorna. He died from a brain tumor on August 17, 1987, aged 79.

== Legacy ==
Isen is credited with establishing the annual Armed Forces Day Parade, opening a branch of the Los Angeles County Superior Court, and attracting the Del Amo Fashion Center to Torrance. The city's transit center, built in 1986, is named for Isen.
