= David Rubin (academic administrator) =

American academic and administrator

Dean of S. I. Newhouse School of Public Communications
- In office 1990–2008
- Preceded by: Lawrence Myers Jr. (interim)
- Succeeded by: Lorraine Branham

Personal details
- Education: Columbia University (BA); Stanford University (PhD)
- Occupation: Scholar; Administrator

David M. Rubin is an American professor of communications and academic administrator who served as dean of the S. I. Newhouse School of Public Communications of Syracuse University from 1990 to 2008.

== Early life and education ==
Rubin grew up in the east side of Cleveland and graduated from Columbia College in 1970 with a B.A. in American history. After college, he accepted a fellowship to study communications and received a M.A. and Ph.D. in Communications from Stanford University.

== Career ==
He served on the faculty of New York University from 1971 to 1990 before joining Syracuse University as dean of the Newhouse School in July 1990. During his tenure, Rubin helped transform the school by establishing a Career Development Center, later renamed in his honor, and an alumni relations operation that have become models for other units at Syracuse University. He created a new faculty rank that allowed top professionals from the industry to bring their expertise and assume full-time faculty positions at the university without the pressure of a research agenda. He helped set up fellowships to increase the number of minority students with non-journalism backgrounds. He also helped transform the school into one of the most selective communications schools in the country.

Rubin was responsible for initiating the Mirror Awards recognizing excellence in the media industry, which is sponsored by the Newhouse School. He also helped secure funding for the design and construction of the Newhouse III building from Donald Newhouse, with whom Rubin had forged a friendship since arriving as dean.

After stepping down as dean in July 2008, he rejoined the Newhouse faculty and regularly taught communications and arts journalism courses. At the time of his resignation, he was tied the longest-serving communications dean in the United States.

In addition to his academic career, he also hosted a TV show on WCNY-TV named "Ivory Tower", a round-table discussion TV program that focuses on news and events from the diverse perspectives of faculty from colleges and universities across Central New York. The program first aired in 2002 with Rubin as the moderator, with over 500 shows aired as of 2015. Rubin retired from the program in 2016.

Rubin also served on the jury of the Pulitzer Prize.

== Personal life ==
Rubin retired from teaching in December 2016 and relocated to Summerville, South Carolina, just outside of Charleston, with his wife, Tina Press. Rubin and his wife are involved in Dorchester County politics and write the blog for Dorchester County Democratic Party.
