= History of the Jews in the Netherlands =

Dutch Jews
- The location of the Netherlands (dark green) in Europe

Total population
- 41,100–45,000 [30,000 (Jewish mother), 15,000 (Jewish father)]

Regions with significant populations
- Amsterdam, Amstelveen, Rotterdam, The Hague

Languages
- Dutch, Hebrew, Yiddish, Ladino

Religion
- Judaism

Related ethnic groups
- Ashkenazi Jews, Sephardi Jews

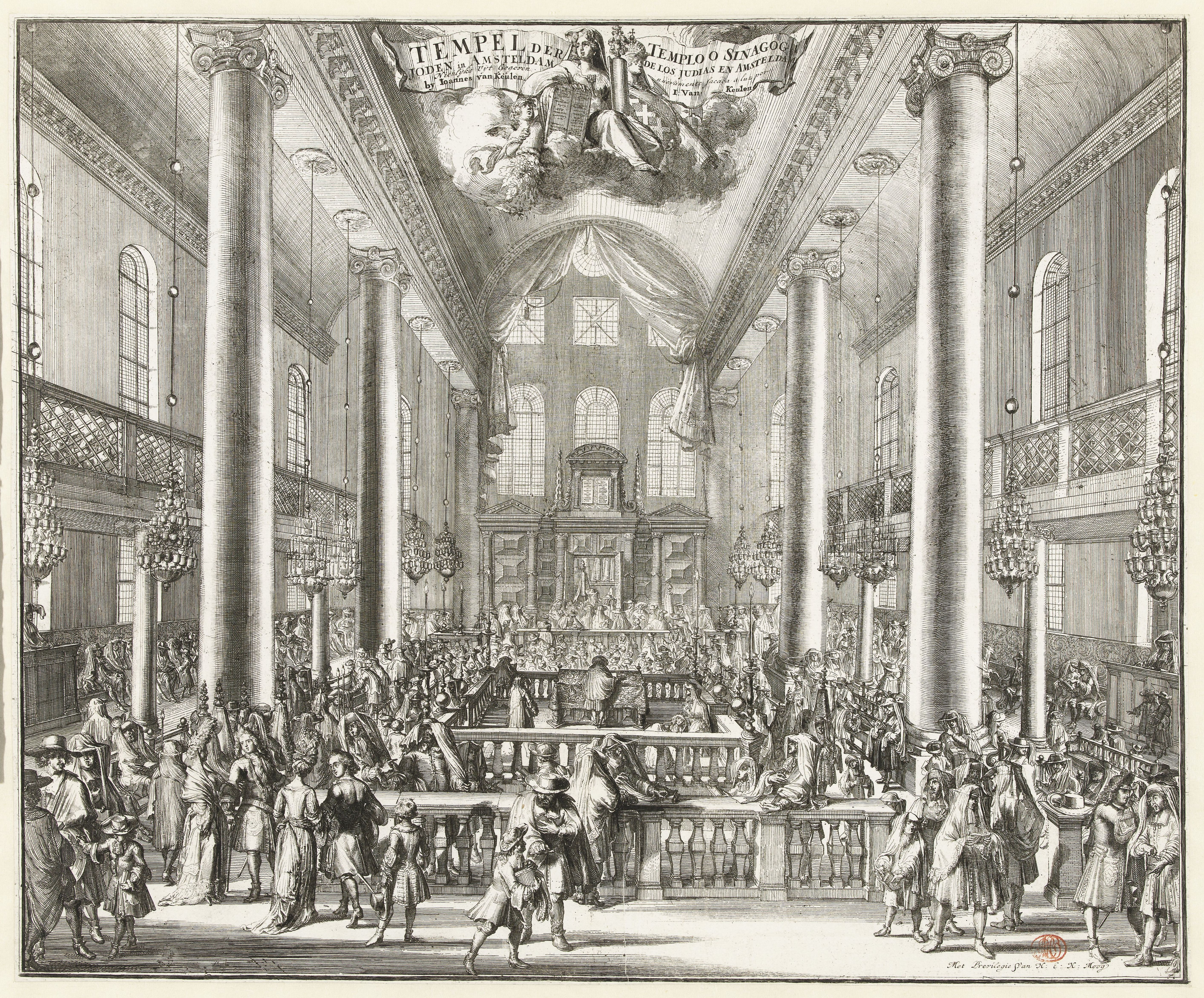
Interior of the Portuguese Synagogue, Amsterdam in 1695 by Romeyn de Hooghe

The history of the Jews in the Netherlands largely dates to the late 16th century and 17th century, when Sephardic Jews from Portugal and Spain began to settle in Amsterdam and a few other Dutch cities, because the Netherlands at that time was a rare center of religious tolerance. Since Portuguese Jews had not lived under rabbinic authority for decades, the first generation of those embracing their ancestral religion had to be formally instructed in Jewish belief and practice. This contrasts with Ashkenazi Jews from central Europe, who, although persecuted, lived in organized communities. Seventeenth-century Amsterdam was referred to as the "Dutch Jerusalem" for its importance as a center of Jewish life. In the mid 17th century, Ashkenazi Jews from central and eastern Europe migrated. Both groups migrated for reasons of religious liberty, to escape persecution, now able to live openly as Jews in separate organized, autonomous Jewish communities under rabbinic authority. They were also drawn by the economic opportunities in the Netherlands, a major hub in world trade.

The Netherlands was once part of the Spanish Empire, as part of the Burgundian inheritance of Charles V, Holy Roman Emperor. In 1581, the Northern Dutch provinces declared independence from Catholic Spain, touching off an extended conflict with the Spanish. A principal motive was to practice Protestant Christianity, then forbidden under Spanish rule. Religious tolerance, "freedom of conscience", was an essential principle of the newly independent state. Portuguese Jews, "Hebrews of the Portuguese Nation", strongly identified ethnically as Portuguese and viewed Ashkenazi Jews with ambivalence in the early modern period. The fortunes and size of the Portuguese Jewish community declined after Dutch trade was undermined by wars with the English in the late 17th century. Simultaneously the Ashkenazi population grew rapidly and has remained dominant in numbers ever since.

Following the end of the Dutch Republic, the French-influenced Batavian Republic, emancipated the Jews in 1796, making them full citizens. Under the monarchy established by Napoleon Bonaparte, King Louis Napoleon removed all disciplinary powers of the Jewish communal leaders parnasim over their communities, making them functionaries of the state.

By 1940, there were around 140,000 Jews in the Netherlands. During Nazi occupation in World War II, the Holocaust in the Netherlands was particularly brutal, with approximately 75 percent of the Jewish population deported to concentration and extermination camps, most famously Anne Frank, whose German Jewish family fled to Amsterdam. Only around 35,000 Jews in Dutch soil survived the war. The Jewish Historical Museum in Amsterdam, housed in a former synagogue, has a major collection relating to Jewish history in the Netherlands. Starting in the late twentieth century, there are official public spaces marking the Holocaust in the Netherlands, including the Dutch National Holocaust Museum, inaugurated by the Dutch king in 2024.

== Before the Dutch Republic ==
It was likely that the earliest Jews arrived in the "Low Countries" (present-day Belgium and the Netherlands) during the Roman conquest early in the common era. Little is known about these early settlers, other than they were not very numerous. For some time, the Jewish presence consisted of, at most, small isolated communities and scattered families. Reliable documentary evidence dates only from the 1100s; for several centuries, the record reflects that the Jews were persecuted within the region and expelled on a regular basis. Early sources from the 11th and 12th centuries mention official debates or disputations between Christians and Jews, in which attempts were made to convince the Jews of the truth of Christianity and to try to convert them. They were documented in the other provinces at an earlier date, especially after their expulsion from France in 1321 and the persecutions in Hainaut and the Rhine provinces. The first Jews in the province of Gelderland were reported in 1325. Jews have been settled in Nijmegen, the oldest settlement, in Doesburg, Zutphen and in Arnhem since 1404. As of the 13th century, there are sources that indicate that Jews were living in Brabant and Limburg, mainly in cities such as Brussels, Leuven, Tienen and the Jewish street of Maastricht (Dutch spelling: Jodenstraat (Maastricht)) from 1295 is another old proof of their existence.

Sources from the 14th century also mention Jewish residents in the cities of Antwerp and Mechelen and in the northern region of Geldern.

Between 1347 and 1351, Europe was hit by the plague or Black Death. This resulted in a new theme in medieval antisemitic rhetoric. The Jews were held responsible for the epidemic and for the way it was rapidly spreading, because presumably they were the ones who had poisoned the water of springs used by the Christians. Various medieval chronicles mention this, e.g., those of Radalphus de Rivo (c. 1403) of Tongeren, who wrote that Jews were murdered in the Brabant region and in the city of Zwolle because they were accused of spreading the Black Death. This accusation was added to other traditional blood libels against the Jews. They were accused of piercing the Host used for communion and killing Christian children to use as a blood offering during Passover. Local Jewish communities were often murdered in part or entirely or exiled in hysterical pogroms. In May 1370, six Jews were burned at the stake in Brussels because they were accused of theft and of desecrating the Holy Sacrament. In addition, documentation can be found of instances in which Jews were abused and insulted, e.g., in the cities of Zutphen, Deventer and Utrecht, for allegedly desecrating the Host. Rioters massacred the majority of the Jews in the region and expelled those who survived.

In 1349, the Duke of Guelders was authorized by the Emperor Louis IV of the Holy Roman Empire to receive Jews in his duchy, where they provided services, paid a tax, and were protected by the law. In Arnhem, where a Jewish physician is mentioned, the magistrate defended him against the hostilities of the populace. When Jews settled in the diocese of Utrecht is unknown, but rabbinical records regarding Jewish dietary laws speculated that the Jewish community there dated to Roman times. In 1444, Jews were expelled from the city of Utrecht. Until 1789, Jews were prohibited from staying in the city overnight. They were tolerated in the village of Maarssen, two hours distant, though their condition was not fortuitous. But, the community of Maarssen was one of the most important Jewish settlements in the Netherlands. Jews were admitted to Zeeland by Albert, Duke of Bavaria.

In 1477, by the marriage of Mary of Burgundy to the Archduke Maximilian, son of Emperor Frederick III, the Netherlands were united to Austria and its possessions passed to the crown of Spain. In the sixteenth century, owing to the persecutions of Charles V and Philip II of Spain, the Netherlands became involved in a series of desperate and heroic struggles against this growing political and Catholic religious hegemony. In 1522, Charles V issued a proclamation in Gelderland and Utrecht against Christians who were suspected of being lax in the faith, as well as against Jews who had not been baptized. He repeated such edicts in 1545 and 1549, trying to suppress the Protestant Reformation, which was expanding. In 1571, the Duke of Alba notified the authorities of Arnhem that all Jews living there should be seized and held until their fates were determined.

At Dutch request, Matthias, Holy Roman Emperor established religious peace in most of the provinces.

== Dutch Republic ==
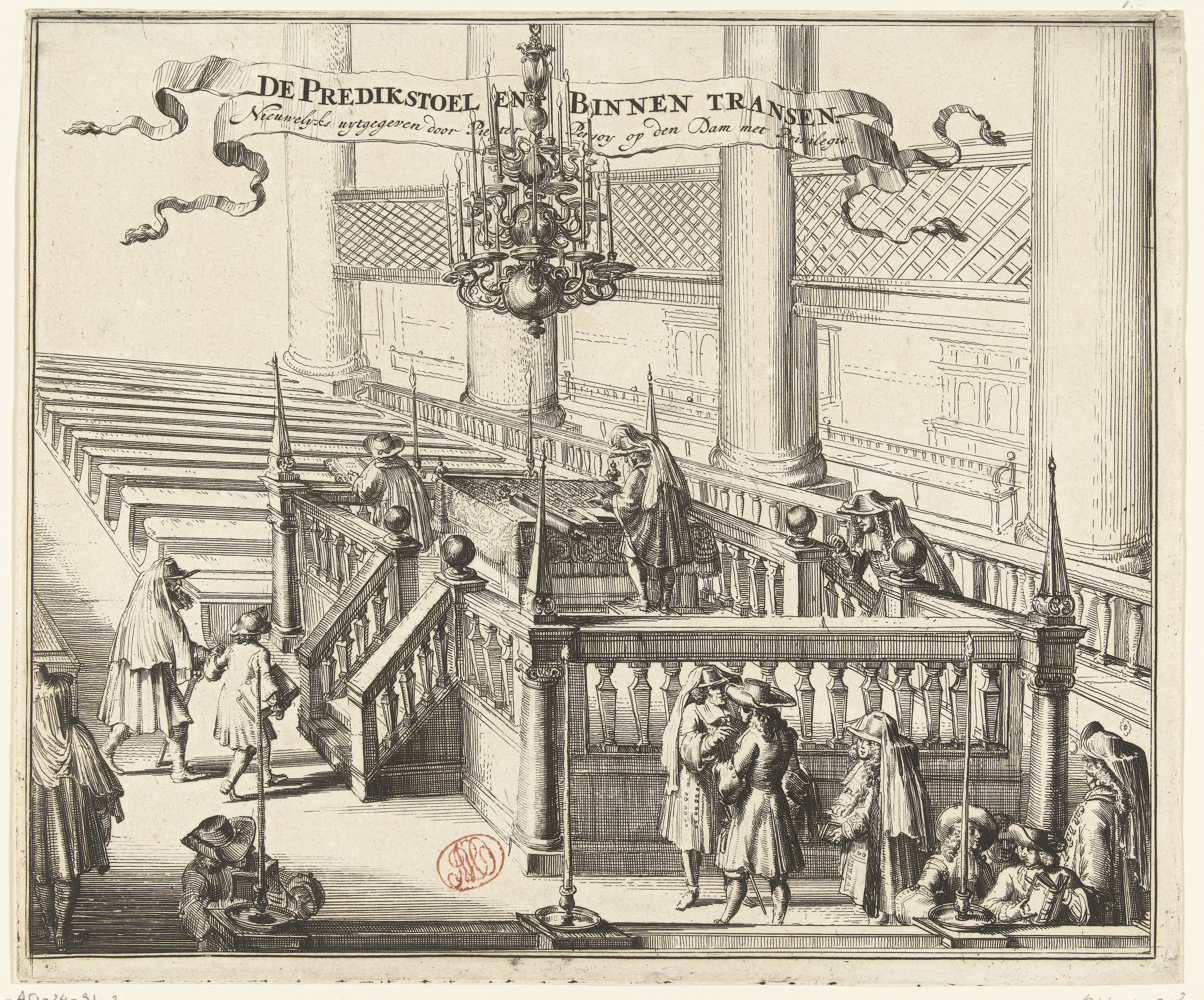
Bima in the Amsterdam Esnoga 1695 by Romeyn de Hooghe

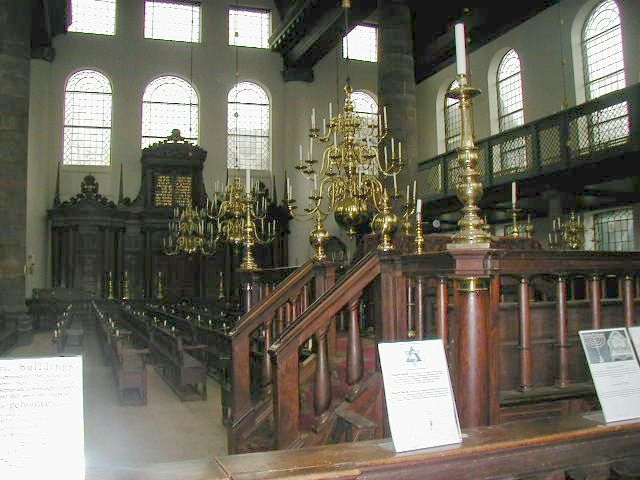
Interior of the Amsterdam Esnoga, the synagogue for the Portuguese-Israelite (Sephardic) community. It was inaugurated 2 August 1675 and is still in use by the Jewish community.

The Dutch Golden Age of the seventeenth century was also the golden age of Portuguese Jews in the Netherlands. From the early migration of Portuguese immigrants, establishment of the Portuguese Jewish community in Amsterdam, prosperity and commercial networks connecting Amsterdam to the larger Atlantic world, and precipitous decline of the community after the series of Anglo-Dutch wars in the late seventeenth century, Amsterdam was called the "Dutch Jerusalem".

=== Migration to the Netherlands ===
Two events brought Jews to the Netherlands. The 1579 Union of Utrecht of the Northern provinces of the Netherlands guaranteed freedom of conscience in article 13 formalizing their political arrangement. In 1581, the deputies of the United Provinces declared independence from Spain by issuing the Act of Abjuration, which deposed King Philip as their sovereign. Philip was a fierce defender of Catholic orthodoxy and was now also the monarch of Portugal, invigorating the Portuguese Inquisition. Portuguese Jews sought a religious haven, which the northern Netherlands appeared to be, as well as a location with commercial opportunities. In the late sixteenth century, the Dutch Republic was not necessarily the obvious destination, since there was no established Jewish community for Portuguese New Christians (conversos) to move if they wished to re-judaize after outwardly living as Christians.

The early history of Sephardi community formation in the Netherlands is "a matter of speculation", but is rooted in Spanish and Portuguese religious history. In Spain under the Catholic Monarchs Jews who refused conversion to Christianity were expelled in 1492 under the Alhambra Decree, with many leaving for the more tolerant Kingdom of Portugal. However, Portuguese Edicts of 1496 and 1497 of King Manuel forced Jews to convert but also blocked their leaving the kingdom. In Spain, converted Jews called conversos or New Christians came under the jurisdiction of the Inquisition, which was vigilant against their continuing to practice Judaism in secret, as crypto-Jews, or the pejorative term Marrano. In Portugal there was no already established Portuguese Inquisition. Jews forced to convert did not immediately face penalties for privately practicing Judaism while publicly being Catholics, so that there continued to be a strong Jewish presence there.

The Portuguese Jewish men migrating to Amsterdam, many of whom were merchants, had an extremely high literacy rate compared to Dutch men in the general population. Portuguese Jewish merchants had already settled in Antwerp in the southern Netherlands, an entrepôt for trade in Iberian commodities, such as sugar, silver bullion, spices, and tobacco. They also settled in France; Hamburg, and a few in London. Amsterdam was not necessarily the obvious destination in the late sixteenth century for Jewish merchants. As the Spanish Netherlands became a hub of international commerce, Portuguese Jews moved to Antwerp and later Amsterdam to pursue commercial opportunities.

As the northern provinces became a Protestant stronghold, Dutch rebels fought for their independence from Spain and religious tolerance as a principle, effectively achieving autonomy, which was finally recognized by Spain in 1648 after the Eighty Years' War. In the late 16th century, some Sephardic Jews from the Iberian peninsula (Sepharad is the Hebrew name for Iberia) started to settle in the Netherlands, especially Amsterdam, gaining a foothold, but with an unclear status. A few Ashkenazi Jews had migrated from Germany to the Ommelands in the 1570s and in the mid to late 17th century Ashkenazi Jews from central Europe begin to migrate in greater numbers. Although persecuted in central Europe, Ashkenazi Jews had lived as Jews before migrating to the Netherlands. The first group of Jews of any numbers in Groningen was in Appingedam in 1563, where they came into conflict with Dutch guilds for sales of meat and cloth. Emden provided the Amsterdam Portuguese emigrants with their first rabbi, Moses Uri Halevi (a.k.a. Philps Joosten), until that community was established enough to begin training Portuguese men for the rabbinate. The two communities were ethnically distinct within Judaism, with separate religious organizations.

=== Religious tolerance and establishment of Jewish communities ===
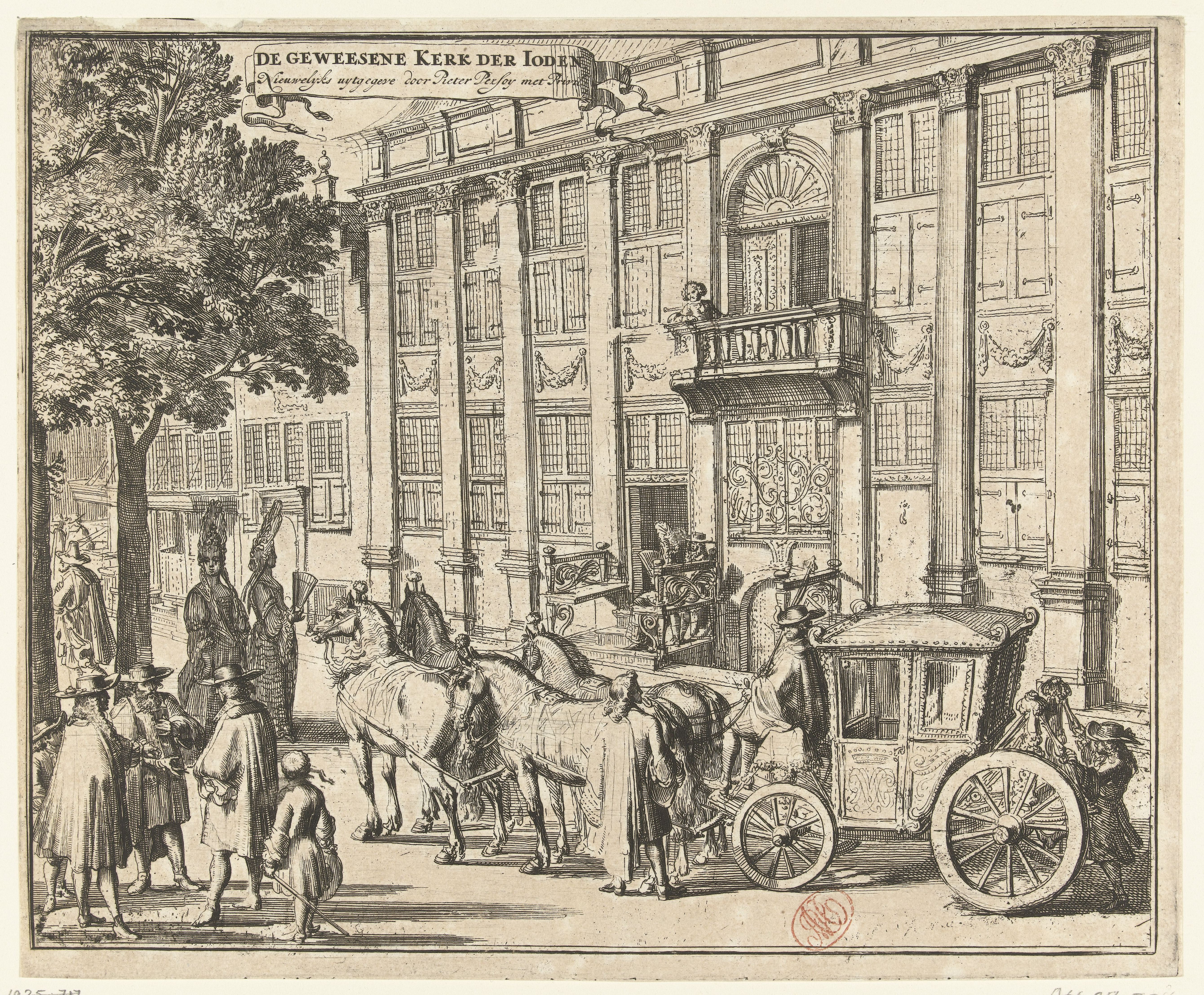
Exterior of the Portuguese synagogue in Amsterdam, c. 1695, showing the social context of the wealthy community. by Romeyn de Hooghe

The Dutch provinces provided mostly favorable conditions for observant Jews to establish a community, and to practice their religion privately. But to establish a Jewish community, a rabbi needed to be brought to Amsterdam. No such rabbi existed among the Portuguese conversos. Those wishing to live as Jews under rabbinic authority needed to learn Jewish religious and cultural practices. The first rabbi was Moses Uri Halevi of Emden, part of the small Ashkenazi settlement there. He established Jewish practices in the absence of a dedicated worship space. He brought with him from Emden a Torah scroll, essential for Jewish worship.

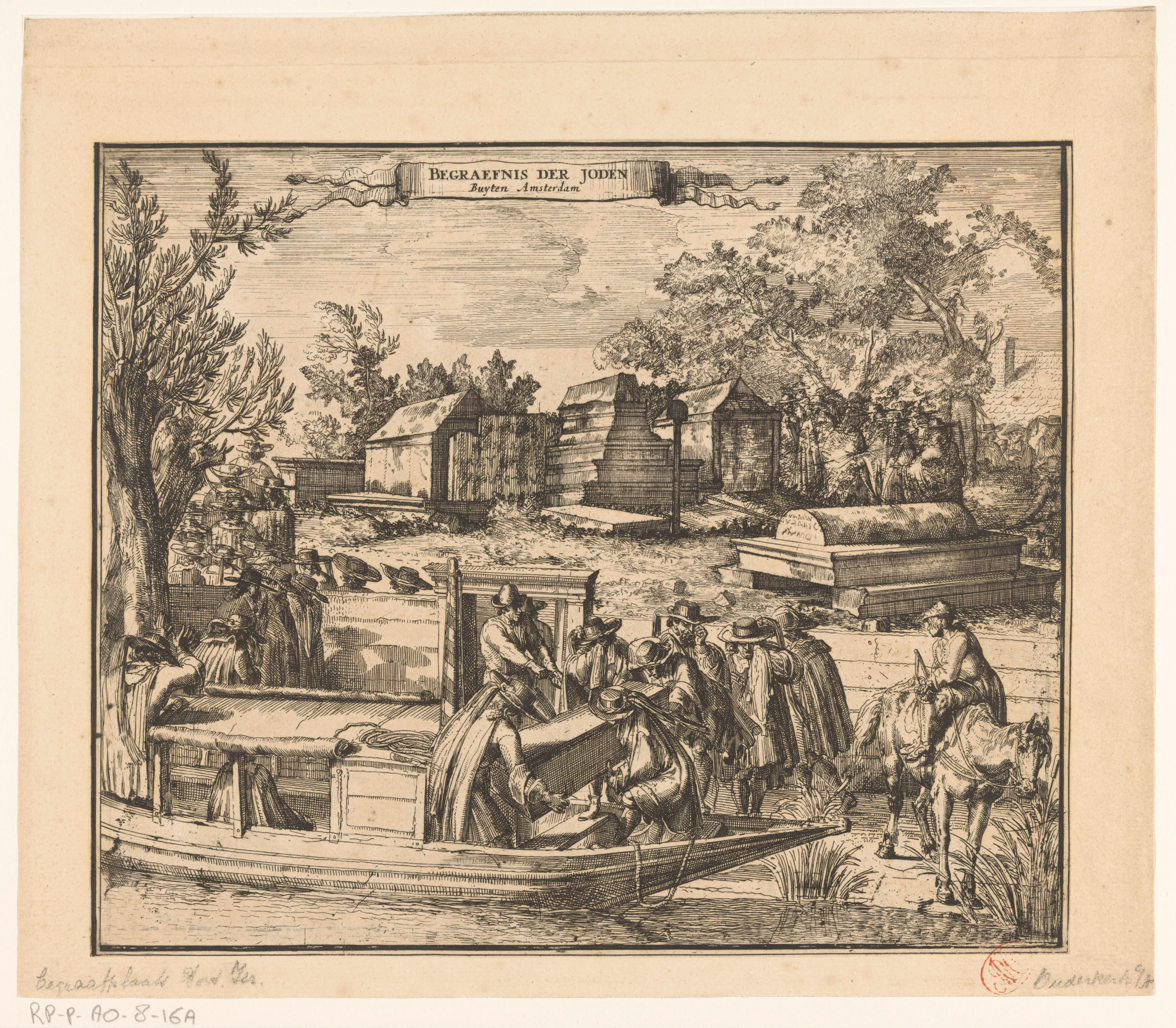
Conveying a body to the Jewish cemetery in Amsterdam. c. 1695 by Romeyn de Hooghe

Creating a sacred space for Jewish worship was initially a problem, since Amsterdam authorities did not envision Jews to be included in the notion of religious toleration. Jacob Tirado (a.k.a.) James Lopes da Costa, who obtained permission from the authorities to practice Judaism within his household, but not publicly. Tirado was a significant contributor to the establishment of the Portuguese Jewish community. Three Portuguese congregations were created in the early seventeenth century, which merged and in the late seventeenth century and built the large Portuguese synagogue, the Esnoga, still in use today.

Also necessary for a functioning Jewish community was having a Jewish burial ground. In Amsterdam, they were initially denied rights to one in 1606 and 1608 with no explanation, and they buried their dead in Groet. but eventually secured land in Ouderkerk for Portuguese Jewish burials. The cemetery was five miles south of central Amsterdam. The burial of the maternal grandfather of Baruch Spinoza, Henrique Garces (alias Baruch Senior) provides some insight into questions of eligibility to be buried in this cemetery. When he moved from Antwerp to Amsterdam, he requested permission to be buried in the cemetery; however, he did not participate in worship at either of the then existing congregations. He remained uncircumcised his entire life, but before his burial in the Oudekerk cemetery, he was circumcised posthumously. Garces was burial place was located outside of the formal boundaries of the cemetery, in "a fringe reserved for uncircumcised marginal types not fully belonging to the community." Tombstones in numerous Jewish burial grounds provide useful information on individual Jewish men and women as well as the Jewish communities as a whole until 1796, when Jews were granted citizenship and no longer segregated.

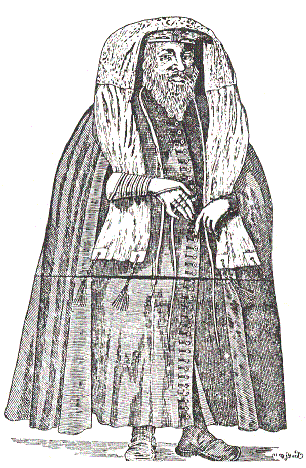
Rabbi Saul Levi Morteira

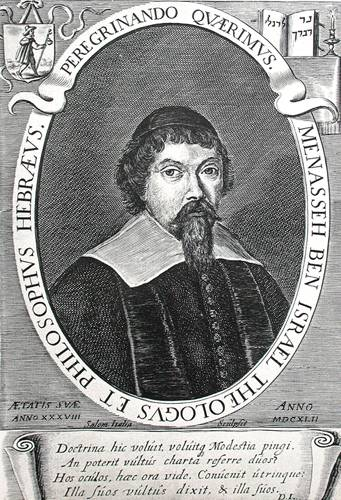
Rabbi Menasseh Ben Israel

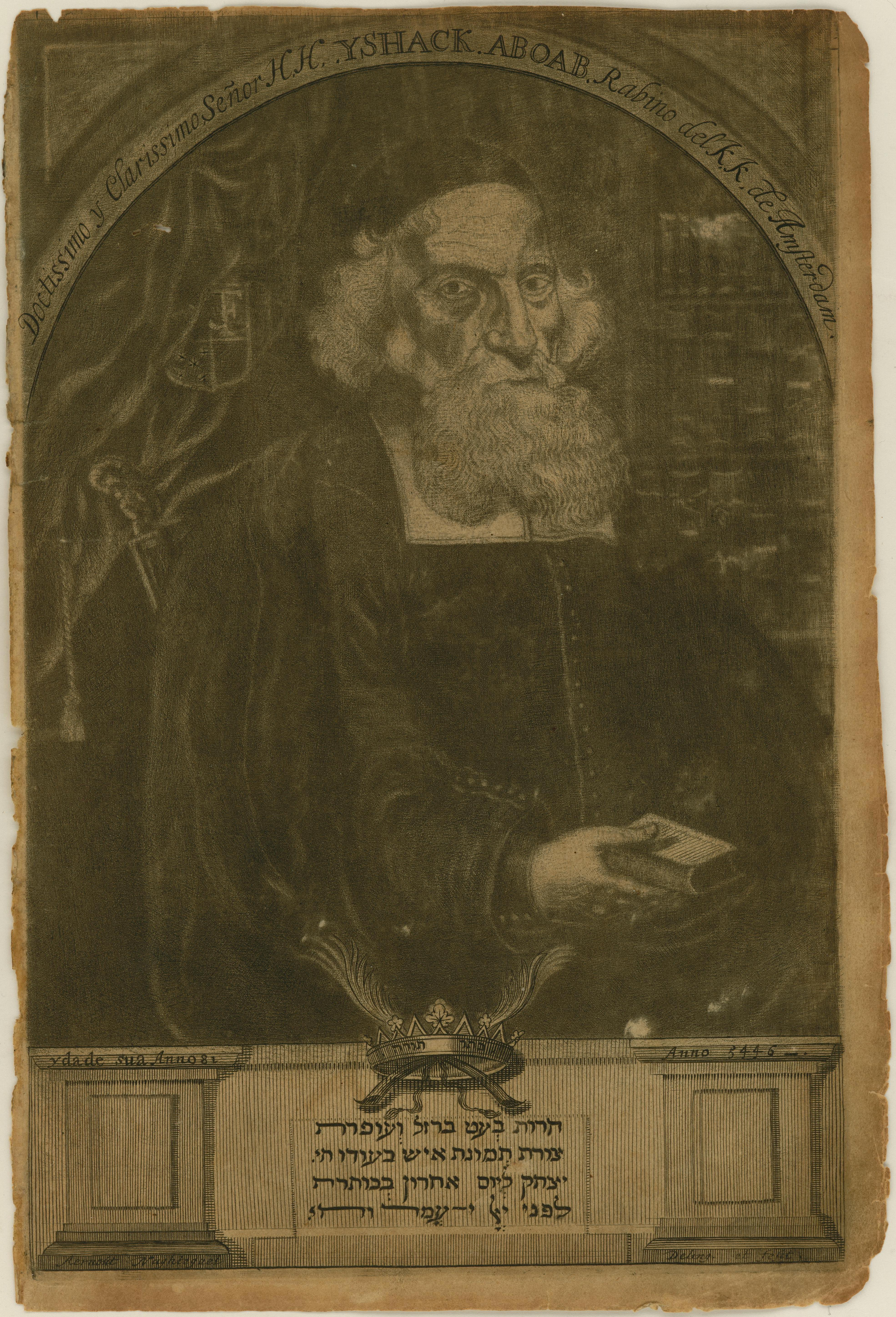
Rabbi Isaac Aboab da Fonseca

Religious toleration was not written into law in the United Provinces with much specificity. A 1616 statute of the Amsterdam burgomasters was the first and only such formal statement, remaining in force until the emancipation of the Jews in 1795–96. Jews were forbidden from openly criticizing Christianity; could not attempt to convert Christians to Judaism or to circumcise one. Jews could buy but not inherit citizenship. Jews could not engage in a trade or profession protected by Dutch guilds in which citizenship was required. Jewish men were forbidden from having "carnal conversations" with Christian women of any kind, including as marital partners or sex workers. Prohibitions of sexual contact between Jewish men and Christian women prompted the statute. There were many cases of Christian women bringing lawsuits against Portuguese Jewish men for childbirth expanses and/or child support. Unlike other places in Europe, Amsterdam had no prohibition against Jews employing Christian servants, remarked upon by German visitors to Amsterdam. The intimacy of domestic interiors provided the opportunity for such sexual contact. There was no prohibition against Jewish women marrying Christian men.

Amsterdam had no existing residential quarter for Jews, since it was a new immigrant group to the city. The city itself was full of immigrants from other areas, so the Jews did not particularly stand out initially. In Amsterdam Jews tended to settle together in a particular area but were not restricted to it. The Dutch practice was to require Jews to secure a domiciliation permit and pay an annual fee for residence. Some wealthy Portuguese Jews in seventeenth-century Amsterdam had houses amongst the very wealthy Dutch merchants.

=== Occupations and professions ===
Portuguese Jewish men had a narrow range of economic pursuits in the period 1655–1699, the largest being merchants at 72%, with 498 of the nearly 693 men whose occupation was listed in records. Adjacent to merchants were 31 brokers. There were a scattering of others in professions, with teachers (22), physicians (10), and surgeons (10) topping the list. There were skilled diamond cutters and polishers (20) and men connected to the tropical product tobacco, with 13 retail tobacconists, and 13 tobacco workers. Physicians included Samuel Abravanel, David Nieto, Elijah Montalto, and the Bueno family. Joseph Bueno was consulted in the illness of Prince Maurice in April 1623. Jews were admitted as students to the university, where they studied medicine as the only branch of science that was of practical use to them. They were not allowed to practice law, because lawyers were required to take a Christian oath, thereby excluding them. Jews were also excluded from the trade guilds, as in a 1632 resolution passed by the city of Amsterdam (the Dutch cities were largely autonomous). However, they were allowed to practice certain trades: printing, bookselling, and selling meat, poultry, groceries, and medicines. In 1655 a Sephardic Jew was exceptionally permitted to establish a sugar refinery using chemical methods.

There are a number of notable Sephardic Jews in Amsterdam in the 17th century, including Saul Levi Morteira, a rabbi and anti-Christian polemicist. His rival was the much more well-known Amsterdam rabbi Menasseh Ben Israel. He was known for corresponding widely with Christian leaders and helped to promote Jewish resettlement in England. The most famous is philosopher Benedictus de Spinoza (Baruch Spinoza), born and raised a Portuguese Jew in Amsterdam, was excommunicated from the Jewish community in 1656. He openly rejected rabbinic authority. He expressed unorthodox ideas concerning (the nature of) God; questioned the divine origin of Scripture; and rejected Mosaic law. He published a major portion of his ideas anonymously in Latin in 1670, but following his 1677 death, his entire corpus was published and widely circulated.

=== Jewish women ===
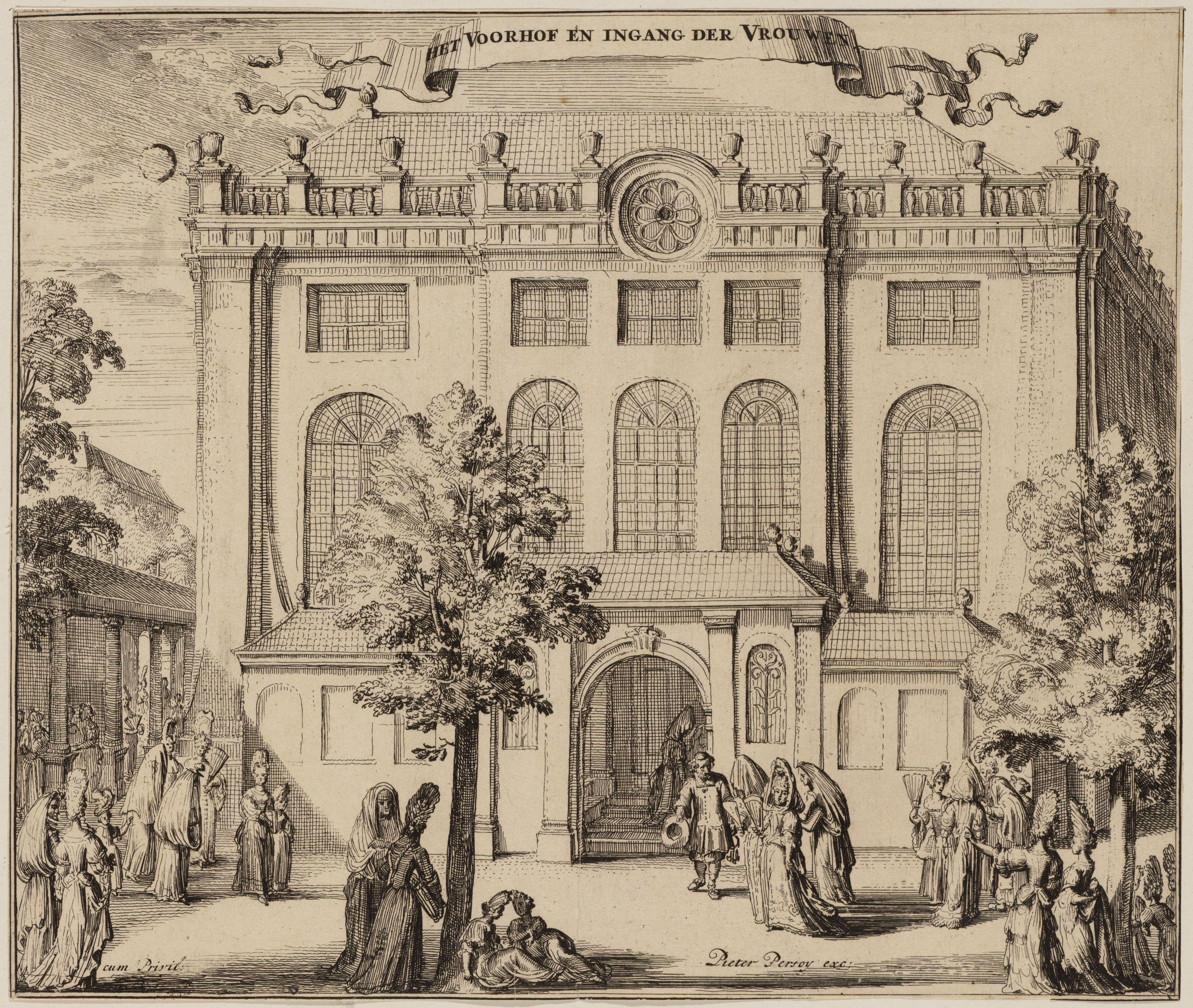
Women's entrance to the Portuguese Synagogue, Romeyn de Hooghe

Jewish women, as with most non-Jewish women at the time, generally did not participate in the workforce outside of the domestic interior. There is some data on women immigrants. In the early years of community formation, there was a scarcity of brides, so men sought eligible women in other Jewish communities. Antwerp was a source for brides, and they appear to have been of higher status than Jewish women born elsewhere, using literacy rates as a way to infer status. The percentage of illiterate women 1598–1699 was lowest among those few (3 out of 41) from Antwerp or 7.3%, with Hamburg second lowest at 18.2% (10 out of 55). Amsterdam-born women were the largest number with 227 out of 725 or 31.8%, which compared favorably with Dutch Amsterdam women, at 68%. A source for discerning literacy is the marriage register, where literacy could be assessed. The decline in literacy of Amsterdam-born Jewish women may be due to the undervaluation of women's literacy in the Amsterdam Jewish community. In the religious sphere, women did not count for a minyan; Jewish women did not have an unmitigated right to pray in the synagogue. Women and unmarried men were not permitted to be elected to the governing body of the synagogue, the Mahamad. Widows and orphaned girls were supported by Jewish charities. Irregular relationships between Jewish men and women were punished by the Mahamad, including bigamy. The Mahamad punished Jewish couples who married without their parents' permission, along with the witnesses to the ceremony, as a flouting of authority. Married Jewish women abandoned by their husbands sometimes became pregnant in adulterous relationships with Jewish men. In the eighteenth century, the Mahamad acted when apprised of the circumstances. The leadership went out of their way to identify the children of such relationships as illegitimate in the communal birth registry.

=== Portuguese Jewish merchants and Dutch prosperity ===
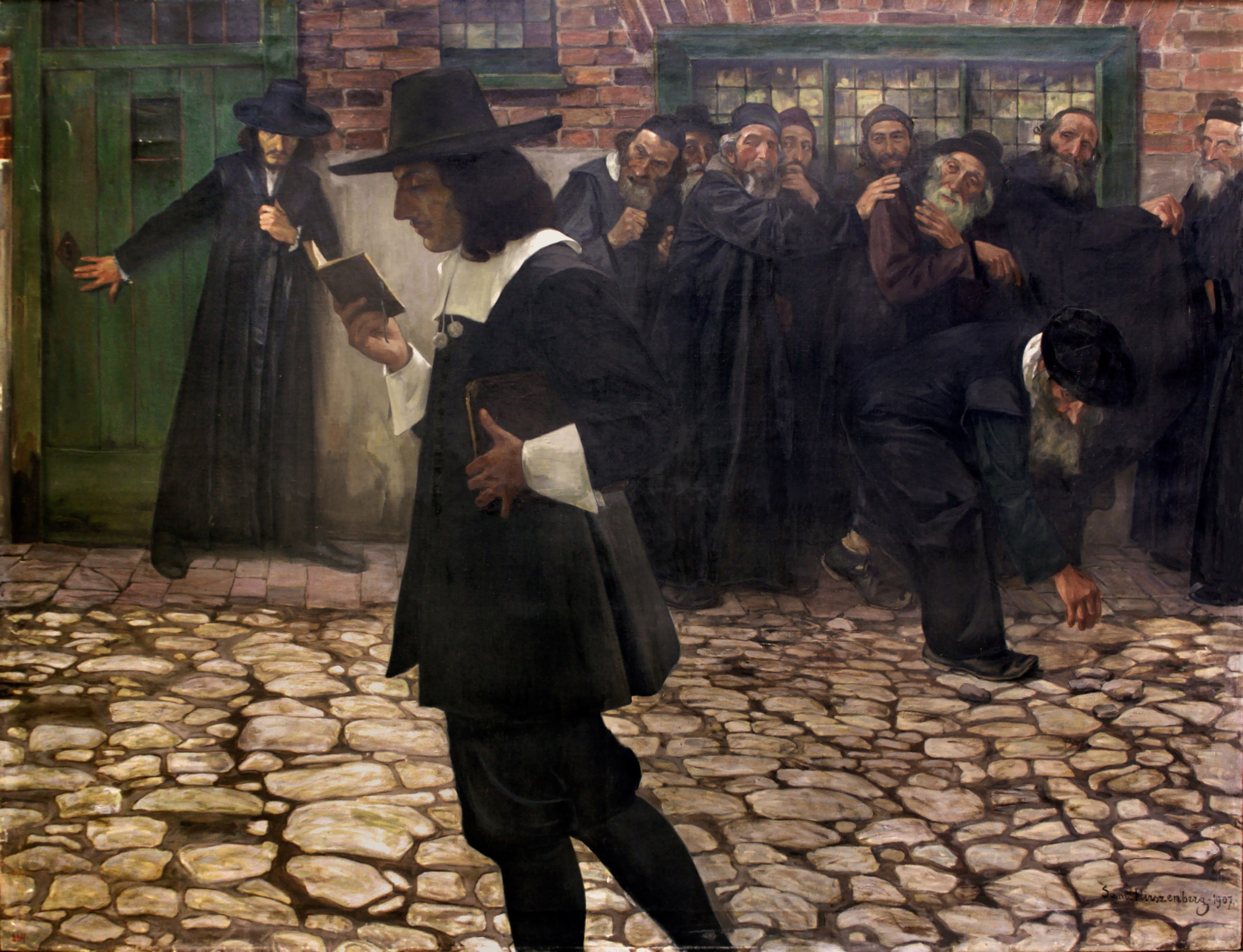
Philosopher Baruch Spinoza was raised in the Amsterdam Portuguese Jewish community, but he was expelled for his radical beliefs and direct challenge to rabbinic authorities.

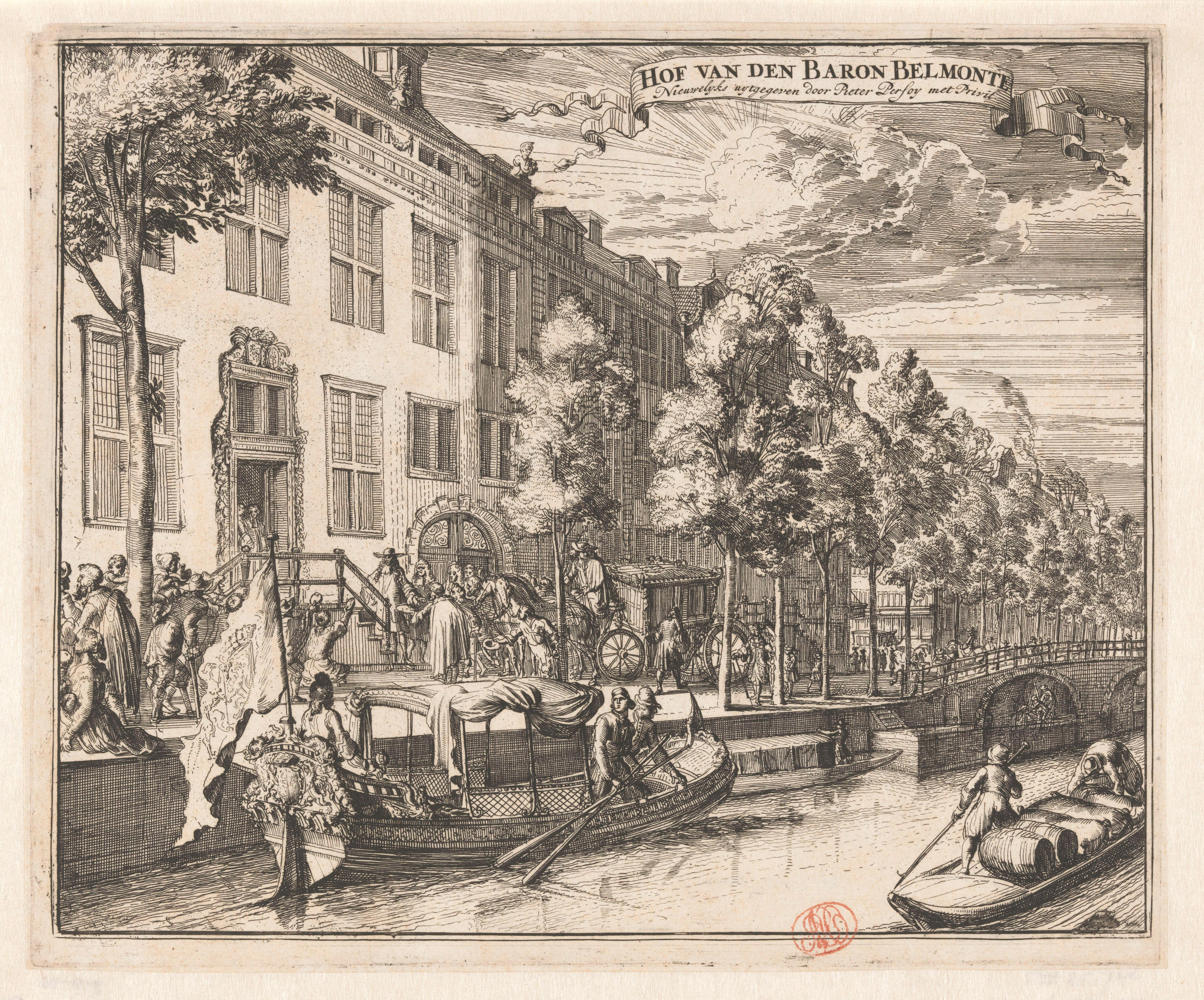
Home of Baron Manuel de Belmonte (alias Isaac Nunes) in Amsterdam, Romeyn de Hooghe c. 1695

There were no prohibitions on Jews participating in economic activity and Portuguese Jewish merchants were prominent in Amsterdam. The city prospered because of religious toleration, which Spinoza, Amsterdam's most famous Jewish-born denizen, praised;

The city of Amsterdam reaps the fruit of this freedom [of conscience] in its own great prosperity and in the admiration of all other people. For in this most flourishing state and splendid city, men of every nation and religion live together in the greatest of harmony ... His religion is considered of no importance: for it has no effect before the judges in gaining or losing a cause, and there is no sect so despised that its followers, provided that they harm no one, pay every man his due, and live uprightly, are deprived of the protection of the magisterial authority.

As they became established, they collectively brought new trading expertise and commercial connections to the city. They also brought navigation knowledge and techniques from Portugal, which enabled the Netherlands to start competing in overseas trade with the Spanish and Portuguese colonies. "Jews of the Portuguese Nation" worked in common cause with the people of Amsterdam and contributed materially to the prosperity of the country; they were strong supporters of the House of Orange and were protected by the Stadholder. During the Twelve Years' Truce, the commerce of the Dutch Republic increased considerably, and a period of strong development ensued. This was particularly true for Amsterdam, where the Marranos had established their main port and base of operations. They maintained foreign trade relationships in the Mediterranean, including Venice, the Levant and Morocco. The Sultan of Morocco had an ambassador at The Hague named Samuel Pallache, through whose mediation, in 1620, a commercial understanding was reached with the Barbary States.

The Sephardic Jews of Amsterdam also established trade relationships with other countries in Europe. In the early 1620s numerous Jews migrated from Holland to the Lower Elbe region. In a letter dated 25 November 1622, King Christian IV of Denmark invited Jews of Amsterdam to settle in Glückstadt, where, among other privileges, they were assured the free exercise of their religion.

The trade developed between the Dutch and Spanish Caribbean and South America was established by such Iberian Jews. They also contributed to establishing the Dutch West Indies Company in 1621, and some of them sat on its directorate. The ambitious schemes of the Dutch for the conquest of Brazil were carried into effect by Francisco Ribeiro, a Portuguese captain, who is said to have had Jewish relations in Holland. The Sephardic Jews of Amsterdam strongly supported the Dutch Republic in its struggle with Portugal for the possession of Brazil, which started in Recife with the arrival of Count Johan Maurits of Nassau-Siegen in 1637. Some years later, the Dutch in Brazil appealed for more craftsmen of all kinds, and many Jews heeded the call. In 1642 about 600 Jews left Amsterdam for Brazil, accompanied by two distinguished scholars, Isaac Aboab da Fonseca and Moses Raphael de Aguilar. After the Portuguese regained the territory that Netherlands had taken in the sugar growing region around Recife in 1654, they sought refuge in other Dutch colonies, including the island of Curaçao in the Caribbean and New Amsterdam (Manhattan) in North America.

=== Ashkenazi Jews ===
In the 17th century, the Sephardi community was wealthier and more established institutionally than Ashkenazi Jews. Portuguese Jews looked down on the poorer, less educated Ashkenazi migrants from northern and central Europe. A large influx of Jewish refugees from Lithuania during the 1650s strained the Jewish system of poor relief established by the Portuguese Jews. Many Ashkenazim were drawn to the religiously tolerant and independent Dutch provinces, generally after the mid-17th century. One example could be the Haham Tzvi. Unlike the more central Iberian Jews, most of these were displaced residents of Jewish ghettos escaping persecution. In addition, they were displaced by the violence of the Thirty Year War (1618–1648) in other parts of northern Europe, and local expulsions, as well as the 1648 Khmelnytsky uprising in what was then eastern Poland. These poor immigrants were less welcomed. Their arrival in considerable number threatened the economic status of Amsterdam in particular, and with few exceptions they were turned away. They generally settled in rural areas, where the men typically made a living as peddlers and hawkers. Many smaller Jewish communities were established throughout the Dutch provinces.

Over time, many German Jews gained prosperity through retail trading and they became specialists in diamond-cutting and sales. They had a monopoly in the latter trade until about 1870.

=== Jews and the Dutch state ===
When William IV was proclaimed stadholder (1747), the Jews found another protector. He had close relations with the head of the DePinto family, at whose villa, Tulpenburg, near Ouderkerk, he and his wife paid more than one visit. In 1748, when a French army was at the frontier and the treasury was empty, De Pinto collected a large sum and presented it to the state. Van Hogendorp, the secretary of state, wrote to him: "You have saved the state." In 1750 De Pinto arranged for the conversion of the national debt from a 4 to a 3% basis.

Under the government of William V, the country was troubled by internal dissensions. But the Jews remained loyal to him. As he entered the legislature on the day of his majority, 8 March 1766, in synagogues services of thanks-giving were held. William V visited both the German and the Portuguese synagogues on 3 June 1768. He also attended the marriages of offspring of various prominent Jewish families.

== Batavian Republic and Jewish emancipation ==
The year 1795 brought the results of the French Revolution to the Netherlands, including Jewish emancipation, making them full citizens. The National Convention, on 2 September 1796, proclaimed this resolution: "No Jew shall be excluded from rights or advantages which are associated with citizenship in the Batavian Republic, and which he may desire to enjoy." Moses Moresco was appointed member of the municipality at Amsterdam; Moses Asser member of the court of justice there. The old conservatives, at whose head stood the chief rabbi Jacob Moses Löwenstamm, were not desirous of emancipation rights. Indeed, these rights were for the greater part of doubtful advantage; their culture was not so far advanced that they could frequent ordinary society; besides, this emancipation was offered to them by a party which had expelled their beloved Prince of Orange, to whose house they remained so faithful that the chief rabbi at The Hague, Saruco, was called the "Orange dominie"; the men of the old régime were even called "Orange cattle". Nevertheless, the Revolution appreciably ameliorated the condition of the Jews; in 1799 their congregations received, as with Christian congregations, grants from the treasury. In 1798 Jonas Daniel Meijer interceded with the French minister of foreign affairs on behalf of the Jews of Germany; and on 22 August 1802, the Dutch ambassador, Schimmelpenninck, delivered a note on the same subject to the French minister.

== Nineteenth century to 1940 ==
This period of history between Dutch Republic, the florescence of Jewry in the Netherlands, and outbreak World War II, with the Holocaust having a disproportionate impact on the Netherlands compared to other Western European countries, has had an impact on how the period's history is written. After Jewish emancipation in the Netherlands, Jews increasingly integrated and assimilated into Dutch society and became more secular, as did Dutch society as a whole. Jews did not form a separate segment ("pillar") of Dutch society but became part of others. Although many no longer were observant religiously or had a significant connection to Jewish culture, the non-Jewish Dutch population considered them to be separate. Jews clustered in a small number of economic sectors, including the diamond sector, where Jews traditionally worked, and textiles, where some small-scale Jewish entrepreneurs became industrialists. Both industries became important for general Dutch economy in the era.

=== Kingdom of Holland ===
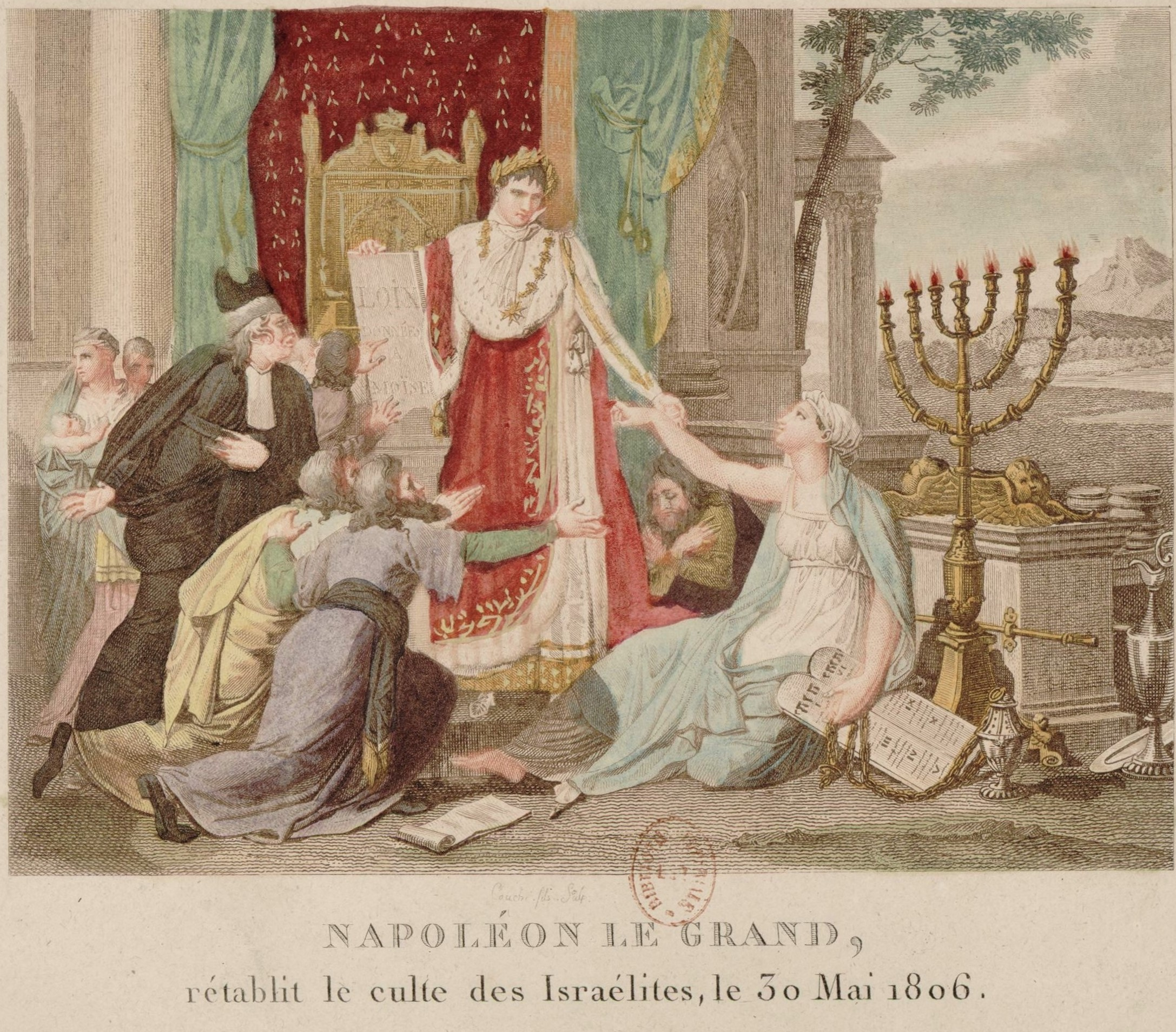
An 1806 French print depicts Napoleon Bonaparte emancipating the Jews.

From 1806 to 1810 the Kingdom of Holland was ruled by the brother of Napoleon, Louis Bonaparte, whose intention it was to so amend the condition of the Jews that their newly acquired rights would become of real value to them; the shortness of his reign, however, prevented him from carrying out his plans. For example, after having changed the market-day in some cities (Utrecht and Rotterdam) from Saturday to Monday, he abolished the use of the "Oath More Judaico" in the courts of justice, and administered the same formula to both Christians and Jews. To accustom the latter to military services he formed two battalions of 803 men and 60 officers, all Jews, who had been until then excluded from military service, even from the town guard.

The union of Ashkenazim and Sephardim intended by Louis Napoleon did not come about. He had desired to establish schools for Jewish children, who were excluded from the public schools; even the Maatschappij tot Nut van 't Algemeen, founded in 1784, did not willingly receive them or admit Jews as members. Among the distinguished Jews of this period were Meier Littwald Lehemon, Mozes Salomon Asser, Capadose, and the physicians David Heilbron, Davids (who introduced vaccination), Stein van Laun (tellurium), and many others.

=== Jews during the Dutch Monarchy to World War II ===
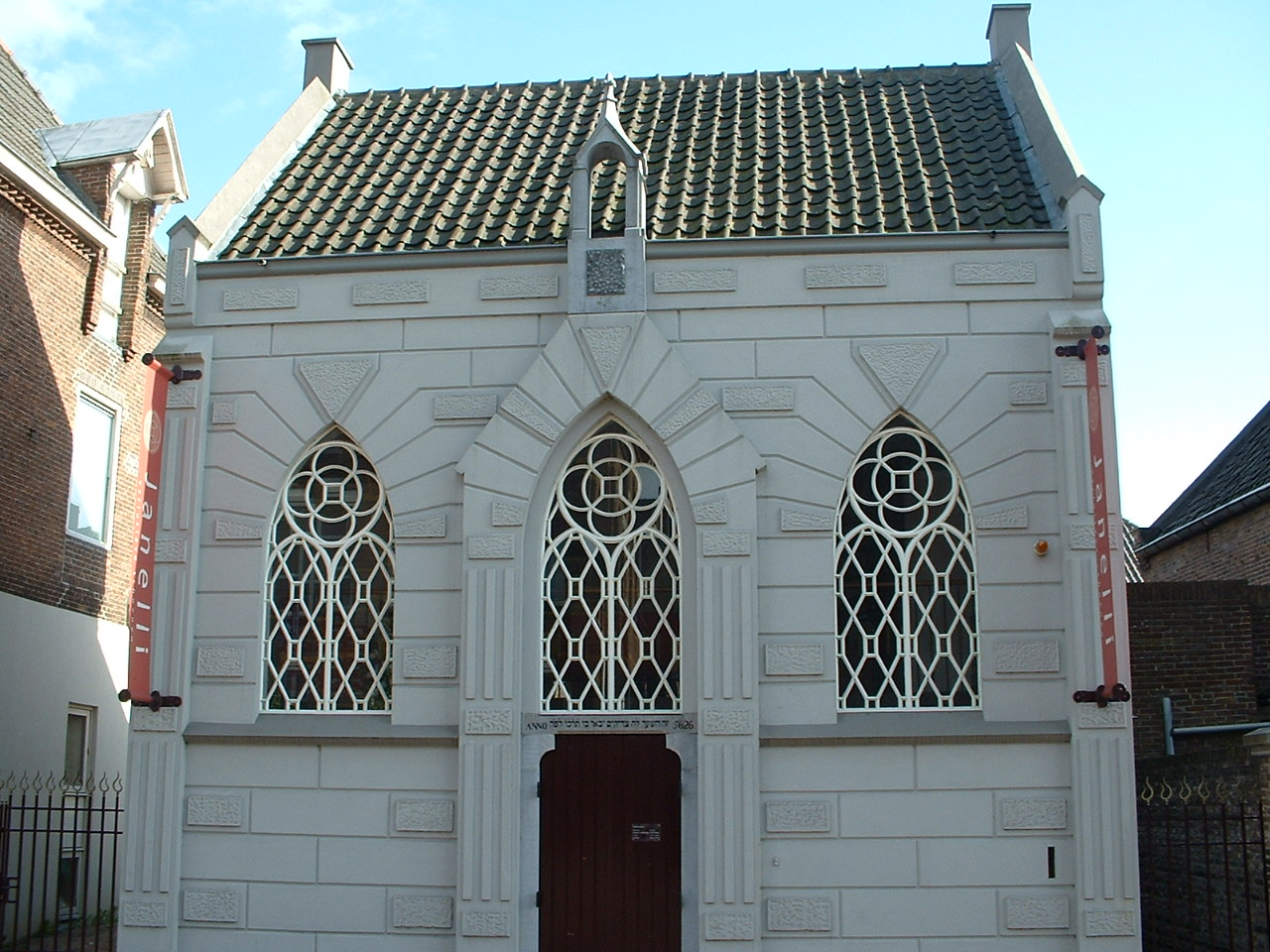
The synagogue in the town of Veghel. The community in Veghel was a small mediene community, which reached its height around 1900. In the years following, the community shrank to some 30 members as people moved to larger cities. All Jews in the town were killed during the Holocaust.

Shortly after William VI arrived at Scheveningen, and was crowned king on 11 December, Chief Rabbi Lehmans of The Hague organized a special thanksgiving service, asking for protection for the allied armies on 5 January 1814. Many Jews fought at Waterloo, where Napoleon was defeated with thirty-five Jewish officers dying there. William VI promulgated a law abolishing the French régime.

Jews could prosper in the independent Netherlands, but not equally. In urban areas, non-Jewish employers to hire Jewish employees. Jews tended to occupy particular sectors of the urban labor market. Jewish men found work in the diamond and tobacco industries, and retail trade; Jewish women worked in sweatshops. Boundaries between Jews and non-Jews (Gentiles) started to blur due to an increase in mixed marriages and residential spreading; decline in religious observance of the Sabbath and keeping kosher; and an increase in Jews' civic involvement and political participation.

The Netherlands, and Amsterdam in particular, remained a major Jewish population centre until World War II. Amsterdam was known as Jerusalem of the West by its Jewish residents. In the late 19th and early 20th century, the community grew as Jews from the mediene (the "country" Jews), migrated to larger cities to seek better jobs and living conditions. By 1900, Amsterdam had 51,000 Jews, with 12,500 paupers; The Hague 5,754 Jews, with 846; Rotterdam 10,000, with 1,750; Groningen 2,400, with 613; Arnhem 1,224 with 349. The total population of the Netherlands in 1900 was 5,104,137, about 2% of whom were Jews.

Dutch Jews were a relatively small part of the population and showed a strong tendency towards internal migration. They never coalesced into a real "pillar". One of the reasons was the attraction of the socialist and liberal "pillars" before the Holocaust, rather than becoming part of a Jewish pillar. Especially the rise of socialism was a new segment in the pillarized Dutch society that attracted and was created by intermarrying Jews, and Jews and Christians who had abandoned their religious affiliation. Religious-ethnic background was of less importance within the socialist and liberal segments, though individuals could maintain some rituals or practices.

The number of Jews in the Netherlands grew at a slightly slower rate than the general population from the early 19th century up to World War II. Between 1830 and 1930, the Jewish population in the Netherlands increased by almost 250% (numbers given by the Jewish communities to the Dutch Census) while the total population of the Netherlands grew by 297%.

Number of Jews in the Netherlands 1830–1966
Year	Number of Jews	Source
1830	46,397	Census*
1840	52,245	Census*
1849	58,626	Census*
1859	63,790	Census*
1869	67,003	Census*
1879	81,693	Census*
1889	97,324	Census*
1899	103,988	Census*
1909	106,409	Census*
1920	115,223	Census*
1930	111,917	Census*
1941	154,887	Nazi occupation**
1947	14,346	Census*
1954	23,723	Commission on Jewish Demography***
1960	14,503	Census*
1966	29,675	Commission on Jewish Demography***

(*) Derived from those persons who stated "Judaism" as their religion in the Dutch Census

(**) Persons with at least one Jewish grandparent. In another Nazi census the total number of people with at least one Jewish grandparent in the Netherlands was put at 160,886: 135,984 people with 4 or 3 Jewish grandparents (counted as "full Jews"); 18,912 Jews with 2 Jewish grandparents ("half Jews"), of whom 3,538 were part of a Jewish congregation; 5,990 with 1 Jewish grandparent ("quarter Jews")

(***) Membership numbers of Dutch Jewish congregations (only those who are Jewish according to the Halakha)

==== Prominent Jews of the era ====
There were a number of prominent Jews in the era. One who had an impact on the Dutch political system was Aletta Jacobs, who was prominent in the fight for women's suffrage. The introduction in 1919 of equal suffrage for men and women was the culmination of a long process. The fact that women had to fight for the right to vote has indirectly to do with Aletta Jacobs. Originally, the law only set a wage limit for voting. Because she was the first female doctor, she met this wage limit and wanted to exercise her right to vote. It was only after her attempt that it was explicitly legislated for women to vote in 1919.

Other prominent Dutch Jews of this era were: Jozef Israëls (painter), Tobias Asser (winner Nobel Peace Prize in 1911), Gerard Philips (founder NV Philips' Gloeilampenfabrieken Philips), Lodewijk Ernst Visser (lawyer and president of the High Council of the Netherlands, Commander in the Order of Orange-Nassau and Knight in the Order of the Dutch Lion), The Brabant Jewish family businesses from Oss, including margarine producer Samuel van den Bergh was one of the founders of Unilever. Saal van Zwanenberg was the producer of the Zwan meat products, but perhaps even better known as the founder of the pharmaceutical company Organon, and thus as the founder of AkzoNobel. The company of Hartog Hartog was acquired by Unilever, the Unox meat products are a continuation of the meat activities of this family business, Simon Philip Goudsmit (founder De Bijenkorf), Leo Meyer and Arthur Isaac (founders HEMA (store)), Leo Fuld (Jewish singer of Rotterdam), Herman Woudstra (founder Hollandia Matzes formerly: "Paaschbroodfabriek" in Enschede), Eduard Meijers (lawyer and founder of the current Burgerlijk Wetboek (Civil Code of the Netherlands)).

== World War II to the late twentieth century ==
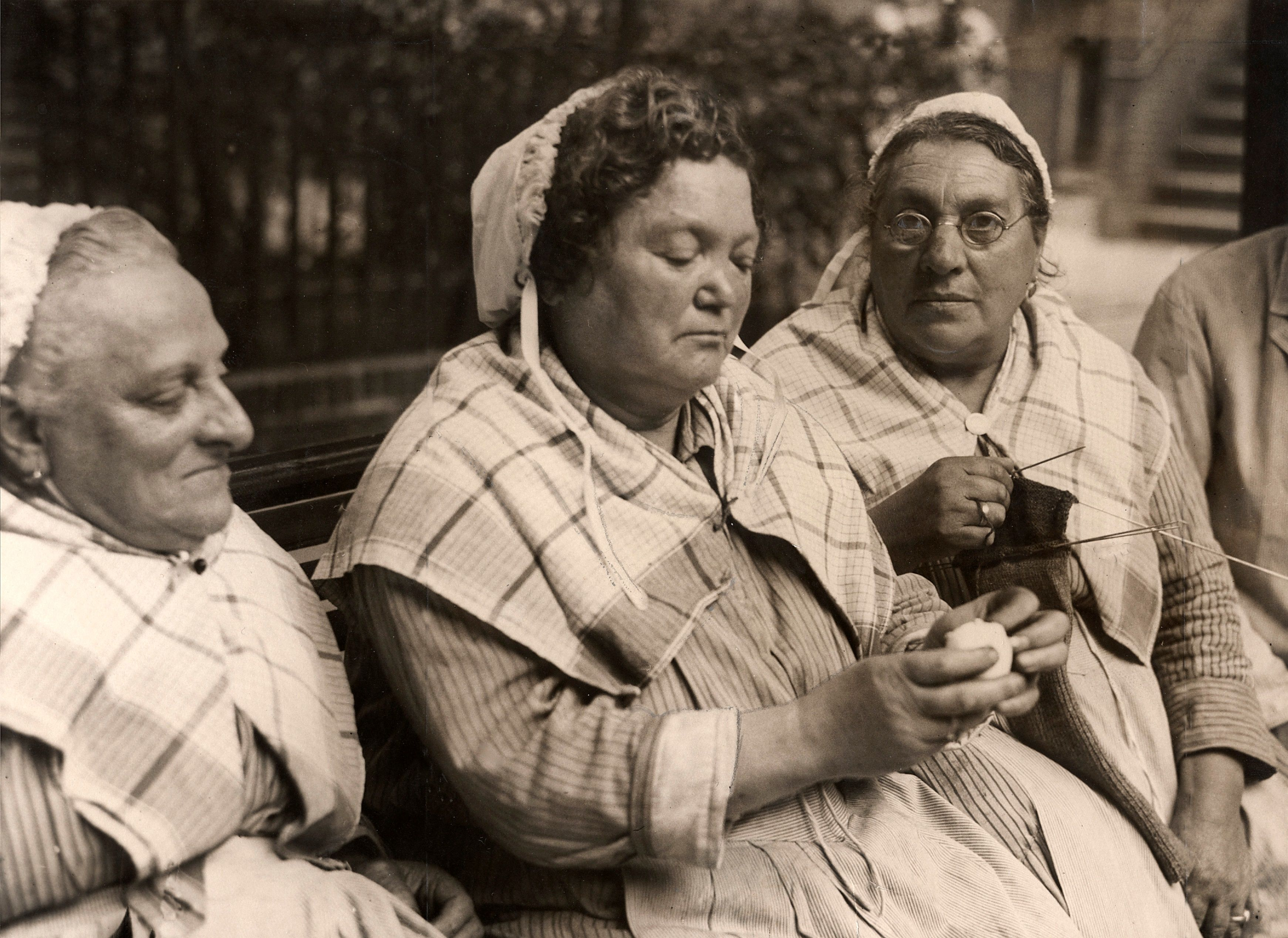
Three Jewish women in the home for the elderly in Amsterdam. The Netherlands, before 1940.

=== The Holocaust ===
The Holocaust in the Netherlands took place with "remarkable speed" following the Nazi German occupation of neutral Netherlands. In less than two years, some 75% of the Dutch-Jewish population was murdered in the Holocaust. The Nazis moved quickly to separate Dutch Jews and Jewish refugees from the Dutch population, in a series of small measures leading up to the transportation of Jews to extermination camps. Following the pattern the Nazis established in Germany, Jews were stripped of rights as citizens and could not pursue many professions. The chief justice of the Dutch Supreme Court was forced to resign, because he was a Jew. His fellow justices did nothing to protest his dismissal. Jews were forced to register as Jews, with their names and home addresses listed. The regime issued new identity cards to the population, with Jews' cards marked with a large J. The Nazi occupiers used the existing Dutch civil authorities to implement their edicts. Resistance could be met with violence by Dutch police. When there was general public outrage and a strike protesting measures restricting Jews in February 1941, Dutch police made arrests at the time. Immediately afterwards, the Nazi authorities warned the Dutch populace that Jews were not part of the Dutch populace and that those supporting them would "bear the consequences."

In 1939, there were some 140,000 Dutch Jews living in the Netherlands, among them some 24,000 to 25,000 German-Jewish refugees who had fled from Germany in the 1930s. (Other sources claim that some 34,000 Jewish refugees entered the Netherlands between 1933 and 1940, mostly from Germany and Austria). The German-Jewish refugees were the first to be targeted with the Nazis' regulations, since they were not Dutch citizens and more vulnerable than the Dutch Jews, and they were brought under the direct control of the police.

In 2017, a ketuba (Jewish marriage certificate) signed in 1931 was found hidden in a chimney in a private home in the village of Hattem. The Overijssel Historical Center began a search for relatives of the couple who were murdered in the Holocaust.

=== 1945–1960 ===
The Jewish-Dutch population after the Second World War is marked by certain significant changes: disappointment, emigration, a low birth rate, and a high intermarriage rate. After the Second World War and the Holocaust, returning Jews and Jews who had survived the often difficult hidden living ('diving') met with total lack of understanding of their fate and had to endure lasting loss of property. Especially mental health care was lacking and only started to develop from 1960 onwards in the Sinai centrum in Amersfoort. From 1973 professor Bastiaans tried to treat Holocaust victims with LSD in the Centrum '45 in Oegstgeest, attached to the Leiden University. This brought little success, if any. Understanding started to grow by a series of four TV documentaries on the Nazi occupation of the Netherlands made by the Jewish historian Lou de Jong, broadcast on Dutch national public TV (NTS, then the sole TV channel). The first four installments aired in 1960, were considered a turning point and left many Dutch, who until then had hardly had any notion of the gruesome depth of the Holocaust, aghast. The series continued through 1964. Dr De Jong subsequently published a 14-part, 29-volume history of the Netherlands during World War II. In 1965, Jaques Presser published his magister opus Ondergang (Demise – the Persecution and Eradication of Dutch Jewry). The work was reprinted six times during its first year, reaching the extraordinary print run of 150,000 – still today a record in the history of publishing in the Netherlands.

Thousands of surviving Jews emigrated, or made aliyah to Mandatory Palestine, later Israel. Aliyah from the Netherlands initially surpassed that of any other Western nation. Israel is still home to some 6,000 Dutch Jews. Others emigrated to the United States. There was a high assimilation and intermarriage rate among those who stayed. As a result, the Jewish birth rate and organized community membership dropped. In the aftermath of the Holocaust, and the sharp increase of understanding for the Shoah, relations with non-Jews were gradually more friendly. The Jewish community received reparations payments from the Dutch government. Also reparations from Germany, Wiedergutmachung, started to trickle down into Dutch Jewish households.

In 1947, two years after the end of the Second World War in the Netherlands, the total number of Jews as counted in the population census was just 14,346 (less than 10 percent of the count of 154,887 by the Nazi occupation force in 1941). Later, this number was adjusted by Jewish organizations to some 24,000 Jews living in the Netherlands in 1954. This was a huge loss compared to the number of Jews counted in 1941. This latter number was disputed, as the Nazi occupation force counted Jews on their classification of race. They included hundreds of Christians of Jewish heritage in the Nazi census. According to Raul Hilberg, in his book, Perpetrators Victims Bystanders: the Jewish Catastrophe, 1933–1945, "the Netherlands ... [had] 1,572 Protestants [of Jewish heritage in 1943] ... There were also some 700 Catholic Jews living in the Netherlands [during the Nazi occupation] ...".

In 1954, the Dutch Jews were recorded in the Netherlands as follows (province; number of Jews):

- Groningen – 242
- Friesland – 155
- Drenthe – 180
- Overijssel – 945
- Gelderland – 997
- Utrecht – 848
- North Holland – 15,446 (including 14,068 in Amsterdam)
- South Holland – 3,934
- Zeeland – 59
- North Brabant – 620
- Limburg – 297
- Total – 23,723

=== 1960s and 1970s ===
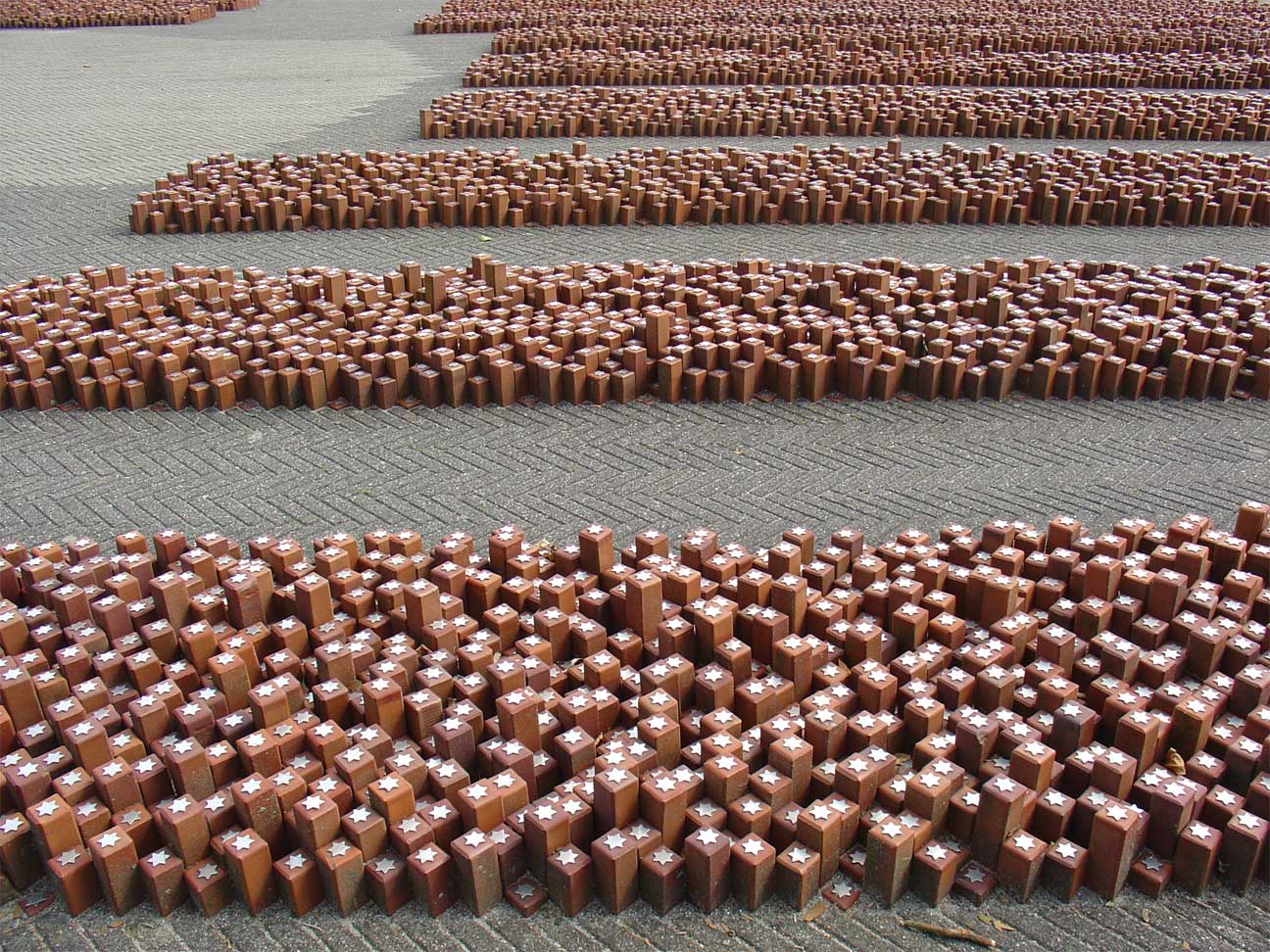
Monument at the Westerbork transit camp, with the names of those transported on Stars of David

Because of the loss of 79% of the population, including many children and young people, the birth rate among Jews declined in the 1960s and 1970s. Intermarriage increased; the intermarriage rate of Jewish males was 41% and of Jewish women 28% in the period of 1945–1949. By the 1990s, the percentage of intermarriage increased to some 52% of all Jewish marriages. Among males, or so-called "father Jews", the intermarriage rate is as high as 80%. Some within the Jewish community have tried to counter this trend, creating possibilities for single Jews to meet other single Jews. The dating sites Jingles and Jentl en Jewell are for that purpose. According to research by the Joods Maatschappelijk Werk (Jewish Social Service), numerous Dutch Jews earned an academic education. There are proportionally more Jewish Dutch women in the labor force than non-Jewish Dutch women.

In 1970, the Dutch monarch, Juliana inaugurated the Westerbork transit camp monument to Dutch Jews and other persecuted groups who passed through the camp as they were transported to Nazi death camps.

== 21st century ==
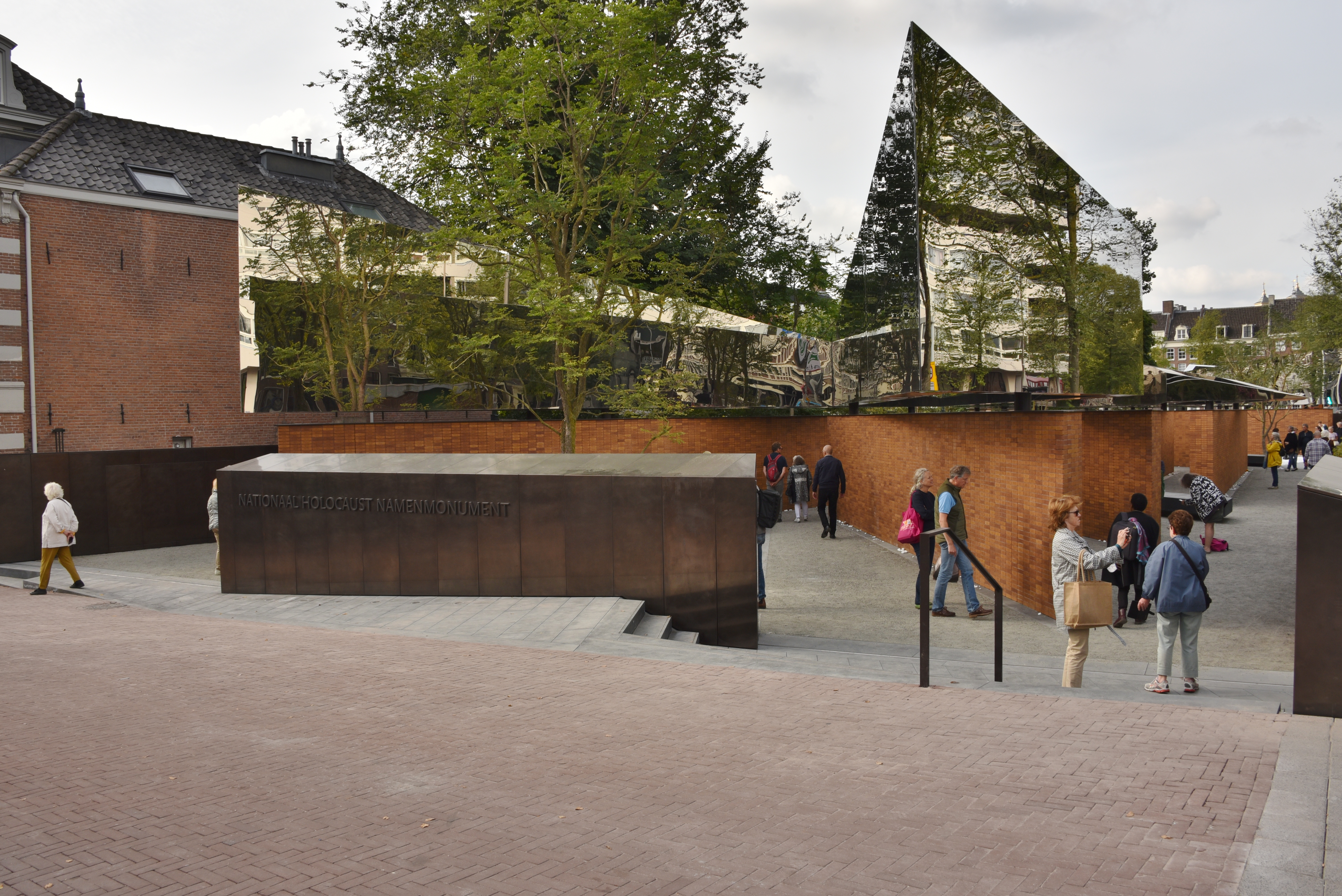
Holocaust Names Monument, Amsterdam, opened 2021

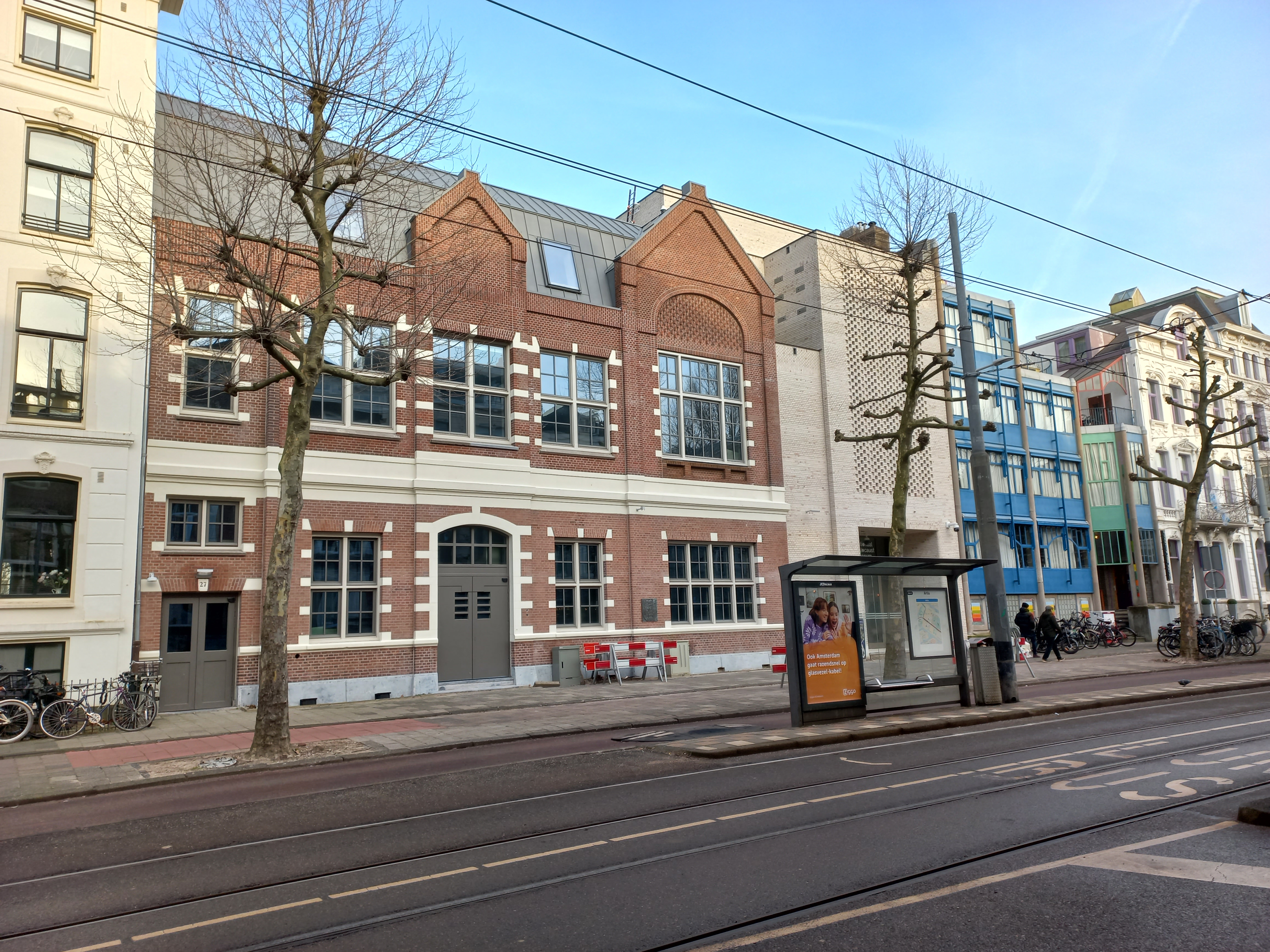
Dutch National Holocaust Museum, Amsterdam

=== 2000s ===
Since the late 20th century, a number of mostly Israeli and Russian Jews have immigrated to the Netherlands, the latter after the Soviet Union eased emigration and after its dissolution. Approximately one in three Dutch Jews was born elsewhere. The number of Israeli Jews living in the Netherlands (concentrated in Amsterdam) runs in the thousands (estimates run from 5,000 to 7,000 Israeli expatriates in the Netherlands, although some claims go as high as 12,000). A relatively small number of these Israeli Jews is connected to one of the religious Jewish institutions in the Netherlands. In the 21st century, some 10,000 Dutch Jews have emigrated to Israel.

As of 2006, approximately 41,000 to 45,000 people in the Netherlands either identify as Jewish, or are defined as Jewish by halakha (Rabbinic law), by which persons with Jewish mothers are defined as Jewish. About 70% of these (approximately 30,000) have a Jewish mother. Another 30% have a Jewish father (some 10,000–15,000 persons; their number was estimated at 12,470 in April 2006). Orthodox Jews do not accept them as Jews unless they undergo a religious conversion through an Orthodox Bet Din. Most Dutch Jews live in the major cities in the west of the Netherlands (Amsterdam, Rotterdam, The Hague, Utrecht); some 44% of all Dutch Jews live in Amsterdam, which is considered the centre of Jewish life in the country. In 2000, 20% of the Jewish-Dutch population was 65 years or older; birth rates among Jews were low. An exception is the growing Orthodox Jewish population, especially in Amsterdam.

There are some 150 synagogues present in the Netherlands; 50 are still used for religious services. Large Jewish communities in the Netherlands are found in Amsterdam, Rotterdam and The Hague.

=== 2010s ===
Various antisemitic incidents continue to occur,. In 2014 a monument was defaced that was dedicated to the Jews of Gorinchem, seventy of whom were murdered in World War II. Commentators associate such incidents with the ongoing tensions in the Middle East. Esther Voet, director of the Centrum Informatie en Documentatie Israël, advised the Knesset in 2014 that Dutch Jews were concerned about what they perceived as increasing antisemitism in the Netherlands. Antisemitic incidents occurred during 2015: graffiti appeared in Oosterhout, a Jewish man was harassed in Amersfoort, and a Jewish cemetery was vandalized in Oud-Beijerland.

In June 2015, De Telegraaf published results of a report on antisemitism among youths, conducted by the Verwey Jonker Institute. The survey revealed that antisemitism is more prevalent among Muslims: 12 percent of Muslim respondents expressed a "not positive" view of Dutch Jews, compared to two percent among Dutch Christian respondents. Some 40% of Muslim respondents expressed a "not positive" view for Jews in Israel, compared to 6% of the Dutch Christian respondents.

The ADL (Anti-Defamation League) published the "ADL Global 100" (2019), an international survey conducted in 2019 to measure antisemitic opinions in 18 countries around the world. According to the survey, 10% of the population in the Netherlands harbors antisemitic opinions. The survey was composed of eleven phrases that represent antisemitic stereotypes. For example, 43% of the population agreed with the phrase "Jews are more loyal to Israel than to this country", while 20% agreed with "Jews have too much power in the business world".

=== 2020s ===
In March 2024, the Dutch monarch spoke at the reopening of the Dutch National Holocaust Museum, where he spoke in his remarks about "the devastating consequences that antisemitism can have". There are also monuments and other memorials to Dutch Jewry.

On 13 March 2026, during the 2026 Iran war, an arson attack damaged a synagogue on A.B.N. Davidsplein in Rotterdam. An explosion near the entrance of the synagogue resulted in a fire without reported injuries. International outlets reported about the incident as part of several suspected antisemitic attacks following the outbreak of the war. The terrorist were arrested near the Liberal synagogue of Rotterdam, in the neighborhood of Hillegersberg. The next day, a Jewish school in Amsterdam was damaged by an explosion, an incident that Amsterdam mayor Femke Halsema called a "targeted attack against the Jewish community," lamenting that "Jewish people in Amsterdam are increasingly confronted with antisemitism."

== Religion in the current era ==
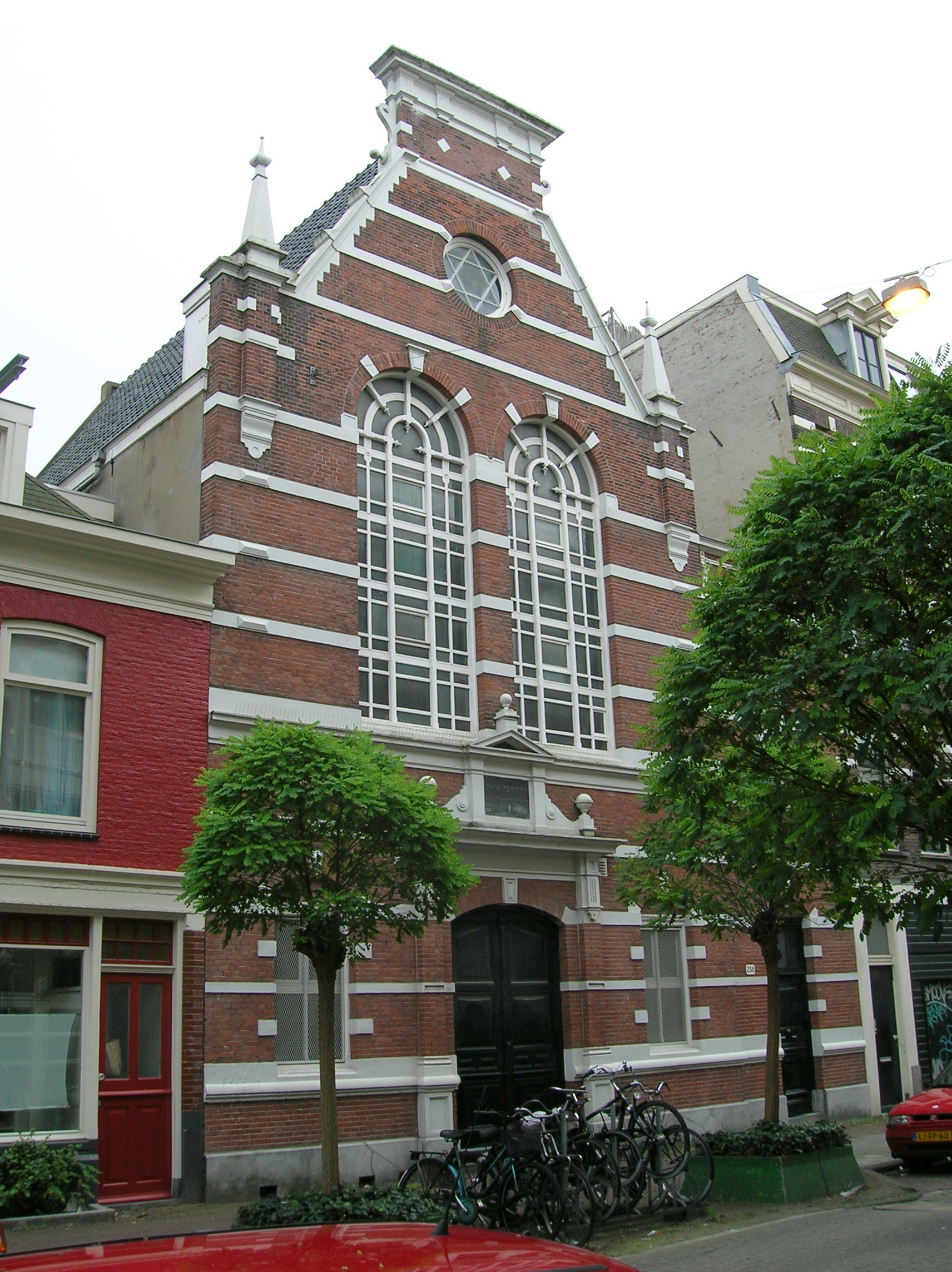
The Gerard Doustraat Synagogue in Amsterdam, Netherlands

Some 9,000 Dutch Jews, out of a total of 30,000 (some 30%), are connected to one of the seven major Jewish religious organizations. Smaller, independent synagogues exist as well.

=== Orthodox Judaism ===
Most affiliated Jews in the Netherlands (Jews part of a Jewish community) are affiliated to the Nederlands Israëlitisch Kerkgenootschap (Dutch Israelite Church) (NIK), which can be classified as part of (Ashkenazi) Orthodox Judaism. The NIK has approximately 5,000 members, spread over 36 congregations (of whom 13 are in Amsterdam and surroundings) in four jurisdictions (Amsterdam, The Hague, Rotterdam and the Interprovincial Rabbinate). It is larger than the Union of Liberal Synagogues (LJG) and thirteen times as large as the Portuguese Israelite Religious Community (PIK). The NIK was founded in 1814. At its height in 1877, it represented 176 Jewish communities. By World War II, it had 139 communities; it is made up of 36 congregations today. Besides governing some 36 congregations, the NIK has responsibility for the operation of more than 200 Jewish cemeteries in the Netherlands (the total is 250).

In 1965 Rabbi Meir Just was appointed Chief Rabbi of the Netherlands, a position he held until his death in April 2010.

The small Portugees-Israëlitisch Kerkgenootschap (Portuguese Israelite Religious Community) (PIK), which is Sephardic in practice, has a membership of some 270 families. It is concentrated in Amsterdam. It was founded in 1870, although Sephardic Jews had long been in the city. Throughout history, Sephardic Jews in the Netherlands, in contrast to their Ashkenazi co-religionists, have settled mostly in a few communities: Amsterdam, The Hague, Rotterdam, Naarden and Middelburg. Only the congregation in Amsterdam survived the Holocaust with enough members to maintain its activities.

Three Jewish schools are located in Amsterdam, all situated in the Buitenveldert neighbourhood (Rosh Pina, Maimonides and Cheider). Cheider is affiliated with Haredi Orthodox Judaism. Chabad has eleven rabbis, in Almere, Amersfoort, Amstelveen, Amsterdam, Haarlem, Maastricht, Rotterdam, The Hague and Utrecht. The head shluchim in the Netherlands are rabbis I. Vorst and Binyomin Jacobs. The latter is chief rabbi of the Interprovinciaal Opperrabbinaat (the Dutch Rabbinical Organisation) and vice-president of Cheider. Chabad serves approximately 2,500 Jews in the Holland region, and an unknown number in the rest of the Netherlands. There is also a Haredi Lithuanian style Kollel in Buitenveldert run by Rabbi Yaakov Ball. Members of this kollel have gone on to other positions in education and the Rabbinate, notably Rabbi Simcho Stanton, Rabbi of the growing Haredi community Kehal Chassidiem.

=== Reform Judaism ===
Though the number of Dutch Jews is decreasing, the last decades have seen a growth of Liberal Jewish communities throughout the country. Introduced by German-Jewish refugees in the early 1930s, nowadays some 3,500 Jews in the Netherlands are linked to one of several Liberal Jewish synagogues throughout the country. Liberal synagogues are present in Amsterdam (founded in 1931; 725 families – some 1,700 members), Rotterdam (1968), The Hague (1959; 324 families), Tilburg (1981), Utrecht (1993), Arnhem (1965; 70 families), Haaksbergen (1972), Almere (2003), Heerenveen (2000; some 30 members) and Zuid-Laren. The Verbond voor Liberaal-Religieuze Joden in Nederland (LJG) (Union for Liberal-Religious Jews in the Netherlands) (to which all the communities mentioned above are part of) is affiliated to the World Union for Progressive Judaism. On 29 October 2006, the LJG changed its name to Nederlands Verbond voor Progressief Jodendom (NVPJ) (Dutch Union for Progressive Judaism). The NVPJ has ten rabbis; some of them are: Menno ten Brink, David Lilienthal, Awraham Soetendorp, Edward van Voolen, Marianne van Praag, Navah-Tehillah Livingstone, Albert Ringer, Tamara Benima.

A new Liberal synagogue has been built (2010) in Amsterdam, 300 meters away from the current synagogue. This was needed since the former building became too small for the growing community. The Liberal synagogue in Amsterdam receives approximately 30 calls a month by people who wish to convert to Judaism. The number of people who complete conversion is much lower. The number of converts to Liberal Judaism may be as high as 200 to 400, in an existing community of approximately 3,500.

Amsterdam is home to Beit Ha'Chidush, a progressive religious community that was founded in 1995 by Jews with secular as well as religious backgrounds. They wanted to create a more open, diverse, and renewed Judaism. The community accepts members from all backgrounds, including homosexuals and half-Jews (including Jews with a Jewish father, the first Jewish community in the Netherlands to do so). Beit Ha'Chidush has links to Jewish Renewal in the United States, and Liberal Judaism in the United Kingdom. The rabbi for the community was German-born Elisa Klapheck, the first female rabbi of the Netherlands. It is now Tamarah Benima. The community uses the Uilenburger Synagoge in the center of Amsterdam.

=== Reconstructionist Judaism ===
The Open Jewish Congregation OJG Klal Israël in Delft was founded at the end of 2005, to establish an accepting home for all Jews. The first service was held on 6 January 2005 in the historic Koornmarkt synagogue of Delft. Services have continued every two weeks, alternating on Friday evening or Saturday morning, next to holidays. Klal Israël has been affiliated with the Jewish Reconstructionist Communities since November 2009. Participation in the activities is open to anyone who feels Jewish, is Jewish, or wants to be Jewish. Klal Israël is a progressive egalitarian community, where women and men enjoy equal rights. The siddurim – prayer books – contain Hebrew text as well as a phonetic transcription and a translation in Dutch. Klal Israël offers a giur procedure. As of the beginning of the Jewish year 5777 (2 October 2016), Hannah Nathans is rabbi of the kehilla (congregation, Hebr.).

=== Conservative Judaism ===
Conservative Judaism ("Masorti") was introduced in the Netherlands in 2000, with the founding of a community in the city of Almere. In 2005 Masorti Nederland (Masorti Netherlands) had some 75 families, primarily based in the greater Amsterdam-Almere region. The congregation uses the 19th century synagogue in the city of Weesp. Its first rabbi is David Soetendorp (1945).

There is also a second Dutch Masorti kehilla in the city of Deventer called Masorti Jewish Community Beth Shoshanna that began in 2010 and holds services and other activities in the 19th century Great Synagogue of Deventer.

=== Jewish Renewal ===
Jewish Renewal was first introduced in the Netherlands in the 1990s by Carola de Vries Robles. HaMakor – Center for Jewish Spirituality is the current home for Jewish Renewal and is led by Rabbi Hannah Nathans. They do not have membership dues and therefore most activities require money paid to participate.

== Education and youth in the current era ==
=== Jewish schools ===
There are three Jewish schools in the Netherlands, all in Amsterdam and affiliated with the Nederlands Israëlitisch Kerkgenootschap (NIK). Rosj Pina is a school for Jewish children ages 4 through 12. Education is mixed (boys and girls together) despite its affiliation to the Orthodox NIK. It is the largest Jewish school in the Netherlands. As of 2007, it had 285 pupils enrolled. Maimonides is the largest Jewish high school in the Netherlands. It had some 160 pupils enrolled in 2005. Although founded as a Jewish school and affiliated to the NIK, it has a secular curriculum. Cheider, started by former resistance fighter Arthur Juda Cohen, presents education to Jewish children of all ages. Of the three, it is the only school with a Haredi background. Girls and boys are educated in separate classes. The school has some 200 pupils.

==== The Hague ====
Tzemach Hasadeh is a Jewish kindergarten in The Hague. It has been active since 1997 and has a Jewish, Dutch and Israeli education program.

=== Jewish youth ===
Several Jewish organisations in the Netherlands are focused on Jewish youth. They include:

- Bne Akiwa Holland (Bnei Akiva), a religious Zionist youth organisation.
- CIJO, the youth organisation of CIDI (Centrum Informatie en Documentatie Israël), a political Jewish youth organisation.
- Gan Israel Holland, the Dutch branch of the youth organisation of Chabad.
- Haboniem-Dror, a socialist Zionist youth movement.
- Ijar, a Jewish student organisation
- Moos, an independent Jewish youth organisation
- Netzer Holland, a Zionist youth organisation aligned to the NVPJ
- NextStep, the youth organisation of Een Ander Joods Geluid

== Jewish health care in the current era ==
There are two Jewish nursing homes in the Netherlands. One, Beth Shalom, is situated in Amsterdam at two locations, Amsterdam Buitenveldert and Amsterdam Osdorp. There are some 350 elderly Jews currently residing in Beth Shalom. Another Jewish nursing home, the Mr. L.E. Visserhuis, is located in The Hague. It is home to some 50 elderly Jews. Both nursing homes are aligned to Orthodox Judaism; kosher food is available. Both nursing homes have their own synagogue.

There is a Jewish wing at the Amstelland Hospital in Amstelveen. It is unique in Western Europe in that Jewish patients are cared for according to Orthodox Jewish law; kosher food is the only type of food available at the hospital. The Jewish wing was founded after the fusion of the Nicolaas Tulp Hospital and the (Jewish) Central Israelite Patient Care in 1978.

The Sinai Centrum (Sinai Center) is a Jewish psychiatric hospital located in Amsterdam, Amersfoort (primary location) and Amstelveen, which focuses on mental healthcare, as well as caring for and guiding persons who are mentally disabled. It is the only Jewish psychiatric hospital currently operating in Europe. Originally focusing on the Jewish segment of the Dutch population, and especially on Holocaust survivors who were faced with mental problems after the Second World War, nowadays the Sinai Centrum also provides care for non-Jewish victims of war and genocide.

== Jewish media ==
Jewish television and radio in the Netherlands is produced by NIKMedia. Part of NIKMedia is the Joodse Omroep, which broadcasts documentaries, stories and interviews on a variety of Jewish topics every Sunday and Monday on the Nederland 2 television channel (except from the end of May until the beginning of September). NIKMedia is also responsible for broadcasting music and interviews on Radio 5.

The Nieuw Israëlitisch Weekblad is the oldest still functioning (Jewish) weekly in the Netherlands, with some 6,000 subscribers. It is an important news source for many Dutch Jews, focusing on Jewish topics on a national as well as on an international level. The Joods Journaal (Jewish Weekly) was founded in 1997 and is seen as a more "glossy" magazine in comparison to the NIW. It gives a lot of attention to the Israeli–Palestinian conflict. Another Jewish magazine published in the Netherlands is the Hakehillot Magazine, issued by the NIK, the Jewish Community of Amsterdam and the PIK. Serving a more liberal Jewish audience, the NVPJ publishes its own magazine, Levend Joods Geloof (Living Jewish Faith), six times a year; serving this same audience, Beit Ha'Chidush publishes its own magazine as well, called Chidushim.

There are a couple of Jewish websites focusing on bringing Jewish news to the Dutch Jewish community. By far the most prominent is Joods.nl, which gives attention to the large Jewish communities in the Netherlands as well as to the Mediene, to Israel as well as to Jewish culture and youth.

== Amsterdam ==
Amsterdam's Jewish community today numbers about 15,000 people. A large number live in the neighbourhoods of Buitenveldert, the Oud-Zuid and the River Neighbourhood. Buitenveldert is considered a popular neighbourhood to live in; this is due to its low crime-rate and because it is considered to be a quiet neighbourhood.

Especially in the neighbourhood of Buitenveldert there's a sizeable Jewish community. In this area, Kosher food is widely available. There are several Kosher restaurants, two bakeries, Jewish-Israeli shops, a pizzeria and some supermarkets host a Kosher department. This neighourbood also has a Jewish elderly home, an Orthodox synagogue and three Jewish schools.

== Cultural distinctions ==
Uniquely in the Netherlands, Ashkenazi and Sephardi communities coexisted in close proximity. Having different cultural traditions, the communities remained generally separate, but their geographical closeness resulted in cross-cultural influences not found elsewhere. Notably, in the early days when small groups of Jews were attempting to establish communities, they used the services of rabbis and other officials from either culture, depending on who was available.

The close proximity of the two cultures also led to intermarriage at a higher rate than was known elsewhere, and in consequence many Jews of Dutch descent have family names that seem to belie their religious affiliation. All Dutch Jews have for centuries named children after the children's grandparents, which is otherwise considered exclusively a Sephardi tradition. (Ashkenazim elsewhere traditionally avoid naming a child after a living relative.)

In 1812, while the Netherlands was under Napoleonic rule, all Dutch residents (including Jews) were obliged to register surnames with the civic authorities; previously only Sephardim had complied with this. Although the Ashkenazim had avoided civic registration, many had been using an unofficial system of surnames for hundreds of years.

Also under Napoleonic rule, an 1809 law required Dutch Jewish schools to teach in Dutch as well as Hebrew. This excluded other languages. Yiddish, the lingua franca of Ashkenazim, and Judaeo-Portuguese, the previous language of the Portuguese Sephardim, practically ceased to be spoken among Dutch Jews. Certain Yiddish words have been adopted into the Dutch language, especially in Amsterdam, where there was a large Jewish population. (The city is also called Mokum, from the Hebrew word for town or place, makom.)

Several other Hebrew words can be found in the local dialect, including: Mazzel from mazel, which is the Hebrew word for luck or fortune; Tof which is Tov, in Hebrew meaning good (as in מזל טוב – Mazel tov); and Goochem, in Hebrew Chacham or Hakham, meaning wise, sly, witty or intelligent, where the Dutch g is pronounced similarly to the 8th letter of the Hebrew Alphabet the guttural Chet or Heth.

The Dutch Ashkenazi Hebrew pronunciation has some specific features that distinguish it from other pronunciations. Most prominently, the letter "ע" (ayin) is pronounced as "ng" ("ngayin"). Additionally, certain vowels are different from the mainstream Ashkenazi pronunciation.

== Economic influences ==
Jews played a major role in the development of Dutch colonial territories and international trade, and many Jews in former colonies have Dutch ancestry. However, all the major colonial powers were competing fiercely for control of trade routes; the Dutch were relatively unsuccessful and during the 18th century, their economy went into decline.

Many of the Ashkenazim in the rural areas were no longer able to subsist and they migrated to the cities in search of work. This caused a large number of small Jewish communities to collapse completely (Jewish law requires ten adult males to conduct major religious ceremonies, although non-Orthodox Jews have counted adult women as well from the 19th century). Entire communities migrated to the cities, where Jewish populations swelled dramatically. In 1700, the Jewish population of Amsterdam was 6,200, with Ashkenazim and Sephardim in almost equal numbers. By 1795 the figure was 20,335, the vast majority being poor Ashkenazim from rural areas. By the mid-nineteenth century, many were emigrating to other countries where the advancement of emancipation offered better opportunities (see Chuts).

== See also ==
- Dutch people in Israel
- Israel–Netherlands relations
- Beit Ha'Chidush
- History of the Jews in Amsterdam
- History of the Jews in Eindhoven
- History of the Jews in Maastricht
- History of the Jews in Tilburg
- List of Dutch Jews
- List of Jews deported from Wageningen (1942-1943)
- Mediene
- Nederlands Israëlitisch Kerkgenootschap
- Nederlands Israëlitische Gemeente Den Haag
- Nederlands Verbond voor Progressief Jodendom
- Nieuw Israëlietisch Weekblad
- Pallache family
- Portugees-Israëlitisch Kerkgenootschap
- Sephardic Jews in the Netherlands
