= B. de Almeyda =

B. de Almeyda was a Dutch Jewish engraver who worked in Amsterdam in the 17th century.
