= Great Synagogue of Deventer =

Former synagogue in Deventer, Netherlands

- Dutch: Grote Synagoge van Deventer
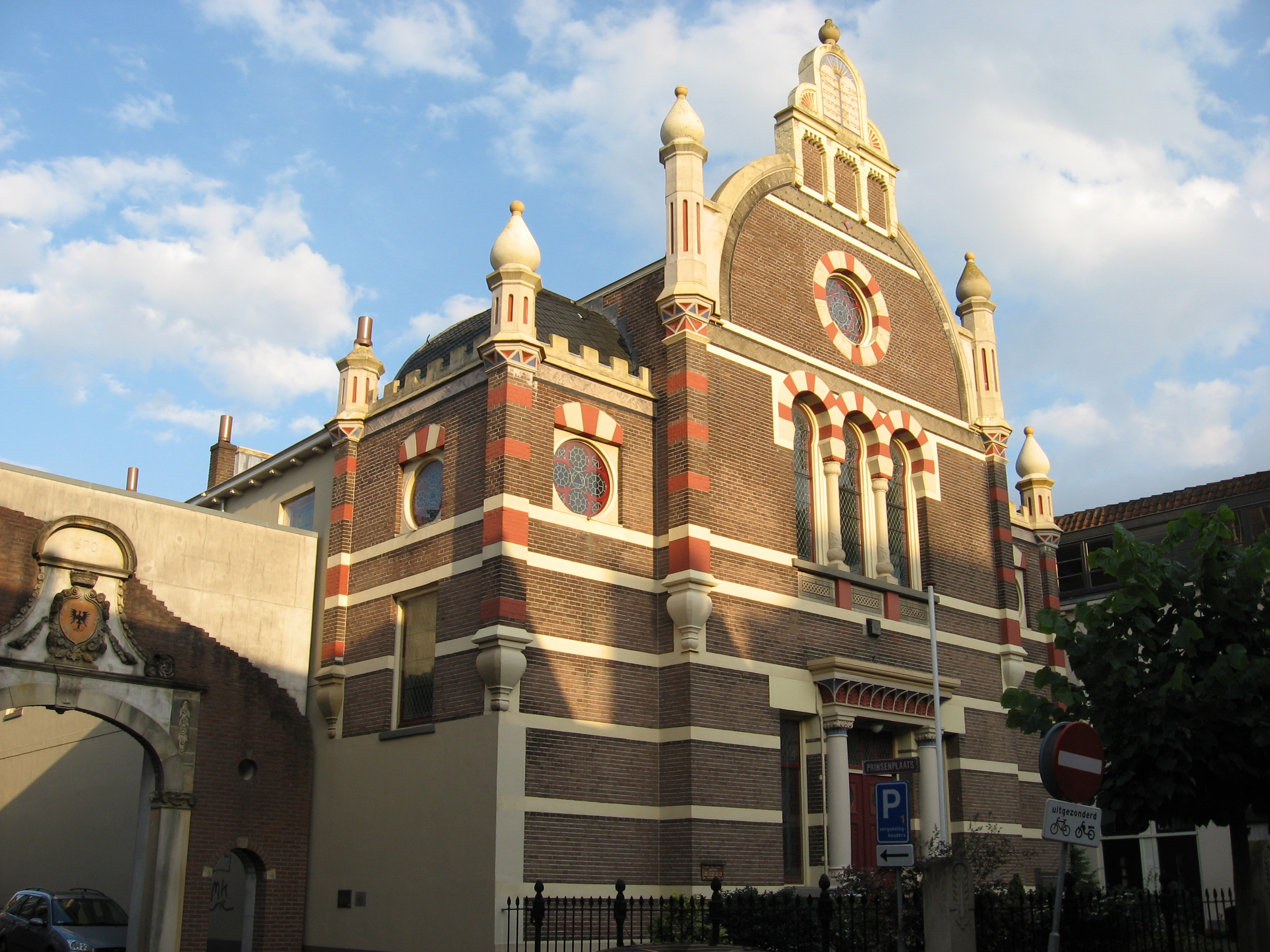
- The former synagogue in 2007

- Location of the former synagogue in Overijssel

Religion
- Affiliation: Judaism (former); Christianity (former)
- Rite: Nusach Ashkenaz
- Ecclesiastical or organizational status: Synagogue (1892–1941); Church (1951–2010); Synagogue (2010–2018); Profane use (since 2018)
- Status: Inactive (as a synagogue); Repurposed

Location
- Location: Golstraat 23, Deventer, Overijssel
- Country: The Netherlands
- Interactive map of Great Synagogue of Deventer
- Coordinates: 52°15′10″N 6°09′42″E

Architecture
- Architect: Jan Anthony Mulock Houwer
- Type: Synagogue architecture
- Style: Renaissance Revival; Moorish Revival
- Groundbreaking: 1891
- Completed: 1892
- Materials: Brick

The Great Synagogue of Deventer (Dutch: Grote Synagoge van Deventer) is a former Jewish congregation and synagogue, located at Golstraat 23, in the city of Deventer, in the Overijssel region of The Netherlands. Designed by J. A. Mulock Houwer in a mix of the Renaissance Revival and Moorish Revival styles, the synagogue was completed in 1892.

== History ==
This temple was built in 1892 by J. A. Mulock Houwer. It is a Renaissance Revival building with Moorish Revival influences. The structure includes minaret-like turrets, with crescents on either side. On the summit, just above the stone tablets with the Ten Commandments directly, was a large copper Star of David. The oriental style is a reference to the Taifa of Toledo, where, before 1492, peaceful and prosperous coexistence of Judaism with Islam and Christianity prevailed. The combination of crescents and a Star of David explicitly refers to the peaceful co-existence with Islam in Toledo.

During World War II, the interior was destroyed by Dutch Nazis (members of the Dutch Nazi-party NSB).

Between 1951 and 2010 it was used as a place of worship by the Christian Reformed Church in the Netherlands.

From 2010 to 2018 the building was used as a synagogue by the Jewish community Beth Shoshanna.

In February 2018 the Christian Reformed Church in the Netherlands sold the building, while rented out Congregation Beth Shoshanna, to Lenferink Groep Zwolle, the real estate firm of investors Carlus Lenferink and Geert-Harm van der Maat. A restaurant entrepreneur working with the firm, Ayhan Sahin, circulated plans to change the synagogue into a food hall. These food hall plans were met with strong objections.

== Gallery ==
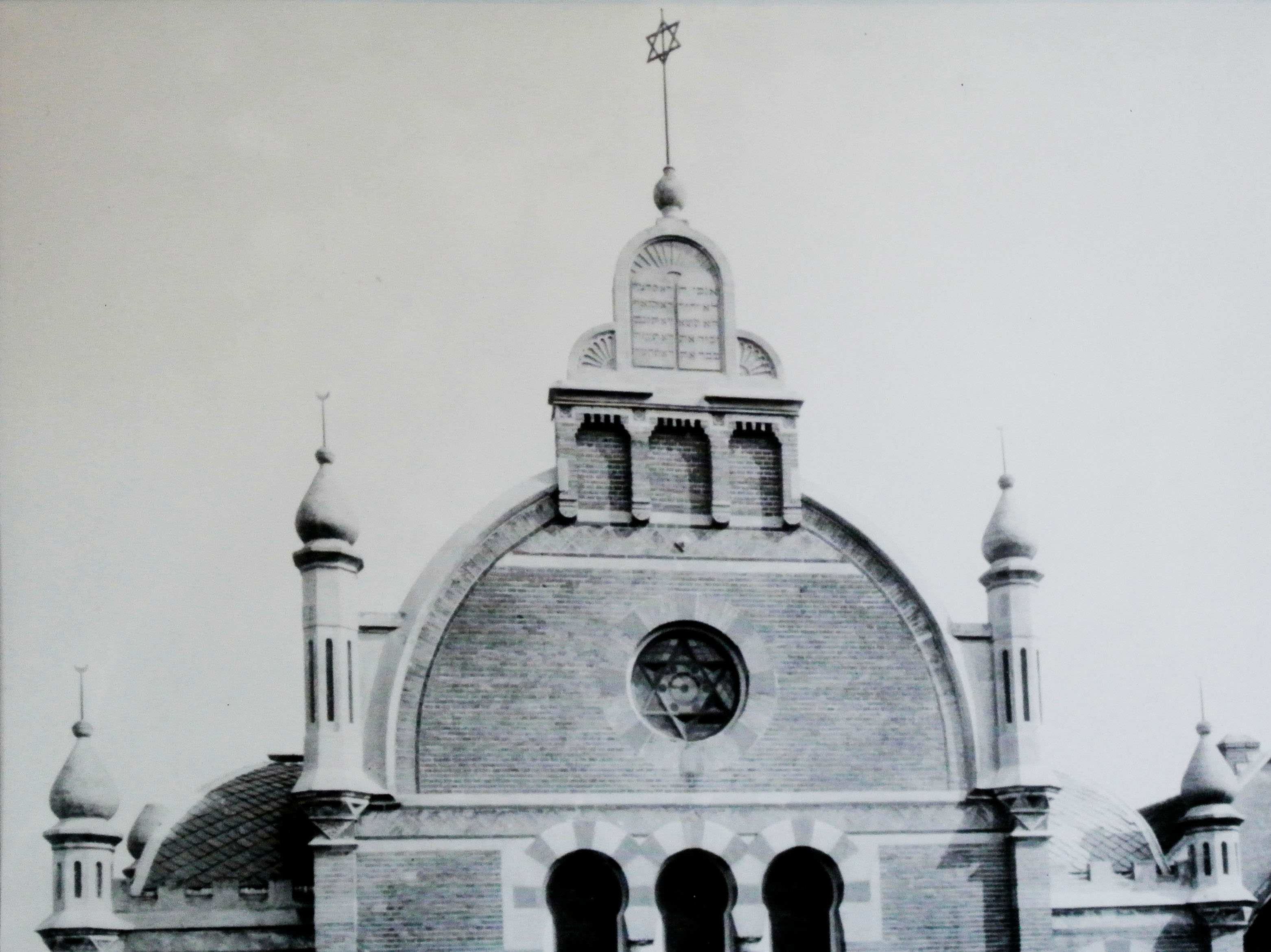
Original façade of the synagogue

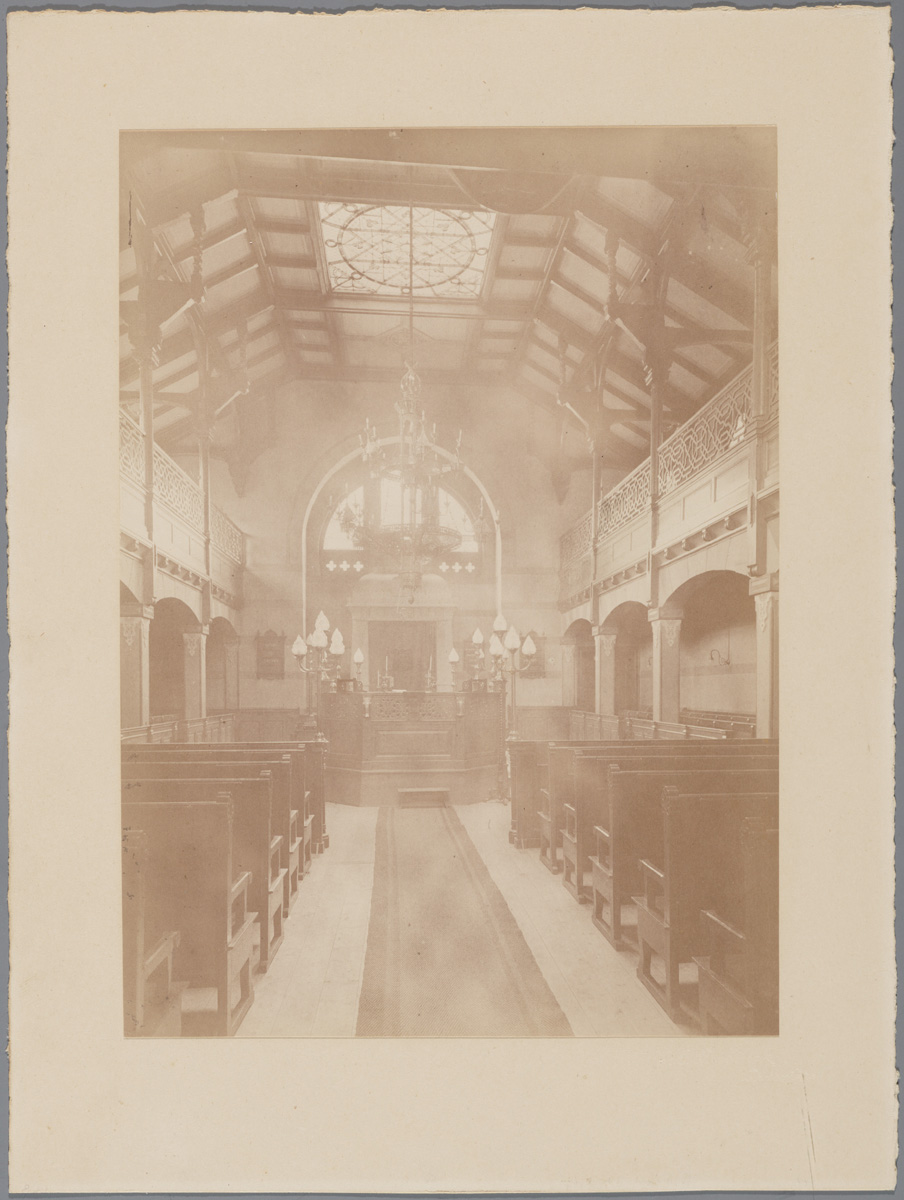
Original interior of the synagogue

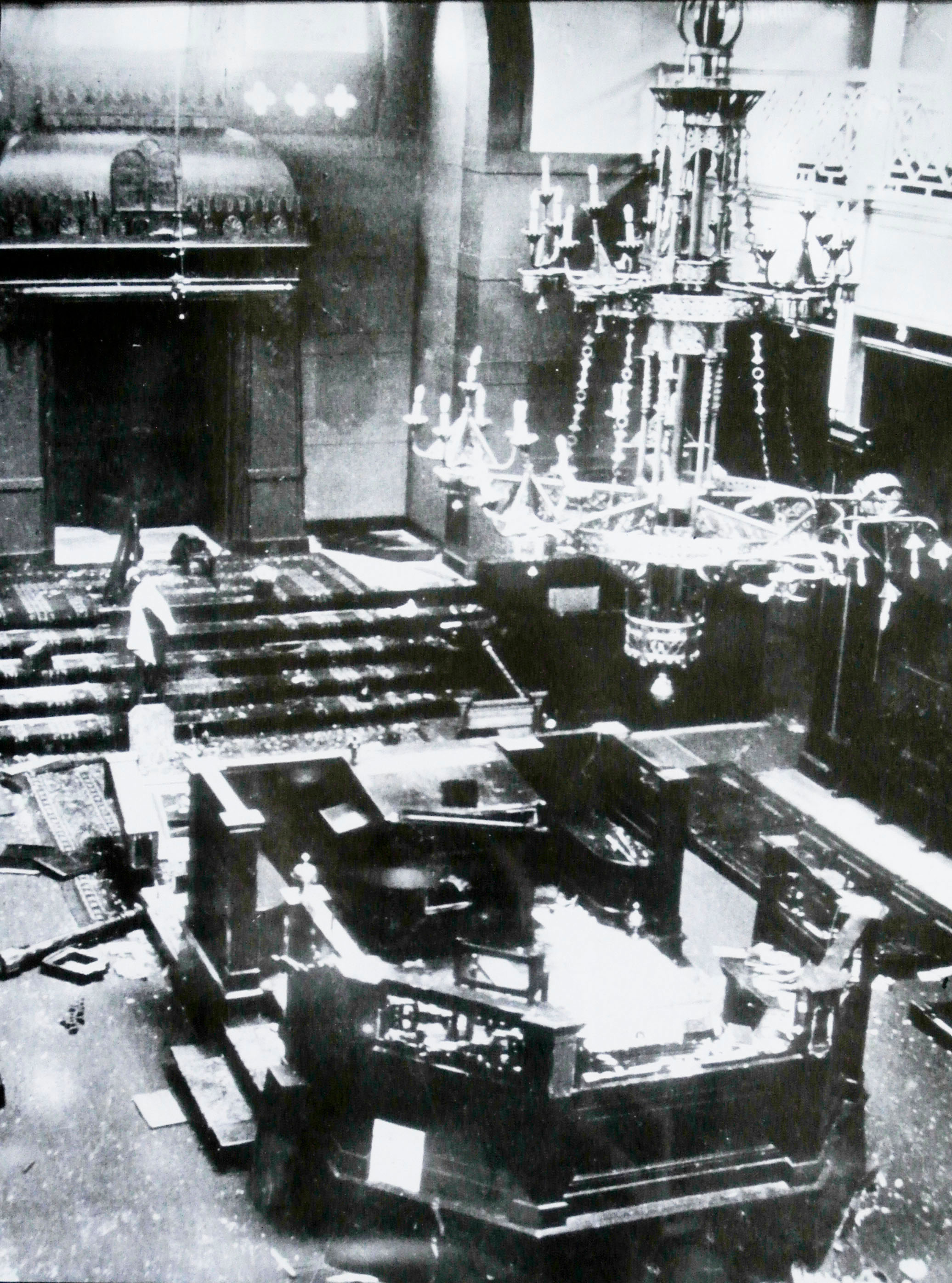
The synagogue interior following devastation during WWII by the Dutch NSB

== See also ==
- History of the Jews in the Netherlands
- List of synagogues in the Netherlands
