= Portugees-Israëlitisch Kerkgenootschap =

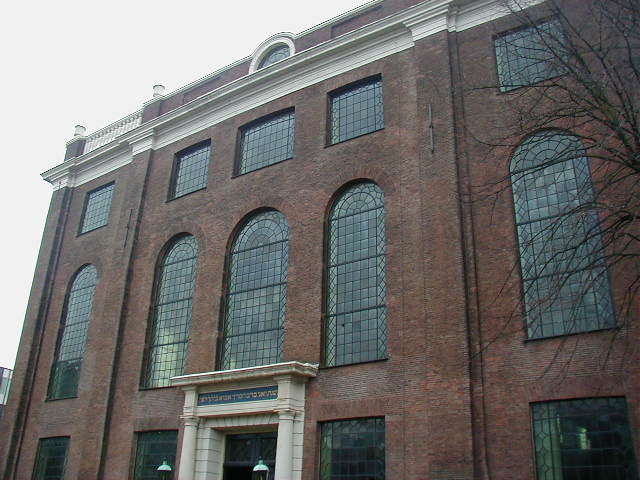
The Amsterdam Esnoga has been the Sephardic synagogue since 1675

The Portugees-Israëlitisch Kerkgenootschap (PIK) (Portuguese Israelite Religious Community) is the community for Sephardic Jews in the Netherlands. Sephardic Jews have been living in the Netherlands since the 16th century with the forced relocation of Spanish but above all Portuguese Jews Jews from their home countries due to the Inquisition. Some 270 families are connected to the PIK, also sometimes called PIG, (Portugees-Israëlitische Gemeente meaning "Portuguese Israelite Congregation").

It holds services in the monumental Esnoga synagogue or Snoge in downtown Amsterdam near Waterlooplein. There is also a small PIG-Sephardic synagogue in Amstelveen with weekly activities. Almost all community members live in Amsterdam and surroundings.

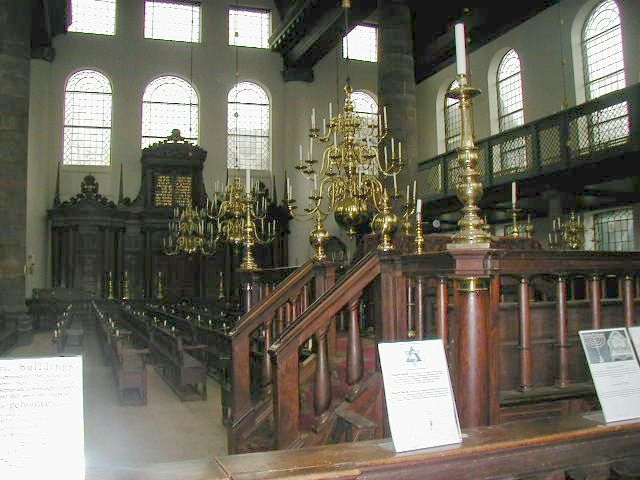
Interior of the Amsterdam Esnoga

== History ==
The PIK was founded in 1814 under the reign of Willem I, although the first steps towards a central organization of Jewish communities in the Netherlands were already taken in 1808, under command of the Napoleonic king, Louis Bonaparte. Both the Ashkenazi as well as the Sephardic communities were included. This lasted until 1871, when the PIK (founded in 1870 by dissatisfied Sephardic Jews after arguments about where the central organization which represented all Jews in the Netherlands was to be settled and after the wish to remove itself from their Ashkenazi co-religionists) removed itself from the Ashkenazi community and became a fully independent segment within Dutch Judaism.

Center of Sephardic life in the Netherlands was Amsterdam, although throughout time, communities also existed in places like The Hague, Rotterdam (twice, in the 17th and in the 19th century), Middelburg and Naarden. At the eve of The Holocaust, some 4,300 Sephardic Jews were living in the Netherlands, the majority of them in Amsterdam. Most of them were killed; at the end of the war, an estimated 800 were still alive.

== Cemeteries ==
Several Sephardic Jewish cemeteries have been founded since the first Jews settled in the Netherlands in the 16th century. Some of them have grown to be huge monuments of a once lively community. On the most well-known is Beth Haim in Ouderkerk aan de Amstel. Jews have been buried there since the year 1614 (making it the oldest Jewish cemetery in the Netherlands); until 1642, several Ashkenazi Jews were also buried at the cemetery, before buying their own piece of land to bury their dead near the village of Muiderberg. Throughout history, some 28,000 Sephardic Jews were buried at Beth Haim, making it one of the largest Jewish cemeteries in the Netherlands. Among the ones buried at this monumental site are rabbi Menasseh ben Israel, diplomat Samuel Pallache and the parents of philosopher Baruch Spinoza.

Other Sephardic cemeteries are found in Middelburg, Amersfoort, Rotterdam and The Hague.
