= History of the Jews in Tilburg =

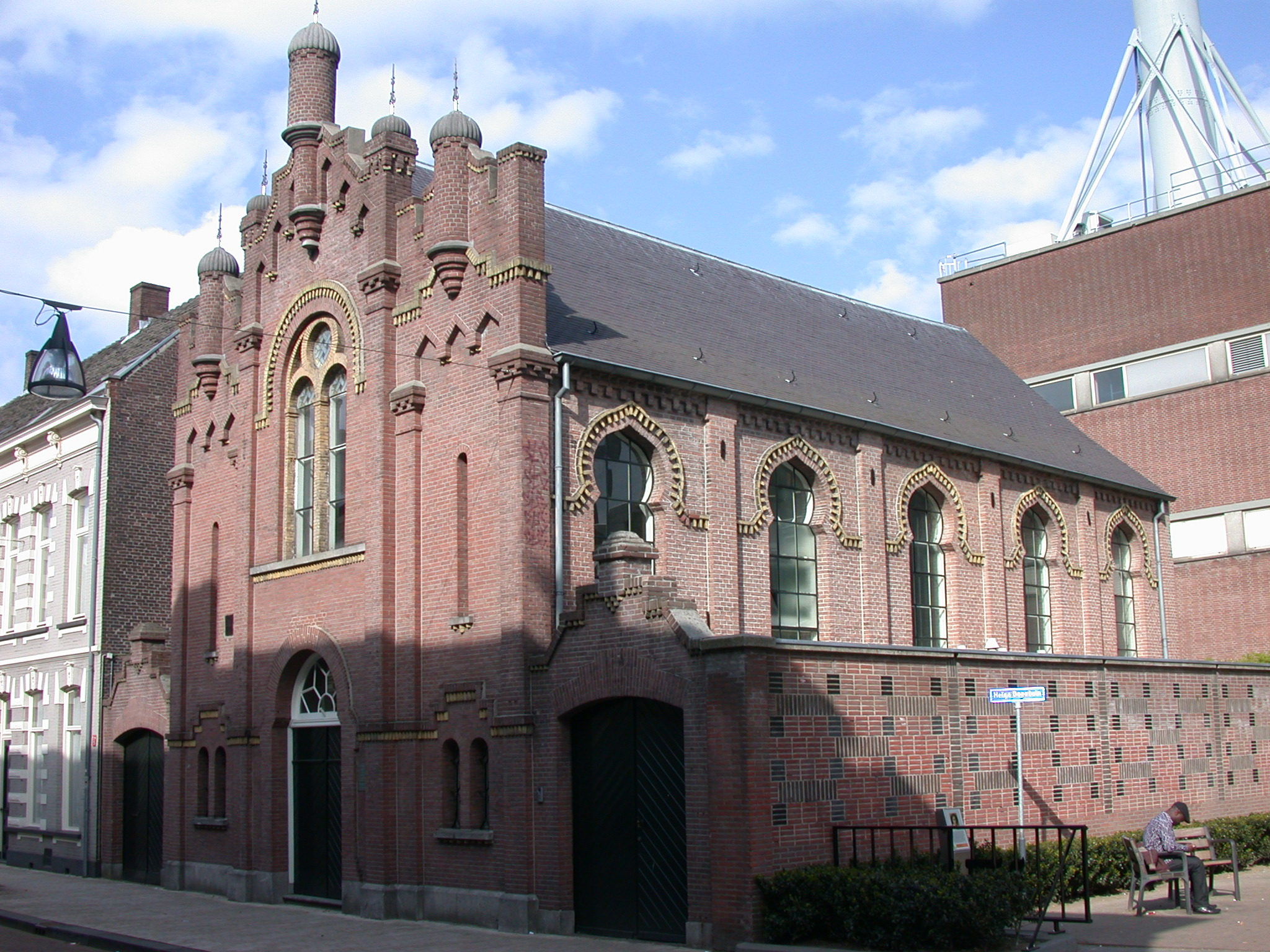
Tilburg: synagogue

The history of the Jews in Tilburg, Netherlands, did not start until 1767, when a Jewish citizen of the town Oisterwijk was given permission to settle in Tilburg, despite objections from the city council. Several Jewish families also succeeded in settling in Tilburg soon afterwards in 1791.

Because of a growing industry more and more Jews started to settle in Tilburg. Most came from Oisterwijk, where the textile industry was going through a period of decline. In 1820, a synagogue was built. However, due to extensive growth of the community, a larger synagogue was eventually built in 1873–1874. In 1855, a cemetery was inaugurated for the Jewish community.

Many of the Tilburg Jews were active in the textile industry and trade. In contrast to other Jewish communities in the so-called "mediene" (the Jewish communities outside the major cities in the western part of the country, such as Amsterdam, Rotterdam and The Hague), the community did not decrease in numbers due to the favorable economic position of Tilburg.

The 1930s saw a growth of the Jewish community because of a small influx of German-Jewish refugees. After the Netherlands had been overrun by the Nazis, a separate Jewish school was established in 1941. A Jewish Council was established in the summer of 1942. Between August 1942 and April 1943, the majority of Tilburg Jews were deported and subsequently killed. A number of Jews managed to hide. The interior of the synagogue was completely destroyed. An estimated 130 Tilburg Jews were killed in the Holocaust.

After the war the community was re-established. The synagogue was reinaugurated in 1949. It was given to the local government in 1976, after which it was given a social and cultural function. It was re-established as a synagogue for the Liberal Jewish community in 1998.

In 1981, the Liberal Jewish Community of Brabant "Aree Hanegev" was founded, serving Liberal Jews in the Dutch provinces of North Brabant, Limburg, Zeeland and parts of South Holland, as well as Jews from the Belgian provinces of Antwerp and Flemish Brabant.

Number of Jews in Tilburg:

- 1809: 26
- 1840: 126
- 1869: 112
- 1899: 142
- 1930: 171
- 1938: 259 (including 57 German Jews and 21 Eastern-European Jews)
- 1951: 120
- 1971: 45
- 1998: 13
