= Jerusalem of the West =

Nicknames for various cities

"Jerusalem of the West" was a term historically used by Jews to describe a non-Jewish diaspora city with a sizeable Jewish community that enjoyed freedom of religion and social prominence. The Jewish community in Amsterdam was often described this way.

== Usage ==
=== Amsterdam ===
"Is Amsterdam, then, a Jewish town?"
"Nay, but ‘tis the Jerusalem of the West."

— Dreamers of the Ghetto, Israel Zangwill, 1898

In Europe, Amsterdam was commonly associated with the term and was called Jeruzalem van het Westen in Dutch. Portuguese and Spanish Jews from Iberia first settled there in the late 16th and early 17th century and in 1672, there were an estimated 7,500 Jews living in the city. Protestant Holland had a reputation of tolerance which was rare in Europe at the time. It was "the first city in Europe where Jews were free from persecution and where they enjoyed religious liberty, ample economic opportunities and social equality." The epithet signalled that the Jews felt comfortable in the city. Prior to the Holocaust, there were about 80,000 Jews living in Amsterdam. "In modern Jewish historiography, the phrase 'Dutch Jerusalem' symbolizes Jewish steadfastness in the face of persecution and Jewish dynamism in the fertile environment of a liberal bourgeois society."

=== Tlemcen ===
In Northern Africa, Tlemcen in Algeria was called "Jerusalem of the West". In the 15th-century, the town was considered a major Jewish spiritual centre. André Chouraqui believed that there was a genuine geographical correspondence between the town and Jerusalem. He wrote: "We were living our dream in the midst of the beautiful countryside of the Maghreb. Tlemcen...resembles the city of David in altitude, climate, fauna and flora, to such an extent that we called in the Jerusalem of the Maghreb."

=== Other ===
Prior to World War II—Vilnius, Lithuania was known as the Jerusalem of the North. Other towns given the appellation include Toledo and Antwerp. Many other towns in northern Africa were also called symbolically after Jerusalem: Ghardaia, M'zab (Second Jerusalem), Djerba, Tunisia (Ante-chamber of Jerusalem, Jerusalem of Africa), Ifrane, Morocco (Little Jerusalem).

According to YIVO's archivist Leyzer Ran:

The inextinguishable yearning for Jerusalem, capital of Jewish national autonomy and creativity, accompanied Jews through all their wanderings and migrations. Wherever Jews were able to establish Jewish settlements and communities, the yearning for Jerusalem emerged, a nostalgia for the Jerusalem of the past and a desire to build a Jerusalem of the future. This 'reconstructive' process began with Sura and Pumbeditha in Babylonia and was followed by other communities: 'SHUM' (Hebrew initials for Speyer, Worms and Mainz) in Germany; Troyes and Carpentras in France; Cordova in Spain; Kiev (for the Kazars) in the Ukraine; Tatuan in Morocco; Salonica in Greece; Amsterdam (for the Marranos) in Holland; Prague in Bohemia; Lublin in Poland; Kovna in Zamot; Berditchev in Volhynia; to the Last Jerusalem of Lithuania - Vilna. Vilna was the Jerusalem of East European Jewry for three hundred years, until the Nazi Holocaust.

== See also ==
- Nowa Jerozolima (Warsaw), a small village established in 1774 for Jewish settlers in Mazovia, Poland.
- Mokum, Yiddish word meaning "safe haven", given to a number of towns in Holland and Germany.
- Wenzhou, called "Jerusalem of the East" due to its Christian population.
