= History of the Jews in Maastricht =

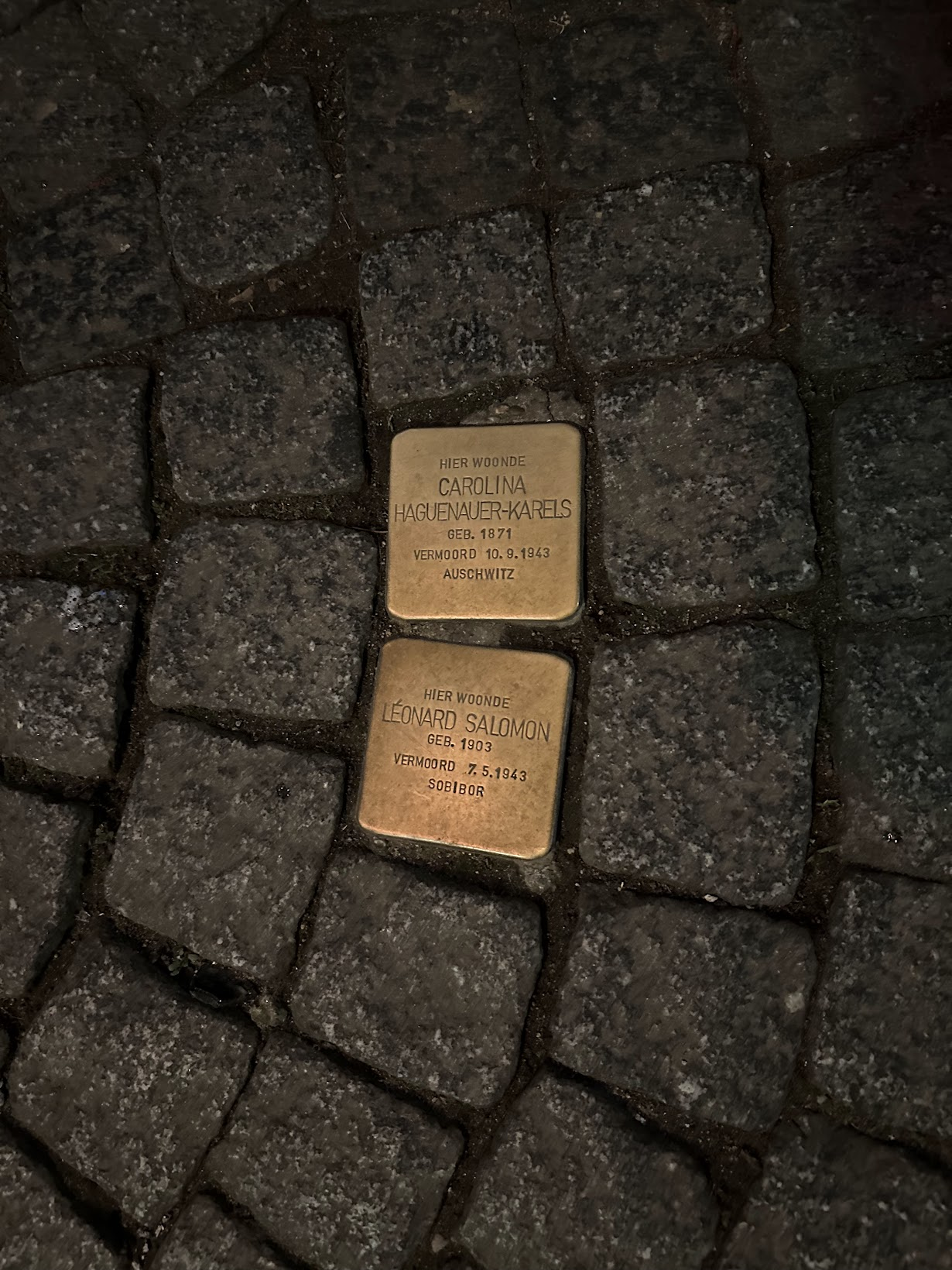
Stolpersteine commemorating Carolina Haguenauer-Karels and Léonard Salomon, at Stenenbrug 5 Maastricht

The history of the Jews in Maastricht, Netherlands, traces back to the Middle Ages. A synagogue with a mikvah existed in the city before 1295. However, severe pogroms persuaded Jews to leave Limburg en masse. Hardly any Jews lived in Limburg between the years 1350 and 1650.

Jews were not free again to settle in the city of Maastricht until 1796, two years after French forces had occupied the city. Only Jews with considerable wealth had been allowed to live within the city borders before 1796.

The Jewish community grew considerably during the 19th century. A new synagogue opened in 1809; a Jewish school opened in 1833. Construction began in 1839 on an even larger temple, which opened in 1840.

The Jewish community suffered a decline in membership at the end of the 19th century, as Jews started to move to larger cities in the western part of the Netherlands, notably Amsterdam. Nevertheless, Maastricht retained a significant Jewish community, which went through a period of growth in the 1930s, when a large number of Jewish refugees from Nazi Germany and other Eastern European countries settled within the city.

A Zionist youth organization sprouted after the Nazis took over the Netherlands in 1940. Local police and fellow citizens protected the Jewish community for some time. However, they could not prevent the deportation of large parts of the community between June 1942 and April 1943. Most of the deportees were eventually killed in Auschwitz and Sobibor. Some Jews managed to hide, especially in the countryside; others fled across the border into Belgium.

The Jewish community had severely declined by the end of World War II. Jewish life reappeared after the liberation of Maastricht in 1944, and the synagogue of Maastricht, which had been ransacked and used as a storage depot during the war, was reopened in 1952. However, declining numbers of Jews in the city eventually led to the forced merger of the Jewish communities of Maastricht, Heerlen, Roermond and Venlo in 1986 to ensure the community's survival. Rabbi Ya'akov Shapiro was inaugurated in 2001 to serve the community, which is now the only existing Jewish community in the province of Limburg.

Number of Jews in Maastricht and surroundings:

- 1782: 2
- 1794: 22
- 1809: 207
- 1840: 375
- 1869: 429
- 1899: 405
- 1930: 247
- 1951: 115
- 1998: 61 (includes all members affiliated to the Jewish community of Limburg)
