= Kalman Ber =

Ashkenazi Chief Rabbi of Israel (2024–present)

Rabbi Kalman Meir Ber
- קלמן מאיר בר
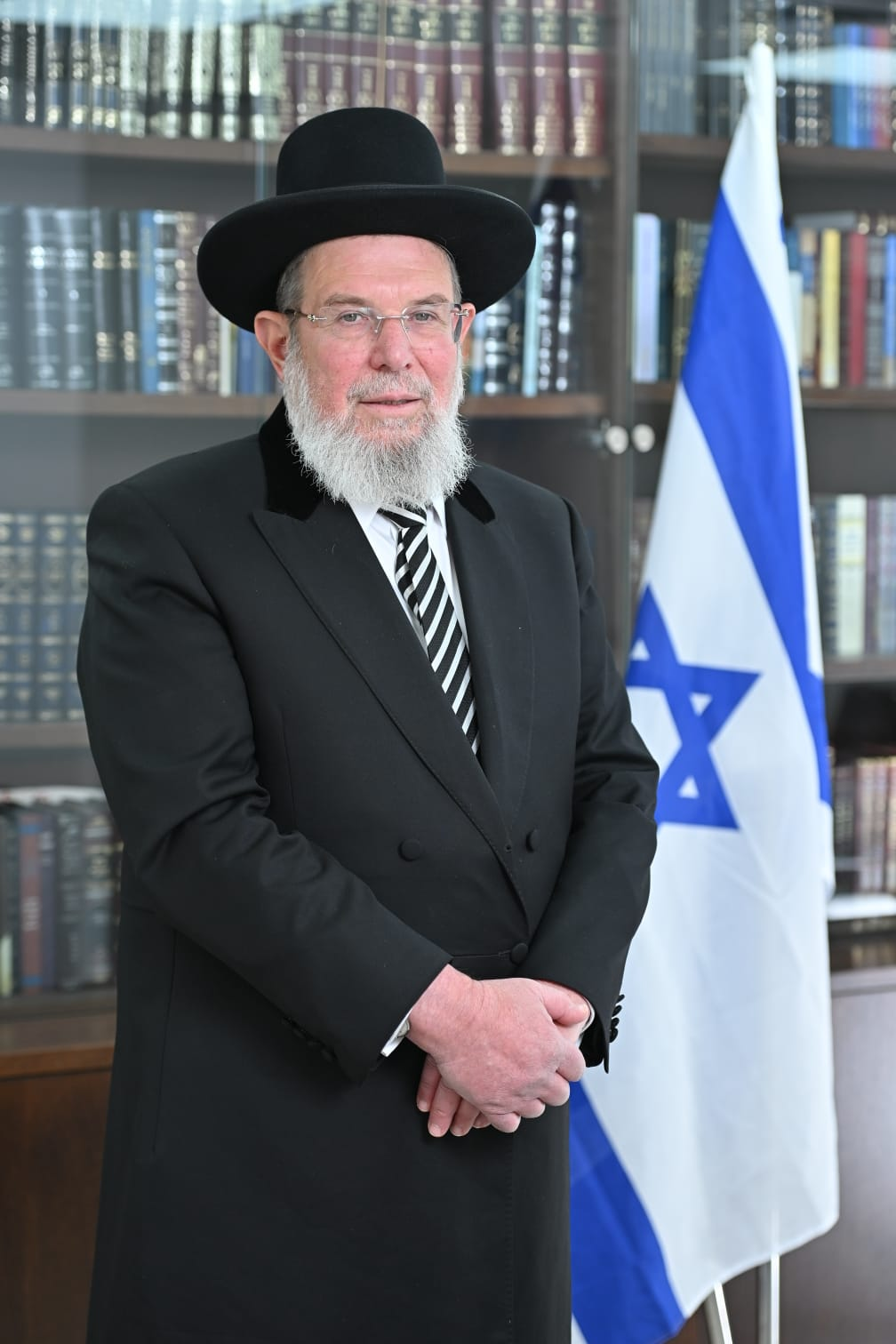
- Title: Ashkenazi Chief Rabbi of Israel

Personal life
- Born: Kalman Meir Ber; 24 December 1957 (age 68) Tel Aviv, Israel

Religious life
- Religion: Judaism
- Denomination: Orthodox

Jewish leader
- Predecessor: David Lau
- Began: June 30, 2024
- Ended: Incumbent
- Other: Chief Rabbi of Netanya
- Residence: Modi'in-Maccabim-Re'ut

Rabbi Kalman Meir Ber (Hebrew: קלמן מאיר בר; born 24 December 1957 is the Ashkenazi Chief Rabbi of Israel and President of the Chief Rabbinate Council. Previously, he served as the rabbi of Netanya and a rabbi in Yeshivat Kerem B'Yavneh, among other positions.

== Biography ==
Ber was born in 1957 in the Yad Eliyahu neighborhood of Tel Aviv, Israel. He is the son of Miriam Ita, a descendant of Rabbi Akiva Eiger through his grandson Rabbi Leibel Eiger and the Rebbes of Izhbitza-Radzin.

He studied at the high school yeshiva in Netanya under the leadership of Rabbi Simcha HaCohen Kook. After graduating high school, he began studying at the Kerem B'Yavneh Hesder Yeshiva in Yavne. He served in the IDF as a soldier in the Nahal Brigade and then spent decades in the reserves. During his years at the yeshiva, he studied the writings of Rabbi Kook together with Rabbi Uzi Kalkheim. He later studied at the yeshiva's kollel and was ordained to the city rabbinate by the chief rabbis, Rabbi Avraham Shapira and Rabbi Mordechai Eliyahu.

In 1986, he was appointed by Rabbi Chaim Yaakov Goldvicht to serve as a maggid shiur in yeshiva. In addition to his role in the yeshiva, he served as the head of the Midrasha in Kibbutz Hafetz Haim and head of the Talpiot College of Education. He served on a rabbinical mission as the head of the Yavne Yeshiva in Antwerp, and as the rabbi of the Mizrahi community "Rabbi Amiel". He presented a Torah class on Kol Chai radio and currently presents a weekly Torah class on the Kikar HaShabbat website.

=== Rabbi of Netanya ===
In late 2014, after 26 years in which no one had held the position, Rabbi Bar was elected to serve as Ashkenazi Chief Rabbi of the city of Netanya. In the election for the position, he received the support of the Jewish Home Party, The Rebbe of Sanz, and Mayor Miriam Feierberg.

As part of his role, he established the "Behidur Kashrut" kashrut system within the kashrut system of the Netanya Rabbinate.

=== Ashkenazi Chief Rabbi of Israel ===
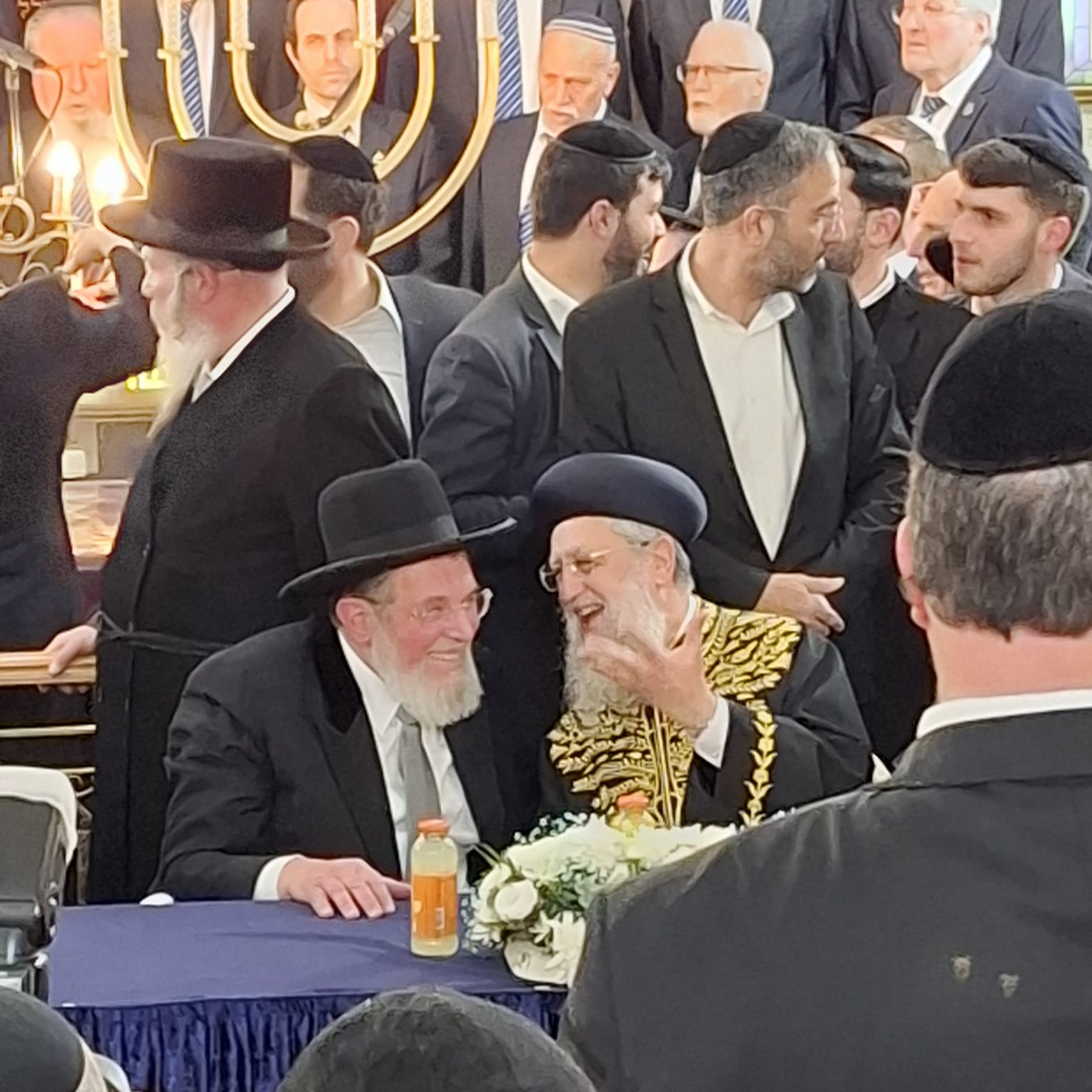
Ber with Rabbi David Yosef

In 2024, he ran in the elections for the Chief Rabbinate of Israel for the position of Ashkenazi Chief Rabbi. In the first round of elections, Ber received 40 votes, tying with Rabbi Micha Halevi, the rabbi of Petah Tikva, who also received 40 votes. In this round, Rabbi Ber won the support of the Degel HaTorah party, Rabbi Yaakov Shapira, Rabbi Gavriel Saraf, Rabbi Aharon Friedman, and other rabbis.

In a second round of elections held about two month later, Rabbi Ber was elected to the position with a majority of 77 votes, compared to 58 who supported Rabbi Halevi. In this round, Ber gained support from Rabbis Mordechai Greenberg, Aryeh Stern, Eitan Isman, David Stav, Elyakim Levanon, and other rabbis from the Mercaz HaRav and Kerem Yavne networks.

On 4 November 2024, Rabbi Ber declared his allegiance at a ceremony at Beit HaNassi, and began serving as Chief Rabbi of Israel.

== Family ==
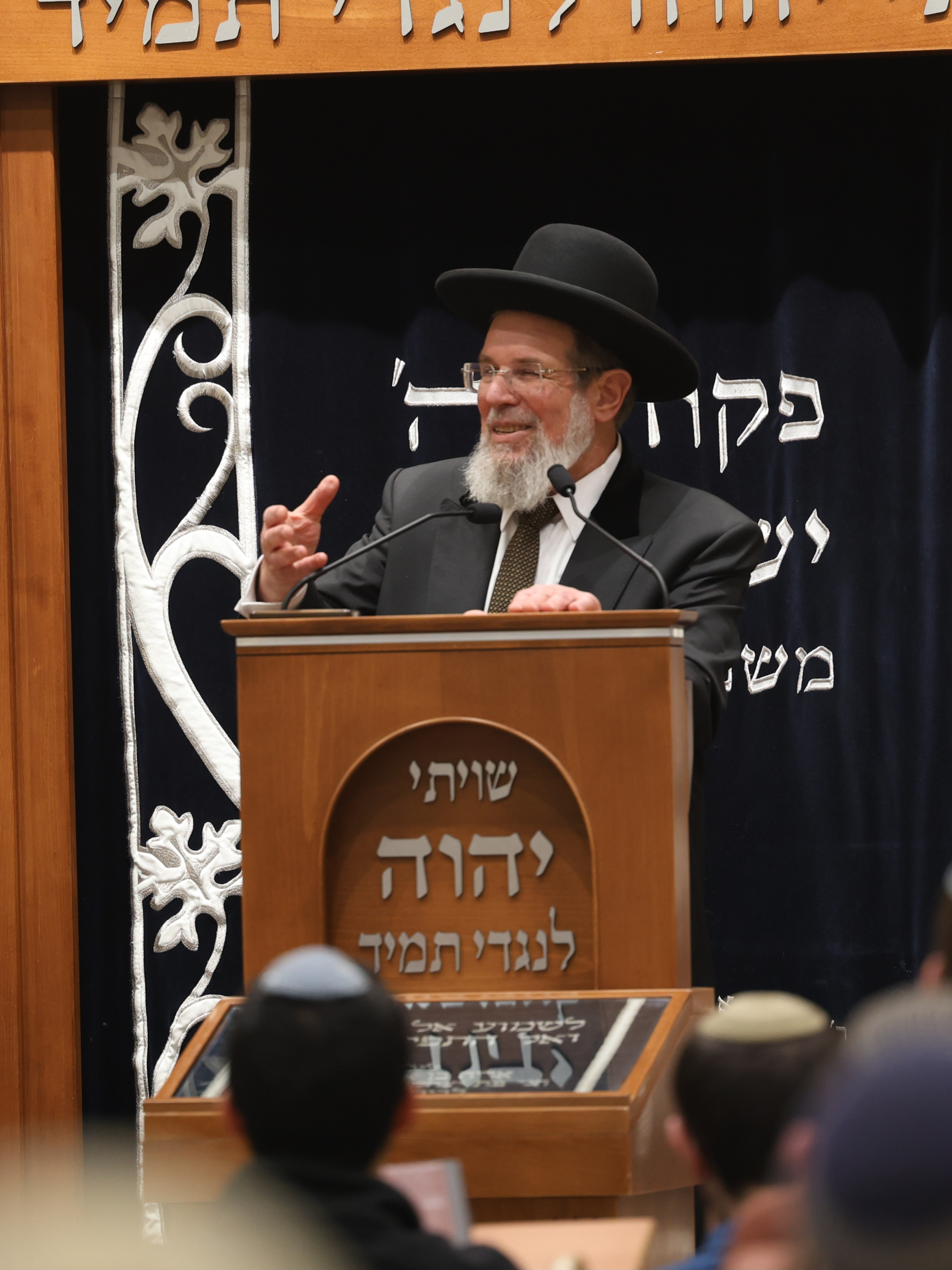
Ber speaking

Ber is married to Dafna, née Elitzur, a teacher at the Rabbi Haran high school, granddaughter of Rabbi Sussman Rieger. Her grandmother Tova Rieger was the sister of Rabbi Shalom Nathan Raanan and Rebbetzin Pnina Kahane Shapira, wife of Rabbi Avraham Elkana Kahane Shapira (Rabbi Bar was one of his students).The rabbi has six children. He lives in Netanya. His son-in-law, Rabbi Avraham Fellheimer, is the head of the kollel in Netanya. His brother, Rabbi Moshe Avraham Ber, serves as the Ashkenazi rabbi of the Yad Eliyahu neighborhood in Tel Aviv.

Jewish titles
Preceded by David Lau	Ashkenazi Chief Rabbi of Israel; 2024-Present	Succeeded by
