= Bardak =

Israeli comedy show

- ברדק

Comedy career
- Years active: 2020–present
- Genres: Comedy, Satire
- Subjects: Israeli culture, Haredi Jewish life
- Members: Meni Wakshtock; Efi Skakovsky

YouTube information
- Channel: ברדק
- Subscribers: 131,000
- Last updated: 12 April 2026

Bardak (Hebrew: ברדק, lit. 'chaos' or 'mess') is an Israeli sketch comedy group known for its satirical skits and videos, often focusing on themes related to Haredi Jewish life and broader Israeli society. The group's work is widely circulated online and has gained significant popularity in Israel.

As of August 2024, the group's YouTube channel has over 90,000 subscribers and over 35 million total views.

== Producers ==
The sketches are produced by Efi Skakovsky, and Meni Wakshtock, both graduates of Orthodox yeshivas. Skakovsky is a graduate of Yeshivas Rashi. Wakshtock is a graduate of Yeshivas Knesses Hagedolah and studied film at the Jewish Film School and advertising and communications at the Ono Academic College. The two met when Skakovsky acted in a video which Wakshtock produced, after which the two decided to start producing comedy videos about the Haredi lifestyle.

== Content ==
Wakshtock serves as the producer, director, and occasional actor, while Skakovsky is the main actor. The group's formation and initial work focused on creating online content, leveraging platforms like YouTube and social media for distribution.

Bardak's comedic style is characterized by observational humor, finding humor in everyday situations within Israeli culture. While a significant portion of their work focuses on the Haredi community, their content also addresses broader issues related to Israeli culture, politics, and social dynamics. Their approach is generally lighthearted, avoiding overtly political stances, and aiming to bridge cultural divides through relatable humor. Recurring characters and catchphrases are a common element, contributing to their recognition and popularity.

In the first season, the sketches, which are between one and three minutes long, were published once a week, on Motza'ei Shabbat. In the second season, the sketches, which are between one and five minutes long, are published approximately once a month.

The sketches in the first season were filmed during the COVID-19 pandemic, and some dealt with the ways in which the ultra-Orthodox public was coping with the pandemic.

The creators are careful to maintain the restrictions accepted in Haredi society, and in the videos, for example, women are not shown in frontal shots.

Bardak is known for several popular skits and recurring characters, including:

- "Eisenbach": A series of skits featuring a Haredi man involved in various chaotic and humorous situations. This series is one of their most recognizable works.
- "Mr. Goldblum": A character portraying an American Jewish philanthropist, often depicted in humorous interactions with Israeli culture.

== Distribution ==
Bardak's primary distribution method is online through platforms like YouTube and various social media channels, such as WhatsApp, as well as news website Kikar HaShabbat. This online presence has allowed them to reach a wide audience, encompassing both religious and secular Israelis. Their popularity has led to collaborations with various Israeli brands and organizations, further expanding their reach. The group's work has been featured in various Israeli media outlets, and they have been interviewed on television and radio programs, solidifying their presence in Israeli popular culture.

== Seasons ==
- Season 1 - On 8 August 2020, the first episode of the first season was released, which lasted until 14 March 2021. The season consisted of 23 episodes.
- Season 2 - After a break of several months, the second season was released on 25 August 2021. This season featured singer Zion Golan, media personality Menachem Toker, Nissim Black, and Ofer Mimran.

As of December 2024, they have released over 80 episodes.

== Reception ==
The group's videos became popular among the ultra-Orthodox and national religious publics and received hundreds of thousands of views. Several of the group's videos feature Eisenbach, a fanatical Jerusalemite protester who organizes an ultra-Orthodox demonstration and says that the road will be blocked by the demonstration until "a moped won't pass" (Tustus lo ya'avor). This phrase has become common in ultra-Orthodox demonstrations.

Bardak's contribution to Israeli comedy has been noted for its unique perspective and its ability to address potentially sensitive cultural topics with humor. Their work is considered to have contributed to bridging cultural divides by finding common ground through relatable situations and characters.
