= 2024 Israeli chief rabbi elections =

Elections for the chief rabbis of Israel

2024 Sephardic Chief Rabbi Election
- 29 September 2024
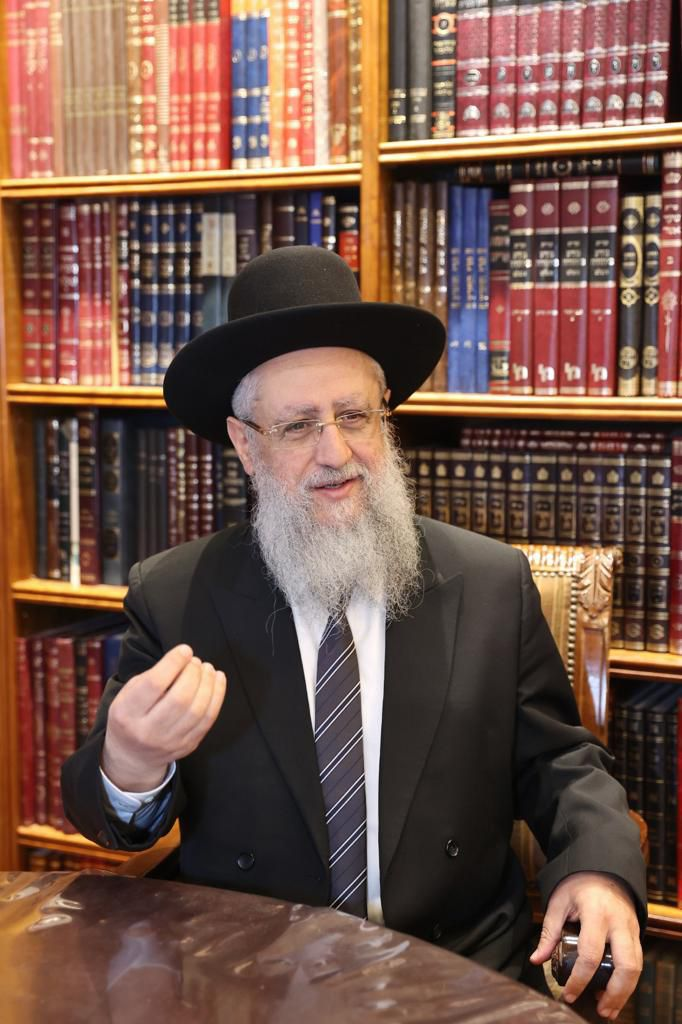

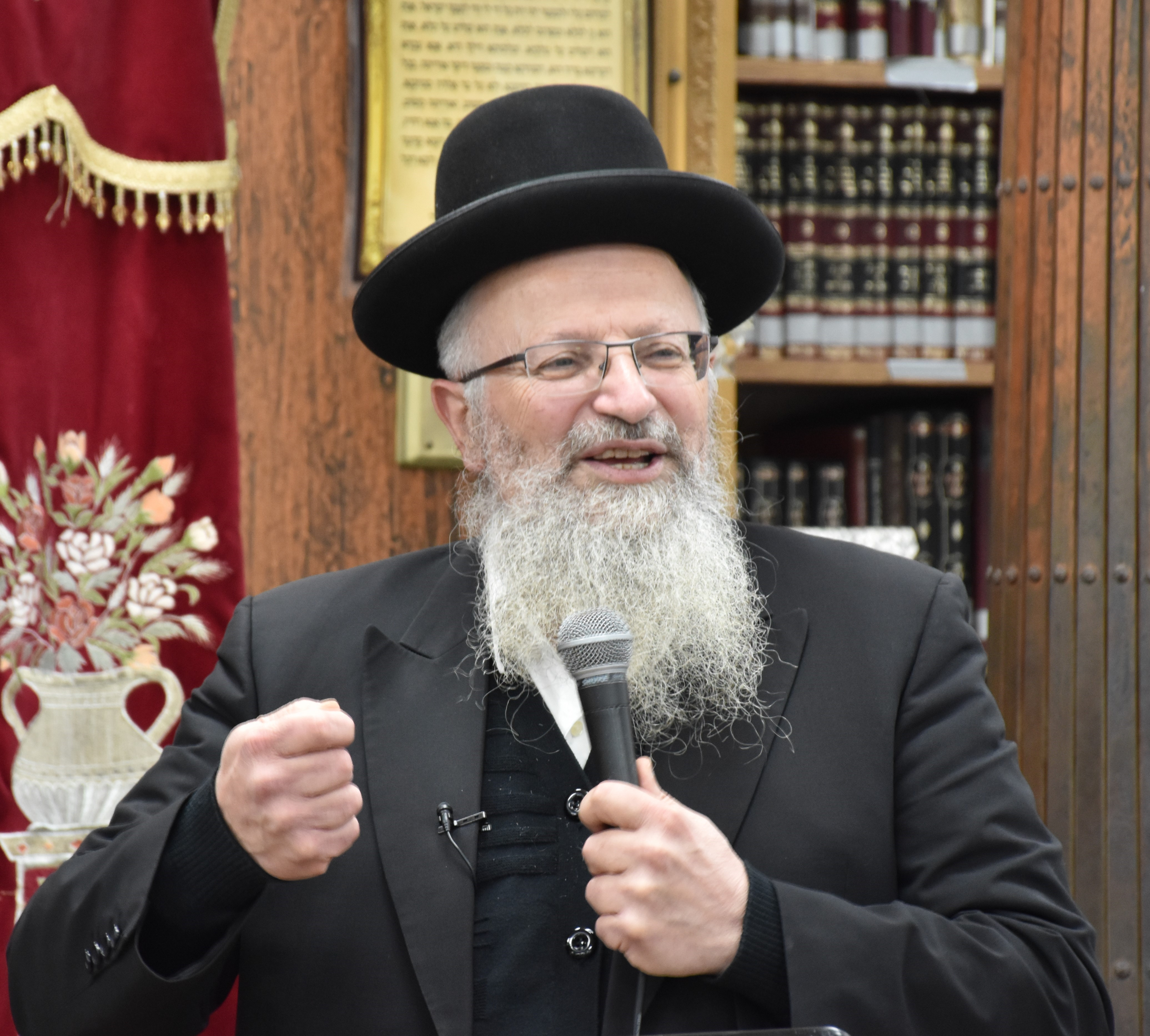

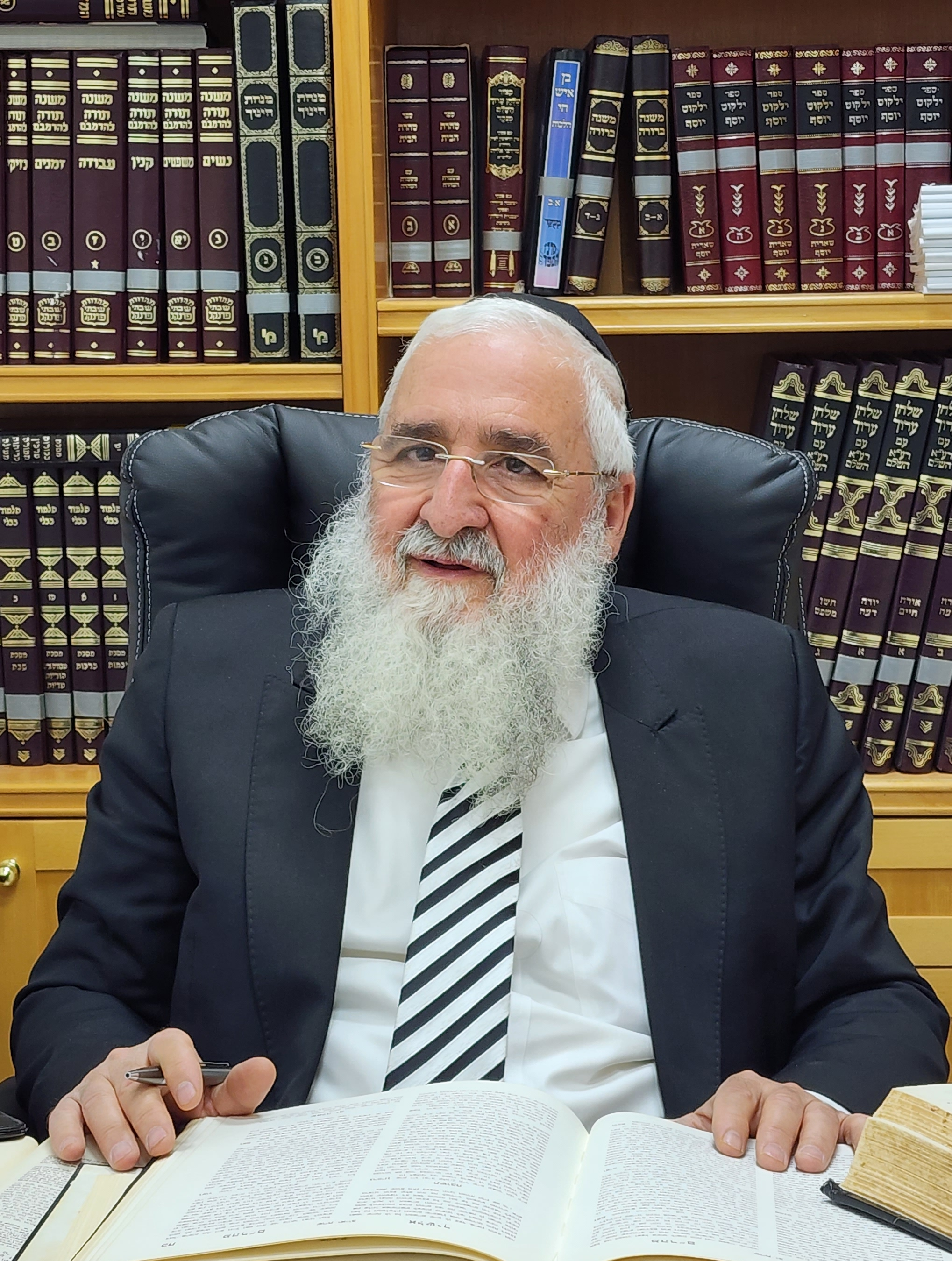
Candidate	David Yosef	Shmuel Eliyahu	Michael Amos
Popular vote	72	43	21

2024 Ashkenazi Chief Rabbi Election
- 29 September 2024 (first round); 31 October 2024 (second round)
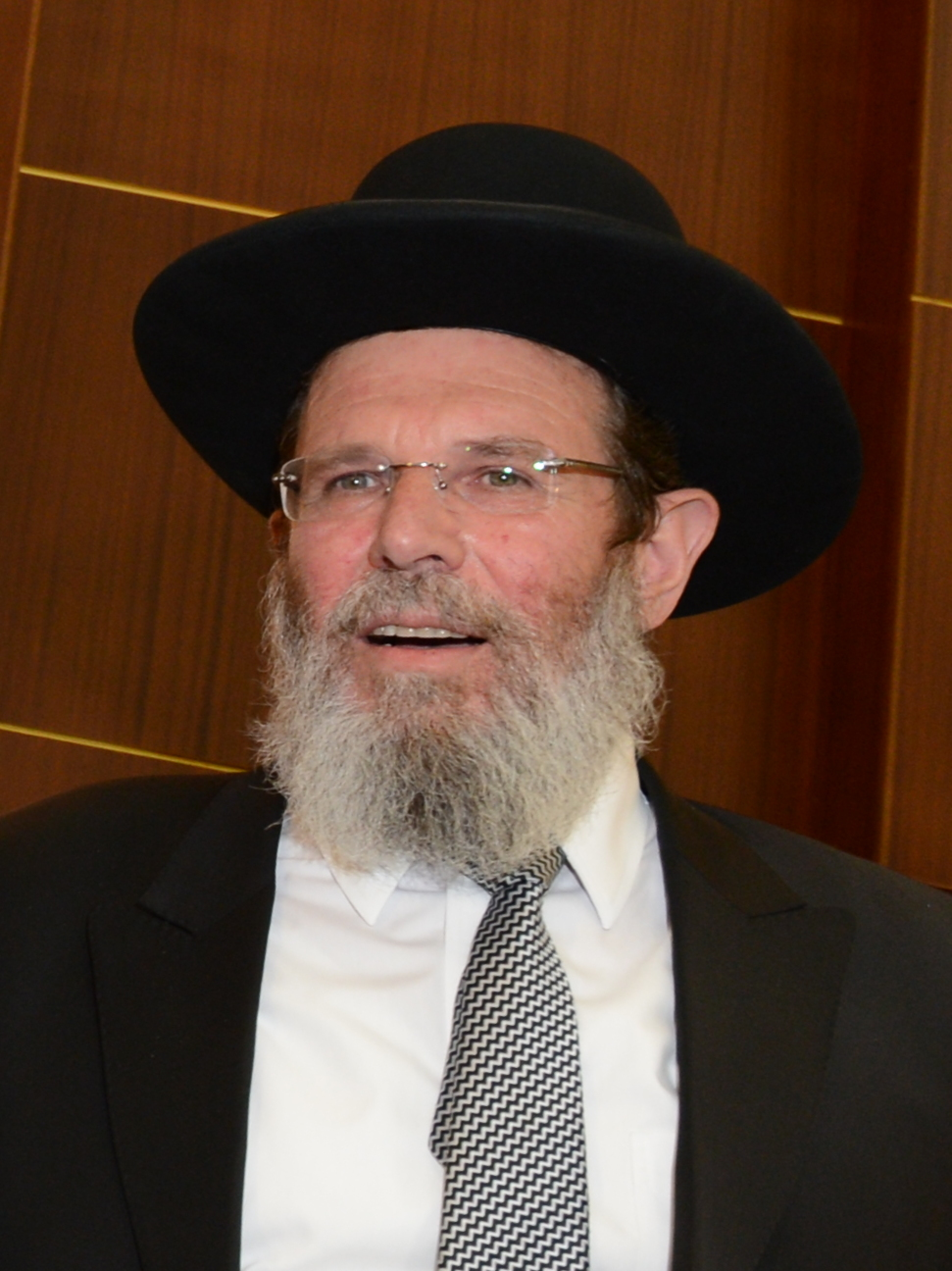

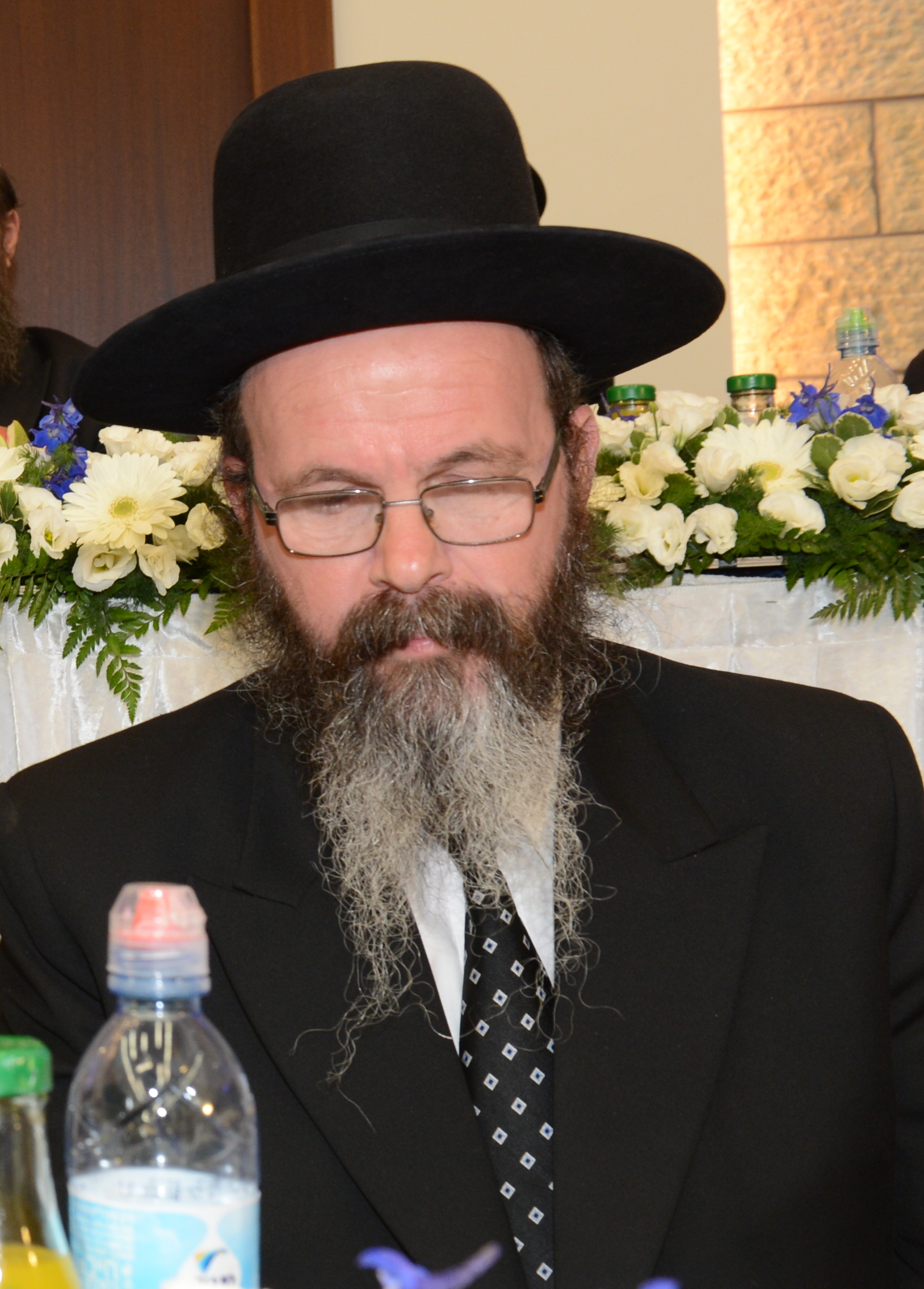
Candidate	Kalman Ber	Micha Halevi
Popular vote	77	58

Elections for Chief Rabbis of Israel were held in Jerusalem in 2024. The elections were initially scheduled for 2023, however they were delayed multiple times.

== Background ==
Chief rabbis serve as the head of Israeli religious infrastructure. This includes managing kosher certification, Jewish marriages, and deaths They also have significant influence over the question of "Who is a Jew?" The position is held for a 10-year term, with incumbents unable to run for reelection.

== Timing ==
Incumbent Chief Rabbis Lau and Yosef were elected for a 10 year term of office in July 2013, so elections were expected to take place in August 2023. However, Minister of Religious Services Michael Malchieli had the elections delayed, arguing that the proximity to the upcoming municipal elections created conflicts of interest. Some argued that the delay was in fact political, and designed to help the campaign of Yehuda Deri, brother of Shas chairman Aryeh Deri, to become the new Sephardi Chief Rabbi. The election was rescheduled for April 2024.

The outbreak of the Gaza war in October 2023 meant that the municipal elections were themselves postponed to February 2024. The incumbent Chief Rabbis' terms were therefore extended again, and elections postponed. However, disputes over the composition of the electoral body, including a court requirement to appoint women as electors, led to further delay. During this time, the extensions to the tenures of serving Chief Rabbis Yitzhak Yosef and David Lau expired. Elections were eventually held on the 29th September, with a second-round runoff for Ashkenazi Chief Rabbi on the 31st October.

== Results ==
The first round of elections was held on September 29 at the Ramada Hotel. There were five major candidates for the Ashkenazi election and three for the Sephardic. David Yosef was elected Sephardic chief rabbi, making him the third member of the Yosef family to serve as chief rabbi. However, Kalman Ber and Micha Halevi both tied with 40 votes in the Ashkenazi chief rabbi election. A second round was then held on October 31, which Kalman Ber won.
