= Yona Metzger =

Former Ashkenazi Chief Rabbi of Israel from 2003 to 2013

Rabbi Yona Metzger יונה מצגר
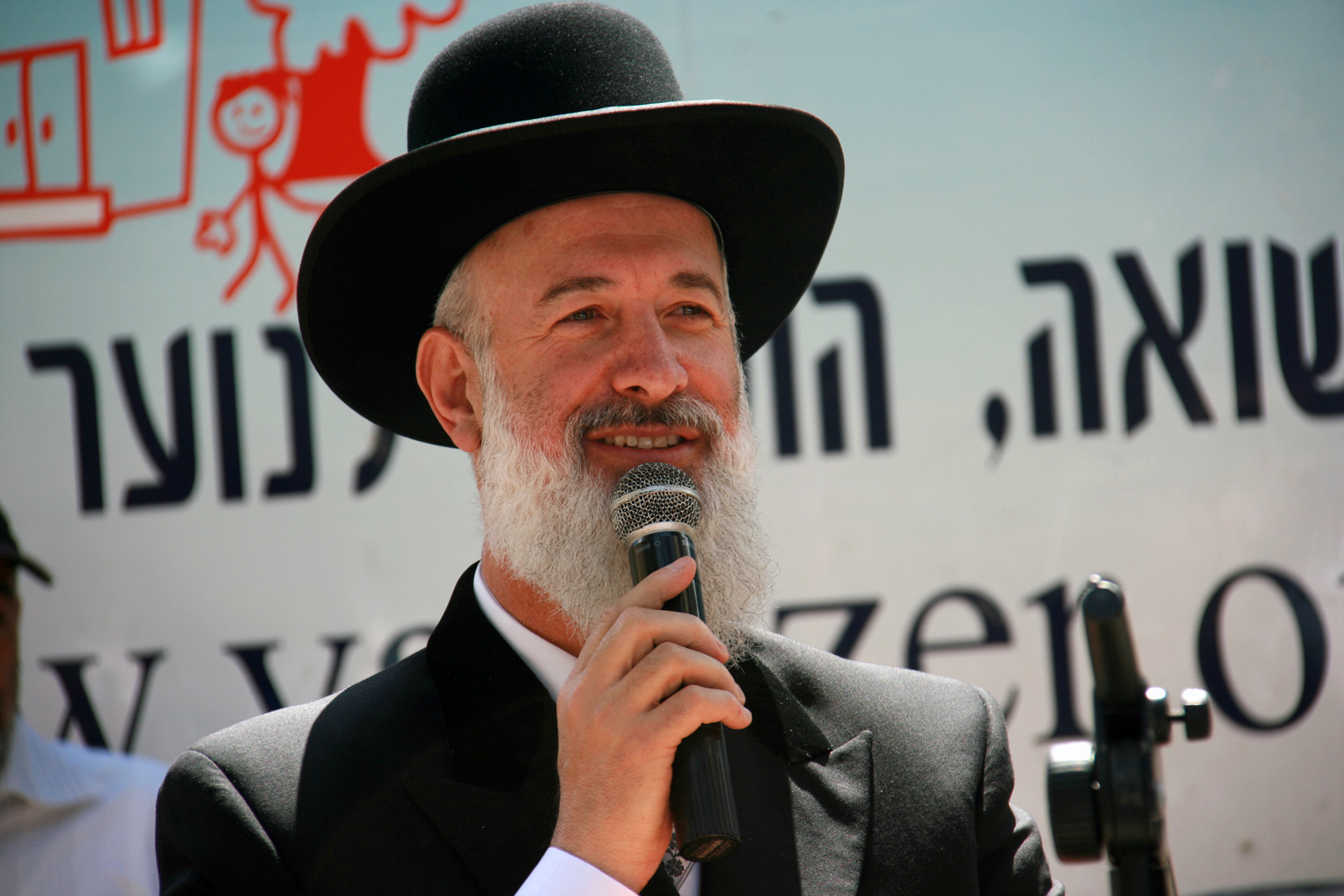

Religious life
- Religion: Judaism
- Denomination: Orthodox

Jewish leader
- Predecessor: Yisrael Meir Lau
- Successor: David Lau
- Position: Ashkenazi Chief Rabbi of Israel
- Began: 2003
- Ended: 2013

Yona Metzger (Hebrew: יונה מצגר; born 1953) is an Israeli Orthodox rabbi and the former Ashkenazi Chief Rabbi of Israel. In 2013, while chief rabbi, a fraud investigation was opened. Metzger later pleaded guilty to a number of corruption charges, was tried and convicted, and after a plea bargain was rejected, served prison time.

== Early life ==
Metzger was born in Haifa in 1953. He served in the Israel Defense Forces as a chaplain in the 7th Armored Brigade, and was discharged with the rank of captain. Metzger received his ordination from the Yeshivat Kerem BeYavne hesder yeshiva before working as a religious teacher. He served as rabbi of the Tiferet Zvi Synagogue in Tel Aviv, and was later appointed regional rabbi of northern Tel Aviv. Metzger has written ten books, two of which were awarded prizes by the President of Israel.

While Metzger is from a national religious family and educational background, he had been closely identified with Haredi Judaism, and often sought the advice of Degel HaTorah's late spiritual leader Yosef Shalom Eliashiv. Some observers claimed that this made Metzger an excellent candidate to represent both communities, with one reporter calling him "undoubtedly the most moderate and most Zionist candidate". His supporters have often compared him to his immediate predecessor, Yisrael Meir Lau, who was seen as having a foot in every camp, which helped him in dealing with different kinds of Jews, particularly secular ones.

== Ashkenazi Chief Rabbi of Israel ==
Metzger was elected Chief Rabbi of Israel in April 2003. At 50, he was the youngest Chief Rabbi in Israel's history, until his successor, David Lau, who was elected at the age of 47 in 2013.

While Chief Rabbi, Metzger was active in attempting to reach out to diverse groups of people, both Jews and non-Jews. He attempted to facilitate the maintaining of kashrut standards in Israel by employing technology, for instance, by activating steam pumps via cell phone for cooking meat in order to avoid issues of bishul akum (the cooking of food by a non-Jew). Metzger was also involved in strengthening ties between Israeli and Diaspora standards of kashrut in order to make them more standardized and consistent.

Metzger was a prominent in keeping up interest in the cases of several "lost Israelis", notably Jonathan Pollard and Ron Arad. He repeatedly brought up Arad in the course of official meetings with various Muslim dignitaries. He was also involved in keeping up the pressure on both the Israeli and various Arab governments to protect the safety and negotiate the release of various Israeli prisoners taken captive by Hezbollah.

In 2004, Metzger announced an initiative to insert a special prayer for Jonathan Pollard into the daily prayer service. The prayer was written by Metzger, and is written in the style of a "Mishaberach prayer" intended for people in dire straits. Many Orthodox synagogues announced the adoption of the prayer into their liturgy.

=== Interfaith dialogue ===
Metzger worked to encourage friendly relationships with other religious communities. One idea that Metzger proposed was the establishment of a religious United Nations in Jerusalem. He first advocated this in late 2004 after mediating a highly publicized dispute between Jerusalem Haredim and the Armenian Christian community. Under Metzger's plan, the new body would contain representatives of the world's religions, as opposed to nations. Metzger has also suggested that the Dalai Lama could lead the assembly. The Dalai Lama was reportedly very excited at the idea, and pledged to help Metzger realize his plan. Other supporters include Frederico Major, the co-president of the Alliance for Civilizations, a Spanish lobby group for international conflict resolution.

On a February 2007 trip to India, Metzger joined other prominent rabbis in signing a declaration against violence with local Hindu leaders, as part of a summit organized by the World Council of Religious Leaders. One of the points emphasized by the participants was the commonality between Jews and Hindus, particularly in regards to ongoing violence at the hands of Muslims. Metzger noted in his remarks, "Jews have lived in India for 2,000 years, and have never been discriminated against. This is something unparalleled in human history."

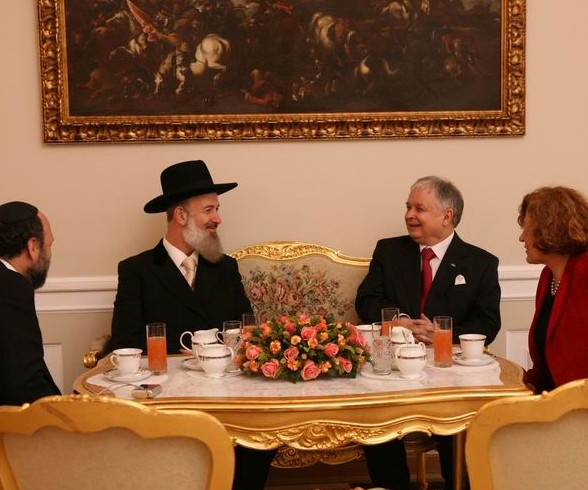
Metzger with Polish president Lech Kaczynski

In March 2008, Metzger supported an interfaith conference proposed by King Abdullah of Saudi Arabia.

=== Accepting ===
During the "bus conflict" about mixed seating between men and women, Metzger stated that this is not a "Haredi country", and urged the ultra-Orthodox to not push their opinions on the others and be more accepting.

=== Relationship with Armenians ===
During his term, Metzger was involved in several notable incidents of rapprochement with the global and Israeli-Armenian communities.

In December 2004, Metzger was instrumental in easing tensions between Jerusalem's Haredim and Armenian Christians following an incident in which a Haredi yeshiva student spat on an Armenian archbishop. Metzger gained further attention in November 2005, during a visit to the Memorial of Armenian Genocide and Genocide Museum in Yerevan. He laid a wreath, and gave a short speech in which he acknowledged the pain of the Armenian people and emphasized that though Israel does not formally recognize the Armenian genocide as a genocide, he does "use that term". Metzger went on to say, "No other nation can understand the pain of the Armenians better than Jews." Metzger's comments received a very positive reaction in Armenia, particularly at the implication that more Israelis are changing their positions on using the word "genocide" to refer to the Armenians.

Turkey's Jews, on the other hand, themselves a vulnerable minority population, reacted with some discomfort at Metzger putting them in an awkward situation. The spokesman for Turkey's Chief Rabbi commented, "Let the historians do their job, and then we will see."

== Controversy ==
=== 2003 election ===
Metzger's appointment was controversial because he was not a halachic authority. Metzger had never served as a religious judge (dayan), though his role as Chief Rabbi required him to sit as President of the Rabbinical Supreme Court for five years, before switching with his Sephardic counterpart to be head of the Chief Rabbinate Council.

=== Allegations ===
In February 2005, the Israeli police began a formal criminal investigation of Metzger regarding allegations of fraud and bribery related to benefits he received from a Jerusalem hotel. Metzger was questioned twice, and denied any wrongdoing, but suspended himself from the Rabbinical High Court in June 2005, while waiting to see whether or not the Israeli Attorney General, Menachem Mazuz, decided to indict him. No charges were brought, and Metzger and his supporters dismissed all of the accusations against him as part of an ongoing smear campaign against him.

=== Disputes and disagreements ===
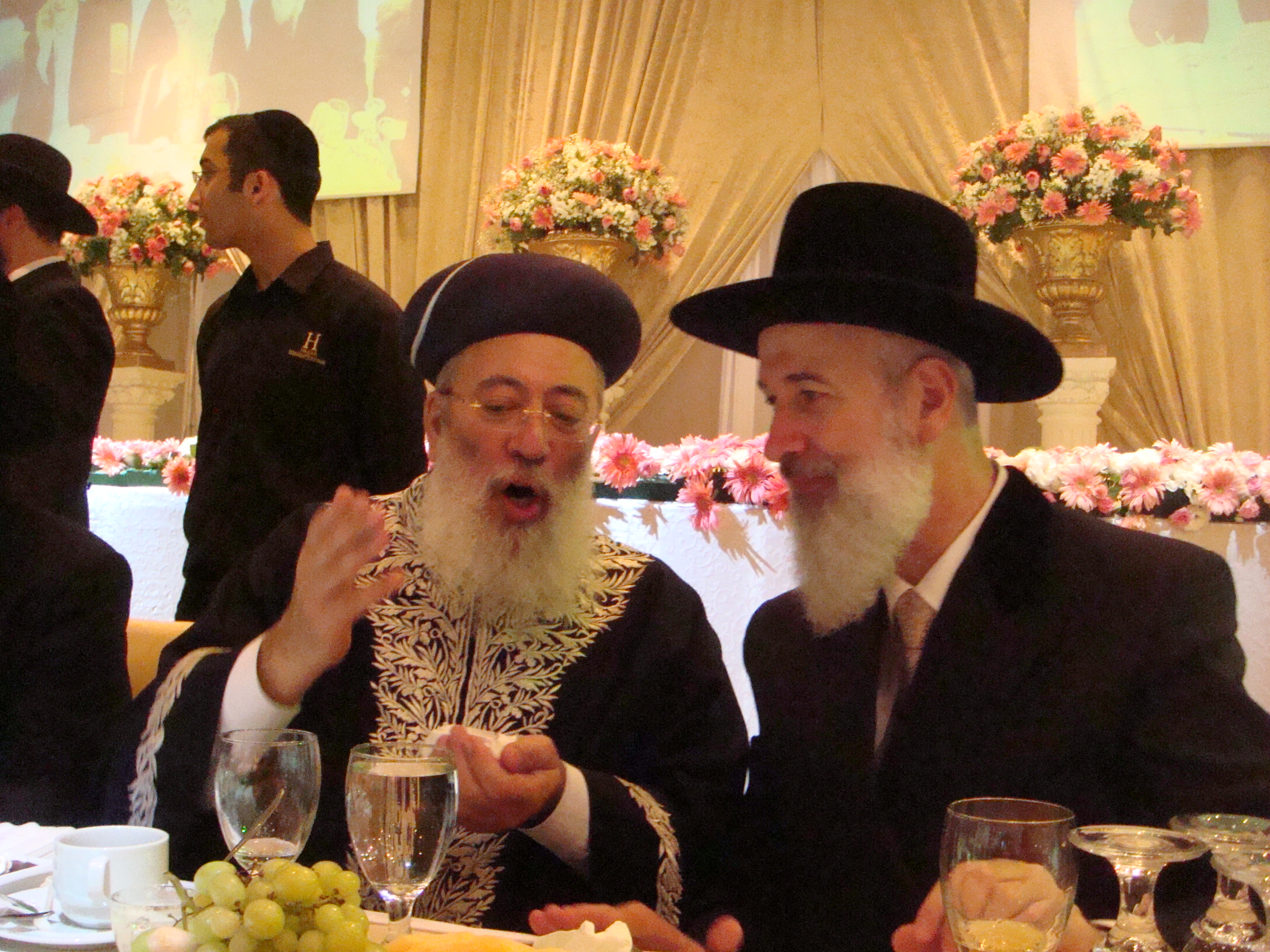
Rabbis Metzger and Amar

On 3 April 2006, Attorney General Mazuz announced that he was closing the Metzger investigation, and would not seek an indictment, citing a lack of sufficient evidence. However, he added that in light of various "disturbing" information that came to light during the investigation, including contradictory statements given to the police, that the Chief Rabbi should resign. Mazuz also called on the Justice Ministry to consider bringing Metzger's case "before the Dayanim Selection Committee ... to consider ending his term in office" if Metzger did not resign.

The rabbi's supporters included some of Israel's most notable religious figures: Metzger met with a group of high-profile rabbis, including his political patron, leading Lithuanian rabbi Yosef Shalom Eliashiv, as well as former Chief Rabbis Ovadia Yosef, Mordechai Eliyahu, and Avraham Shapira. The rabbis praised his character and integrity, heavily criticized Mazuz's behavior, and promised to help Metzger fight the public cries for his resignation. Rabbi Shapira reportedly told Metzger that he was being "watched over" by a "special angel in heaven", and Rabbi Eliyahu commented that in his judgement, Metzger was "pure and clear as snow".

Metzger said that the ruling had been issued "without giving me the opportunity to defend myself. This was a violation of the basic rights enjoyed by every individual." Shortly after Mazuz's comments, the rabbi's spokespeople declared that he had no intention of resigning, and criticized Mazuz for convicting Metzger in the public square by tarnishing his reputation. Some in the Israeli media castigated Mazuz for overstepping his role as Attorney General.

Metzger filed a petition with the Supreme Court of Israel to protest Mazuz's public declaration, alleging that his image had been destroyed without a chance to tell his side of the story, and accusing Mazuz of engaging in "child-like" tactics. Metzger's lawyer charged that Mazuz's report on Metzger contained unverifiable information, and that it constituted a personal attack on the rabbi without giving him the benefit of a defense or hearing. The petition requested that the second half of Mazuz's 30-page report, in which he harshly attacked Metzger's conduct and recommended his removal, be stricken from the record.

In late May 2006, the new Justice Minister, Chaim Ramon, told reporters that he intended to follow up on Mazuz's recommendation and attempt to force Metzger's resignation. It was also reported that outgoing Chief Justice Aharon Barak had attempted to mediate between the parties, proposing a compromise in which all of Mazuz's report would stay in, but that Mazuz would sign a statement retracting his personal criticism of Metzger's character and declaring, "There is nothing which obliges the Minister of Justice to take administrative measures against Metzger", in effect leaving further action to the discretion of the incoming Justice Minister. Metzger's lawyer refused the deal, saying that the damage to Metzger's reputation from the report was too important to be left in as part of a compromise.

In March 2007, Supreme Court President Dorit Beinisch recommended that Mazuz re-write the report and remove the allegations she called "gossip and rumors".

=== Return to office ===
In February 2008, after an investigation prompted by Mazuz's report and a recommendation by Justice Minister Daniel Friedmann that Metzger be impeached, the Justice Ministry appointments committee authorized the end of Metzger's suspension, permitting him to return to his position on the Supreme Rabbinical Court. However, in late March, the Knesset Interior Affairs and Environment Committee ratified an amendment to the Chief Rabbinate Law that effectively prohibited Metzger from trading positions with Shlomo Amar, as is standard practice halfway through their ten-year terms. The author of the amendment claimed that it was not directed against Metzger, arguing that it, in fact, would allow for future "flexibility", permitting Chief Rabbis lacking training as rabbinical judges, as Metzger does, to "forgo" becoming President of the rabbinical courts. Some Metzger critics, however, argued that the law was relevant only to Metzger because he is the first-ever Chief Rabbi to be elected to the position who has no experience as a rabbinical judge.

==== Potential long-term effects ====
When Mazuz asked Metzger to resign in 2005, the story initially sparked some debate over the necessity of having two Israeli Chief Rabbis at all, or of maintaining the Chief Rabbinate as an institution. Some suggested that one way of preserving the integrity and relevance of the office might be to convince the religious Ashkenazi communities of Israel to decline to hold elections to replace Metzger, should he resign. This move would have consolidated the post from two seats to one, and help eliminate one of the most public representations of the office's perceived anachronism often cited by its critics. However, since then there has been little follow-up.

On 12 December 2011, the Israeli daily Israel Hayom reported that Metzger had received an offer to serve as Chief Rabbi of the United Kingdom of Great Britain and Northern Ireland at the end of Chief Rabbi Lord Jonathan Sacks term of office in 2013.

=== Comments on the Palestinians ===
Metzger gave an interview with the British Jewish News paper in January 2008 in which he advocated transferring the Palestinians in the Gaza Strip to the Sinai Peninsula, adding that though Israel welcomed peaceful Muslims, the world's Muslims needed to recognize that Jerusalem belongs to the Jewish people, saying, "You have another place, Mecca and Medina, you don't need a third place." Metzger also challenged the idea that Muslims had any connection to Jerusalem at all, noting that when Muslims pray to Mecca, their backs face Jerusalem. Metzger received some criticism from moderate Israelis for these remarks, as well as by some in the Arab world.

=== Fraud investigation and plea bargain ===
In June 2013, Lahav 433's National Fraud Investigations Unit raided Metzger's home and office on new suspicions of bribery, fraud, and money laundering. He was suspected of pocketing hundreds of thousands of shekels in gifts from donors destined for non-governmental organizations. On behalf of Metzger, his attorneys denied all allegations.

Metzger was arrested on November 18, 2013, after the investigation, and "charged with bribery, money laundering, and income tax violations". In February 2015, Attorney General Yehuda Weinstein indicted Metzger for accepting bribes, attempting to silence witnesses, and interfering with the investigation about his dealings.

On January 24, 2017, Metzger agreed to a plea bargain in which he admitted he was guilty of bribery, tax fraud, and interfering in the trial process. In exchange, he would receive a prison sentence of three-and-a-half years and pay 5 million shekels ($1.3 million), including his tax debt and a fine. However, a month later, on February 23, the Jerusalem District Court threw out the plea bargain, and sentenced Metzger to four-and-a-half years in prison.

== Published works ==
- Miyam Ha halacha (From the Sea of Halacha), an anthology of Metzger's responsa while Chief Rabbi of Tel Aviv
- Sufa Bamidbar (Storm in the Desert), a collection of responsa concerning the first Gulf War
- B'Magalei Hachaim (The Circles of Life), a two-volume work that received the Gold and Platinum Prizes from the President of Israel

Jewish titles
Preceded by Yisrael Meir Lau	Ashkenazi Chief Rabbi of Israel; 2003–2013	Succeeded by David Lau
