= Mordechai Lavi =

Israeli radio broadcaster

Mordechai Lavi מרדכי לביא
- Born: 1978 (age 47–48); Jerusalem, Israel
- Occupations: Radio host, news website owner

Mordechai Lavi (Hebrew: מרדכי לביא; born 1978) is an Israeli radio broadcaster and owner and general manager of the Kikar HaShabbat news website.

== Biography ==
Lavi was born in 1978 in Jerusalem.

Mordechai Lavi started his radio career at age 15 when he became interested in the budding Haredi pirate radio industry. He was fascinated and curious of how radio worked until he decided to search for one of these stations. He found the building where the clandestine Kol HaEmet radio station operated and tricked his way inside, and soon after began broadcasting music using a pseudonym. In 2003, he found his way to Kol Chai, the first legal Israeli radio station broadcasting to Haredim, and was asked to host a daily Haredi news show, which was unheard until then.

Lavi created the Kikar HaShabbat website in May 2009. He says that he was encouraged by someone who questioned, 'why someone wanting to get the news on Ynet might have to risk seeing unwanted content'. In April 2012, Lavi sold 50% of ownership to Ynet for a few million shekels.

In September 2011, Lavi left Kol Chai after nine years including hosting the main evening news show and started broadcasting the main morning current affairs magazine at Kol BaRama.

== Personal life ==
As of 2013, Lavi lives in Har Nof, Jerusalem, and father to six children.
