= David Lau =

Former Ashkenazi Chief Rabbi of Israel [2013–2024]

Rabbi David Baruch Lau דוד ברוך לאו
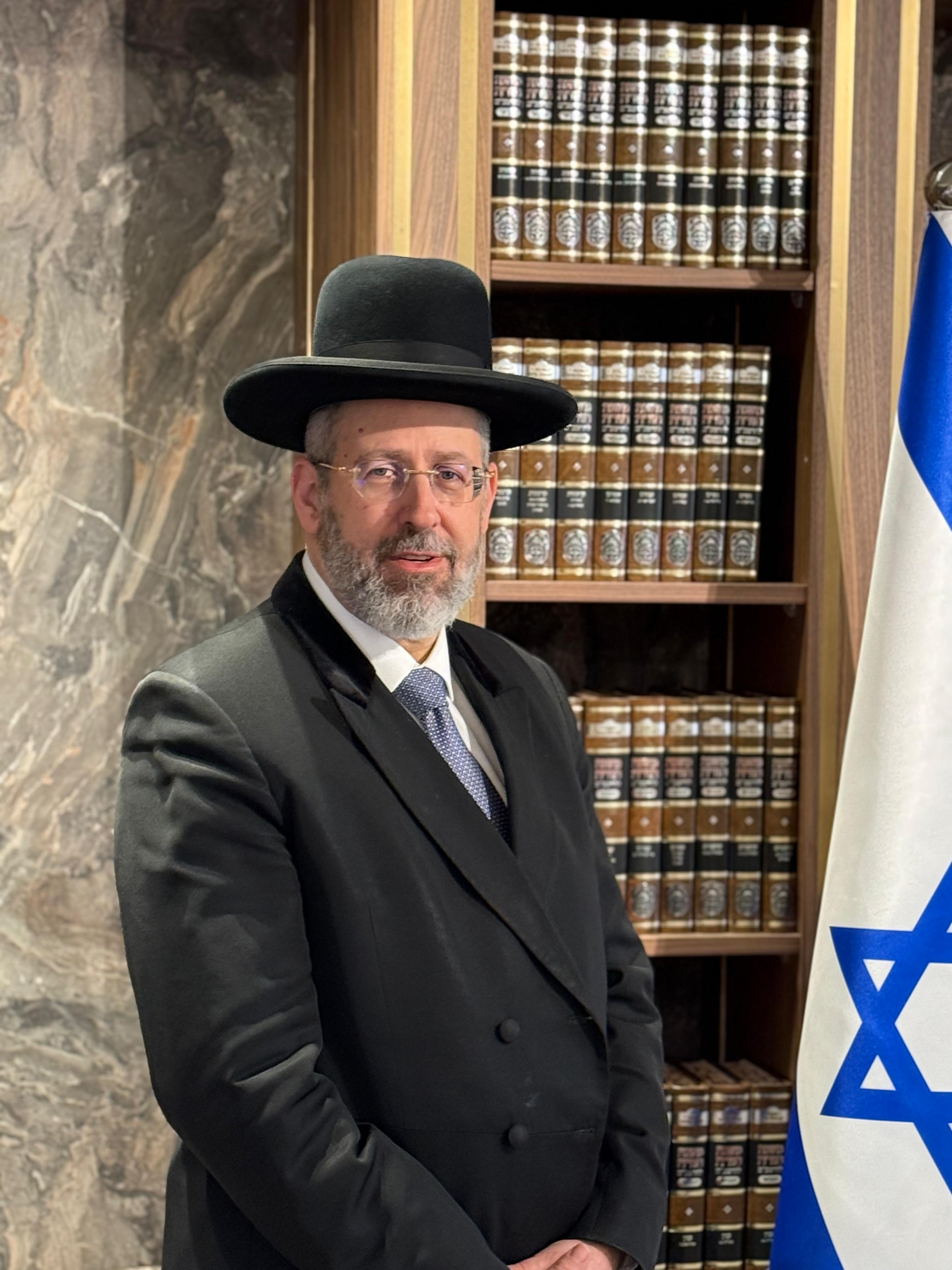
- Title: Ashkenazi Chief Rabbi of Israel

Personal life
- Born: David Baruch Lau; 13 January 1966 (age 60) Tel Aviv, Israel
- Parent: Yisrael Meir Lau

Religious life
- Religion: Judaism
- Denomination: Orthodox

Jewish leader
- Predecessor: Yona Metzger
- Successor: Kalman Ber
- Began: 2013
- Ended: 30 June 2024
- Other: Chief Rabbi of Shoham; Chief Rabbi of Modi'in-Maccabim-Re'ut
- Residence: Modi'in-Maccabim-Re'ut

David Baruch Lau (Hebrew: דוד לאו; born 13 January 1966) is an Israeli rabbi who served as the Ashkenazi Chief Rabbi of Israel from 2013 to 2024. He previously served as the Chief Rabbi of Modi'in-Maccabim-Re'ut, Israel, and as the Chief Rabbi of Shoham. Lau is the son of former Ashkenazi Chief Rabbi of Israel Yisrael Meir Lau.

== Early life ==
David Baruch Lau was born in Tel Aviv. He is the son of Yisrael Meir Lau, who served as the Chief Rabbi of Israel, and of Chaya Ita, the daughter of Yitzchak Yedidya Frankel, the rabbi of Tel Aviv. Lau was a member of the Ezra youth movement in Tel Aviv. He studied at Yeshivat HaYishuv HeHadash, and later at Beit Matityau Yeshiva and Ponevezh Yeshiva. His service in the Israel Defense Forces (IDF), which he completed with the rank of Rav séren (reserve major), was in the Military Rabbinate as a chaplain in the Intelligence Corps.

== Rabbinic career ==
Lau was the first rabbi of the town of Shoham. When the city of Modi'in was established, he was chosen as its Ashkenazi Chief Rabbi, alongside the Sephardi Chief Rabbi Eliyahu Alharar. Along with Alharar, he established Torah classes in the city, including on the subjects of kashrut, eruvim, and Jewish weddings.

Lau was one of the first rabbis in Israel to teach responsa over the internet. He has hosted programs over various media platforms on subjects such as the weekly Torah portion and halakhic questions and answers.

On 24 July 2013, Lau was elected as Ashkenazi Chief Rabbi of Israel. At the time, he was the youngest person (at age 47) to be elected to that position. The inauguration took place on 14 August 2013, at the official residence of the President of Israel. In 2020, during the coronavirus pandemic, Lau declared that no one should touch or kiss mezuzot, to prevent further spread of the virus.

In 2024, he stepped down as Chief Rabbi despite no successor having been appointed. On 31 October 2024, Kalman Ber was appointed to succeed Lau as Ashkenazi Chief Rabbi of Israel.

== Public Activity ==
Rabbi David Lau aspired to continue the legacy of the Chief Rabbinate in the spirit of Rabbi Abraham Isaac Kook and Rabbi Yitzhak HaLevi Herzog. In a manner reminiscent of Rabbi Kook, he conducted outreach visits to secular kibbutzim. He also introduced the subject of "Derech Eretz" – proper interpersonal conduct – into the "Semikhah", official rabbinical ordination exams.

Rabbi Lau was the first rabbi in Israel to address halachic (Jewish legal) questions online, through the "Moreshet" website. From the summer of 2006 until his election as Chief Rabbi of Israel, he appeared every Friday on the national television program "She'elat Rav" (Ask the rabbi) on Channel 1, answering halachic questions. Since 1999, he also hosted a daily radio segment called "Nekuda Yehudit" (A Jewish Point) on Kol Chai Radio. In 2021, he began hosting a weekly television program on Channel 14 titled "She'elat Harav HaRashi" ("Ask the Chief Rabbi"), where he continues to respond to public halachic inquiries.

As President of the Rabbinical Supreme Court, he worked actively to reduce bureaucratic delays in divorce and family law cases that had dragged on for years, successfully bringing many to resolution. Among other reforms, he ordered the establishment of a dedicated family court in Eilat, regulated the status of overseas rabbinical courts in matters of divorce and conversion, and launched a specialized human-operated telephone hotline for such cases.

Rabbi Lau firmly opposed the Western Wall agreement ("Mekhav HaKotel") despite concerns over a potential rift with American Jewry. He also strongly objected to Minister Matan Kahana’s governmental conversion plan and kashrut reforms, and worked toward having both initiatives annulled.

During his tenure, he initiated reforms to the shemitta (sabbatical year) system, ensuring that for the first time, no Jewish farmers in Israel engaged in planting during the sabbatical year. He also led a comprehensive reform of the kosher slaughter system, establishing a committee overseeing imported meat to expand and supervise international slaughtering teams, thereby reducing importers’ reliance on a small number of individuals. Additionally, he streamlined the rabbinical examination system by outsourcing it to an external professional agency.

He devoted extensive hours to resolving complex cases of agunot (women whose husbands refuse to grant a divorce) and long-standing divorce disputes. On one occasion, he remained in deliberation for two consecutive nights until a divorce agreement was reached at dawn, after 48 hours of mediation.

During the COVID-19 pandemic, Rabbi Lau addressed significant halachic issues of public concern within the religious community. He issued regular and clear guidelines on matters of Jewish law during this period.

During the 2023–2024 Iron Swords War, Rabbi Lau established a special rabbinical court for war-related agunot. In June 2025, his book "Tears of Faith" was published by Kinneret Zmora-Bitan Dvir, recounting his activities and experiences during the war.

After concluding his term as Chief Rabbi of Israel, Rabbi Lau founded the Lau Center – "Lema'an Achai Verehi" (Psalms 122:8), an initiative dedicated to arbitration and mediation in financial and marital matters, Torah education and dissemination, rabbinic training, integration of Torah values into everyday life, and support for needy families, widows, and orphans.

== Published works ==
Lau has published articles in journals such as Tehumin, and edited a book of his father's responsa titled Yichil Yisrael. He also edited and published a book in memory of his grandfather, Yitzchak Yedidya Frankel. In 2008, he published his book Maskil LeDavid on issues of genealogy, conversion, military law, and other matters.

In 2025, he published a popular book titled Tears of Faith, which describes the journey of the Chief Rabbi during a time of war, resilience, and revival. The book chronicles his daily life from the day of the tragedy on October 7, 2023 (Simchat Torah), over the course of a year and a half.

== Controversies ==
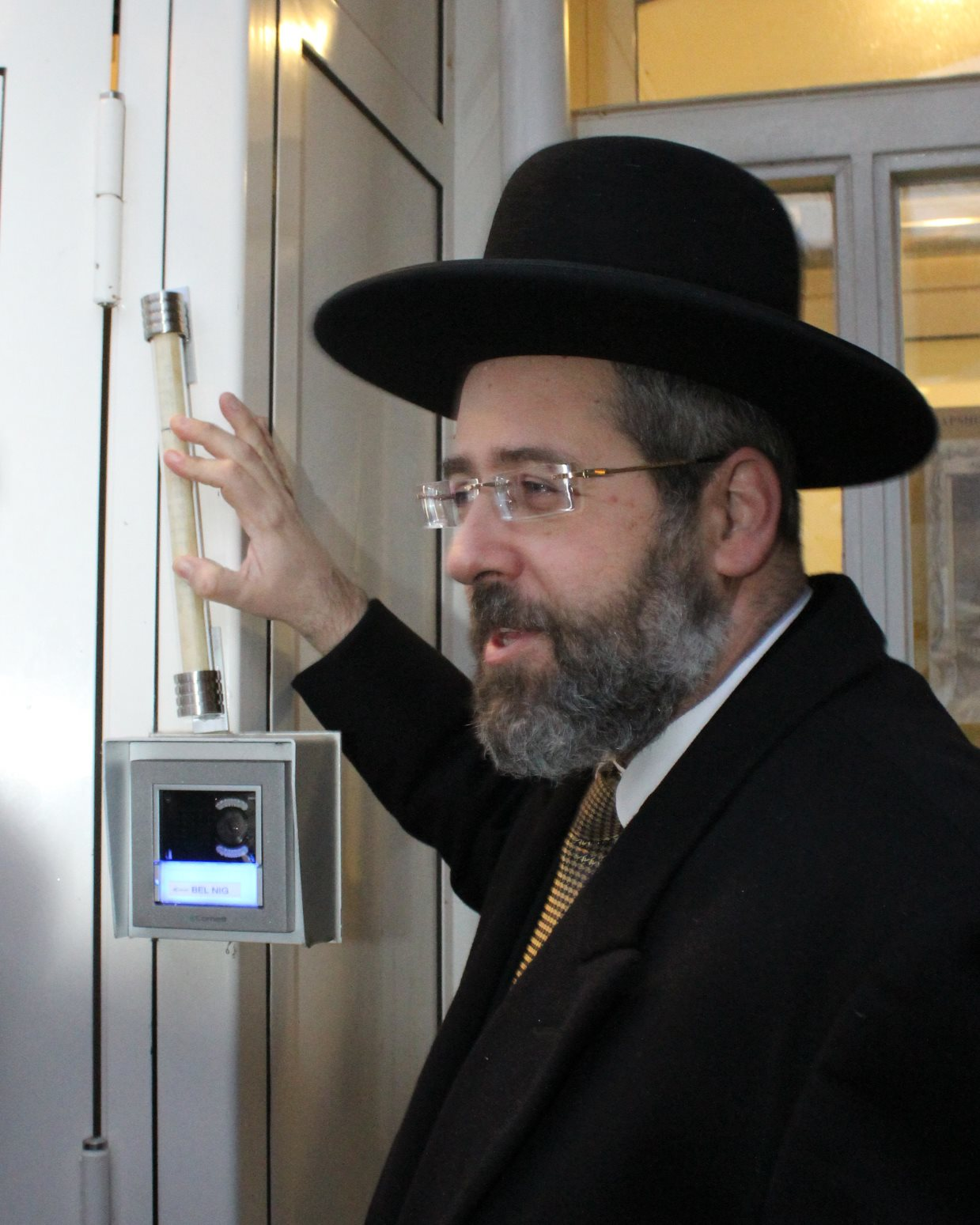
Lau affixing a mezuzah at the CHAJ centre in The Hague, 2016

Lau took a semikhah (rabbinic ordination) test in 1993. Dov Lior, the administering rabbi, asserted that Lau brought papers with answers to previous tests into the examination room. Lau denied the allegations, but he was disqualified. He was re-tested in 1994, and passed the exam.

In his first week in office as Chief Rabbi of Israel, Lau referred to African-Americans who play basketball on Israeli teams as kushim. Although in a Biblical context, it refers to the ancient Kingdom of Kush, it is currently considered a derogatory term for Black people. His comments were widely condemned as racist, and MK Amram Mitzna and Ethiopian-born MK Pnina Tamanu-Shata called upon him to apologize. Naftali Bennett, however, defended Lau.

In 2018, Lau was accused of trying to appoint his brother-in-law, Mordechai Ralbag, as a replacement for a rabbinical judge who was investigating corruption involving hekdeshot (Haredi non-profit property trusts). Lau and the Ralbag family denied any wrongdoing. Later that year, during the immediate aftermath of a shooting at a Conservative synagogue, Lau gave an interview to a Haredi newspaper during which he avoided calling the attack venue a synagogue, referring to it only as "a place with profound Jewish flavor". The omission was taken as a snub by Jews from non-Orthodox congregations.

In August 2019, Lau instructed the chevra kadisha to delay the burial in Jerusalem of the mother of an American Haredi man, Yisrael Meir Kin, until he agreed to give his wife a get (religious writ of divorce). Kin's relatives in Israel deposited $20,000 with the Supreme Rabbinical Court and signed a document pledging to do what they could to convince him. Kin accused Lau of corruption, and said that no one from Lau's office had contacted him. He said that the divorce papers had been filed ten years earlier at a religious court in Monsey, New York, and Lau, who was related to his wife, had taken sides in the case. A relative of Lau denied that he was related, but Haaretz determined that they are in fact related, though distantly. Lau's office responded to Kin's statements, saying that the chief rabbi was not aware of the family relation while dealing with the case, and that they were sorry that Kin, who had denied his wife a get "for more than 15 years", was "continuing his refusal despite the agreements reached ... [Lau] will continue his unwavering war on the phenomenon of get-refusal, and "will do everything he can, including [imposing] the most severe sanctions, to end any case of get-refusal that may develop". Officials in the Ministry of Religious Services said the chief rabbi has no jurisdiction over burial matters.

In December 2021, Lau was criticised for attending the shiva of prominent Haredi author Chaim Walder, who had committed suicide amidst allegations of being involved in sexual abuse against minors and married women. Natan Slifkin wrote in a blogpost:

By honoring the family with a visit while not making any statement about Walder, this lends support to the 'persecuted tzaddik (righteous one)' narrative. In addition, by not making any statement of support for the victims, it is a further slap in the face to them.

Lau subsequently issued a statement encouraging sexual assault victims to come forward and report the abuse to the proper authorities.

On December 17, 2023, in the midst of the Gaza war after the October 7 attacks, it was reported that two Palestinian women were killed by an IDF sniper in the courtyard of a Catholic church in Gaza. Pope Francis, responding to this incident, said "Some are saying, 'This is terrorism and war'. Yes, it is war. It is terrorism." Noting that Francis had previously pointed out to Israeli President Isaac Herzog during a meeting in November that it is "forbidden to respond to terror with terror", Lau wrote a letter to Francis protesting his use of the word "terror" to describe Israel's actions in Gaza, saying that it was a mischaracterisation.

== Personal life ==
Lau is married to Tziporah Ralbag. Her father, Yitzhak Ralbag, who served as a member of the Chief Rabbinate Council from 2008 to 2025, served as Acting Chief Rabbi of Israel following the conclusion of Lau's term until the much delayed 2024 Israeli chief rabbi elections. This was in accordance with the law stipulating that the eldest member of the Council assumes the role temporarily.

Lau resides in Jerusalem and has seven children, five of whom are married, and approximately fifteen grandchildren. His son-in-law, Yehuda Mann, serves as a rabbi in Toronto.

Jewish titles
Preceded by Yona Metzger	Ashkenazi Chief Rabbi of Israel; 2013–2024	Succeeded by Kalman Bar
