= CHAJ =

Dutch non-profit organization

Centrum voor Haagse Jiddisjkeit ‘CHAJ’
- Founded: 2015
- Founded at: The Hague, Netherlands
- Purpose: Promote Jewish culture, identity and heritage in the Netherlands and The Hague, Israel-related programming, and Jewish education
- Headquarters: The Hague, Netherlands
- Region served: North of Europe
- Rabbi: Shmuel Katzman
- Parent organization: Nederlands Israëlitische Gemeente Den Haag
- Website: www.chajdenhaag.nl

The Centre for Yiddishkeit in The Hague (Dutch: Centrum voor Haagse Jiddisjkeit; CHAJ) is a non-profit organization promoting Jewish culture, identity, education and heritage in the Netherlands and The Hague. CHAJ has Israel-related programming. CHAJ also functions as a Jewish community centre for the Jewish community of The Hague.

== Activities ==
Chaj also holds Jewish related exhibitions, the first exhibition presents 300 years of Jewish history of The Hague and was open during the yearly Hanukkah celebration.

On January 14, 2016, the Ashkenazi Chief Rabbi of Israel, David Lau, placed a mezuzah at the centre, marking the official opening of CHAJ.

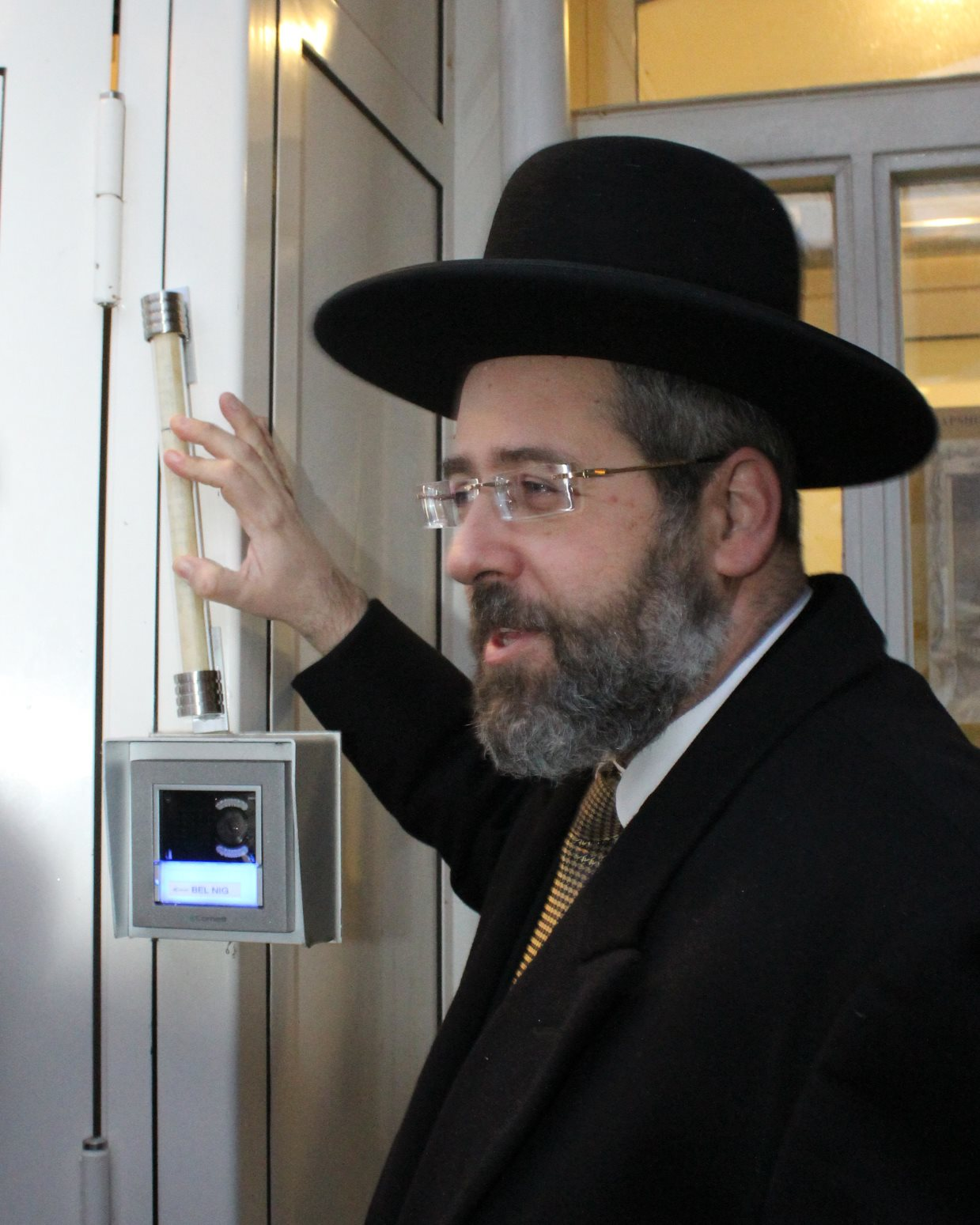
Rabbi David Lau at the CHAJ centre in The Hague.
