= Nederlands Israëlitische Gemeente Den Haag =

Ashkenazi Orthodox Jewish community in The Hague, Netherlands

Nederlands Israëlitische Gemeente Den Haag (NIG Den Haag)
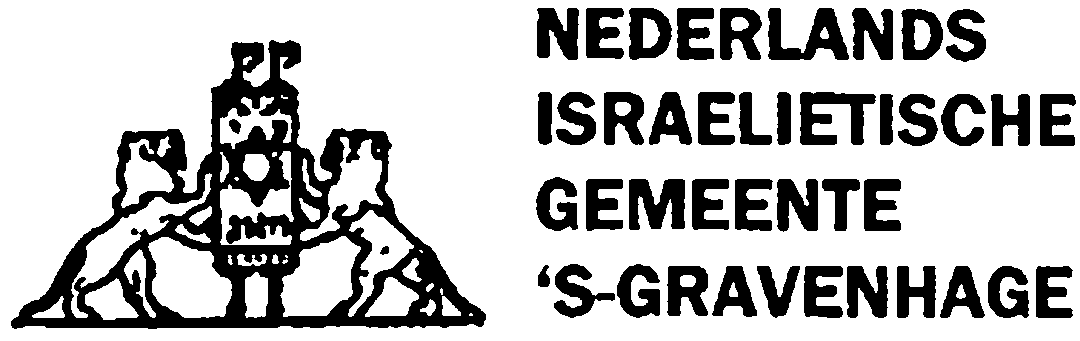
- NIG Den Haag logo
- Founded: 1700
- Founded at: The Hague, Netherlands
- Purpose: Ashkenazi Orthodox Jewish community in The Hague.
- Headquarters: The Hague, Netherlands
- Region served: South Holland
- Rabbi: Shmuel Katzman
- Parent organization: Nederlands Israëlitisch Kerkgenootschap
- Website: joodsdenhaag.nl (in Dutch)

The Dutch Israelite Religious Community of The Hague (Dutch: Nederlands Israëlitische Gemeente Den Haag; NIG Den Haag) is the Ashkenazi Orthodox Jewish community in The Hague and is a member of the Nederlands-Israëlitisch Kerkgenootschap (English: Dutch Israelite Religious Community) (NIK).

The congregation holds regular Shabbat activities as well as Jewish festivals year-round. There are educational activities for all age groups and cultural meetings at the CHAJ centre. The leader of the congregation is rabbi Shmuel Katzman.

== Synagogues ==
NIG Bezuidenhout
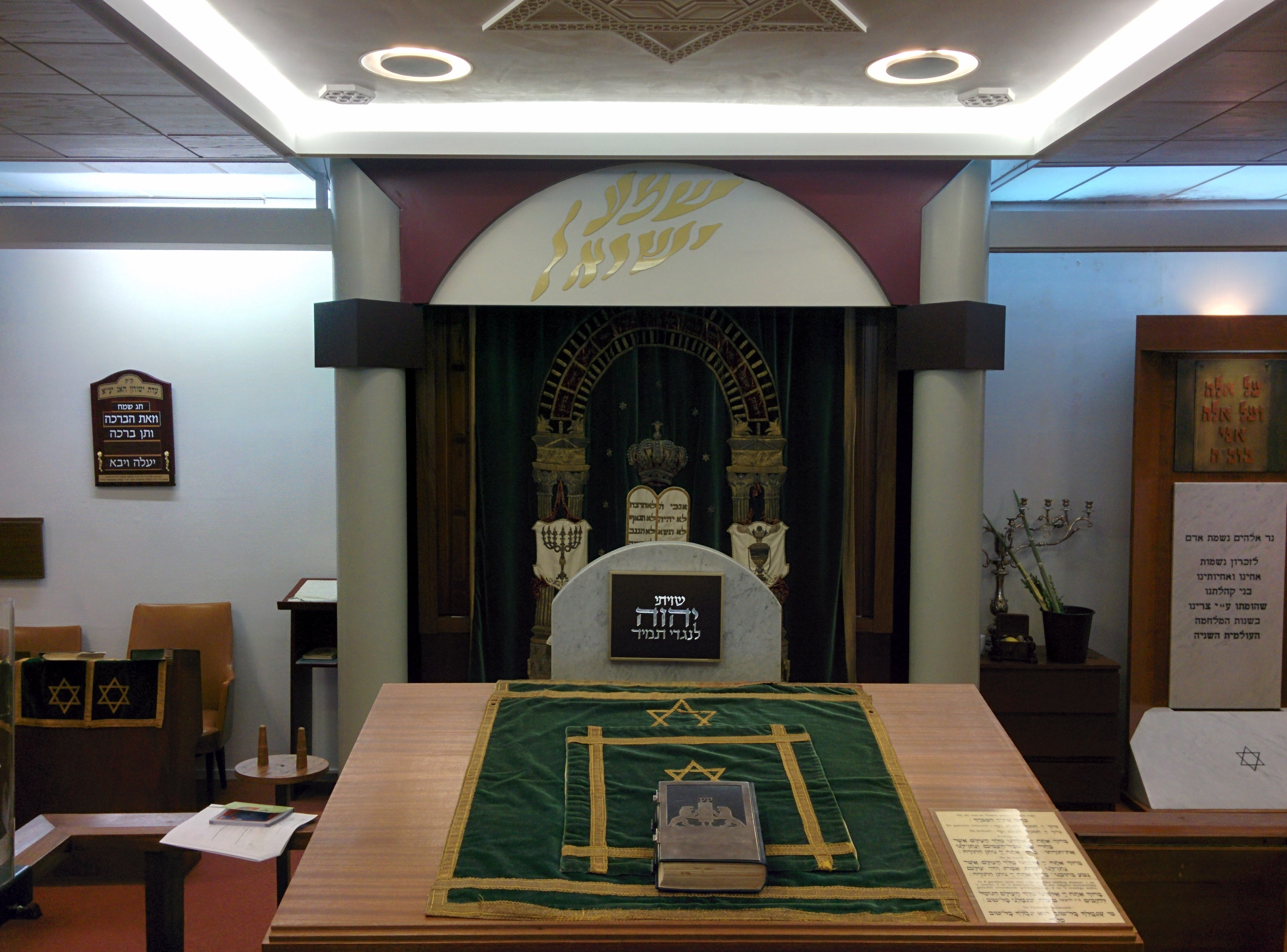
- The synagogue interior, in 2015

Religion
- Affiliation: Orthodox Judaism
- Rite: Nusach Ashkenaz
- Ecclesiastical or organizational status: Synagogue
- Ownership: Dutch Israelite Community (NIG)
- Leadership: Rabbi Shmuel Katzman
- Status: Active

Location
- Location: Cornelis Houtmanstraat 11, Bezuidenhout, The Hague, South Holland
- Country: The Netherlands
- Interactive map of NIG Bezuidenhout
- Coordinates: 52°05′23″N 4°20′26″E

Architecture
- Completed: 1986

The NIG Bezuidenhout Synagogue, or Adas Jessurun Synagogue, is located behind an inconspicuous entrance at Cornelis Houtmanstraat 11 in Bezuidenhout. Established in 1986, the synagogue's name is loosely translated as the Community of Israel. The synagogue was designed by the Van Veldhoven Partners Architectenbureau in The Hague. The foundation stone was laid on 5 June 1986 and the synagogue was officially inaugurated on 30 September 1986, in the presence of Queen Beatrix. A number of objects in the synagogue, including the old Torah scrolls, originate from an eighteenth-century synagogue on the Voldersgracht.

NIG Scheveningen
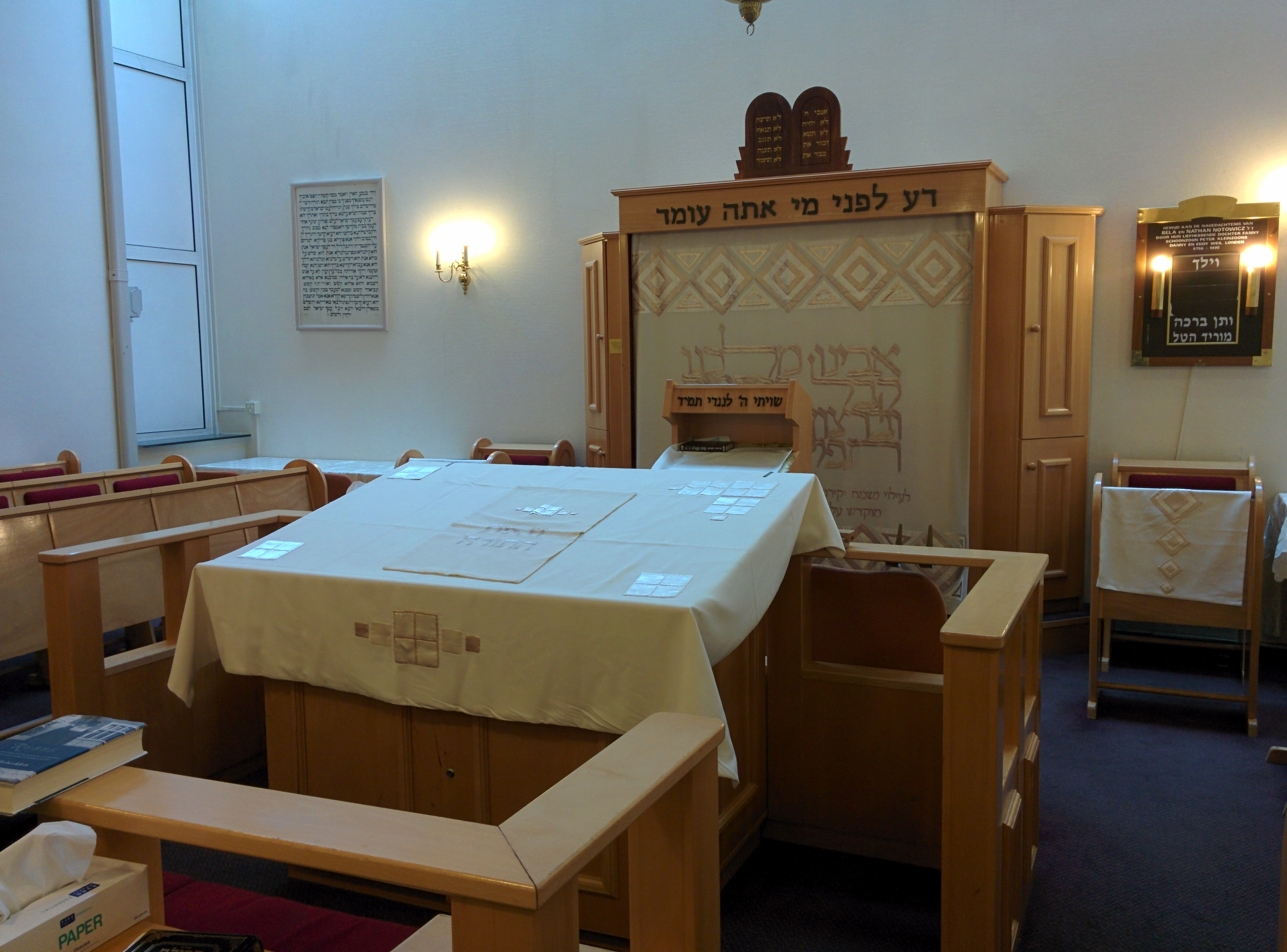
- The synagogue interior, in 2015

Religion
- Affiliation: Orthodox Judaism
- Rite: Nusach Ashkenaz
- Ecclesiastical or organizational status: Synagogue
- Ownership: Dutch Israelite Community (NIG)
- Leadership: Rabbi Shmuel Katzman
- Status: Active

Location
- Location: Doorniksestraat 152, Scheveningen, The Hague, South Holland
- Country: The Netherlands
- Interactive map of NIG Scheveningen
- Coordinates: 52°06′27″N 4°18′04″E

Architecture
- Established: 2010

The NIG Scheveningen Synagogue is located at Doorniksestraat 152 in Scheveningen. Occupied from 2010, when the Beis Jisroeil (House of Israel) synagogue was abandoned, the complex contains a mikveh, a community centre called CHAJ, educational facilities and a library.

== Other facilities ==
In The Hague there are also three Jewish cemeteries.

== Notable members ==
- Rabbi Shaul Hager Halevi, an influential 18th-century rabbi who was known even in the Far East.

== Gallery ==
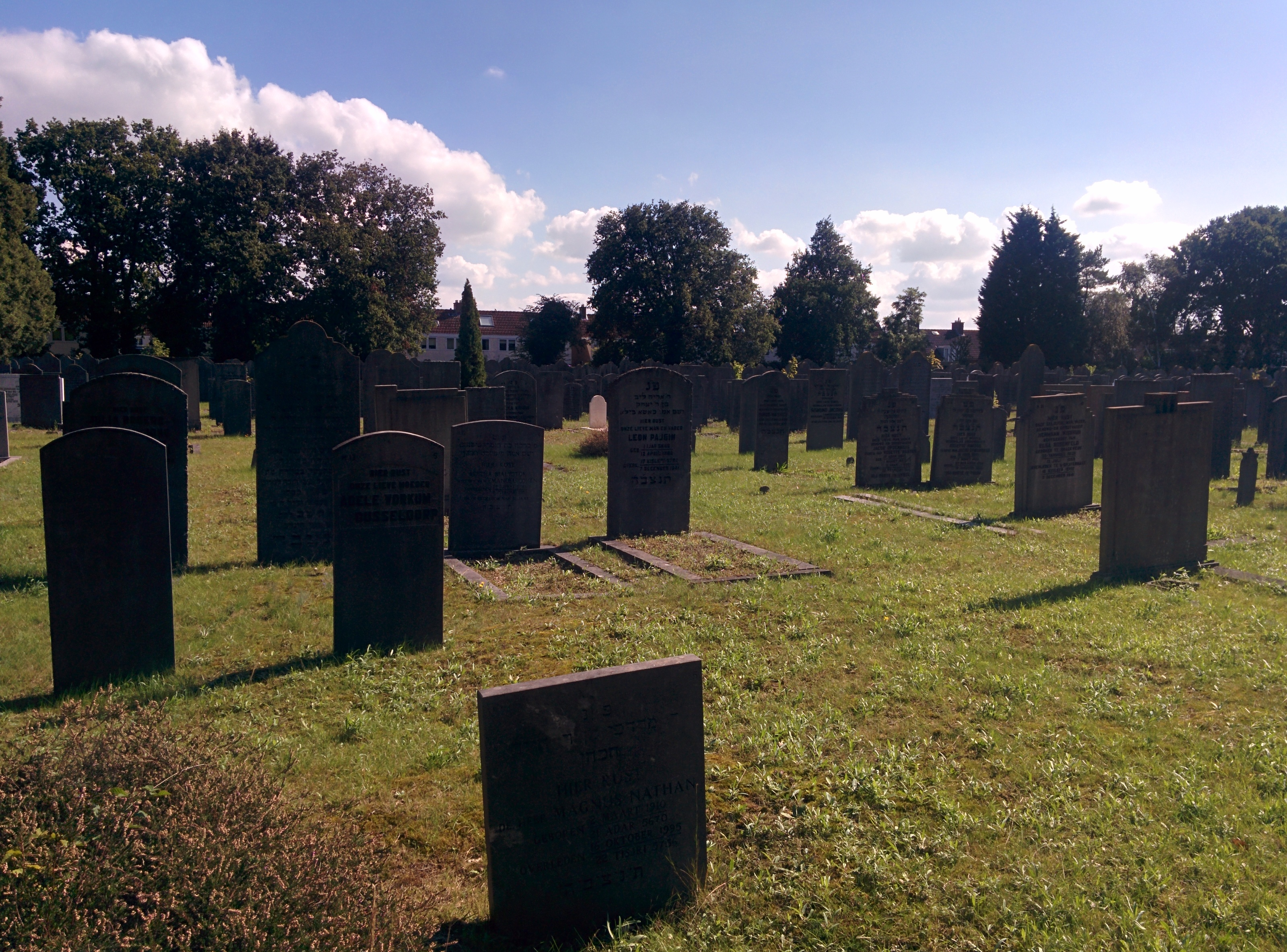
Jewish Cemetery in Wassenaar

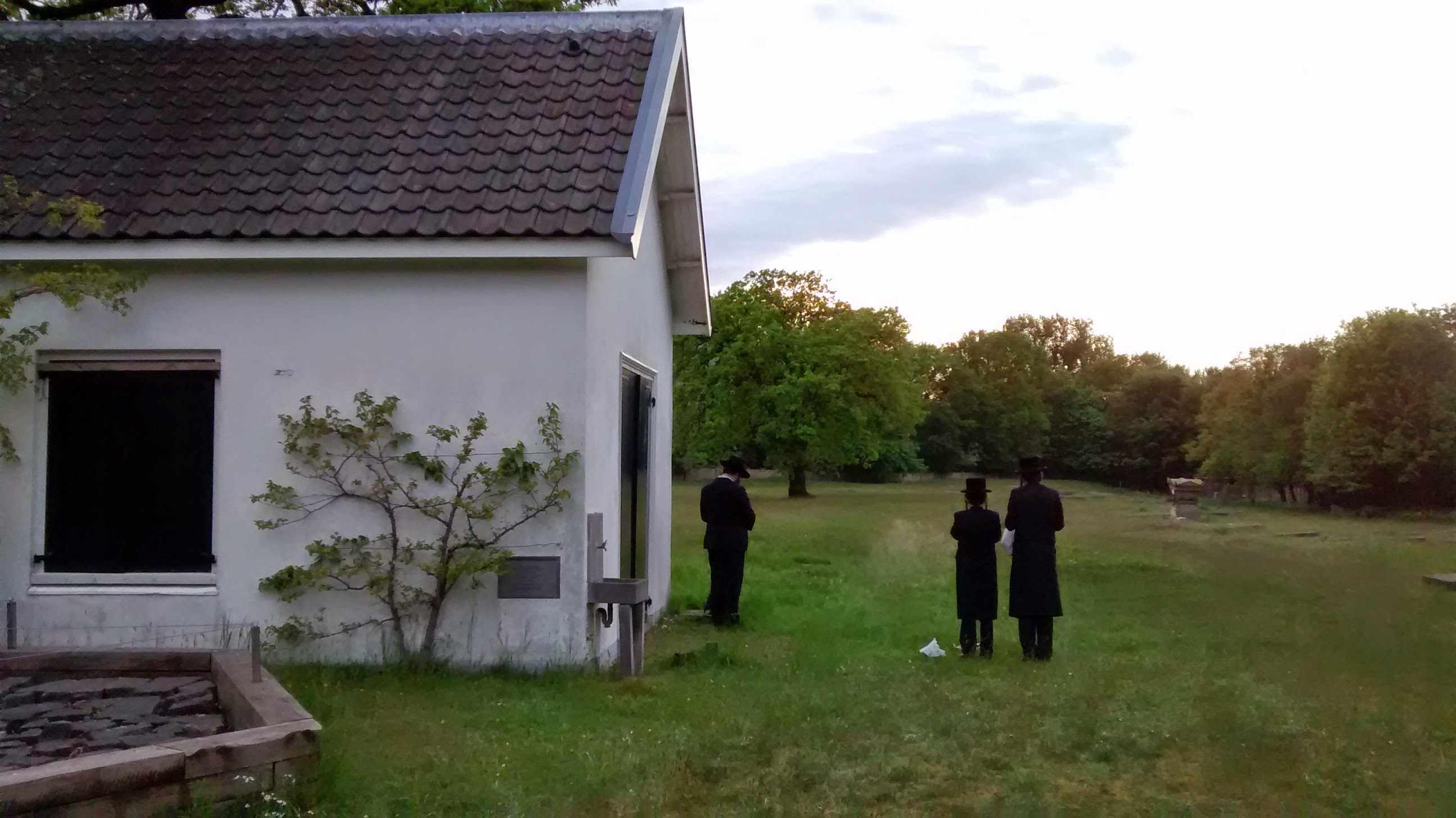
Jewish Cemetery in Scheveningen

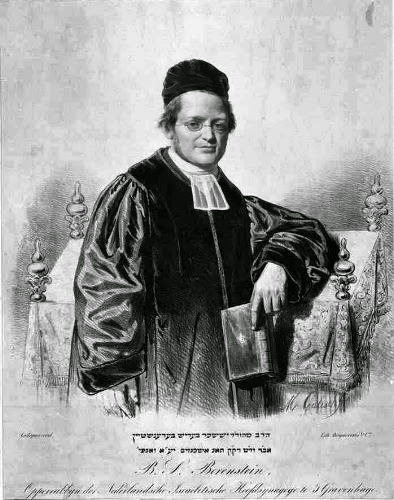
Harav Berisch Bernstein

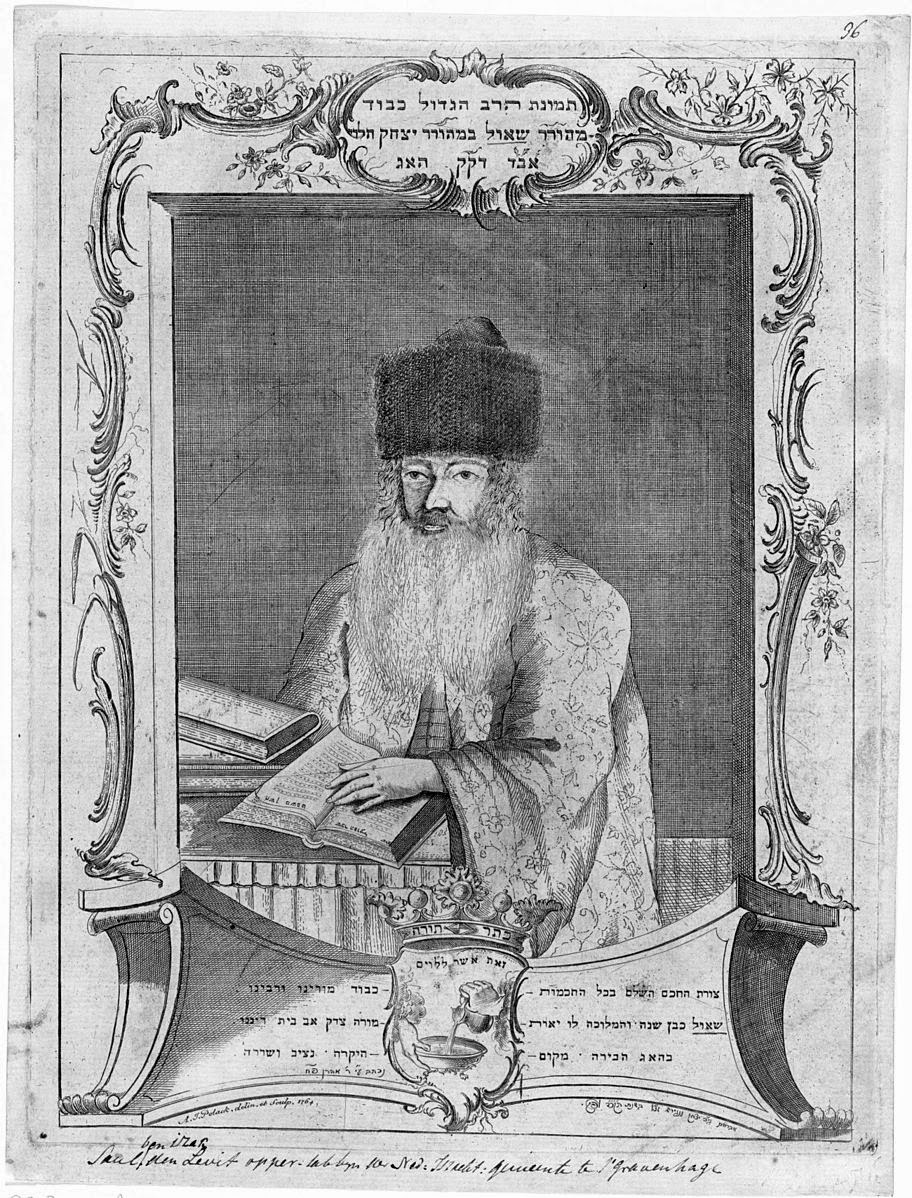
Sha’oel halevi Hager

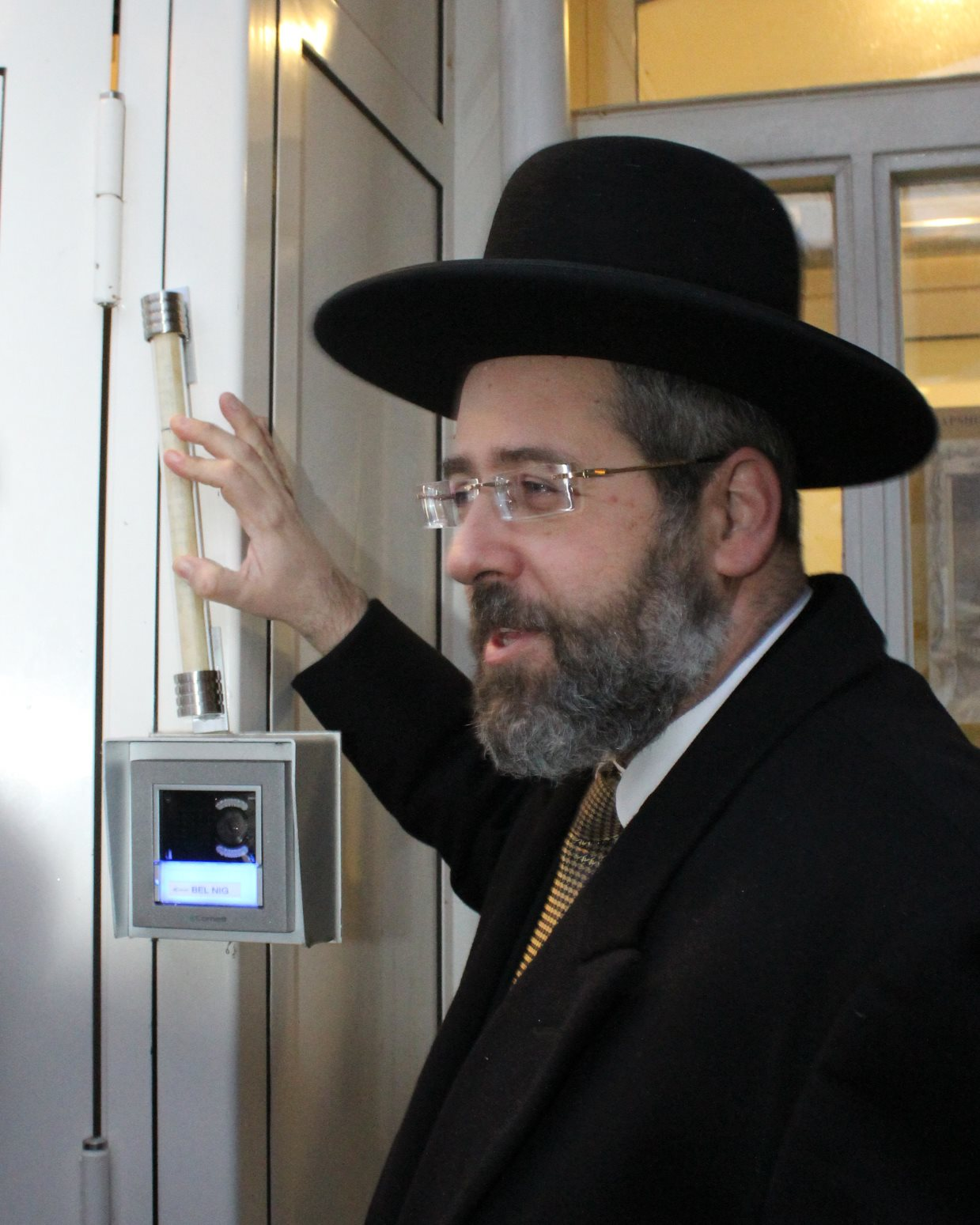
Rabbi David Lau the Ashkenazi Chief Rabbi of Israel, at the CHAJ centre in The Hague.

== See also ==
- History of the Jews in the Netherlands
- List of synagogues in the Netherlands
- Nederlands Israëlitisch Kerkgenootschap
- Jewish Amsterdam
- List of Dutch Jews
- Nieuw Israëlitisch Weekblad
- Portugees-Israëlitisch Kerkgenootschap
- Sephardic Jews in the Netherlands
