= Simcha Kook =

Rabbi Simcha Kook
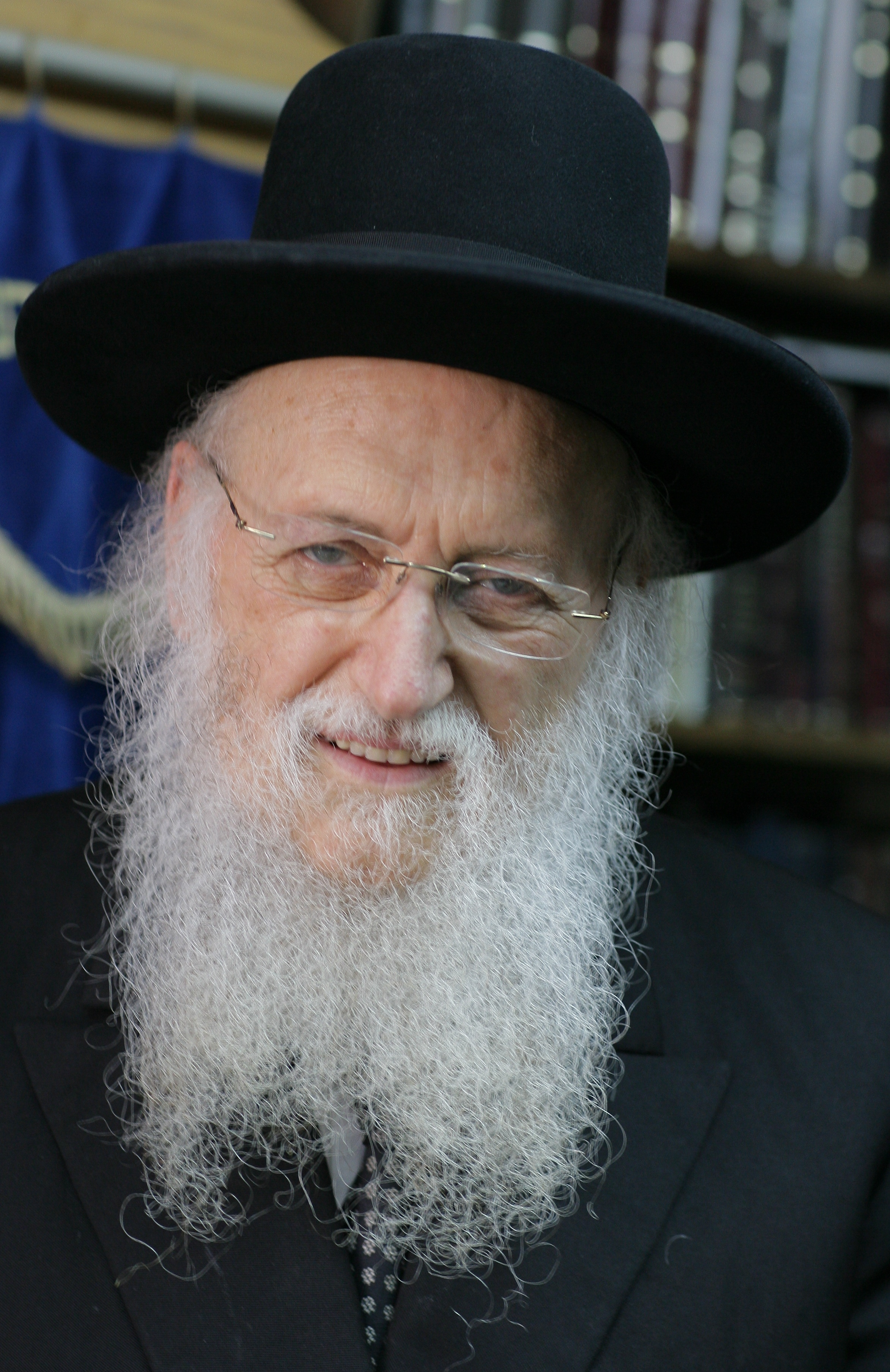

Personal life
- Born: August 11, 1930
- Died: May 24, 2022 (aged 91)

Religious life
- Religion: Judaism
- Position: Chief Rabbi of Rehovot

Rabbi Simcha HaKohen Kook (August 11, 1930 – May 24, 2022) was the Rabbi and Av Beit Din of Rehovot, and the rabbi of the restored Hurva Synagogue in the Jewish Quarter of the Old City of Jerusalem.

== Biography ==
He was born at Beit Mendelbaum in Jerusalem in the year 1930), to Rabbi Raphael Kook, the nephew and disciple of Rabbi Abraham Isaac HaKohen Kook, and to Rachel, the daughter of Rabbi Simcha Mendelbaum. He was named after his maternal grandfather, who had passed away a few months earlier.

He studied at the Bnei Akiva Yeshiva of Kfar HaRoeh and at the Hebron Yeshiva in Jerusalem, as well as six months at the Slobodka Yeshiva under Rabbi Isak Sher. After his marriage, he studied at the kollel of the Harry Fischel Institute in the Beit Vagan neighborhood of Jerusalem. During the War of Independence, he served on the Jerusalem front as a squad commander. In the early 1960s, he was a lecturer and educational director at the Merom Zion Yeshiva in Kiryat Noar. His educational goal was "to cultivate here, first and foremost, Jews — young men with deep roots in Jewish tradition and Jewish law, who would at the same time be productive citizens with education and a profession. The emphasis is placed, of course, on Judaism, on directing graduates toward the various yeshivas.

In the mid-1960s, encouraged by Rabbi Moshe Tzvi Neria, head of the Bnei Akiva yeshiva network, he opened the Bnei Akiva Yeshiva of Netanya a yeshiva high school belonging to the Bnei Akiva network. As rosh yeshiva, he insisted on giving priority to Torah study over secular work, and saw Torah learning as the solution to the problems of youth. At the same time, he promoted excellence in the yeshiva in secular subjects as well.

In the autumn of 1969, Rabbi Kook was placed at the head of a united list of Agudat Yisrael and a faction of the National Religious Party (Mafdal) for the Netanya City Council, which won two seats.

Following the passing of his father, Rabbi Raphael Kook, he ran in the elections for the rabbinate of the city of Tiberias, with the aim of filling his father's seat. To enable his candidacy, the Council of the Chief Rabbinate granted him certification as a city rabbi and rabbinical judge qualification without examinations. However, at the end of August 1971, after the High Court of Justice issued a conditional order freezing the elections pending a review of the petitioners' claims, Rabbi Kook announced that he was withdrawing his candidacy, as he had no wish to be elected in a place of controversy. The petitioners were representatives of the ultra-Orthodox community in the city, who viewed him as a rabbi identified with the National Religious Party.

During Hanukkah of 5732, his eldest brother, Rabbi Shlomo Kook, the rabbi of Rehovot, was killed in a road accident along with his wife and two of his sons. In the wake of this tragedy, Rabbi Kook was called upon to fill his brother's place as rabbi of Rehovot, a position he held until his passing on the 23rd of Iyar, 5782. In Kislev 1973, he was appointed by the Council of the Chief Rabbinate to serve as a rabbinical judge and Av Beit Din (President of the Rabbinical Court) in his city.

At his funeral, which departed from the Shamgar funeral home in Jerusalem and concluded in Rehovot, thousands of people participated along with many rabbis, including the Chief Rabbis of Israel and rabbis from both the Lithuanian ultra-Orthodox community and the Religious Zionist community.

=== In the Rabbinate of Rehovot ===
As the city rabbi of Rehovot, he was also responsible for the municipal kashrut system, and introduced within it, in addition to regular kashrut supervision, a mehadrin kashrut system headed by Rabbi Avraham Rubin. Due to legal restrictions preventing a rabbi of one city from granting certification on behalf of another city's rabbinate, this system, which also operates in additional locations throughout Israel, became a private kashrut body known as "Beit Din Tzedek Mehadrin." This certification is accepted by large segments of the ultra-Orthodox community. At the end of 2008, Rabbi Kook severed his connection with this kashrut body.

=== Rabbinical Positions ===
In 1993, he was one of three candidates for the position of Ashkenazi Chief Rabbi of Israel (alongside Rabbi Sha'ar Yashuv HaKohen and Rabbi Yisrael Meir Lau), but lost the contest to Rabbi Lau.

In February 2007, he was crowned as the rabbi of the Hurva Synagogue in Jerusalem. Following the synagogue's reopening in 2010, the appointment took effect.

Rabbi Kook was a member of the Council of the Chief Rabbinate of Israel for 25 years, until 2008.

Rabbi Kook served as head or president of several institutions, among them the Meor HaTalmud Yeshiva in Rehovot, the 'Alei Be'er' seminary in Jerusalem, the Chochmat Shlomo Yeshiva for young men in Rehovot (headed by his son-in-law), the Torat Raphael Yeshiva in Jerusalem (headed by his son, Rabbi Chaim), as well as a number of smaller yeshivas, girls' seminaries, and children's Talmud Torah schools.

In 5776, the first part of his book "Shalmei Simcha" was published — a collection of sermons for Shabbat HaGadol (the Great Sabbath preceding Passover).

== Positions ==
Rabbi Kook was known as a rabbi with hawkish positions in the debate over land for peace. He was among the founders of the Atara LeYoshna association, which promoted Jewish settlement in the Muslim Quarter of the Old City of Jerusalem, and in the 1990s he had a weekly slot on the radio of Arutz Sheva.

== His Family ==
His brothers were: Rabbi Shlomo Kook, Rabbi Abraham Isaac Kook, and Rabbi Nachum Kook. His sisters were: Rabbanit Sara Katz (wife of Rabbi Yaakov Katz) and Rabbanit Leah Sherman (wife of Rabbi Avraham Sherman).

He was married to Nechama, née Kabalkin, and was the father of nine children, among them:

- Rabbi Chaim, head of the Torat Raphael Yeshiva in Jerusalem
- His son-in-law, Rabbi Yeshaya HaLevi Shifman, head of the 'She'erit Yaakov' Yeshiva in Har Nof and head of the 'Even Tzion' kollel in Ramat Shlomo, Jerusalem
- Dov, director of the Chemdат HaTorah Talmud Torah in Ramat Shlomo
- Rabbi Ben-Zion, director of the 'Alei Be'er' seminary in Jerusalem
- Avraham-Yitzchak (Ami), CEO of the 'Generation' organization for deepening Jewish identity
- Rabbi Aryeh, lecturer at the Meor HaTalmud Yeshiva
- Rabbi Emanuel Kook, director of the Torat Raphael Yeshiva.
- His son-in-law, Rabbi Yaakov Lazarovitz, head of the 'Chochmat Shlomo' Yeshiva in Rehovot
- Rabbi Raphael Kook
