= Kol Chai =

- Israel
- Frequencies: 93.0 MHz (Gush Dan/Center); 92.8 MHz (Jerusalem)

Programming
- Language: Hebrew
- Format: Talk; religious; music; news
- Affiliations: Orthodox Judaism

Ownership
- Sister stations: Kol Chai Music

History
- First air date: 1996

Technical information
- Licensing authority: The Second Authority for Television and Radio

Links
- Webcast: Live stream
- Website: www.emess.co.il

Kol Chai (Hebrew: קול חי) is a Haredi and National Religious radio station in Israel established in 1996. The station, based in Bnei Brak, broadcasts six days a week, though not on Shabbat.

== Contributors ==
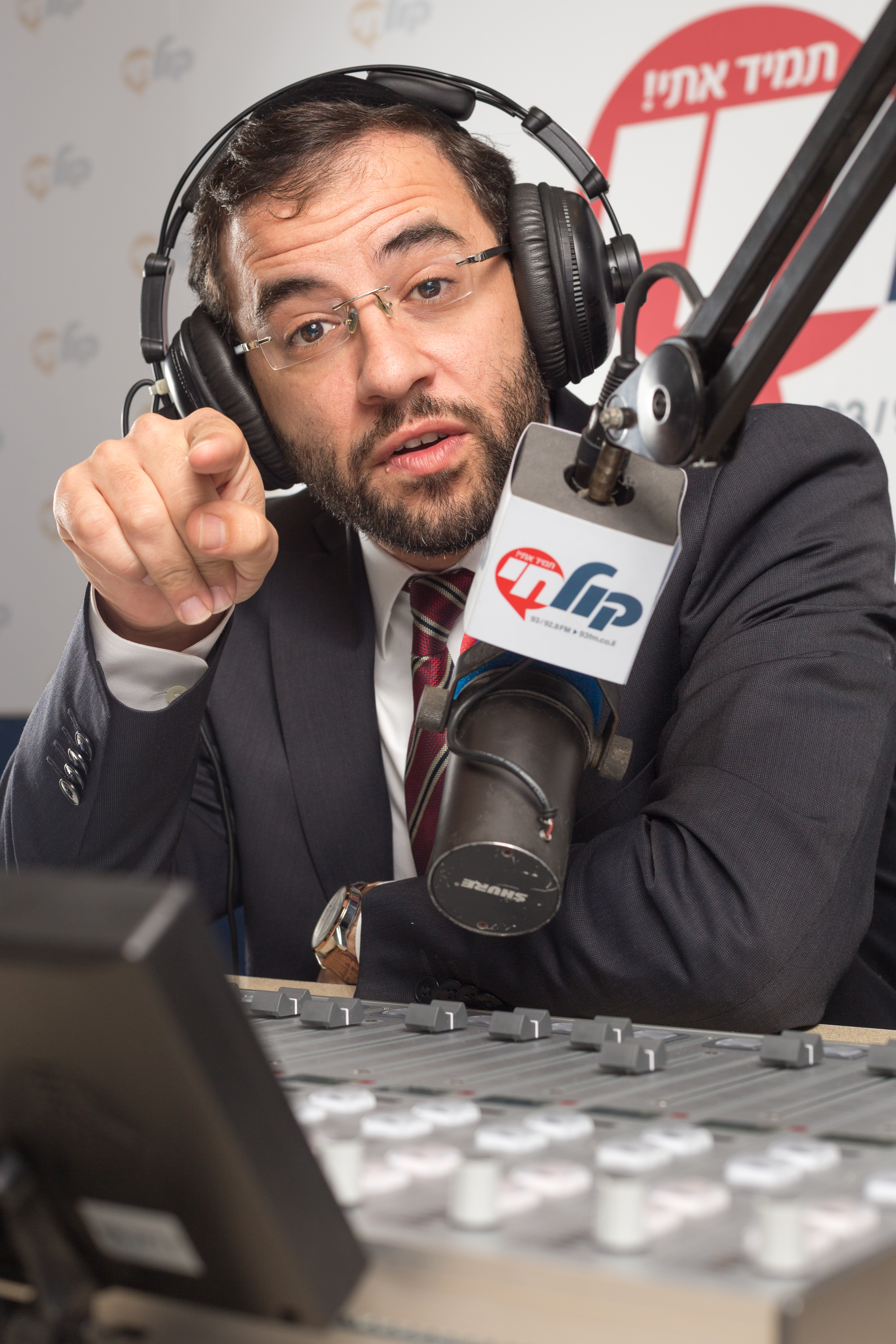
Kol Chai host Avi Mimran

Current

- David Lau
- Mordechai Lavi
- Avraham Yosef

Former

- Chaim Walder

== See also ==
- List of radio stations in Israel
- Media of Israel
