= Kikar HaShabbat (website) =

Israeli news website

Kikar HaShabbat כיכר השבת
- Website type: News website
- Available in: Hebrew
- Owner: Mordechai Lavi
- Editor: Chaim Illouz
- Website: www.kikar.co.il
- Registration: Optional
- Launched: May 2009; 17 years ago
- Current status: Online

Kikar HaShabbat (Hebrew: כיכר השבת, lit. 'Sabbath Square') is a Hebrew–language Israeli news website directed toward Haredi audience. It is named after an intersection in Jerusalem in a neighbourhood inhabited by Haredi Jews. A Globes study in 2017 found it as Israel's 9th most used news website.

== History ==
Kikar HaShabbat was started in 2009 by journalist Mordechai Lavi. In 2012, Israeli website Yedioth Ahronoth acquired half of Kikar HaShabbat.

== See also ==
- Media of Israel
