= History of the Jews in Amsterdam =

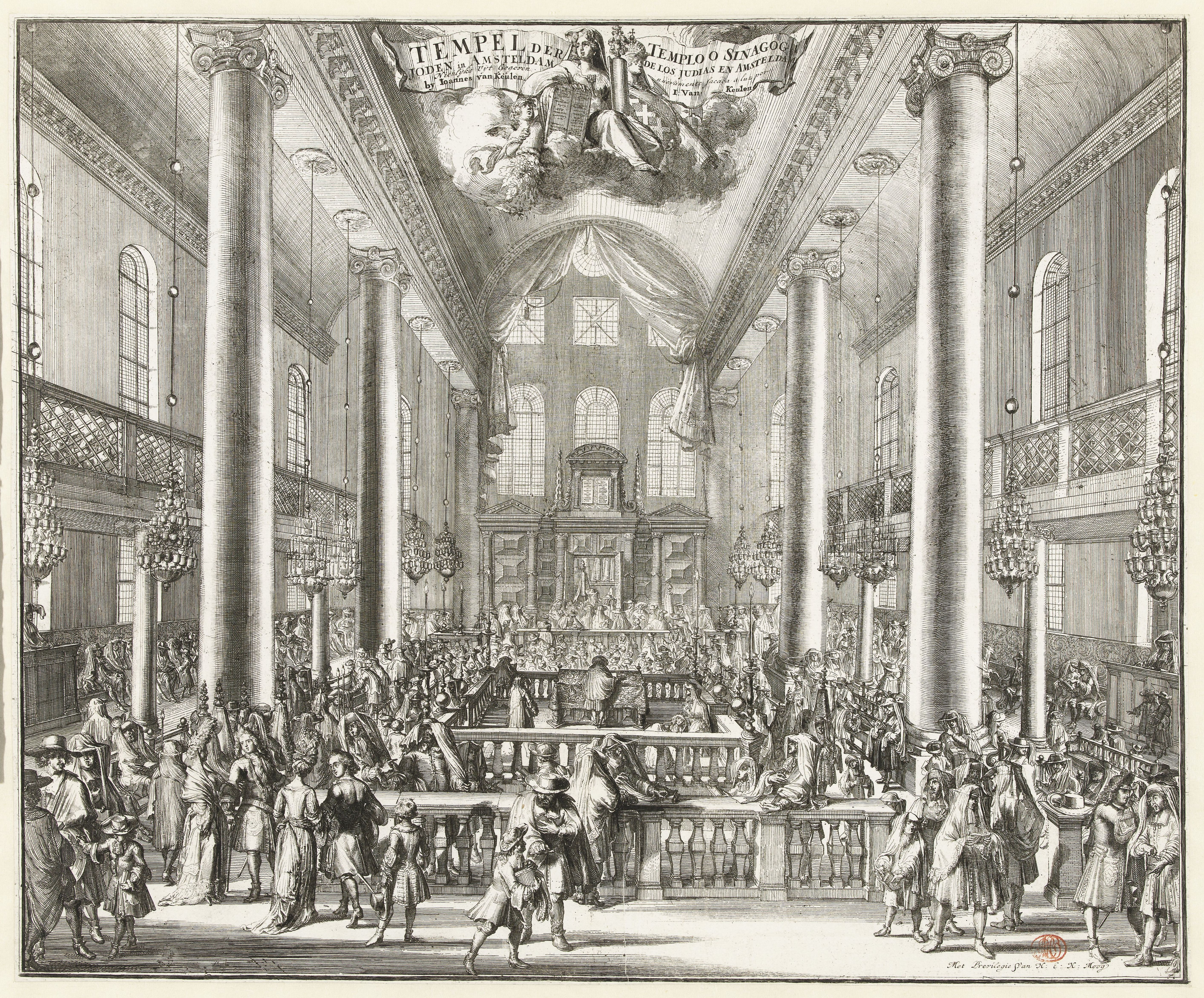
Interior of the Portuguese Synagogue, modeled after the Temple of Solomon in Jerusalem, Amsterdam 1695 by Romeyn de Hooghe

The history of the Jews in Amsterdam focuses on the historical center of the Dutch Jewish community, comprising both Portuguese Jews originally from both Spain and Portugal and Ashkenazi Jews, originally from central Europe. The two separate groups have had a continuing presence since the seventeenth century. Amsterdam has been called a Jerusalem of the West and the "Dutch Jerusalem". The Holocaust in the Netherlands devastated the Jewish community, with the Nazis murdering over 80% of Amsterdam's 79,000 Jews, but the community has managed to rebuild a vibrant and living Jewish life for its approximately 15,000 present members.

== Conversos and Portuguese Jews ==
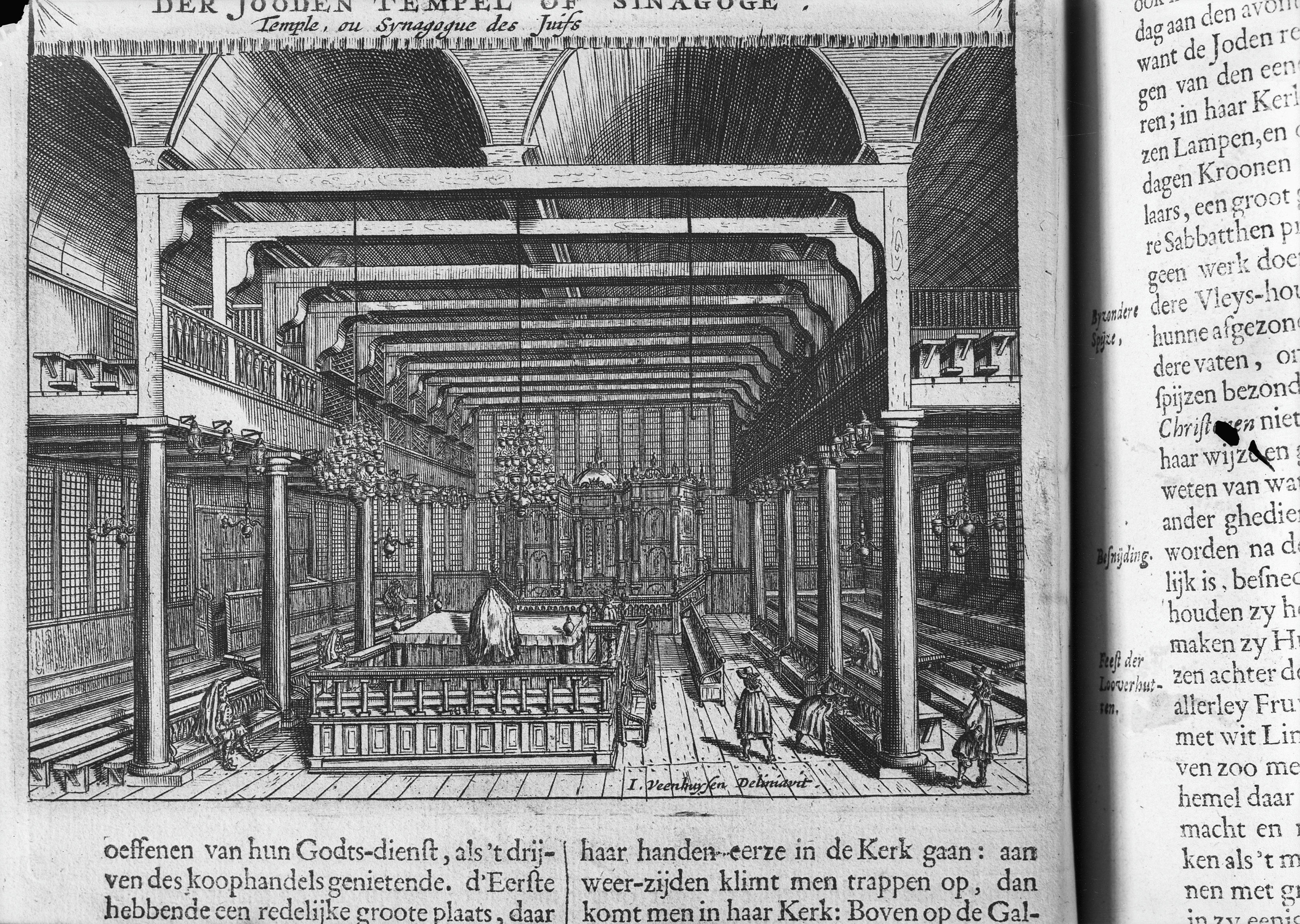
Drawing of the interior of the Talmud Tora at Houtgracht (1639), demolished in 1931

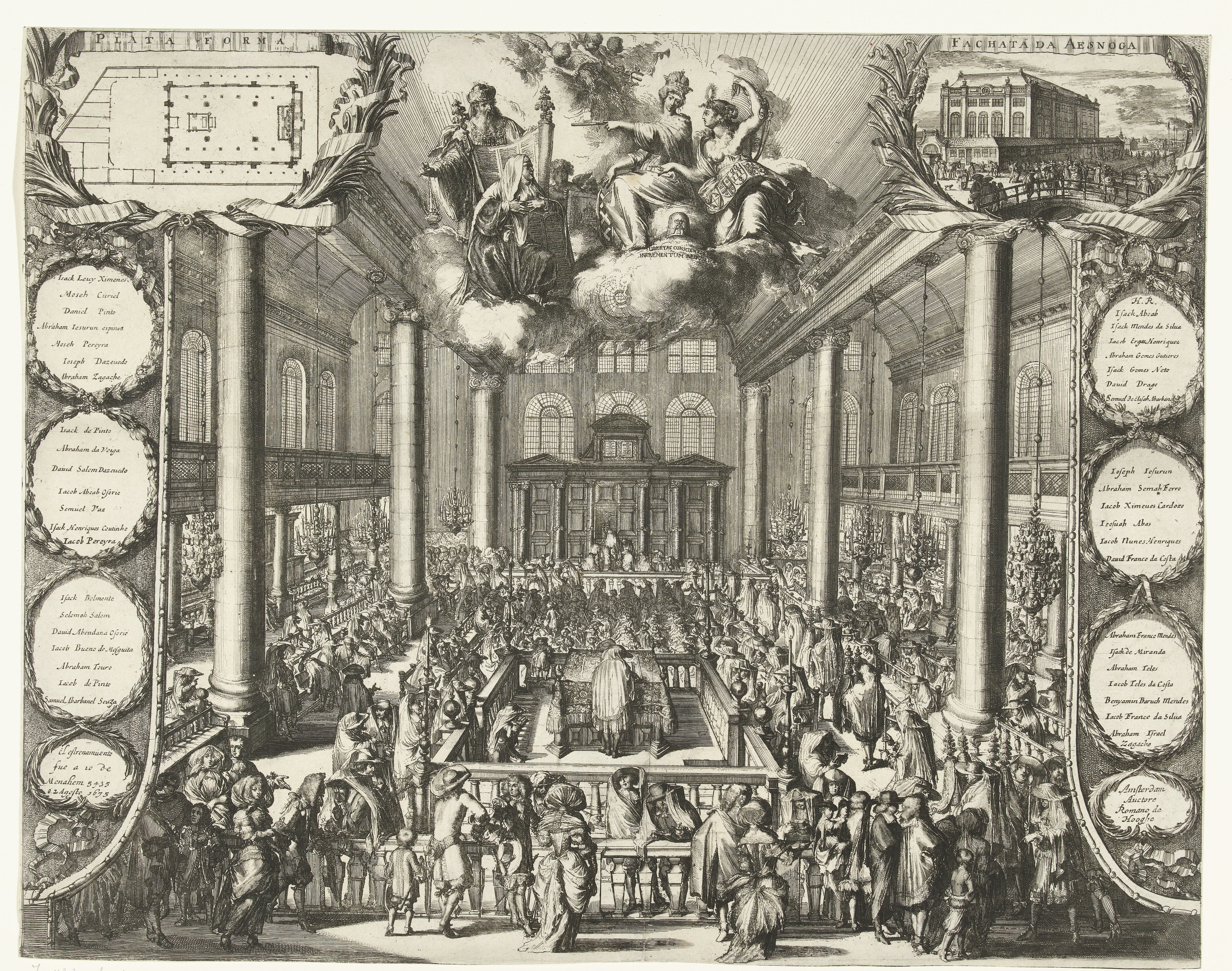
Esnoga in 1675

At the end of the sixteenth century and beginning of the seventeenth, Portuguese Jews began settling in Amsterdam. They self identified not as Sephardic Jews or Sephardim, but rather "Jews of the Hebrew Nation". Conversos, Jews forcibly or otherwise converted to Christianity, arrived from Spain and Portugal. Some were sincere Christian converts who now wished to embrace the religion of their ancestors while other were crypto-Jews, Jews outwardly Christian but who continued practicing Judaism privately. With the creation of the Spanish Inquisition in 1478 to monitor Jewish converts to Christianity and the 1492 Alhambra Decree, mandating conversion to Christianity or expulsion for Spanish Jews, many migrated to the Kingdom of Portugal. In 1497, the Portuguese monarch forced the conversion of Jews to Christianity, but also prohibited their leaving the kingdom. However, the Inquisition there was not established until 1536. After 1536, Portuguese New Christians, used to de facto permission to practice Judaism privately so long as they were outwardly Christian, now came under scrutiny. Restrictions on their leaving Portugal were eased and some sought economic opportunities in Antwerp and in Amsterdam in the northern Spanish Netherlands, which had revolted against Habsburg rule. The newly independent Dutch provinces provided an ideal opportunity for these Portuguese New Christians, many of whom had been practicing Judaism privately, to establish themselves as a community in an increasingly thriving economy and to practice Judaism more openly.

Collectively, they brought economic growth and influence to the city as they established an international trading hub in Amsterdam during the 17th century, the so-called Dutch Golden Age. Perhaps the most notable example of Sephardic Jews in Amsterdam are the Curiel family, namely Jeromino Nunes da Costa (alias Moses Curiel), son of Jacob Curiel. Curiel was the single largest financial contributor to the building of the Portuguese Synagogue in Amsterdam.

In 1593, Marrano Jews arrived in Amsterdam after having been refused admission to Middelburg and Haarlem. These Converso were important merchants, and men of great ability. Their expertise contributed materially to the prosperity of the Netherlands. They became strenuous supporters of the contender House of Orange and were in return protected by the Stadholder. At this time, commerce in Holland was increasing; a period of development had arrived, particularly for Amsterdam, to which Jews had carried their goods and from which they maintained their relations with foreign lands. Quite new for the Netherlands, they also held connections with the Levant, Morocco and the Caribbean Antilles.

The formal independence from Spain of the Dutch Republic, by the Act of Abjuration, theoretically permitted their openly practice of Judaism. In 1602 Moses Uri HaLevi arrived in the city. In 1614 the change came through a diktat from the States of Holland. Soon many Jews settled at Vlooienburg. There were three struggling congregations which merged to Talmud Torah, a united Sephardic congregation when in 1638 a reconciliation was achieved. One synagogue was sold, one remained in existence and the third continued to be used as a schoolroom. Spinoza's father was a parnassim and the school was located in the adjacent house at Houtgracht.

A bilingual Hebrew–Spanish prayer collection printed in Amsterdam in 1687 for Iberian Jewish refugees included blessings for the year, a perpetual liturgical calendar, a Haggadah, prayers for the sick and for martyrs of the Inquisition, and the formula for counting the Omer.

== Ashkenazim ==
The first Ashkenazim, Jews from Central and Eastern Europe, who arrived in Amsterdam were refugees from the Chmielnicki Uprising in Poland and the Thirty Years War. Their numbers soon swelled, eventually outnumbering the Sephardic Jews at the end of the 17th century; by 1674, some 5,000 Ashkenazi Jews were living in Amsterdam, while 2,500 Sephardic Jews called Amsterdam their home. Many of the new Ashkenazi immigrants were poor, contrary to their relatively wealthy Sephardic co-religionists. They were only allowed in Amsterdam because of the financial aid promised to them and other guarantees given to the Amsterdam city council by the Sephardic community, despite the religious and cultural differences between the Yiddish-speaking Ashkenazim and the Portuguese-speaking Sephardim.

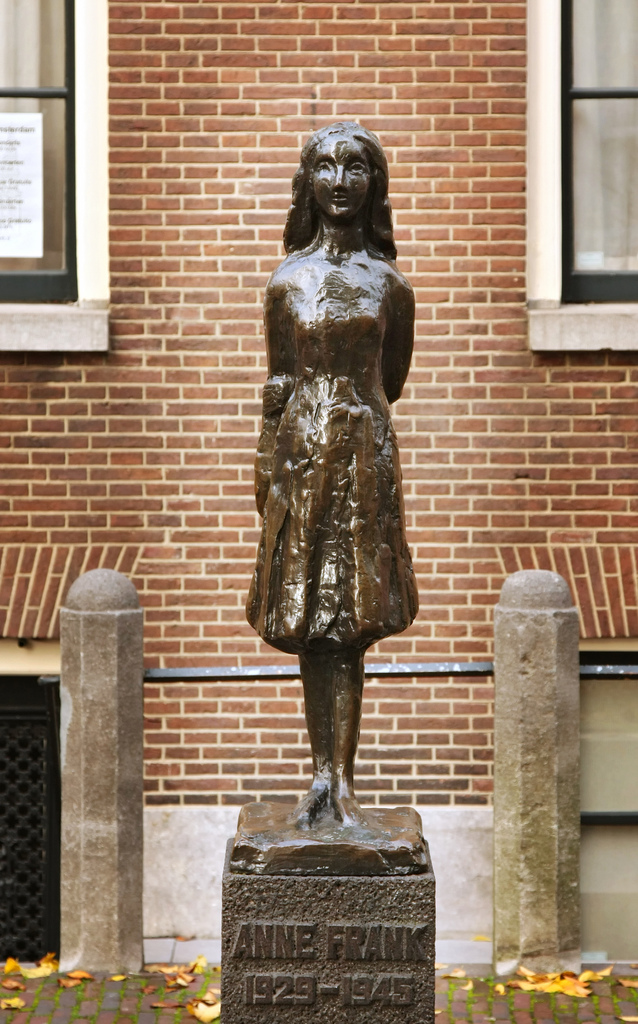
Statue of Anne Frank, by Mari Andriessen, outside the Westerkerk in Amsterdam.

Only in 1671 did the large Ashkenazi community inaugurate their own synagogue, the Great Synagogue, which stood opposite to the Sephardic Esnoga Synagogue. Soon after, several other synagogues were built, among them the Obbene Shul (1685-1686), the Dritt Shul (1700) and the Neie Shul (1752, also known as the New Synagogue). For a long time, the Ashkenazi community was strongly focused on Central and Eastern Europe, the region where most of the Dutch Ashkenazi originated from. Rabbis, cantors and teachers hailed from Poland and Germany. Up until the 19th century, most of the Ashkenazi Jews spoke Yiddish, with some Dutch influences. Meanwhile, the community grew and flourished. At the end of the 18th century, the 20,000-strong Ashkenazi community was one of the largest in Western and Central Europe.

== The Holocaust ==
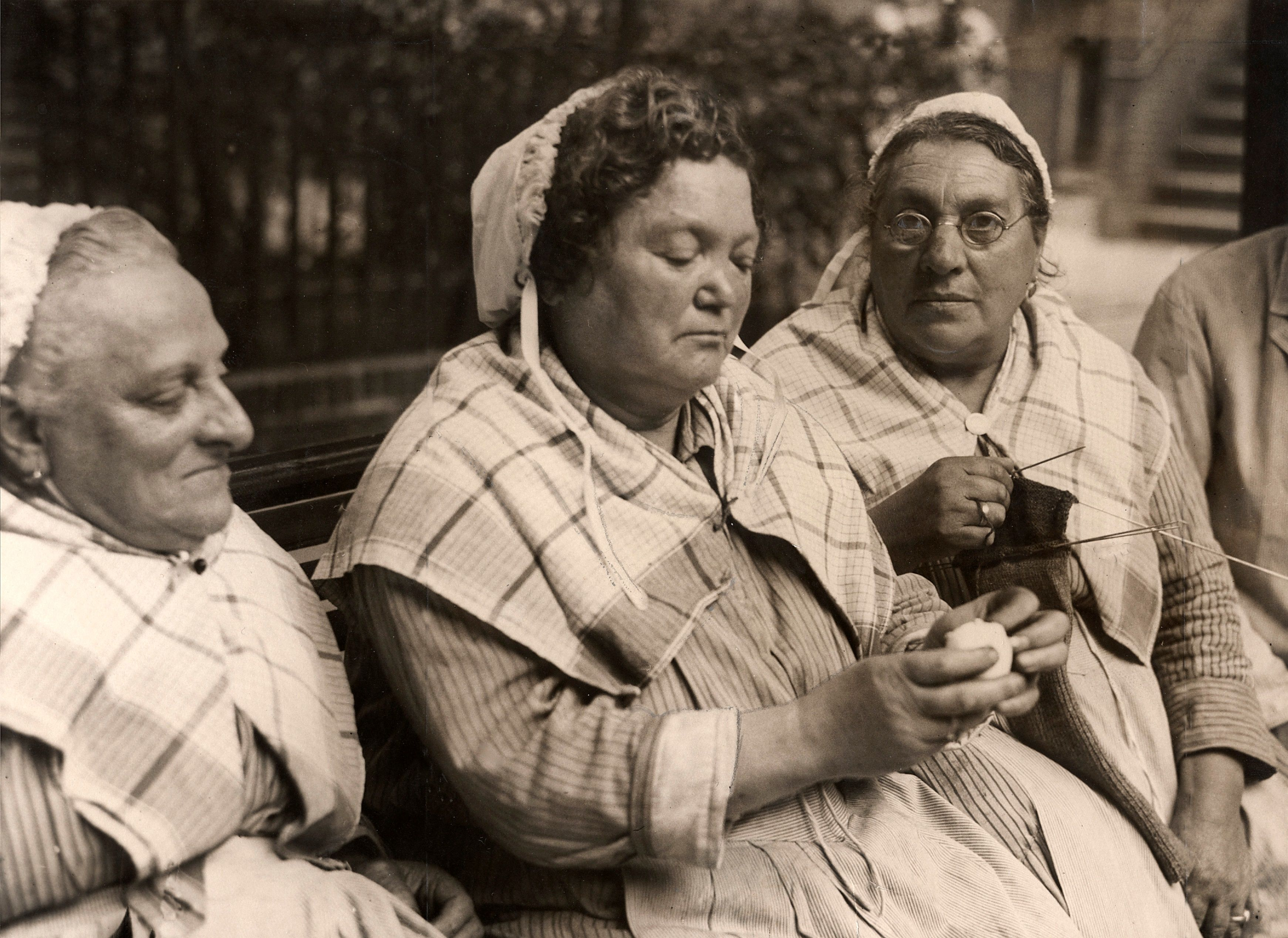
Three Jewish women in the home for the elderly in Amsterdam. The Netherlands, before 1940.

Occupation of Amsterdam by Nazi Germany began 10 May 1940. Amsterdam, the largest city in the Netherlands, had an estimated 75–80,000 Jews, approximately 53–57% of the country's Jewish population. Among them was the German Jewish family of Anne Frank.

Approximately 25–35,000 of the Dutch Jews were refugees. but most of these were not in Amsterdam.

Although less than 10 percent of Amsterdam's population was Jewish, there were two seemingly contradictory outcomes:

- a general strike against mass Nazi arrests of Jews
- about 75–80% of the Jewish population was deported and murdered.

Part of the Nazi action plan included consolidating the Dutch Jewish population into Amsterdam, prior to the "Final Solution." Canadian Forces liberated Amsterdam in early 1945.

== Prominent Jewish politicians ==
Six of Amsterdam's mayors were Jewish. Job Cohen was runner-up for the award of World Mayor in 2006.

== Cheider ==
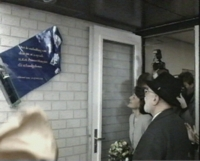
Princess Margriet opening the Cheider with Arthur Juda Cohen

In 1964 Adje Cohen began Jewish classes with five children in his home. This grew into an Orthodox Jewish school (Yeshiva) that provides education for children from kindergarten through high school. Many Orthodox families would have left The Netherlands if not for the existence of the Cheider: Boys and girls learn separately as orthodox Judaism requires, and the education is with a greater focus on the religious needs. By 1993 the Cheider had grown to over 230 pupils and 60 Staff members. The Cheider moved into its current building at Zeeland Street in Amsterdam Buitenveldert. Many prominent Dutch Figures attended the opening, most noteworthy was Princess Margriet who opened the new building.

== Jewish community in the 21st century ==
Most of the Amsterdam Jewish community (excluding the Progressive and Sephardic communities) is affiliated to the Ashkenazi Nederlands Israëlitisch Kerkgenootschap. These congregations combined form the Nederlands-Israëlietische Hoofdsynagoge (NIHS) (the Dutch acronym for the Jewish Community of Amsterdam). Some 3,000 Jews are formally part of the NIHS. The Progressive movement currently has some 1,700 Jewish members in Amsterdam, affiliated to the Nederlands Verbond voor Progressief Jodendom. Smaller Jewish communities include the Sephardic Portugees-Israëlitisch Kerkgenootschap (270 families in and out of Amsterdam) and Beit Ha'Chidush, a community of some 200 members and 'friends' connected to Jewish Renewal and Reconstructionist Judaism. Several independent synagogues exist as well. The glossy Joods Jaarboek (Jewish Yearbook), is based in Amsterdam, as well as the weekly Dutch Jewish newspaper in print: the Nieuw Israëlitisch Weekblad.

=== Contemporary synagogues ===
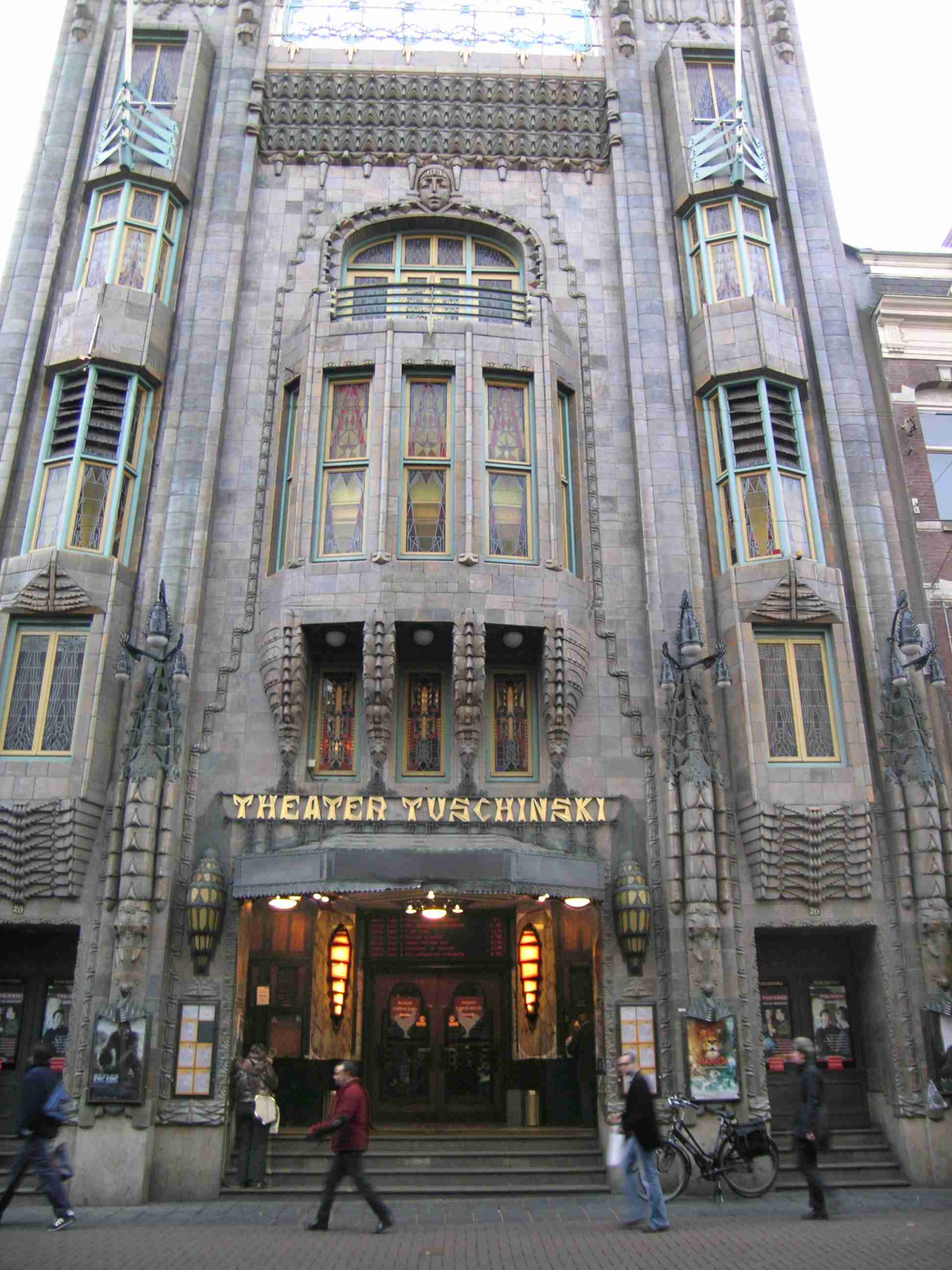
The Tuschinski Theater, founded by Polish-Jewish-Dutch businessman Abraham Icek Tuschinski

There are functioning synagogues in Amsterdam at the following addresses.

Ashkenazi
Nederlands Israëlitisch Kerkgenootschap (Modern Orthodox; Orthodox)

- Gerard Doustraat 238 (the Gerard Dou Synagogue) (congregation Tesjoengat Israël)
- Gerrit van der Veenstraat 26 (the Kehillas Ja'akov)
- Jacob Obrechtplein/Heinzestraat 3 (the synagogue is called the Raw Aron Schuster Synagogue)
- Lekstraat 61 (the Lekstraat Synagogue built in 1937; Charedi)
- Nieuwe Kerkstraat 149 (called the Russische sjoel or Russian Shul)
- Vasco da Gamastraat 19 (called the Synagogue West due to its location in the west of Amsterdam)
- There is also a synagogue present in Jewish nursing home Beth Shalom

Progressive
Nederlands Verbond voor Progressief Jodendom (Progressive)

- Jacob Soetendorpstraat 8

Reconstructionist
Beit Ha'Chidush (Jewish Renewal/Reconstructionist Judaism/Liberal Judaism)

- Nieuwe Uilenburgerstraat 91 (called the Uilenburger Synagoge)

Sephardic
Portugees-Israëlitisch Kerkgenootschap (Sephardic Judaism)

- Mr. Visserplein 3 (the Esnoga Synagogue)

=== Kashrut in Amsterdam ===
Kosher food is available in Amsterdam restaurants and shops. There is the possibility of eating kosher in Restaurant Ha-Carmel, and the well-known Sandwichshop Sal-Meijer.

=== Jewish culture ===
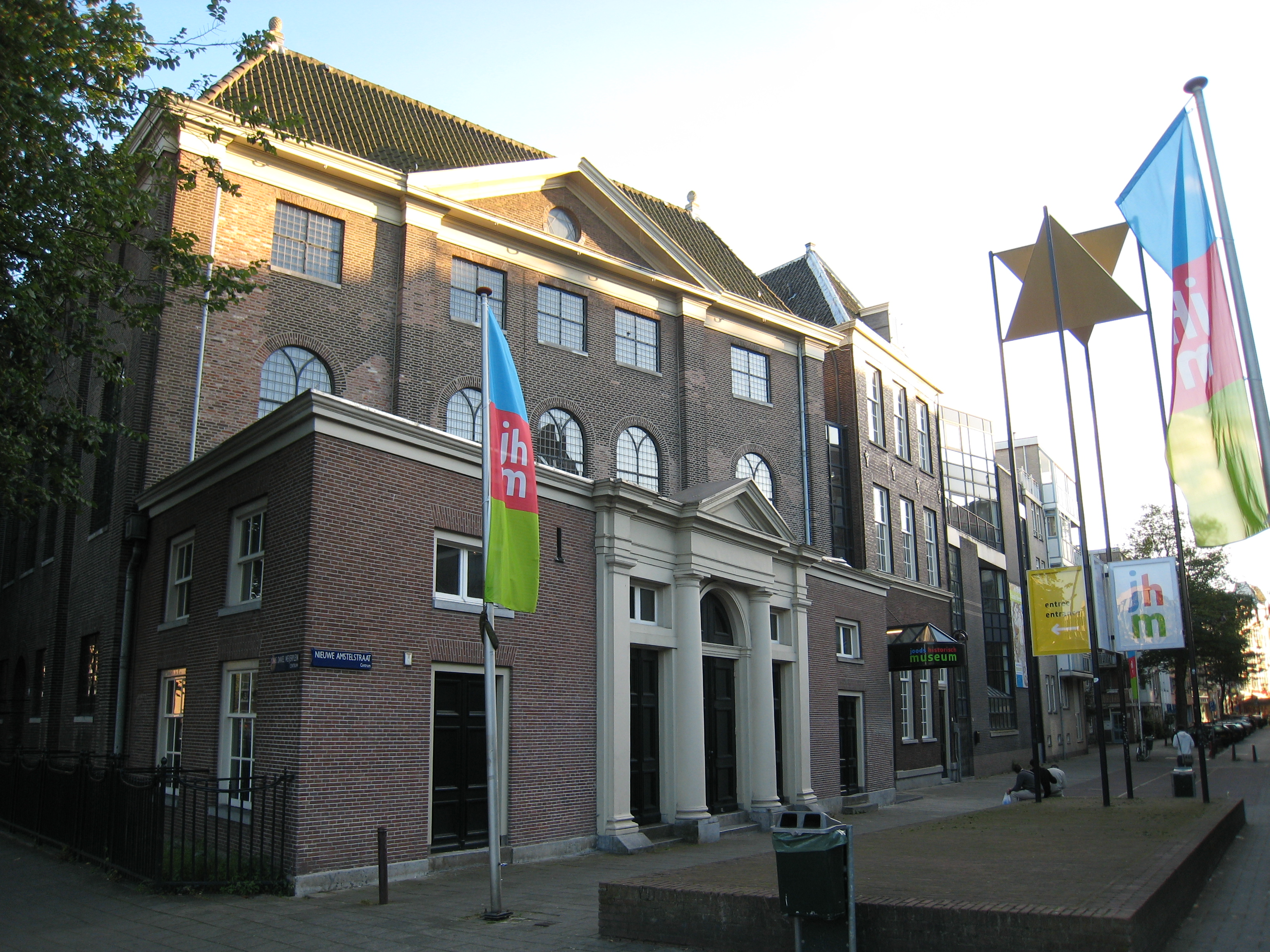
Joods Historisch Museum

The Joods Historisch Museum is the center of Jewish culture in Amsterdam. Other Jewish cultural events include the Internationaal Joods Muziekfestival (International Jewish Music Festival) and the Joods Film Festival (Jewish Film Festival).

The Anne Frank House hosts a permanent exhibit on the story of Anne Frank.

=== Jewish cemeteries ===
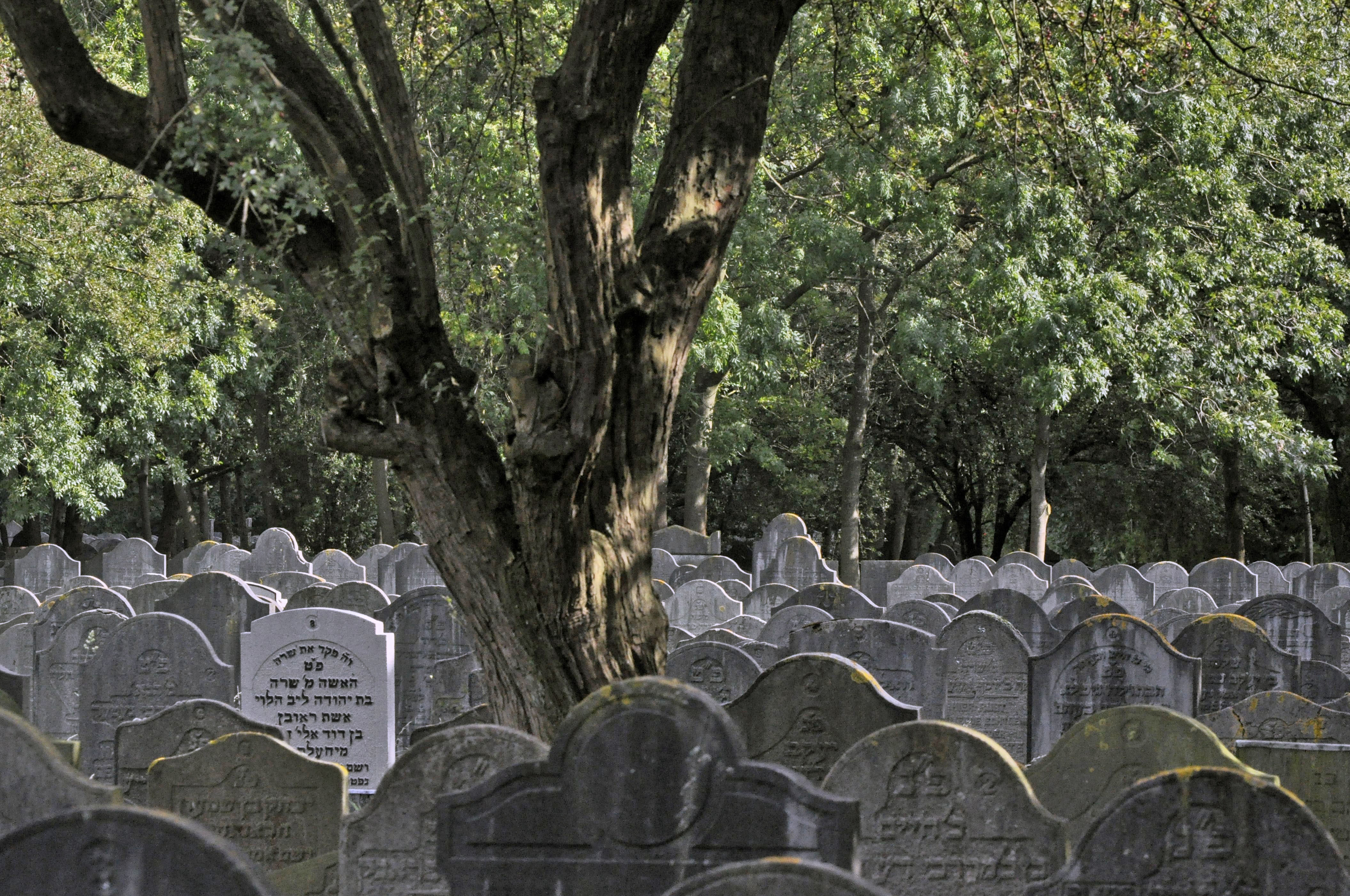
Field A-7 of the Jewish Cemetery of Diemen, which can be seen from trains leaving Amsterdam from the East.

Six Jewish cemeteries exist in Amsterdam and surroundings, three Orthodox Ashkenazi (affiliated to the NIK), two linked to the Progressive community and one Sephardic. The Ashkenazi cemetery at Muiderberg is still frequently used by the Orthodox Jewish community. The Orthodox Ashkenazi cemetery at Zeeburg, founded in 1714, was the burial ground for some 100,000 Jews between 1714 and 1942. After part of the ground of the cemetery was sold in 1956, many graves were transported to the Orthodox Ashkenazi Jewish cemetery near Diemen (also still in use, but less frequent than the one in Muiderberg). A Sephardic cemetery, Beth Haim, exists near the small town of Ouderkerk aan de Amstel, containing the graves of some 28,000 Sephardic Jews. Two Progressive cemeteries, one in Hoofddorp (founded in 1937) and one in Amstelveen (founded in 2002), are used by the large Progressive community.

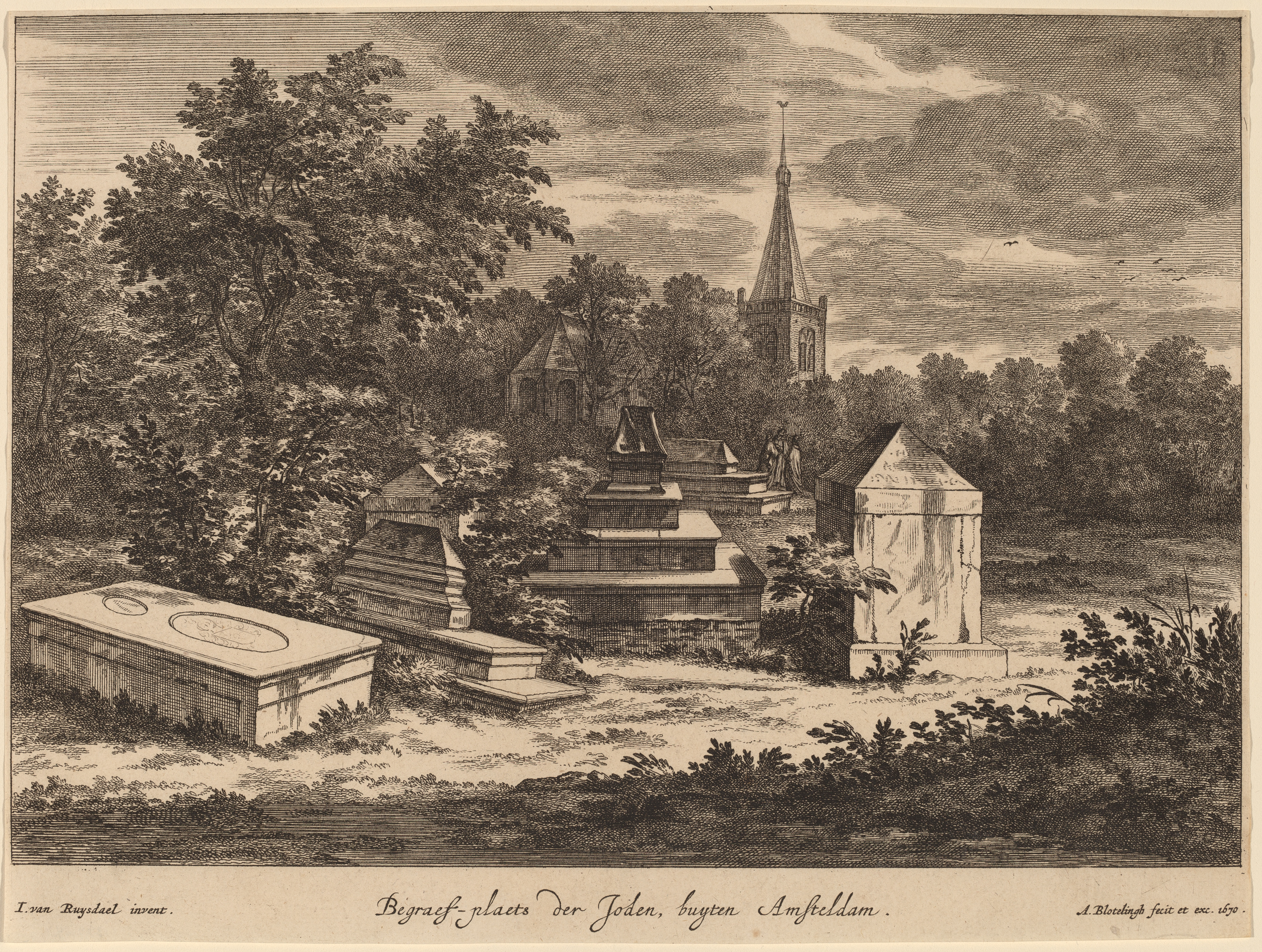
Abraham Blooteling after Jacob van Ruisdael, Begraef-plaets der Joden, buyten Amsteldam (Jewish Cemetery outside Amsterdam), 1670, etching on laid paper; sheet size: 20.8 x 27.8 cm (8 3/16 x 10 15/16 in.). National Gallery of Art, Washington DC, Ailsa Mellon Bruce Fund, 1999.64.1

== See also ==
- History of the Jews in the Netherlands
- Jodenbreestraat
- List of Dutch Jews
- National Holocaust Names Memorial (Amsterdam)
- November 2024 Amsterdam riots

== Sources ==
This article incorporates text from the United States Holocaust Memorial Museum, and has been released under the GFDL.
