= Jewish Cemetery of Diemen =

Cemetery in Amsterdam

Coordinates: 52°20′37″N 4°58′40″E

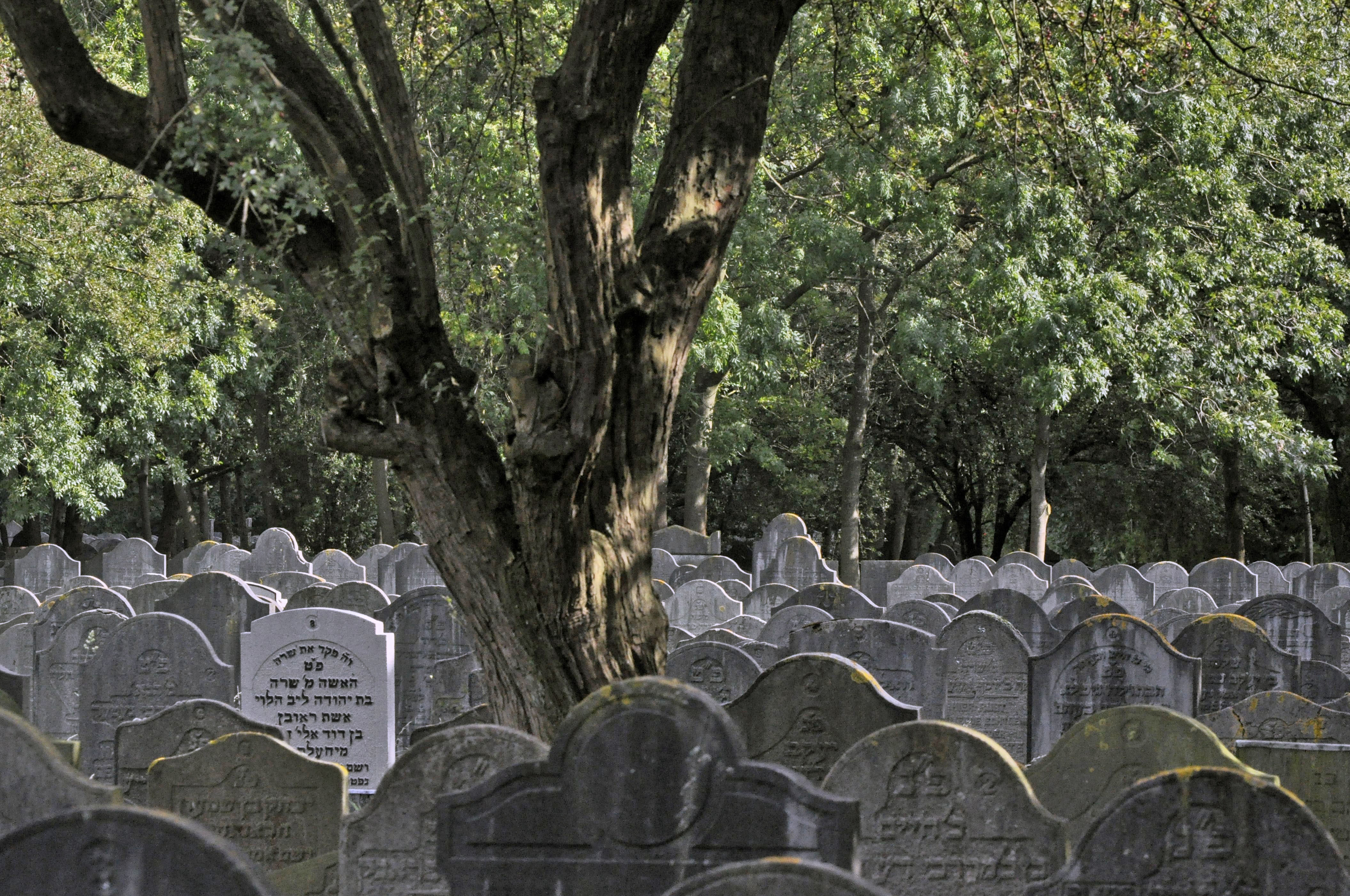
Field A-7

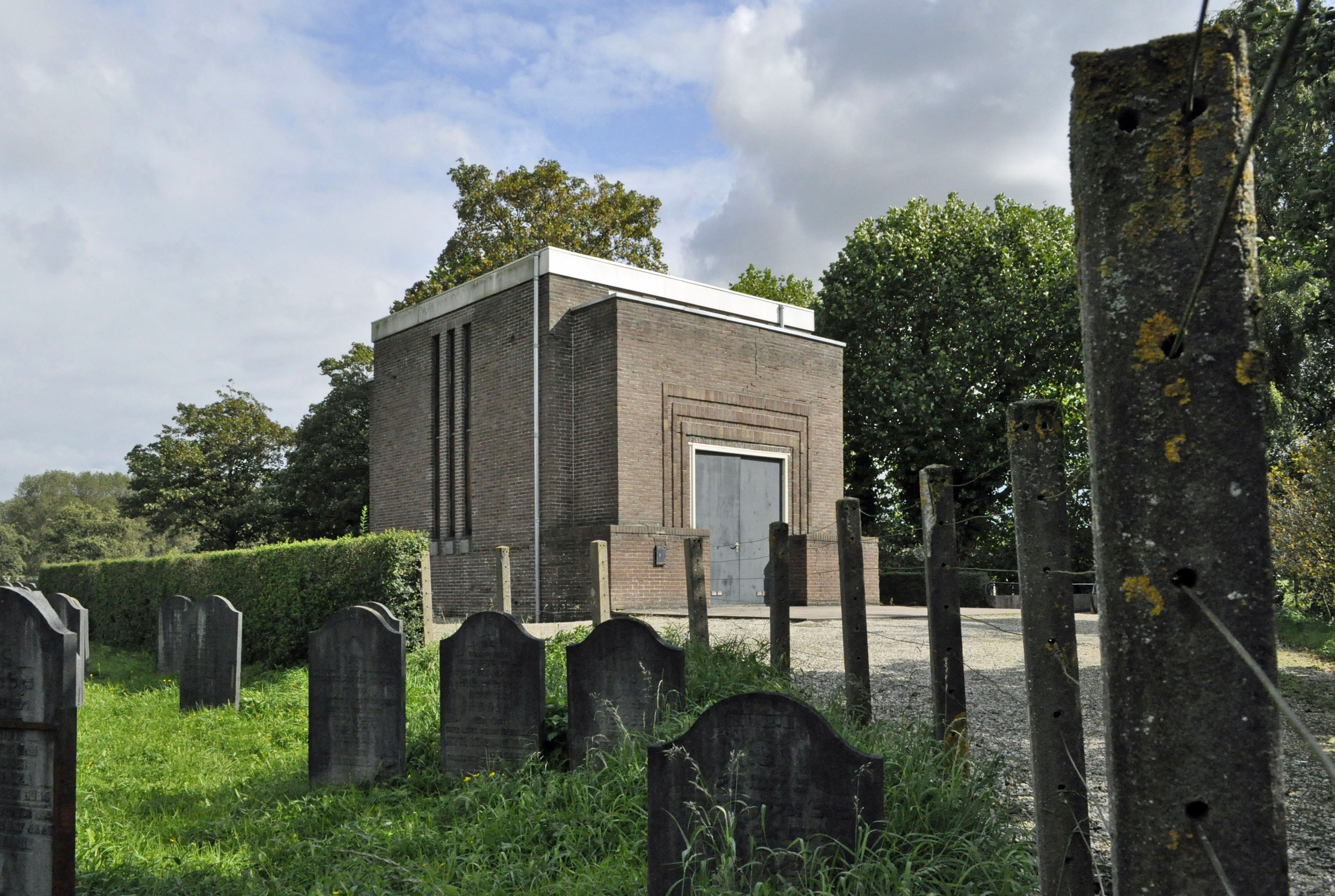
Metaheerhuis, built in 1931 by the Jewish architect Harry Elte Phzn (1880–1944) of Amsterdam.

The Jewish Cemetery of Diemen, or Joodse Begraafplaats Diemen in Diemen, is owned by the Jewish community of Amsterdam, which is a subsection of the "Nederlands Israëlitisch Kerkgenootschap". It came into use in 1914 when the older Jewish Cemetery Zeeburg in Amsterdam reached its limit.

In 1925 the cemetery was split by a train line. The cemetery can still be seen today by train passengers travelling eastwards from Amsterdam. Field A is the field 1914–1927, east. West of the train line are the fields B, C and D, in use from 1928.

Unusual for a Jewish cemetery is the presence of urns, most of which hold the remains of Jews who were cremated at Westerbork during the World War II years. The small Field U, with stones very close to each other, is the field with the urns from Westerbork.

In 1958 a large part of the Jewish Cemetery Zeeburg was relocated to Diemen, due to city of Amsterdam expansion (a smaller part was added to the Flevopark). Three fields, all called Field Z, with 28,000 graves and almost no individual stones, were brought over. A memorial stone explains the origin of Field Z. Some smaller stones alongside these Fields Z are placed.

Field D still is in use.
