= History of the Jews in Groningen =

Groningen has always been the largest town in the northern part of the Netherlands, resulting in a significant settlement of Jews throughout its history. The community reached a high of some 2,700 members at the beginning of the 20th century. Only a small part of the 2,400-strong community in 1941 managed to survive the Holocaust. Jewish life nevertheless continued after the war, and there is still a Jewish community present, aligned to the NIK.

== Early Jewish settlement ==
The first Jews in Groningen were reported in the 16th century, but it wasn't until the end of the 17th century that Jews could permanently live in the city, because of opposition from city council and religious authorities. There were some 50 Jews in the city around 1700, mostly hailing from Appingedam. In the vicinity of Groningen several towns and villages had full-grown Jewish communities, a consequence of the policy of forbidding Jews to settle in Groningen itself. The small Jewish community was banned from the city already in 1710 after accusations of theft, but some nevertheless stayed in the city. The community grew again from the 1730s onwards; there were 90 Jews living in the city in 1744. In 1776 this number had grown to 260. A full-fledged synagogue was inaugurated in 1756 in the future Kleine Folkingestraat, which would become the center of Jewish life in the city in the 200 years following, and had 30-40 member families in 1757.

== 19th century and early 20th century ==
The emancipation degrees of 1796 gave Jews the same rights in the Netherlands as all other civilians, as they were no longer seen as a separate nation living in the Netherlands. Instead of being called "Dutch Jews" they were now given the name of "Israelite Dutchmen". At that time there were 396 Jews living in the city. In the years following the city was named a "head synagogue" or central community, meaning the community was responsible for monitoring all the other smaller Jewish communities in Groningen province. The community grew to 754 persons in 1815, a growth of 90.4% in no more than two decades. Jewish life started to flourish. Due to assimilation tendencies from the Dutch government (due to the emancipation degrees Jews were for example no longer allowed to teach Yiddish in their schools), a split occurred within the community in 1851 between the more liberal elements, supporting these assimilationist tendencies, and the modern traditional elements, opposing it. In 1881 however the two groups were unified again. Meanwhile, the number of Jews in Groningen didn't stop growing, reaching 1,645 individuals in 1869 and 2,628 individuals in 1899 (an increase of some 564% in one century). This tremendous growth had two causes: a high birthrate; and the settlement of many Jews from small Jewish communities in Groningen province in the city. Many Jews were working as salesman, hawker, trader of livestock or shopkeeper. Some Jews became very successful, like Aletta Jacobs (first female doctor in the Netherlands and well-known fighter for women rights) and Jozef Israëls (famous impressionist painter). The community in Groningen managed to stay large and numerous despite the moving of many Jews to the western part of the country (most notably Amsterdam).

Number of Jews in Groningen 1700–2006
Year	Number of Jews	Source
1700	50	Jodeningroningen.nl
1744	90	Jodeningroningen.nl
1776	260	Jodeningroningen.nl
1796	396	Jodeningroningen.nl
1815	754	Jodeningroningen.nl
1840	1,200	Jewish Historical Museum
1869	1,645	Jodeningroningen.nl
1899	2,628	Jodeningroningen.nl
1930	2,408	Jewish Historical Museum
1941	2,724 / 2,843	Groningen University / Jodeningroningen.nl
1945	120	Groningen University
1948	293	Groningen University
1951	225	Jewish Historical Museum
1971	128	Jewish Historical Museum
1998	53	Jewish Historical Museum
2006	60 families	Friesch Dagblad

== Holocaust ==
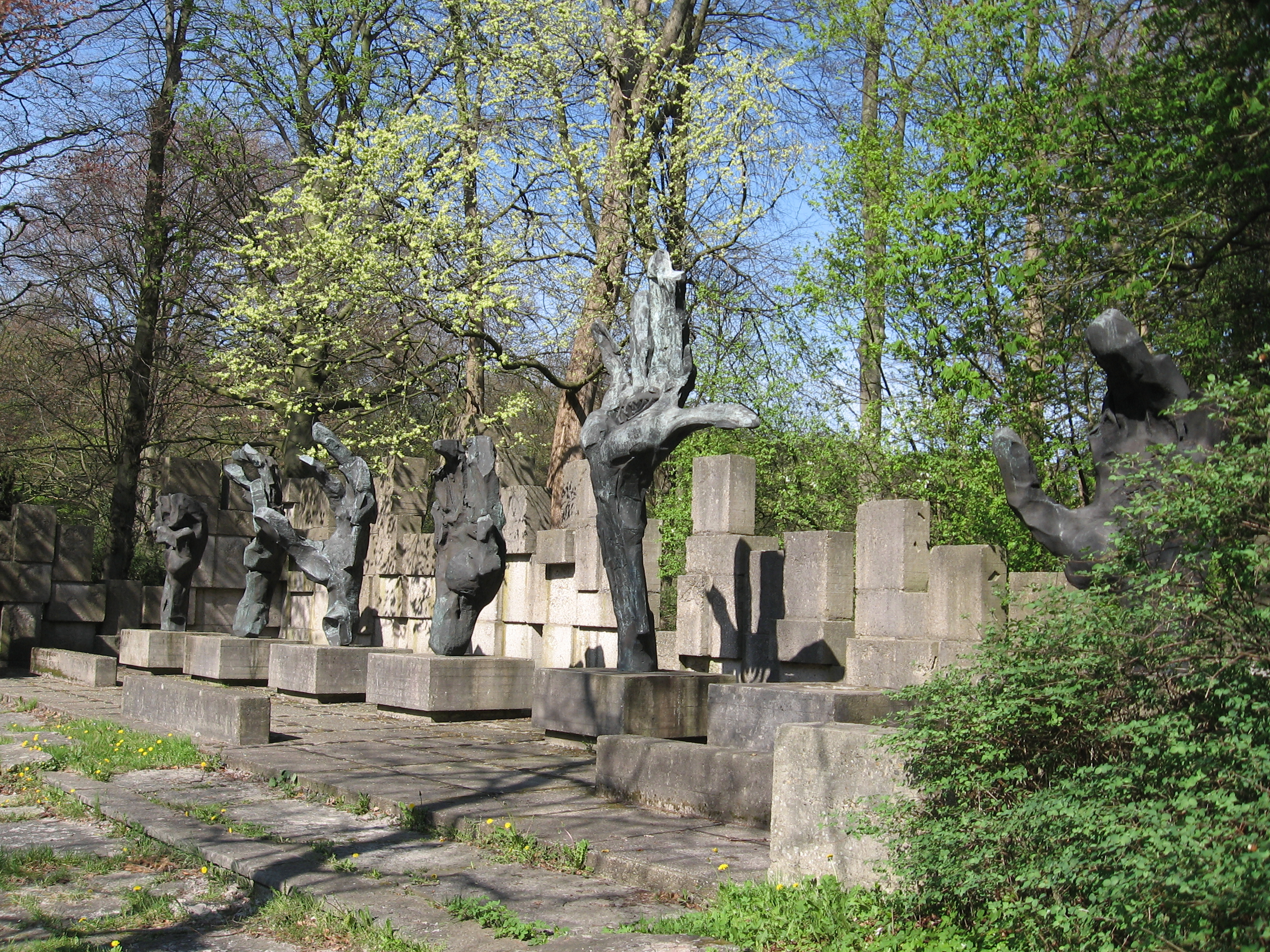
Jewish monument at Hereweg, Groningen

The Nazi authorities counted 2,724 (other sources say 2,843) Jews or Volljuden in Groningen in February 1941, when Jews were forced to register with Dutch authorities. Another 463 persons had at least one Jewish grandparent but were not considered Volljuden, bringing the total number of people in Groningen with at least one Jewish grandparent to 3,187. Most Jewish men, some 600 in total, were deported on 10 July 1942; another 110 men were deported on 30 September 1942. A razzia in the night of 2–3 October 1942 saw the deportation of some 650 Jewish women and children. They were sent to the Westerbork concentration camp nearby, and from thereon deported to Auschwitz, Sobibor, Bergen-Belsen or Theresienstadt. The Jews who were left in the city after the deportations in July, September and October 1942 were mostly deported throughout the remaining months of 1942 and the first months of 1943. The last Jews were deported in December 1943. A total of 2,550 Jews were deported to concentration camps (93.6% of the Jewish population). Only 10 survived. With more than 93% of the Jewish population killed, Jewish life in Groningen was completely destroyed. It was assumed that some 120 Jews returned to the city in 1945. There were an estimated 293 Jews present in 1948.

== Contemporary Jewish life ==
There is currently a functioning Jewish community in Groningen – the Nederlands Israëlitische Gemeente Groningen or NIG Groningen – aligned to the NIK. As of 2006 some 60 Jewish families are member of this congregation.

== Notable Groningen Jews ==
- Julia Culp – mezzosoprano
- Jozef Israëls – painter
- Aletta Jacobs – first Dutch woman to get a university degree
- Ida Vos – author
- Jacques Wallage – former mayor of Groningen
