= Beit Ha'Chidush =

Synagogue in Amsterdam, Netherlands

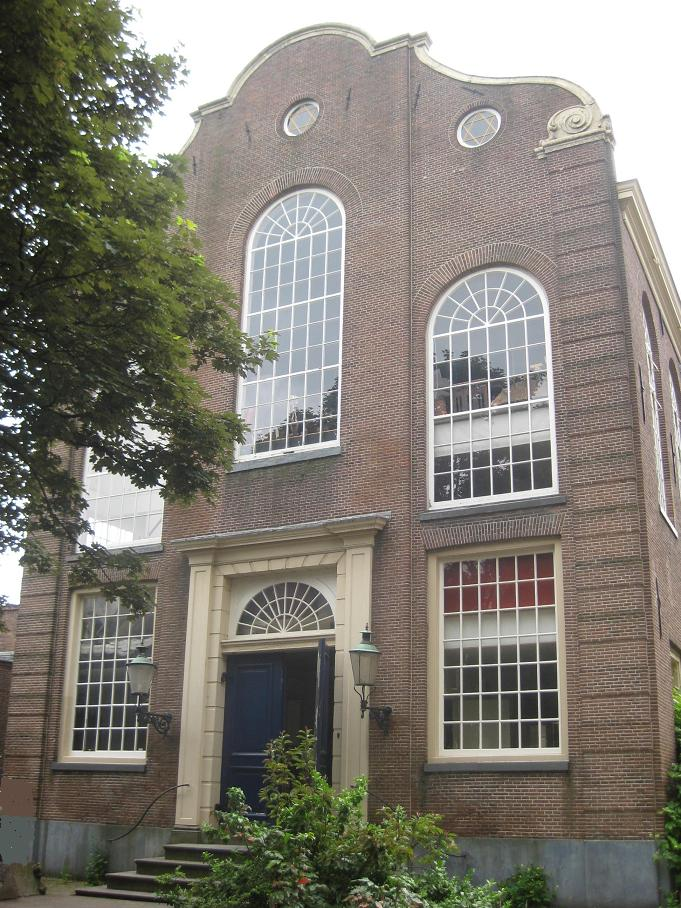
- The Uilenburg Synagogue, the place of worship for the congregation

- Location of the Uilenburg Synagogue, place of worship for the congregation, in Amsterdam

Religion
- Affiliation: Reform Judaism
- Ecclesiastical or organizational status: Synagogue
- Leadership: Tamarah Benima
- Status: Active

Location
- Location: Nieuwe Uilenburgerstraat 91, Central Amsterdam, Amsterdam, North Holland
- Country: The Netherlands
- Interactive map of Beit Ha'Chidush
- Coordinates: 52°22′13″N 4°54′19″E

Architecture
- Type: Synagogue architecture
- Style: Louis XV style
- Established: 1995 (as a congregation)
- Completed: 1766 (as Uilenburg Synagogue)

Website
- beithachidush.nl (in Dutch)

Beit Ha'Chidush (meaning House of Renewal in Hebrew), abbreviated as BHC is a Progressive Jewish congregation, located in Amsterdam, in the North Holland region of The Netherlands. The congregation was founded in 1995 by predominately expatriate Jews with secular and religious backgrounds who wanted to create a welcoming, inspiring and renewed Jewish congregation.

Since 1997, the congregation has worshiped from the Uilenburg Synagogue, a synagogue located at Nieuwe Uilenburgerstraat 91, in Central Amsterdam. The synagogue was completed in the Louis XV style in 1766 and used by another congregation up until World War II. After a period of profane use by the Municipality of Amsterdam, the synagogue was transferred to the Uilenburgersjoel Foundation, for use by a variety of Jewish organisations.

== Overview ==
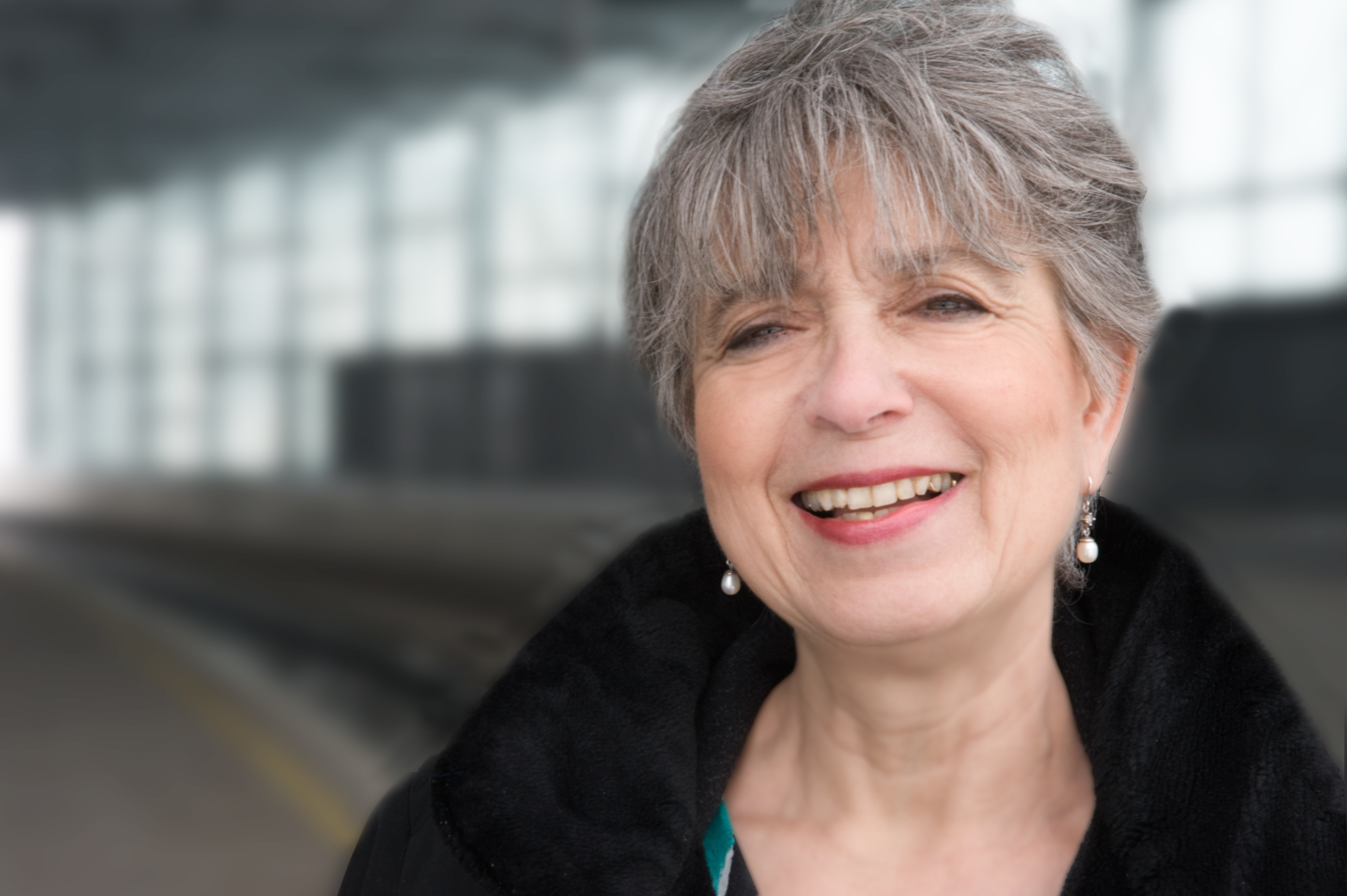
Rabbi Tamarah Benima

BHC is an independent modern and progressive community where anyone with a Jewish background, either paternal or maternal, is welcome. People with a non-Jewish partner are more than welcome to attend the services together with their partner. BHC is a community based on equality and inclusiveness and welcomes individuals of all genders and sexual orientations.

There are typically three Shabbat services each month: two on Friday evenings and one on Saturday morning, as well as services on Holidays. Since 1997 BHC uses the Uilenburger Synagogue (1766) for services. Once a month a tish is organized for members, this is a shabbat dinner with the rabbi at the home of one of the members. Beit Ha'Chidush organises since 2004 a yearly Pride Shabbat, a festive service on the first Friday night of August (unless 1 August falls on a Saturday, in that case its on the last Friday of July).

BHC organizes Jewish education for children (Ledor Wador), as well as shiurim (lessons) on Jewish topics for adults.

BHC is a democratic organization with elected board members and general assemblies. All important decisions are submitted to the members at the general assemblies which occur at least twice a year. BHC is also participatory: Members are encouraged to actively take part in all activities and also develop their own initiatives.

As of June 2015, the rabbi is Tamarah Benima.

== History ==
In 1995, a number of both secular as well as religious Jews, unsatisfied with the present Jewish congregations, made the move of starting their own congregation, different from the existing Jewish organisations. The first shabbat service of Beit Ha'Chidush was soon to be held on 1 December 1995. A short interview with the founders was published in the newspaper NRC in 1997. Several rabbis ('Flying rabbis') - mostly from progressive Jewish communities overseas - were in charge of the services. This changed on 1 May 2005, when German-born Elisa Klapheck became the community's first own rabbi; she is the first female rabbi in Dutch Jewish history. She led the congregation from 2005 until her departure in 2009 to Frankfurt. Since then Clary Rooda (at the time rabbi in training) and rabbi Hannah Nathans have led the services at Beit Ha'Chidush.

The community currently has some 70 active members, 50 'friends' and another 100 persons who visit services and activities on occasion. A new Torah was welcomed in the community on 23 May 2007. A new Aron Kodesh (the ark that contains the Torah scrolls) was installed in January 2017. There are currently plans under way within the community to work together with the NVPJ on issues like Jewish burial and the circumcision of gerim.

== Affiliation ==
Beit Ha'Chidush draws from traditional and modern Jewish sources. Inspiration is found in the Torah, the Talmud and other classical sources as well as in today's renewal thinkers and groups in Europe, Israel and the United States. Beit Ha'Chidush has strong ties to Jewish Renewal and Reconstructionist Judaism in the United States, Liberal Judaism in the United Kingdom, and to Humanistic Judaism. Since its establishment in 1995 Beit Ha’Chidush has been supported by many progressive rabbis in Europe and the United States. It is an associate member of Liberal Judaism and cooperates with the Dutch Union for Progressive Judaism. A large part of the BHC community hails from outside the Netherlands. The founding members of Beit Ha'Chidush were very much in favor of establishing a new community which was more diverse, open and renewed in comparison to the already existing Jewish communities in the Netherlands.

BHC is a supporter of the Queer Shabbaton event, an annual weekend for LGBTQI+ Jews from all over the world that was held in 2005 and 2006 during the Amsterdam Gay Pride. The events took place at the Uilenburger Synagogue. Since 2004 there is also an annual Pride shabbat service. In 2010 BHC participated in the Gay Pride with its own boat. Here you can find a nice picture of the event.

== See also ==
- History of the Jews in the Netherlands
- List of synagogues in the Netherlands
