= Delft Synagogue =

Synagogue in Delft, Netherlands

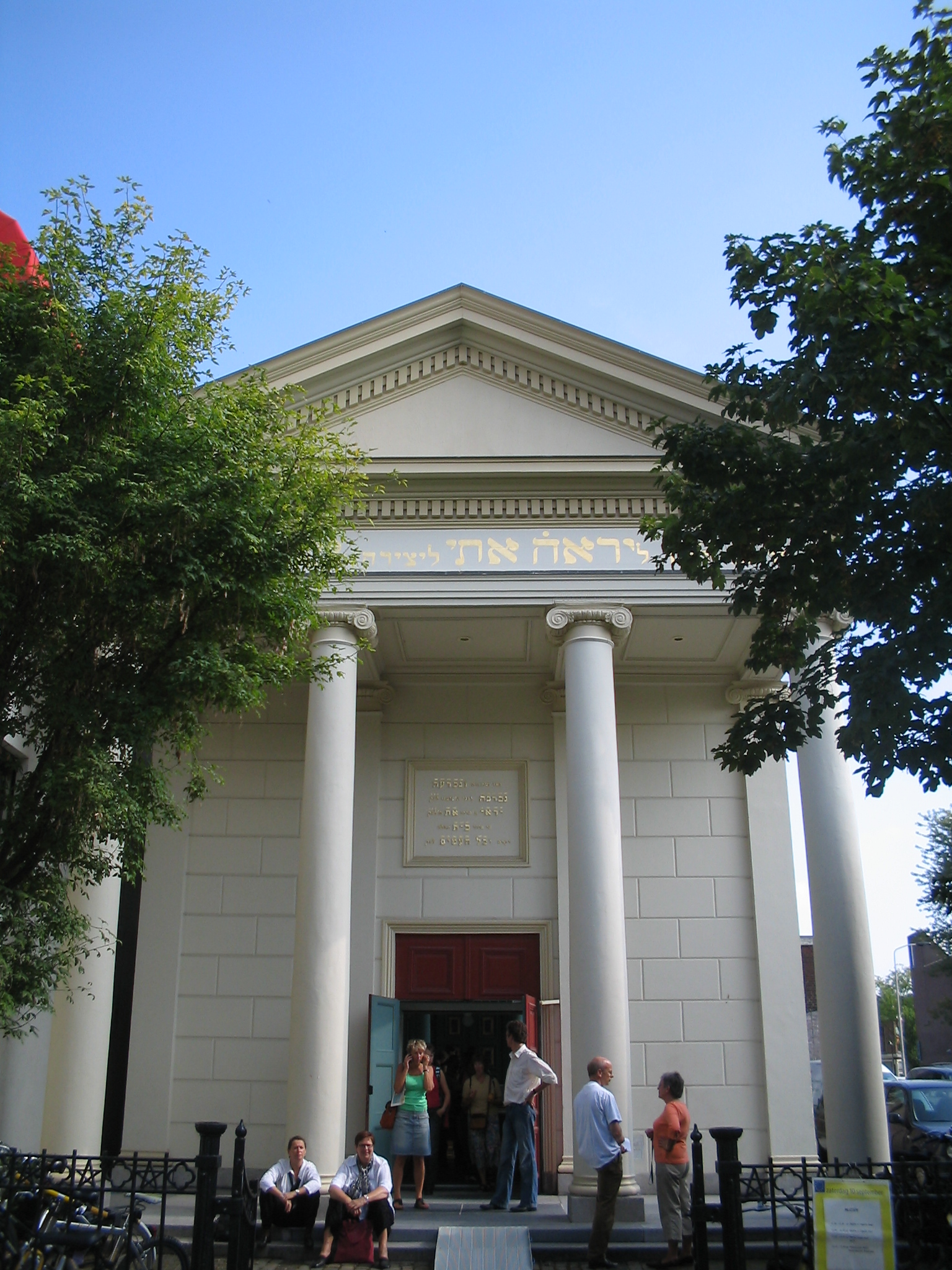
- The synagogue in 2005

- Location of the synagogue in South Holland

Religion
- Affiliation: Reconstructionist Judaism
- Rite: Nusach Ashkenaz
- Ecclesiastical or organizational status: Synagogue (1862–1952); Cultural center; Synagogue (since 2005)
- Leadership: Rabbi Hannah Nathans
- Status: Active

Location
- Location: Koornmarkt 12, Delft, South Holland
- Country: The Netherlands
- Interactive map of Delft Synagogue
- Coordinates: 52°00′32″N 4°21′36″E

Architecture
- Architect: L. Winkel
- Type: Synagogue architecture
- Style: Neoclassical
- Established: 1821 (as a congregation); 2005 (new congregation)
- Groundbreaking: 1861
- Completed: 1862
- Materials: Brick

Website
- klal-israel.nl (in Dutch)

The Delft Synagogue is a Reconstructionist Jewish congregation and synagogue, located at Koornmarkt 12, in the city of Delft, in the South Holland region of The Netherlands. Designed by L. Winkel in the Neoclassical style, the synagogue was completed in 1862, fell into disuse after World War II, was subsequently restored and reconsecrated from 1974.

Since 2005, the synagogue has been home to the OJG Klal Israël (Dutch: OPEN Joodse Gemeente Klal Israël congregation, translates into English as the OPEN Jewish Congregation Klal Israel). Services are held in the synagogue twice a month.

Rabbi Hannah Nathans is rabbi of OJG Klal Israël since 2 October 2016.

== History ==
There is evidence of Jewish settlement in Delft from 1811. Services were initially held in private homes until official recognition of the community was granted in 1821. The community inaugurated a synagogue on the Koornmarkt in the center of Delft in 1862.

During the World War II, Nazis deported and executed most of the Jews in the city. The synagogue survived, however its interior furnishings were devastated. In 1952, the former synagogue was sold to the municipality of Delft and by 1962, the congregation merged into a congregation in The Hague. The synagogue building was subsequently declared a national monument and restored in 1974. The building served as a cultural center until 1996, when it was reassigned to the Stichting Behoud Synagoge Delft, and fully restored. The building reopened in 2003 as a cultural center and the OJG Klal Israël congregation began using the building as a synagogue from 2005.

== Position of the congregation ==
OJG Klal Israël is part of Progressive Judaism, and holds progressive views on, among many issues, homosexuality, the role of women and the role of non-Jewish family members in the congregation. Its essential moral foundations are: equity and justice, equality, democracy and peace. The congregation defines itself as independent and "reformodox". It largely follows the Dutch liberal liturgy. According to the Reconstructionist vision, it views Torah as a binding blueprint for a meaningful Jewish life. However, in accordance with the talmudic injunction not to accept jurisprudence unquestioningly, it maintains that the interpretation of the law must be shaped by a dynamic and critical process that takes into account the needs and peculiarities of the modern world, and of the evolving Jewish civilization.

== See also ==
- History of the Jews in the Netherlands
- List of synagogues in the Netherlands
