= Hannah Nathans =

Hannah Nathans (born 1944) is an author and the rabbi of the Open Jewish Congregation Klal Israel in Delft.

== Life ==
Nathans was born in 1944 in Amsterdam, Netherlands. Hannah is of Jewish Patrilineal descent.

Nathans worked for the Dutch government as a policymaker, trainer, and consultant from 1970 to 1985. In 1989, after several years working as a senior consultant in a training and consulting firm, she started her own business, named Nathan's Consultancy. She was one of the first to introduce the Enneagram in the Netherlands and would later write a book on the subject.

In 2005, Nathans completed training as a Jewish Spiritual Director at Lev Shomea, Institute for Jewish Spiritual Direction. In 2007, Nathan's Consultancy became part of Rijnconsult, and Nathans founded HaMakor, Centre for Jewish Spirituality. Nathans earned a masters in Hebrew language and culture at the University of Amsterdam. She studied to become a rabbi with Aleph Alliance for Jewish Renewal, a neo-hasidic movement founded by Rabbi Zalman Schachter-Shalomi, where she received her Semikha in January 2014.

At the beginning of 2012, she worked as a rabbi in the congregation Beit ha’Chidush (House of Renewal), affiliated with Liberal Judaism of UK.

In 2016, she became the rabbi of the Open Jewish Congregation Klal Israel in Delft, is a Reconstructionist community with an outreach orientation where those with Jewish ancestry or interest in Judaism are welcome.

== Works ==
- Adviseren als tweede beroep, resultaat bereiken als adviseur (1991/1995/2005/2015) (English: Consulting as second profession)
- Werken met het Enneagram, naar persoonlijk meesterschap en sociale intelligentie (Scriptum 2000) (English: The enneagram at work)
- Typisch ik, typisch jij; het enneagram, een handleiding bij mensen (Scriptum 2005) (English: Typically me, typically you; the enneagram a manual for people)
- Een wortel die alsem en gal voortbrengt; het 20e eeuwse Chassidisme van Shalom Noach Berezovsky (2011) (English: A root oozing wormwood and gal; the 20th century Hasidism of Shalom Noach Berezovsky)
- Werkboek Adviseren als tweede beroep (Kluwer 2012, mede-auteurs Marijke Broekhuijsen, Catalina Auer, Paul Meijer) (English: Work book Consulting as second profession)
- Can someone in the process of conversion serve as shali’ach tzibbur? in R.Daniel Siegel, Renewing ger toshav; opening the gates that more may enter to praise God (2017)
