= History of the Jews in Eindhoven =

Eindhoven is a municipality and a city located in the province of North Brabant in the south of the Netherlands, originally at the confluence of the Dommel and Gender brooks. The Gender has been dammed off in the post-war years, but the Dommel still runs through it.

It was not allowed for Jews to settle in the city of Eindhoven until 1772, when stadtholder Willem V summoned the city council to open its doors for Jews. Not until 1796 however were Jews totally free to settle in Eindhoven - between 1772 and 1796 the city council succeeded in summoning numerous orders to make Jewish settlement in the city incredibly difficult. Because of the prohibition for Jews to settle within the city, nearby villages contained fairly large numbers of Jews. However, from 1796 onward, the Jewish presence in Eindhoven started to grow considerably. Most of the Jews were immigrants from Germany, specifically from Cologne, Krefeld and Bad Kreuznach. They were all Ashkenazi. A synagogue was put into use. After another period of growth after 1850, the city became the seat of the chief rabbinate for the province of North Brabant.

Most of the Jews who settled in Eindhoven were butchers, cattle dealers, shopkeepers and hawkers. Later on, when the city started to industrialize, certain Jewish families played a significant role in the further development of the city, among them the Elias family.

In the 1930s, numbers of Jewish refugees, notably from Germany but also from Austria, Poland and Hungary, started to arrive in the city. In 1941, 84 Jewish refugees were counted by the Nazi authorities, 57 from Germany and others from Austria, Poland, the Czech Republic, Hungary and Lithuania.

== The Holocaust ==
In August 1940, a total of 561 Jews were counted in Eindhoven. After the invasion of the Netherlands in May 1940, the country was placed under a civil administration led by virulent antisemites like Arthur Seyss-Inquart (1892-1946) and Hans Rauter (1895-1949), who quickly introduced anti-Jewish legislation. Only 13 Jews from Eindhoven had managed to escape to other countries, notably the United Kingdom. Among them were members of the prominent Elias family. From August 1940 to December 1941, 57 Jews left Eindhoven, but another 134 settled within its borders, bringing the number of Jews to 638 in December 1941. After 1941, another 228 Jews moved to Eindhoven, bringing the Jewish community to a height of 866 persons.

Besides these full-Jews, another 123 half-Jews and 61 quarter-Jews were counted in December 1941.

During the period 1940 - 1945, a total number of 936 Jews had lived at one moment in Eindhoven.

- 332 (35%) were murdered in the extermination- and concentration camps in Central Europe (notably Auschwitz and Sobibor). 180 Jews were murdered in Auschwitz; 61 in Sobibor. The remaining 91 Jews died in Central Europe or have an unknown place of death.
- 63 Jews who were deported survived the camps, a "high" number when you consider that this number meant that some 16% of deported Jews from Eindhoven survived death camps like Auschwitz, whereas nationwide this number was closer to 5% of all deported Jews.
- 455 Jews managed to survive by hiding or leaving the country.
- 65 Jews were part of a mixed marriage (with a non-Jew) and by that escaped deportation and death.
- Another 21 Jews died of natural causes between 1940 and 1945.

=== Central Registration Office for Jews ===
After the liberation of the southern parts of the Netherlands in the autumn of 1944, the Central Registration Office for Jews was founded in the city of Maastricht. Under the auspices of the Red Cross, Dutch Jews who had survived the war were registered at the Bureau. It was useful for surviving Jews in finding their loved ones and Jewish friends, to see whether they were still alive and could be reached. At the end of 1944, the Bureau was moved to Eindhoven. In May 1945, some 2,500 Jews had been registered. This number grew to 21,674 in December 1945.

=== Intermediate station for surviving Jews ===
Eindhoven, which was the temporary capital of the liberated Netherlands, served as an intermediate station for hidden Jews and fled Jews who returned to the southern part of the Netherlands after that region had been liberated in September 1944. Shelters were founded in several places in Eindhoven. When the first camp survivors arrived from Germany, many Jews who had survived the Second World War through hiding or fleeing the country were faced with the cruel reality that most of their deported family members and loved ones would not return. Any hope of seeing them back was shattered when survivors of the Bergen Belsen concentration camp arrived at Eindhoven Airport in April 1945, and reported that the vast majority of Dutch Jews had been murdered in the camps.

=== Jewish orphans ===
Many Jewish children survived in the Netherlands by going into hiding. By placing them with foster families, numerous children were saved while many parents were murdered in the extermination and concentration camps. Some 1,400 Jewish children in the Netherlands thus became orphans. At the end of the war it soon became clear to members of the surviving Jewish communities that many foster families were reluctant in bringing the children back to the Jewish community - many foster parents had grown attached to the Jewish orphans, some had given them a Christian upbringing and simply refused to give them back to the Jewish community, who believed these Jewish children should stay part of the Jewish nation, especially after it became clear that the majority of Dutch Jews had not survived the Holocaust. Some Jewish families desperately tried to "collect" as many as Jewish orphans as they could and serve as a foster family until the children were able to (illegally) emigrate to Palestine. This was also the case in Eindhoven, where most notably Abraham de Jong and his wife gave shelter to some 12 Jewish orphans, most of whom eventually travelled to Palestine. But even these attempts by individual Jews did not prevent that in 1949, some 358 of the 1,400 Jewish orphans had been placed within a non-Jewish environment. Even up to this day, the way how the Dutch government dealt with this issue has caused pain and bitterness within the Jewish community.

== After the war ==
After the war, the Jewish community immediately started to reconstruct its synagogue in the Kerkstraat (Church Street), which had been severely damaged during a German bombardment on September 19, 1944. On May 22, 1947, it was again put into use. However, due to plans to broaden the Kerkstraat in 1953, the synagogue eventually had to be demolished. This happened in February 1959. On November 17, 1958, a new synagogue was inaugurated in a residential home in the Hendrik Casimirstraat (Hendrik Casimir Street) - it has served as the synagogue for the Jewish community since then. Nowadays, the community is led by M.L. Witsema (not the rabbi of the community); chairman of the community is the 40-year-old Max Loewenstein. The community consists of approximately 70 individuals, although the total number of Jews in Eindhoven and surroundings (including Israeli expats) is thought to be more than twice that number (some 200); however it is believed that several Jewish families in Eindhoven do not wish to visit the (Orthodox) synagogue in Eindhoven, but instead visit the (Progressive) synagogue in Tilburg, Aree Hanegev located approximately 35 kilometers northwest of the City. The Jewish community is part of the Orthodox Nederlands Israëlitisch Kerkgenootschap (NIK). Regular weekly services are not held at the synagogue due to the absence of enough adult Jewish men within the community to form the minyan of ten adult men every week, which is required within the Orthodox stream. During the High Holidays services are held, due to the larger number of individuals (including enough adult men) who visit the synagogue during these days.

Number of Jews in Eindhoven and surroundings:

- 1809: 186
- 1840: 212
- 1869: 274
- 1899: 339
- 1930: 431
- 1940: 561
- 1941: 638
- 1945: approximately 300
- 1951: 210
- 1971: 164
- 1998: 102

== Literature ==
- Wissen, Mariëtte van (2007-05-05). Jong en joods (Young and Jewish). Eindhovens Dagblad (in Dutch)
- P. Kroon, De joodse gemeenschap van Eindhoven 1940-1945 (The Jewish community of Eindhoven 1940-1945), 2003
