= Flevopark =

Park in Amsterdam

Coordinates: 52°21′40″N 4°56′57″E

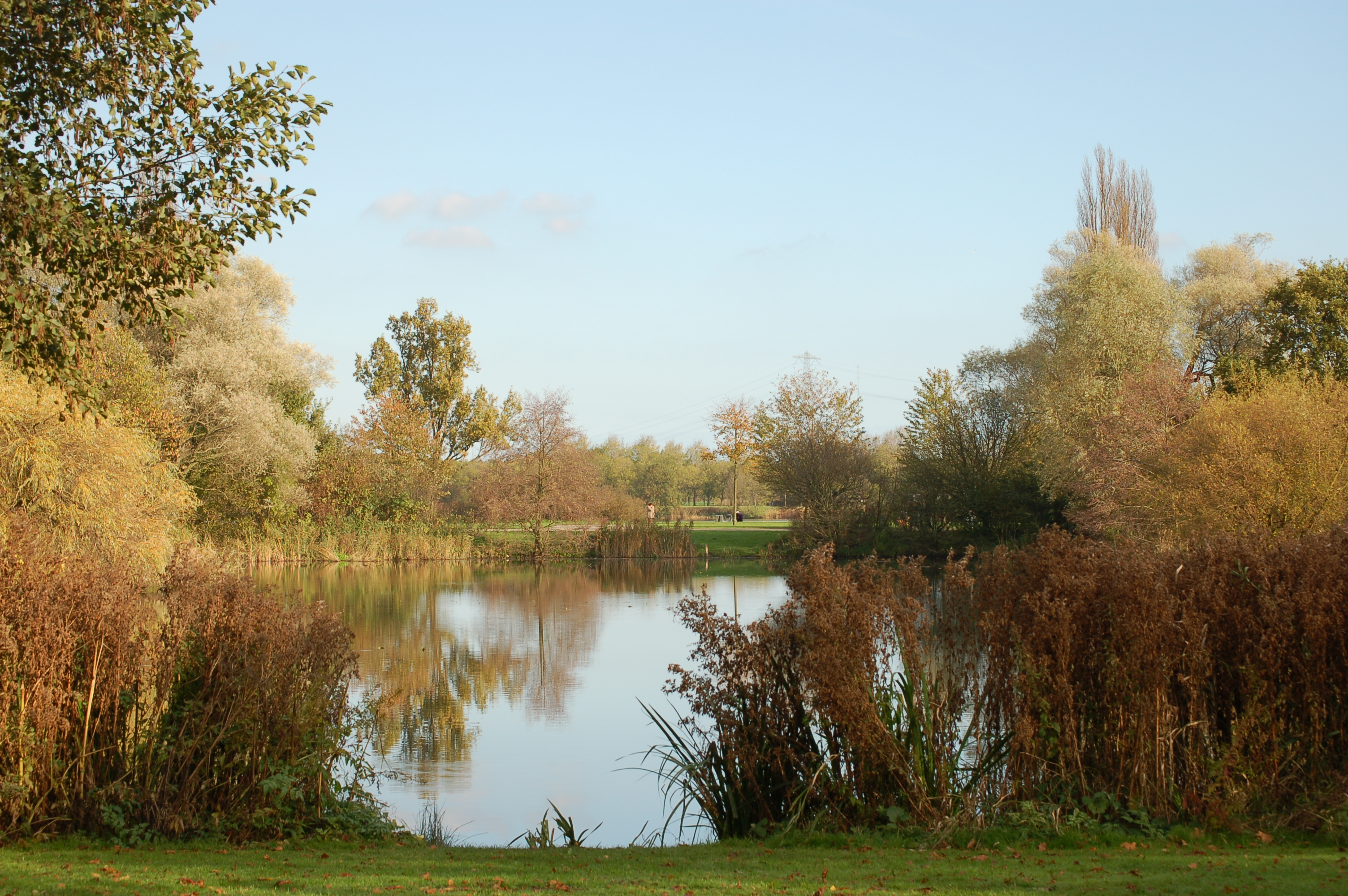
- Grote Plas
- Type: Urban park
- Location: Amsterdam, Netherlands
- Open: All year
- Website: Official website

Flevopark is a park located in the Indische Buurt, in the eastern portion of the city of Amsterdam, in the province of North Holland, Netherlands.

The park contains a playground, tennis courts, the youth centre "Jeugdland", an outdoor swimming pool, large lawns, barbecue areas, a terrace and several trails for running. On the banks of the Nieuwe Diep is a distillery and tasting room.

== History ==
This park was given concrete form in 1908. The naturalist Jac. P. Thijsse envisioned a park between the Jewish Cemetery and the Nieuwe Diep.

The expropriation procedure began in 1914, and from 1921 there was money available to obtain the land suitable for building the park. In 1928, the construction of the park began. The park officially opened in 1931.

In 1956 a large part of the adjacent Jewish Cemetery Zeeburg was relocated to the Jewish Cemetery of Diemen because of the construction of a road. The other part was sold to the Amsterdam municipality and added to the park.
