= Nederlands Israëlitisch Kerkgenootschap =

Dutch Jewish organisation

The Nederlands-Israëlitisch Kerkgenootschap (English: Dutch Israelite Religious Community) (NIK) is the umbrella organisation for most Ashkenazi Jewish communities in the Netherlands, and is Orthodox in nature, described as traditional in outlook. The expression Orthodox, is for the Dutch situation at least, of a later date than the existence of the congregations that make up the NIK and the NIK itself. The Chief Rabbi of the NIK is Rabbi Dr. Raphael Evers. In total, the NIK has some 20 rabbis actively working in 18 congregations throughout the country, serving some 5,000 Jews.

== History ==
=== 19th century ===
The NIK was founded in 1814 under the reign of Willem I, although the first steps towards a central organisation of Jewish communities in the Netherlands (which was the initial purpose of the NIK) were already taken in 1808, under command of Napoleon. The NIK was to form an umbrella over the existing Jewish communities. The NIK and its member-congregations maintained the traditional view on Judaism as it had been ever since and kept on going along this line, till today. Both the Ashkenazi and Sephardic communities were included. The newly found umbrella organisation had a clear hierarchical design: the Jewish communities were governed on a local level by twelve so-called large "hoofdsynagogen" (lit.: head synagogues), which had the power over the medium-sized synagogues (communities), which themselves had power over the smallest synagogues (called "bijkerken", like small Jewish communities on the Dutch countryside). Of the twelve "hoofdsynagogen", two were located in Amsterdam (Ashkenazi and Sephardic), two in The Hague (Ashkenazi and Sephardic), and one each in Rotterdam, Amersfoort, Middelburg, Den Bosch, Nijmegen, Zwolle, Leeuwarden and Groningen (all Ashkenazi, at that time called "Hoogduits", lit. "High German"). Two years later, another two were included: one in Maastricht, and one in Brussels (at that time Belgium was part of the Kingdom of the Netherlands).

This form of structuring the Jewish community in the Netherlands gave a lot of power to the (chief) rabbis, as they were given the power to govern the entire community. With the new constitution in 1848 however, things changed. In its first step to a fully secular state, the government decided towards a separation of Church and State. This banned rabbis from any administrative role whatsoever.

1871 saw new regulations for the organisation. The Sephardic communities left the NIK to form the Portugees-Israëlitisch Kerkgenootschap, gaining full independence within the Jewish community again as they had had in the centuries preceding the NIK. The NIK became thus fully Ashkenazi.

The NIK saw its height in 1877 when it administered over some 176 Jewish communities throughout the Netherlands. The following decades saw a steady decline, administrating 139 communities on the eve of World War II.

=== 20th century ===
The Holocaust destroyed most of the congregations, as at least 105,000 out of a total of 140,000 Dutch Jews were killed by the Nazis between 1940 and 1945.

=== 21st century ===
The NIK has some 20 rabbis governing some 36 Jewish communities or some 5,000 Jews and giving chaplaincy in the armed forces and to Jewish inmates. This makes them the largest Jewish religious organisation in the Netherlands. The NIK follows the rules of Orthodox Judaism, meaning among other things a separation between men and women during religious services and only accepting members who are halakhically Jewish. Despite the fact that the NIK follows the rules of Orthodox Judaism, most members do not consider themselves to be Orthodox Jews; thus making the NIK an organisation with a traditional Jewish outlook.

Main rabbi for the NIK is Rabbi Dr. Raphael Evers, who serves by large as the face of the organisation in the media, representing the Jewish voice and opinion.

Along with the larger Jewish communities, the NIK is responsible for supervising whether the rules for kashrut are followed, as well as the mikvaot (ritual baths), the upkeep of some two-hundred Jewish cemeteries in the Netherlands (on a national total of two-hundred-and-fifty) and (Orthodox) conversions to Judaism by non-Jews. The NIK also functions as a Jewish book publisher for the rather small Dutch language, bringing a variety of books with Jewish content to the Dutch-reading public, a.o. translated Torah, prayerbooks, part of the Mishna, Kitsur Shulchan Aruch, manuals for Jewish daily life and a successful structured plan for Jewish education to children from 4 years old and on to over 13 years. Part of the NIK is the Nederlands Israëlietisch Seminarium, the Jewish seminary, a state-recognized educational institution, which educates for Jewish teacher and rabbi. Four times a year the NIK publishes Hakehillot, a magazine for the Jews in the Netherlands, whilst it maintains a weekly updated news site and e-letter too.

== Congregations ==
=== Current ===
Congregations are called Nederlands Israëlietische Gemeente (NIG) or Joodse Gemeente. They exist in the following places:

- Almere. The NIG Almere was founded on 5 January 1997, making it the youngest NIK-Jewish community in the country. Rabbi for the community is rabbi Moshe Stiefel, who also has plans to start a community in Lelystad, the capital of Flevoland province. Because of its proximity to Amsterdam, with more than 15,000 Jews the center of Jewish life in the Netherlands, Jewish Almere is steadily growing. A Jewish cemetery for the community was inaugurated in January 2004.
- Amersfoort. The Jewish community in Amersfoort is currently one of the biggest outside of Amsterdam. Jewish life in Amersfoort started in the 17th century when Sephardic Jews settled inside the city. At the beginning of the 18th century, they were joined by Ashkenazi Jews, and built the Amersfort synagogue. The community grew to some 400 members in 1930. A large number of them managed to go into hiding at the beginning of the Second World War. The community was re-established in 1945, and had some 230 members in the first two decades after the war, diminishing to some 130 at the end of the 20th century. Nevertheless, the community still thrives. Amersfoort is the residence of Rabbi Binyomin Jacobs, who serves as the main religious leader for the Jewish communities outside of Amsterdam, Rotterdam, The Hague, and Leiden. Amersfoort is also home to the Sinai Center for Jewish Mental Health.
- Amsterdam.
- Breda. The Jewish community in Breda numbers some 60 members, spread over the western part of the province of North Brabant. Jewish life officially started in 1803, and grew fast, numbering 230 persons in 1840 and 284 in 1899. This eventually declined to 181 persons in 1930. Approximately one of three Breda Jews survived the Holocaust. Jewish life restarted again after the war, and now Breda still boosts a lifely community, which has its own library and magazine.
- Bussum. At the beginning of the 20th century, Bussum saw the rise of a Jewish community. Religious services were first held in Bussum in 1911. The community grew strong in the years following, reaching 341 members in 1930. After that, the community grew even more due to the influx of dozens of German-Jewish refugees. Approximately half of the Jews in Bussum were killed in the Nazi concentration camps during the Second World War. After the war Jewish life was restored and managed to flourish, with more than 200 people part of the community up until the 1970s. This number diminished slightly to some 150 members at the eve of the 21st century, making it one of the bigger Jewish communities in the Netherlands outside of Amsterdam (home to 15,000 Jews).

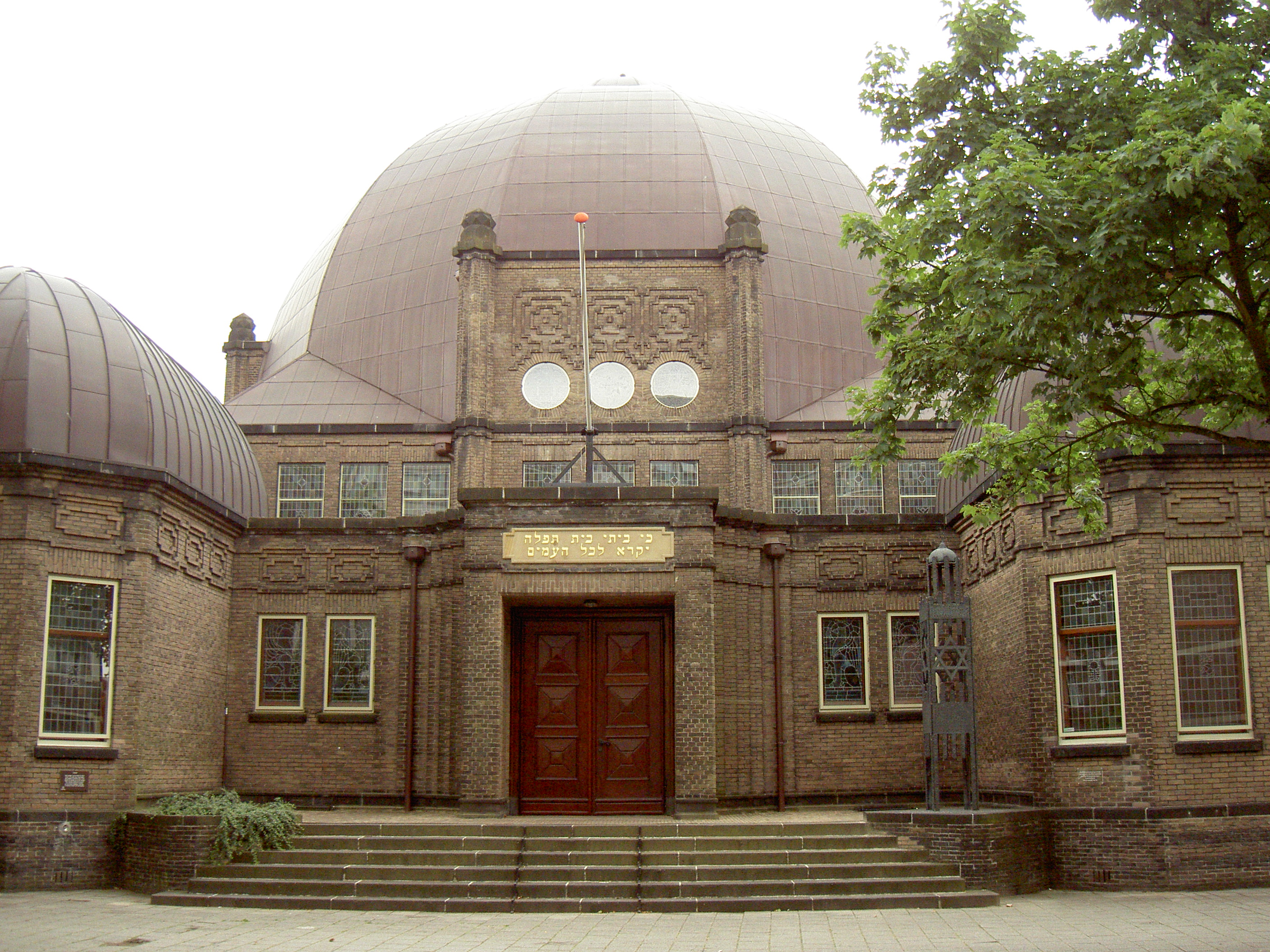
The synagogue in the city of Enschede, inaugurated by the Jewish community in 1928.

- Enschede The 17th century saw the first arrival of Jews in Enschede. The community grew due to the existence of industry in and around the city, and there were more than 1,400 Jews living in the city in 1941. Although the community was hit hard during the war, 395 Jews were still left in or returned to the city in June 1945. The first few years saw a strong Jewish community of some 300 persons resurfacing in the city. However, due to migration, aging, assimilation, and secularization, the community dwindled to some 70 members in 2006. The NIG communities in Hengelo and Almelo merged with the NIG community in Enschede in June 2006 to form the NIG Twente, Twente being the region around Enschede. August 2007 saw the appointment of a new rabbi within the community, rabbi Eliahoe Aharon Philipson, after rabbi Dov I. Salzmann, the previous rabbi, being the first post-Holocaust rabbi, retired and returned to his hometown Rehovot in Israel.
- Groningen
- Haarlem. Since the end of the 20th century being led by the dynamic rabbi Shmuel Spiero and since then one of the faster-growing communities.
- The Hague
- Leeuwarden. Jewish life in Leeuwarden flourished in the second part of the 19th century when the community numbered some 1,200 persons. This declined to 750 in the 1930s. The Holocaust saw the destruction of the once vibrant community. In 1951 the community had some 139 members; nowadays some 50 people are part of the congregation. In 1980 new synagogue was inaugurated in the former rabbi's residence, after the pre-war synagogue proved to be too big for the declining community. At the beginning of the 21st century, the local community managed to hold a weekly course in Talmud.
- Leiden. Having the oldest university in the Netherlands, Leiden has for a long time attracted a large number of students, including many Jews. In the 17th and 18th century, most of them were of Sefardic origin; later on, the community became predominantly Ashkenazi. The community saw its height in the middle of the 19th century, numbering more than 500 persons. In 1930 the community had declined to some 340 persons. The Holocaust severely affected Jewish life in Leiden but did not destroy it. In 1998, some 100 persons were part of the NIG Leiden. Among them is a large number of (non-Dutch) students. Leiden is also the home of the Joods Studiecentrum (Jewish Center of Learning) established in 1983 to accommodate the growing interest in the Netherlands among Jews and non-Jews in learning more about Judaism.
- Maastricht. The congregation in Maastricht is led by Rabbi Yaakov Y. Schapiro, an American, affiliated to the Chabad movement. The community was formed in the 1980s when several communities throughout the province of Limburg joined to form one congregation in Maastricht. Shabbath services are held on a weekly basis. Kosher food in Maastricht is available since the rabbi's arrival.
- Middelburg. The NIG congregation in Middelburg is part of a congregation that compromises the entire province of Zeeland. It numbers some 40 active members, most of them concentrated around Middelburg and Vlissingen. The Holocaust saw the destruction of the old Jewish community of Middelburg, but eventually, after 50 years, a new synagogue was inaugurated in November 1994. On 30 June 2004, a Jewish marriage took place at the synagogue, the first one in Middelburg since the start of World War II in 1940.
- Nijmegen. The Jewish community in Nijmegen was once the biggest and oldest Jewish community in the Netherlands, already in existence in the first part of the 14th century. The community was destroyed in 1349 after accusations that Jews had spread the Black Plague, but several Jews resettled in the town again already in 1386. This community lasted some 100 years. At the beginning of the 17th century, Jewish life was again established. The community grew to some 530 persons in 1940. In the five years following, however, the community was largely destroyed by the Nazis. This didn't prevent the survivors from restarting the community again after the war had ended. In 2000, the community returned to its original 17th-century synagogue and left the 19th-century building adjacent to what was once the synagogue. The Jewish community is growing since the move to the ancient synagogue, attracting new interested Jewish people. It holds services and all kinds of cultural, social and religious events.

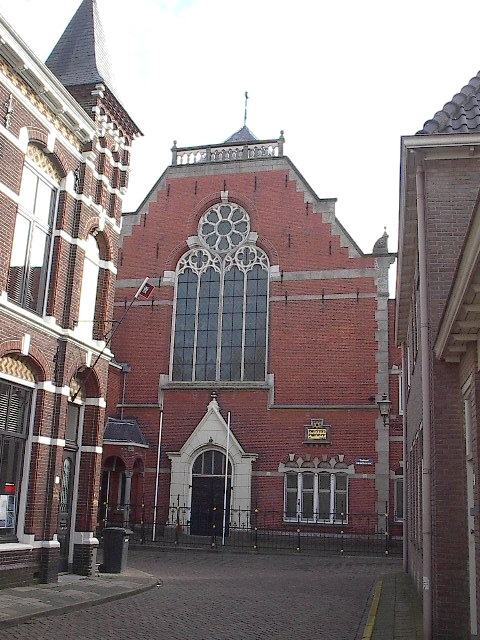
The synagogue in the city of Zwolle.

- Rotterdam. The history of the Jewish community in Rotterdam starts at the beginning of the 17th century, with the arrival of several Sephardic traders settling in this port city. The community grows slowly. From 1650 onwards, several Ashkenazi Jews, fleeing persecution in Poland and Germany, also settle in Rotterdam. With the growth of the city, the Jewish community grows as well, numbering some 2,500 at the end of the 18th century, making it the second-largest Jewish community in the Netherlands after Amsterdam. Up until the 1930s, the community grew even further, numbering almost 11,000 at the beginning of the Second World War. The Holocaust put a stop to the flourishing Jewish life in the town; no more than 13% of the Rotterdam Jews survives. In the 1950s, a community numbering some 800 persons (no more than 7% of the pre-war number) revitalises Jewish life again. Besides the existing NIK congregation, another Jewish congregation is formed, this one not modern Orthodox but Liberal in form, aligned to the NVPJ. The NIK community is nowadays the second-largest NIK congregation in the Netherlands (Amsterdam is the largest), led by rabbi Jehoeda Vorst.
- Utrecht
- Zutphen. While there were already Jews living in Zutphen during the Middle Ages, strong growth of the Jewish community only started at the end of the 18th century. Many of them came from Germany. The community reached the number of 600 persons in 1875. In 1930, the community still numbered 532 persons. The Holocaust had a devastating effect on Jewish life, with only some 60 Jews surviving the war. This didn't prevent Jewish life from resurfacing again. In 2000, the community merged with the Jewish communities of Apeldoorn and Deventer to form the De Stedendriehoek NIG Services are held at the synagogue of Zutphen, while some are also occasionally held at the synagogue of Apeldoorn.
- Zwolle. Numbering some 600 in the 1930s, and 800 in 1940 (among them 121 foreign Jews), the Jews of Zwolle suffered tremendously during the Holocaust, with only 240 of them managing to survive by going into hiding or coming back alive from the Nazi concentration camps. Jewish life picked up again after the war had ended, and there is currently a small but active community, making extensive use of the city's synagogue.

=== Communities that closed or merged any time after WWII ===
- Aalten. The once lively Jewish community of the small town of Aalten numbered more than 100 Jews around 1840. In the following decades, the number of Jews declined to some 70 at the eve of World War II. Around half of the Jewish community perished during the Holocaust. After the war, some 46 Jews returned to the small town, but eventually, many emigrated, either to the larger Jewish communities still functioning in the Netherlands (like Amsterdam), or to countries like the United States of America and Israel.
- Alkmaar. The Jewish community in Alkmaar numbers some 70 people, down from some 200 in the 1930s. It celebrated its 400th-year anniversary on 9 May 2004.
- Eindhoven
- Den Bosch. The 13th and 14th centuries saw the first accounts of Jews settling in Den Bosch. The community grew after the emancipation degrees which equalized the position of Jews within Dutch society. There were some 500 Jews living in Den Bosch at the beginning of the Second World War; 200 of them managed to survive. Jewish life continued after the war, but weekly services stopped in the 1970s due to the declining number of community members. For a while, services on the High Holy Days were still held.
- Deventer. See for more information the section on Zutphen (see below).
- Doetinchem. The first Jews settled in Doetinchem during the 17th century. The community reached a high around 1900 when some 260 Jews were living in this Gelderland town. There were some 160 Jews living in Doetinchem in the 1930s. A few dozen Doetinchem Jews managed to survive the Second World War by going into hiding; the rest was murdered in the Nazi concentration camps. After the war several Jewish communities were merged with the one in Doetinchem to become the NIG De Achterhoek, the Achterhoek being the name for the region where Doetinchem is part of. From right after the Holocaust there is no synagogue in Doetinchem anymore.
- Dordrecht. Merged into Rotterdam.
- Hilversum. Jewish life in Hilversum dates back to the beginning of the 18th century. There soon existed a flourishing community, which would number some 1,000 members in the 1930s. This increased to some 1,400 during the first year of the Second World War, when German-Jewish refugees in the Netherlands were forcibly resettled in Hilversum as well as other towns and cities throughout the country. Hilversum was hit hard by the Holocaust: no more than 10% of its Jewish inhabitants survived the war. Despite that, Jewish life in Hilversum flourished in the 1950s and 1960s, with some 200 Jews attending synagogue and participating in the Hilversum kehillah. After that numbers dwindled. In 1990 the Rabbinate for the rural communities (IPOR) settled in Hilversum. The Hilversum community merged into the one in Bussum.
- Emmen. The synagogue in Emmen functioned as the place of worship for the NIG Drenthe, the kehilla for Drenthe province. Emmen had some 180 Jewish inhabitants in 1930, of which several dozen managed to survive. The Jewish communities of Assen, Emmen and Hoogeveen merged in 1988 to form the NIG Drenthe.
- Oss. The Jewish community in Oss experienced its height in the 1930s when the community consisted of almost 300 people. The Holocaust, however, had a devastating effect, with most of the Jewish community being deported to the Nazi concentration camps in 1942. Nowadays, the number of Jews in Oss is estimated at some 30 persons. Founders of some of today's well-known companies belonged to the Jewish community in Oss; like Unilever, Bergos, AKZO, Organon.* Tilburg. Merged into Breda.
- Winterswijk. Although the Jewish community in Winterswijk suffered severely during the Second World War, community life was re-established in 1951 with the re-inauguration of the synagogue present in this small town in the eastern part of the Netherlands. At that time, the community numbered no more than 30 people. In the years following, however, the community stayed relatively stable, numbering approximately 22 members in 1998. Services are held only on an incidental basis though.
- Zaandam

== Gallery ==
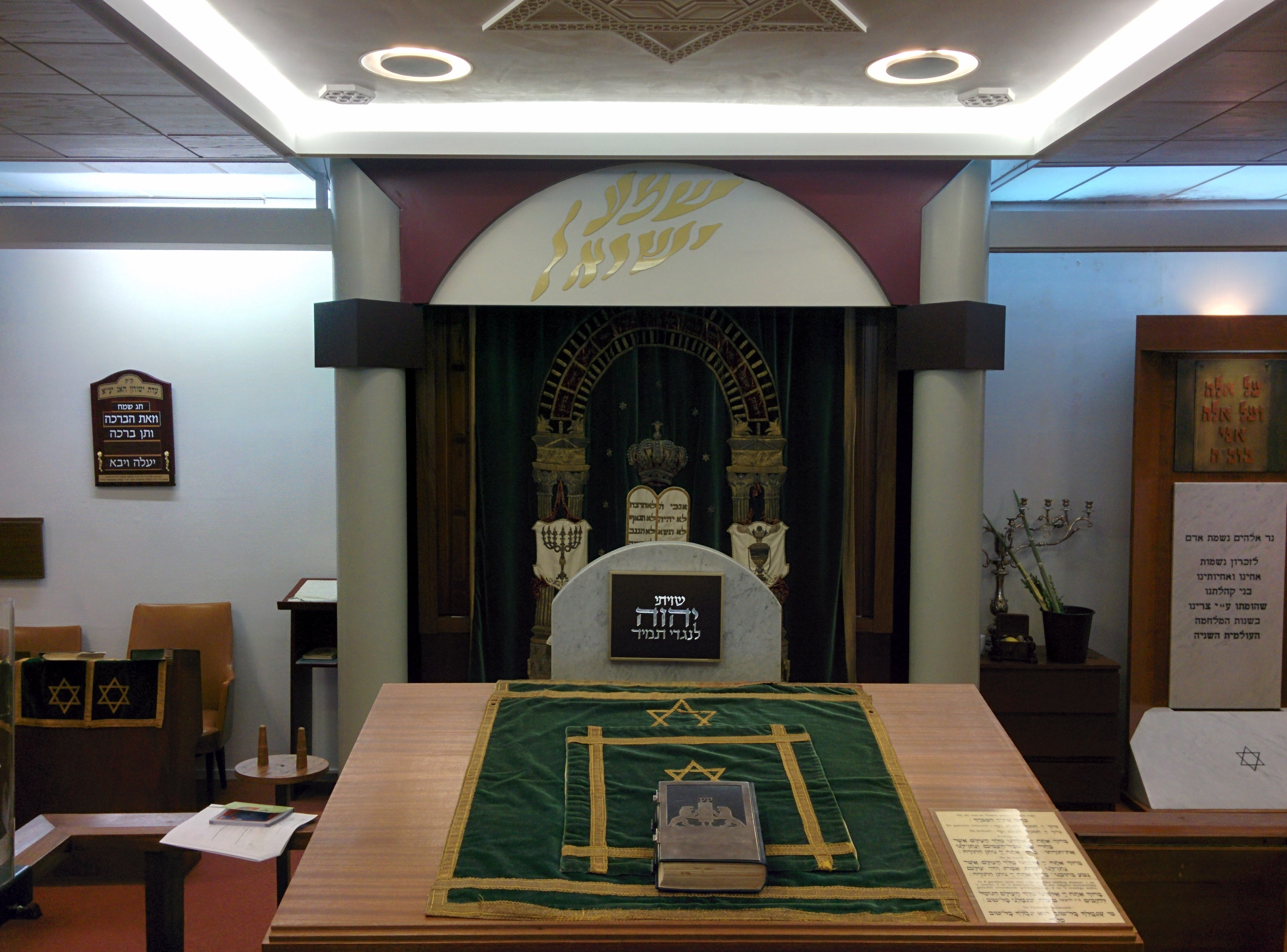
NIG Synagogue in The Hague
