= Synagoge (Amersfoort) =

Coordinates: 52°09′16″N 5°23′27″E

Amersfoort synagoge is a synagogue in Amersfoort, Netherlands.
