= Nederlands Verbond voor Progressief Jodendom =

Verbond voor Progressief Jodendom
- Theology: Reform Judaism
- Rabbinic college chair: Rabbi Meno ten Brink
- Chair: Ron van der Wieken
- Associations: World Union for Progressive Judaism
- Region: Netherlands
- Headquarters: Zuidelijke Wandelweg 41, Amsterdam
- Origin: 18 October 1931
- Congregations: 10
- Members: ~3,700
- Official website: www.verbond.eu

The Nederlands Verbond voor Progressief Jodendom (Dutch Union for Progressive Judaism; until 2006: Verbond voor Liberaal-Religieuze Joden in Nederland, Union for Liberal-Religious Jews in the Netherlands) is the umbrella organisation for Progressive Jews in the Netherlands, and is affiliated to the World Union for Progressive Judaism. It was founded in 1931.

The "Verbond" claims a membership of some 3,700, spread in ten different congregations throughout the country. The biggest one is the congregation in Amsterdam, with some 1,700 members. Other congregations exist in The Hague, Rotterdam, Culemborg (PJG Midden-Nederland),Utrecht, Arnhem (LJG Gelderland), Tilburg (LJG Brabant), Enschede (LJG Twente), Heerenveen, Zuidlaren (LJG Noord-Nederland) and Almere (LJG Flevoland). The NVPJ's rabbis are: Menno ten Brink, David Lilienthal, Awraham Soetendorp, Edward van Voolen, Marianne van Praag, Tamara Benima, Albert Ringer and Peter Luijendijk. It publishes its own magazine three times a year, Joods Nu (lit. Jewish Now).

The Nederlands Verbond voor Progressief Jodendom has separate organisations for women (FLJVN) and youngsters (Netzer Holland); there is also a separate Zionist organisation based on Progressive Jewish grounds, ARZA. It is also connected to four Jewish cemeteries: one in Hoofddorp (1937) and one in Amstelveen (2002). The Liberal communities in The Hague and Rotterdam also have their own cemetery in the town of Rijswijk, Beth Hachaim. The cemetery was founded in 1990 after several requests from members from both communities. The Congregation in Twente has its cemetery Gan ha-Olam in Enschede.

== History ==
Progressive Judaism was brought to the Netherlands in the 1930s by German immigrants, many of them fleeing Nazi persecution. The first Progressive rabbi in the Netherlands was Meir L. Lasker, followed by German-born Rabbi Norden. The first congregation was founded in 1931 in The Hague, in the same year followed by one in Amsterdam. The congregations grew rapidly throughout the years, mostly because of the arrival of thousands of German Jews (of whom most were part of the Reform tradition). On 18 October 1931, the Verbond van Liberaal-Godsdienstige Joden (lit. Union for Liberal-Religious Jews) was founded. Services were held regularly, and the Union published its own paper, Nieuw Joods Leven (lit. New Jewish Life).

At the eve of World War II, the Amsterdam community alone had some 900 members; ten years earlier, Progressive Judaism had virtually been non-existent in the Netherlands – the religious landscape was limited to Ashkenazi Orthodox Judaism and a smaller community of Sephardi Jews.

== The Holocaust ==
World War II saw the destruction of most of Jewish life in the Netherlands during the Holocaust; more than 75% of Dutch Jews were killed by the Nazis. But the community was vibrant, and small initiatives were started in the years after the Second World War to revitalize Jewish life again, although this was hard in a country where the Jewish community had diminished from more than 140,000 in 1940 to a mere 25,000 in the 1950s. A new Liberal community was started in Amsterdam in 1946; the community had some 50 members, only a fraction of the 900 six years earlier.

== 1945–2006 ==
It was not until the 1960s that Progressive Judaism started to grow once again in the Netherlands. Much of its success was related to the hard work of Rabbi Jacob Soetendorp, rabbi for the Liberal community in Amsterdam since 1954. Because of his hard work, new communities started to spring up again within the Jewish Netherlands – sometimes much to the disagreement of the Orthodox Jewish community in the Netherlands, combined in the Nederlands Israëlitisch Kerkgenootschap, which, until this day, does not fully recognize the Nederlands Verbond voor Progressief Jodendom.

The 1990s and the first years of the 21st century saw a new impulse to Progressive Judaism in the Netherlands with the establishment of three new communities: one in Utrecht in 1993; one in Heerenveen (Beth Hatsafon) in 2000; and one in Almere (Beth B'nei Jonah) in 2003.

== Levisson Instituut ==
The Levisson Instituut was founded in 2002 with the aim to provide rabbinical training for Dutch Jewish students affiliated with the NVPJ. The institute is based on the premises of the University of Amsterdam and receives educational assistance from the Leo Baeck College in London, amongst others. Currently, seven students are training at the Institute and are providing liturgical and pastoral support within the Liberal communities. Dean of Studies is Swedish-born Rabbi David Lilienthal.

== Overview ==
- LJG Amsterdam: 1,700 members, some 725 families. Rabbi for the community is Menno ten Brink. The synagogue of the community is located in the Jacob Soetendorpstraat since 1966. A new synagogue is in construction at the moment. As of October 2007 the community has been relocated from the Jacob Soetendorpstraat to the Stadionweg, awaiting its new synagogue to be inaugurated. The community was established on October 31, 1931; it celebrated its 75 year jubilee on October 26, 2006, with Queen Beatrix of the Netherlands as honorary guest. The community publishes a quarterly called "Kol Mokum", translated as "Voice of Amsterdam" or "Whole of Amsterdam" (Amsterdam is also known as Mokum, which comes from the Yiddish spoken by the first Jewish immigrants to the city and which is derived from the Hebrew word "Makom", which means "place" or "town"; Mokum is used both by Jews as well as non-Jews when referring to Amsterdam).
- LJG Rotterdam: Rabbi for the community is Albert Ringer. Founded in 1968 by rabbi Avraham Soetendorp, son of Jacob Soetendorp. A new synagogue was put into use on August 25, 1995.
- LJG The Hague Beth Jehoeda: some 325 families are members of congregation Beth Jehoeda, which makes it the second largest Liberal Jewish community in the Netherlands (after the one in Amsterdam). Although a community was established already in 1931 (the first Progressive Jewish congregation in the country), the Second World War meant a devastating blow to the community and it was not until 1962 before the community was re-established again with the finding of a new shelter in the Stadhouderslaan (the community was already informally re-established in the 1950s, but had no place for worship). In the years following however, plans were made to use the old Sephardic synagogue in The Hague (the Snoge) as a new shelter for the community. During the Second World War the Sephardic community in The Hague was completely destroyed, leaving the synagogue empty after the War. Eventually, on September 3, 1973, plans became reality when the synagogue was inaugurated as the new place of worship for the Liberal community in the presence of Queen Juliana of the Netherlands. Rabbi for the community is Marianne van Praag.
- LJG Gelderland, Kehillath Adath Jesjoeroen: more than 70 families are members of this congregation; rabbi for the community is Marianne van Praag. The community was established on February 14, 1965, in Arnhem. In 2010 the congregation moved to a newly restored synagogue in the nearby small town of Dieren, to give the community a place of worship.
- LJG Brabant Aree Hanegev: founded in 1981 in Tilburg, Aree Hanegev attracts Liberal Jews from the provinces of North Brabant, Limburg and Zeeland, as well as from Flanders. Rabbi for the community is Corrie Zeidler.
- LJG Utrecht: the community was established on December 7, 1993. Rabbi for the community is Nava Tehilah Livingstone-Shmuelit. The congregation has had its own synagogue since the end of 2004.
- LJG Twente Or Chadasj: this community was established in 1972 in the city of Enschede. Rabbi for the community is Albert Ringer. Its synagogue, built in 1828, is situated in Haaksbergen. The congregation owns her own cemetery in Enschede.
- Progressief Joodse Gemeente Midden-Nederland (PJGMN: this community was established in 2020 in the city of Culemborg. Rabbi for the community is Peter Luijendijk. The former synagogue is now owned by Dutch Reformed Church Culemborg.
- PJG Noord-Nederland Beth Hatsafon: in 1997 house meetings were first started. In 1998, this group adopted the name "Liberaal Joods Lernminjan Noord Nederland" (Liberal Jewish Lernminjan Northern Netherlands); meetings were held in the village of Goutum. In 1999 the group changed its name to "Liberaal Joodse Vereniging Noord-Nederland" (Liberal Jewish Association Northern Netherlands). Eventually, in 2000, the group became part of the LJG and established its base in Heerenveen. The community now has some 36 members. Rabbi Tamara Benima is rabbi for the community. In May 2006, the community announced its plans to relocate the congregation to the small town of Zuidlaren, where they hire the old synagogue which was renovated; as of late 2007, services are held there. With the move came a name change, "Liberaal" was replaced by "Progressief".
- LJG Flevoland Beth b'nei Jonah: established in 2003, the community of Flevoland, located in Almere. The community is rapidly growing due to its proximity to Amsterdam, which harbors some 15,000 Jews. At the moment the community harbors some 16 members. Rabbi for the community is Marianne van Praag.
- LJG Heerenveen “Tsliliem Chadasjiem”: split in 2004 from Beth HaTsafon, became on 1 March 2007 the association “Beth haChidoesj haTsfoni”, an independent Jewish community, which in 2009 contacted the NVPJ, which it joined in December 2010 as its 10th recognized community. Its rabbi is Tamara Benima.
