= Jan Bank =

Dutch historian

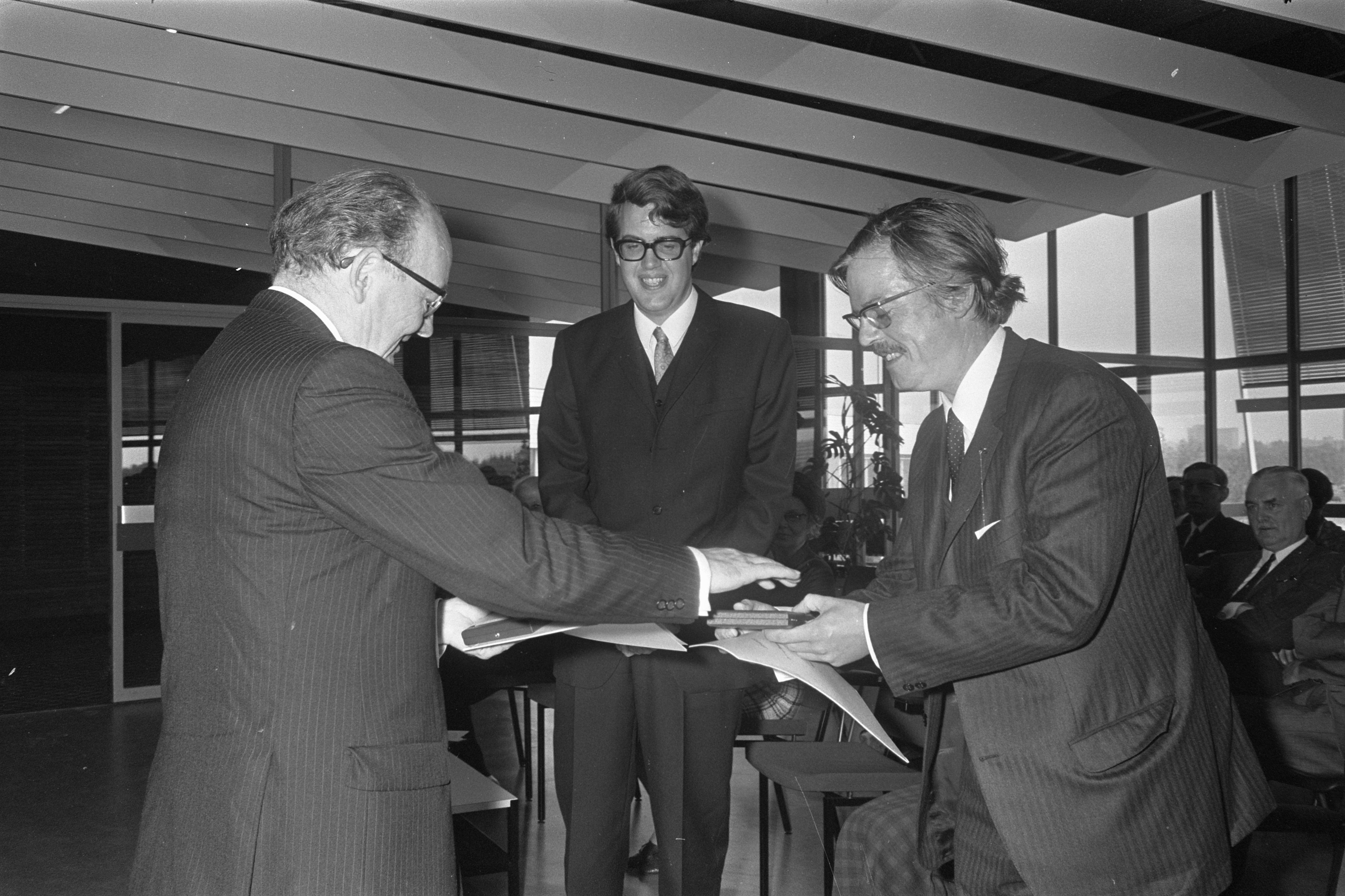
Left to right: Harry Janssen, Jan Bank & Ferd. Rondagh (1970)

Joannes Theodorus Maria "Jan" Bank (born 10 May 1940 in Amsterdam) is a Dutch historian. He was one of the members of the independent committee assigned responsibility for the fourteenth and final volume of Loe de Jong's The Kingdom of the Netherlands During World War II.

Bank was a member of the municipal council of Amstelveen for the Labour Party (PvdA).
