= The Silent Historian =

- Film poster
- Dutch: Het zwijgen van Loe de Jong
- Directed by: Simonka de Jong
- Written by: Simonka de Jong
- Produced by: Jan de Ruiter; Niek Koppen; Anja Cloosterman
- Cinematography: Wiro Felix
- Edited by: Luce van de Weg
- Production company: Selfmade Films
- Release date: 8 January 2011
- Running time: 55 minutes
- Country: Netherlands
- Language: Dutch

The Silent Historian (Dutch: Het zwijgen van Loe de Jong; lit. 'The Silence of Loe de Jong') is a 2011 Dutch documentary film by Simonka de Jong, shown as part of the January 2012 New York Jewish Film Festival, presented in partnership with Jewish Museum and Film Society of Lincoln Center.

De Jong, a Dutch documentary filmmaker wrote and directed this inquiry into the life and motivations of her grandfather, Loe de Jong, a historian and television personality whose books and presentations regarding events in the Netherlands during World War II made him a celebrated national figure. After his death in 2005 at the age of nearly 91, the family discovered that Loe had been hiding letters and other personal documents concerning his twin brother, Sally, a self-sacrificing physician who died during the last months of the war. Sally’s two sons, Daan and Abel, both in their mid-sixties at the time of filming, who questioned their uncle many times in the past about his memories and relationship with their father, were left wondering what family secrets Loe had kept to himself.

Also included are clips from conversations and reminiscences which television presenters Ivo Niehe and Ischa Meijer conducted with Loe de Jong in the early 1990s. At one point, de Jong admits to Meijer that he considered his accomplished twin brother as a rival and was jealous of him, stating that, "I had a brother who was better than me, who had graduated with honors, who thought better".

The film examines family soul-searching, giving various relatives, including Loe's son, an opportunity for self-expression, and explores family misgivings and conflict over the revelations, with some relatives declining to speak on camera or participate in any manner. Daan and Abel, who were raised in foster homes, separate from one another, did not have an opportunity to bond with each other as youngsters or as brothers. Daan spent a difficult childhood and adolescence moving in and out of foster homes, while Abel was raised in a happier atmosphere, living with a rural family in the countryside. Daan feels that even though they were the sons of his own twin brother, their uncle contributed almost nothing to help them succeed in life. He has been insistent upon finding answers almost to the point of obsession, but Abel feels that the emotional toll of the lifelong preoccupation with their father's fate is so severe that, in the latter part of the documentary, he refuses to speak or to take any further part in the filming.

== See also ==
- History of the Jews in the Netherlands#The Holocaust
