= NIOD Institute for War, Holocaust and Genocide Studies =

Dutch World War II and genocide research organization

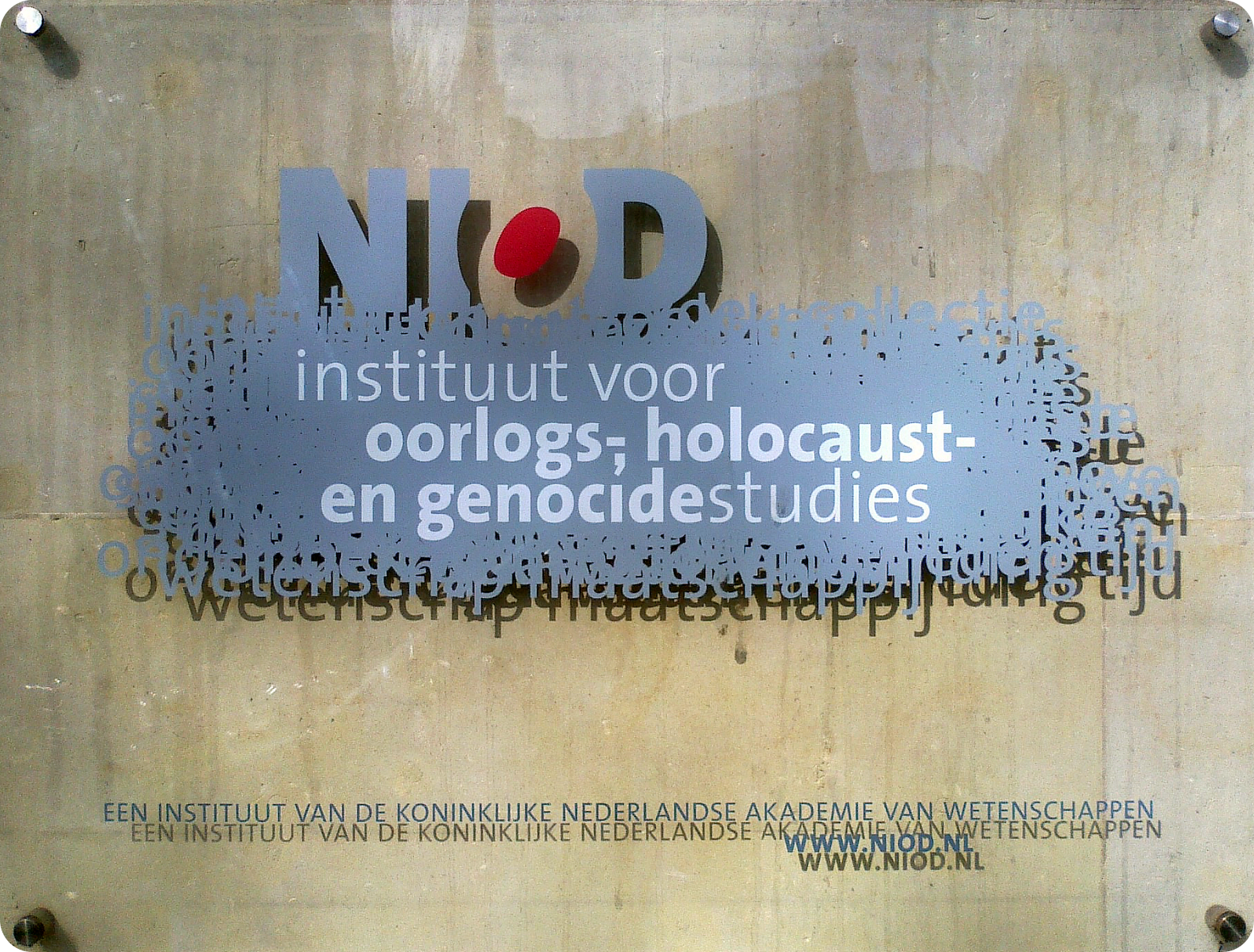
- Predecessor: Netherlands Institute for War Documentation; Center for Holocaust and Genocide Studies
- Formation: 8 May 1945
- Purpose: NIOD’s area of work covers the 20th and 21st century, with a focus on research into the effects of wars, the Holocaust and other genocides on individuals and society.
- Headquarters: Amsterdam
- Location: Netherlands
- Director: Prof. Dr. Martijn Eickhoff
- Staff: 58 (49.61 FTE) per 31 December 2014
- Website: www.niod.nl/en

The NIOD Institute for War, Holocaust and Genocide Studies (Dutch: NIOD Instituut voor Oorlogs-, Holocaust- en Genocidestudies) is an organisation in the Netherlands which maintains archives and carries out historical studies into the Second World War, the Holocaust and other genocides around the world, past and present. The institute was founded as a merger of the Netherlands Institute for War Documentation (Dutch: Nederlands instituut voor oorlogsdocumentatie, NIOD, formerly National Institute for War Documentation, Dutch: Rijksinstituut voor oorlogsdocumentatie, RIOD) and the Center for Holocaust and Genocide Studies (CHGS).

It has been part of the Royal Netherlands Academy of Arts and Sciences since 1 January 1999.

== Mission ==
According to its website, the NIOD Institute's mission is to:

Collect, manages, opens up and makes accessible archives and collections about the Second World War. Conduct academic research and publishes about it. Give information to government bodies and individual. Stimulate and organise debates and activities about war violence and processes that are at the basis of war violence.

It administers the archives of the German occupation of the Netherlands and the Japanese occupation of the Dutch East Indies, as well as large collections of clandestine newspapers and pamphlets, photographs, books and articles.

== Studies and publications ==
The institute published The Kingdom of the Netherlands During World War II (Dutch: Het Koninkrijk der Nederlanden in de Tweede Wereldoorlog) in fourteen volumes and 18,000 pages. This magnum opus of Loe de Jong is the standard reference on the history of the Netherlands during World War II. The NIOD had recently made an electronic edition of the entire work, available for downloading from 11 December 2011, licensed under creative commons CC BY 3.0.

It also performed a study into the Srebrenica massacre of 1995, which led to the report Srebrenica: a 'safe' area, which led to the resignation of the second cabinet of Wim Kok.

=== Other publications ===
- Post, Peter / Gijsbers, Harco: The Encyclopedia of Indonesia in the Pacific War. Publisher: Brill, Leiden/Boston, 2010. ISBN 9789004168664
- Withuis, Jolande / Mooij, Annet (eds.): The Politics of War Trauma, The Aftermath of World War II in Eleven European Countries. Publisher: Aksant, Amsterdam, 2010. ISBN 9789052603711
- Boender, Barbara / Haperen, Maria van / Üngör, Ugu: The Holocaust and other genocides. An introduction. Publisher: Amsterdam University Press, Amsterdam, 2012. ISBN 9789089643810
- Adler, Nanci: Keeping Faith with the Party: Communist Believers Return from the Gulag. Publisher: Indiana University Press, Bloomington, 2012. ISBN 9780253357229
- Keizer, Madelon de (ed.) / Bakker, Marjo (ed.) / Griffin, Roger (ed.): Fascism. Journal of Comparative Fascist Studies. Publisher: Brill, Leiden, 2012. ISSN 2211-6257

== Gallery ==
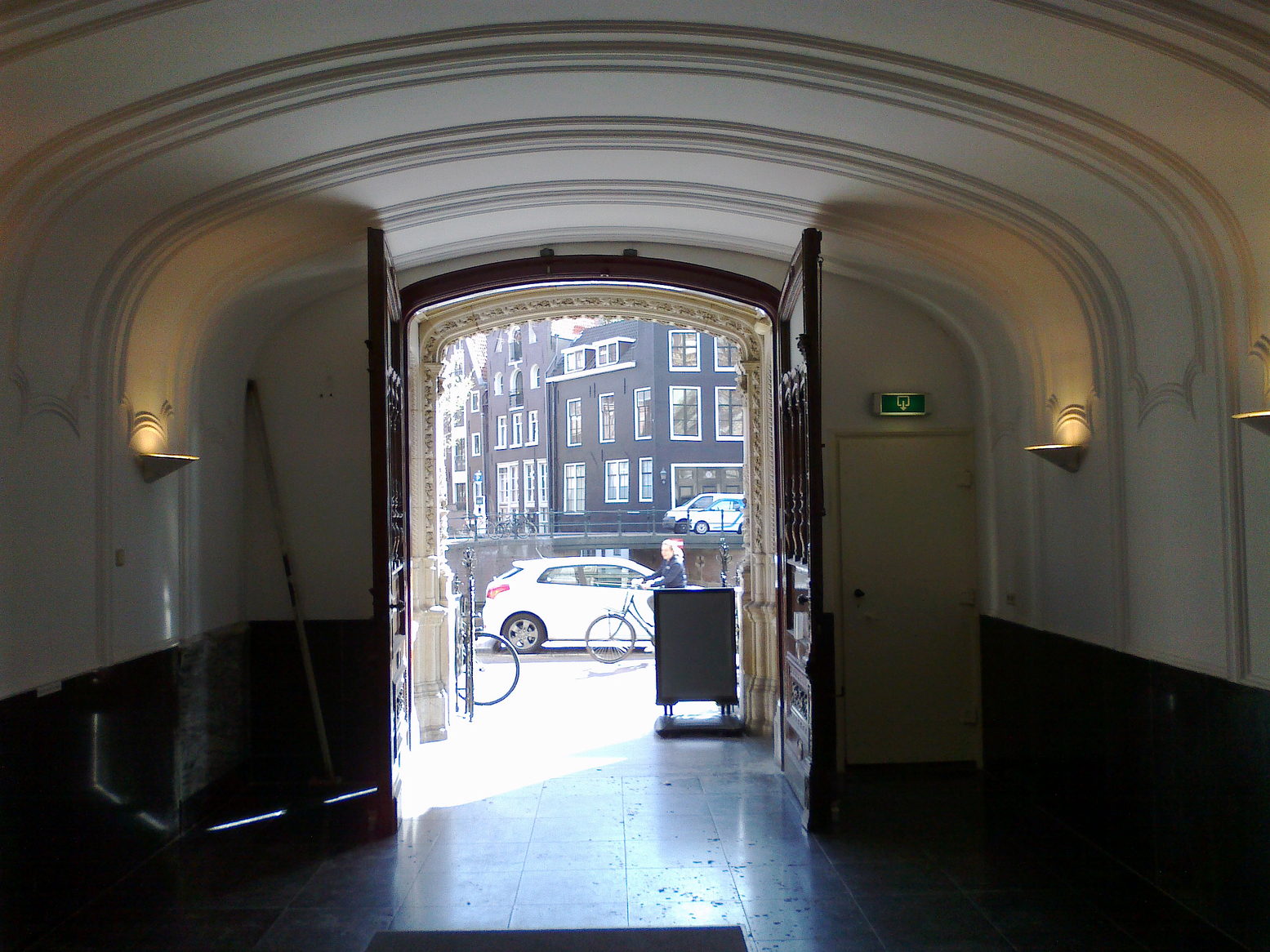

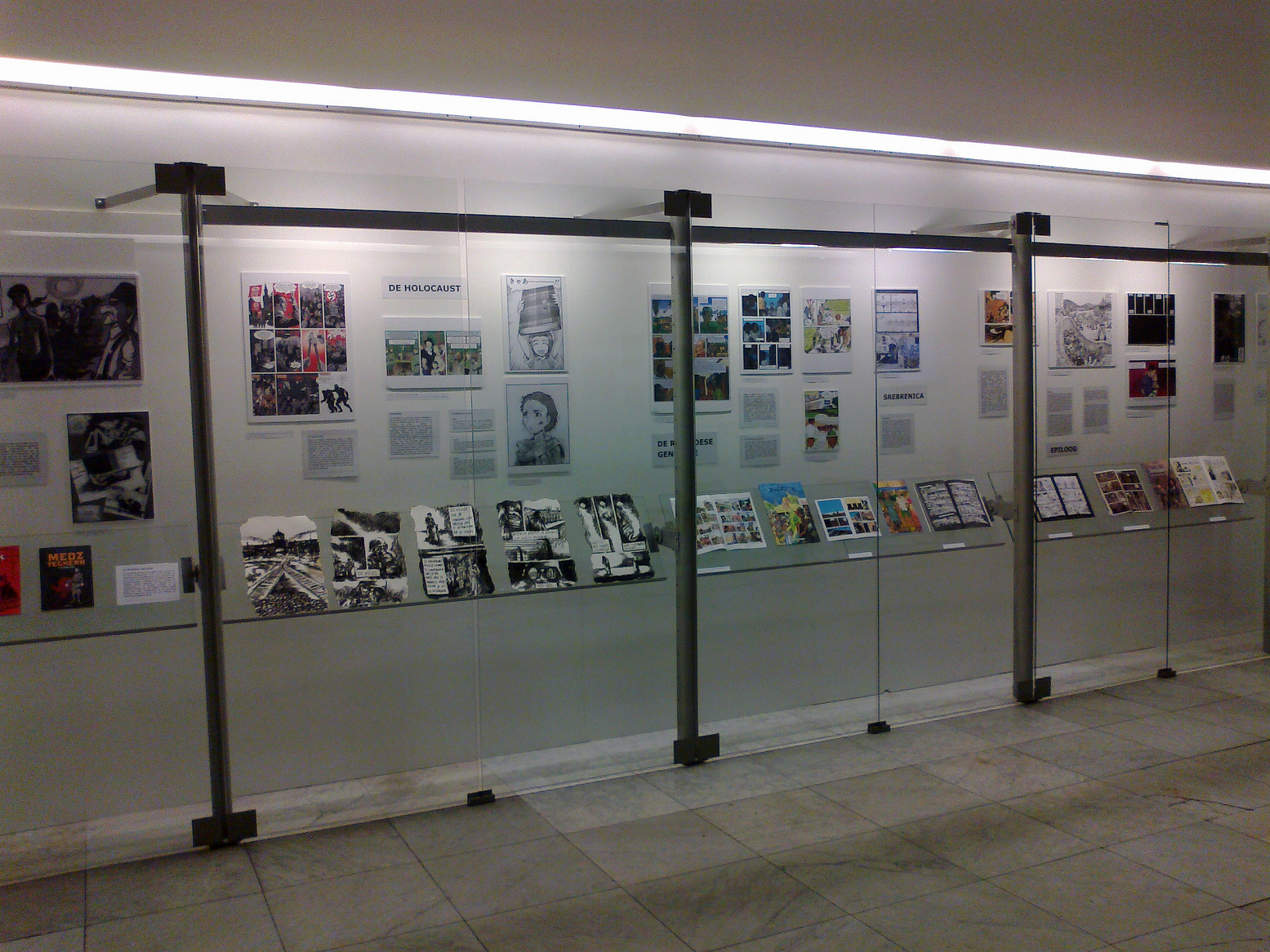

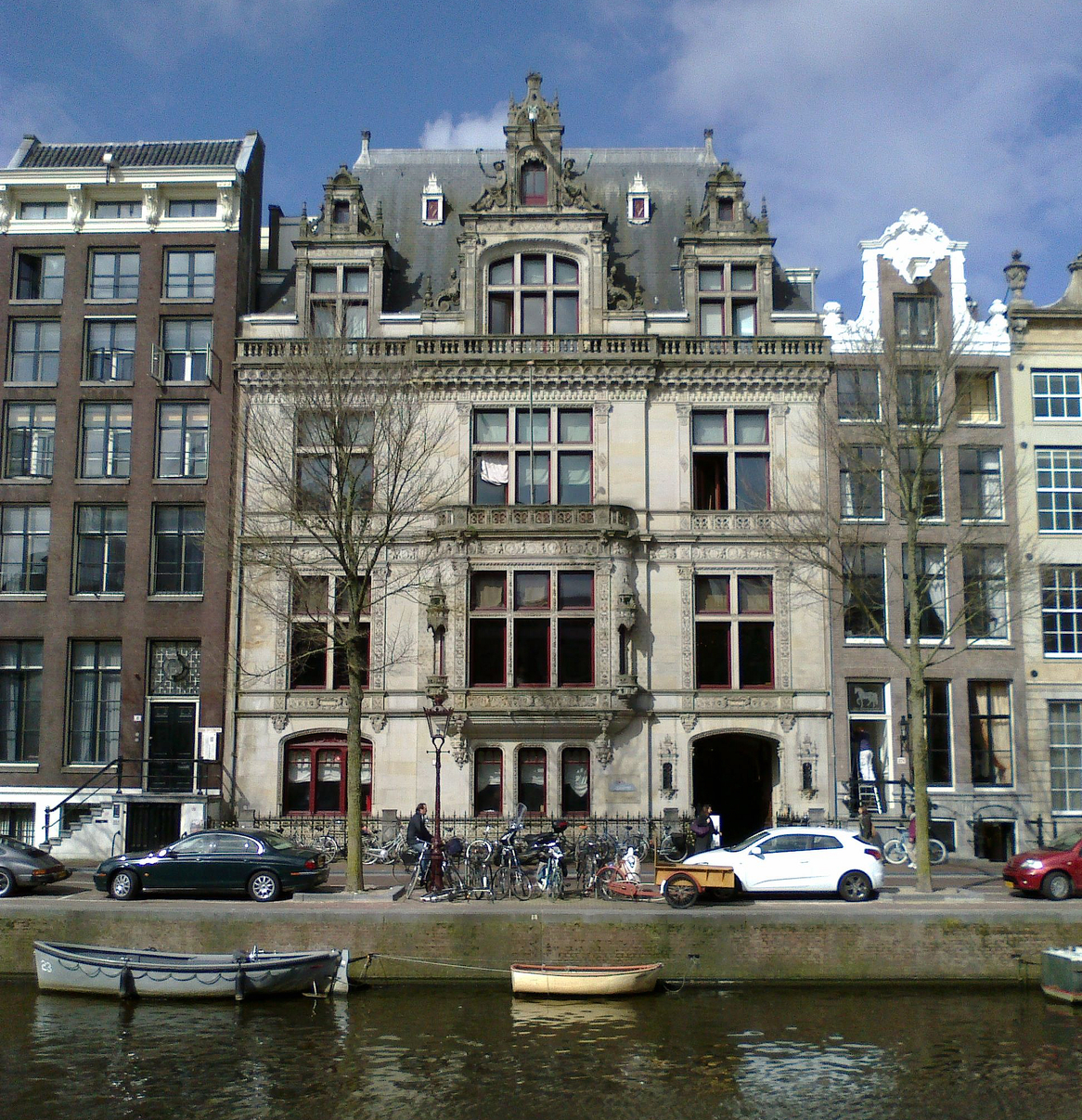

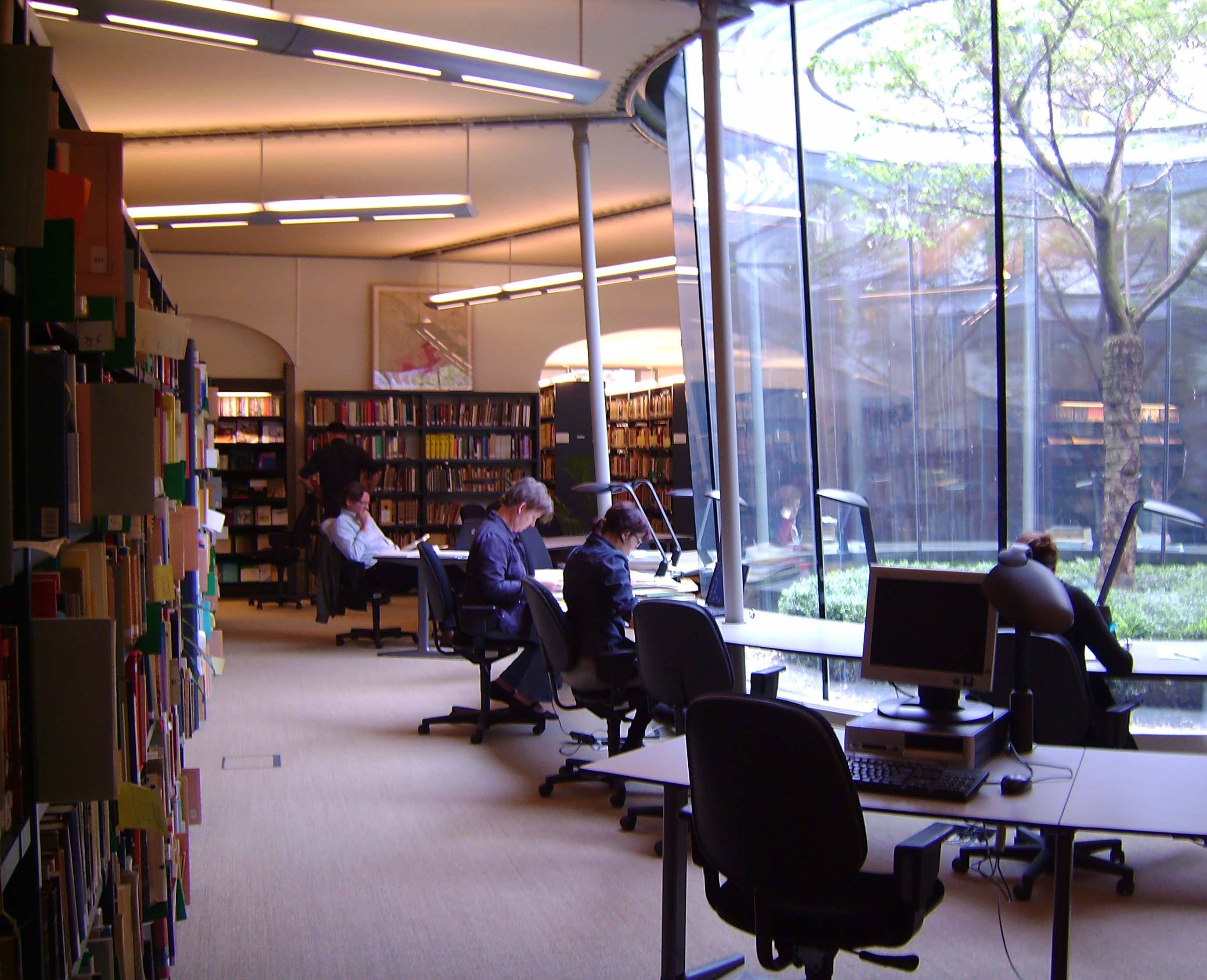

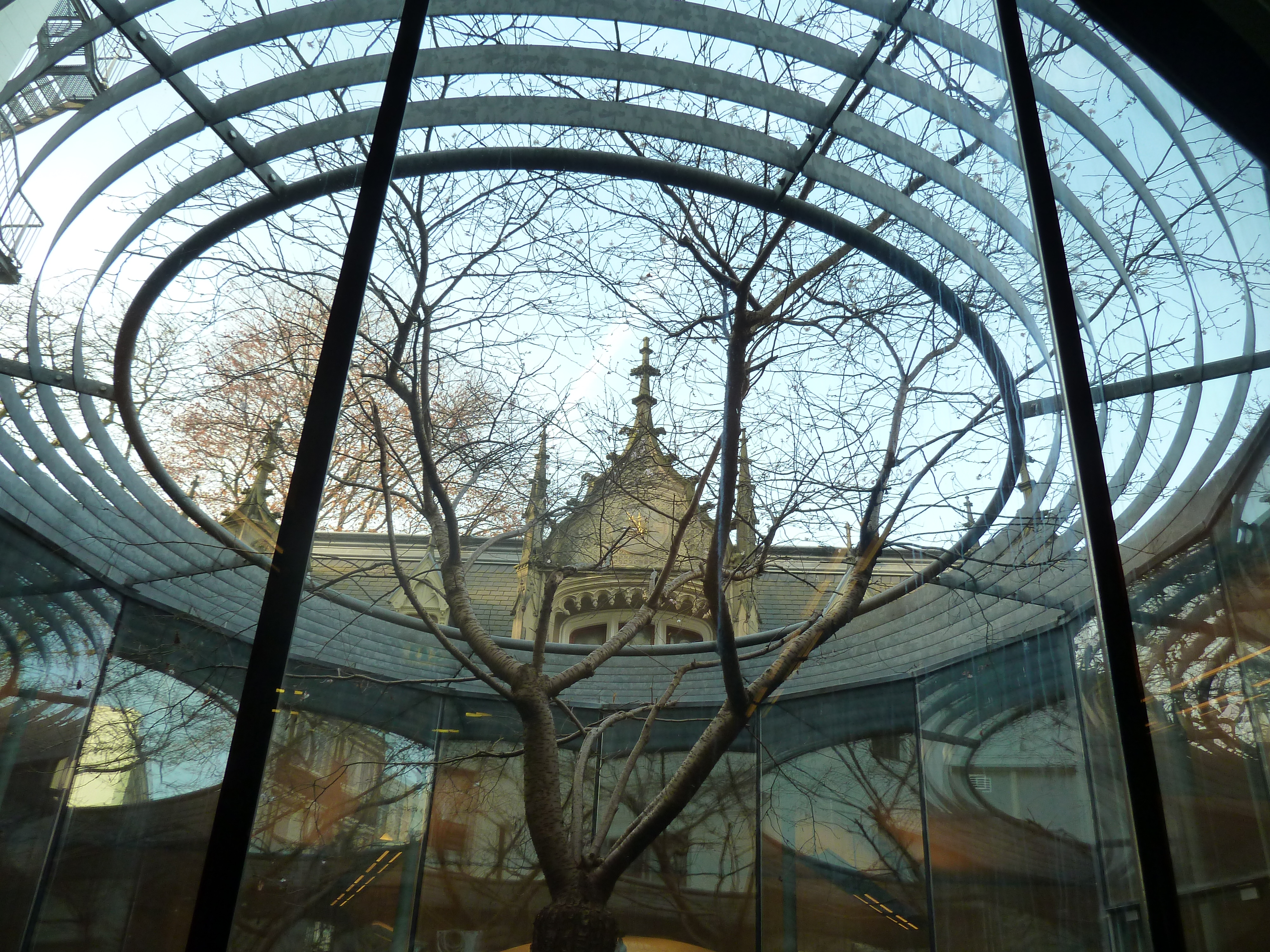

== See also ==
- Centre for Historical Research and Documentation on War and Contemporary Society - an equivalent institution in Belgium
- Dutch National Holocaust Museum
