= National Holocaust Names Memorial (Amsterdam) =

National Holocaust Names Memorial in Amsterdam, the Netherlands

- Holocaust Namenmonument
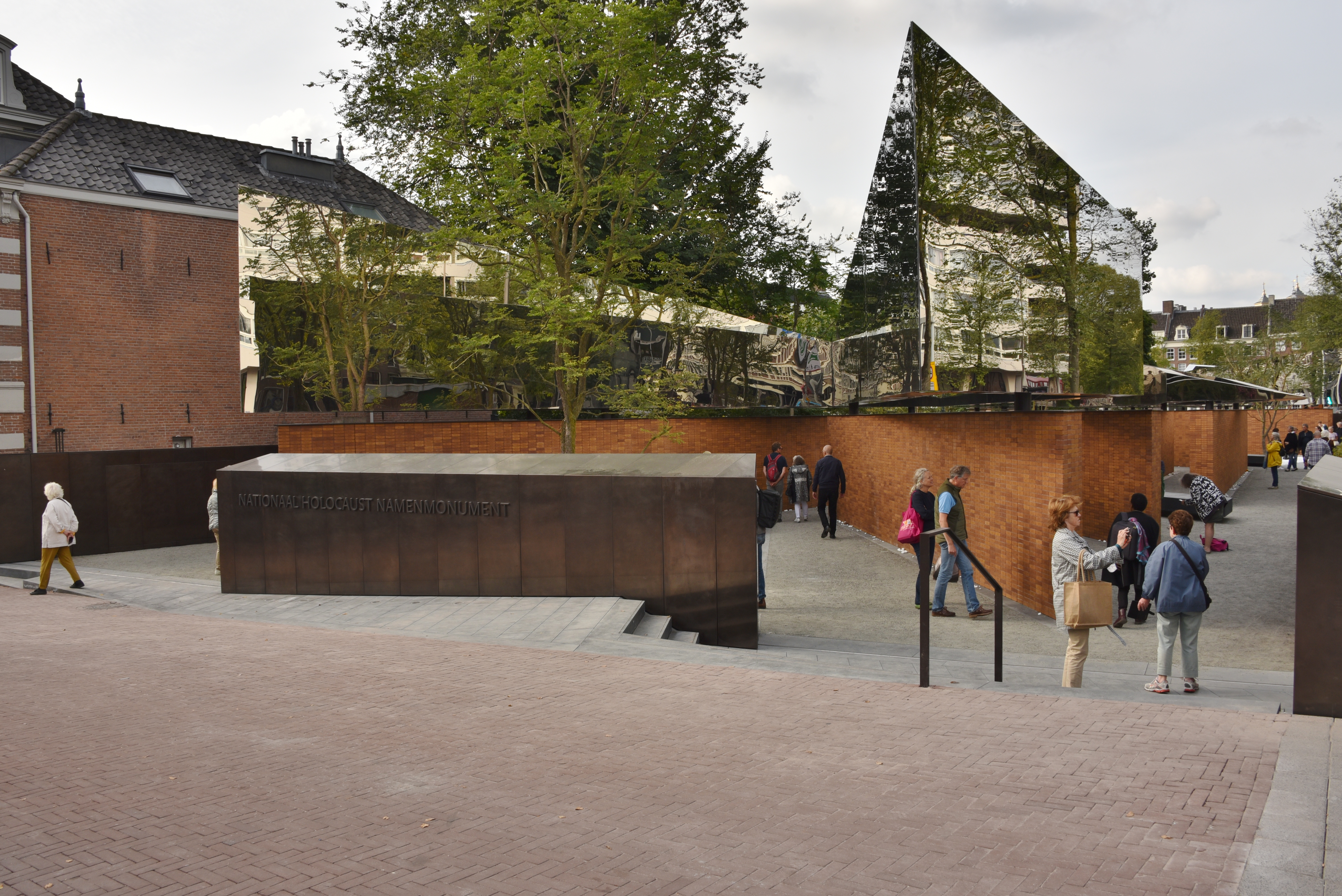
- Northern Weesperstraat entrance of the memorial with huge mirrors, 2021.
- Location: Weesperstraat, Amsterdam
- Coordinates: 52°21′56.64″N 4°54′17.61″E
- Designer: Daniel Libeskind
- Type: walls with four steel Hebrew characters on top
- Material: brick, stainless steel, mirror glass
- Length: about 80 m, area about 1,550 square meters
- Width: about 20 m
- Height: brick walls: 2.43 m, steel parts: up to 660 cm high
- Beginning date: 19 June 2020
- Dedicated date: 19 September 2021
- Dedicated to: Holocaust and Porajmos victims from the Netherlands
- Website: https://www.holocaustnamenmonument.nl/en/home/
- Oorlogsmonument ID 4417 (Dutch war monument ID)

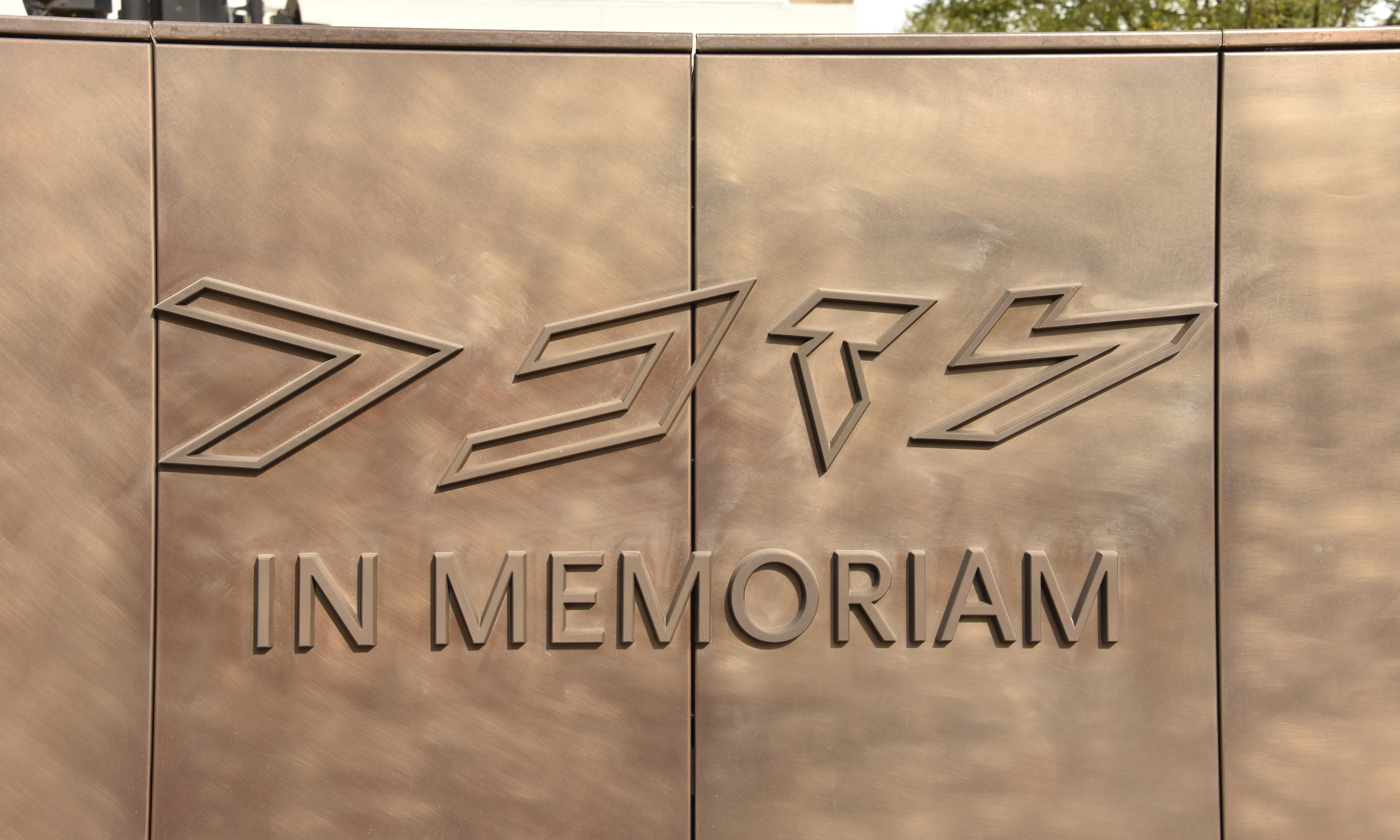
The Hebrew characters לזכר (lizkor, pronunciation "lizachàr") meaning "In Memoriam" at an entrance stair, May 2022.

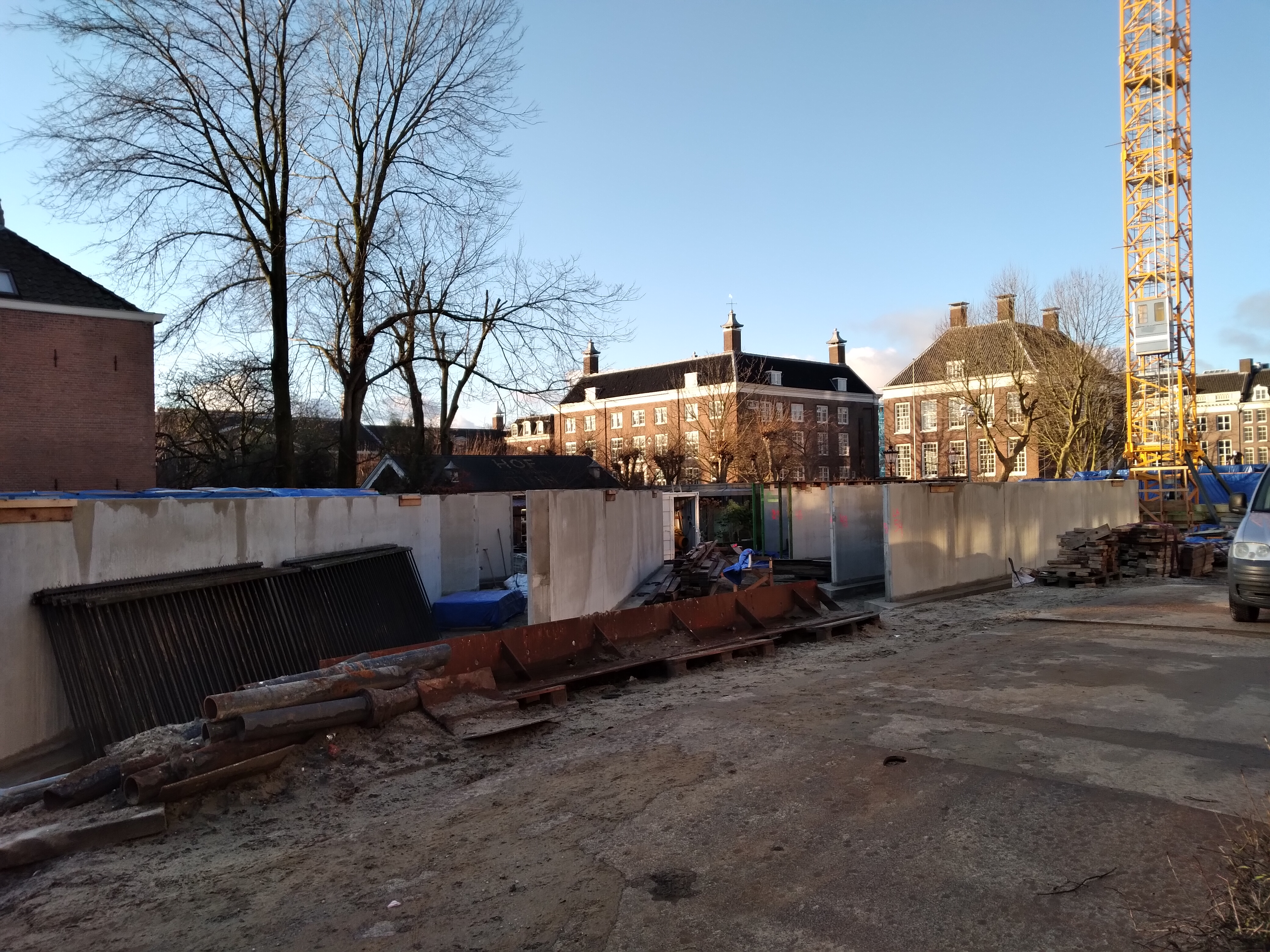
Building activities seen from the south east with the Hoftuin and Protestant Diaconia buildings in the background, January 2021.

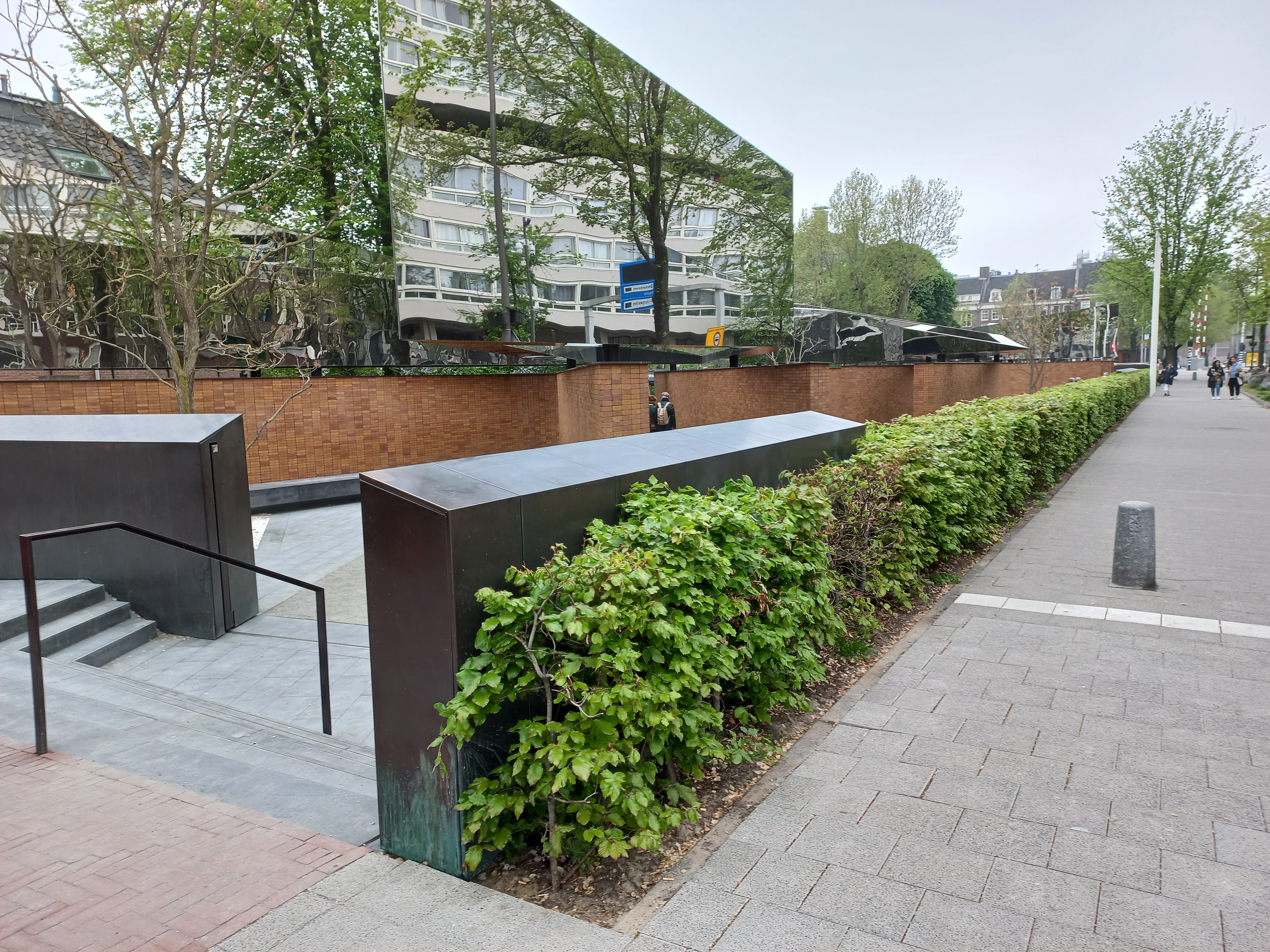
Southern entrance on the Weesperstraat, Amsterdam, 2022.

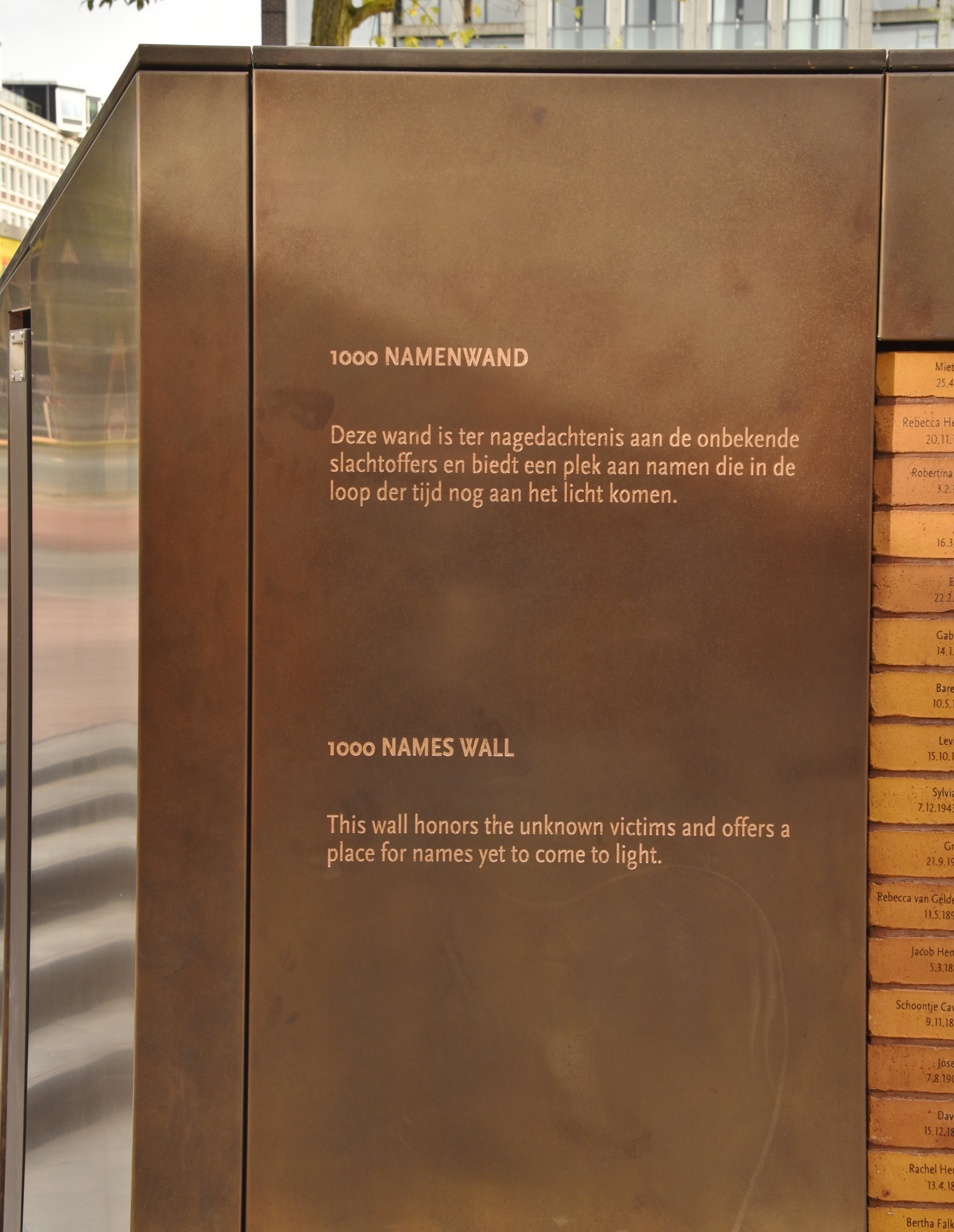
1000 Names Wall for names retrieved and added later, 2022.

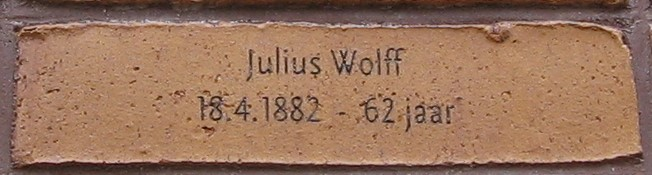
Memorial brick for mathematician Julius Wolff, Nijmegen, 18 April 1882 - Bergen-Belsen concentration camp, 8 February 8, 1945.

The National Holocaust Names Memorial (Amsterdam) (Dutch: Holocaust Namenmonument) is since 2021 the Dutch national memorial for the Holocaust and the Porajmos at Amsterdam. It commemorates the approximately 102,000 Jewish victims from the Netherlands who were arrested by the Nazi regime during the German occupation of the country (1940-1945), deported and mostly murdered in the Auschwitz and Sobibor death camps, as well as 220 Roma and Sinti victims.

The monument founded by the Nederlands Auschwitz Comité (Dutch Auschwitz Committee) is located in the former Jewish quarter (Dutch: Jodenbuurt) on a roughly north–south strip along the west side of the Weesperstraat, clockwise from the north between Nieuwe Herengracht, Weesperstraat, Nieuwe Keizersgracht, and Amstel river, east of the H'ART Museum Museum and the Hoftuin garden.

== Design ==
The memorial was designed by Studio Libeskind of the American architect Daniel Libeskind and built by Rijnboutt architects Amsterdam with bricks donated by Rodruza brick company, Rossum, Gelderland. The 1,550 square meter monument consists of four sections representing the letters in the Hebrew word לזכר (from right to left Lamedh, Zayin, Kaph and Resh, lizkor, pronunciation "lizachàr") meaning "In Memoriam".

Visitors entering the excavated area via stairs from the south or north can wander through a labyrinth of corridors between red brick walls. Inscribed on each of these 102,000 alphabetically ordered bricks is a name, date of birth and age at death of a victim. A separate wall called 1000 Names Wall of 1,000 bricks at the southern entrance was left blank to accommodate additional names of victims found later.

On top of the brick walls four huge horizontal stainless steel profiles are mounted in the shape of the four Hebrew characters. Attached elongated mirrors reflect the environment.

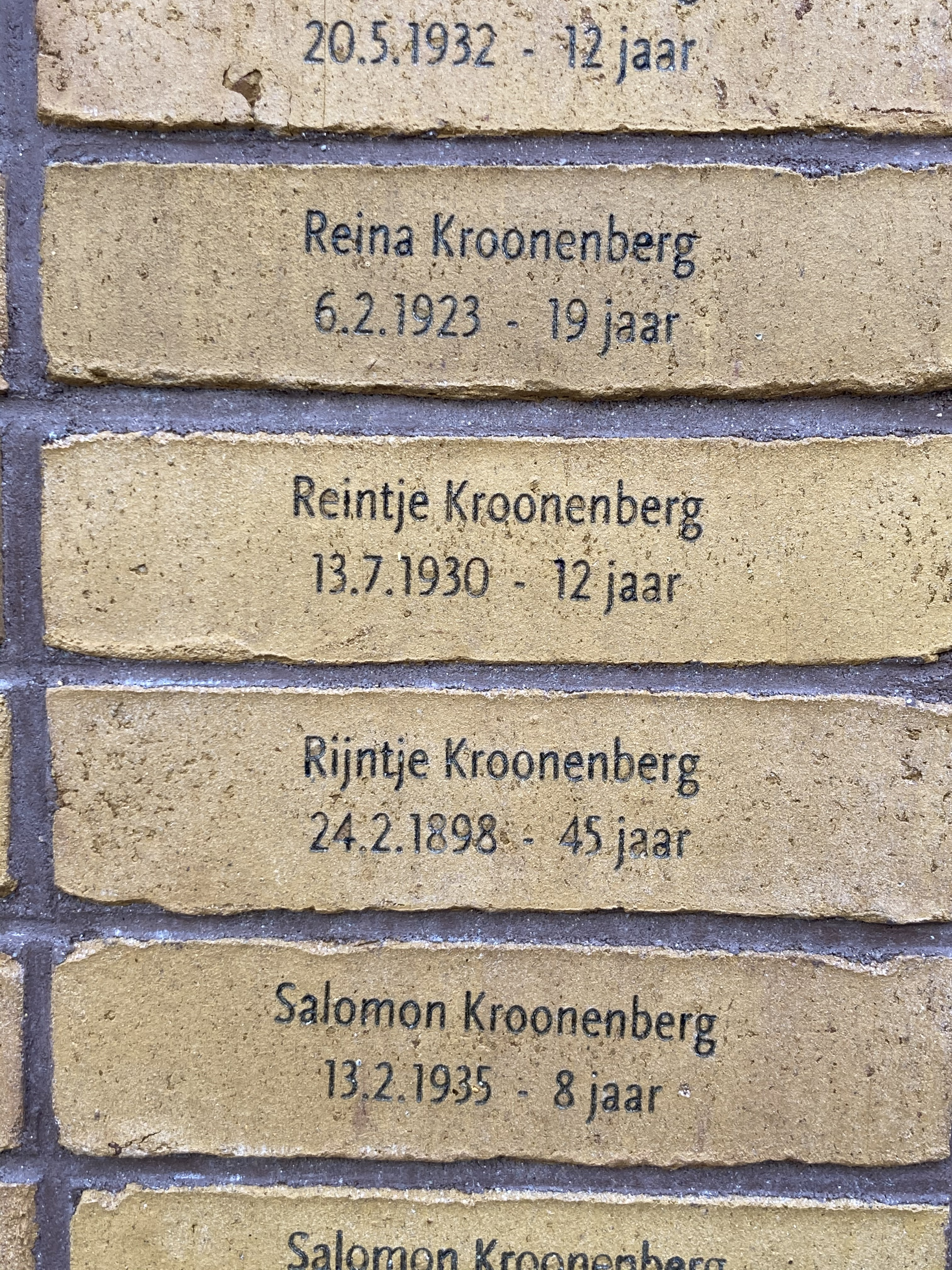
A brick column dedicated to the Kroonenberg family, 2021.

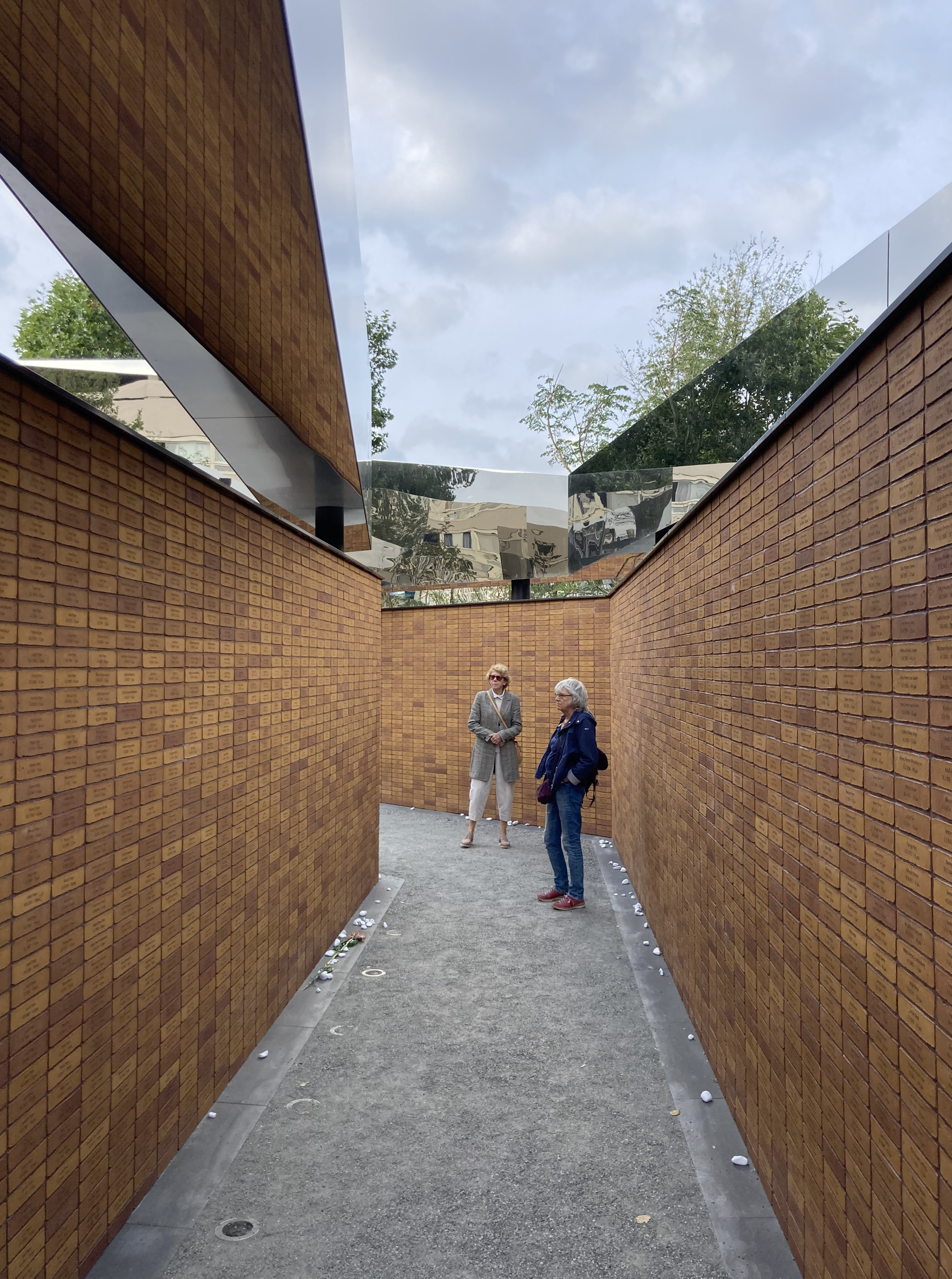
A corridor between brick walls with names, 2022.

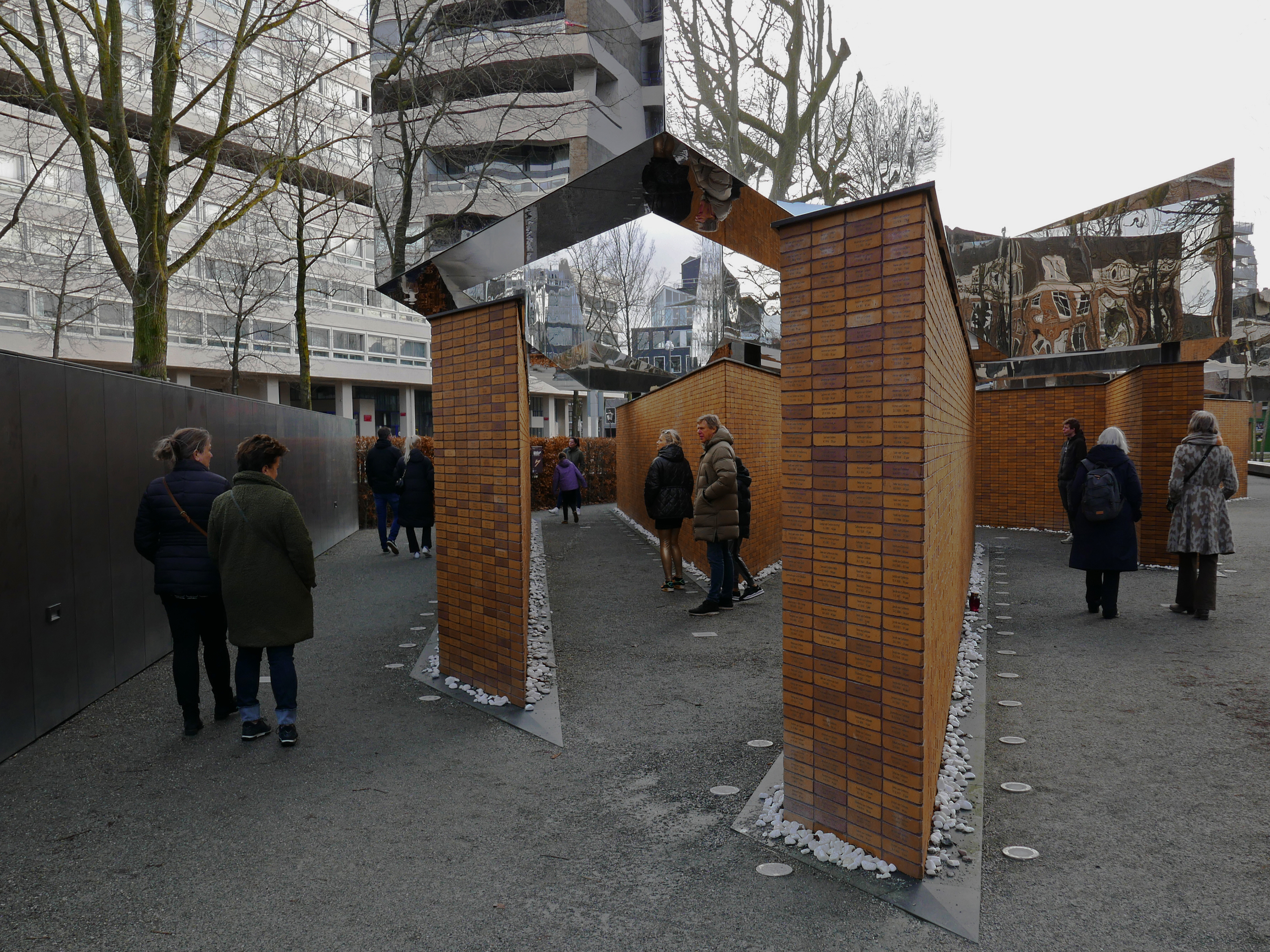
Visitors walking around the memorial viewed from the north, 2022.

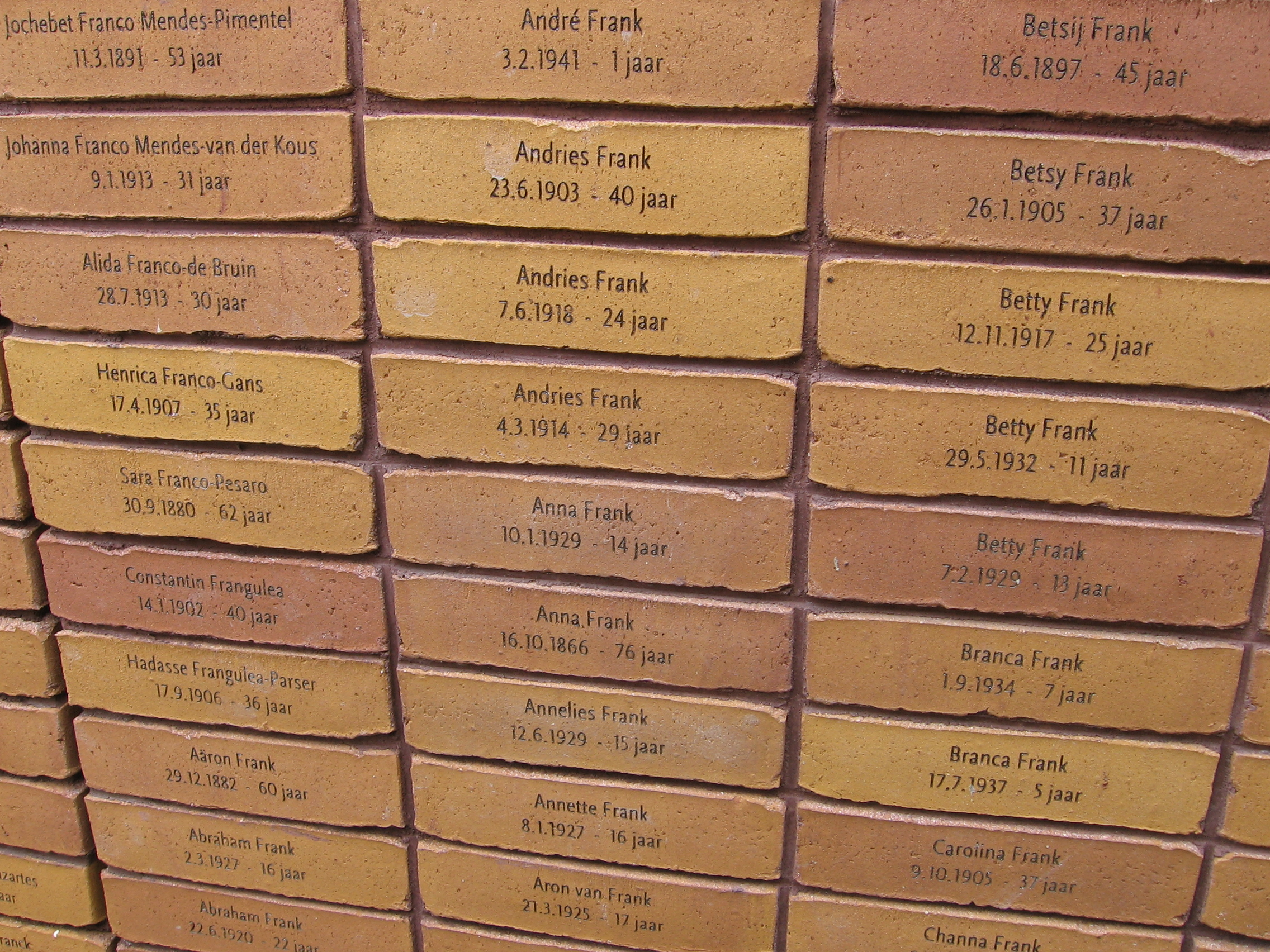
Franco Mendes Pimentel to Carolina Frank, including Anne Frank, 2023.

== Related monuments and museum ==
Further monuments and a museum commemorating the Holocaust are the nearby Auschwitz Monument by Jan Wolkers in the Wertheim Park to the east of the Holocaust Names Memorial, and the Dutch National Holocaust Museum at Plantage Middenlaan 27, Amsterdam, opened on 11 March 2024. At the former Westerbork transit camp (Dutch: Kamp Westerbork) in Hooghalen, Drenthe, there is the 102,000 Stones Monument (Dutch: De 102.000 stenen), with a stone without a name for each victim. On the internet a searchable database of all Dutch Jewish victims is available as Joods Monument (Jewish Monument).

== Book ==
- Wim de Wagt, Vijfhonderd meter namen De Holocaust en de pijn van de herinnering, Boom, Amsterdam, 2021. ISBN 9789024443383. In Dutch.

== See also ==
- Dutch National Holocaust Museum
- List of Holocaust memorials and museums in the Netherlands
