= Radio Oranje =

British-Dutch radio program

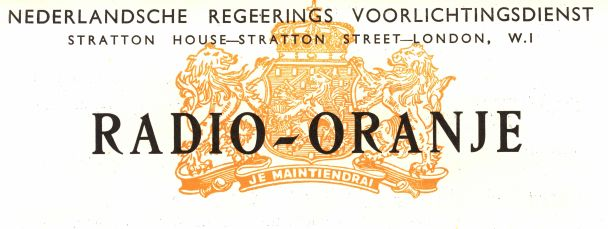
Logo

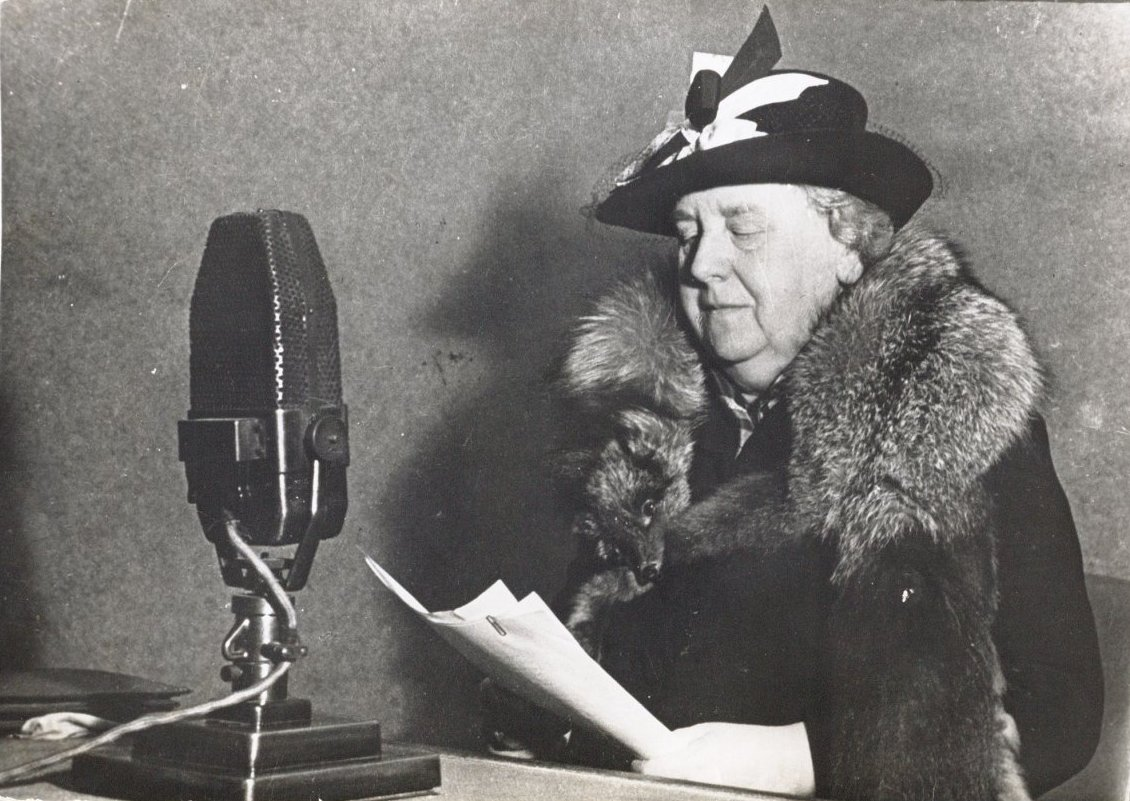
Queen Wilhelmina speaking on Radio Oranje

A Voice from Across the Water
Interview with Loe de Jong about Radio Oranje in 1981 in the programme Media Network by Jonathan Marks of Radio Netherlands Worldwide.

Radio Oranje (Dutch: [ˈraːdijoː oːˈrɑɲə]; "Radio Orange") was a Dutch radio programme on the BBC European Service broadcast to the German-occupied Netherlands during World War II. It was transmitted from London and broadcast programmes of approximately 15 minutes. It consisted of brief commentaries on current affairs and political speeches, as well as news on the Free Dutch Forces, colonies, and merchant navy. It was distinct from the BBC's own Dutch Service which only broadcast news programmes and which, unlike Radio Oranje, was not controlled by the Dutch government in exile.

Radio Oranje made its first broadcast on 28 July 1940, consisting of a rendition of the nationalist song Merck toch hoe sterck, followed by a speech by Queen Wilhelmina. In total, Wilhelmina spoke on Radio Oranje 34 times during the course of the war. The name, Radio Oranje, was a tribute to the Dutch monarchy's House of Orange-Nassau.

== Presenters ==
- Jan de Hartog
- Loe de Jong
- Herman de Man
- A. den Doolaard
- Jetty Paerl

== See also ==
- Radio Vrij Nederland - (Radio Free Netherlands) Radio Oranje's short-lived predecessor which broadcast from Paris in 1940.
- Radio Herrijzend Nederland - The service which eventually replaced Radio Oranje, operating from temporary studios in the liberated southern portion of the country in 1944/45.
- Radio Belgique - the Belgian equivalent programme
- Radio Londres - the Free French version
- BBC German Service - the German version

== Bibliography ==
- Dra. M. G. Schenk and J. B. Th. Spaan, De Koningin Sprak. Proclamaties en radio-toespraken van H.M. Koningin Wilhelmina 1940-1945, 1945 (ISBN 9061353971)
- H. J. van den Broek, Hier Radio Oranje
- O. Sinke, Verzet vanuit de Verte. De Behoedzame Koers van Radio Oranje, 2009.
