= The Kingdom of the Netherlands During World War II =

Book series by Loe de Jong

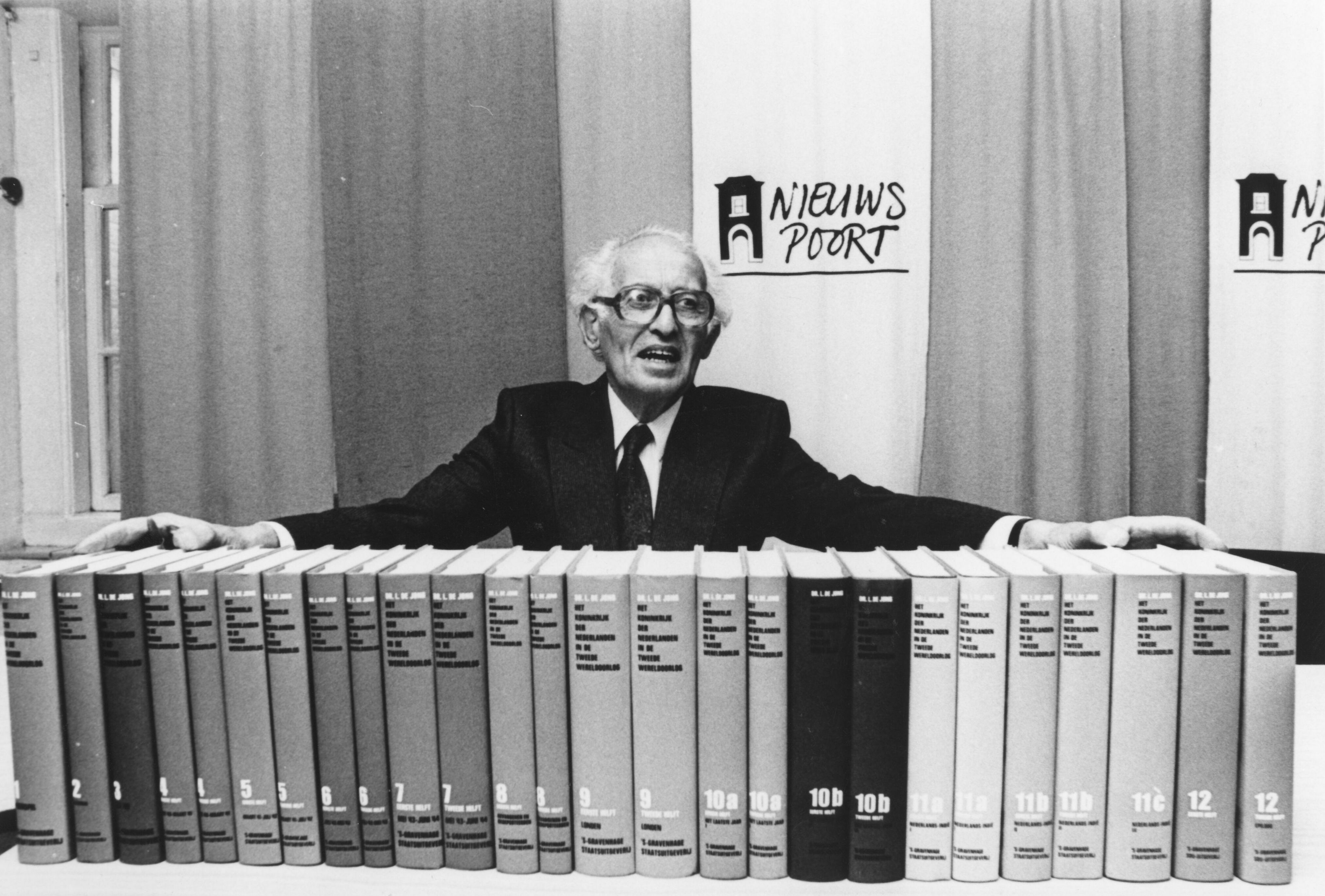
Author Loe de Jong, with all volumes of the series at the Nieuwspoort press centre

The Kingdom of the Netherlands During World War II (Dutch: Het Koninkrijk der Nederlanden in de Tweede Wereldoorlog) is the standard reference on the history of the Netherlands during World War II. The series was written by Loe de Jong (1914–2005), director of the Dutch Institute for War Documentation (Nederlands Instituut voor Oorlogsdocumentatie, or NIOD), and was published between 1969 and 1991. The series contains 14 volumes, published in 29 parts. De Jong was commissioned to write the work in 1955 by the Ministry of Education, Culture and Science. The first volume appeared in 1969, and de Jong wrote his last (volume 13) in 1988. The final volume, containing critique and responses, appeared in 1991.

== Publication history ==
Loe de Jong was commissioned to write The Kingdom of the Netherlands During World War II by the Ministry of Education and Sciences, the predecessor of the current Ministry of Education, Culture and Science. The series was to be completed in 15 years and comprise six or seven volumes, but it took de Jong until 1969 to publish the first volume. Originally the government intended for the series to be edited by four professors of the four main Dutch politico-denominational pillars, who quickly realized that they would be unable to fulfill the task in addition to their regular obligations. Instead, the assignment was given to de Jong, then a young historian who had already argued for such a reference work in 1948 and became the first director of the NIOD. De Jong himself wrote the first thirteen volumes, the last of which was published in 1988.

In 1987, the Ministry of Education, Culture, and Sciences, in response to criticism, asked the NIOD to appoint an investigative committee to evaluate de Jong's thirteen volumes and write a fourteenth, which was to include the opinions of other historians. This committee, made up of Jan Bank, Cees Fasseur, A. F. Manning, E. H. Kossmann, A. H. Paape, and Ivo Schöffer, published the fourteenth and final volume in 1991, with Jan Bank, professor of Dutch history at Leiden University, and Peter Romijn, department head at NIOD and professor of history at the University of Amsterdam, as general editors.

An electronic edition of the 18,000 pages was made available for downloading on 11 December 2011; the following Monday, 12 December, NIOD's website crashed as a result of too many downloads.

== Influence and criticism ==
De Jong's work gained much popular currency when parts of it were televised in a documentary television series from the 1960s, De Bezetting ("The Occupation"), directed by Milo Anstadt. It established de Jong as a figure of national importance and a media personality. He was later chastised for being overly concerned with his own image and reputation, a critique extended to his historical work—for instance, his cursory investigation in 1965 of the activities during World War II of Claus von Amsberg, then fiancé of crown princess Beatrix, was deemed insufficient and too positive (as opposed to his investigation in 1977 of politician Wim Aantjes, in which he too easily reached a negative conclusion, according to critics).

De Jong's work is regarded as the most important Dutch publication on World War II, and in the series he uncovered hitherto unpublicized events from the war, such as the death by firing squad of Dutch deserter Chris Meijer, executed for desertion on 12 May 1940 after a quick court-martial—he was the only Dutch soldier to be executed by the Dutch in the twentieth century.

De Jong's work supported and contributed to a vision of the Dutch during the war that has come increasingly under fire. The general idea presented in The Kingdom of the Netherlands During World War II is that the Dutch fought bravely against the German occupier, and that after they were defeated they continued to resist the occupation, with only a minority collaborating with them for instance by joining the National Socialist Movement in the Netherlands (Dutch NSB). Moreover, most Dutch people helped their Jewish fellow citizens in hiding. This myth dominated the view the Dutch had of themselves, supported in great measure by de Jong, until historians began publishing more critical studies. These pointed out that, comparatively speaking, a larger percentage of Jews was deported than in surrounding countries, that the Dutch economy at least until 1942 fared well under the German occupation, and that as late as 1944 the economy was growing due in part to Dutch companies actively trading with the Wehrmacht.

In recent years, however, his influence has waned, and his treatment of various topics has come under criticism. With each volume's publication, national discussion on the war and the way de Jong described it started anew, ever increasingly, until even members of the investigative committee publicly vented their unease with de Jong, his writing, and his media presence. In a 1981 article published in Het Parool, P.W. Klein, then a historian at Erasmus University Rotterdam, severely criticized de Jong's work:

His moralizing stance, his tone so full of pathos, the unverifiability of his statements, his chronicling approach, the lack of thematic analysis of structures and processes, his blindness toward the functioning of impersonal societal forces, his uneven treatment of the material—directed more by what happens to be known than by problem-oriented investigation—his verbosity, the lack of documentation, the ease with which he accepts sources as correct or incorrect, his limitless approvals and disapprovals, especially in regards to people: it is all fodder for historical criticism.

=== The Dutch and the Jews ===
According to I. Vuijsje, author of Tegen beter weten in. Zelfbedrog en ontkenning in de Nederlandse geschiedschrijving over de Jodenvervolging (2006), de Jong stated incorrectly that most Dutch citizens did not know the fate of deported Jews; Vuijsje argues that the majority did know. David Barnouw of NIOD responded by saying that de Jong's assessment was more nuanced than Vuijsje made it appear, and that Vuijsje argued from the benefit of hindsight.

=== De Jong's personal history ===
The investigative committee was highly critical of de Jong's insertion of his own personal history in the series. He described in volume 3 how he fled the Netherlands, in volume 7 how his family fared during the war, and reflected on his family's history in volume 12.

== See also ==
- History of the Netherlands (1939–1945)
