= Dutch National Holocaust Museum =

Holocaust museum in the Netherlands

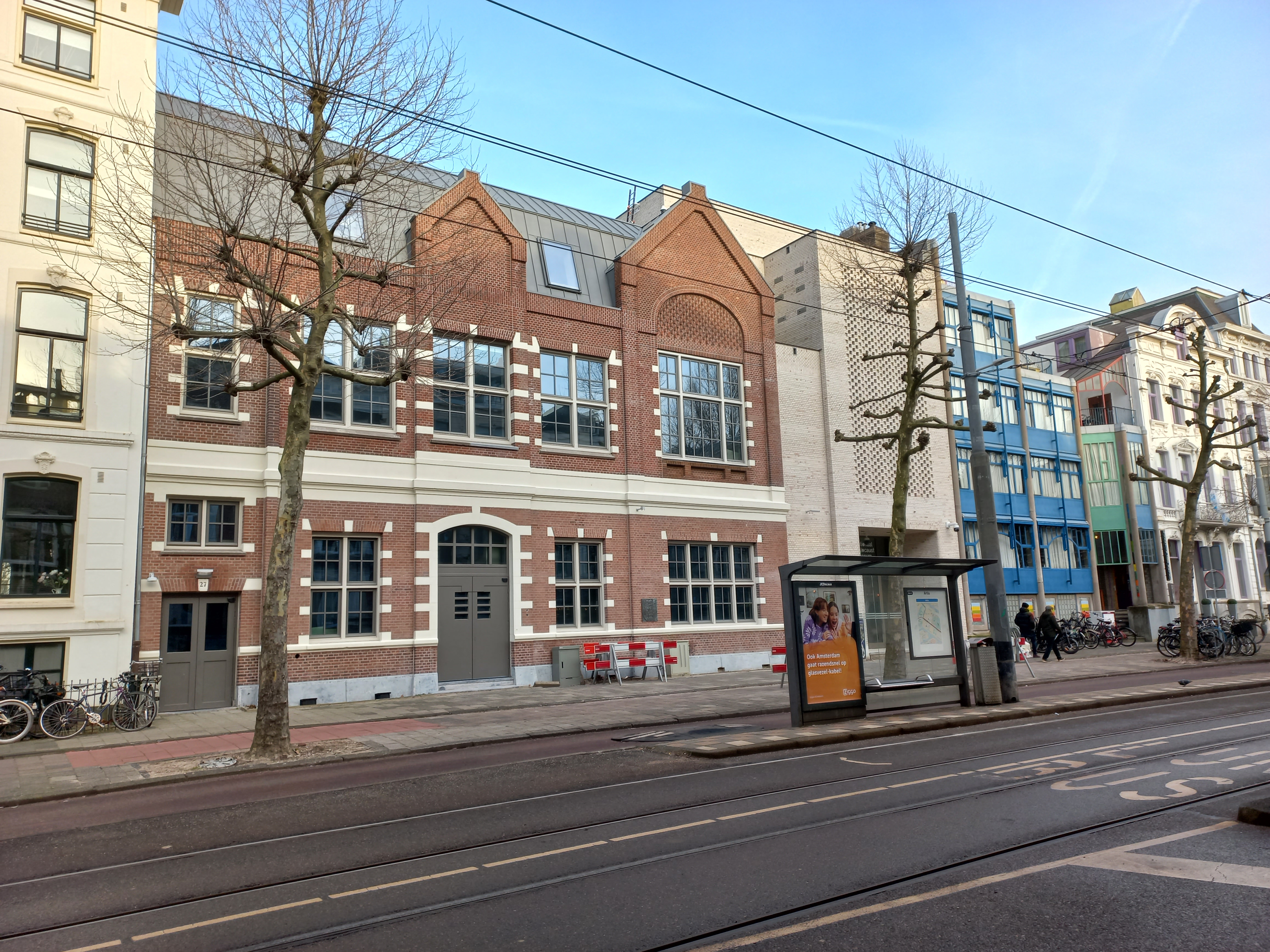
- Established: 2024
- Location: Plantage Middenlaan 27; Amsterdam, Netherlands
- Coordinates: 52°22′01″N 4°54′40″E
- Website: www.jck.nl

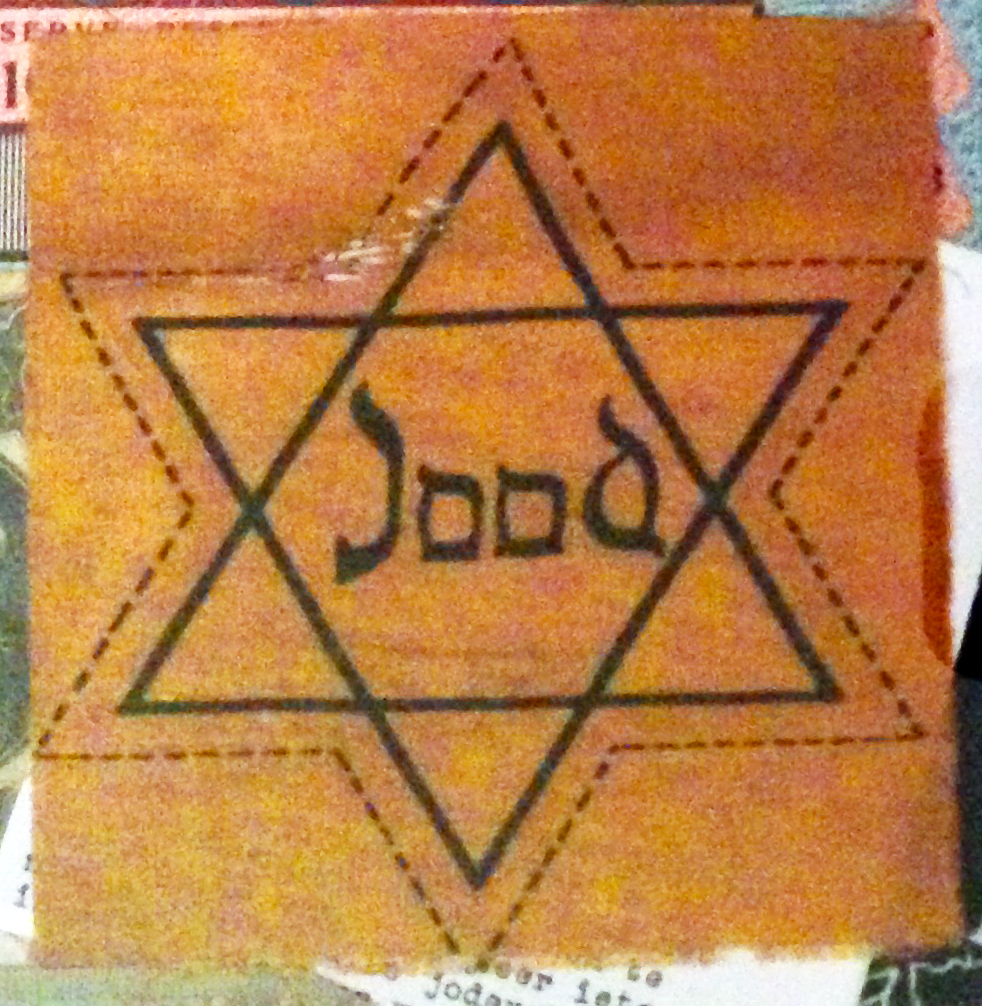
Yellow Star of David with text "Jood" (Jew) that Dutch Jews were obliged to wear during the German occupation of the Netherlands in the Second World War.

The Dutch National Holocaust Museum (Dutch: Nationaal Holocaust museum) is the first official museum on the Holocaust in the Netherlands. It is located in an historic building in the Jewish Cultural Quarter of Amsterdam, near a former child care center that played a role in rescuing Jewish children. The museum tells the story of the Holocaust through the lives of individual victimised men, women, and children. There is a floor-to-ceiling display of all the laws limiting and obliterating the rights of Jews in the Netherlands, who since the eighteenth century had been Dutch citizens with equal rights.

== Opening ceremony ==
=== Speech by Dutch king Willem-Alexander ===
The museum was inaugurated on March 10, 2024 by the Dutch monarch, Willem-Alexander. In his opening speech the king stated that the museum "brings to life the stories of people who were isolated from the rest of Dutch society, robbed of their rights, denied legal protection, rounded up, imprisoned, separated from their loved ones and murdered," identifying the root cause as antisemitism. "It is up to us all to stop antisemitism before it causes a hurricane that blows away everything that we hold dear. Let us never forget that Sobibor began in the Vondelpark with a sign that read 'Forbidden for Jews'. There is no excuse for ignorance – no place for relativism, no room for 'ifs and buts'. Knowledge of the Holocaust is not optional." As the monarch put it in his speech, "The walls of the museum are covered – wall after wall after wall – with the many hundreds of ordinances, rules, instructions and bans: the small steps by which the Jewish population was set apart. Mandatory termination of employment. Forced registration. Banishment from public life. No bicycle. No telephone. No savings. No home. No freedom of movement. No life."

=== Public reaction ===
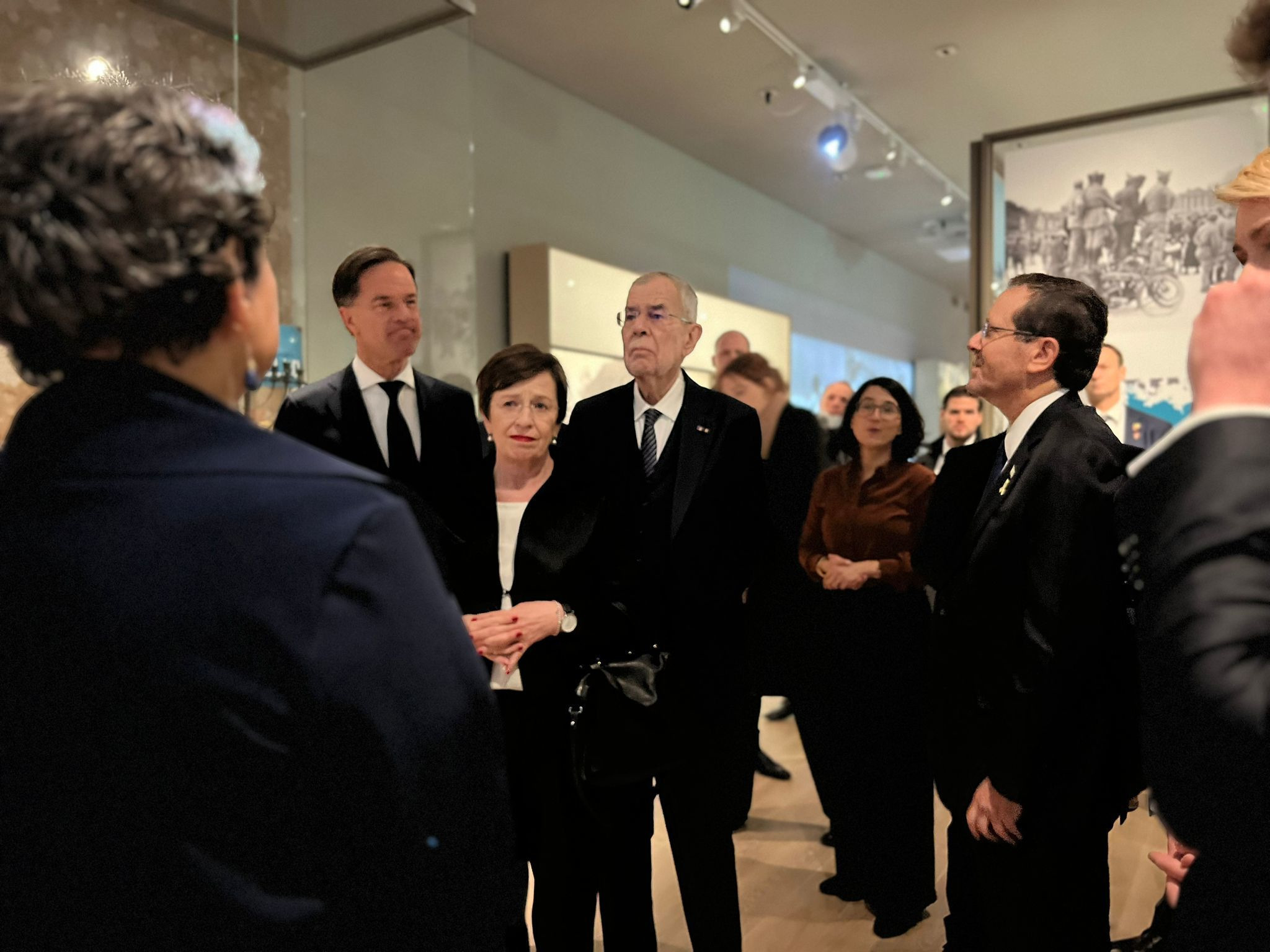
President of Israel Isaac Herzog attending opening of Holocaust Museum in Amsterdam

The opening was broadcast live on Dutch national television and covered by the international press. A ceremony was held at the Portuguese Synagogue in the presence of foreign dignitaries. The opening attracted protestors who objected to the attendance of the President of Israel Isaac Herzog, which was described as controversial due to the ongoing war in Gaza. About a thousand demonstrators gathered near the site, kept at a distance by police.

== History of the Jews in Amsterdam ==
The city of Amsterdam played a major role in the history of the Jews in the Netherlands. Three-quarters of the country's Jews, the highest percentage in Western Europe, in total 102,000 people, were killed during the Nazi occupation of the Netherlands during 1940–1945. Scholars see the concentration of the Jewish population in one place, the single-mindedness of Nazi policies to separate Jews from the general Dutch population and then to eliminate them, the cooperation of Dutch authorities, as well as the Jewish Council in Amsterdam as factors resulting in the high percentage of Jewish deaths. The postwar Dutch population was seemingly not interested in the suffering of its Jewish population under the Nazis, but the museum now invites visitors to "Immerse yourself in the history of the persecution of the Jews."

== See also ==
- Dutch Jews
- Dutch Resistance Museum
- National Holocaust Names Memorial
- NIOD Institute for War, Holocaust and Genocide Studies
- The Holocaust in the Netherlands
