= Loe de Jong =

Dutch historian (1914–2005)

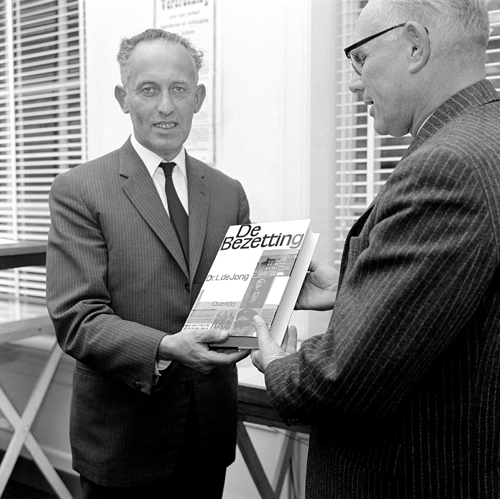
Loe de Jong (1966)

Louis "Loe" de Jong (24 April 1914 in Amsterdam – 15 March 2005 in Amsterdam) was a Dutch historian who specialised in the Netherlands in World War II and the Dutch resistance.

De Jong studied history and social geography at the University of Amsterdam. He worked as a foreign newspaper correspondent from 1938 until 1940. He wrote on 31 August 1939 that an invasion of Poland would not escalate into war: "The Second World War has been averted for a long time [for the immediate future], probably for years", was printed on 2 September. He wrote on 6 April 1940 that there was no indication whatsoever that "Berlin thought of expanding the war [into other countries]". After the German invasion of the Netherlands, De Jong managed to escape to London with his wife Liesbeth Cost Budde on 15 May 1940 from the port of IJmuiden on board of the coaster Friso. During the war years he worked for Radio Oranje, broadcasting to the Nazi-occupied Netherlands..

Interview with Loe de Jong for Dutch Radio Oranje

The magnum opus of Loe de Jong, The Kingdom of the Netherlands During World War II (Dutch: Het Koninkrijk der Nederlanden in de Tweede Wereldoorlog), in fourteen volumes and 18,000 pages, is the standard reference on the history of the Netherlands during World War II. The Dutch Institute for War Documentation (NIOD) made an electronic and searchable edition of the entire work available online in December 2011, licensed under creative commons CC BY 3.0.

De Jong contributed to many other historical works on the Netherlands and lectured at symposia on the European resistance. In 1988, he was awarded the Gouden Ganzenveer for his contributions to Dutch written and printed culture. In 1963 he became a member of the Royal Netherlands Academy of Arts and Sciences.

Loe de Jong was Jewish by birth. He lost the greater part of his family including his parents and his twin brother during the Second World War.

== See also ==
- The Silent Historian - a film about Loe de Jong
- Jean-Louis Crémieux-Brilhac (1917–2015), a French historian with a similar profile
