= Curt =

Curt is a masculine given name. Notable people with the name include:

- Curt Ackermann (1905–1988), German actor and voice actor
- Curt Alexander (1900–1945), German writer
- Curt Anderson, American politician, lawyer and former broadcast journalist
- Curt Anderson (musician) (born 1984), musical artist
- Curt Andersson (1937–2018), Swedish sports shooter
- Curt Andstén (1881–1926), Finnish sailor
- Curt Apduhan, American cinematographer
- Curt Apsey (born 1962), American sports administrator
- Curt Backeberg (1894–1966), German horticulturist
- Curt Bader (born 1961), American canoeist
- Curt Badinski (1890–1966), German general
- Curt Baham (born 1963), American football player
- Curt Barclay (1931-1985), American baseball player
- Curt Becker (1905–1987), German politician
- Curt Beech, American art director and production designer
- Curt Beilschmidt (1886−1962), German composer
- Curt Benckert (1887–1950), Swedish tennis player
- Curt Bennett (born 1948), Canadian-born American ice hockey player
- Curt Bennett (American football) (1935–2011), American football player and coach
- Curt Berglund (1923–2003), Swedish former International Ice Hockey Federation executive
- Curt Bergsten (1912–1987), Swedish footballer
- Curt Berklund (1929–2013), American administrator
- Curt Bernard (1878–1955), American baseball player
- Curt Bisquera (born 1964), American studio drummer
- Curt Blefary (1943–2001), American baseball player
- Curt Bloch (1908–1975), German Jewish writer
- Curt Boettcher (1944–1987), American singer-songwriter
- Curt Bois (1901–1991), German actor
- Curt W. Bondy (1894–1972), German psychologist and social educator
- Curt Boström (1926–2014), Swedish social democrat politician
- Curt Bourque (born 1967), American jockey
- Curt Bowley (born 1954), American politician
- Curt Brackenbury (born 1952), Canadian ice hockey player
- Curt Bramble, American politician
- Curt Brasket (1932–2014), American chess player
- Curt Bräuer (1889–1969), German career diplomat
- Curt Johannes Braun (1903–1961), German screenwriter
- Curt Brinkman (1953–2010), American runner
- Curt Bromm, American lawyer and politician
- Curt Brown (born 1956), American astronaut
- Curt Brown (baseball) (born 1960), American baseball player
- Curt Brunnée (1928–2023), German physicist
- Curt Brunnqvist (1924–2016), Swedish rower
- Curt Bruns (1915–1945), German war criminal
- Curt Byrum (born 1958), American professional golfer
- Curt Cacioppo (born 1951), American composer
- Curt Carlson (1914–1999), American businessman
- Curt Casali (born 1988), American baseball catcher for the San Francisco Giants
- Curt Chambers, American singer-songwriter
- Curt Dougherty (born 1956), American politician
- Curt Gowdy (1919–2006), American sportscaster
- Curt Hasler (born 1964), American baseball coach
- Curt Hennig (1958–2003), American professional wrestler
- Curt Jensen (born 1990), American shot put thrower
- Curd Jürgens (1915–1982), German-Austrian actor
- Curt Kirkwood (1959), American musician Guitarist, vocals and Song Writer for Meat Puppets
- Curt Prickler (1885–1952), German film producer
- Wolf Curt von Schierbrand (1807–1888), German zoologist
- Curt Schilling (born 1966), American baseball player
- Curt Sjöö (born 1937), Swedish Army lieutenant general
- Curt Smith (born 1961), British musician, member of Tears for Fears
- Curt Stone (1922–2021), American long-distance runner
- Curtis Stone (born 1975), Australian chef and TV personality
- Curt Voight, American politician
- Curt Westberg (born 1943), Swedish Air Force major general
- Curt Wittenberg, American biologist

== See also ==
- Kurt
