= The Holocaust in the Netherlands =

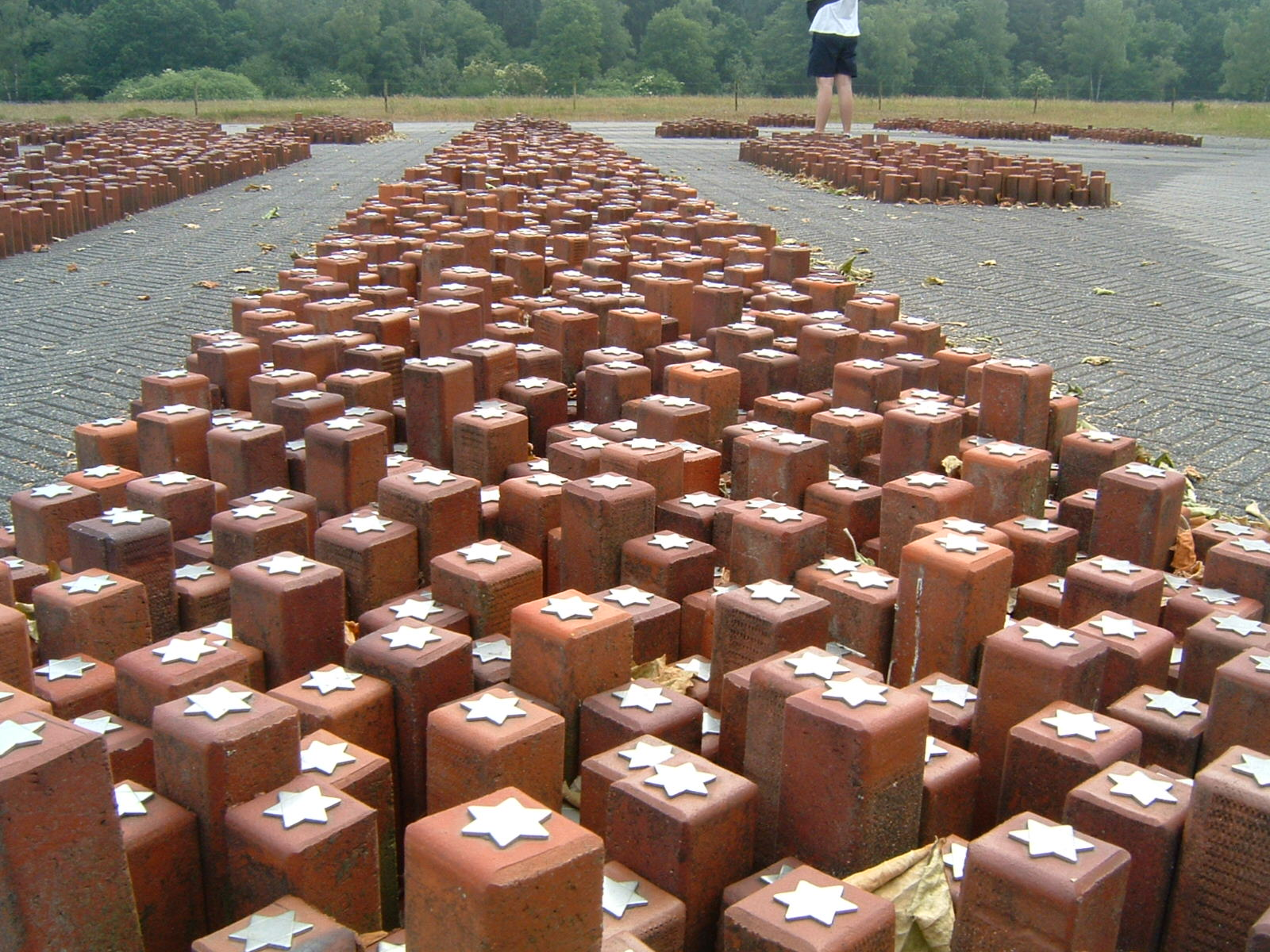
Monument at Westerbork: Each stone represents one person who was detained at Westerbork prior to being murdered in a Nazi camp, A Star of David for the Jewish victims, 245 stones have a flame, representing the Romani victims. A couple of stones have no symbol, marking a Resistance victim. All 10200 stones together form the shape of the Netherlands.

The Holocaust saw the mass murder of Dutch Jews by Nazi Germany in occupied Netherlands during the Second World War. The Nazi occupation in 1940 immediately began disrupting the norms of Dutch society, separating Dutch Jews in multiple ways from the general Dutch population. The Nazis used existing Dutch civil administration as well as the Dutch Jewish Council "as an invaluable means to their end".

Some 75% of the Dutch-Jewish population was killed in the Holocaust, an unusually high percentage compared to other occupied countries in western Europe. There is debate among scholars about the extent to which the Dutch public was aware of the Holocaust. Postwar Netherlands has grappled with constructing the historical memory of the Holocaust and created monuments memorialising this chapter of Dutch history. The Dutch National Holocaust Museum opened in March 2024.

== Background ==
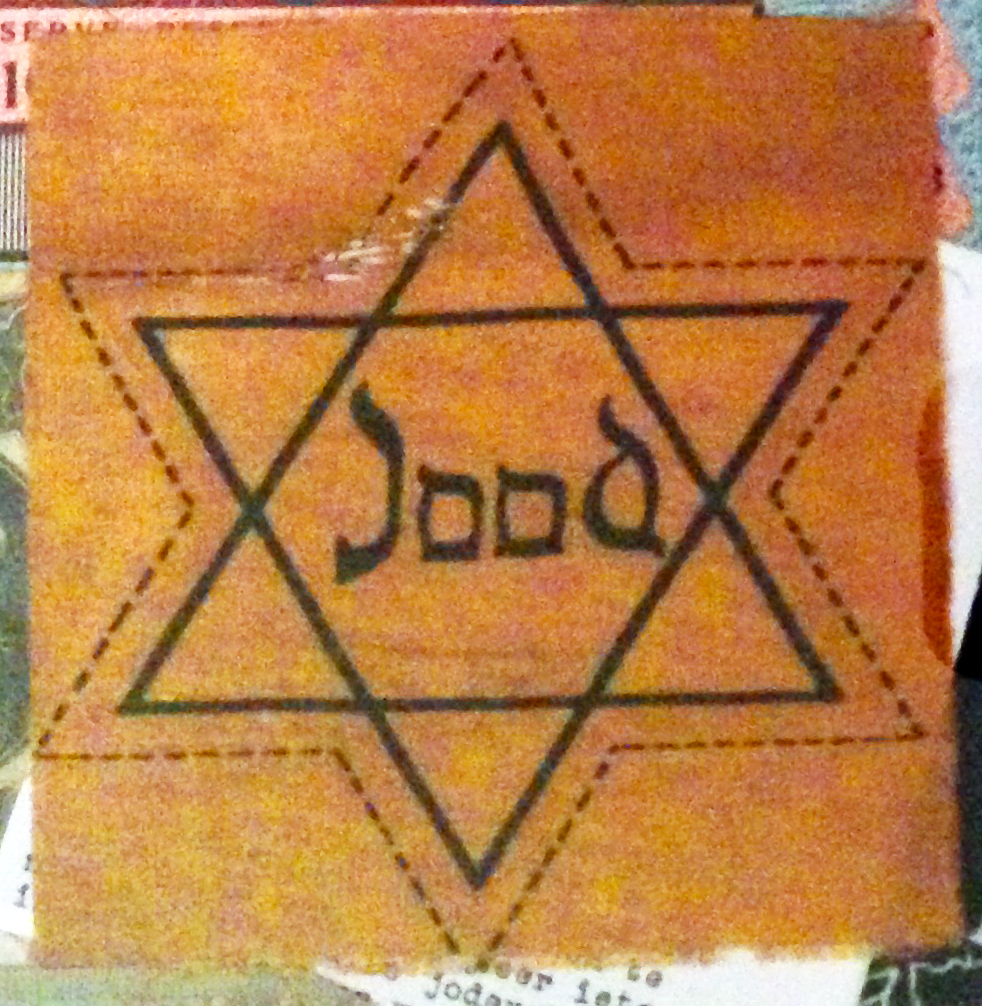
Yellow Star of David that Dutch Jews were forced to wear

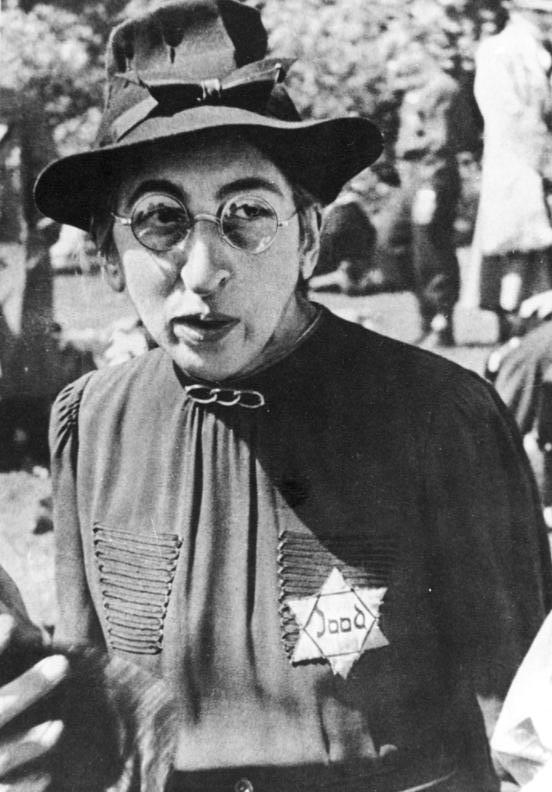
Jewish woman wearing a yellow Star of David during the razzia of 20 June 1943

Jews began settling in the Netherlands from the 17th century, where they benefited from the Dutch tradition of religious tolerance, especially in Amsterdam. In 1796 and 1834, Jewish emancipation laws granted full citizenship to Dutch Jews. From the late nineteenth century until the 1930s, Dutch Jews became increasingly secularised and integrated into Dutch society. Many no longer observed Jewish religious or cultural practices or lived in Jewish communities. While Dutch society formed segments or "pillars" in the nineteenth and twentieth centuries, the Jews were not a separate pillar, but rather tended to be affiliated with existing pillars.

In 1939 the Jewish population of the Netherlands was between 140,000 and 150,000, 24,000–34,000 of whom were refugees from Germany and German-controlled areas. That year, the Committee for Jewish Refugees established the Westerbork transit camp to process incoming refugees—the German occupiers would later repurpose it to process outgoing Jews to labour and concentration camps. About half of the total Jewish population—about 79,000—lived in Amsterdam.

== Occupation ==
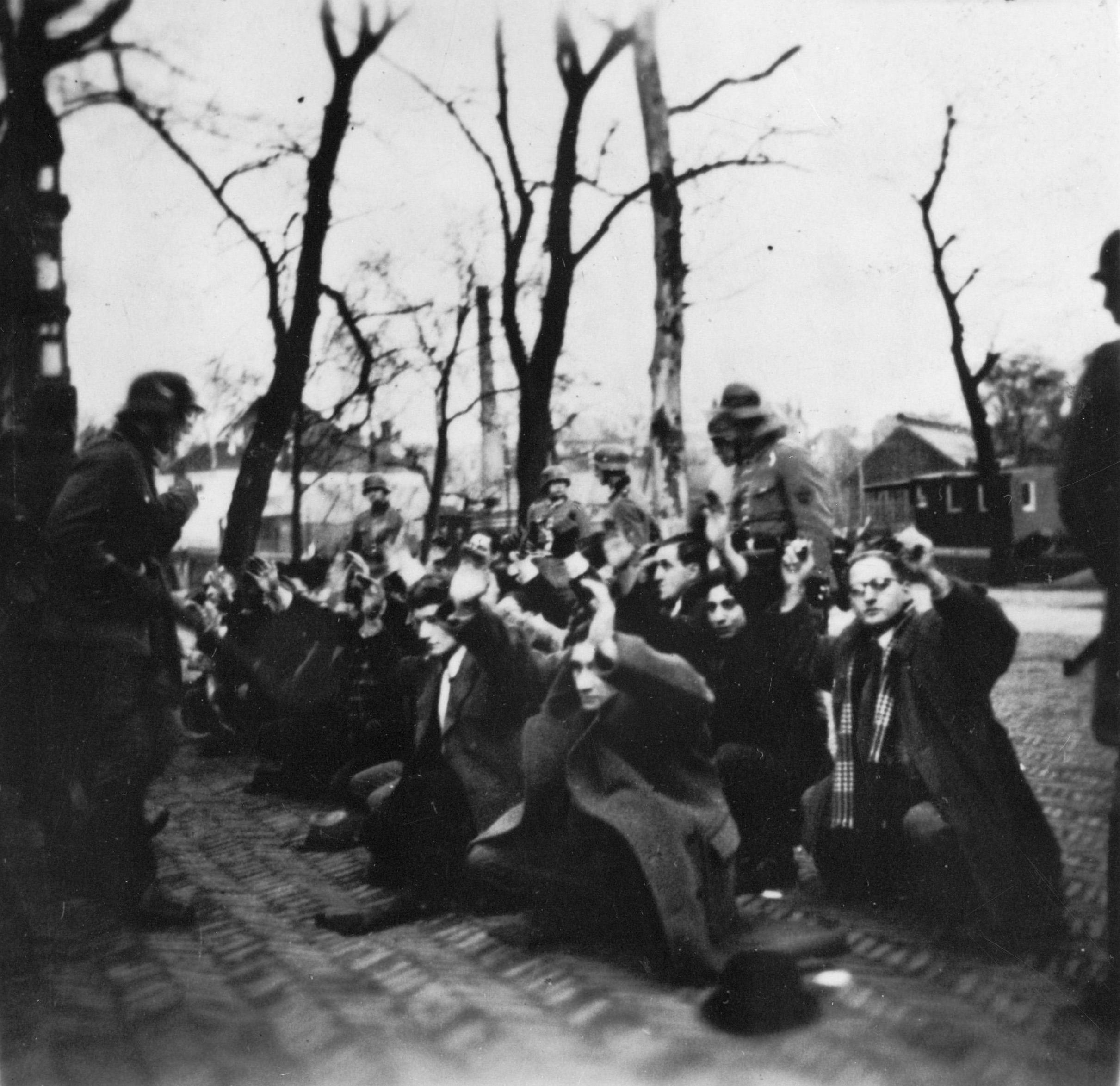
Germans arrest Jews in the Jonas Daniel Meijerplein in Amsterdam, February 1941

The neutrality of the Netherlands did not protect it from the Nazi invasion of May 1940. Over the next two years, the German occupiers worked with the existing Dutch bureaucracy to gain control of the administrative system to implement its own policy aims. Rather than leaving the Dutch government independent or setting up a military occupation, the Nazis' plan for the Netherlands involved implementing a civil occupation. Leaders appointed by the Germans to head the civil administration of the Netherlands were all Nazis with a strong ideological history. Hitler's representative, the Austrian Nazi Arthur Seyss-Inquart, quickly took command of the Dutch administrative system as the Reichskommissar for the occupied Dutch territories. Hanns Albin Rauter was appointed the Higher SS and Police Chief (HSSPF). Rauter reported directly to Heinrich Himmler.

A key aim was to separate Dutch Jews from their legal protections and Dutch cultural milieu, extinguishing first their rights and then their lives. One of Rauter's first initiatives involved consolidating the Dutch police under the Nazi-controlled Ministry of Justice. Rauter positioned the SS and the police to have full authority over the entire Jewish population of the occupied Netherlands. This gave the SS and the police the ability to persecute Jews in the Netherlands, and eventually implement the Final Solution. Rauter had not only the Dutch police, but 4,700 German police personnel at his disposal.

== Registration ==
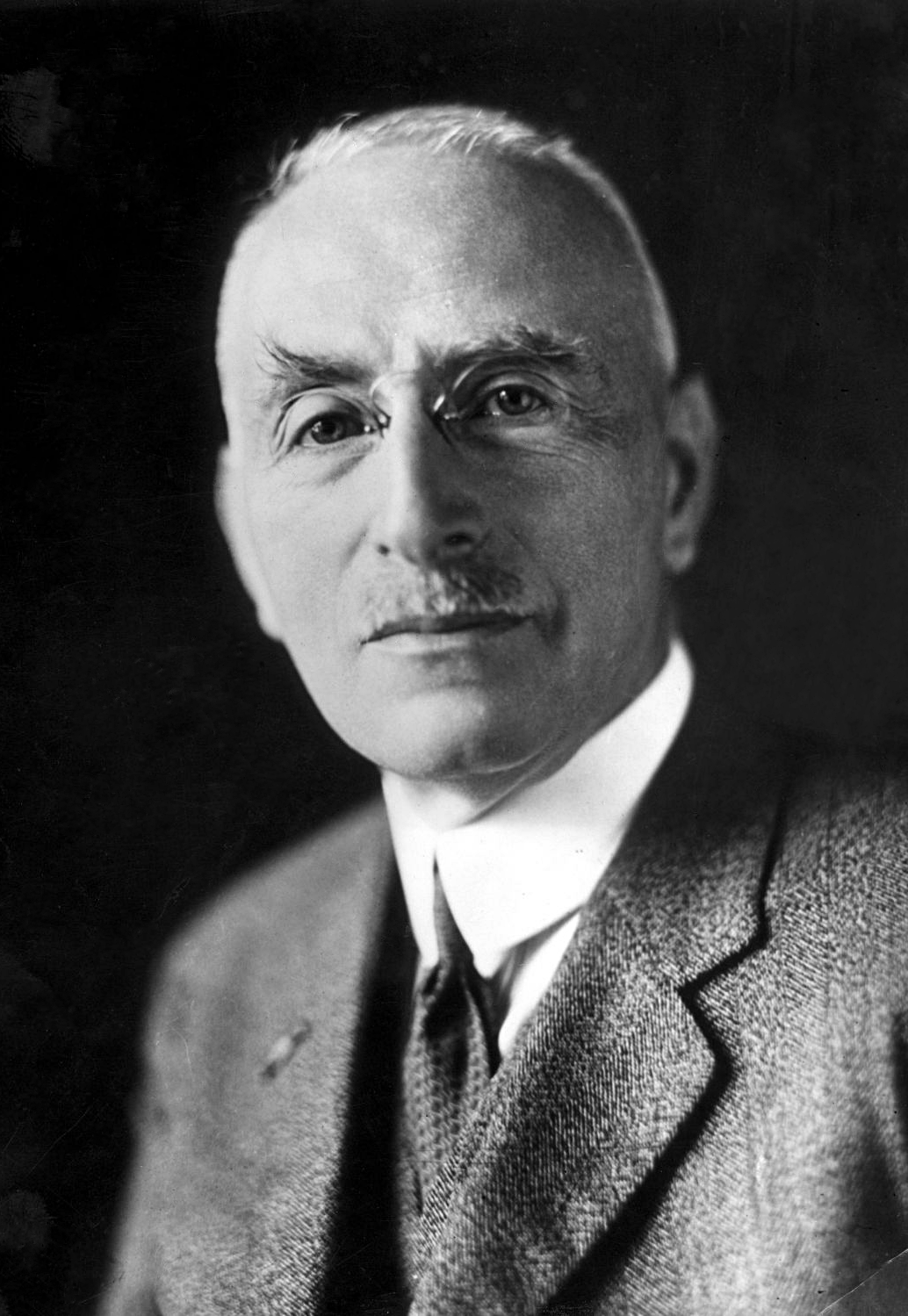
Lodewijk Ernst Visser, President of the Dutch Supreme Court from 1939 to 1941, was forced to resign by the Nazi occupying forces because he was a Jew.

German authorities issued a series of increasingly strict regulations to isolate and exclude Jews from the general Dutch population, a key factor in the policies leading to the genocide. Dutch Jews overwhelmingly complied with registration.

Immediately after occupation in May 1940, all businesses directed by a Jew or owned in whole or part by Jews (including Jewish shareholders) were required to register with the government. The relevant law defined a Jew as any person who had three or more Jewish grandparents; who had two Jewish grandparents and belonged to a Jewish congregation; or who was married to a Jew. As Jacob Presser commented, "registration had come to mean compulsory submission of a complete personal history."

In October 1940, Dutch authorities required all civil servants to sign a “Declaration of Aryan Descent” that neither they, their spouse, nor their parents or grandparents were “part of the Jewish faith.” The following month, summary dismissals of Jewish public servants began, including Lodewijk Visser, president of the Dutch Supreme Court. Over 2,500 Jews lost their public positions. Only the forced removal of Dutch Jews from secondary and higher education incited a response from the public.

On 10 January 1941, Seyss-Inquart mandated the registration of all Jewish citizens and expanded the definition of a Jew, with one Jewish grandparent sufficing. Despite sporadic refusals, about 160,000 registered, receiving a black “J” stamp in their identity cards. These cards—required to be carried at all times—were nearly impossible to forge, and a useful tool for the perpetrator to distinguish who was Jewish. Similarly, the birth, death, and marriage records of Jews in the Netherlands were marked to distinguish them from the non-Jewish citizenry. From 5 May 1942, Jews were forced to wear a yellow star on their clothing.

== Onderduikers ==
Like in other occupied countries, attempts were made to hide Jews and other wanted people from German authorities. The geography of the Netherlands made this difficult, since the country is less than 20,000 square miles of flatlands. About 25–30,000 Jews went into hiding as onderduikers (literally “under-divers”)—most famously Anne Frank, who hid with her family in an Amsterdam house from July 1942 for over two years. At a vacation home called “The High Nest” near Naarden, a succession of Jews and other fugitives lived in secrecy from January 1943. Coincidentally, both hiding places were discovered in August 1944, and members of each household met as they were deported to Westerbork and then Auschwitz.

Many non-Jewish Netherlanders helped to hide Jews, often individually in exchange for payment. Two of the most active helpers were Corrie Ten Boom and Henriëtte Pimentel, both of whom were eventually arrested and deported themselves. Another notable person was Leendert Overduin, a Dutch Reformed Church pastor who ran Group Overduin that helped about 1,000 Jews to find hiding places. 21 Dutch people have been awarded the Jewish Rescuers Citation by B’nai B’rith for helping to save Jews from deportation.

The onderduikers in turn drove a reward system for “Jew-hunters”—notably the Henneicke Column, originally a group tasked with inventorying abandoned Jewish properties, which became a bounty-hunting operation. The Henneicke Column delivered 8,000-9,000 Jews to Nazi authorities between March and October 1943 alone, earning up to 15 guilders per head.

Of the onderduikers, about a third were caught and deported. Some were betrayed by friends, or strangers who agreed to hide them under false pretenses. Others were caught by the police. Of the 15–20,000 who survived, 4,000 were young children.

== Expropriation and theft ==
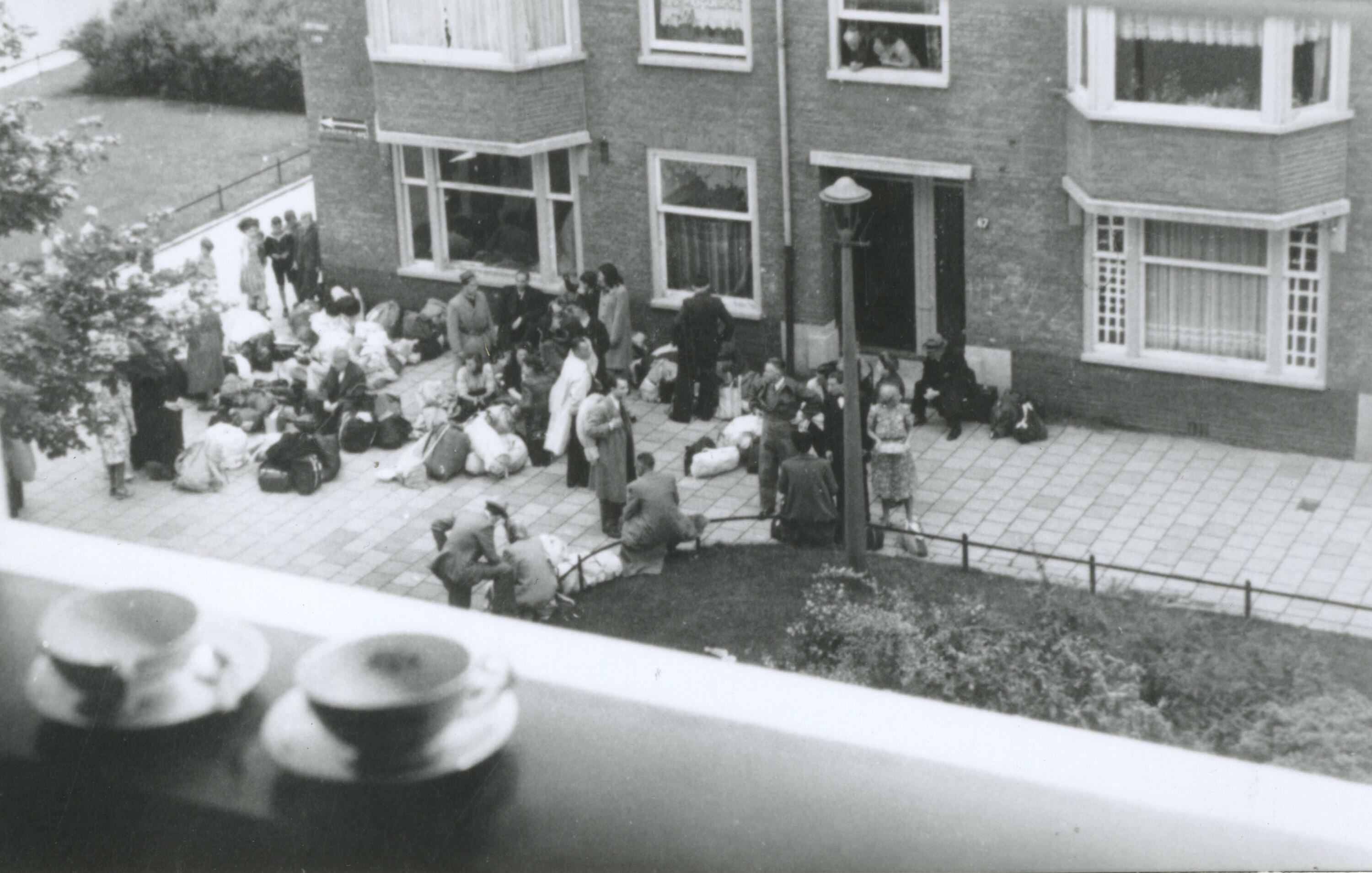
Jews packed up for deportation solely with the possessions they could carry

Before being deported and murdered, Dutch Jews were systematically stripped of all of their properties and possessions, including businesses, real estate, financial assets, artworks and household possessions. Gerard Aalders, a Dutch researcher at the Netherlands State Institute for War Documentation, estimated that the Dutch Jewish community was "the most affected by German rapacity".

Looting organisations included the Dienststelle Mühlmann, headed by Kajetan Mühlmann under Seyss-Inquart, and Lippmann & Rosenthal & Co. (or "LiRo"), a Jewish bank that the Nazis took over to disguise theft as legal transactions. The occupiers documented confiscation and re-sale in a set of Verkaufsbücher ("sales books") which are today owned by the Dutch National Archive.

== Deportations ==
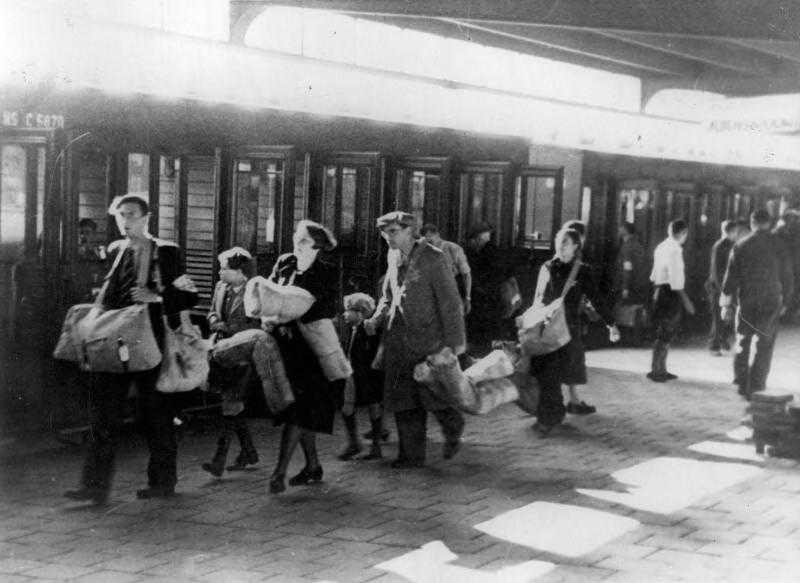
Deportations

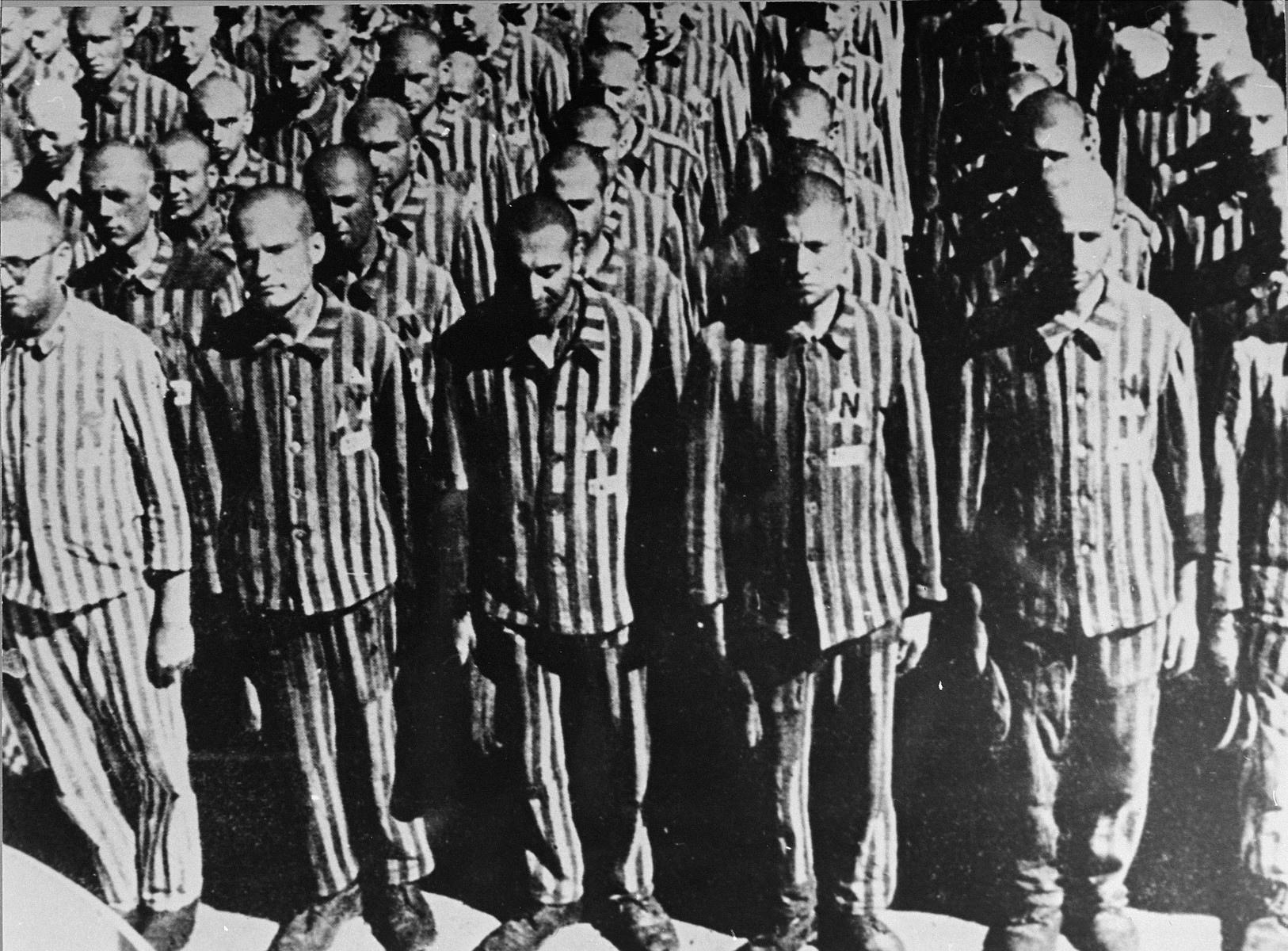
Dutch Jews at Mauthausen, 26 June 1941

Two Dutch Jews who committed suicide by touching the electric fence in Mauthausen, 1942

Like other occupied countries, The Netherlands was required to deport a quota of Jews to Germany for war labor. The residency status of Jews in the Netherlands was irrelevant to German authorities; Seyss-Inquart stated "The Jews, for us, are not Dutchmen. They are those enemies with whom we can come neither to an armistice nor to a peace."

In January 1942—the same month as the Wannsee Conference, where the Holocaust was largely strategized—all Jews in The Netherlands were “evacuated” to the three Jewish districts of Amsterdam. On 25 March, “mixed marriages” were disallowed to close a loophole that exempted Jews from deportation. From 5 May, Jews were required to wear the yellow badge for identification.

Deportations officially began on 15 July 1942, when the first two trains departed Amsterdam Centraal station for Westerbork transit camp, the first of about 140 “Jew trains” operated by Dutch railways. From then until September 1944, the camp would deport approximately 100,000 Jews to concentration camps, almost all of whom were eventually killed.

The initial demand for 15,000 deportees per year could be met with foreign-born Jews, but when Germany increased the quota to 40,000, it became necessary to deport Dutch Jews as well. The Jewish Council was informed on 26 June 1942 that all Jews between ages 16 and 40 would be deported to Germany for labor, with a requirement to produce 800 names per day. The first notices were sent on 5 July, causing a scramble for exemptions and deferments. One day prior, German authorities rounded up 700 Jews at random, including children and babies. This group was held as hostages to enforce the order.

Rauter sent progress letters to Himmler, informing him in September 1942 that "In all of Holland some 120,000 Jews [including "mixed Jews"] are being readied for departure."

Below are a sample of deportations from The Netherlands to labor and extermination camps.

Year	Number	From	To	Survivors
14 Sept 1941	103	Enschede, Hengelo, Almelo, Oldenzaal	Mauthausen	
1941–1942	1700	Amsterdam	Mauthausen	
1941–1942	100	Amsterdam	Buchenwald, Dachau, Neuengamme	
15 July 1942 – 23 February 1943	42915	Westerbork	Auschwitz	85
28 August – 12 December 1942	3540	Unknown	Various labor camps (see nl:Coseltransporten)	181
2 March – 20 July 1943	34313	Unknown	Sobibor	19
24 August 1943 – 3 September 1944	11985	Westerbork	Auschwitz	588
15 November 1943 – 3 June 1944	1645	Vught	Auschwitz	198
1943–1944	4870	Amsterdam and Westerbork	Theresienstadt	1950
October 1943	150	Westerbork	Buchenwald and Ravensbrück	
1944	3751	Westerbork	Bergen-Belsen	2050

In all, 107,000 Jews were deported from prisons in Germany and the Netherlands to concentration camps. Of these, only 5,200 survived. In total 102,000 Jews were murdered by the Nazis (three-quarters of the pre-war Jewish population of the country). Some were native Dutch, and others were refugees who had sought asylum in the Netherlands.

As a consequence of the involvement of Dutch transport companies in the transportation of Jews during World War II, the City of Amsterdam and the Municipal Transport Company (GVB) decided to place permanent memorials at three Amsterdam streetcar stops where Jewish citizens of Amsterdam were deported.

== Death toll and contributing factors ==
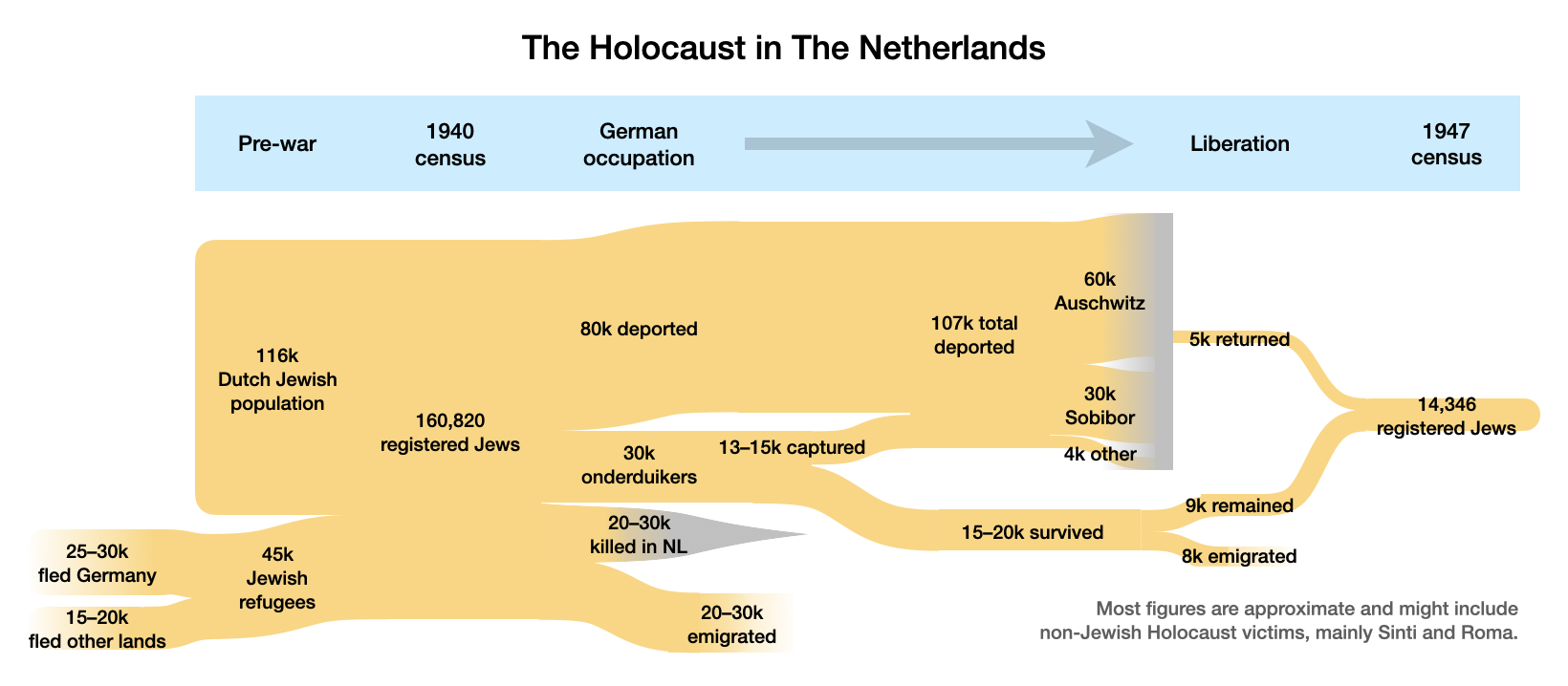
Sankey diagram of the Jewish population of The Netherlands during World War II

In 1939, there were some 140,000 Jews living in the Netherlands, among them tens of thousands of refugees: some sources state 24,000–25,000 Jews had fled Germany in the 1930s, while others state that about 34,000 Jews entered The Netherlands from Germany and Austria between 1933 and 1940.

In 1945, only about 35,000 Dutch Jews were alive, many of whom emigrated to British Mandate of Palestine (present-day Israel) and other countries; the 1947 census reported only 14,346 Jews, or 10% of the pre-war population. 34,379 "full Jews" are estimated to have survived the Holocaust, of whom 8,500 were part of mixed marriages, and thus spared deportation. Another 14,545 "half Jews" and 5,990 "quarter Jews" are estimated to have survived.

Several factors contributed to The Netherlands' higher death toll compared to other occupied countries. The governmental apparatus was left relatively intact after the royal family and government fled to London, and The Netherlands was not under a military regime. It was the most densely inhabited country of Western Europe, making it difficult for the relatively large number of Jews to go into hiding. Some 80 thousand were concentrated in Amsterdam, and most of these were poor, which limited their options for fleeing or hiding. They were advised by the "Joodse Raad", led by notable Jews, to follow German orders. The country did not have much open space or forest for people to flee to. Also, the civil administration had detailed records of the numbers of Jews, and their addresses.

It is not entirely clear how much the average citizen of the Netherlands was aware of the operation of death camps for most of the Occupation. All Dutch citizens were required to "register" for work in Germany. Initially, Dutch society recognized German persecution of the Jews, they conducted the first act of mass civil disobedience in Nazi-occupied Europe: the Februaristaking ("February strike"), to show their support for Jewish citizens. The Nazis moved swiftly to suppress further citizen action and there was no further public action after the top Nazi official, Reichskommissar Seyss-Inquart, warned the Dutch public that there would be draconian consequences.

One theory is that the Germans made use of the administrative organizations and Dutch police:

"In their preparations for the extermination of the Jews living in the Netherlands, the Germans could count on the assistance of the greater part of the Dutch administrative infrastructure. The occupiers had to employ only a relatively limited number of their own personnel; Dutch policemen rounded up the families to be sent to their deaths in Eastern Europe. Trains of the Dutch railways staffed by Dutch employees transported the Jews to camps in the Netherlands which were transit points to Auschwitz, Sobibor, and other death camps." With respect to Dutch collaboration, Eichmann is quoted as saying "The transports run so smoothly that it is a pleasure to see."

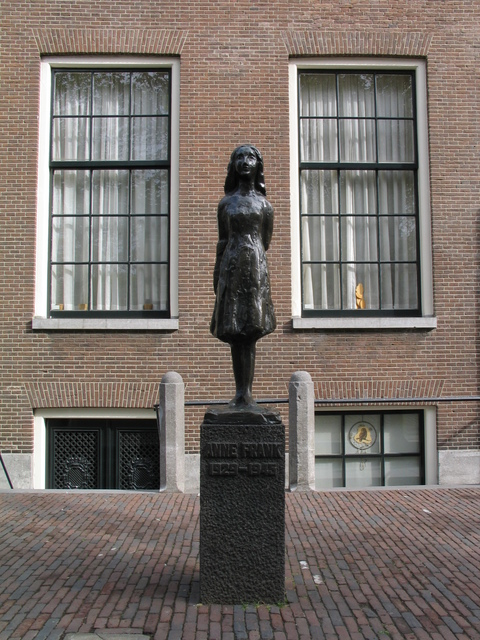
This statue in Amsterdam commemorates Anne Frank, who went into hiding with her German-Jewish refugee family during the Second World War. They were found and transported. Her father survived and later published her diary.

The best-known of the Holocaust victims in the Netherlands is Anne Frank, a German Jewish refugee. Along with her sister, Margot Frank, she died from typhus in March 1945 in the concentration camp of Bergen-Belsen. Disease was widespread in the camps because of unsanitary living conditions deliberately created by the German occupiers. Anne Frank's mother, Edith Frank-Holländer, was murdered by starvation in Auschwitz. Her father, Otto Frank, survived the war. Other noted Dutch victims of the Holocaust include Etty Hillesum, whose writings were later published; Abraham Icek Tuschinski, and Edith Stein, who converted to Christianity and is also known as Saint Teresa Benedicta of the Cross.

Maurice Frankenhuis built a collection of documents, authored diaries and collected artifacts spanning five decades, from World War I through World War II including hiding, and incarceration in Westerbork and Theresienstadt. His research revealed that he, together with his wife and two daughters may have been the only native Dutch family to survive as a unit.

== Postwar ==
Many Holocaust survivors returned home to find new families in their homes who were unwilling to return them. Jews found liberation to be bittersweet. Sem Goudsmit wrote in his diary:

The neighbours are celebrating. Yesterday and today, day and night. Music is playing, everyone’s singing loudly the merry and sentimental songs. 95,000 innocent dead in Auschwitz, 95,000 of their countrymen who would have wanted to see this, will not return to their city, their homes – the families have been destroyed, burned, their heaped ashes in the foreign place they were dragged off to.

Many Dutch municipalities required returning Holocaust survivors to pay overdue taxes.

As of 2025 the Jewish population of The Netherlands is between 29,000 and 41,000. This is less than a third of the pre-war Jewish population, even though the overall Dutch population has more than doubled.

241 Germans were tried in The Netherlands for war crimes and crimes against humanity. Six were sentenced to life imprisonment, while eighteen received the death penalty, of whom five were executed. Four individuals were convicted in absentia and never apprehended. The sentences of the remaining nine were commuted. The last remaining prisoners were released in 1989 and both died the same year; see The Breda Four.

Yad Vashem, the Holocaust memorial in Israel, has honored more than 6,000 Dutch nationals for helping Jews evade capture—second only to Poland, whose wartime population was four times greater.

Many Dutch municipalities have yet to fully investigate instances of German looting.

=== Controversy about Jewish orphans ===
In the immediate aftermath of World War II, a controversy arose concerning the Jewish children who survived their parents during the Holocaust. The children were often hidden by the Dutch Resistance with non-Jewish families. One scholar of the controversy contends that "The history of the Jewish war orphans in the Netherlands, while part of the post war era, represents a direct continuation of the Holocaust and its prolonged aftermath of human suffering." When the Nazis began to vigorously implement deportation of Jews from the Netherlands, Jews allowed members of the Resistance to place many children with non-Jewish families; they survived the war when their parents did not. Jewish children could be more easily hidden than Jewish adults, so a disproportionate number of the Jews who survived were children. "[T]his type of rescue operation could be organized on a serious scale." How these young survivors should be considered in the postwar era created a controversy between Resistance members and Jewish adults surviving the Holocaust, who wished to rebuild the Dutch Jewish community. These two groups had different visions of the children's future; each considered themselves making better decisions for their guardianship. Resistance fighters' role in hiding children during the war earned them legal standing with the Dutch governmental commission established to determine their fate. Children were often smuggled out of Amsterdam to many other places in the Netherlands, where they were integrated into existing non-Jewish families. In the postwar period, the Dutch government established principles to consider the welfare of the children that recognized the role of the Dutch resistance. The assumptions the Commission for War Foster Children made to determine guardianship were that the parents were not returning; the status of children was equivalent to abandoned or neglected offspring, not orphans; members of the Resistance had legal standing on the commission, while Dutch Jews were invited to join the commission only as individuals, not representatives of a group. The commission did not recognize the children's being Jewish as relevant to their placement, and that their individual welfare was a Dutch matter, not a Jewish matter. For Dutch Jews, the way that the commission was conceived and functioned was as an adversary." One hidden child's story is part of the permanent exhibition at the Resistance Museum in Amsterdam. Ellen Mieke Olman was separated from her parents at nine months, and fostered by a Christian family. After the war she was reunited with her biological mother, a person of whom she had no memory and subsequently had a difficult relationship. "I called my mother 'ma'am'".

=== Historical memory and memorials ===
In contrast to many other countries where all aspects of Jewish communities and culture were eradicated during the Shoah, a remarkably large proportion of rabbinic records survived in Amsterdam, making the history of Dutch Jewry unusually well documented.

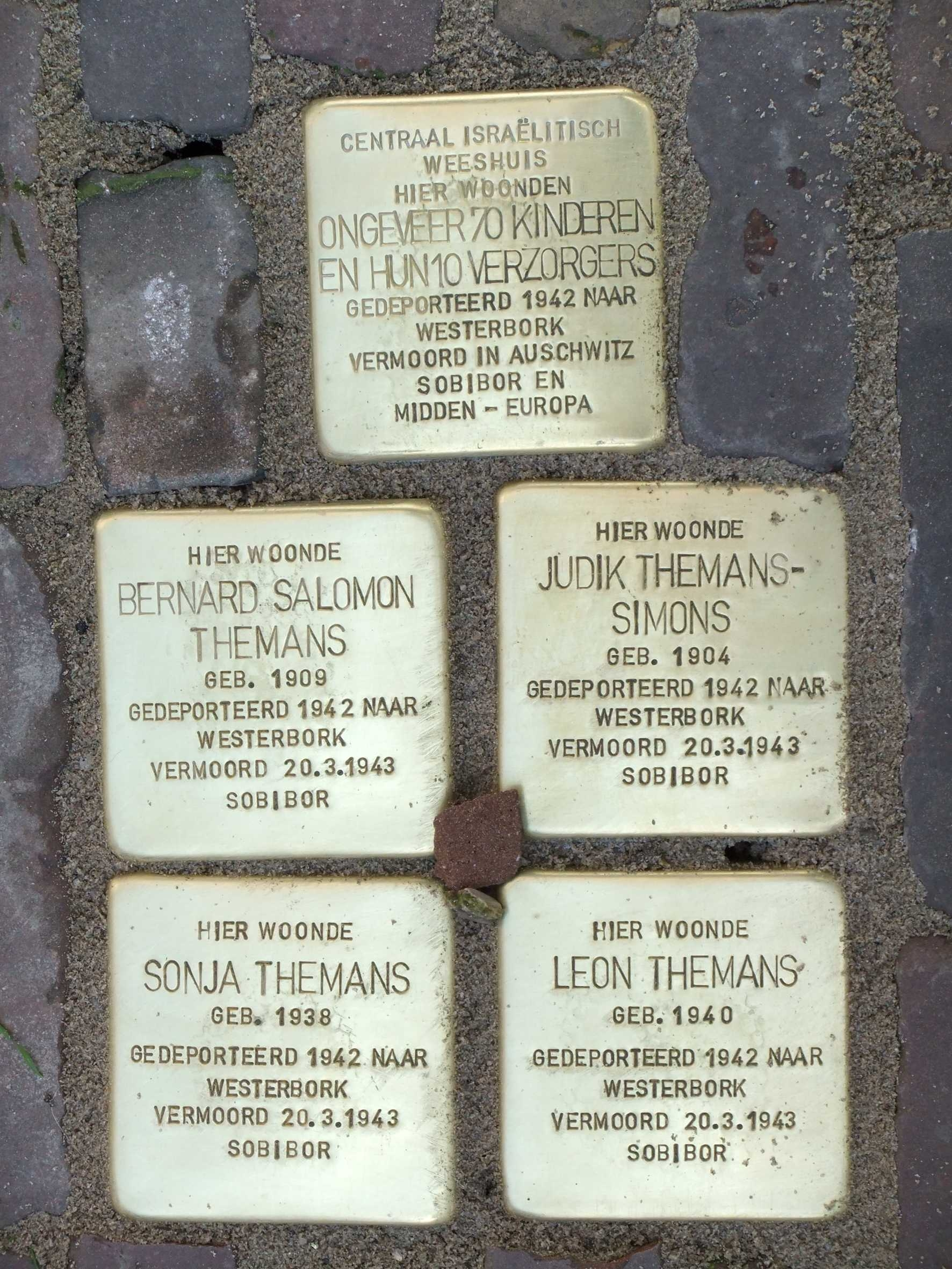
Stumble stones (stolpersteine) in Utrecht

In the postwar period, Holocaust memorials were created in many places directly under Nazi control and there are now scholarly works on the holocaust in historical memory. The Netherlands has been part of this process of memorialization and scholarly assessment. The Dutch government established National Holocaust Remembrance Day as the last Sunday in January, while a number of countries fix the commemorations date at January 27, the anniversary of the liberation of the Auschwitz death camp. The Netherlands figures in comparative studies of memorialization of the Holocaust The changes over time of memorialization in the Netherlands has been the subject of study. The Resistance Museum in Amsterdam, founded in 1984 by members of the Dutch resistance, tells the complicated story of the Nazi occupation of the Netherlands and the varieties of Dutch response to the Nazis' policies resulting in the annihilation of three-quarters of Dutch Jews. The museum catalogue published a catalogue of the new permanent collection in 2023.

There are various types of Holocaust memorialization including a digital archive of Dutch Holocaust victims' names. The built urban environment of Dutch cities has incorporated Holocaust memorials, with a list of giving locations. In Amsterdam, Anne Frank House has become an important site of memory, one of the few that focuses on a single individual to tell a much larger story. Some other sites of memory in Amsterdam have a much lower profile. Scholars study Holocaust sites of commemoration in the Netherlands, examining visitors' motivations for seeking them out and their emotional responses.

Historical conceptions of the Holocaust in the Netherlands are dynamic, with an examination of the Dutch Resistance. A study of Holocaust memorials examines the conception of the Holocaust perpetrators. Holocaust aftermath memory in Dutch education is a subject of concern. As the Netherlands has become a multiethnic society, scholars have examined historical memory of the Holocaust of different ethnic groups. There is also scholarly work on the Holocaust in the Netherlands and conceptions of Dutch decolonization.

== See also ==
- Dutch National Holocaust Museum
- History of the Jews in the Netherlands
- History of the Jews in Amsterdam
- National Holocaust Names Memorial (Amsterdam)
- Kamp Amersfoort National Monument
- Kamp Amersfoort
- Kamp Vught
- National Monument Camp Vught
- Battle of the Netherlands
- Israel–Netherlands relations
- List of Dutch Jews
- List of Jews deported from Wageningen (1942–43)
- Mediene
- Righteous Among the Nations
- The Holocaust in Belgium
- The Holocaust in France
- Reichskommissariat Niederlande
- Yad Vashem
