= Wittenberg (surname) =

Wittenberg is a surname, and may refer to:

- Arvid Wittenberg (1606–1657), Swedish field marshal
- Beata Magdalena Wittenberg (1644–1705), Swedish courtier
- Casey Wittenberg (born 1984), American golfer
- Curt Wittenberg, American biologist
- Dave Wittenberg (born 1971), US–based voice actor
- Henry Wittenberg (1918–2010), American wrestler
- Jan Wittenberg (born 1943), Dutch sprint canoeist
- Jeff Wittenberg (born 1973), Australian rugby player
- John Wittenberg (1939–2005), Australian rugby player
- Jonathan Wittenberg (born 1957), Scottish rabbi
- Karl Wittenberg, German swimmer
- Marloes Wittenberg (born 1983), Dutch judoka
- Mary Wittenberg (born 1962), American sports executive
- Nicole Wittenberg (born 1979), American artist
- Robert Wittenberg, American politician from Michigan
- Ruth Wittenberg (1899–1990), American historic preservationist
- Yitzhak Wittenberg (1907–1943), Jewish resistance fighter

== See also ==
- Wittenberg (disambiguation)
