= Kurt Anderson =

Kurt Anderson or Curt Andersen may refer to:

== Anderson ==
=== Curt Anderson ===
- Curt Anderson (born 1949), American politician
- Curt Anderson (musician) (born 1984)

=== Kurt Anderson ===
- Kurt Anderson (American football) (born 1978), American football coach and former player
- Kurt Anderson (director), Martial Law (1991 film)

== Andersen ==
- Curt Andersen, columnist for the Green Bay News-Chronicle

=== Kurt Andersen ===
- Kurt Andersen (born 1954), American novelist and radio host
- Kurt Andersen (general) (1898–2003), Luftwaffe officer

== Andersson ==
- Curt Andersson (1937–2018), Swedish Olympic sport shooter
- Kurt Andersson (born 1939), Swedish soccer player

== See also ==
- Anderson (disambiguation)
- Andersen
- Andersson
- Anderssen
- Curt
- Kurt (disambiguation)
