= Curtis Anderson =

Curtis Anderson may refer to:

- Curtis Anderson (American football, born 1957), American football defensive end
- Curtis Anderson (American football, born 1973), American football cornerback
- Curtis Anderson (footballer) (born 2000), English footballer

== See also ==
- Kurt Anderson (disambiguation)
