= Liro Bank =

Dutch Jewish bank

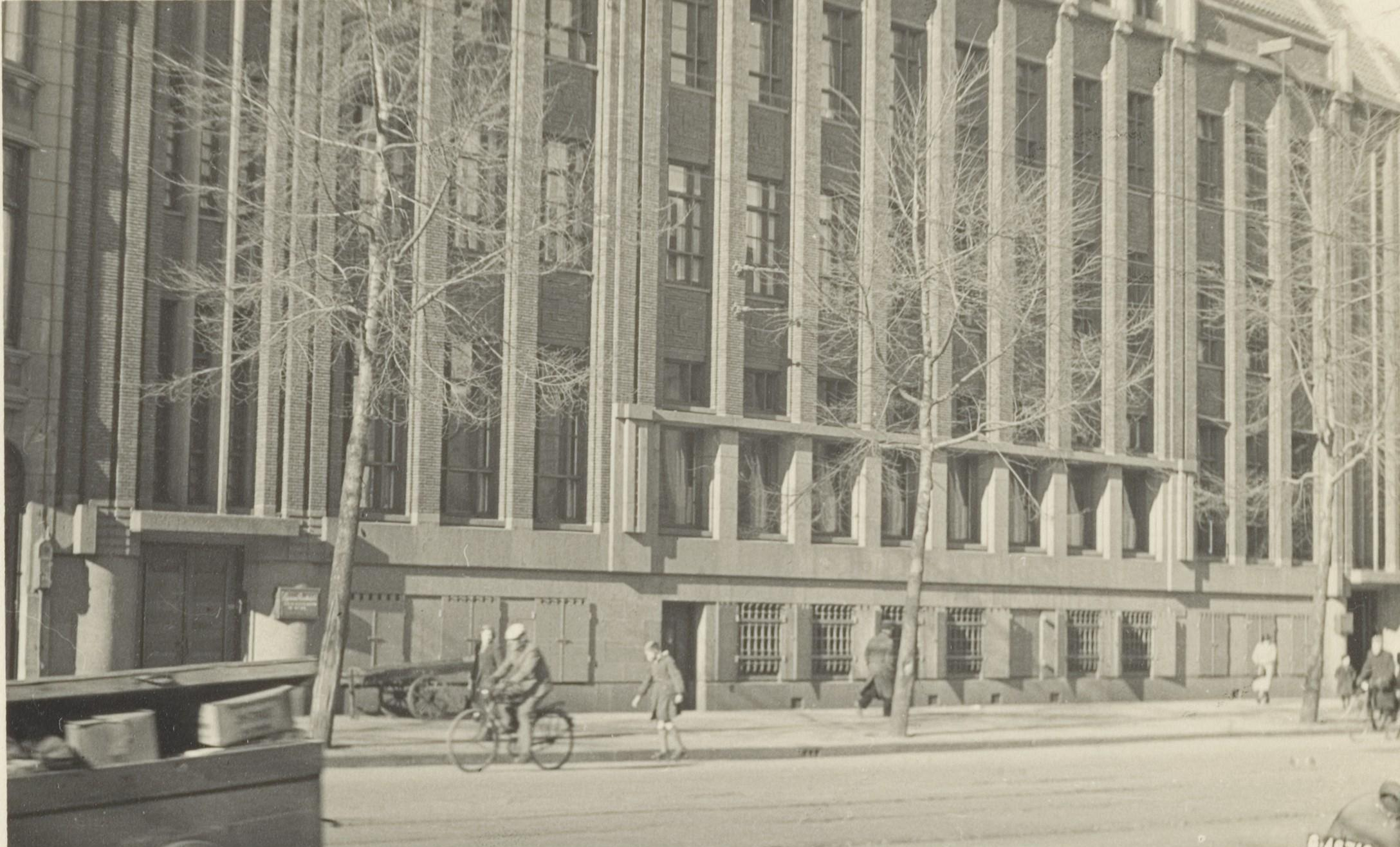
The 'Lippmann, Rosenthal & Co' building in the Sarphatistraat (March 1944).

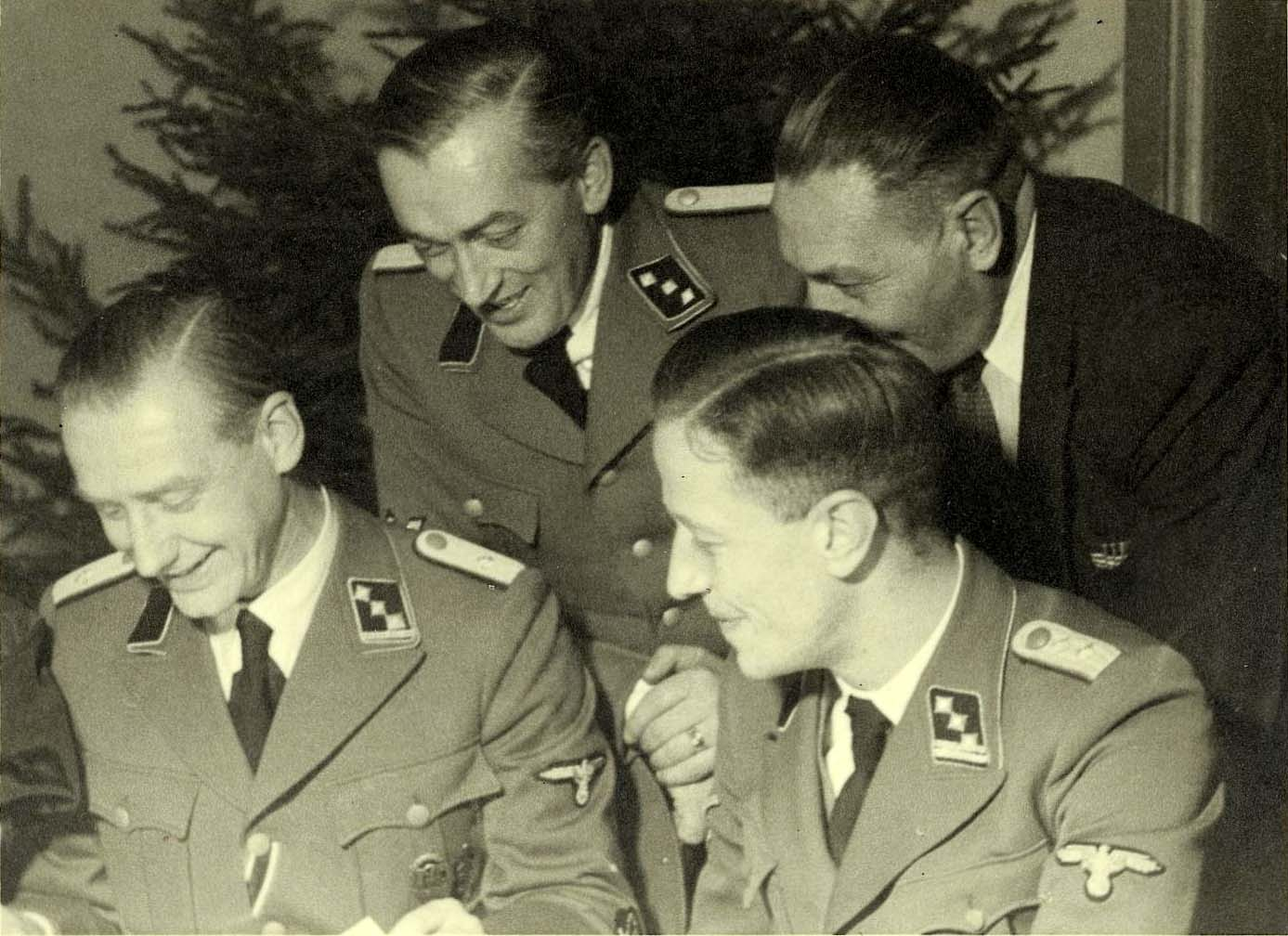
Westerbork 1942: Camp commandander Albert Konrad Gemmeker, SS Untersturmführer Hassel, Ferdinand aus der Fünten and Scheltnes of Lippmann, Rosenthal & Co

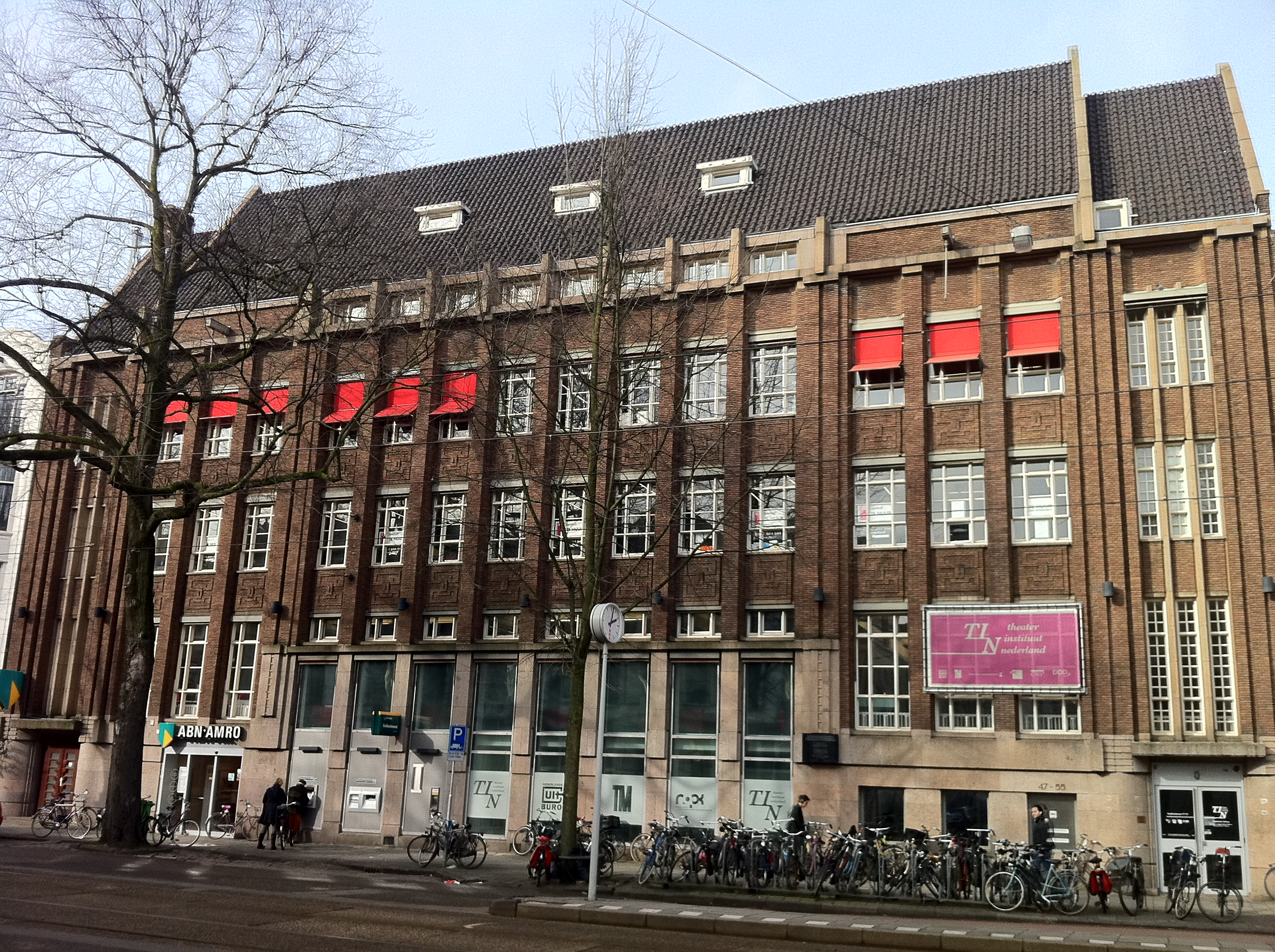
The building in Sarphatistraat in 2012

Lippmann, Rosenthal & Co. or Liro Bank, originally a Dutch Jewish bank, was seized and used by Nazis for looting Jewish property during the German occupation of the Netherlands during World War II.

At Nieuwe Spiegelstraat, in Amsterdam, the Germans used the bank's name for a separate branch for looting Jews at the Sarphatistraat.

The branch was used for robbing the Dutch Jews living mainly in Amsterdam of their possessions. Bank accounts at other banks were confiscated, and Jews were also forced to deposit their art collections, jewels, etc. at the bank. If a Jewish family was deported from their home, their possessions were sold. The money was used for various purposes such as to finance the Westerbork transit camp. High-level Nazis could pick from the art collections. In addition, important artworks were sent to German museums.

After the war, the original bank had lost its good name and was finally taken over by another bank, the Hollandse Koopmansbank.

In 2003, a plaque about the Nazi robber bank was unveiled on the building of the ABN Amro Bank in Amsterdam.

== See also ==
- List of claims for restitution for Nazi-looted art
- Arthur Seyss-Inquart
- The Holocaust in the Netherlands
- List of banks in the Netherlands
