= Wittenberg (disambiguation) =

Wittenberg is a town in Saxony-Anhalt, Germany.

Wittenberg may also refer to:

== Places ==
- Wittenberg (district), Saxony-Anhalt, Germany
- Wittenberg, the former German name for Białogóra, Pomerania, Poland
- Wittenberg, Missouri, US
- Wittenberg, New York, US, near Johns Mountain
- Wittenberg, Wisconsin, US, a village
- Wittenberg (town), Wisconsin, adjacent to the village
- Wittenberg Mountain, Ulster County, New York, US

== Other uses ==
- Wittenberg (surname)
- Wittenberg University, in Springfield, Ohio, US
- University of Wittenberg, now the University of Halle-Wittenberg in Halle, Saxony-Anhalt, Germany
- Wittenberg, a 2008 play by David Davalos

== See also ==
- Wittenberge in Brandenburg, Germany
- Wittenburg in Mecklenburg-Vorpommern, Germany
- Wittenburg, Nova Scotia
