= Curt Bloch =

German Jewish writer (1908 – 1975)

Kurt Bloch (1908 – 1975) was a German Jewish writer. While hiding in the Netherlands during the Holocaust, he wrote 95 issues of a satirical magazine about the Nazis in general and Hitler in particular, and Dutch collaboration with the Nazis.

== Life ==
Bloch was born in Dortmund. With Hitler's rise to power in 1933, Bloch fled to Amsterdam and found work with an importer and merchant of Persian carpets.

When the Germans invaded the Netherlands in 1940, Bloch was sent by the company that employed him to The Hague, but due to the restrictions imposed by the Germans on the employment of non-Dutch Jews, he was sent to Enschede, and found work in the local Jewish Council - an organization established by the Nazis to implement their decrees on the Jewish population. He was designated as a consultant for immigrant affairs, but soon the danger of deportation to a concentration camp loomed over him as well. He found refuge and shelter in the home of an undertaker named Bartos Menken and his wife Elida. The person who organized the hiding place for him was Leendert Overduin, a priest who founded a group that helped about a thousand Jews in that way. Together with another couple, they were given a hiding place in a narrow space in the attic, where they stayed from August 1943 until their liberation in 1945.

After the end of the war, Bloch returned to Amsterdam, where he met an Auschwitz survivor named Ruth Kahn, and the couple married there. In 1948 they moved to New York, where he died in 1975.

== Magazines ==
While hiding in Enschede, Bloch began producing a weekly magazine, The Underwater Cabaret, using materials that Dutch allies brought to them alongside food and other necessities. Bloch published 95 issues, each of which included original art, poetry and songs that were mostly aimed at the Nazis and their collaborators among the Dutch.

Although Bloch was confined to the attic, he made efforts to share his work with others living in hiding. The magazines were distributed among the people with whom he shared the hidden "studio". The magazines may also have been brought to other Jews in hiding via Dutch allies, offering them a glimpse of hope and a momentary escape from the harsh reality they faced. If so, then the "underwater cabaret" would have played a vital role in fostering a sense of unity and resilience among those oppressed by the Nazis.

The title “Onderwater-Cabaret” was inspired by the Dutch word “onderduiken” (go into hiding), which would literally translate into English as “to dive under”. Onderduiken used in Dutch is strongly associated with people hiding for German occupiers during WWII – mainly referring to Jews but also to members of the resistance and other persecuted population groups.

The last issue is from April 3, 1945, the day Enschede was liberated. That last issue was a photomontage of two people climbing out through a hatch. The headline of the issue proclaims that they are finally "above water".

In 1948, Bloch collected the magazines and moved them to his home in New York.

== Legacy ==
After Bloch's death in 1975, his magazines went largely unnoticed by his family until his granddaughter found them and began doing research on them. She went on to sponsor a publication tracing their history and the sources of his writing and art. Her research led to the publication of a book, "The Underwater Cabaret: Kurt Bloch's Satirical Resistance", by Gerard Groeneveld, which was published in the Netherlands at the end of 2023.

At the same time, the daughter of Curt Bloch contacted German designer and author Thilo von Debschitz. He developed the website curt-bloch.com with an international team and his agency Q. Supported by funds from German Rotary Clubs, private individuals, and foundations, the site offers extensive access to the magazines and poems of Curt Bloch. Thilo von Debschitz also reactivated a contact with the Jewish Museum Berlin dating back to 2014 between the museum and the Bloch family; subsequently, the family agreed to hand over the journals to the museum, which opened the exhibition "My verses are like dynamite – Curt Bloch’s Het Onderwater Cabaret" on February 8.
