= Leendert Overduin =

Dutch minister and resistance fighter

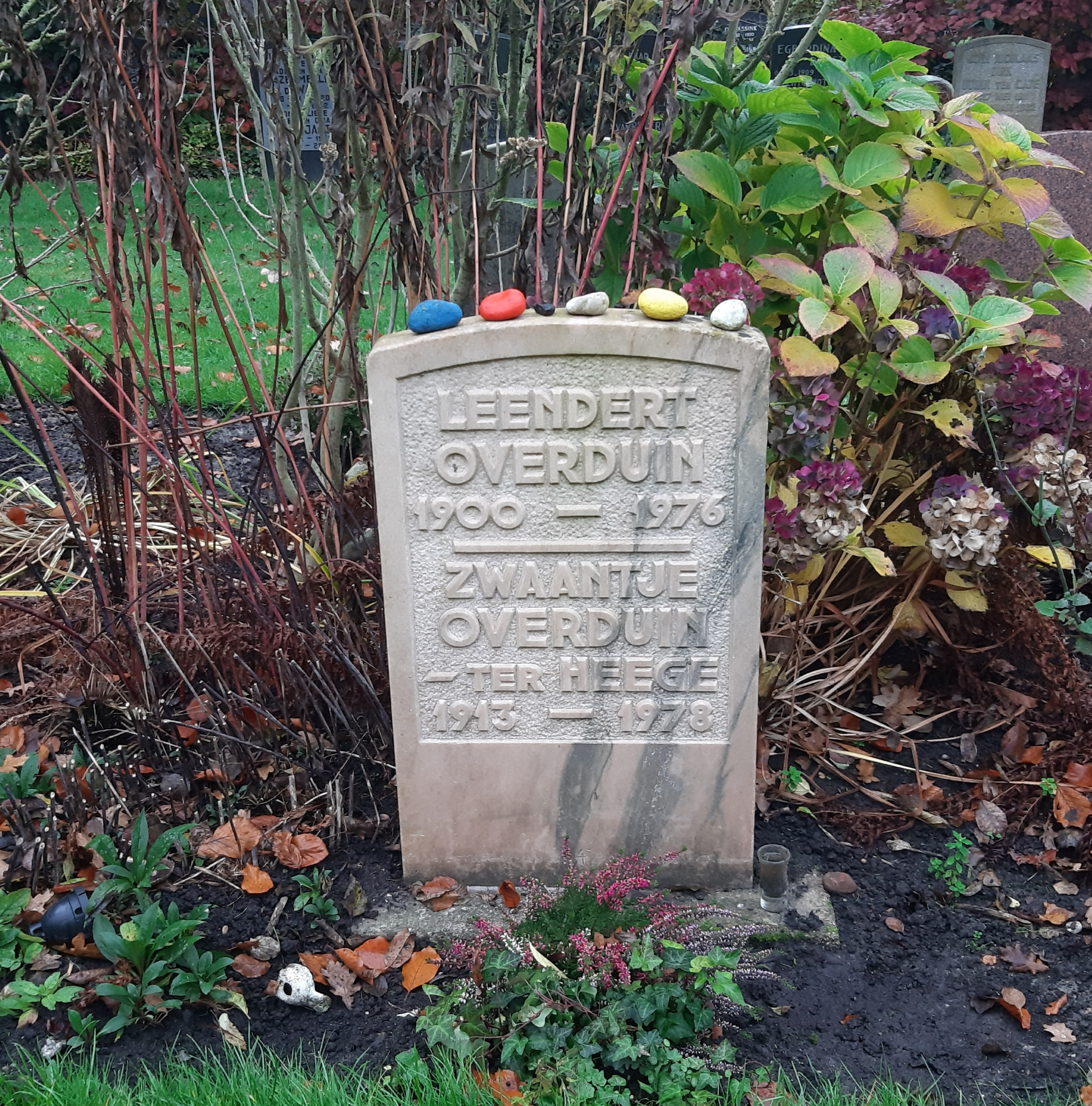
Grave of Leendert Overduin in Enschede

Leendert Overduin (Leiden, 22 December 1900 - Enschede, 17 July 1976) was a pastor of the Reformed Church in Restored Dependency who helped rescue Jews during the Holocaust in the Netherlands.

Overduin was a pastor in Enschede and during the Second World War he became the leader of the first and largest organisation for helping Jewish fellow citizens. After the war, he devoted himself to the children of parents involved in the NSB.

After the raid of Twente, on 13 September 1941, which was the result of cutting telephone cables in protest against the oppressor, when 105 Jewish men from various towns in Twente were rounded up and transported to Mauthausen, three people asked Overduin if they could go into hiding at his house. Overduin agreed and the group grew quickly. He could not place them all at his own house so he went searching for other places to hide. This was the beginning of Group Overduin, a resistance group that within a year consisted of 50 people who saved at least a thousand Jews.

In 2021, a documentary about Overduin was made by Willy Berends and Cars Bijlstra and can be seen on YouTube. Since 2024 it is also available in English.
