= Nicole Wittenberg =

American artist based in New York City

Nicole Wittenberg (born 1979) is an American artist based in New York City. She is a curator, professor, writer, and painter.

Wittenberg’s works are included in many collections, including the Solomon R. Guggenheim Museum, New York, NY; The Albertina, Vienna, Austria; the Boston Museum of Fine Art, Boston, MA; and others. Exhibitions include The Female Gaze, Part Two: Women Look at Men at Cheim & Read Gallery, New York, NY; Painter's Painters: Gifts from Alex Katz, High Museum of Art Atlanta, GA; and In Her Hands, Skarstedt Gallery, New York, NY.

== Formation ==
Wittenberg was born in San Francisco, CA, and received her BFA from the San Francisco Art Institute in 2003. She received the American Academy of Arts and Letters John Koch Award for Best Young Figurative Painter in 2012. From 2011–2014 she served as a teacher at the New York Studio School of Drawing, Painting and Sculpture, and the Bruce High Quality Foundation University, and in 2017, she was a professor in the Critical Theory Department at the School of Visual Arts in New York City.

== Work ==
Wittenberg's work includes paintings, drawings, and pastels depicting figures, landscapes, and scenes drawn from observation and visual source material. Her landscape works have depicted locations such as Maine, the Aegean Sea, and the Savannah Sound. Her use of pastel has been described as emphasizing chromatic intensity and luminosity. Wittenberg has said that the works are "about sensation—the feeling of people, places, and things" and that she wanted to record them quickly and in high chroma.

This emotive quality of the drawings carries into her oil paintings, but they require a different approach. Because oil paints are relatively transparent compared to pastels, Wittenberg experimented with adding various opaque grounds to the paintings until she achieved the desired luminosity. The technique produces canvases that glow as though they are charged with the scene’s light.

Though Wittenberg has recently focused on landscapes and portraits in nature, her practice has always aligned with a sensual familiarity with life. While in school at San Francisco Art Institute, she began making drawings from slow-motion videos, life models, and photographs. In 2014, that interest in photographic and pop-culture references extended to pornography, and inspired Wittenberg to begin painting from amateur porn.

Curator and painter David Salle praised her commitment to reinventing realism with more brute force than her predecessors or contemporaries. "People think everything's been done, but that's not true." "[Wittenberg] dares herself to do precisely that which scares her."

Wittenberg further sets herself apart from the history of nude painting by depicting sexually aroused men instead of the conventional objectified female form. Sexualized men are underrepresented, almost taboo in art history.

When discussing her observation-based work, Wittenberg says that “the biggest challenge is to trust what I see, even when it conflicts with what I think I see... Often, reality contrasts to how I think things should look.” Wittenberg relies on her eyes to recreate what she sees in the world, finding that backlit spring leaves need an acidic yellow to bring out their natural vibrance, or that a sunset calls for neon pink to brighten the layers of translucent oil paint.

== Personal life ==
As of 2025, she works in Manhattan in New York City.

== Exhibitions ==
- All the Way, Acquavella Galleries, New York, NY, 2025
- Our Love is Here to Stay, Acquavella Galleries, Palm Beach, FL, 2023
- Sunday Kind of Love, Nina Johnson Gallery, Miami, FL, 2020
- In Her Hands, curated by David Salle, Skarstedt Gallery, NYC, 2020
- Downtown Painting, Peter Freeman Gallery, NYC, 2019
- Look! New Acquisitions at the Albertina, Vienna, Austria, 2017
- Will You Still Love Me Tomorrow, Galerie Lisa Kandlhofer, Vienna, Austria, 2017
- The Female Gaze, Part Two: Women Look at Men, Cheim Read Gallery, NYC, 2016
- DICKS, Fortnight Institute, NYC, 2016
- Nice Weather, curated by David Salle, Skarstedt Gallery, NYC, 2016
- A Stay in the Paphos Loop, Offspace.xyz, NYC, 2016
- Painter's Painters: Gifts from Alex Katz, High Museum of Art Atlanta, GA, 2015
- Night Tide, curated by Jarrett Earnest, Gallery Diet, Miami, FL, 2014
- Come Together: Surviving Sandy, Year 1, 2013
- The Malingerers, Freight+Volume, New York, NY, 2012
- Invitational Exhibition of Visual Arts, New York, NY, 2012
- Brucennial, New York, NY, 2012
- The Fitting Room, Vogt Gallery, New York, NY, 2011

== Permanent Collections ==
Works by this artist can be seen at:

- Albertina, Vienna, Austria
- Aishti Foundation, Beirut, Lebanon
- Solomon R. Guggenheim Museum, New York, NY
- High Museum of Art, Atlanta, GA
- Museum of Fine Arts, Boston, MA
- Colby College Museum of Art, Waterville, ME
- Bowdoin College Museum of Art, Brunswick, ME
- Farnsworth Art Museum, Rockland, ME
- Portland Museum of Art, Portland, ME
