= Kamp Amersfoort National Monument =

Coordinates: 52.1323°N 5.3653°E

National Monument Amersfoort Camp
- Nationaal Monument Kamp Amersfoort
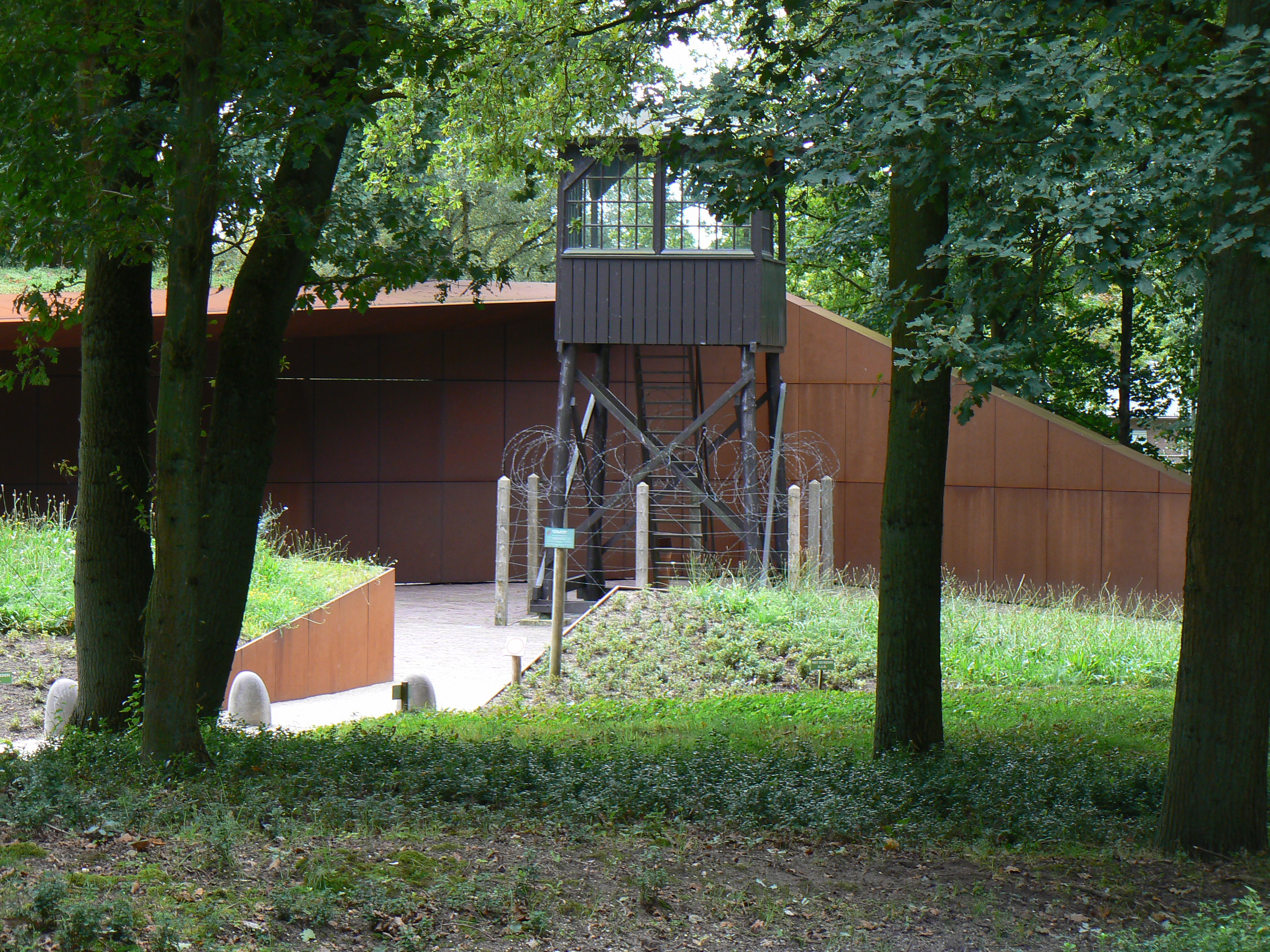
- Kamp Amersfoort - Watch Tower
- Established: March 28, 2000
- Location: Leusden
- Type: Memorial
- Parking: On site
- Website: https://www.kampamersfoort.nl/en/

National Monument Kamp Amersfoort is a museum focusing on the 47,000 people who were imprisoned in Kamp Amersfoort during World War II. It was the longest operating concentration camp in the German-occupied Netherlands.

By 2021, the underground museum was opened to include a permanent exhibition and an annually changing exhibition. Using objects, documents and visual material, the museum highlights the structural system of hunger, forced labour, beatings, transports and executions. The indoor area includes the original roll call clock and five wartime trees. In the outdoor area are several monuments and the Shooting Range, which was dug out by hand by prisoners. Near the museum entrance is an authentic watchtower.

== History ==
In 1953, the monumental statue Man before the firing squad was unveiled, better known as The stone man by Frits Sieger. The site of Kamp Amersfoort was reused after the war by the Ministry of Defense and as a training institute for the police, for which all the barracks were demolished. It was not until 28 March 2000 that the National Monument Kamp Amersfoort Foundation was established, with the aim of preserving the remains of Kamp Amersfoort and promoting the former camp site as a place of remembrance, commemoration and reflection. The initiative came from former prisoner Gerrit Kleinveld and second-generation representative Cees Biezeveld, who became its first director. The foundation's logo, a rose surrounded by barbed wire, recalls the former punishment site called rose garden and is based on two drawings by former prisoner Jacques Kopinsky. A modest memorial centre was opened in 2004.

== Annual commemoration ==
On 19 April, the liberation of Kamp Amersfoort is commemorated every year: on that date in 1945, management of the camp was transferred to the Red Cross. On 4 May, an afternoon and evening programme commemorates the dead; 652 people died in Kamp Amersfoort as a result of executions, ill-treatment or exhaustion, and 15% of the men who were put on transport to other camps as forced labourers or prisoners of punishment died. On 11 October, the Journey of Fear and Hope took place, following the route to the railway station. The largest transport of 1,438 men took place on 11 October 1944 to Neuengamme, 82 % of whom never returned. There are also smaller commemorations, including on 20 March on Appelweg and on 16 October in Woudenberg.

National Monument Kamp Amersfoort has 10 paid staff and 140 volunteers. The current director is Micha Bruinvels. National Monument Kamp Amersfoort produced the award-winning podcast The disappeared SS'er and publishes research results in the biannual digital magazine InBeeld and in the research series History of a Place.

== Gallery ==
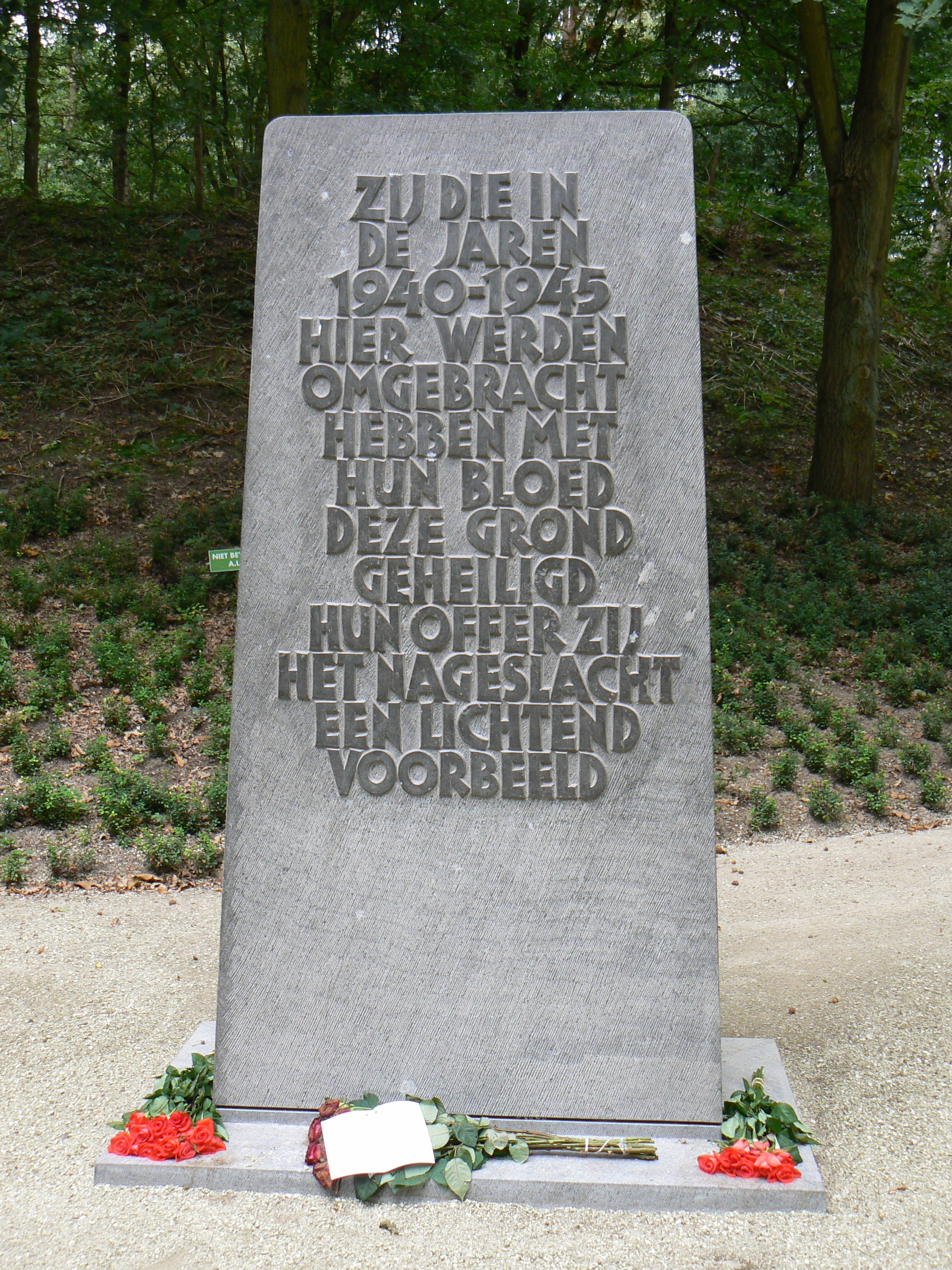
Memorial stone (1952)

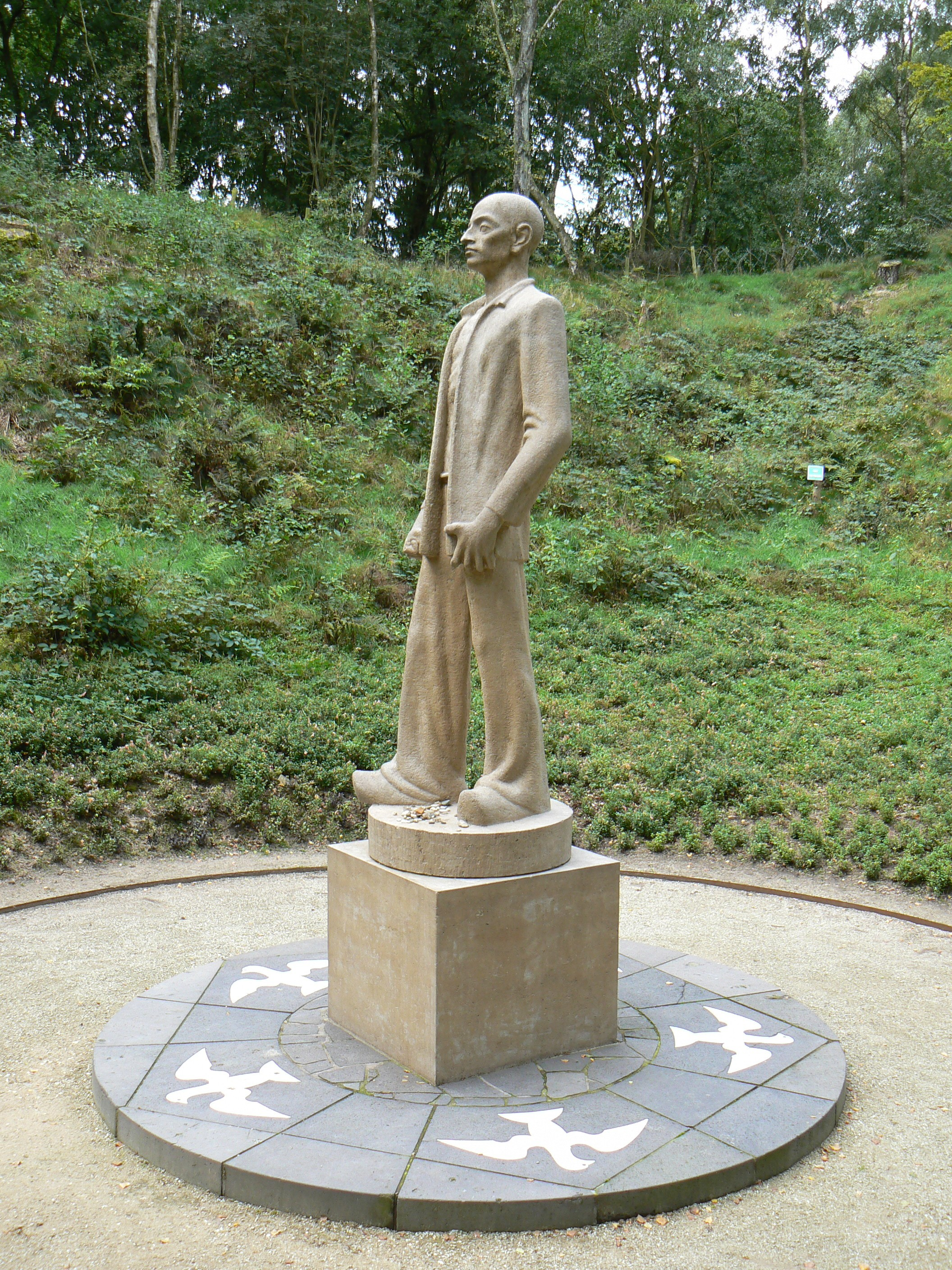
National Monument ‘The stone man’ (1953)

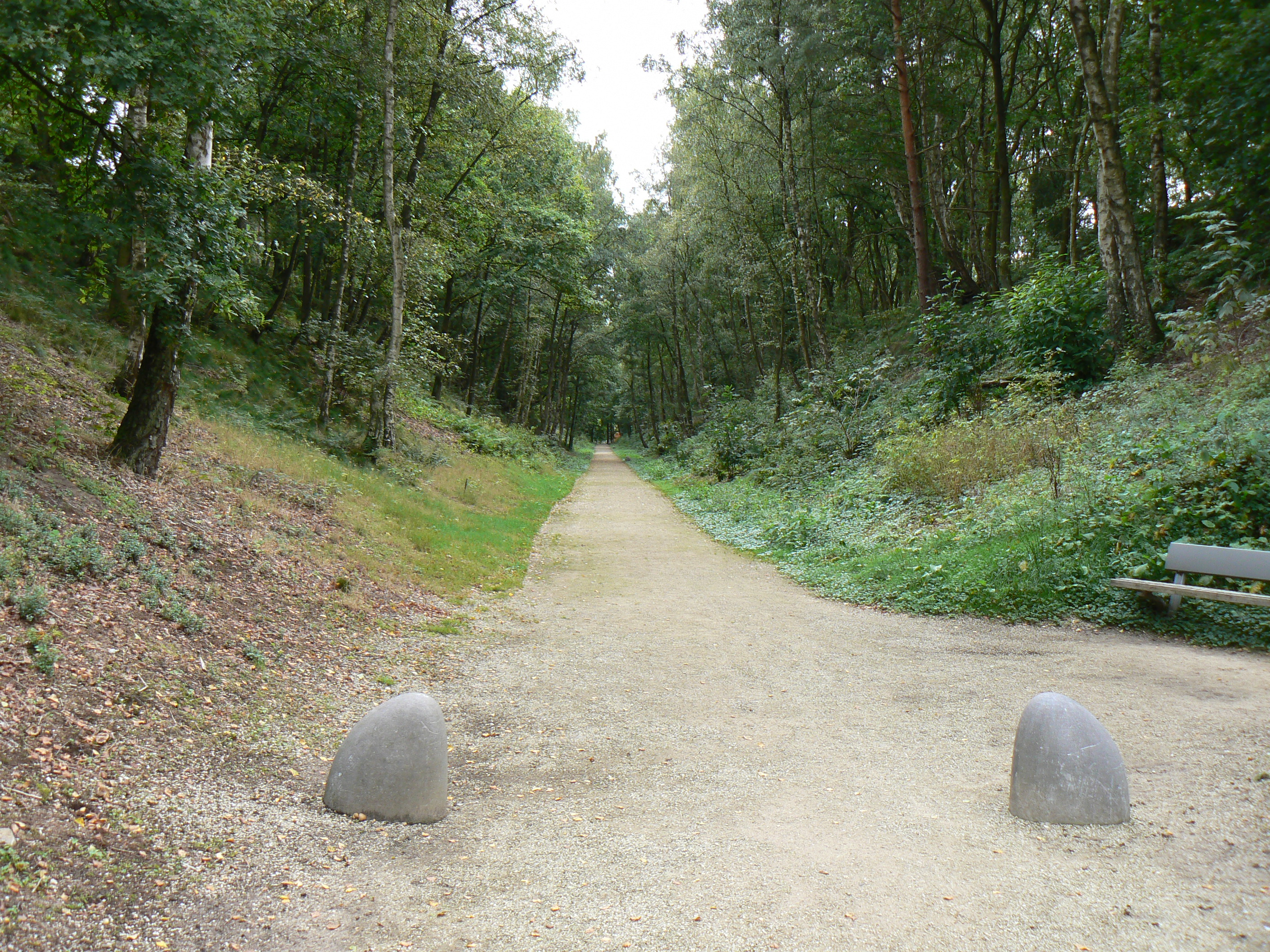
Former shooting range

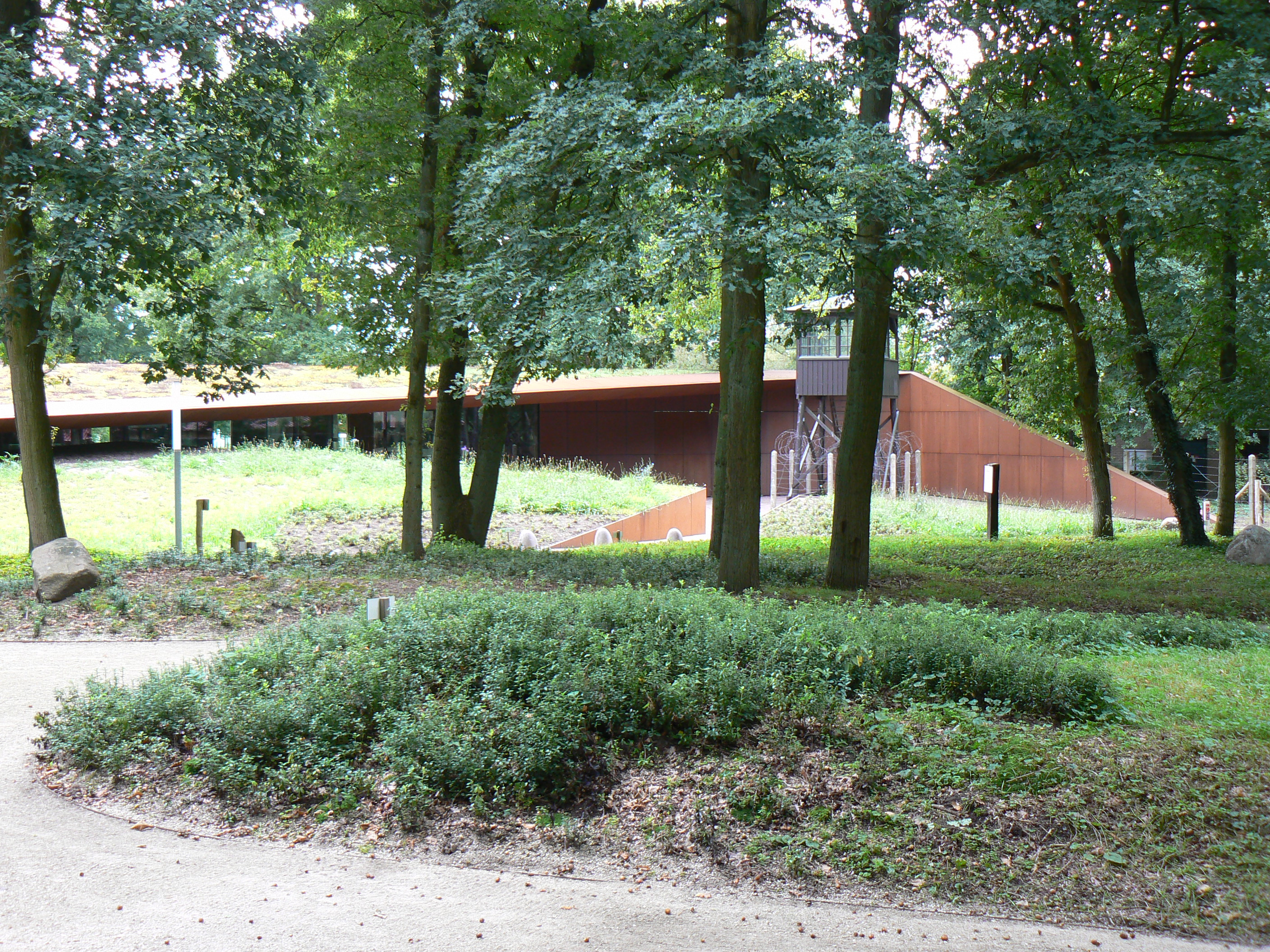
Overview

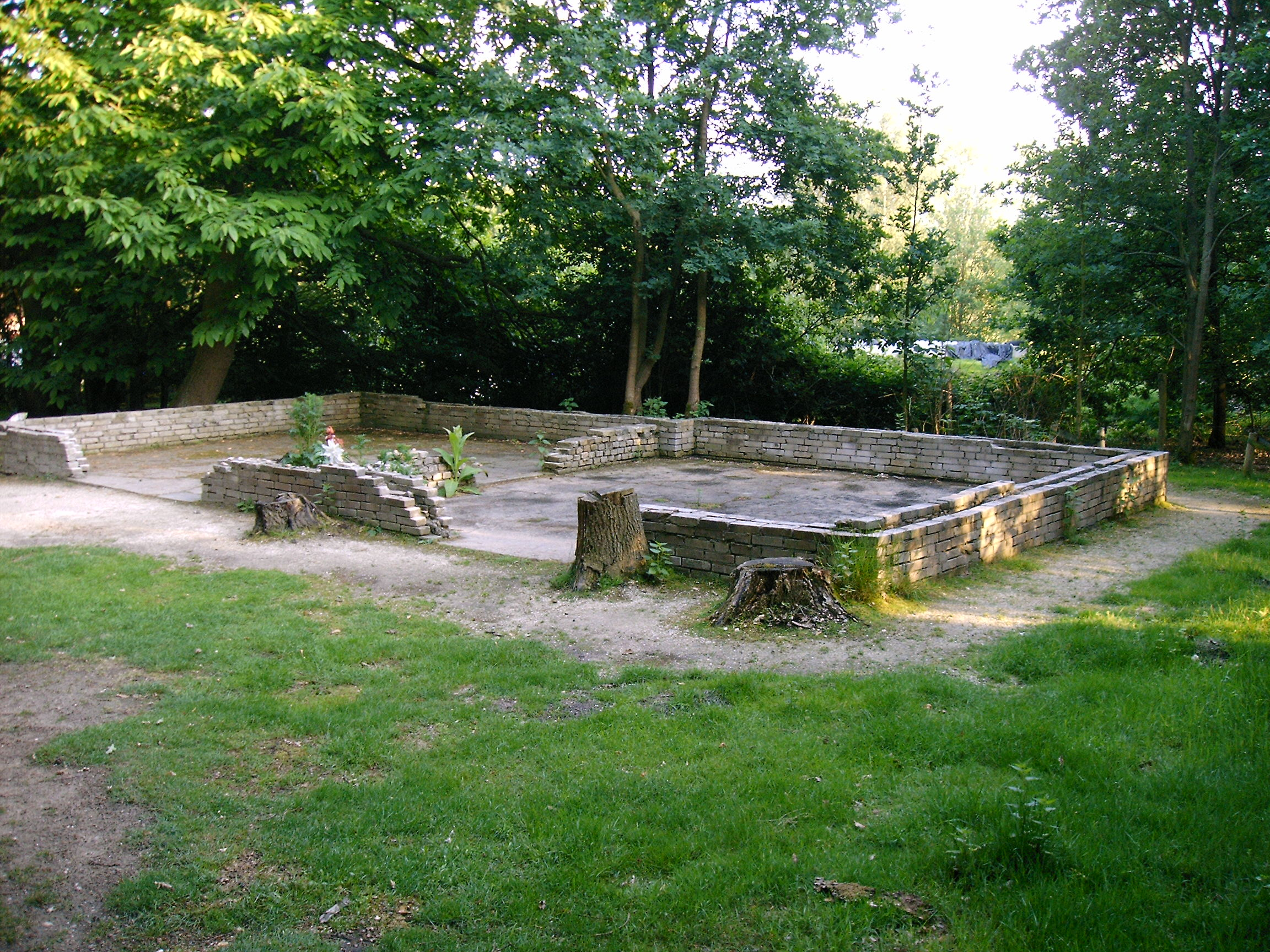
Remains of the morgues

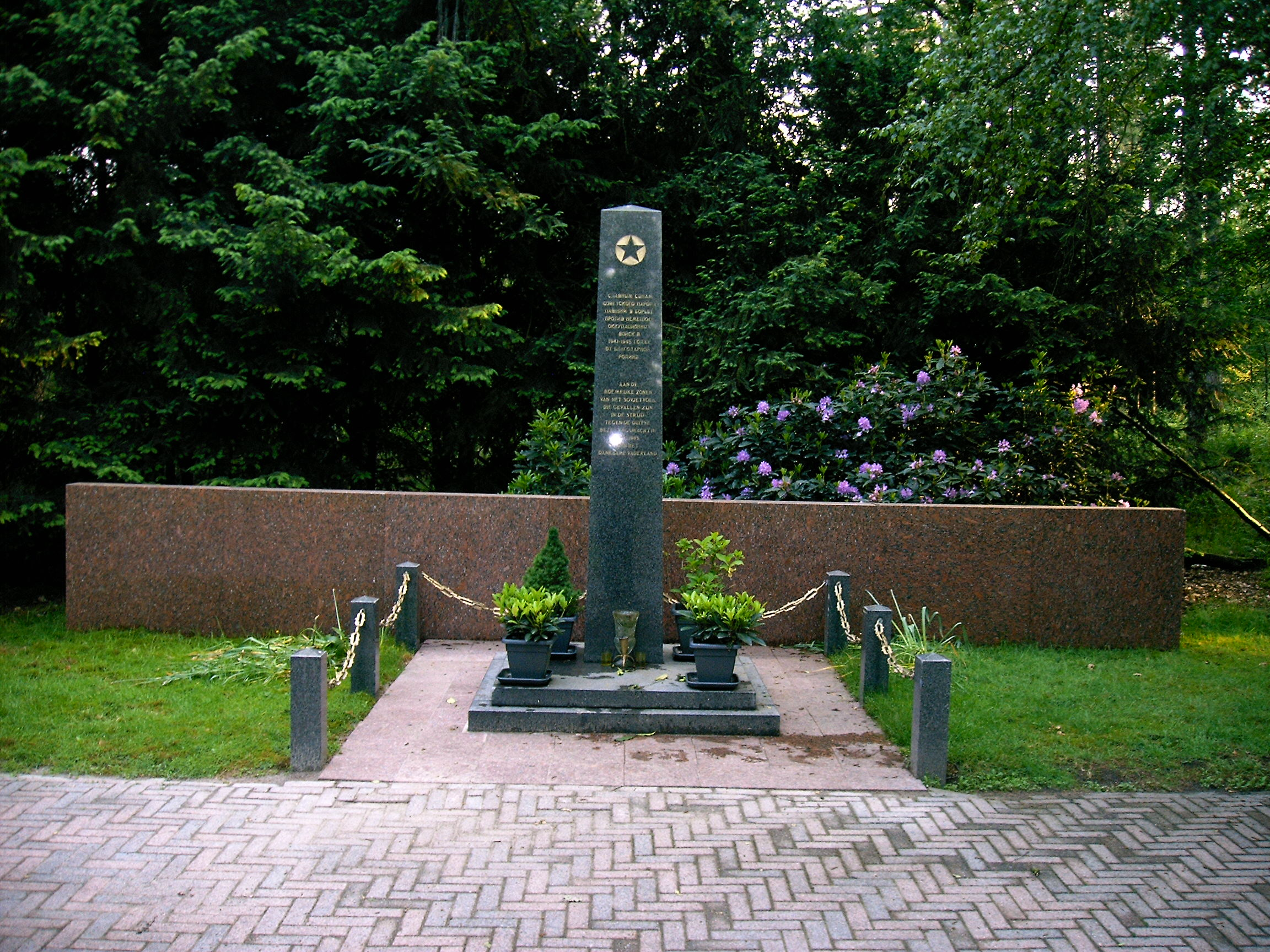
Memorial stone for Russian prisoners of war

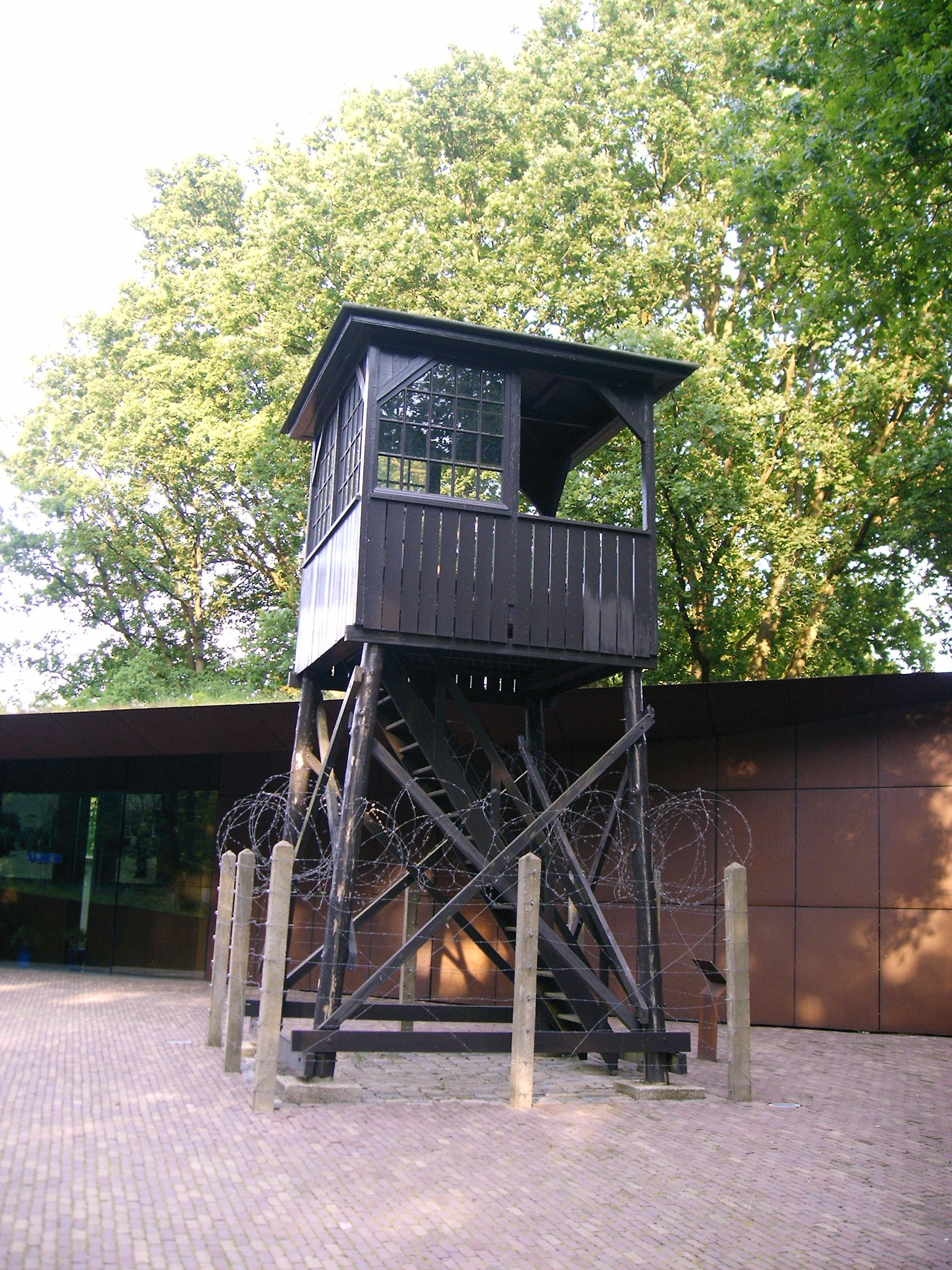
Original watchtower

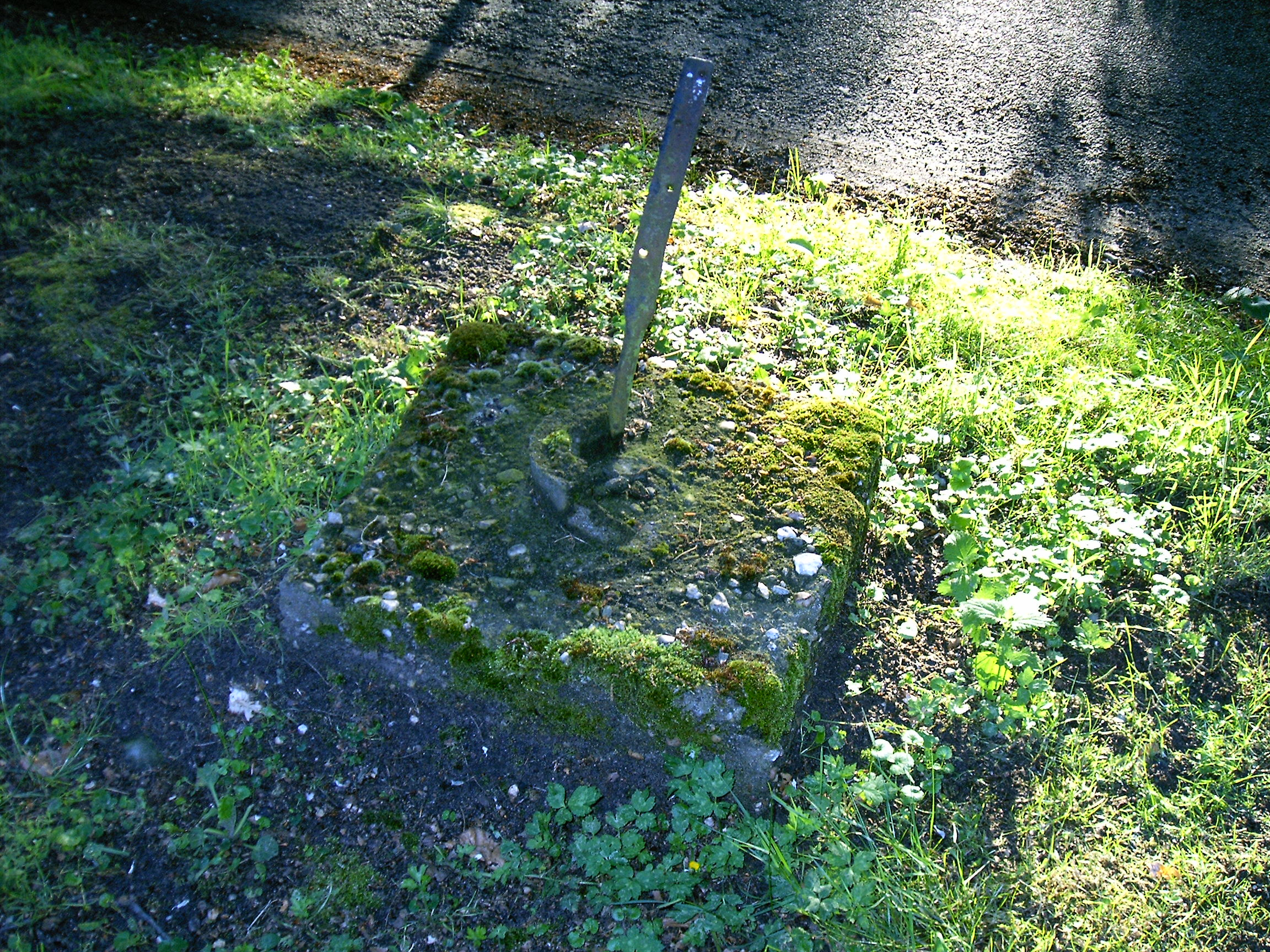
Foundation of watchtower that originally stood by the gate

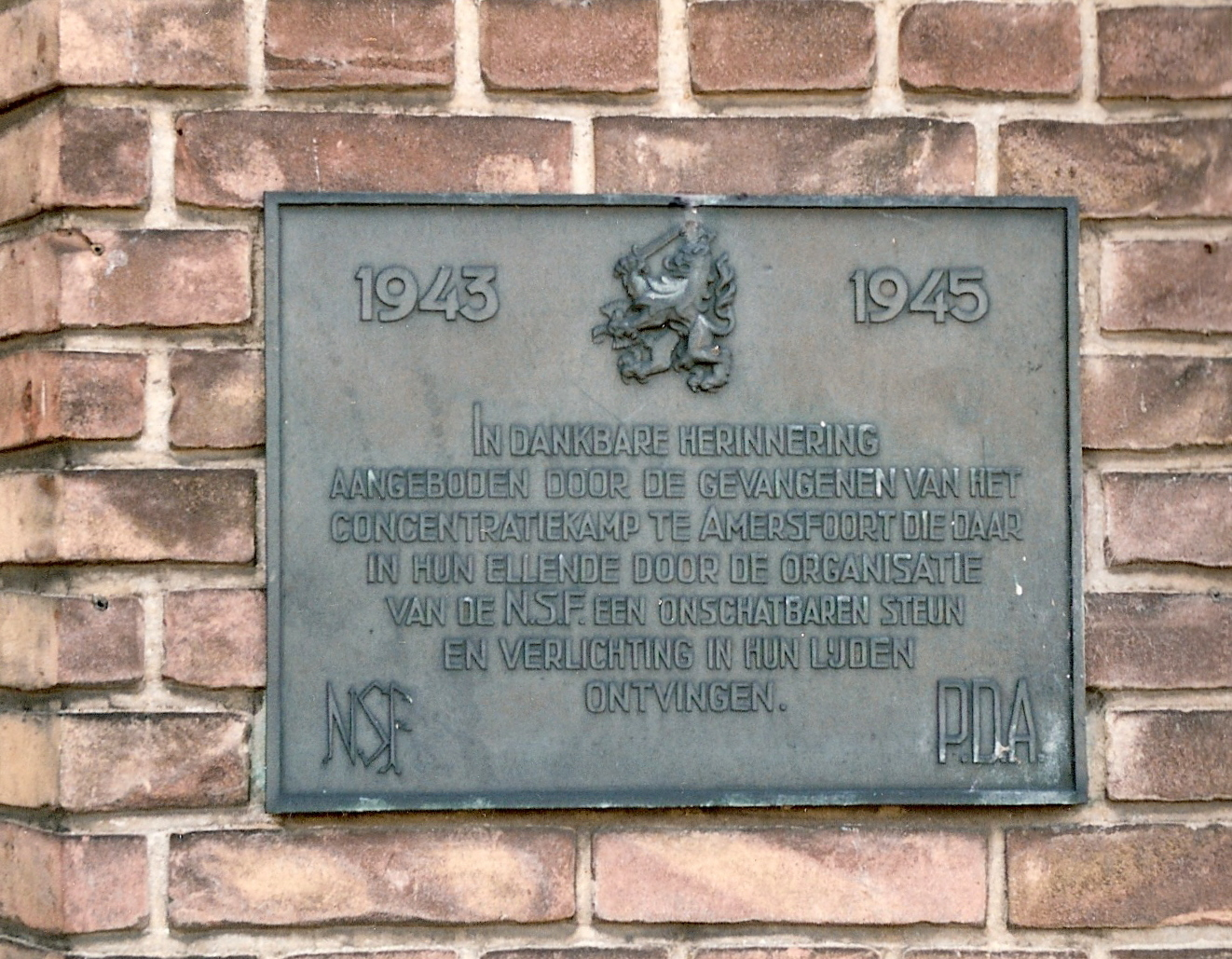
Commemorative plaque of the Dutch Signal Company
