= Mediene =

The Mediene is the name given to all the Jewish kehillot in the Netherlands outside of the capital Amsterdam, the historical center of Dutch Judaism. From the 18th century onwards up until the Holocaust, dozens of Jewish communities were created in towns large and small scattered throughout the Netherlands. At its height, some 180 kehillot existed throughout the country.

== Disappeared communities ==
At the eve of the Holocaust, some 140 Jewish communities existed throughout the Netherlands, many of them located outside of Amsterdam and the Randstad. At the end of the war, with some 75% of Dutch Jews murdered in the Nazi concentration camps, many of these communities disappeared.

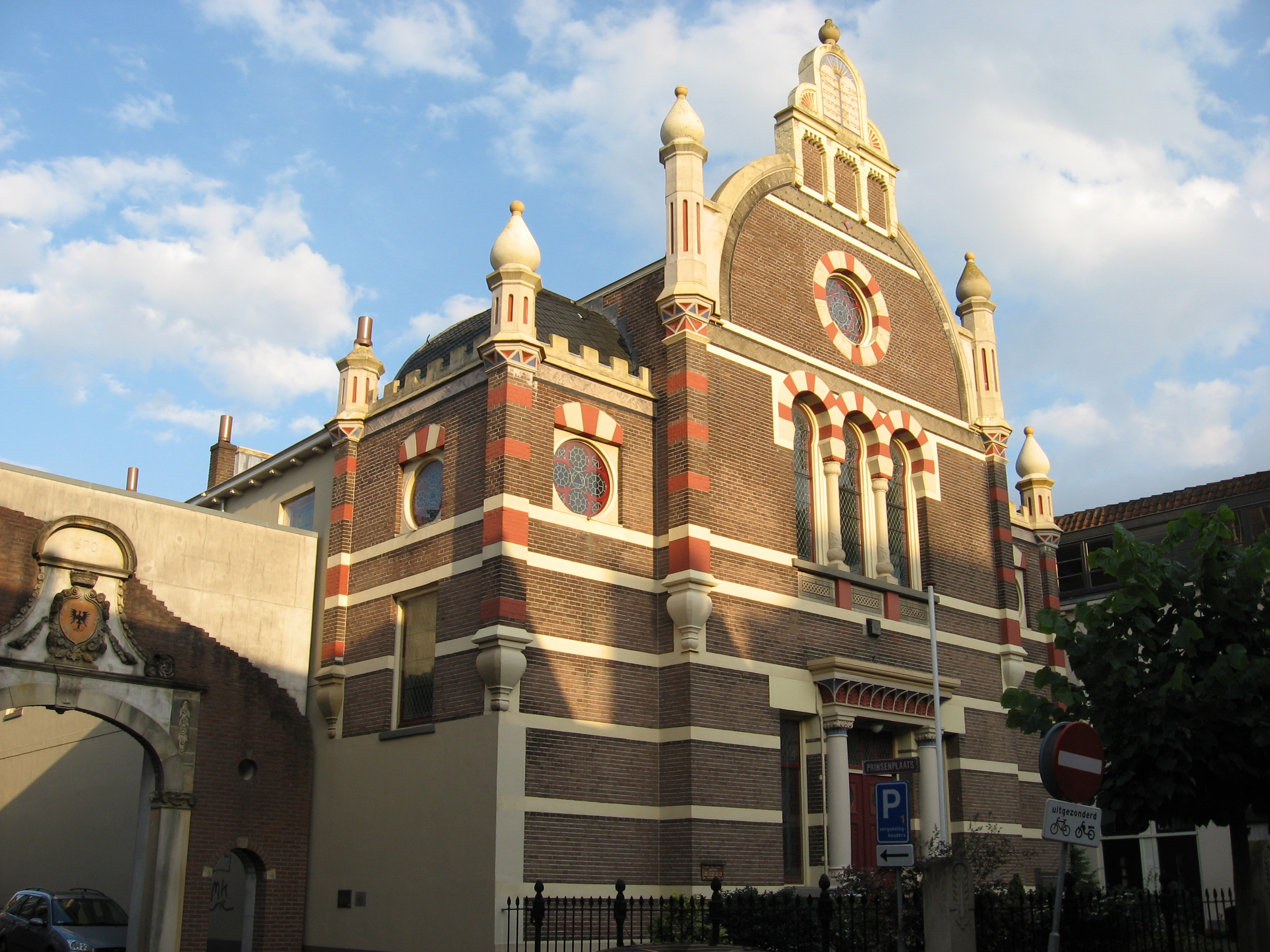
The Great Synagogue of Deventer. Numbering 442 persons in 1930, this Jewish community in the mediene was largely destroyed during the Holocaust. It eventually merged with two other Jewish communities, those of Apeldoorn and Zutphen, in 2000.

Some prominent Jewish communities in the Mediene who were totally destroyed by the Nazis include:

- Apeldoorn (1,030 Jewish inhabitants in 1930, community merged with the Jewish communities of Deventer and Zutphen in 2000)
- Winschoten (493 Jewish inhabitants in 1940, community abolished in 1964)
- Zandvoort (372 Jewish inhabitants in 1930, community merged with the Jewish community of Haarlem in 1947)
- Dordrecht (322 Jewish inhabitants in 1930, community merged with the Jewish community of Rotterdam in 1987)
- Meppel (304 Jewish inhabitants in 1930, community merged with the Jewish community of Zwolle in 1964)
- Veendam and Wildervank (283 Jewish inhabitants in 1930, community merged with the Jewish community of Stadskanaal in 1948)
- Gouda (223 Jewish inhabitants in 1930, community merged with the Jewish community of Rotterdam in 1964)
- Hoogezand-Sappemeer (222 Jewish inhabitants in 1930, community abolished in 1948)
- Rijssen (207 Jewish inhabitants in 1930, community abolished in 1948)
- Stadskanaal (142 Jewish inhabitants in 1930, community merged with the Jewish community of Groningen in 1988)
- Pekela (140 Jewish inhabitants in 1930, community merged with the Jewish community of Stadskanaal in 1948)
- Borculo (139 Jewish inhabitants in 1930, community merged with the Jewish community of Winterswijk in 1980)
- Beverwijk (135 Jewish inhabitants in 1930, community merged with the Jewish community of Haarlem in 1947)
- Delfzijl (134 Jewish inhabitants in 1930, community abolished in 1947)
- Lochem (125 Jewish inhabitants in 1930, community abolished in 1947)
- Sittard (125 Jewish inhabitants in 1930, community abolished in 1947)
- Heerlen (120 Jewish inhabitants in 1930, community merged with the Jewish communities of Maastricht and Roermond in 1986)
- Dieren (114 Jewish inhabitants in 1930, community abolished in 1950)
- Groenlo (105 Jewish inhabitants in 1930, community abolished in 1950)

Other Jewish communities in the Mediene greatly declined because of the Holocaust (note: Jewish inhabitants are counted on affiliation to the local Jewish community/communities):

- The Hague (10,605 Jewish inhabitants in 1930, 284 Jewish inhabitants in 1998)
- Rotterdam (10,515 Jewish inhabitants in 1930, 246 Jewish inhabitants in 1998)
- Groningen (2,408 Jewish inhabitants in 1930, 53 Jewish inhabitants in 1998)
- Arnhem (1,389 Jewish inhabitants in 1930, 70 Jewish inhabitants in 1998)
- Leeuwarden (733 Jewish inhabitants in 1930, 45 Jewish inhabitants in 1998)
- Assen (581 Jewish inhabitants in 1930, 51 Jewish inhabitants in 1998)
- Nijmegen (450 Jewish inhabitants in 1930, 30 Jewish inhabitants in 1998)

The tremendous decline and disappearance of dozens of Jewish communities throughout the Netherlands was not only due to the large numbers of Dutch Jews killed during the Holocaust, but also due to large-scale post-Holocaust emigration to countries like Israel and the United States, and migration within the Netherlands from the Mediene to Amsterdam.

== Sources ==
- Jewish Historical Museum Amsterdam
