= Maurice Frankenhuis =

Jewish Dutch Holocaust survivor and Author

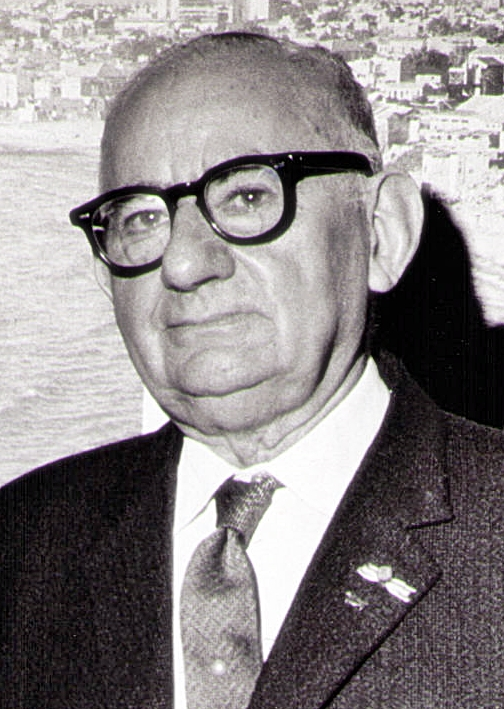
- M. Frankenhuis in 1968
- Born: Maurits; February 24, 1894; Burgsteinfurt, Germany
- Died: September 22, 1969 (aged 75); New York City, New York
- Other names: Moritz
- Occupations: Businessman, Author, Collector
- Known for: The Frankenhuis Collection; The Holocaust; World War I; World War II; Numismatics
- Spouse: Hertha Frankenhuis
- Children: Julia, Bertie
- Website: www.frankenhuiscollection.com

Maurice Frankenhuis (February 24, 1894 – September 22, 1969) was a Jewish Dutch businessman, historian, researcher, author, collector, numismatist, Holocaust survivor, and philanthropist. He documented the history of World War I and World War II through his family's experiences in the Netherlands and subsequent internment in two concentration camps. Throughout the ordeal he built a collection of memorabilia and authored a firsthand account to the Holocaust of Dutch Jewry. He dedicated himself to educating about the Holocaust, and preserve a record of history for future generations including donations of his collections of medals and posters to various museums around the world, and writing his personal memoirs, observations and commentary on world affairs after the war.

== Family and background ==
Maurits Frankenhuis was born in Burgsteinfurt, Germany on February 24, 1894 as a Dutch citizen. His parents and grandparents were of Dutch citizenship, which made him a Dutch citizen by law. In 1900, the family moved to Enschede, the Netherlands. In 1912, he spent six months in Manchester, England, to learn English and the family's cotton business. He returned to England in 1915, but was soon sent home to the Netherlands with other aliens expelled during the war. In 1925, he married Hertha de Vries. Maurits Frankenhuis was one of several prominent textile manufacturers that supported the Jewish community of Enschede. In 1929, he moved away from Enschede, to the Hague, behind the Dutch water line. On May 14, 1940, four days after the Nazi invasion of the Netherlands, the family desperately tried to flee the country but were not successful. On July 23, 1942, the Jewish date of Tisha B’Av, the family went into hiding in Amsterdam. They were betrayed and arrested on March 28, 1944, imprisoned in Scheveningen and sent to Westerbork punishment camp on April 20, 1944. In early September they were transported by cattle-car train to Theresienstadt ghetto camp and interned until June 6, 1945. He immigrated to the United States in 1948 and his name changed from Maurits to Maurice when granted United States citizenship. He resided in New York, and died on Yom Kippur, September 22, 1969. Maurice and his wife Hertha had two daughters, Julia and Bertie.

== Early life collecting interests and exhibits ==
From his early years, Maurice Frankenhuis was an avid collector of memorabilia, coins, medals, posters, documents and autographs. As partner in the cotton business K. Frankenhuis & Son in the Netherlands, his frequent travel to European countries gave him the opportunity to add historically important memorabilia to his collection.

Exhibits of his medals and posters collections were displayed over the years 1918 – 1940 in the Netherlands, England, France, Austria, drawing interest of visitors and dignitaries, including Ambassadors of England and the U.S.A. Among his exhibitions were:

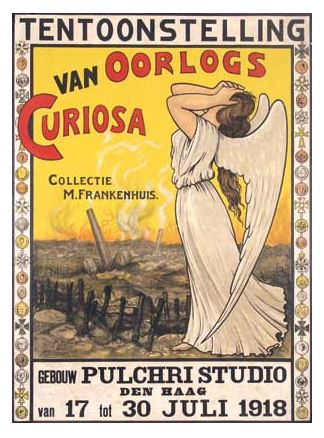
A poster advertising one of Maurice Frankenhuis's exhibitions after WWI

- Amsterdam, Netherlands in "Odeon", April 24 – May 7, 1918.
- The Hague, Netherlands in "Pulchri Studio", July 17 – 30, 1918.
- Manchester, England, in Houldsworth Hall, November 9–20, 1920, Proceeds in aid of St. Dunstan's (Blind soldiers & sailors).
- Paris, France, in Chateau de Vincennes in 1924, presented with the Order of the “Officier de l’Instruction Publique de France" by then President Raymond Poincare.
- Vienna, Austria in Government Building in 1925, awarded the Order of "Offizierkreuz des Ordens fuer Verdienste urn die Republik Oesterreich,” by Dr. Iquaz Seipel, president of the Republic of Austria.
- Enschede, Netherlands, June 16–24, 1928.
- "Asiel", Enschede, April 20–30, 1929 and in other cities of the Netherlands - Medal awarded to Mr. M. Frankenhuis from the Netherlands Institution for the Protection of Animals. Queen Mother Emma of the Netherlands presented a silver medal to Maurice Frankenhuis in 1928, in recognition of his exhibits for the public interest.
- Enschede, "Zevenmijls", June 1930.
- The Hague, Netherlands, in the "Ridderzaal", Knights Hall, March 1930.

At the Hague in 1933, he received special recognition for his collection of photographs, prints, medals, coins, letters, manuscripts and other materials pertaining to the founder of the House of Orange, William the Silent, and his descendants who ruled The Netherlands, including Princess Juliana (later Queen Juliana), born April 30, 1909.

== Collecting during World War I ==
During the years 1914 through 1918 of the first World War, as a citizen of the neutral Netherlands, Mr. Frankenhuis was able to procure many medals from the belligerent countries, Germany and the Allies. In 1919 he published his Catalogue of Medals, Medalets and Plaques Relative to the World War 1914 -1919 in three languages (English, Dutch, and French) detailing his World War I medal collection, acclaimed as the largest in existence. To this day it is a valuable reference work for numismatists and historians. After the war he was anxious to return to England, but foreign nationals were still barred from visiting. Through the efforts of Ambassador Sir Walter Townley, a visitor to Maurice Frankenhuis’ exhibitions, the British government gave special consideration to the request and granted his return in exchange for a donation of his World War I medals to the British Museum, deemed of national value: A letter from George Francis Hill, keeper of the department of coins and medals at the British Museum presented Maurice Frankenhuis with an opportunity: “in the ordinary circumstances the Secretary of State would not be prepared to allow you to return at the present time for business reasons, but if your offer of war medals is considered by the trustees of the British Museum to be of value to the nation, he will not place obstacles in the way of your return.”

== Rise of Nazism and World War II ==
Maurice Frankenhuis closely followed the events in Europe and the rise of Adolf Hitler and the Nazi Party during the 1930s. Having been neutral during World War I, Dutch Jewry reasoned that their country would not be targeted when World War II broke out in September 1939 with an attack on Poland. Regrettably, upon the Nazi invasion of the Netherlands on May 10, 1940, Maurice Frankenhuis and his family found themselves trapped. Efforts to emigrate to the U.S.A or England were in vain. Shortly after the invasion, the family business was “officially” confiscated by the Germans. While the Occupation authorities appropriated financial assets and personal items of value to the war effort, Maurice already began arrangements for safekeeping some of his remaining personal valuables including his collection. When summoned to a labor camp, he defiantly took his family into hiding with a Dutch family in the Hague on July 23, 1942. They remained there for 21 months, until being betrayed by an informer and imprisoned in Scheveningen. The family was transferred to the Westerbork transit camp in the Netherlands April 20, 1944, and then deported to Theresienstadt in Czechoslovakia September 6, 1944. Throughout the entire ordeal, he wrote a secret diary using his own creative methodology that he claimed “Nobody, not even the F.B.I., Scotland Yard, or any espionage institution would be able to know what has been written down.” After the war, it took Maurice Frankenhuis two years to decode his diary from the secret code into Dutch. After the liberation of Theresienstadt concentration camp by the Soviet army, he returned with his family to the Netherlands on June 27, 1945. They were one of the very few Jewish family units to have survived. Of the population of 140,000 Dutch Jews prior to the war, 80% of Dutch-Jewish citizens were murdered in the German concentration camps, the highest percentage of any country in Western Europe. The family immigrated to New York and officially became citizens of the US in 1948.

== Documentation and interviews ==
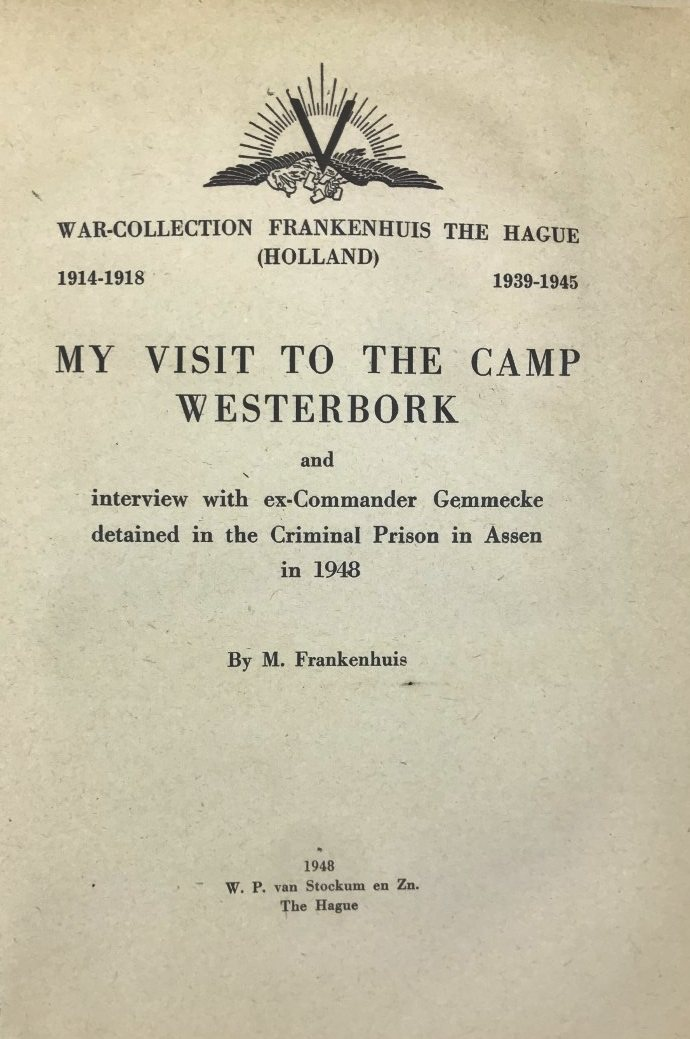
Frankenhuis' Interview with Westerbork's ex-Commander Albert Konrad Gemmeker

Maurice Frankenhuis continued to monitor war-related events in the post-war period, making frequent trips to Europe, gathering and documenting information, and attending war-crime trials. He shared his reports with institutions worldwide including the Wiener Library, and YIVO Institute for Jewish Research. In 1948 he returned to the Westerbork concentration camp to interview Commandant Albert Konrad Gemmeker and his mistress. Published in Dutch and English, this was the only interview to have been conducted prior to sentencing while being detained.

A half hour docudrama film based on the self-published story of Maurice Frankenhuis’ interview with the Westerbork Commander Gemmeker premiered at the Westerbork Camp Remembrance Center on September 13, 2019, exactly 75 years after the last transport from the camp. The release date for the film is May 4, 2020, the official Remembrance Day in the Netherlands.

In 1961 he provided information to the prosecution of the Eichmann trial. In January 1965 at the Plaza Hotel in New York, Maurice Frankenhuis interviewed Prince Louis Ferdinand. Frankenhuis knew his father, the second son of the Crown Prince of Germany and had elaborate correspondence with the grandfather, Kaiser Wilhelm II. Maurice Frankenhuis would correspond with state and religious leaders, dignitaries, authors, and celebrities in Europe and America, adding his personal commentary and supporting factual data in response to events and remarks published in world news.

Pages from M. Frankenhuis' diary on Theresienstadt are included in H.G. Adler's authoritative work on the concentration camp. Adler writes: "This immensely detailed diary by the author, who came to Theresienstadt from Westerbork on September 6, 1944, provides abundant insight into daily life in the camp during its period of deterioration."

He contributed World War II era photographs from his collection for historian writer Nora Levin's book, one of the first of its genre published in 1968, The Holocaust: The Destruction of European Jewry, 1933–1945.

== Donations to museums ==
Between 1939 and 1940 Maurice Frankenhuis served as correspondent-representative of the Oranje Nassau Museum in The Hague and donated medals, prints, autographs, letters, and manuscripts, which are housed at the Museum.

Portions of the collections of posters, coins and medals from the First and the Second World War were secured during the war under an assumed name at a bonded warehouse. Maurice Frankenhuis donated much of his collection to museums, as “living evidence” to maximize the memorial value of these artifacts of his epoch.

In the aftermath of World War I, he donated nearly 600 medals to the British Museum. With the creation of the State of Israel in 1948, Maurice Frankenhuis endowed approximately 2000 medals of World War I and II to the Kadman Numismatic Pavilion in Museum Haaretz in Tel Aviv, Israel in 1961 which three years later was curated in a special exhibition, "The Five Years of the Nazi Occupation in Europe".

In 1965, Frankenhuis documented and donated Lodz Ghetto (Litzmannstadt) Coinage to the Jewish Museum in New York. The Litzmannstadt ghetto money in 5-, 10- and 20-mark denominations, was first described and researched by Maurice Frankenhuis, and subsequently donated to the Jewish Museum in New York in 1965. Donations of numismatic and other material were given to other museums including the American-Israel Cultural Foundation in New York.

After Maurice Frankenhuis’ death, his two grandsons, Joseph and Aaron Oppenheim donated 5000 World War I posters to the Columbia University Rare Books and Manuscript Library in New York in 1974. "As a result of the recent donation of the Frankenhuis Poster Collection, Columbia now possesses one of the most important privately held collections of posters and proclamations of the First World War and its immediate aftermath."

== Tribute to the Six Million Martyrs Medal ==
In 1967, Maurice Frankenhuis commissioned a “Tribute to the Six Million Martyrs” medallion sculpted by renowned American artist Elizabeth N. Weistrop and struck by Medallic Art Co. The medal depicts a Jewish mother grasping her two daughters, the Star of David sewn on their garments. In the background, others are loaded onto a cattle-car transport under Nazi guard to an unknown fate. On the reverse, survival is symbolized by a tree stump with new branches growing forth, and the inscription: “THE FRANKENHUIS COLLECTION 1914 – 1918, 1939 – 1945 DESPITE THE FORCES OF DESTRUCTION MAURICE FRANKENHUIS PAINSTAKINGLY RECORDED THE HISTORY OF TWO WORLD WARS IN HIS COLLECTION”. He presented his medal to institutions, world leaders, individuals and Righteous Gentiles.

== Numismatic activities ==
In 1967, Frankenhuis was one of the founders of A.I.N.A, the American Israel Numismatic Association. He displayed exhibitions of his World War II medals at New York coin shows in 1967 - 1968. The Frankenhuis byline appeared over a series of Coin World articles tracing the history of World War II through tokens and medals. Other features about Karl Goetz and many assorted Adolf Hitler medals issues served as primary sources for such works as Colbert and Hyder's Medallic Portraits of Adolf Hitler.

== World War I centennial exhibits ==
Exhibits of several of his major collections pertaining to World War I were curated during the centennial years 2014 -2018.

- The British Museum prepared a special centennial exhibit in 2014 displaying a number of the Frankenhuis Collection medals donated in 1918–1920 in the context of “The Other Side of the Medal: How Germany Saw the First World War”.
- The Rare Books and Manuscripts Library at Columbia University displayed an exhibition, “The European Home Front in WWI: Posters from the Frankenhuis Collection.” in 2014.
- The Kadman Numismatic Pavilion of Museum Haaretz in Tel Aviv, Israel in 2017 opened a permanent exhibit with select items from his vast contribution to the museum in 1961. It was described by the curator as “an important and rare collection of medals and medallions made during the war by the fighting powers, designed by the finest artists who lived and worked in Europe during World War I.”
