= Curt Berglund =

Swedish former International Ice Hockey Federation executive

- Born: 30 August 1923; Stockholm, Sweden
- Died: 3 April 2003 (aged 79); Torrevieja, Spain
- Known for: IIHF Minister of Finance
- Awards: IIHF Hall of Fame

Curt Berglund (30 August 1923 – 3 April 2003) was a Swedish former International Ice Hockey Federation (IIHF) executive. He served as the IIHF's Minister of Finance before retiring and serving as Tournament Chairman for the 1998 IIHF World Championship and 2001 IIHF World Championship Pool B tournament. Although he died before his induction, Berglund was honored posthumously into the IIHF Hall of Fame in 2003 as a builder.

== Career ==
In 1972, Berglund was elected to the Swedish Ice Hockey Association board of directors and later became a board member, chairman, and treasurer with the Stockholm hockey club AIK IF.

In 1975, Berglund joined the International Ice Hockey Federation (IIHF) as a treasurer and he worked with the organization until 1990 as their Minister of Finance. While working for the IIHF, Berglund served as the Swedish delegate while dealing with the 1987 Ice Hockey World Championships controversy regarding Sweden's gold medal win.

After retiring, he was named an IIHF Honorary Member and Tournament Chairman during the 1998 IIHF World Championship Pool B tournament in Ljubljana, Slovenia. He later served as the Tournament Chairman for the 2001 IIHF World Championship Division 1 Group B and was named one of the 2003 IIHF Hall of Fame inductees. Although he died before his induction, Berglund was honored posthumously into the IIHF Hall of Fame.
