= Curt Beilschmidt =

German composer

Curt Ludwig Hermann Beilschmidt (20 March 1886 in Magdeburg − 7 March 1962) was a German composer.

== Life ==
Beilschmidt studied at the Leipzig Conservatory from 1905 to 1909 and then went to Brussels. When he returned to Leipzig, he taught music theory and piano at the conservatory and was later active in the field of research at the University of Music and Theatre Leipzig (1946-1956).

His catalogue of works comprises 141 pieces.

Beilschmidt died in Leipzig at the age of 75.

== Compositions ==
- Madrigalmusik für Streichquartett (op. 4), first performance 17 December 1908
- Streichquartett (op. 5)
- Cellosonate (op. 10)
- Im Maien : Sinfonietta (E-Dur) für Orchester : (op. 17)
- Tanzspiel Das Abenteuer im Walde (op. 25)
- musikalische Komödie Meister Innocenz (op. 24)
- Schäferspiel Der schlaue Amor (op. 30)
- Violinkonzert (op. 57)

== Work ==
- Weihnachtspastorale : Hirten- und Marienlieder; neugefasst und für 3 Frauenstimmen mit Klavier gesetzt; Werk 131. (1950)
- Kommt ohne Instrumente nit! : Advents- und Weihnachtslieder für Sopran- und Altblockflöte. (circa 1950)
- Partiten für zwei Sopranblockflöten : op. 135c
- Operettenklänge : beliebte Melodien aus klassischen Operetten; für Klavier zu 2 Händen. (1960)
- Verdi und Wagner. (1961)
