= Curt Andersson =

Swedish sports shooter

Personal information
- Full name: Curt Ingvar Rafael Andersson
- Born: 13 June 1937 Raseborg, Finland
- Died: 4 June 2018 (aged 80)

Sport
- Sport: Sports shooting

Curt Ingvar Rafael Andersson (13 June 1937 – 4 June 2018) was a Swedish sports shooter. He competed at the 1972 Summer Olympics and the 1976 Summer Olympics.
