= Curt Wittenberg =

Curt Wittenberg is an American biologist at Scripps Research Institute and an Elected Fellow of the American Association for the Advancement of Science.
