= Westerbork film =

1944 film produced by SS in Nazi camp

The Westerbork film is a film material commissioned and shot by the SS in the transit camp for Jews in Westerbork, in the Reichskommissariat Niederlande (Nazi-occupied Netherlands) in the spring of 1944.

== Production background ==
The film was commissioned by camp commander Albert Konrad Gemmeker and was most likely shot by several camp inmates, partially under the surveillance of the SS. The surviving correspondence is sparse and does not clearly identify who was ultimately coerced into participating in the production. The film is propagandistic, downplaying the reality that thousands of German and Dutch Jews were imprisoned there under harsh conditions and constant fear. The frequent attribution of the film to the camp's photographer, Rudolf Breslauer, rests on very limited evidence. The footage includes scenes of work barracks, two arriving trains carrying Jews from Amsterdam, and one departing train bound for Auschwitz and Bergen-Belsen. Additional sequences show a soccer match, the camp's cabaret, logging activities, scenes from the camp's farm, a Christian Sunday service, and the medical clinic at Westerbork.

== Deportation transport 19 May 1944 ==
The film contains scenes that were shot during the deportation on 19 May 1944, when Jews and Sinti were deported to the labor camp Bergen-Belsen and to the extermination camp at Auschwitz. Among them was also the Sinti girl Settela Steinbach. For a long time, the girl with the headscarf seen on the platform — an iconic image of the Holocaust — was believed to be of Jewish descent. In 1997, journalist Aad Wagenaar revealed that she was of Sinti origin. Today, it is commonly believed that the girl is Settela Steinbach.

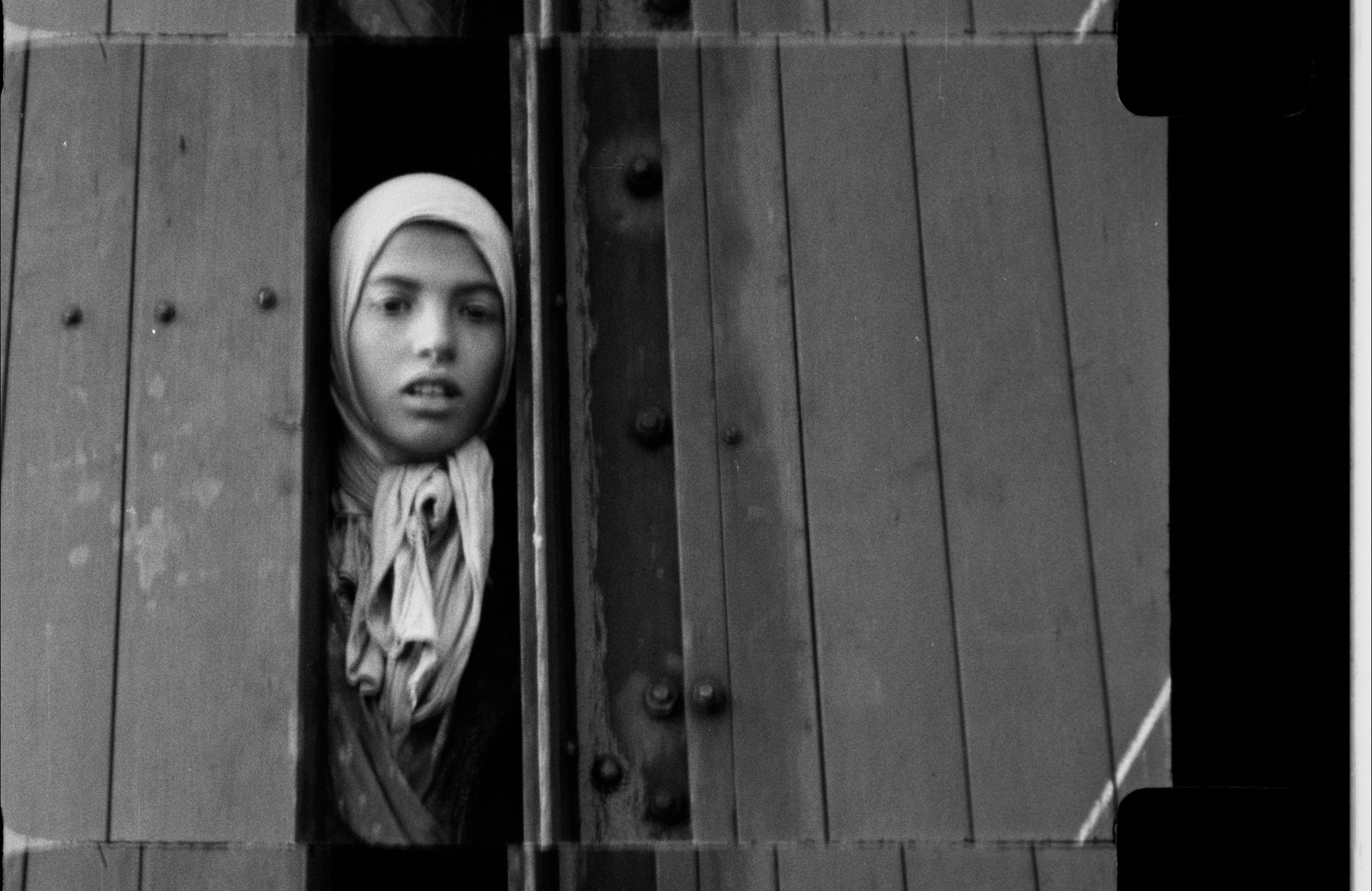
Settela Steinbach, screenshot from the Westerbork film

== Archive provenance ==
Camp commander Gemmecker most likely took the film material with him while fleeing from the Canadian troops in 12 April 1945. The film cans were found again by Hans Ottenstein in 1946/47 in the ministry of justice. It was used as evidence in the trials against Gemmecker and Highest Police Chief Hanns Albin Rauter. A re-enactment of the material appeared in 1948 in Leo Haas' feature film Lo-LPK. 1950 footage was used in the Dutch short De Vlag. 1956 Alain Resnais featured a passage with deportation trains in Nuit et Brouillard. In 1961 scenes from the Westerbork film were shown as evidence against Adolf Eichmann during his trial in Jerusalem. Since then, the material has been used in hundreds of documentaries. Until 1986, the footage was hosted by RIOD (today NIOD). It was then transferred to the archive of the Dutch RVD which later was incorporated into Beeld en Geluid. However, due to the complicated history of the material, the Eye-institute also had many cans with Westerbork footage. During a comparison of all extant materials in 2019, some previously forgotten materials were found. Today, the footage exists in the following forms: 4 reels (made from formerly 9 reels) of edited material, two reels of original negative and two reels of outtakes.

== Screenshots ==
Selection of iconic scenes:

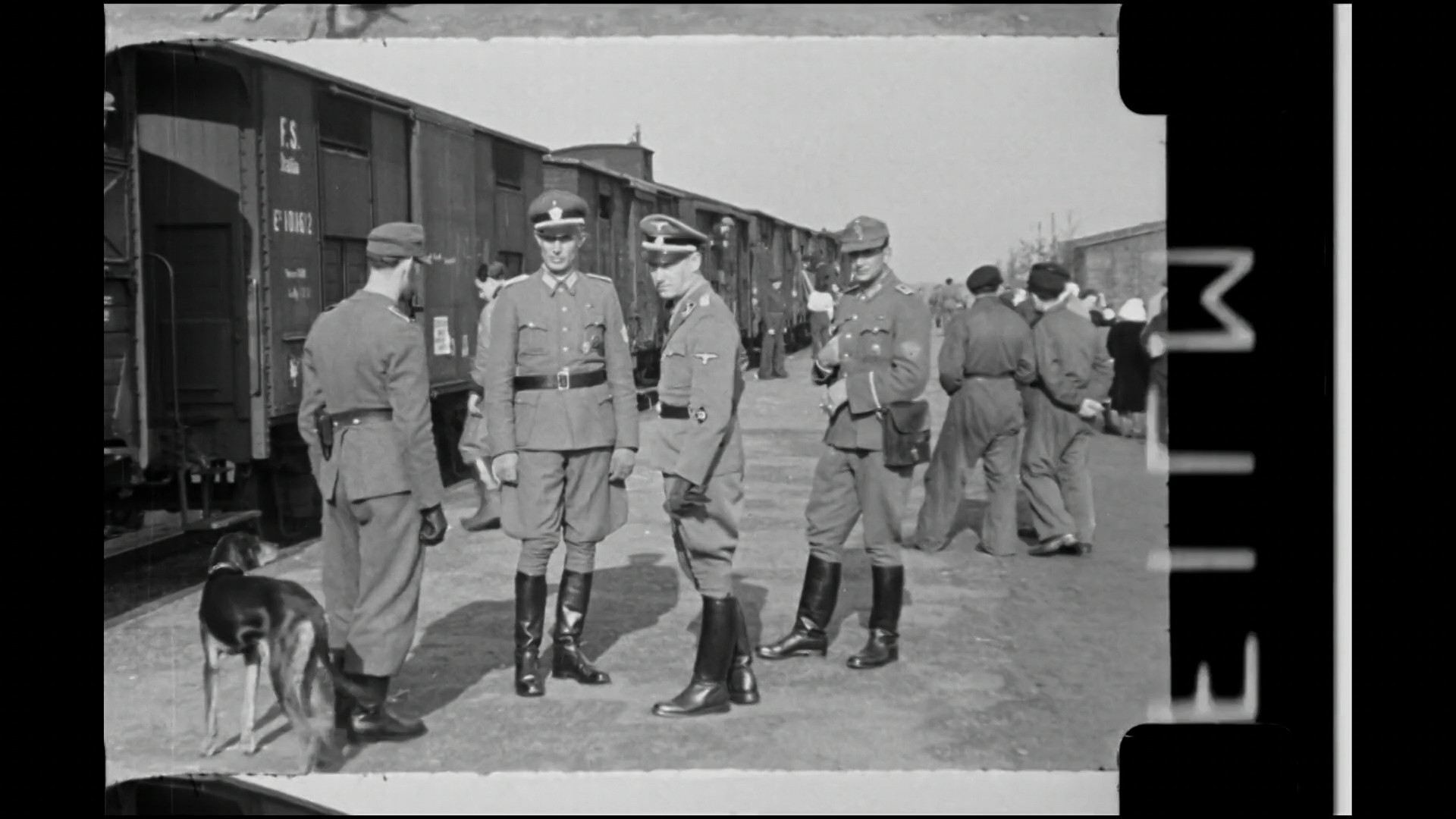

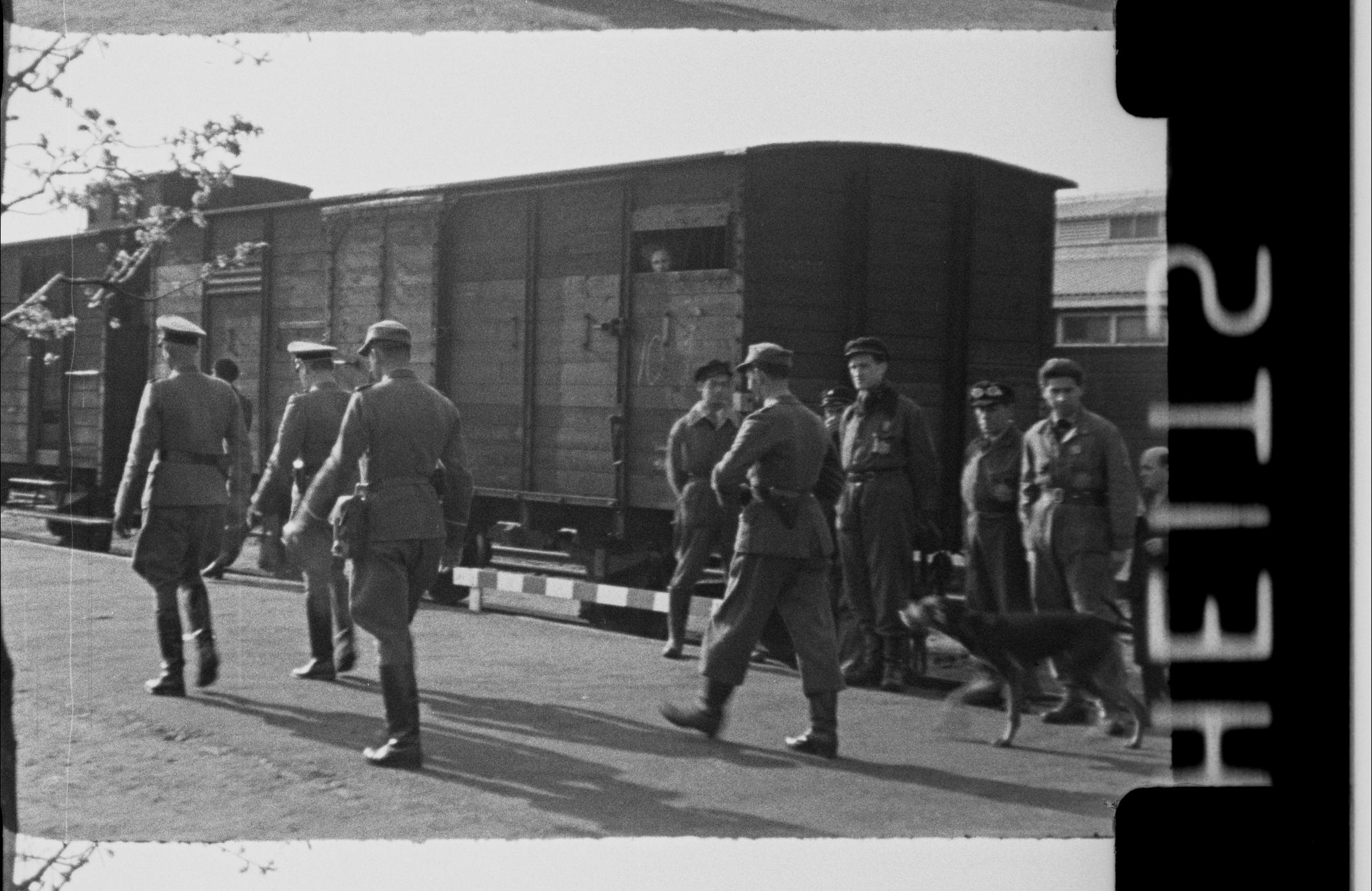

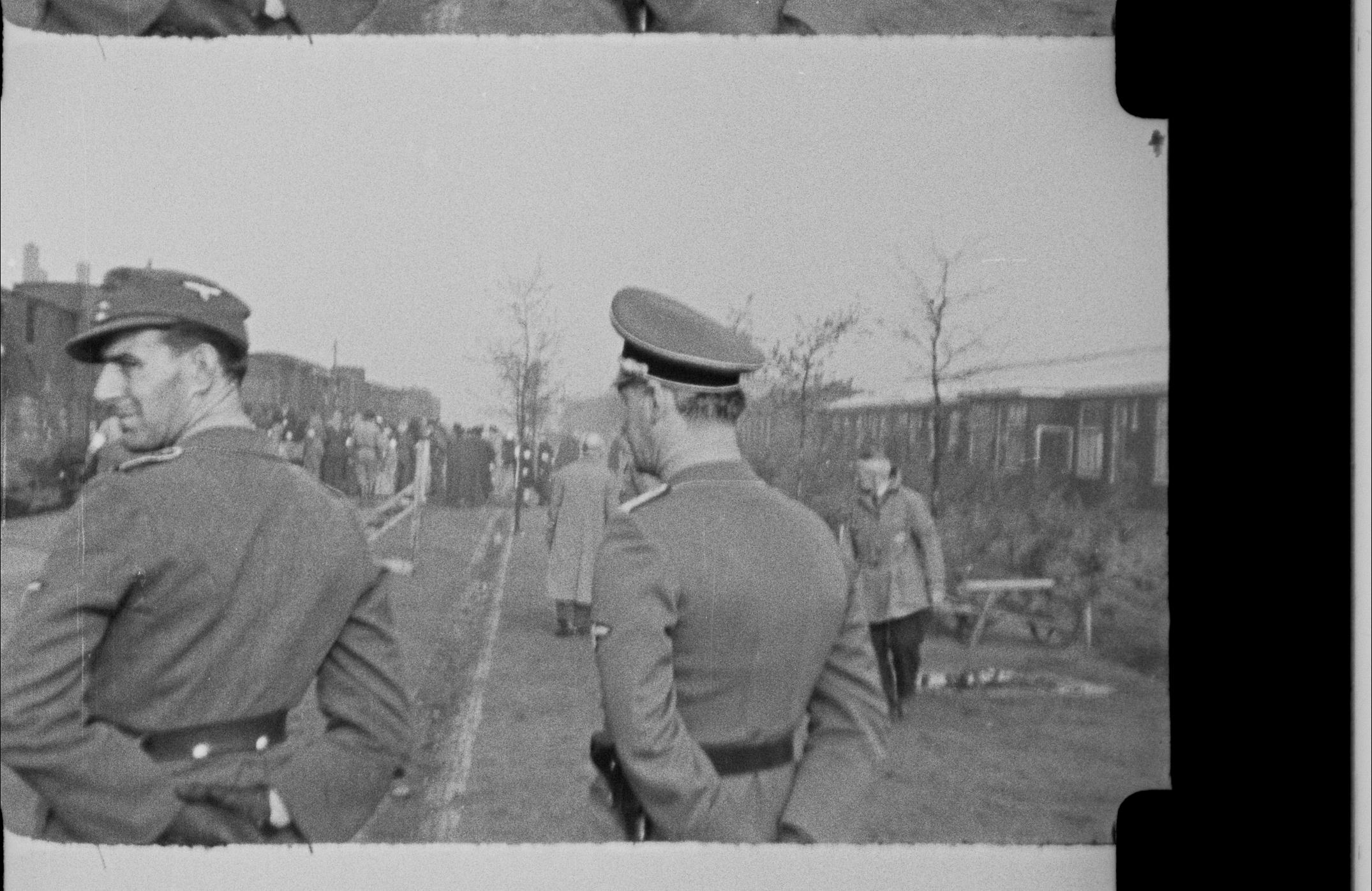

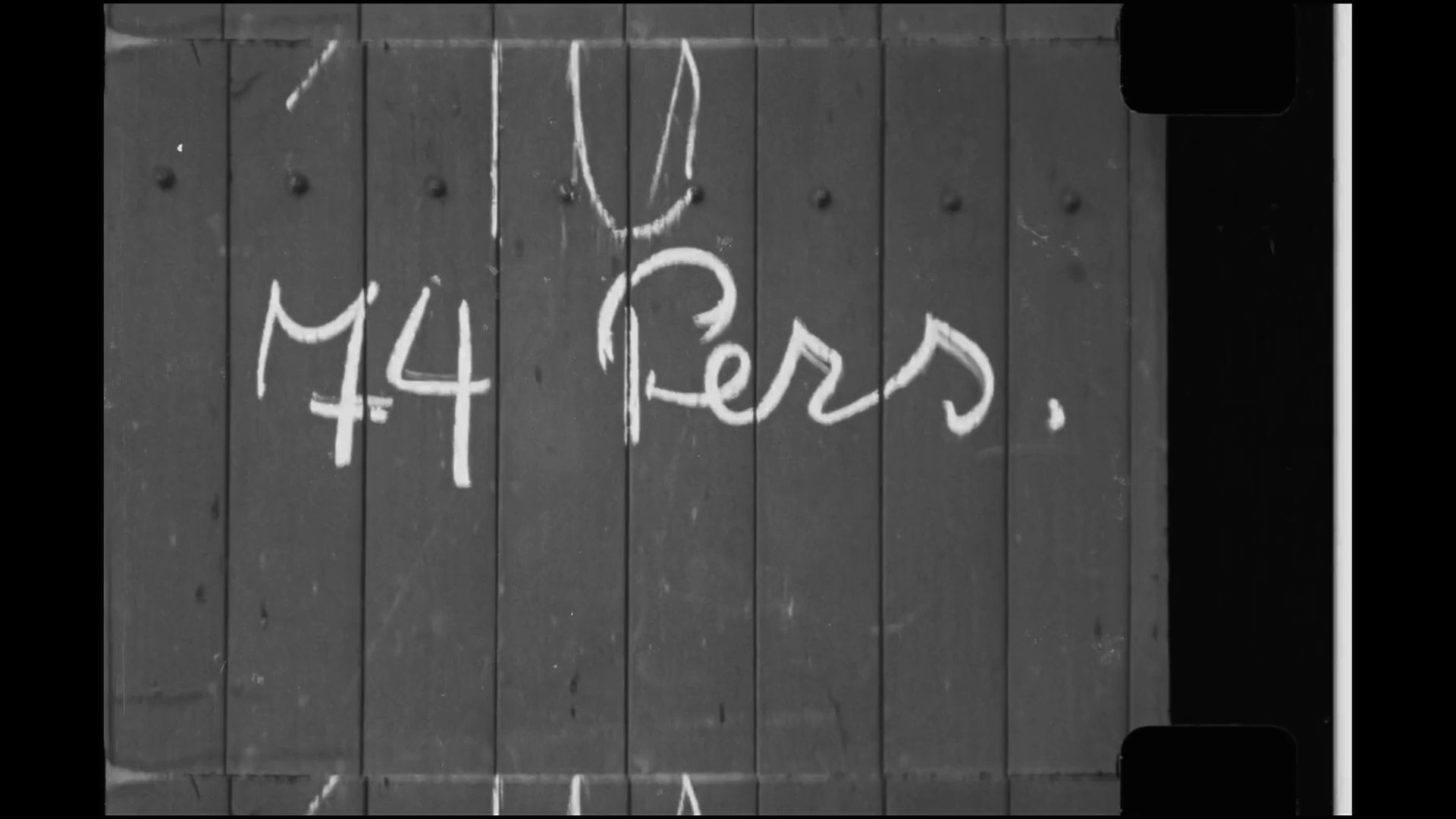

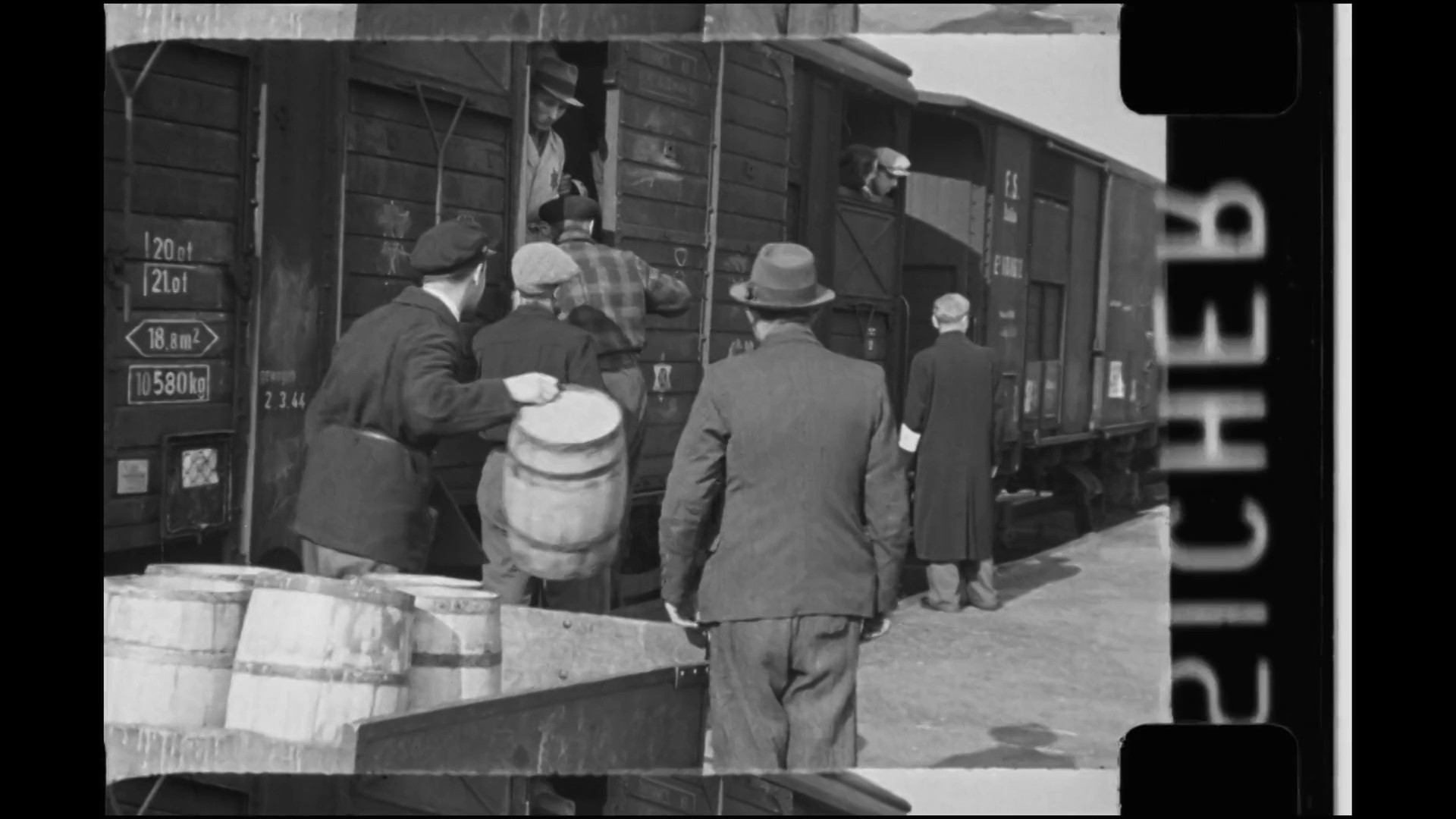

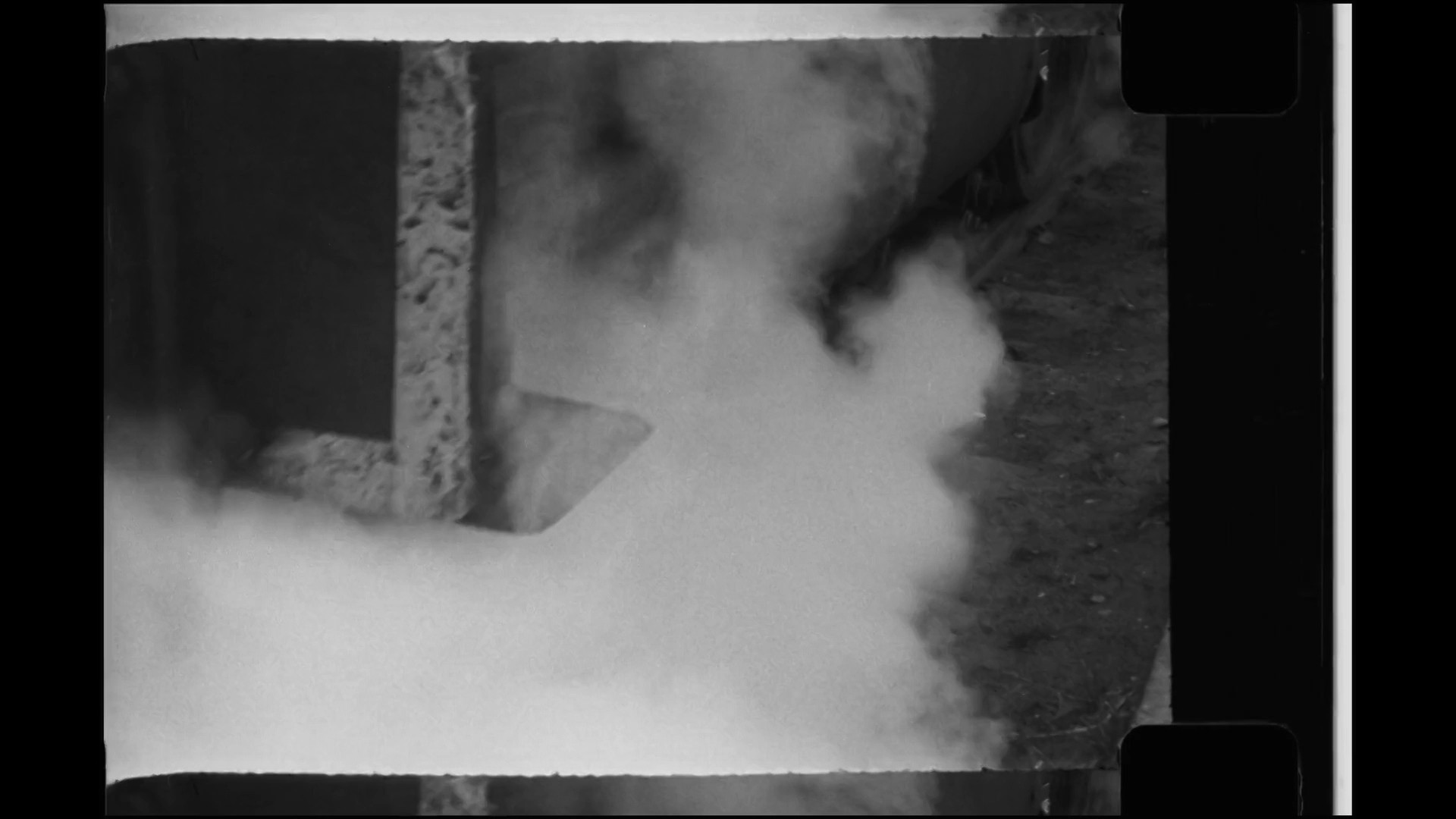

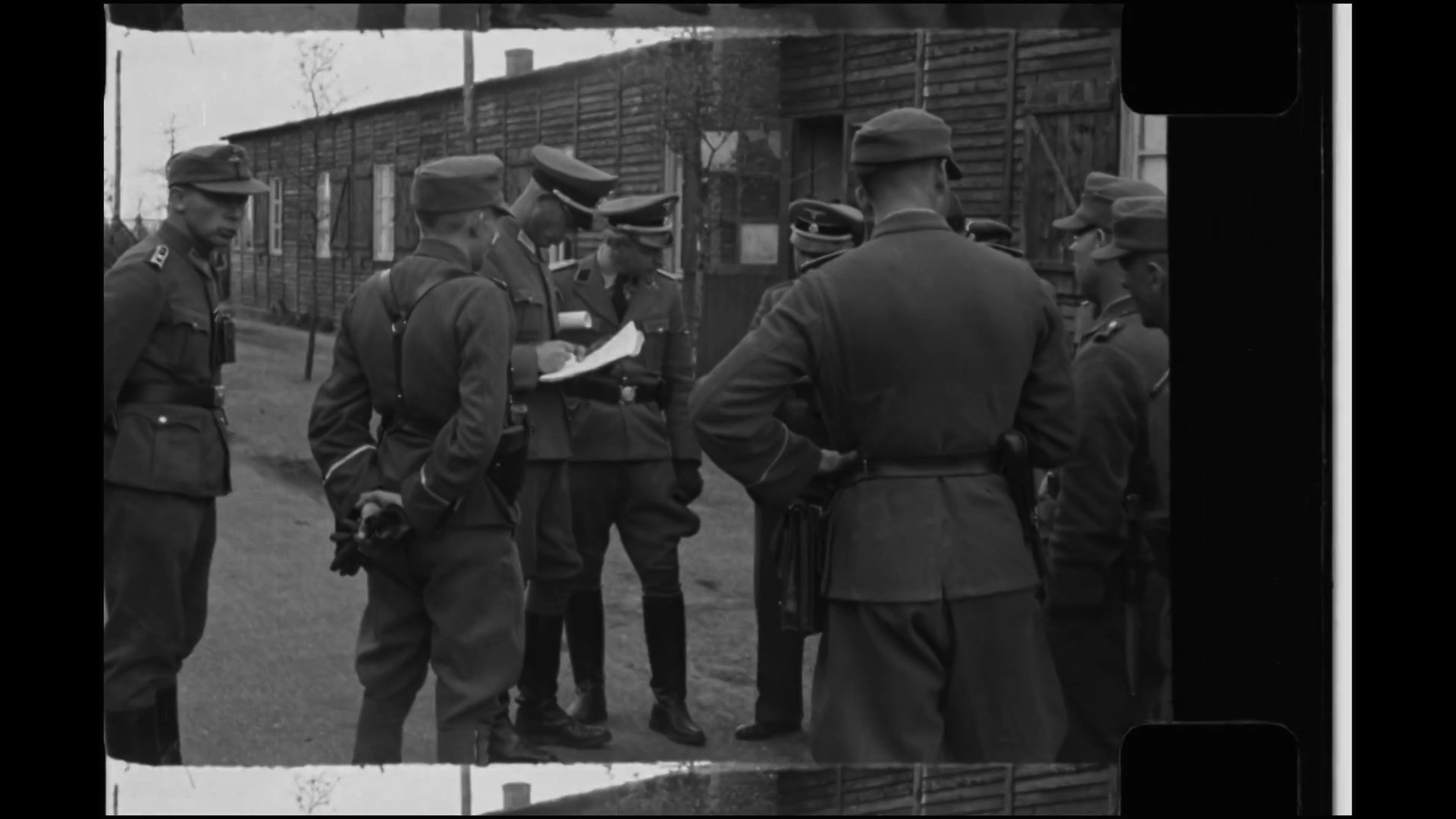

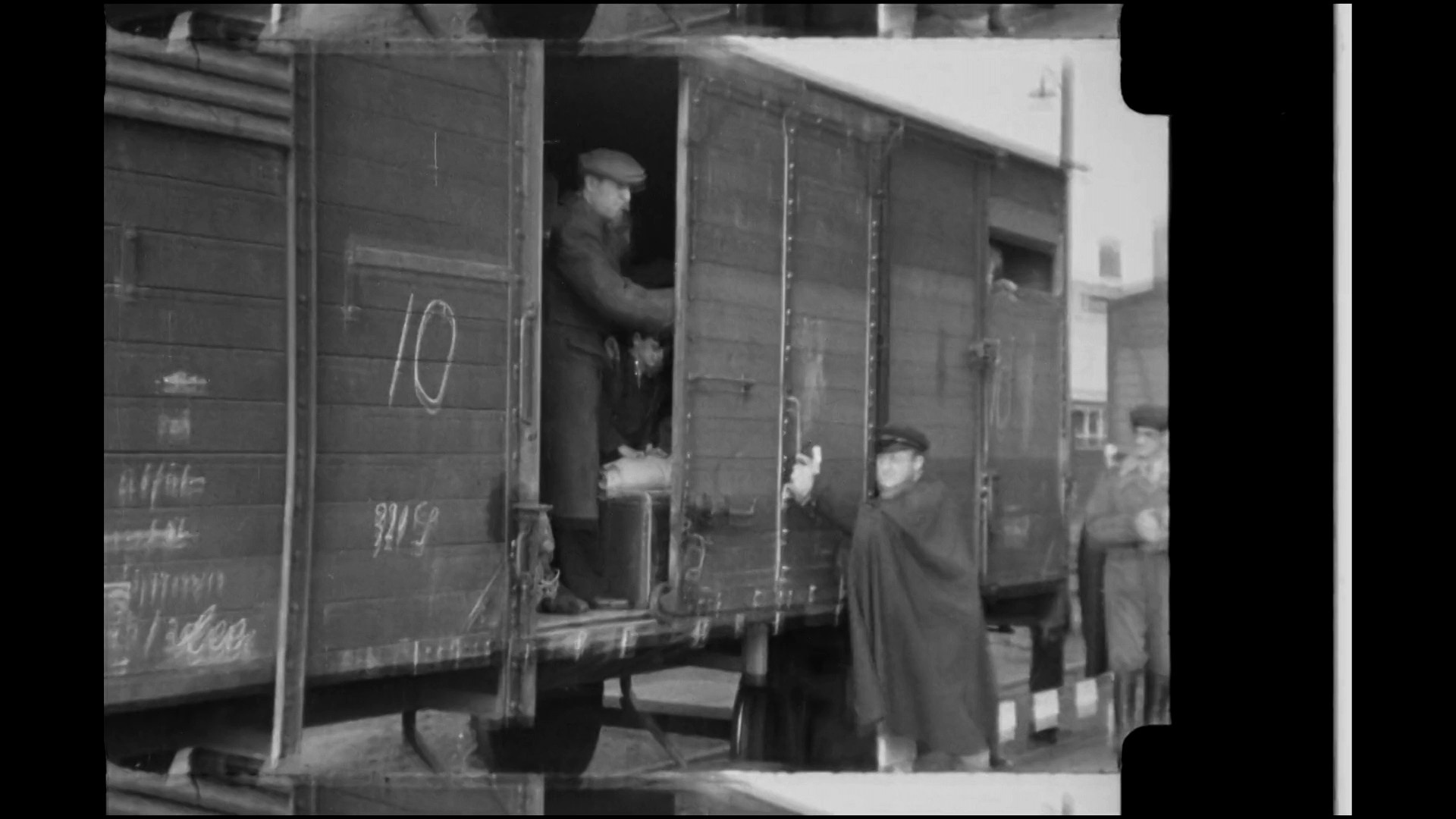

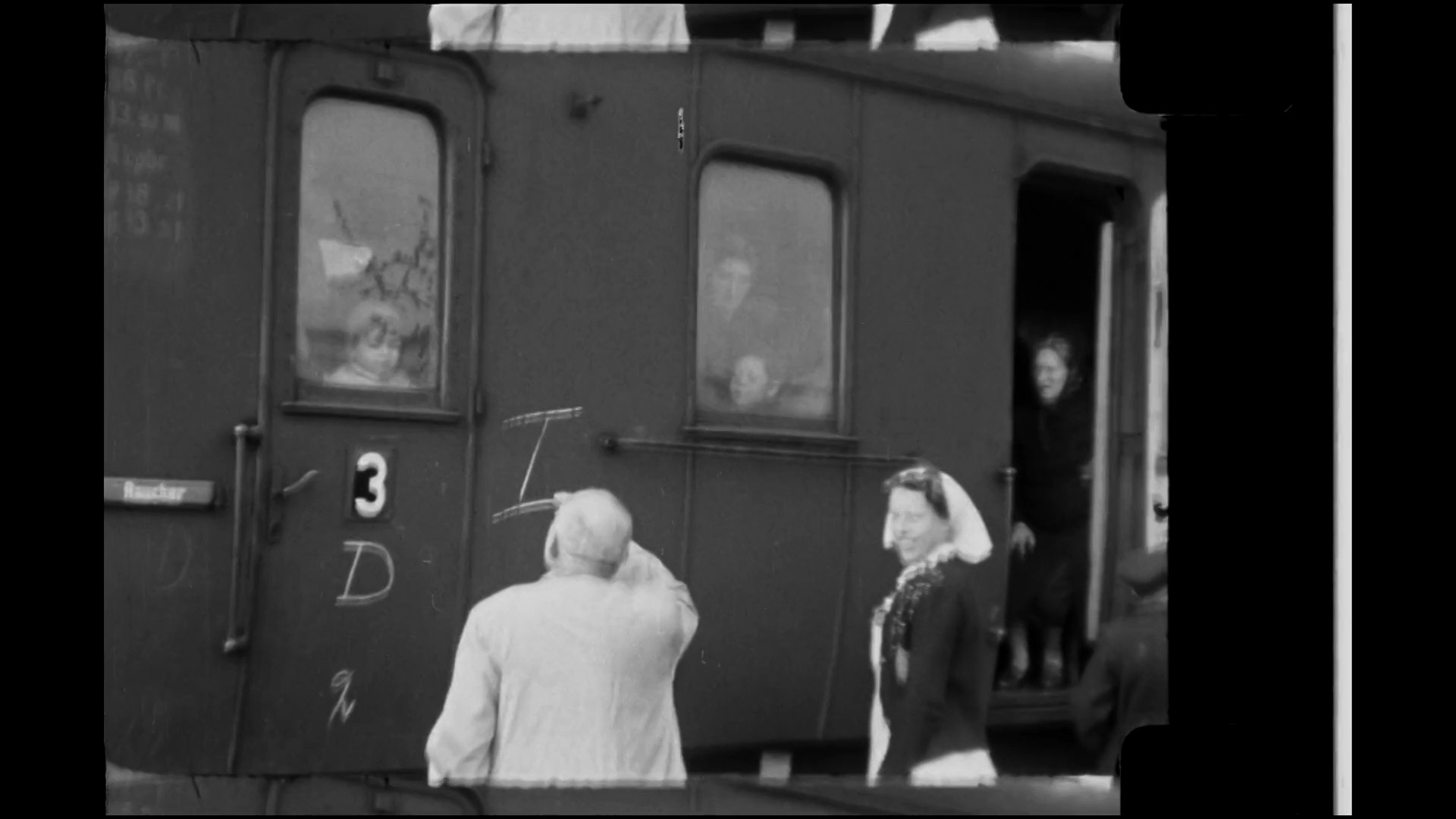

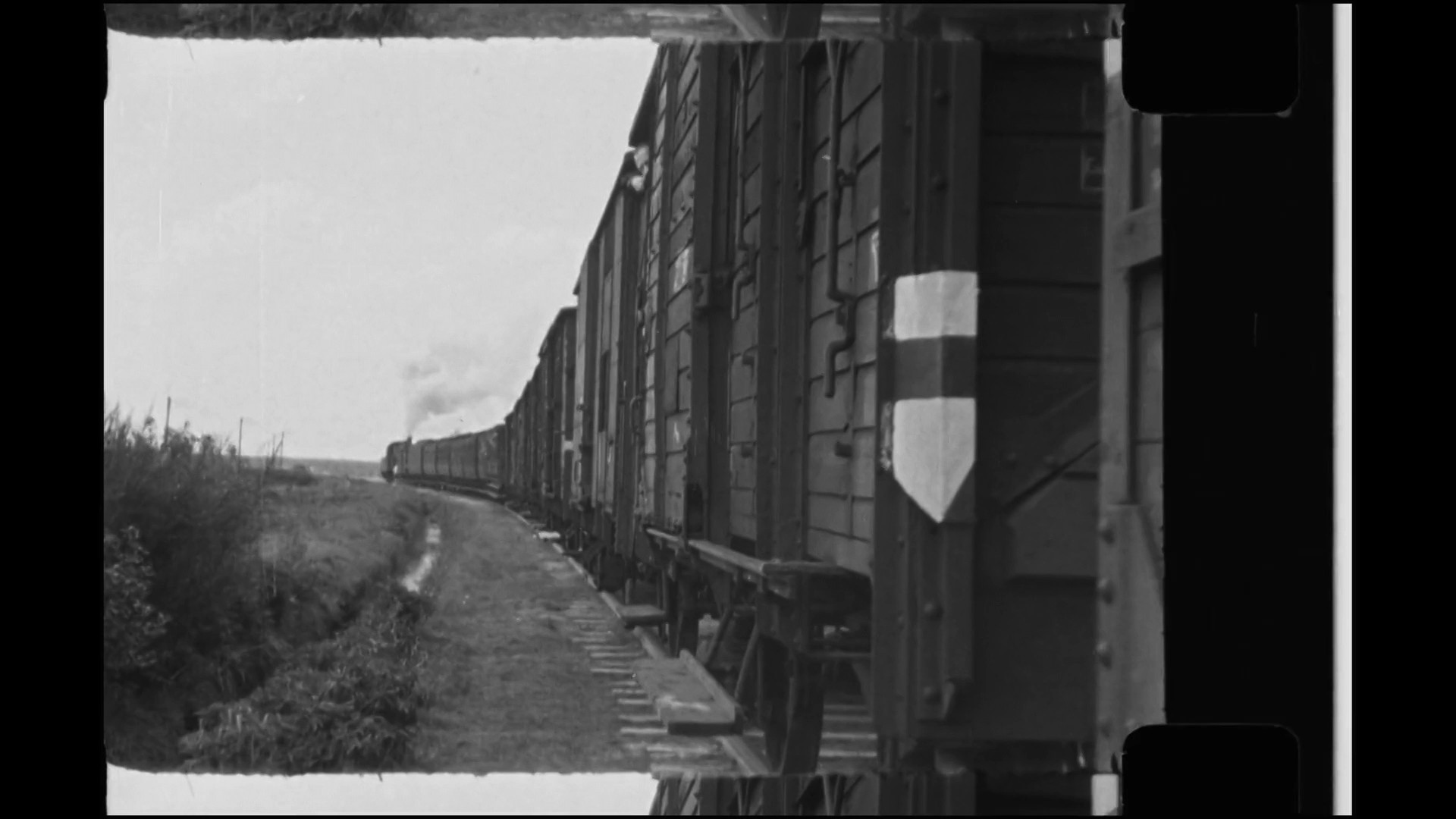

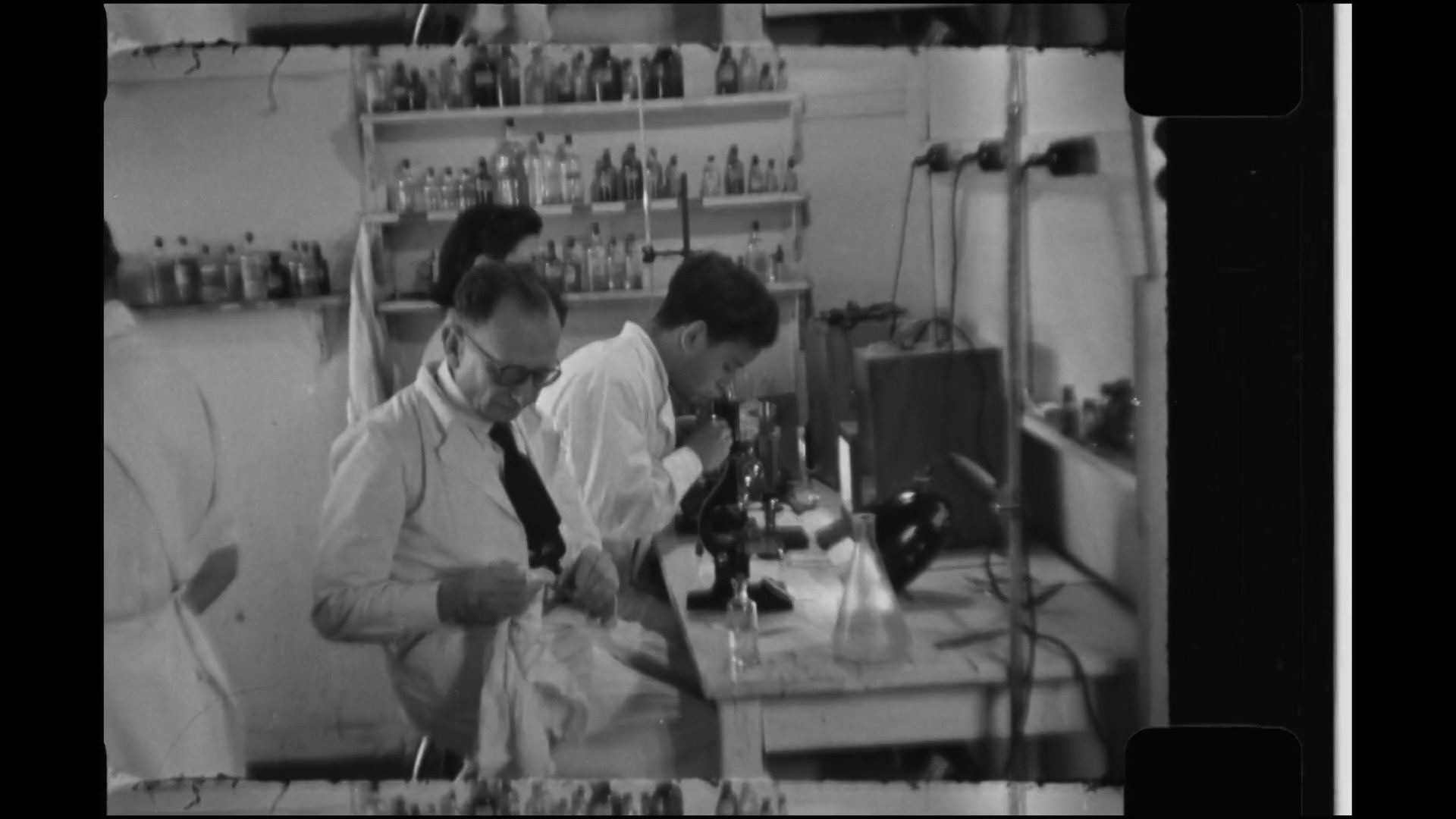

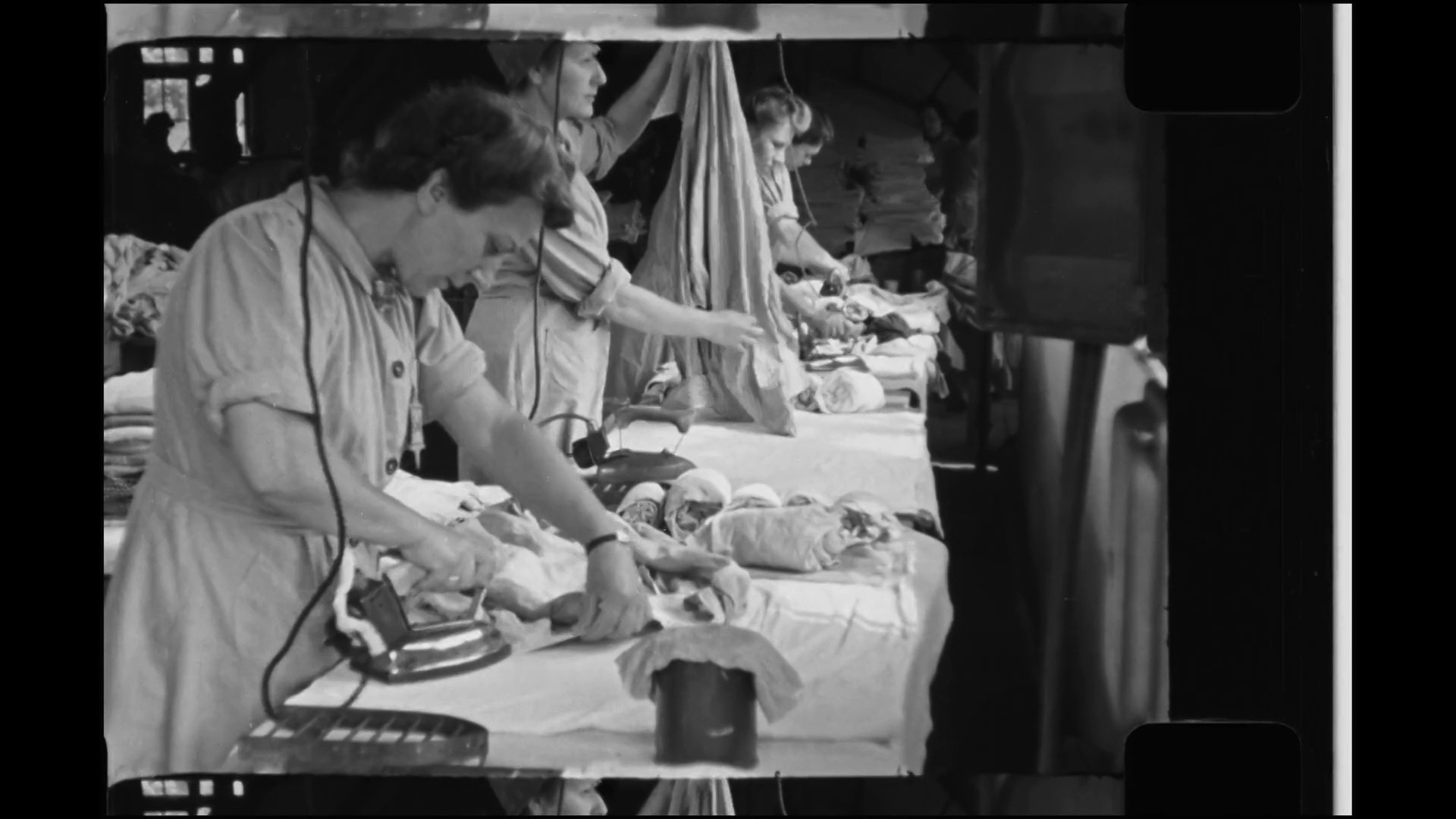

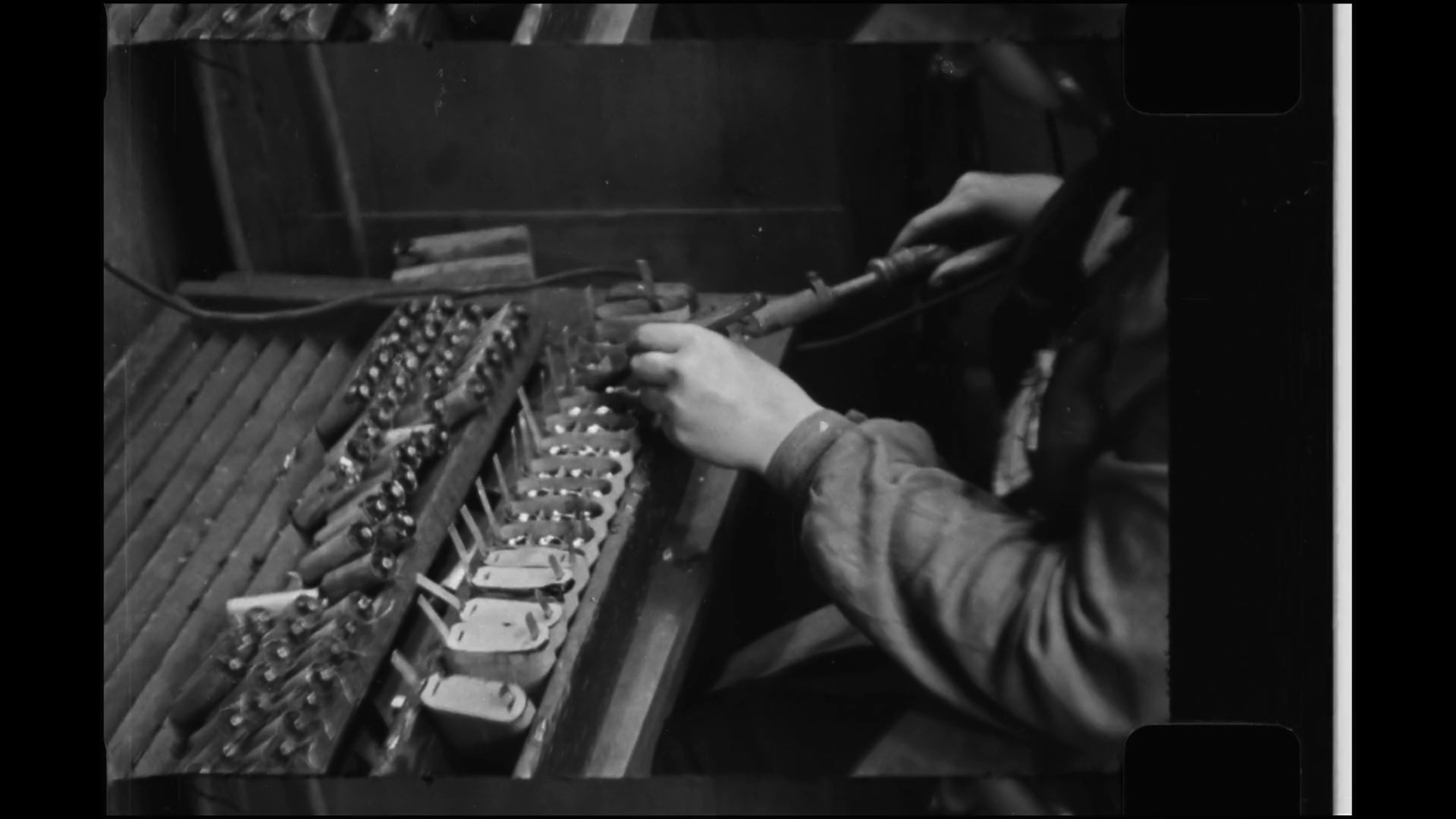

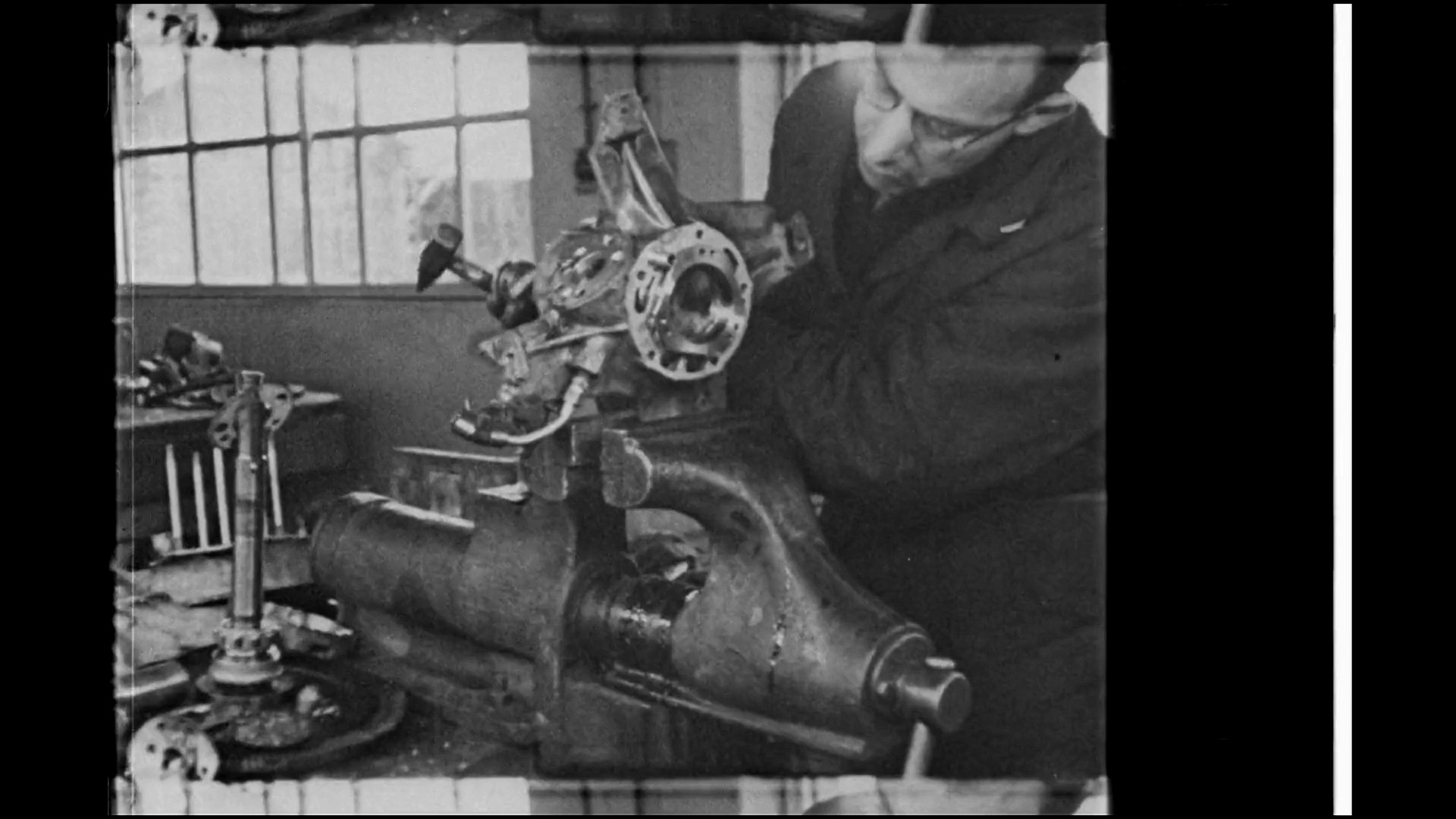

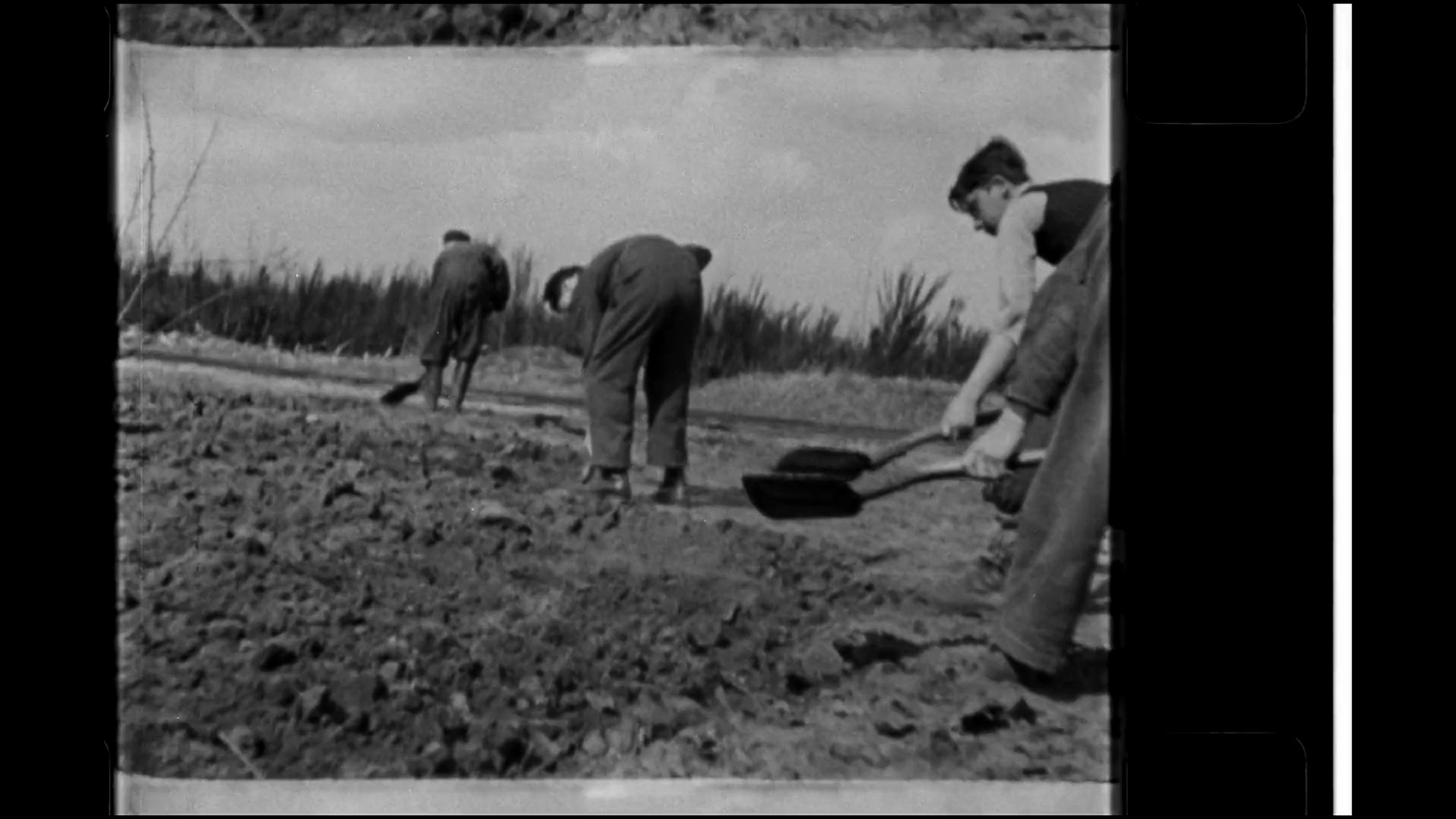

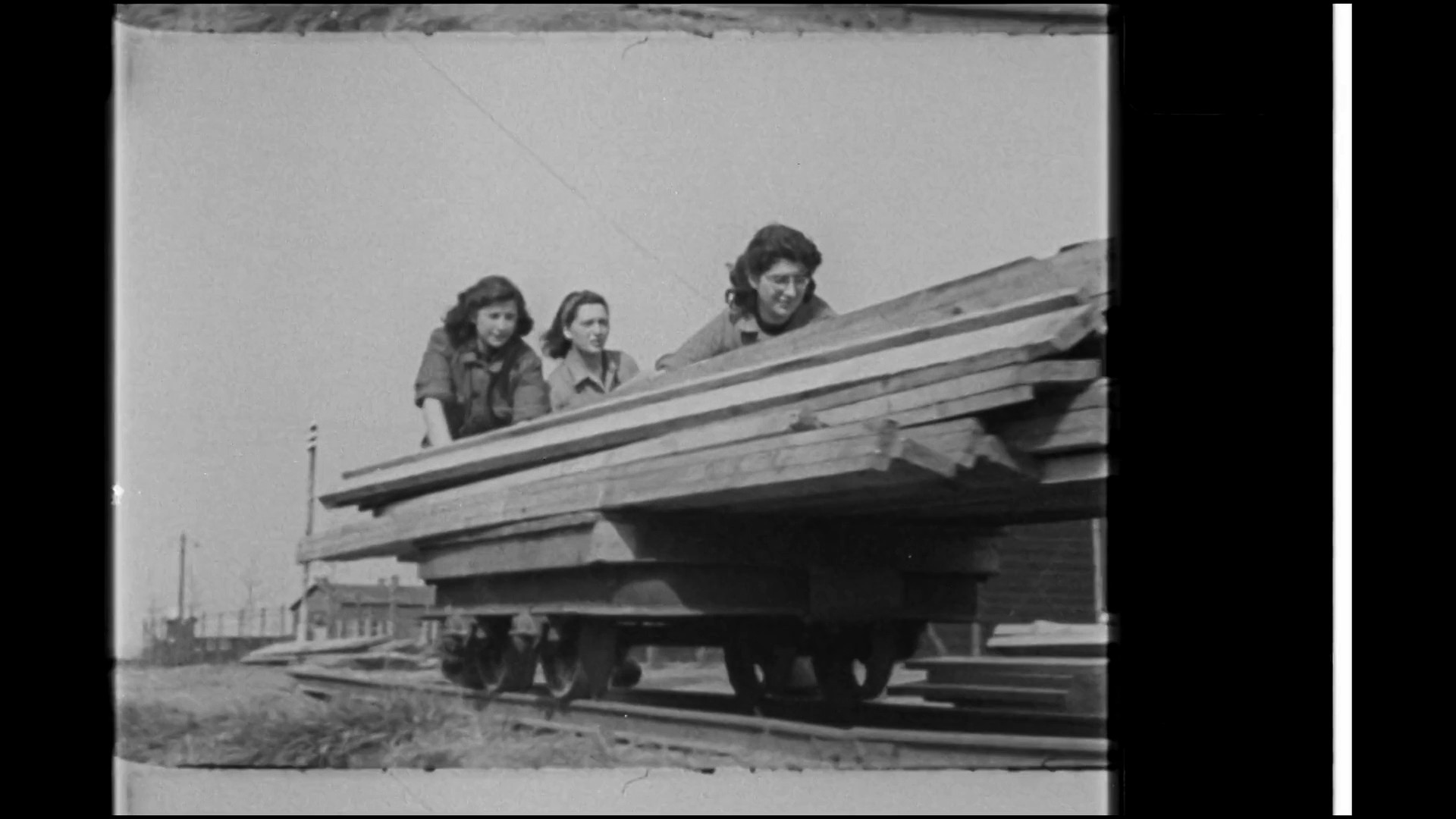

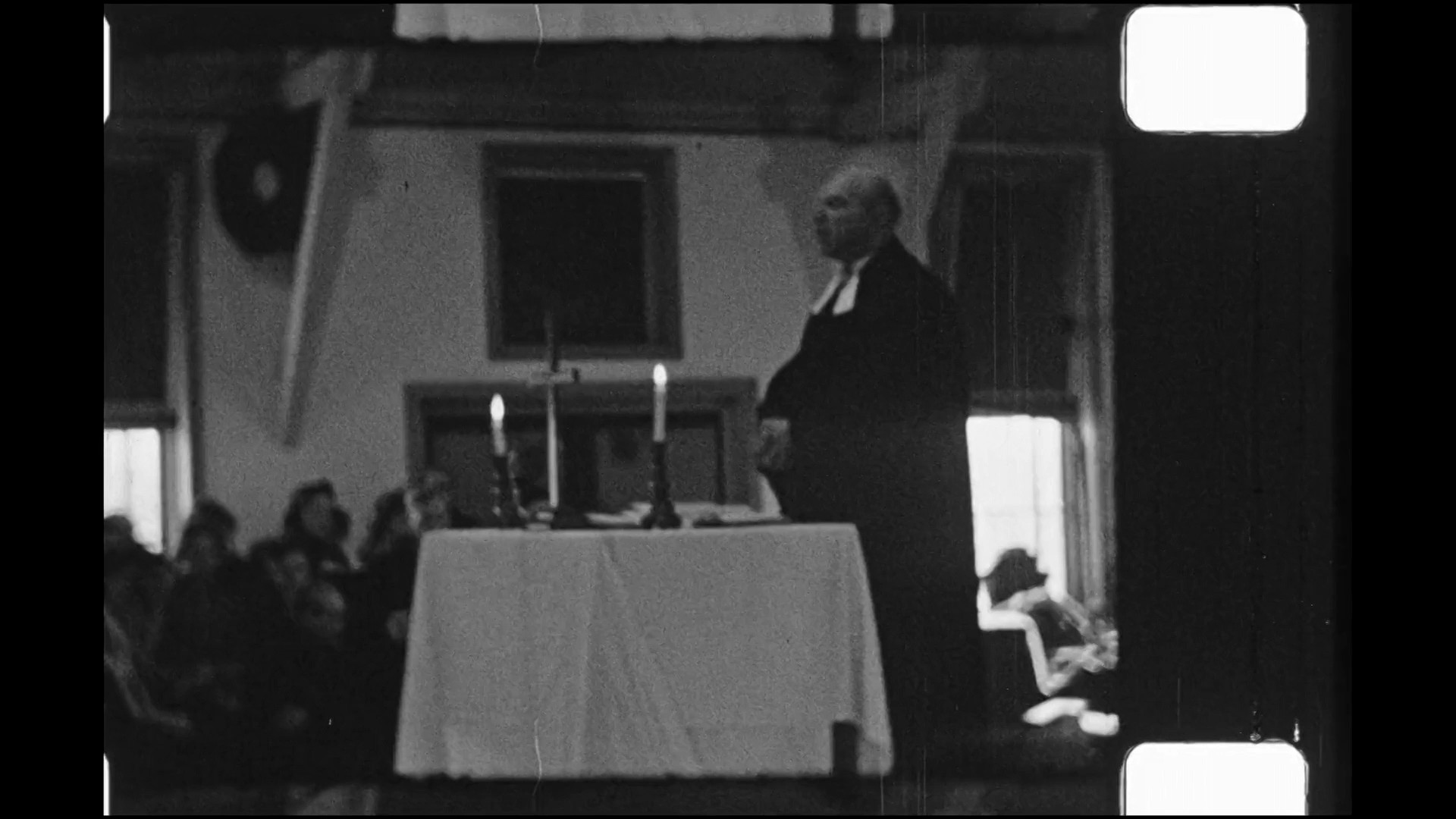

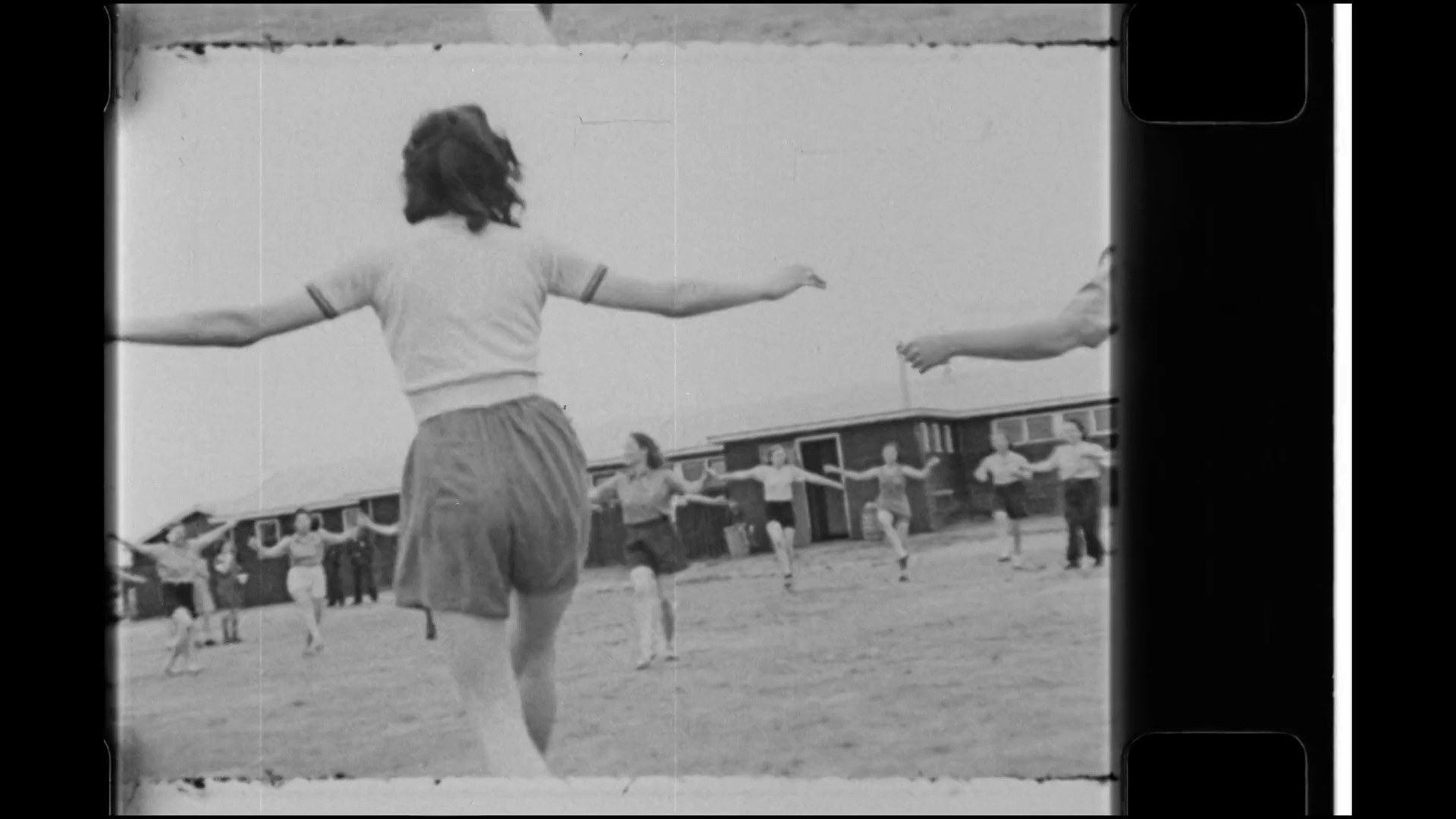

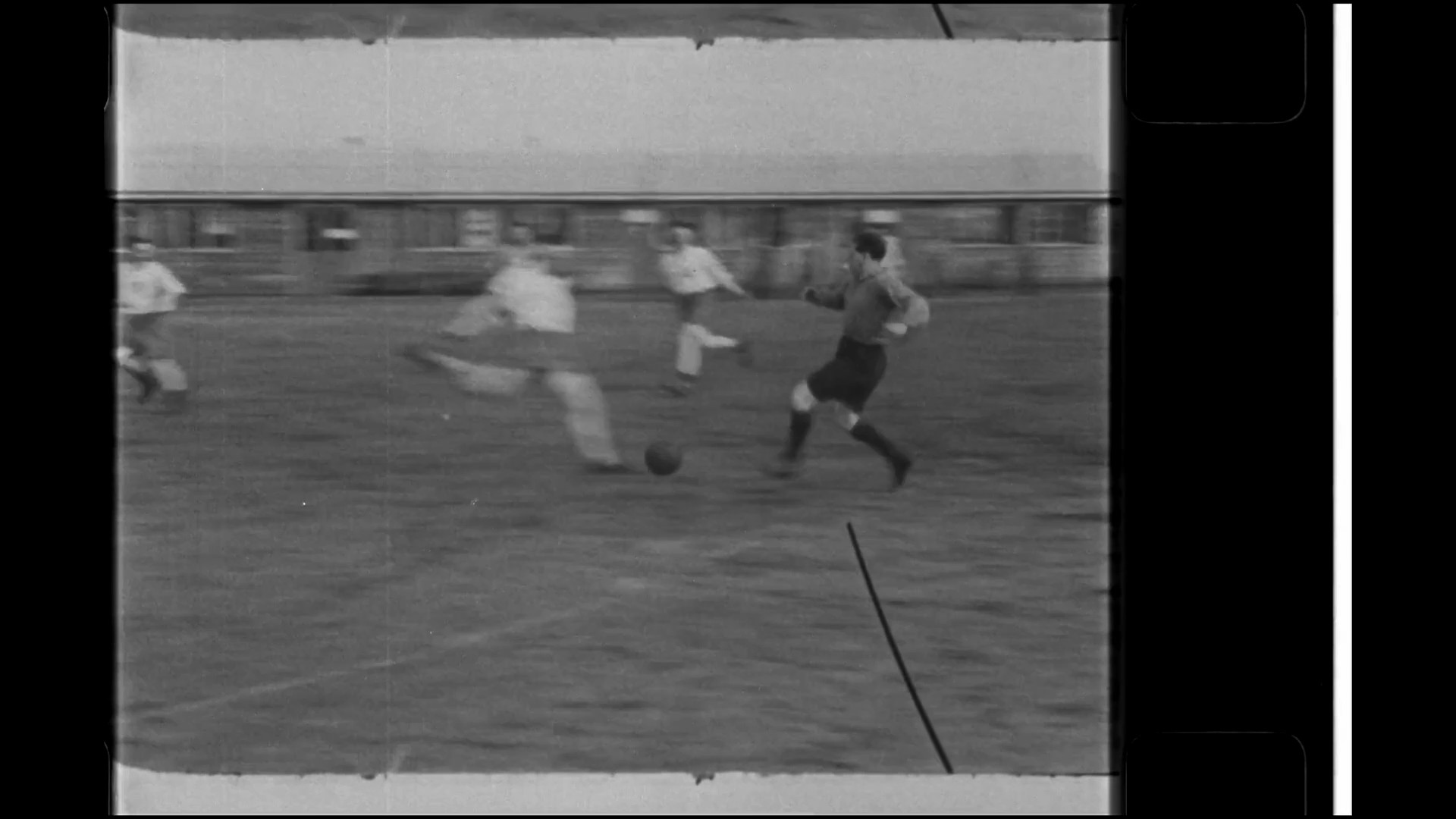

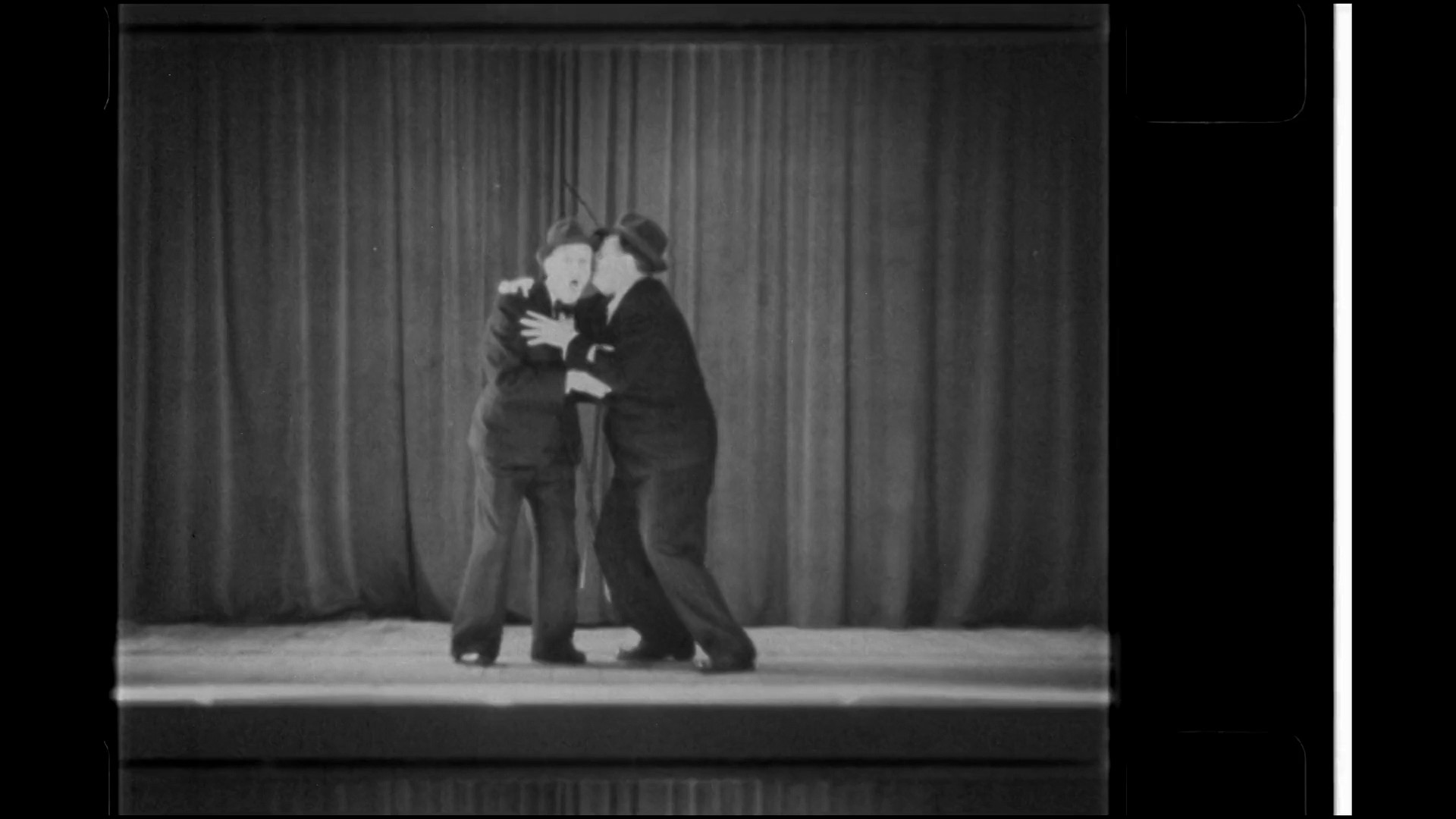

== References in popular culture ==
In 2007, Harun Farocki's short film Aufschub (Respite) brought renewed international attention to the archival footage, significantly raising its visibility. The footage was added by UNESCO to its Memory of the World international register in 2017. It has been declared public domain in the course of the application.

The scenes of the deportation on 19 May 1944 are today considered iconic images of the Holocaust. They appear in more than 500 documentaries and feature films, among them: Mein Kampf (1960), The 81st Blow (1974), Pillar of Fire (TV series) (1981), The Yellow Star: The Persecution of the Jews in Europe 1933–45 (1981), Genocide (1981 film), Aufschub (2007), The Number on Great-Grandpa's Arm (2018), Exterminate All the Brutes (2021), The U.S. and the Holocaust (2022).
