= Rudolf Breslauer =

German Jewish photographer and cameraman

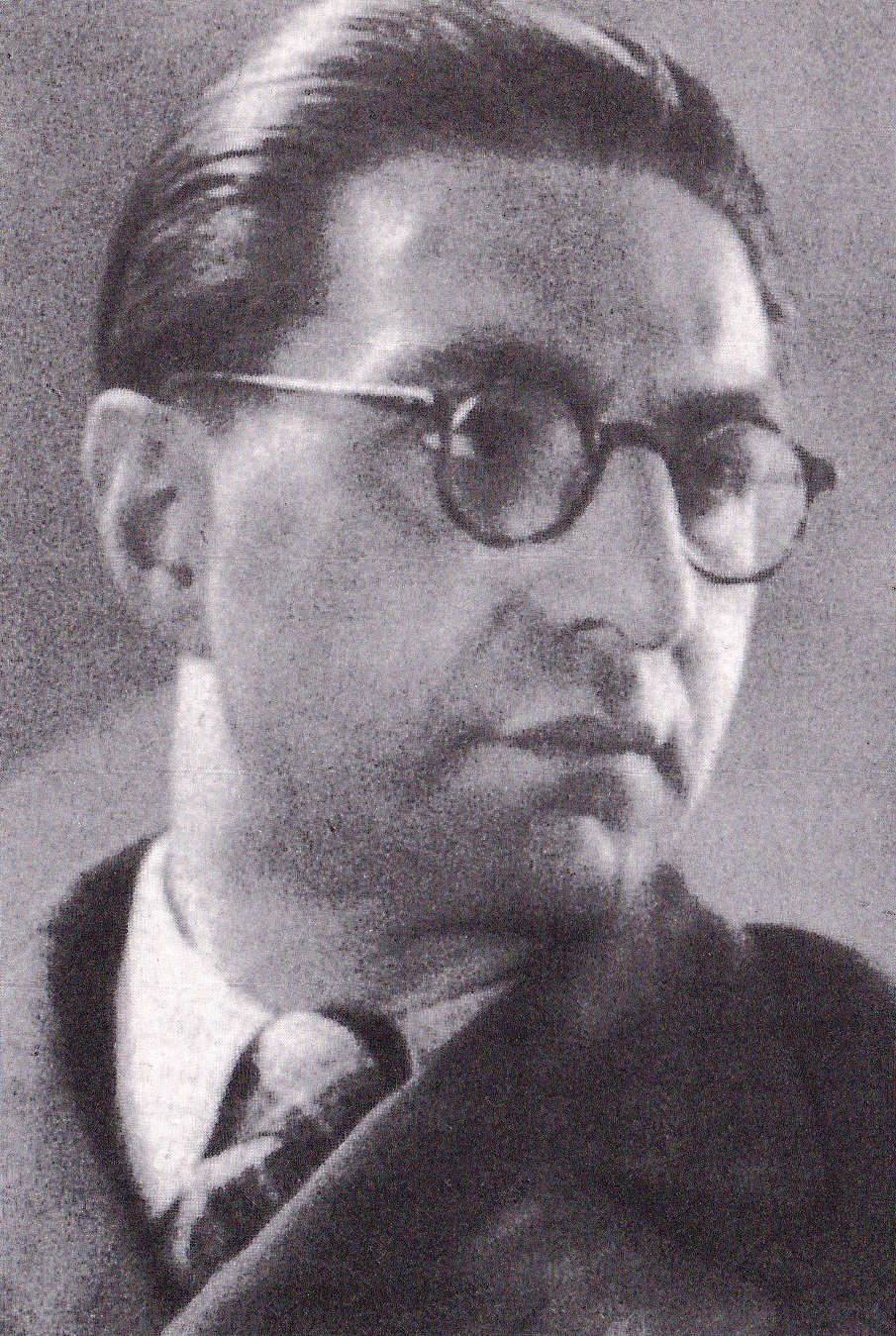
- Breslauer in the 1930s
- Born: Werner Rudolf Breslauer; 4 July 1903; Leipzig, German Empire
- Died: 28 February 1945 (aged 41); Auschwitz-Birkenau, German-occupied Poland
- Known for: Photography
- Website: Biographic details

Werner Rudolf Breslauer (4 July 1903 – 28 February 1945) was a German Jewish photographer who documented Nazi atrocities.

== Leipzig, the Netherlands, Westerbork, Auschwitz ==
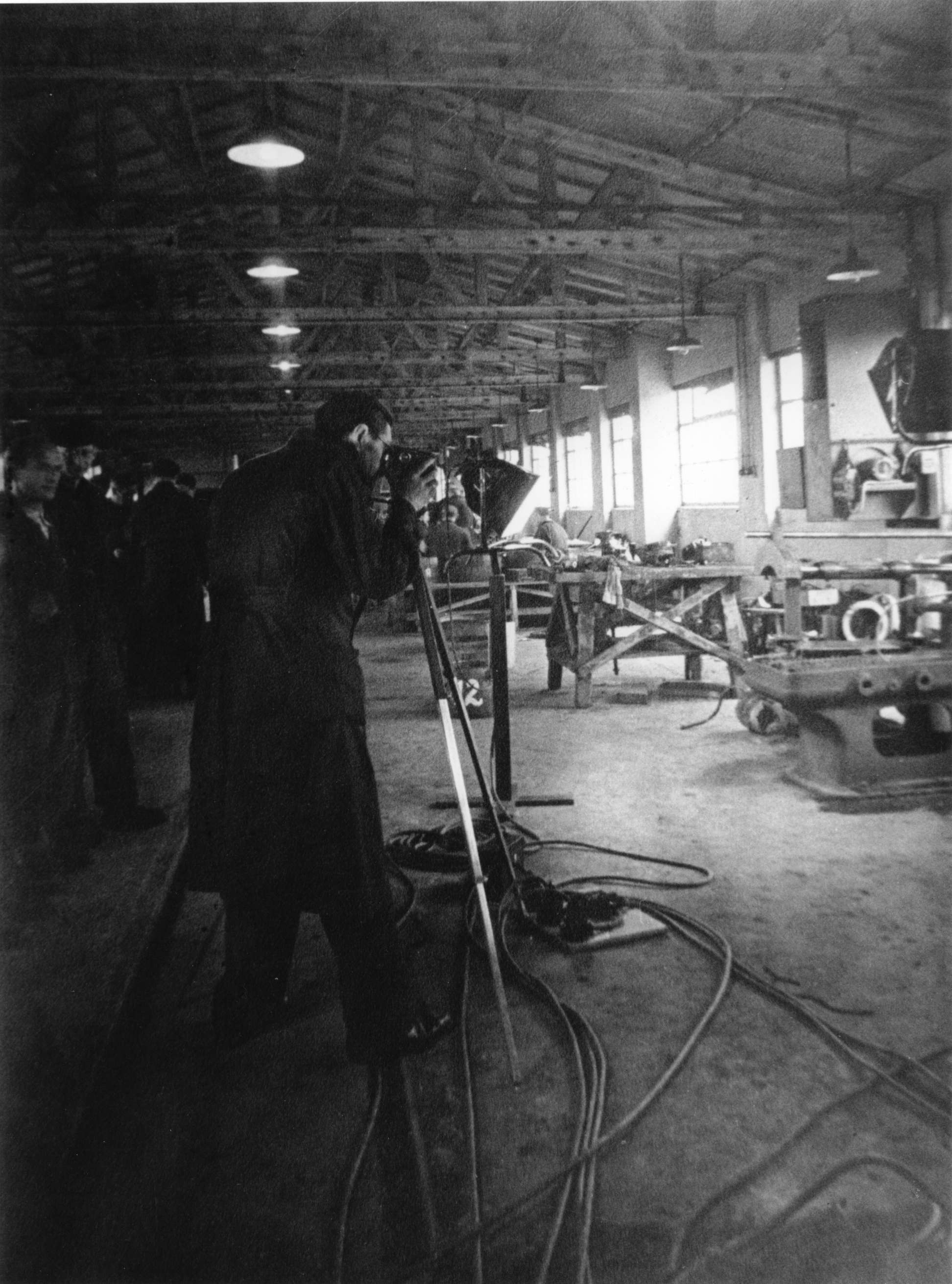
Rudolf Breslauer filming (1944)

Breslauer was born in Leipzig, where he was trained as a photographer and as a printer. In 1938, as the Nazis began the extermination of Jews, he fled to the Netherlands, where he lived and worked in Leiden, Alphen, and Utrecht. In 1942, Breslauer, his wife Bella Weissmann, sons Mischa and Stefan and daughter Ursula were imprisoned and deported to Westerbork transit camp. Camp commander Albert Konrad Gemmeker ordered Breslauer to make photographs and films of life in Westerbork. Breslauer and his family were transported to Auschwitz in the autumn of 1944. His wife and two sons were immediately killed, Rudolf Breslauer died a few months later. Their daughter Ursula survived the war.

== Photographs, stills and a film from Westerbork, by Breslauer ==
The German camp commander, Albert Gemmeker ordered Breslauer to document everyday life in the Westerbork transit camp. In 2017, these films, commonly referred to as Westerbork films, were submitted by the Netherlands and included in UNESCO's Memory of the World International Register.

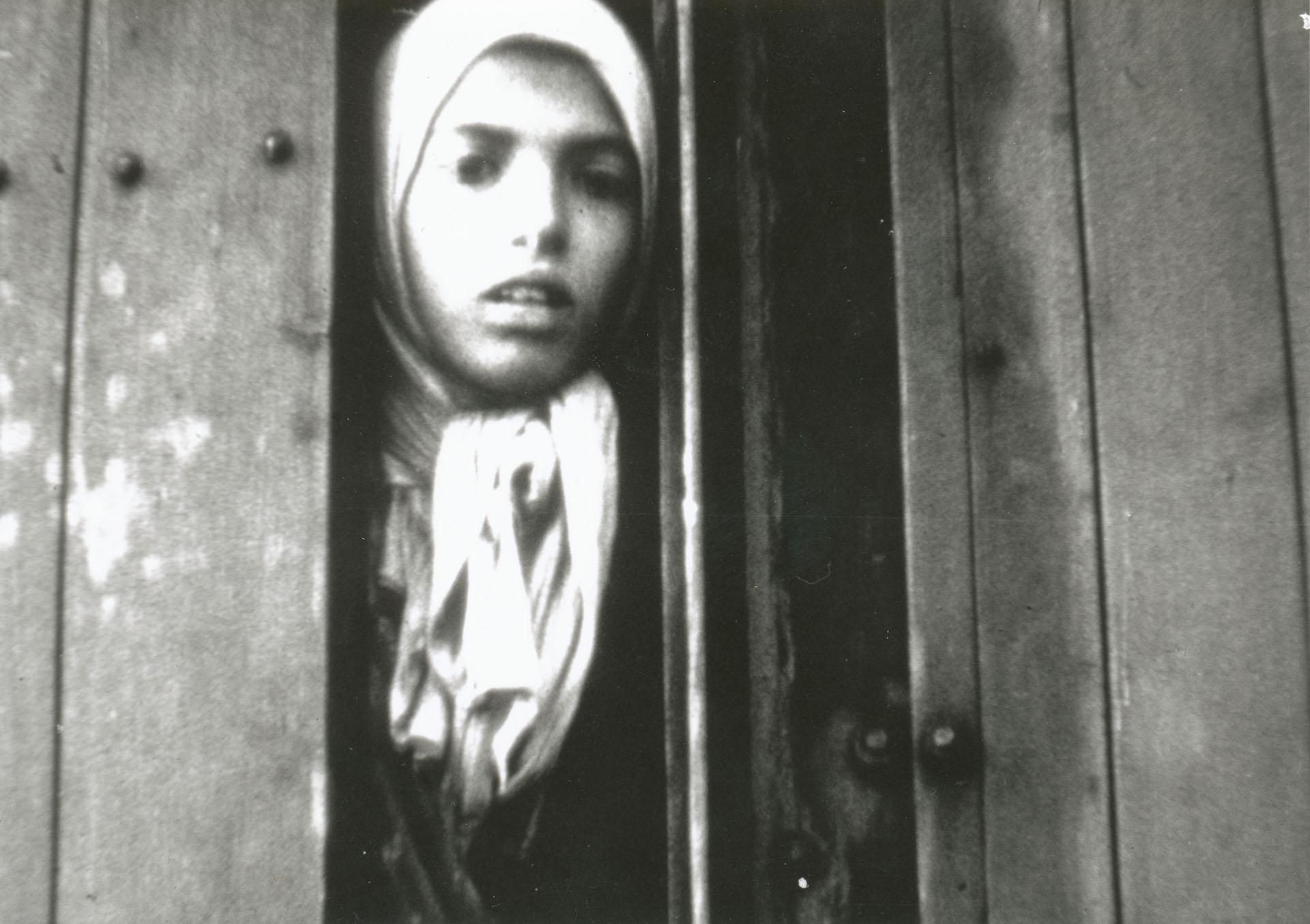
Settela Steinbach May 19th 1944

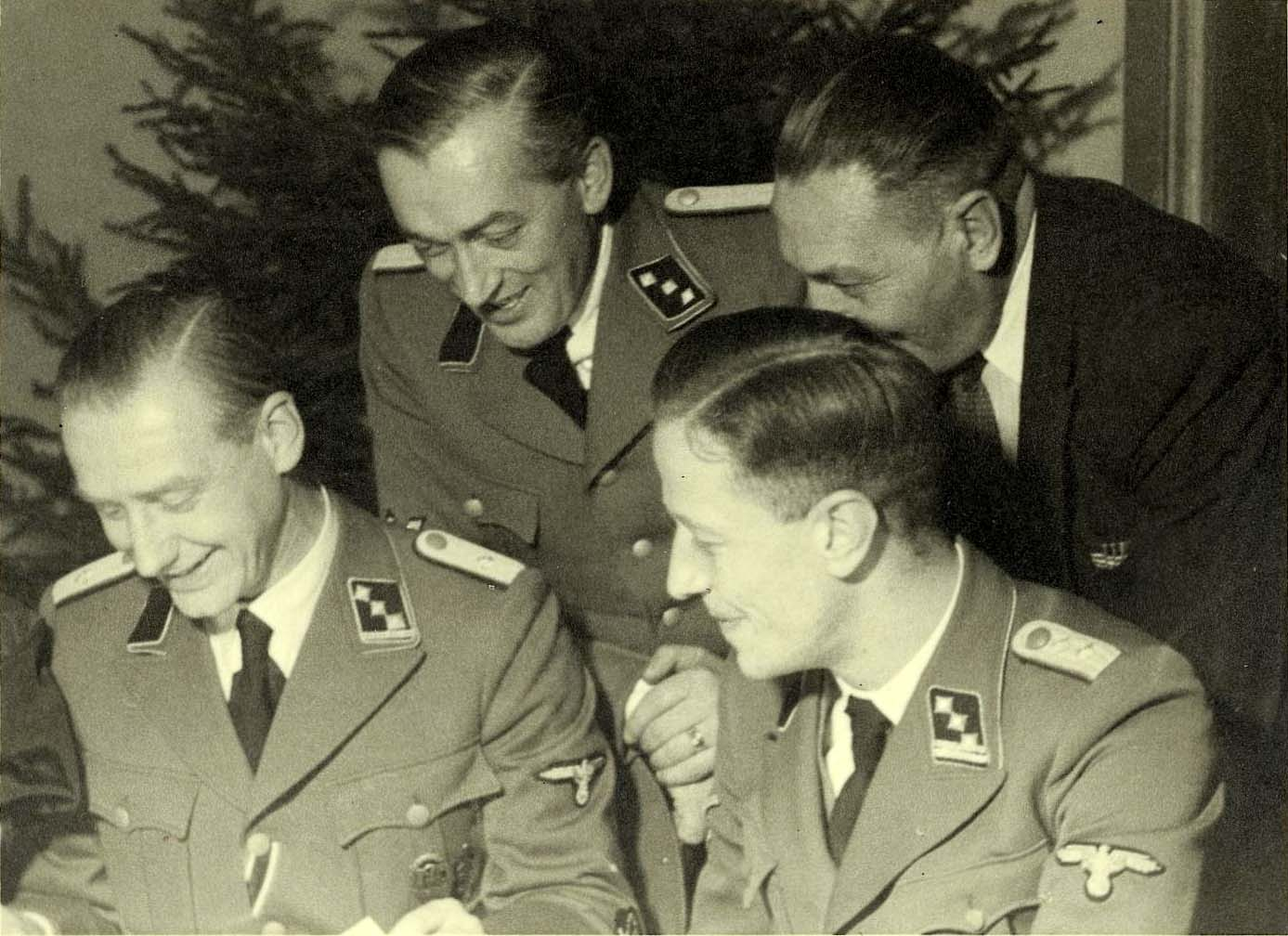
Christmas 1942 in Westerbork (from left to right) Albert Konrad Gemmeker, Hassel, Aus der Fünten and Scheltnes of Lippmann, Rosenthal & Co.

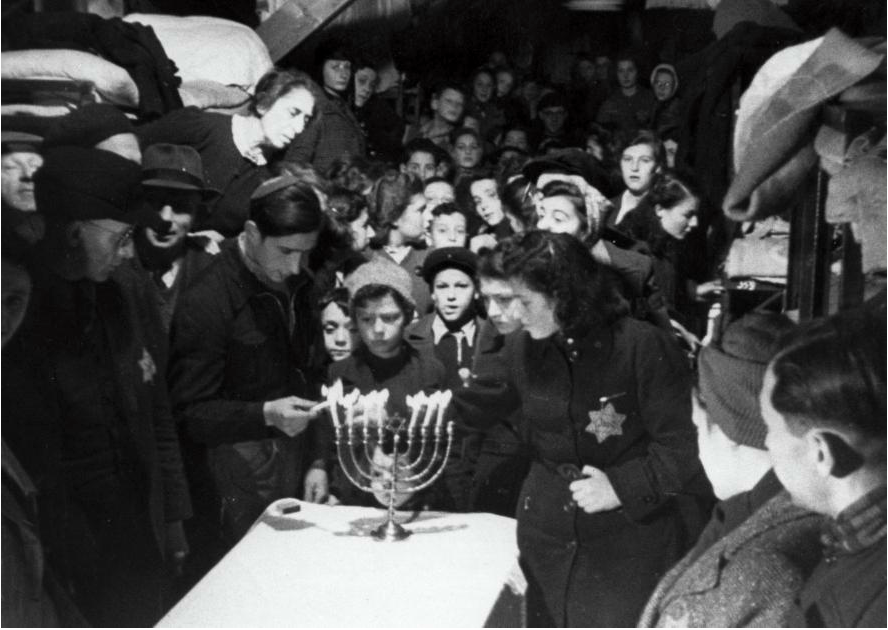
Hanukkah in Westerbork

Transport to Auschwitz (Westerbork film

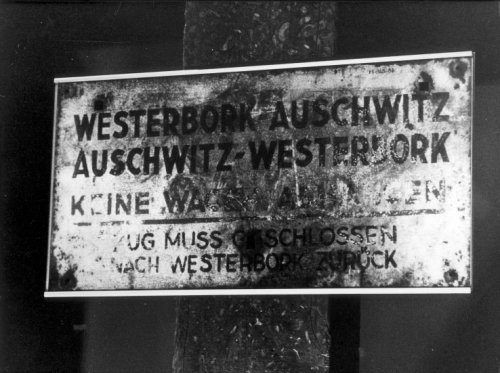
Train: No carriage ..... Train must be closed when returned to Westerbork
