= Westerbork transit camp =

Nazi transit camp for Jews in the occupied Netherlands

Westerbork
- Transit camp
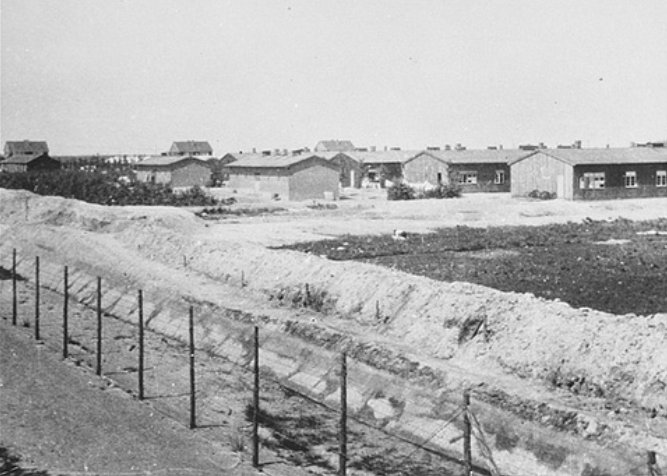
- Barracks at Westerbork after liberation

- Location within Netherlands
- Coordinates: 52°55′3″N 6°36′26″E
- Other names: Polizeiliches Durchgangslager Westerbork, Judendurchgangslager Westerbork
- Location: Westerbork, Drenthe, Netherlands
- Operated by: SS-Totenkopfverbände
- Original use: Refugee camp
- Operational: 1939 – 1940 (as a refugee camp); 1 July 1942 – 12 April 1945 (as a transit camp)
- Inmates: Jews, Roma, Sinti
- Number of inmates: 97,776 deported, mostly to Auschwitz and Sobibór; 876 liberated
- Liberated by: Canadian 2nd Infantry Division
- Notable inmates: Anne Frank, Margot Frank, Dora Gerson, Etty Hillesum, Philip Slier, Edith Stein, Selma Wijnberg-Engel, Max Ehrlich, Wilhelm Mautner, Ellen Burka, Walter Süskind, Settela Steinbach, Maurice Frankenhuis, Kurt Gerron
- Notable books: The Night of the Girondins
- Website: kampwesterbork.nl/en

Camp Westerbork (Dutch: Kamp Westerbork; German: Durchgangslager Westerbork; Drents: Börker Kamp, Kamp Westerbörk), also known as Westerbork transit camp, was a Nazi transit camp in the province of Drenthe in the northeastern Netherlands, during World War II. It was located in the municipality of Westerbork, current-day Midden-Drenthe. Camp Westerbork was used as a staging location for sending Jews, Sinti and Roma to concentration camps elsewhere.

== Purpose of Camp Westerbork ==
The camp location was established by the Government of the Netherlands in the summer of 1939 to serve as a refugee camp for Germans and Austrians (German and Austrian Jews in particular), who had fled to the Netherlands to escape Nazi persecution.

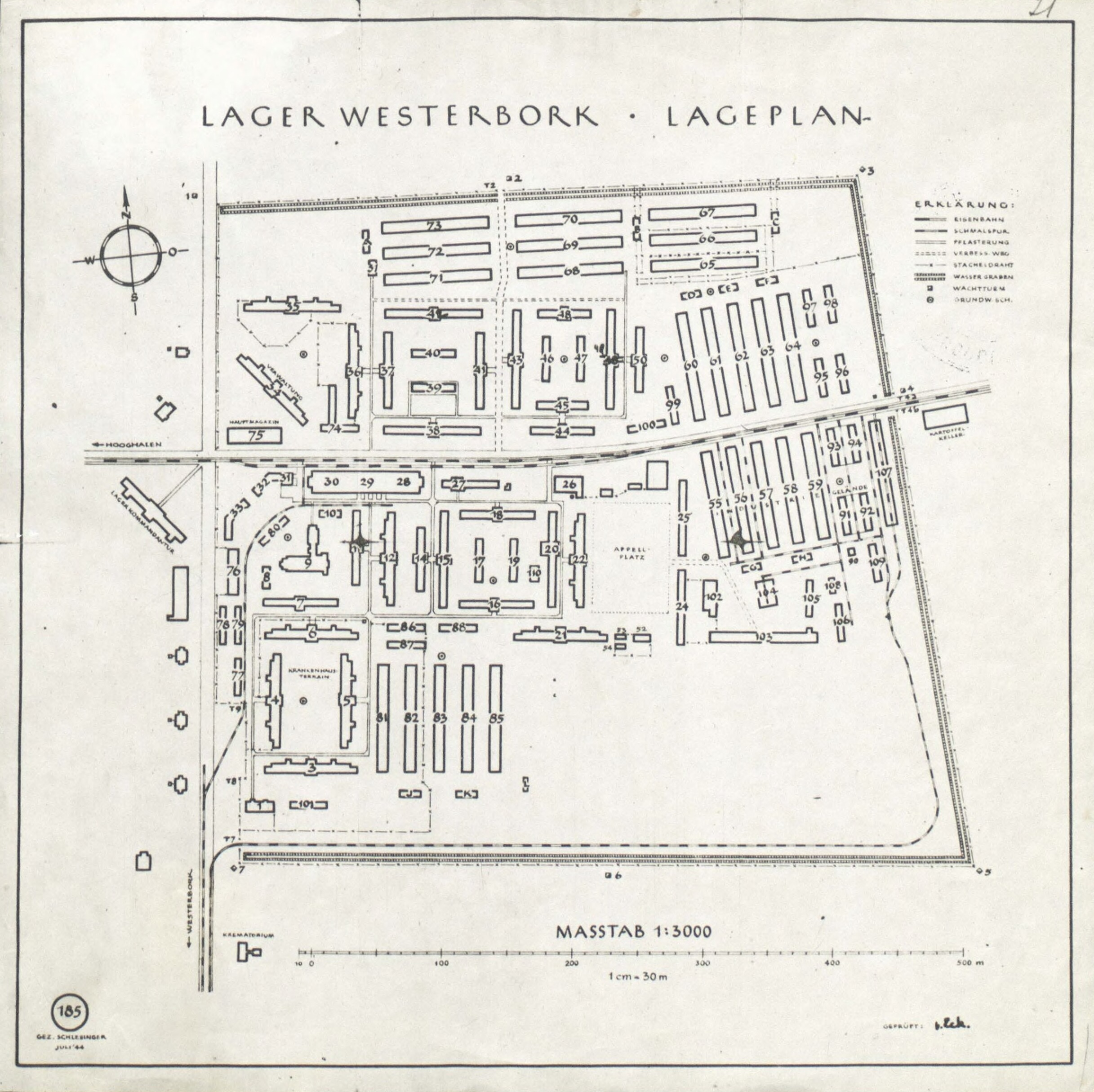
Map of Camp Westerbork

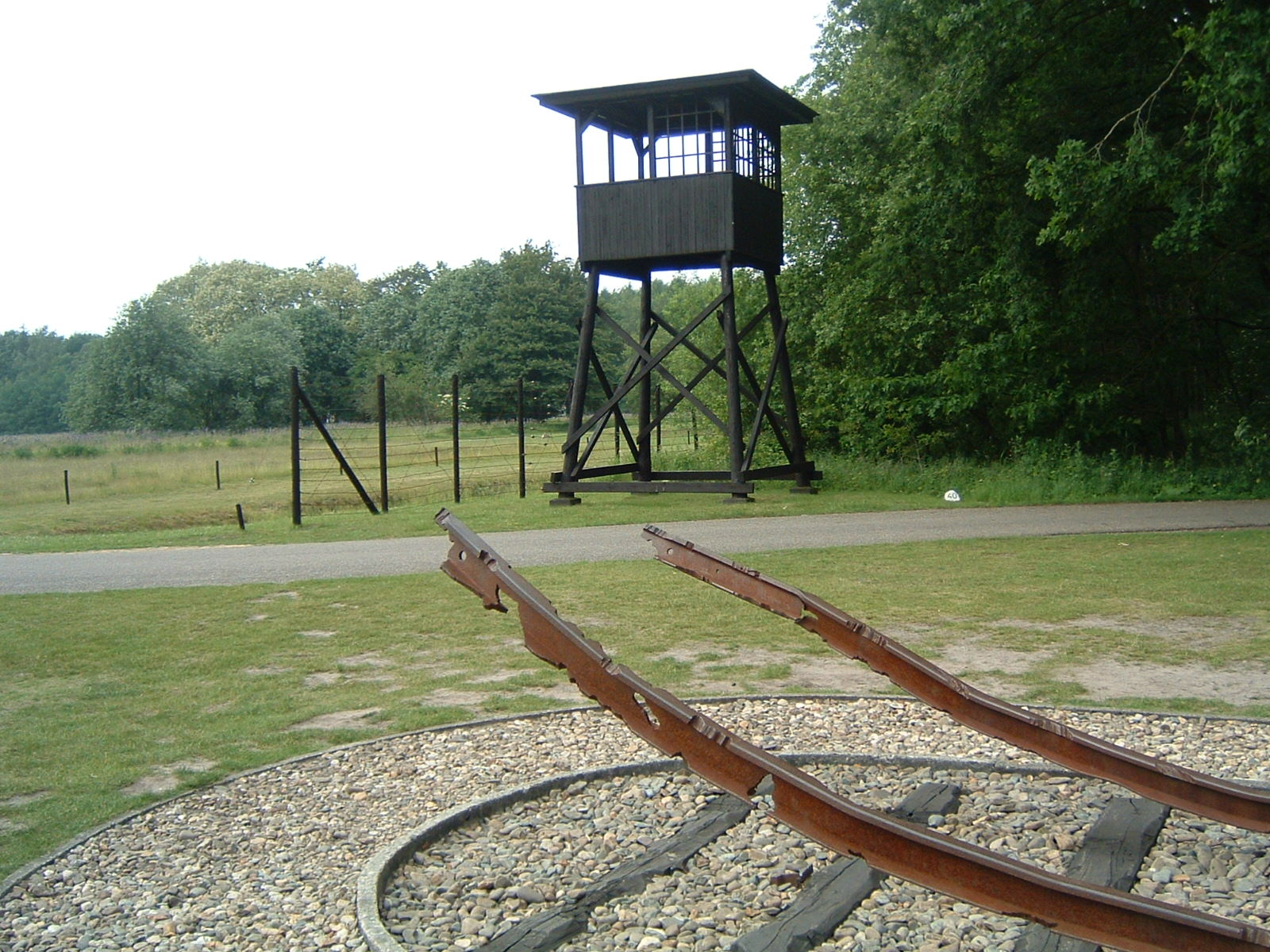
Reconstructed watchtower at Westerbork

However, after the German invasion of the Netherlands in May 1940, that original purpose no longer existed. By 1942, Camp Westerbork was repurposed as a staging ground for the deportation of Jews. Only 50 hectares (120 acres) in area, the camp was not built for the purpose of industrial murder as were Nazi extermination camps. Westerbork was considered by Nazi standards as "humane". Jewish, Sinti and Roma inmates with families were housed in 200 interconnected cottages that contained two rooms, a toilet, a hot plate for cooking, as well as a small yard. Single inmates were placed in oblong barracks which contained a bathroom for each sex.

Transport trains arrived at Westerbork every Tuesday from July 1942 to September 1944; an estimated 97,776 Jews, Sinti and Roma were deported during the period. Jewish, Sinti and Roma inmates were deported in waves to Auschwitz concentration camp (65 train-loads totaling 60,330 people), Sobibór (19 train-loads; 34,313 people), Theresienstadt Ghetto and Bergen-Belsen concentration camp (9 train-loads; 4,894 people). Almost all of the 94,643 persons deported to Auschwitz and Sobibór in German-occupied Poland were killed upon arrival.

Camp Westerbork also had a school, orchestra, hairdresser and even restaurants designed by SS officials to give inmates a false sense of hope for survival and to aid in avoiding problems during transportation. Cultural activities provided by the Nazis for designated deportees included metalwork, jobs in health services and other cultural activities.

A special, separate work cadre of 2,000 "permanent" Jewish, Sinti and Roma inmates were used as a camp labour force. Within this group was a subgroup constituting a camp police force which was required to assist with transports and keep order. The SS had little involvement with selecting transferees; this job fell to another class of inmates. Most of these 2,000 "permanent" inmates were eventually sent to concentration or death camps themselves.

=== Notable prisoners ===
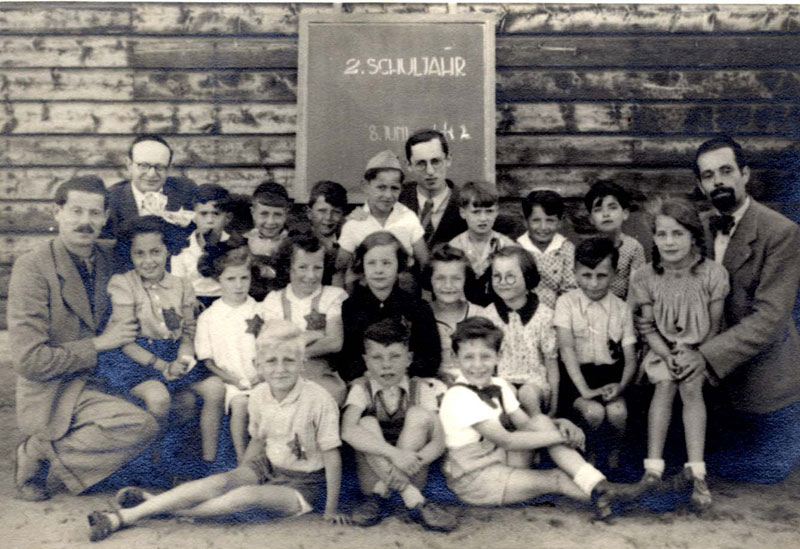
Class photo from the school within Westerbork

Notable prisoners in Westerbork included Anne Frank, who was transported to Camp Westerbork on 8 August 1944, as well as Etty Hillesum, each of whom wrote of their experiences in diaries discovered after the war. Frank remained at the camp in a small hut until 3 September, when she was deported to Auschwitz.

Hillesum was able to avoid the Nazi dragnet that identified Jews until April 1942. Even after being labeled a Jew, she began to report on antisemitic policies. She took a job with Judenrat for two weeks and then volunteered to accompany the first group of Jews sent to Westerbork. Hillesum stayed at Westerbork until 7 September 1943, when she was deported to Auschwitz, where she was killed three months later.

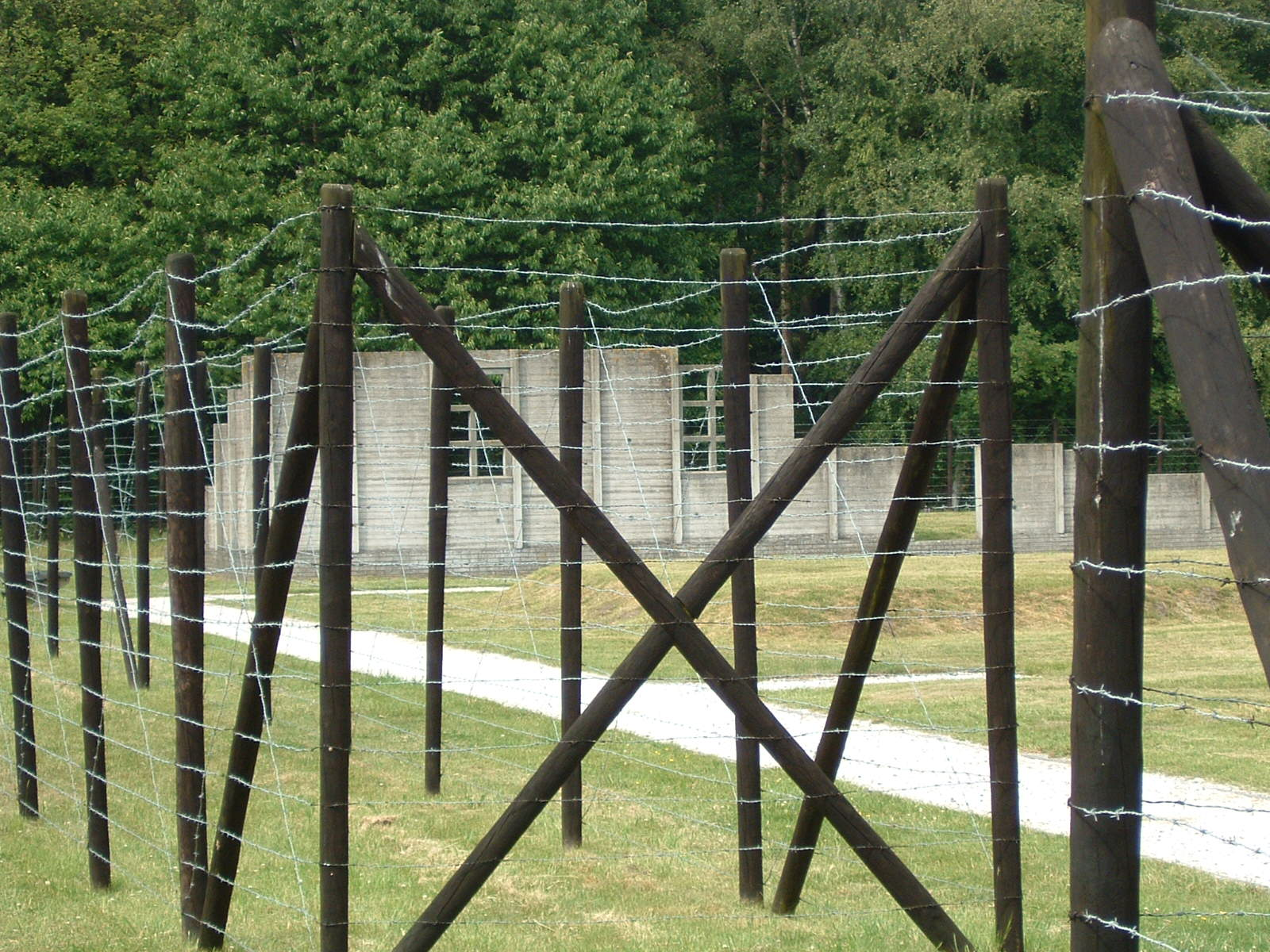
Parts of a rebuilt hut at Westerbork, which once held Anne Frank

Camp Westerbork also housed German film actress and cabaret singer Dora Gerson who was interned there with her family before being sent to Auschwitz and Professor Sir William Asscher who survived the camp when his mother secured his family's release by fabricating English ancestry. Jona Oberski wrote of his experience as a small child at Westerbork in his book, Kinderjaren ("Childhood"), published in the Netherlands in 1978 and later made into the film, Jonah Who Lived in the Whale.

Maurice Frankenhuis chronicled his family's experiences while interned in Westerbork and in 1948 conducted an interview with its Commander Albert Konrad Gemmeker while Gemmeker awaited trial. The published interview in Dutch and English became the basis for a docudrama created in September 2019. The film features colorization of original video of transports from Westerbork by photographer Rudolf Breslauer.

Another prisoner at Camp Westerbork from 9 March 1944 to 23 March 1944 was Hans Mossel (1905–1944), a Jewish-Dutch clarinetist and saxophonist, before he was sent to the Auschwitz III camp.

On 16 May 2024, a memorial was erected to remember the famous Sinti families Weiss (Tata Mirando) and Meinhardt, who lost some 200 members of their families to the Holocaust, transported from Westerbork camp to Auschwitz-Birkenau.

== Leadership within the Camp ==
Jacques Schol, a Dutchman, was commander of the camp from 16 July 1940 and until January 1943. Certain accounts report he was known for his brutality against Jewish inmates, allegedly kicking inmates to death. Other accounts state on the contrary that "although strict and organised, Schol was never cruel or violent". Furthermore, "Schol, who was anti-German, understood that a strict organisation of the camp was the best way to keep the Germans from taking over the camp". In 1941, German authorities understood that "Schol was too lenient and because of this attitude, the Jews felt too comfortable in the camp".

German authorities took control of Westerbork from the Government of the Netherlands on 1 July 1942 when Schol was replaced by a German commander. Deportations began under the orders of Gestapo sub-Department IV-B4, which was headed by Adolf Eichmann. Gestapo officer Albert Konrad Gemmeker had overall command of the camp and was responsible for sending up to 100,000 Jews to the death camps. After the war, Gemmeker was sentenced to just ten years in prison. His light sentence was apparently due to his defense claim that he had no idea what would happen to the Jews after they were transported out of Westerbork. Within the confines of the camp, German SS members were in charge of inmates, but squads of Jewish police and security under Kurt Schlesinger were used to keep order and aid in transport.

== Liberation ==
Transports came to a halt at Camp Westerbork in September 1944. Allied troops neared Westerbork in early April 1945 after German officials abandoned the camp. Westerbork was liberated by Canadian forces on 12 April 1945. A total of 876 inmates were found. The War Diary of the South Saskatchewan Regiment referenced the camp in its entry for 12 April 1945:

At 0930 hrs Lt-Col V Stott, DSO, accompanied by the I(ntelligence)O(fficer), Lt JD Cade, visited the Jewish Concentration Camp at (map reference) 2480. It was a rather startling sight as you approached the camp to see what is normally the appearance of a penitentiary. It was completely surrounded with barbed wire and had four lookout towers. Approximately 900 people were being held in this camp. The CO visited the officers kitchens and medical room and found the food and medical supplies to be in fairly good condition. While in the kitchen a number of A Co(mpan)y boys were observed helping the girls peel potatoes. It's surprising the influence girls, especially pretty ones, have with soldiers. It's a pity our cooks are unable to apply the same methods. Visiting a camp like this brings home to us the reality of what we are fighting for. It makes the average Canadian indignant and he asks "Who do the Germans think they are that they enclose other humans behind barbed wire simply because they are born Jews!"

== Post World War II ==
Following the war, Westerbork was first used as a remand prison for alleged and accused Nazi collaborators. It housed later Dutch nationals who fled the former Dutch East Indies (Indonesia).

Westerbork was completely disassembled in the 1960s by the Government of the Netherlands. Later, the Dutch built the Westerbork Synthesis Radio Telescope, a large radio telescope, on the site. Only the former camp commander's house has been preserved, in a glass container.

=== Historiography ===
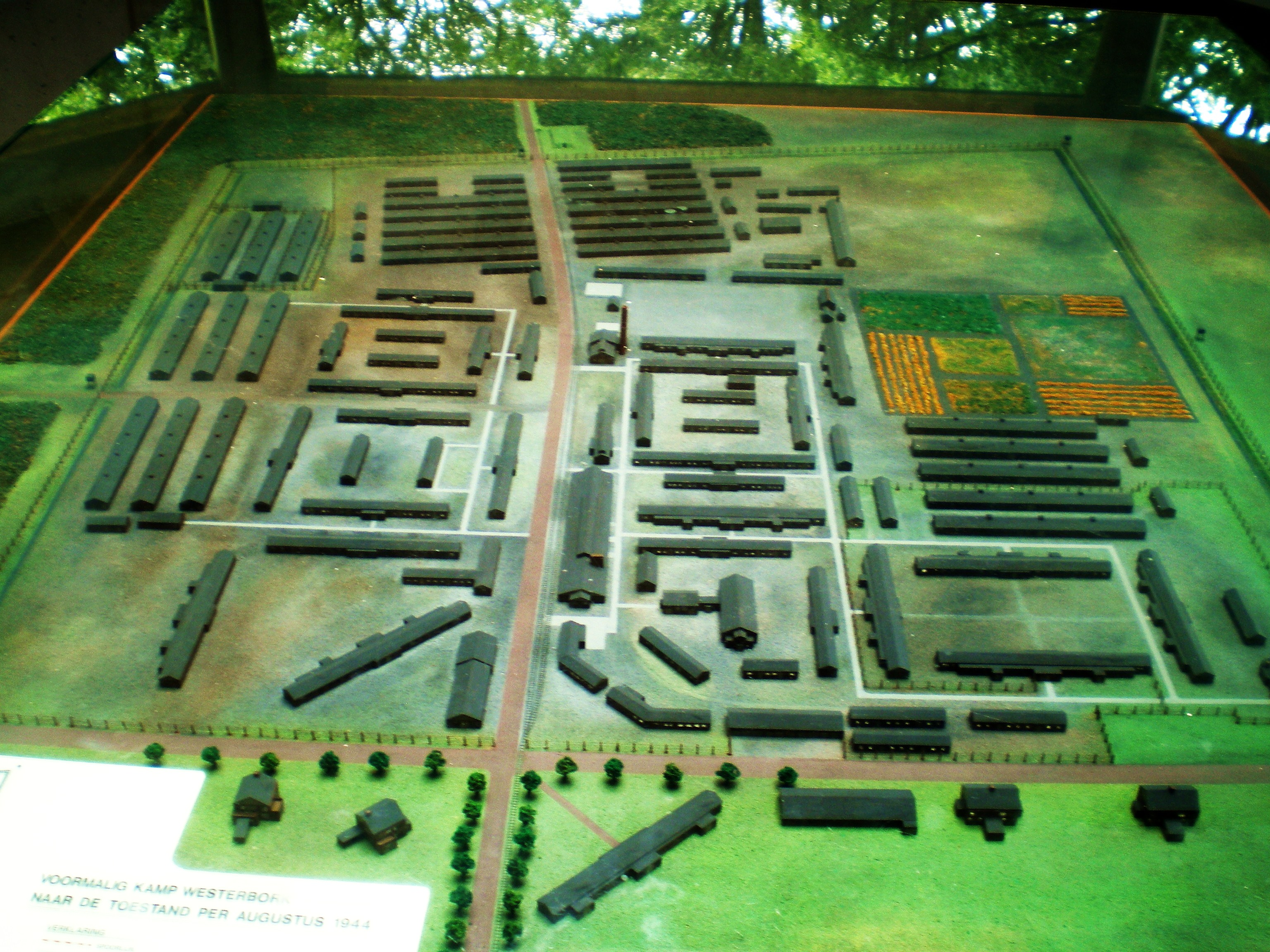
Model of the Westerbork concentration camp

In 1950, the government appointed Jewish historian Jacques Presser to investigate the events connected with the mass deportation of Dutch Jewry and the extent of the collaboration by the non-Jewish Dutch population. The results were published fifteen years later in The Catastrophe (De Ondergang). Presser also published a novel, The Night of the Girondins, which was set in Westerbork.

=== Holding place for Moluccan soldiers ===
In 1949, when the Dutch left their over 300 year occupation of Indonesia, native Indonesians were left in political unrest. Some people who had worked with French, Algerian and Dutch militaries were evacuated, because they were the subject of anger by the other indigenous people who had resisted colonisation and felt betrayed at the Moluccan peoples siding with their colonisers. The peoples were promised a quick return to their homeland. However, from 1951 to 1971, former indigenous Moluccan KNIL soldiers and their families were made to stay in the camp. During this time, the camp was renamed Kamp Schattenberg (Camp Schattenberg).

=== Memorials ===
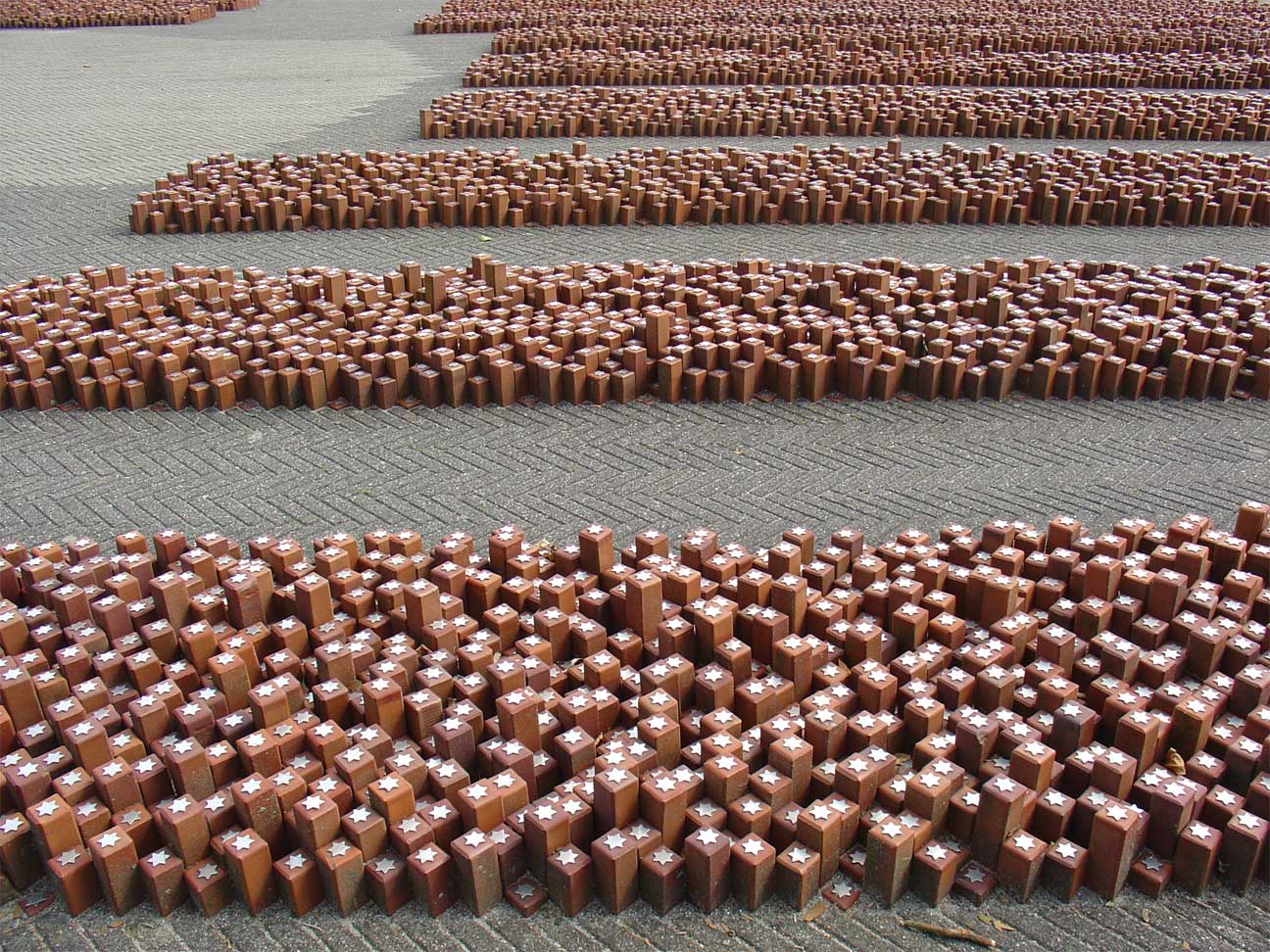
"The 102,000 stones" monument at Westerbork. Each individual stone represents a single person that stayed at Westerbork and was killed in Nazi concentration and extermination camps.

A museum was created two miles from Westerbork to keep the memories of those imprisoned in the camp alive. As a tribute to those inmates who were killed after deportation, a memorial was commissioned; it consists of 102,000 stones, representing each person who was deported from Westerbork and never returned.

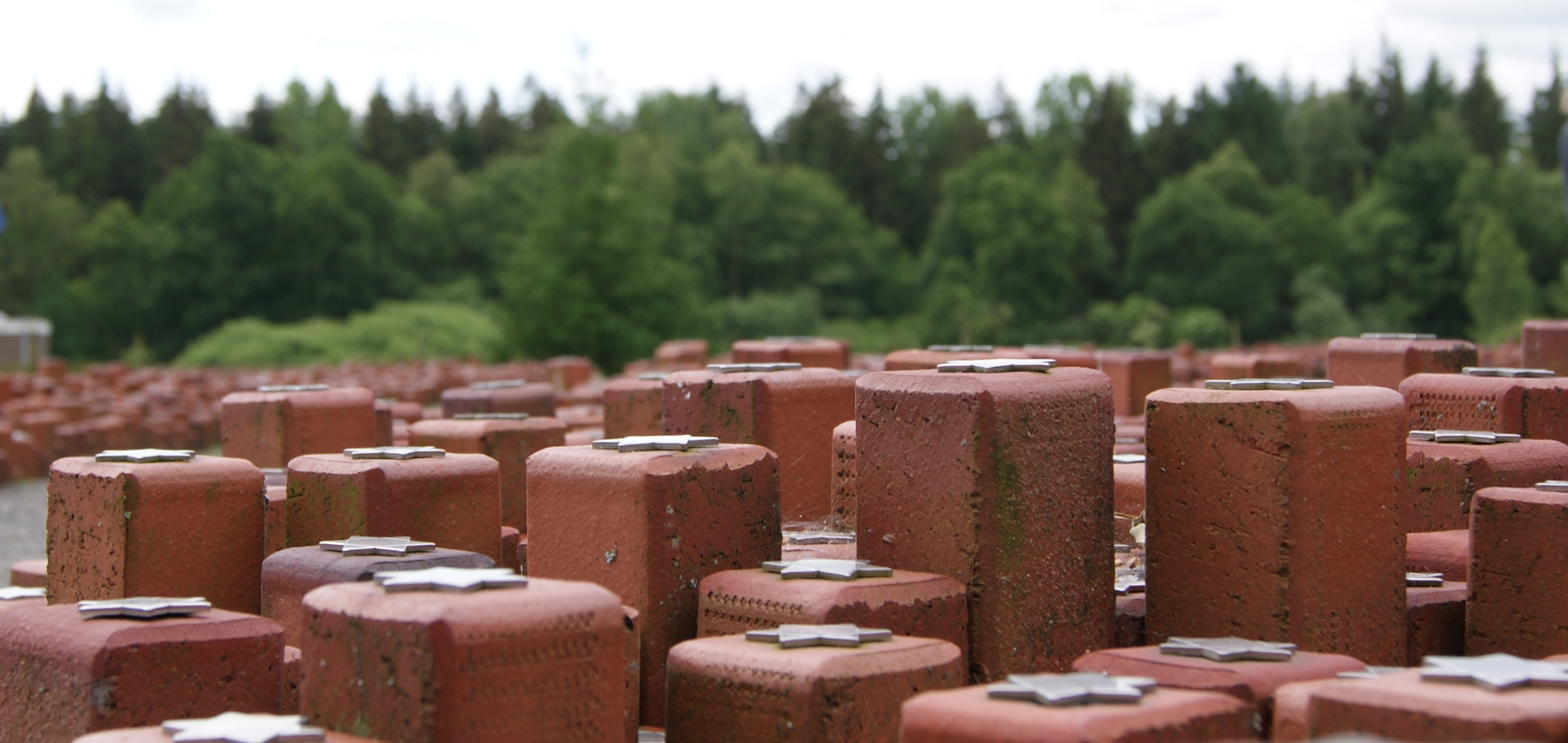
Memorial stones at Camp Westerbork

The National Westerbork Memorial was unveiled at the site by Queen Juliana of the Netherlands on 4 May 1970. Also, a monument of a broken railroad track torn from the ground is displayed near the camp to symbolize the destruction the camp, as well as others, wrought on the European Jewish population, and the determination that the tracks would never again carry people to their deaths.

In 2017, films commissioned by the German camp commander Albert Gemmeker from a Jewish prisoner, Rudolf Breslauer, to document everyday life in the Westerbork transit camp, were submitted by the Netherlands and included in the UNESCO's Memory of the World Register.

== See also ==
- Herzogenbusch concentration camp
- Amersfoort concentration camp
- Camp Barneveld
