= Settela Steinbach =

Dutch girl who was gassed in Auschwitz-Birkenau extermination camp

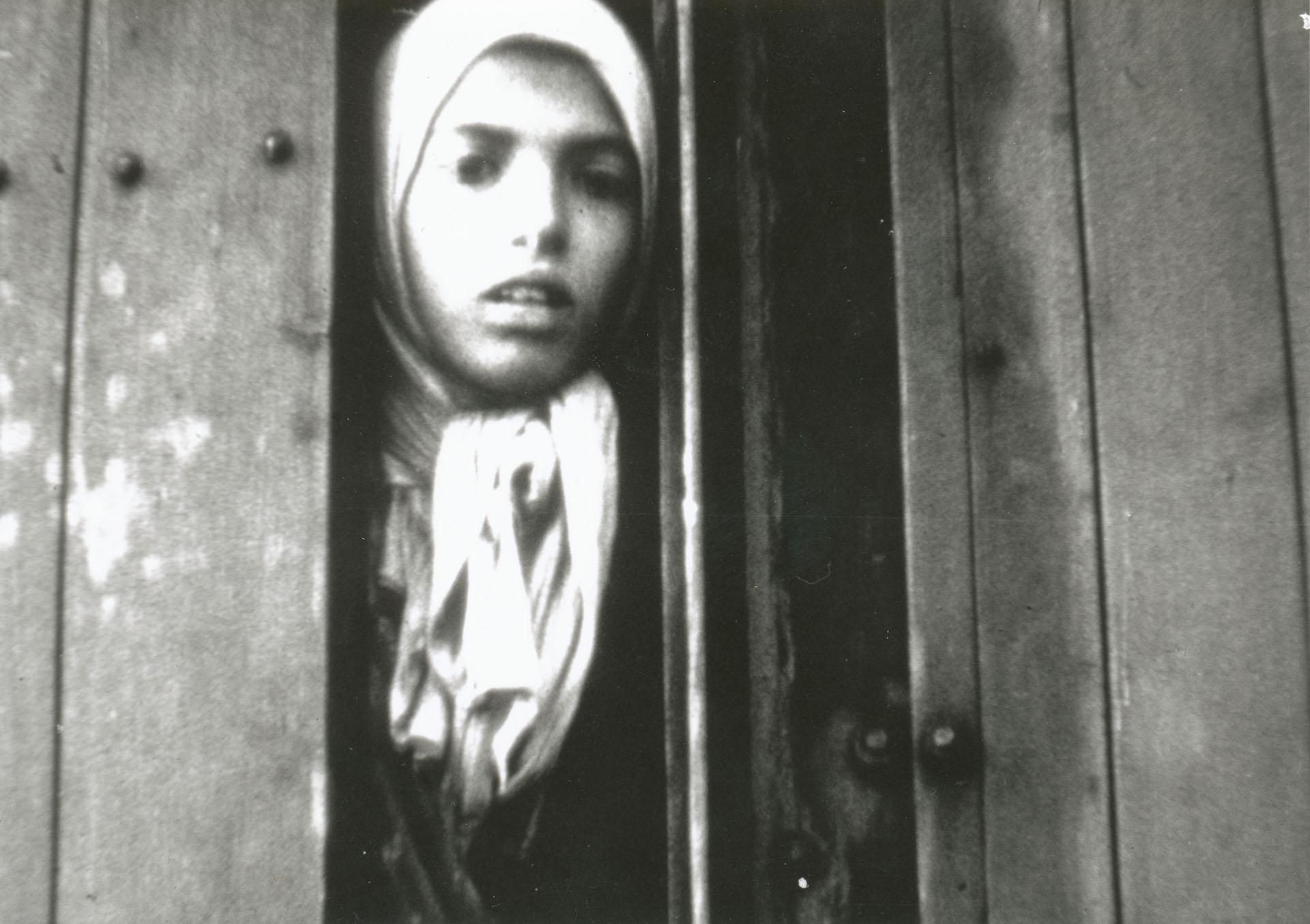
- Image of Settela Steinbach taken from a movie about life in Camp Westerbork filmed by Rudolf Breslauer
- Born: Anna Maria Steinbach; 23 December 1934; Buchten, Netherlands
- Died: 31 July 1944 (aged 9); Auschwitz-Birkenau, German-occupied Poland
- Other names: The girl with the headdress

Anna Maria (Settela) Steinbach (23 December 1934, Buchten – 31 July 1944) was a Dutch girl who was gassed in Nazi Germany's Auschwitz-Birkenau extermination camp. Initially identified as a Dutch Jew, her personal identity and association with the Sinti group of the Romani people were discovered in 1994.

== Life ==
Steinbach was born in Buchten as the daughter of a trader and violinist. On 14 May 1944, a razzia against the Romani was organized in the whole of the Netherlands. Steinbach was arrested in Eindhoven. That very same day, she arrived with another 577 people in Westerbork concentration camp. 279 people were allowed to leave again because although they lived in trailers, they were not Romani. In Westerbork, Steinbach's head was shaved as a preventive measure against head lice. Like the other Romani girls and women, she wore a torn sheet around her head to cover her bald head.

On 19 May, Settela was put on a transport together with 244 other Romani to Auschwitz-Birkenau on a train that also contained Jewish prisoners. Right before the doors were being closed, she apparently stared through the opening at a passing dog or the German soldiers. Rudolf Breslauer, a Jewish prisoner in Westerbork, who was shooting a movie on orders of the German camp commander, filmed the image of Settela's fearful glance staring out of the wagon. Crasa Wagner was in the same wagon and heard Settela's mother call her name and warn her to pull her head out of the opening. Wagner survived Auschwitz and was able to identify Settela in 1994.

== Death ==
On 22 May, the Dutch Romani, among them Steinbach, arrived in Auschwitz-Birkenau. They were registered and taken to the Romani section. Romani who were fit to work were taken to ammunition factories in Germany. The remaining three thousand Romani were gassed in the period from July to 3 August. Steinbach, her mother, two brothers, two sisters, aunt, two nephews and niece were part of this latter group. Of the Steinbach family, only the father survived; he died in 1946 and is buried in the cemetery of Maastricht.

== Legacy ==
After the war, the fragment of seven seconds in Breslauer's movie was used in many documentaries. The image of the anonymous young girl staring out of the wagon full of fear and about to be transported to Auschwitz became an icon of the Holocaust. Until 1994, she was only known as "the girl with the headdress". It was assumed she was Jewish, as for many years there was little attention paid to the genocide of the 500,000 to 1,500,000 Romani that were killed by the Germans in the Porajmos throughout Europe.

In December 1992, Dutch journalist Aad Wagenaar started to research her identity. By following the number on the outside of the wagon, number 10, 16 or 18, the description of the wagon, and the identity of a single suitcase that appears in the shot, he quickly discovered that the transport took place on 19 May 1944 and that it was a mixed transport of Dutch Romani and Jews. On 7 February 1994 at a trailer camp in Spijkenisse, Crasa Wagner was able to remember and to reveal the name of Settela Steinbach.

The quest for Settela Steinbach's identity was documented in Cherry Duyns' documentary Dutch: Settela, gezicht van het verleden, lit. 'Settela, Face of the Past'(1994). Wagenaar published his research in the book Dutch: Settela; het meisje heeft haar naam terug, lit. 'Settela; the girl got her name back',
