= Monument to the Lost Children =

Memorial in Vught, Netherlands

Coordinates: 51°40′1.3″N 5°15′34.2″E

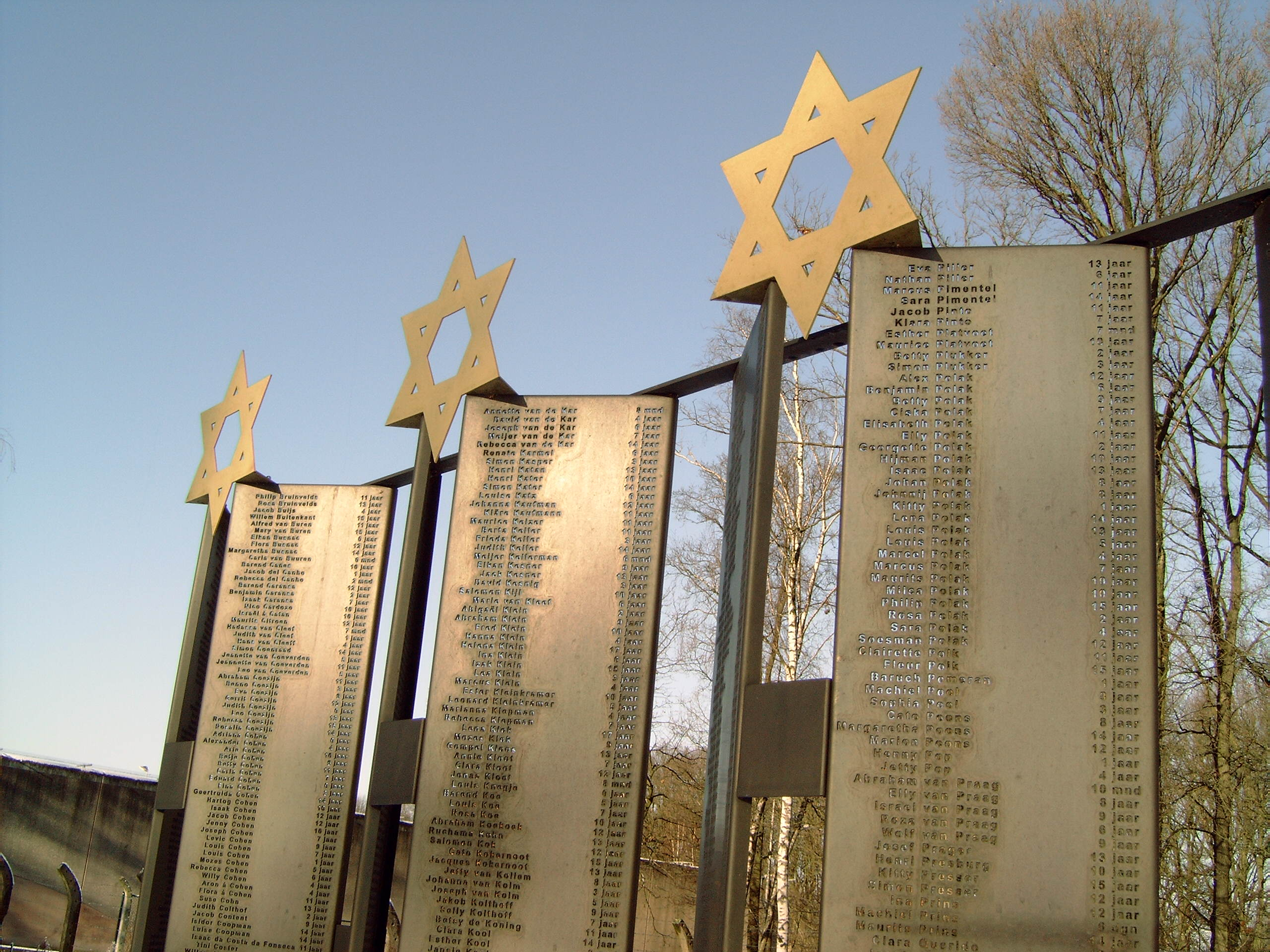
- Artist: Teus van den Berg-Been
- Year: 1999
- Type: Natural stone and bronze
- Location: National Monument Camp Vught, Vught

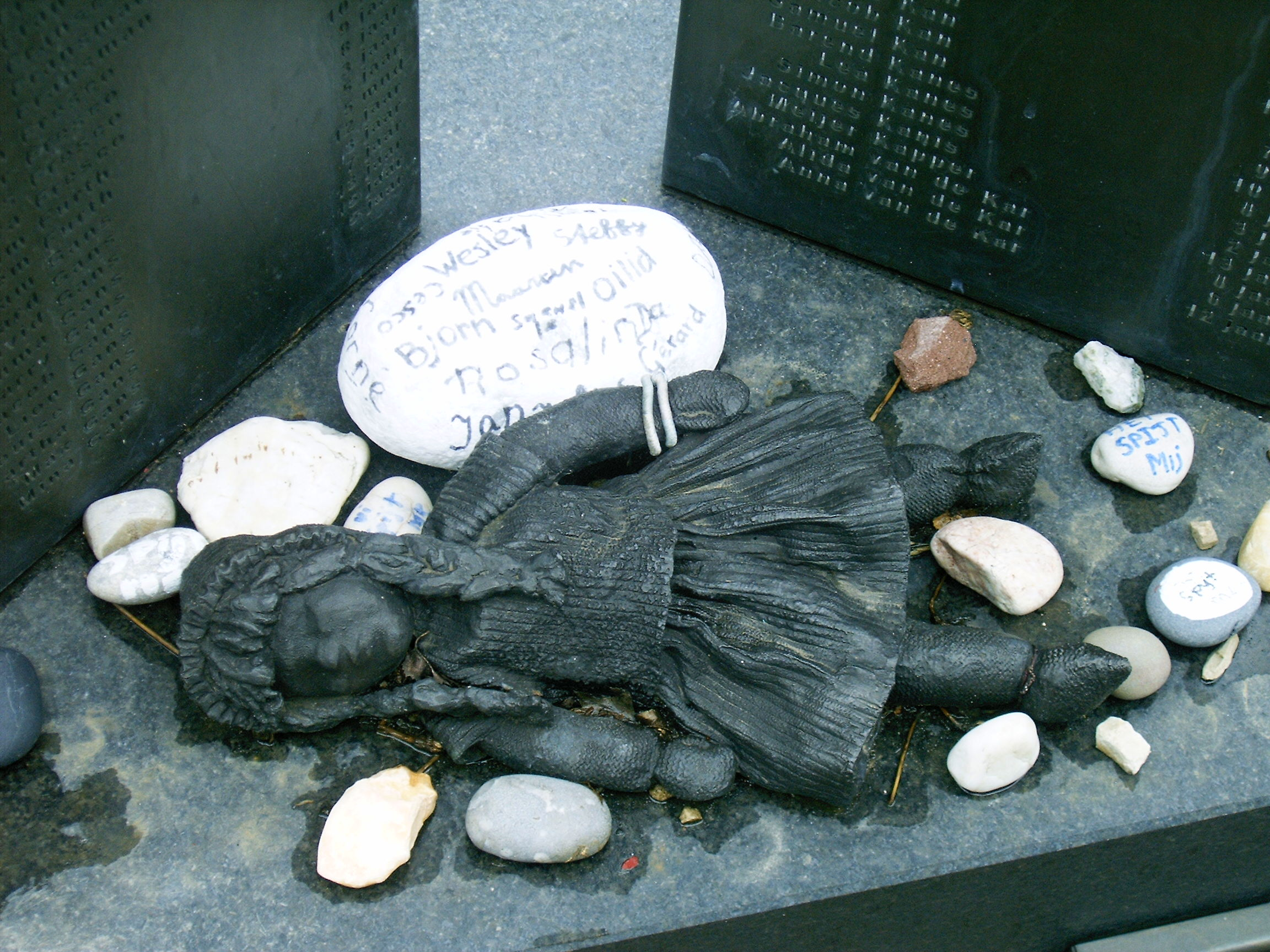
Bronze toys in memory of the children who perished at Kamp Vught

The Monument to the Lost Children (also known as the Children's Monument) is a memorial in Vught, Netherlands. The monument is located on the grounds of the National Monument Camp Vught and was erected to commemorate the children's transports on June 6 and 7, 1943, from Camp Vught via Camp Westerbork to Sobibór. More than a thousand Jewish children and their parents were transported under the pretense of relocation to a special children's camp. Upon arrival at the extermination camp Sobibór in occupied Poland, they were immediately gassed.

== Description ==
The monument was created by Teus van den Berg-Been and unveiled on September 5, 1999, by the Stichting Vriendenkring Nationaal Monument Vught. It consists of a base made of natural stone with bronze memorial plaques. The plaques are connected at the top with Stars of David. The names of all 1,269 children, along with their ages, are inscribed on the plaques. The lowest plaque bears a passage from the Bible:

THE CHILD IS NOT...AND I,
WHERE SHALL I GO!Gusen concentration camp
GENESIS 37:30

In front of the plaques lies cast bronze toys. The inscription on the plaque at the base of the monument reads:

MORE THAN 1800 JEWISH CHILDREN WERE TRANSPORTED FROM HERE
TO EXTERMINATION CAMPS.
ONLY A FEW SURVIVED
THE NAMES OF 1269 OF THESE CHILDREN ARE INSCRIBED HERE
THEY WERE DEPORTED WITH THE CHILDREN'S TRANSPORT ON JUNE 6 AND 7, 1943
AND KILLED
IN THEIR MEMORY, WE COMMEMORATE ALL THE CHILDREN WHO WERE DEPORTED FROM KAMP VUGHT
NEVER TO RETURN
MAY THEIR SOULS BE BOUND IN THE BUNDLE OF THE ETERNAL LIFE

== Commemoration ==
An annual commemoration ceremony is held at the children's memorial on or around June 6.

== Gallery ==
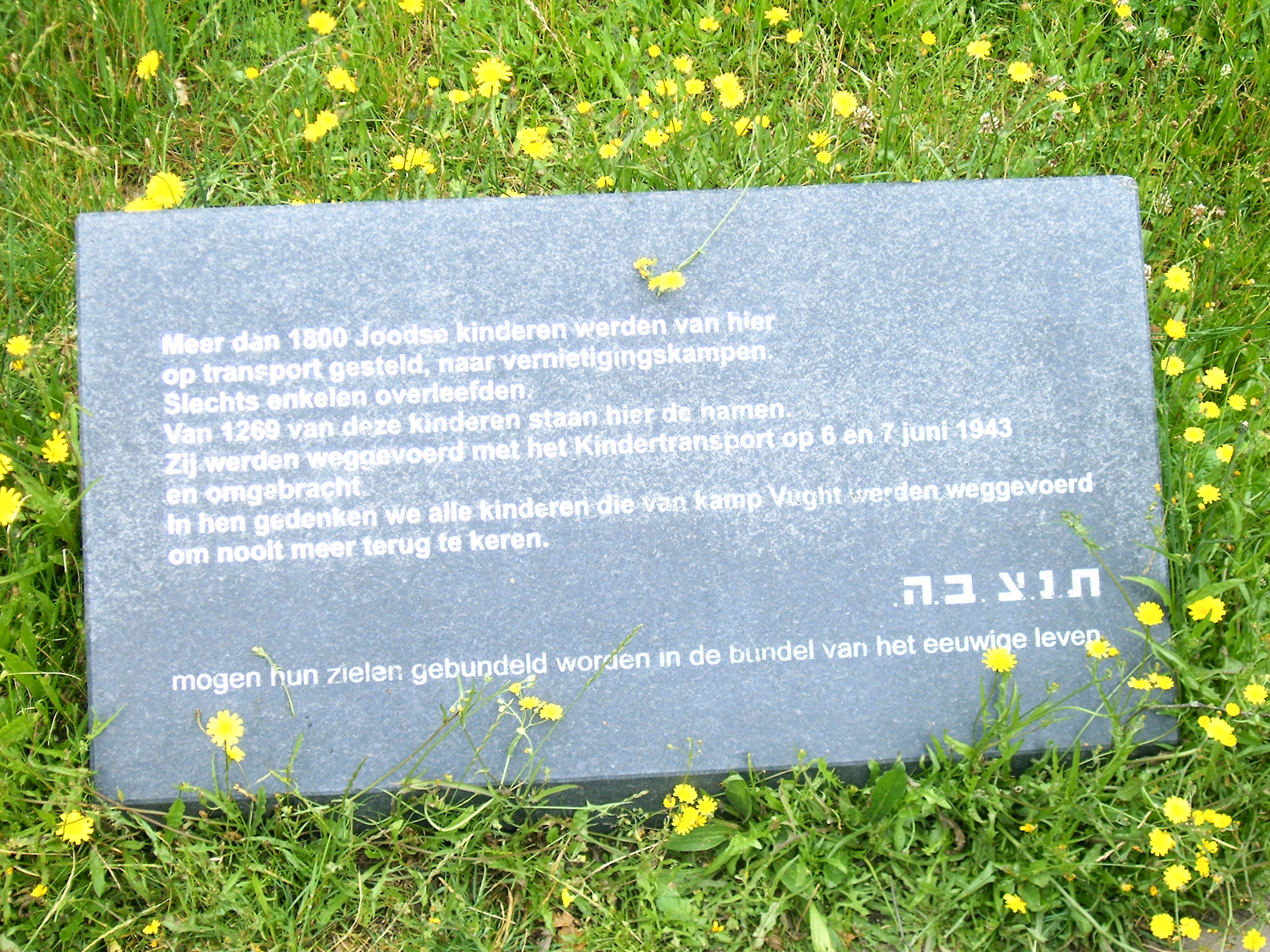

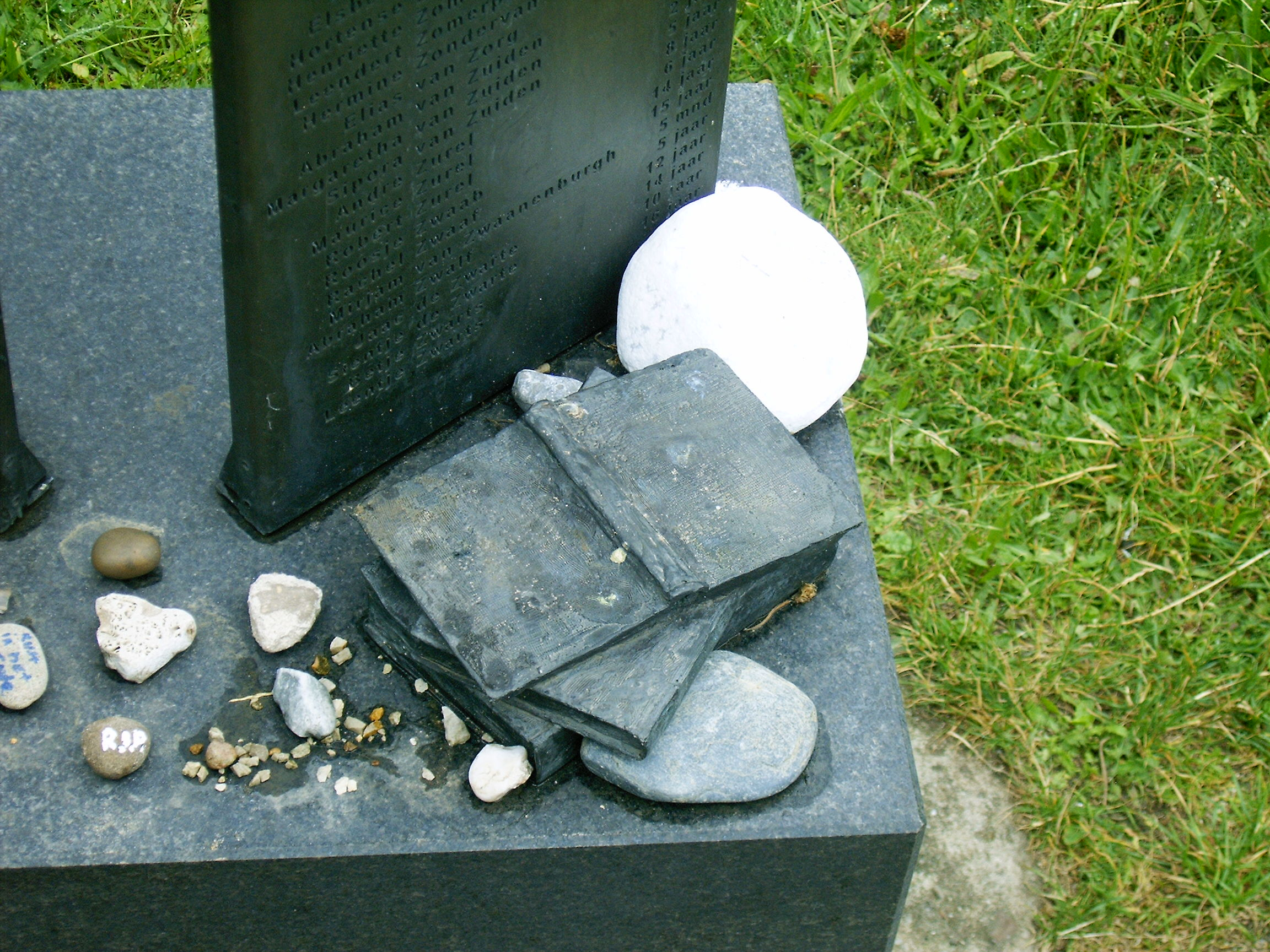

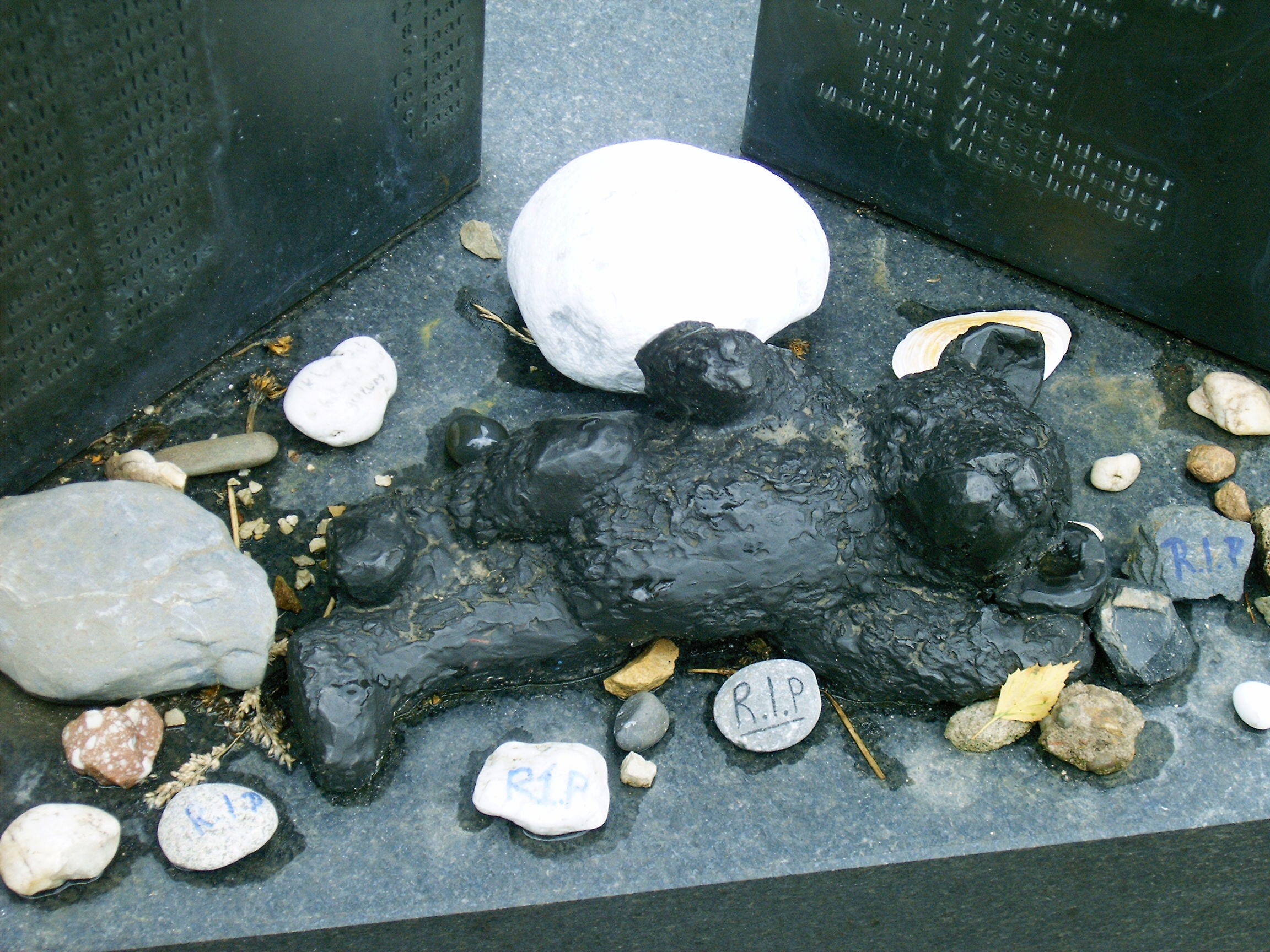

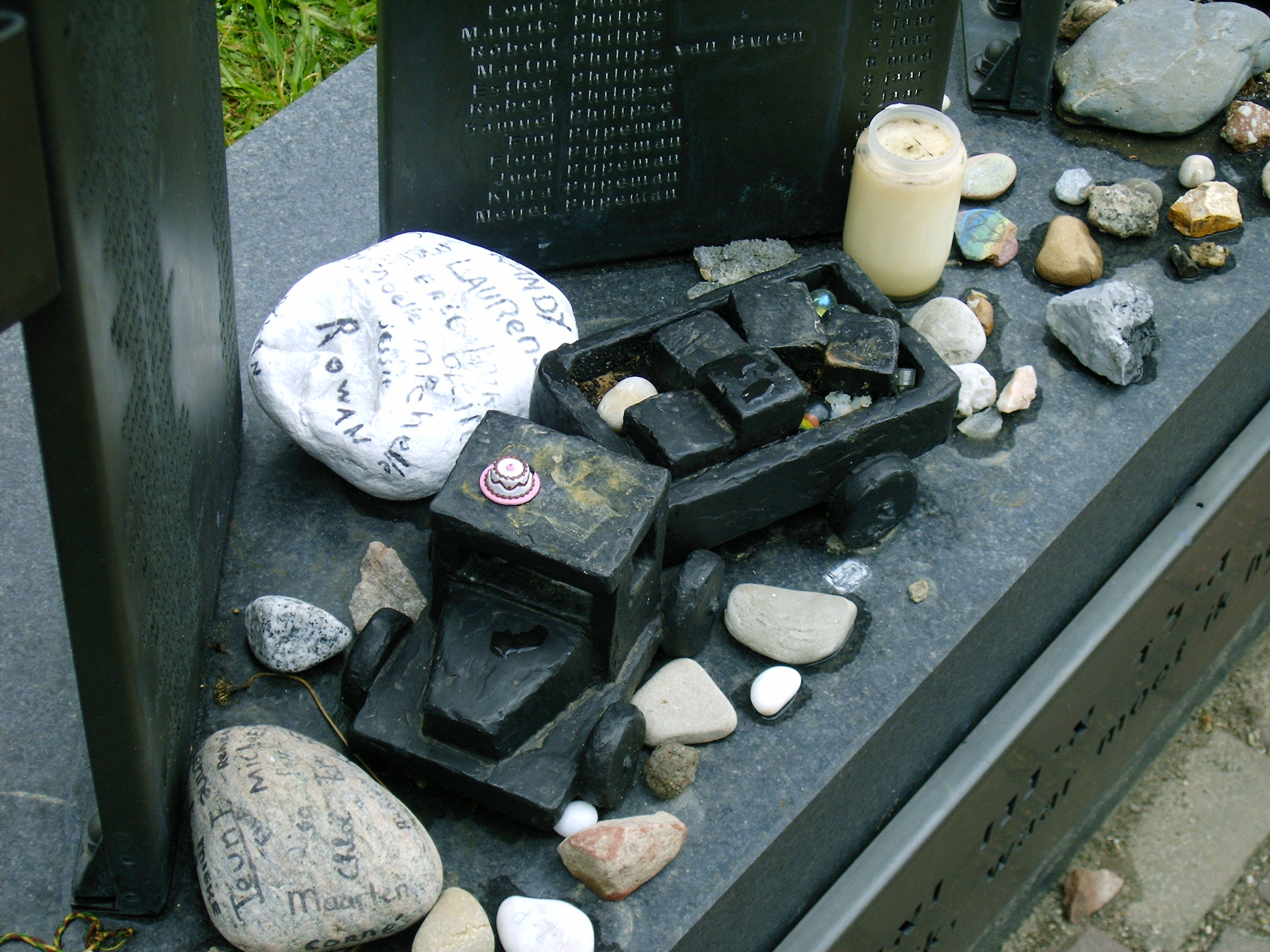

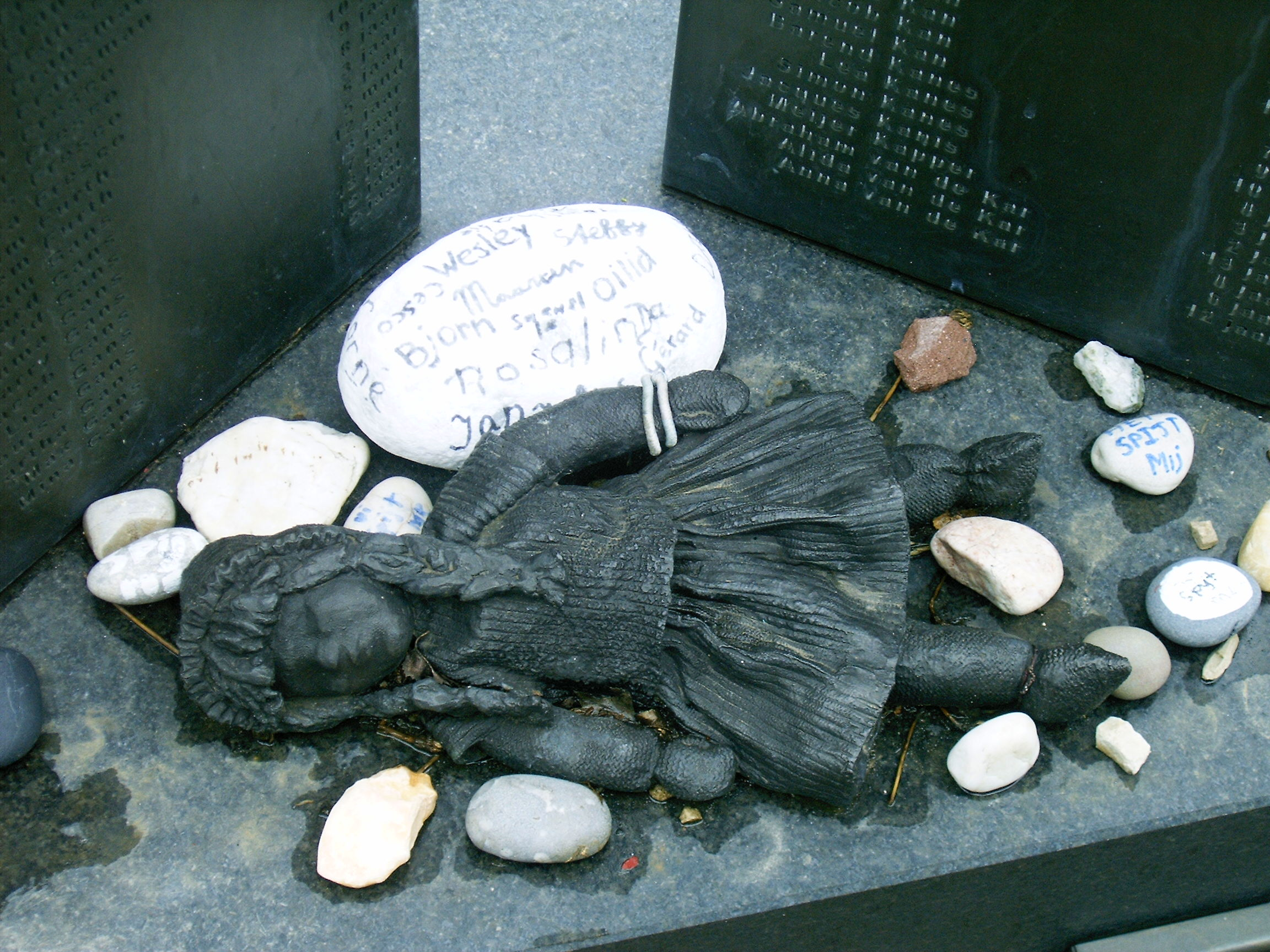

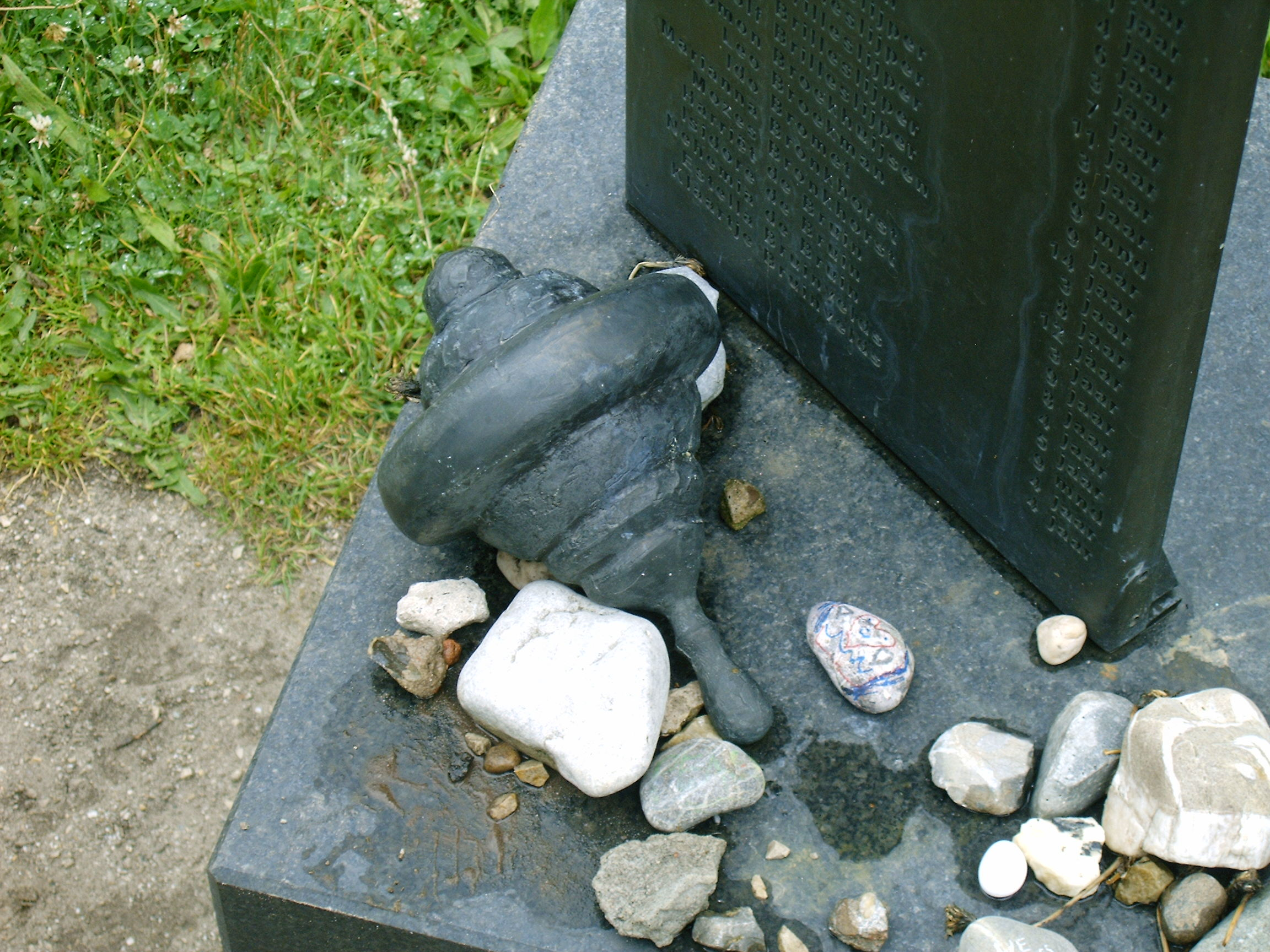

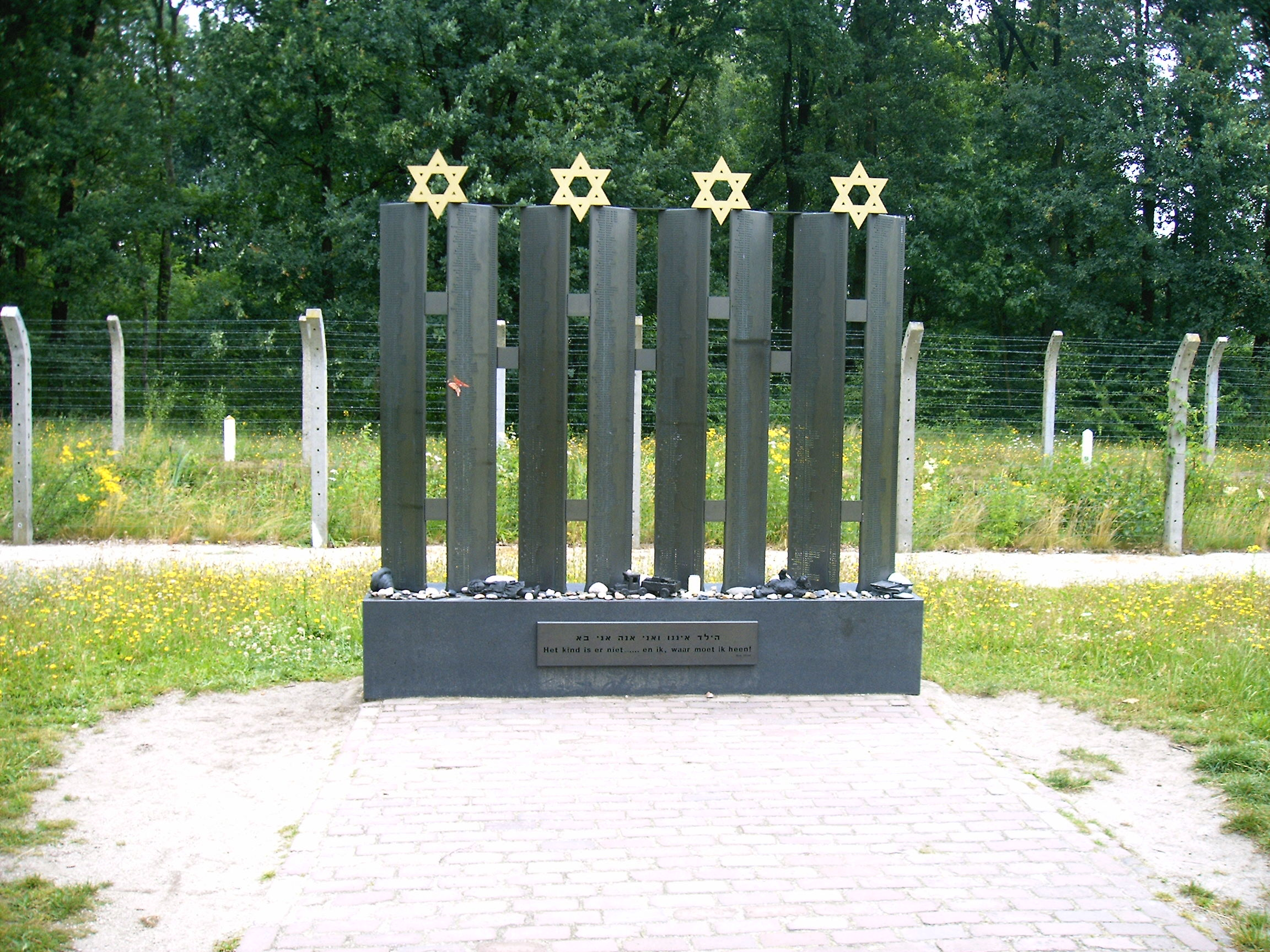

== See also ==
- National Monument Camp Vught
