= National Monument Camp Vught =

Museum in Vught, the Netherlands

Coordinates: 51°39′55.74″N 5°15′32.03″E

- Nationaal Monument Kamp Vught
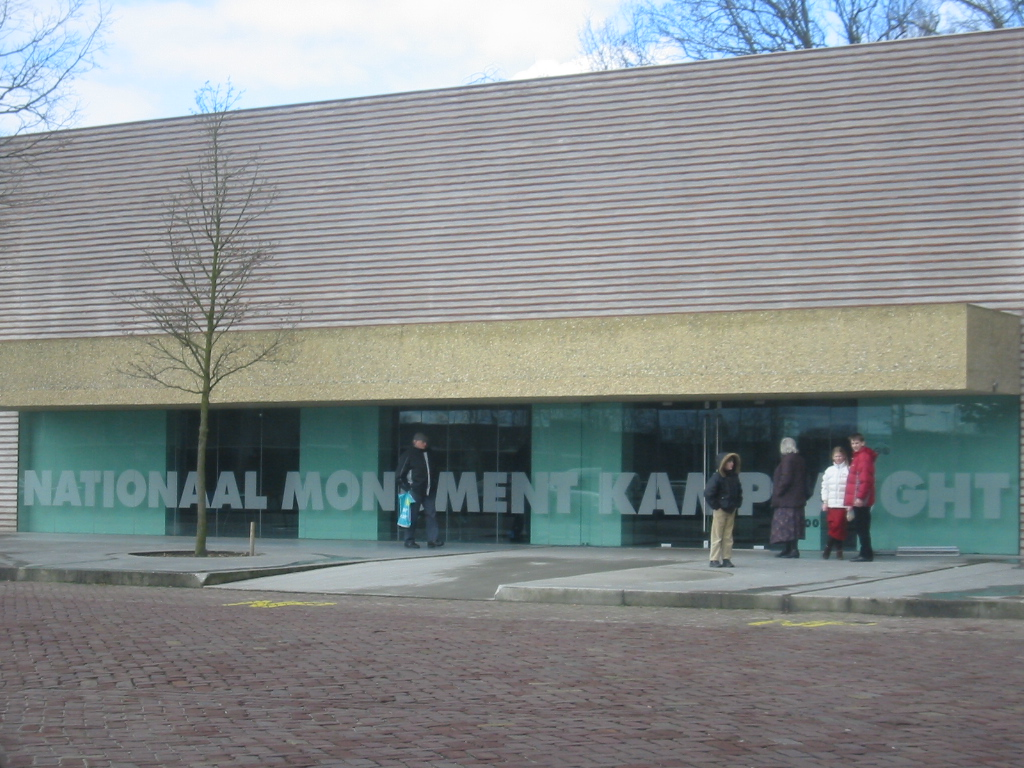
- Established: April 18, 1990
- Location: Lunettenlaan, Vught
- Architect: Claus en Kaan Architecten
- Website: nmkampvught.nl

Video impression of the museum, 2013

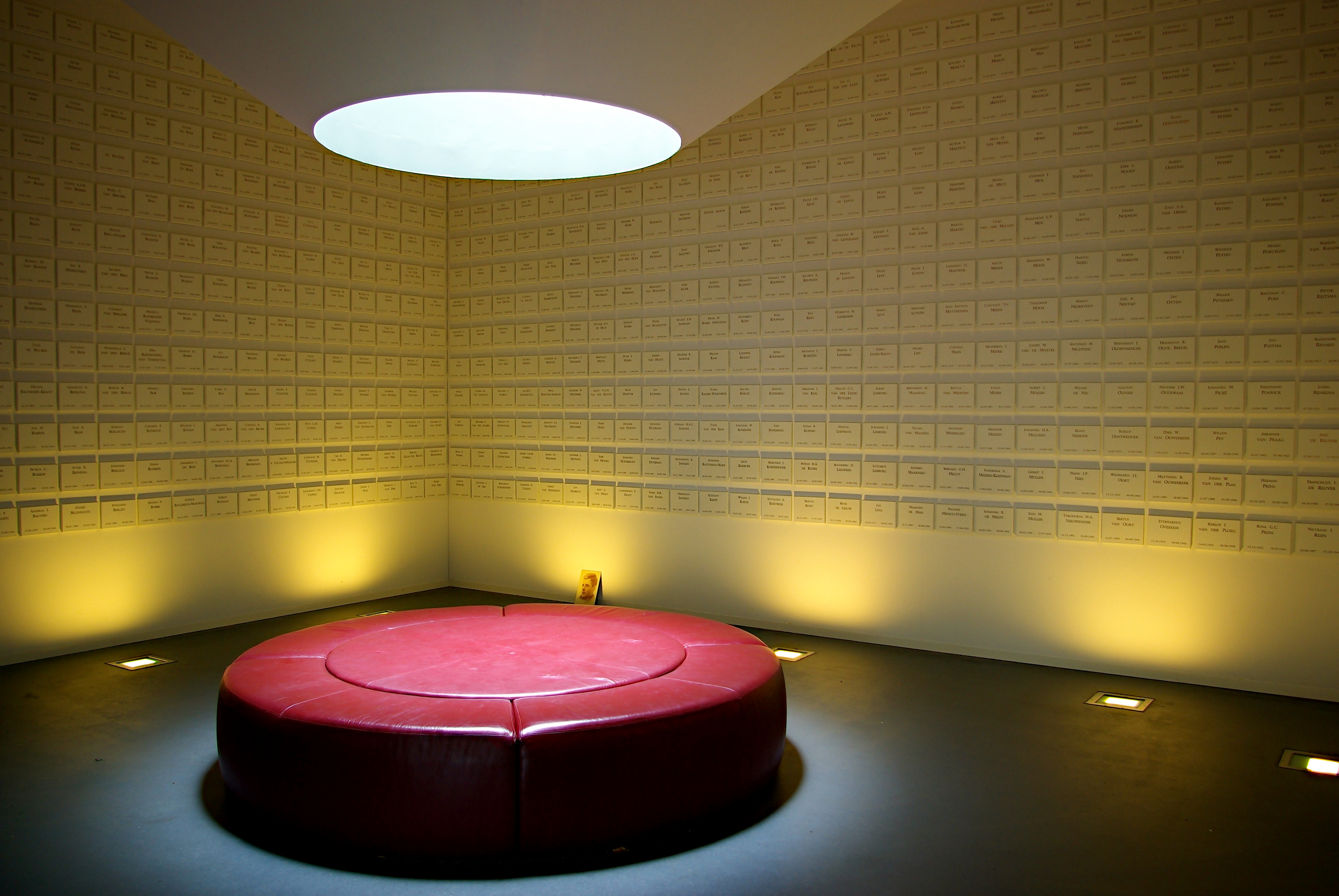
Contemplation room with the names of all the men, women, and children who did not survive their stay in Camp Vught

National Monument Camp Vught is a memorial site with a museum located in Vught, in the Dutch province of North Brabant. It commemorates the concentration camp known as Kamp Vught that was established there during World War II. The memorial was founded in 1990, with an exhibition building added in 2002. The monument is located on the northeastern tip of the former camp grounds.

The initial aim of Kamp Vught was to improve the efficiency of the deportation of Jews from Westerbork by holding Dutch Jews prior to their transport to extermination camps in Germany and Poland. The first prisoners arrived at Vught in January 1943. The camp facilities were liberated on October 26, 1944.

== Outdoor area ==
The outdoor area features a reconstructed half barrack, number 13b, and several reconstructed watchtowers. The watchtowers are lower than the original ones to prevent visibility over the walls of the nearby penitentiary facility located on the former camp grounds.

The former crematorium of the concentration camp is also situated on the outdoor area; it is the only museum element that has not been reconstructed. Within the crematorium, the cell in which the Bunker Tragedy took place has been recreated. At the rear of the building, there is the Monument of the Lost Children to commemorate the children's transports in June 1943 to Sobibor.

== Barrack 1b ==
Barrack 1b is the only remaining original barrack of the concentration camp. It is not located within the monument area but in another part of the former camp, near the (Geniemuseum). During the war, the barrack housed the mail department and a canteen. After being relocated to the Netherlands following the Indonesian National Revolution, Moluccan KNIL soldiers and their families were housed in the camp, and this barrack served as a church space. All other barracks were demolished before 1992. This last barrack fell into disuse in 1996 and deteriorated. It was restored in 2012.

== Photos ==
In March 2021, National Monument Camp Vught acquired three photographs for the first time showing a transport of Jews from Vught station.

== Awards ==
2016 – Friends Lottery Museum Prize

== Gallery ==
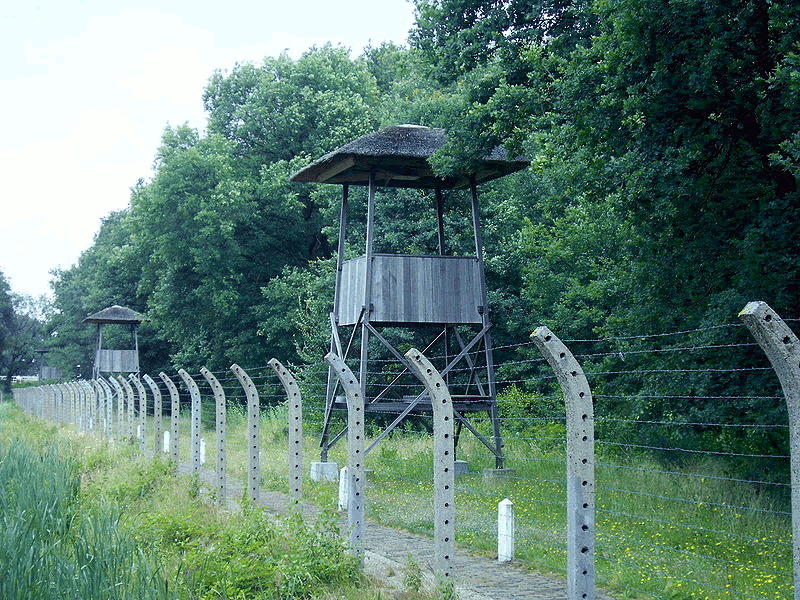
Watchtowers

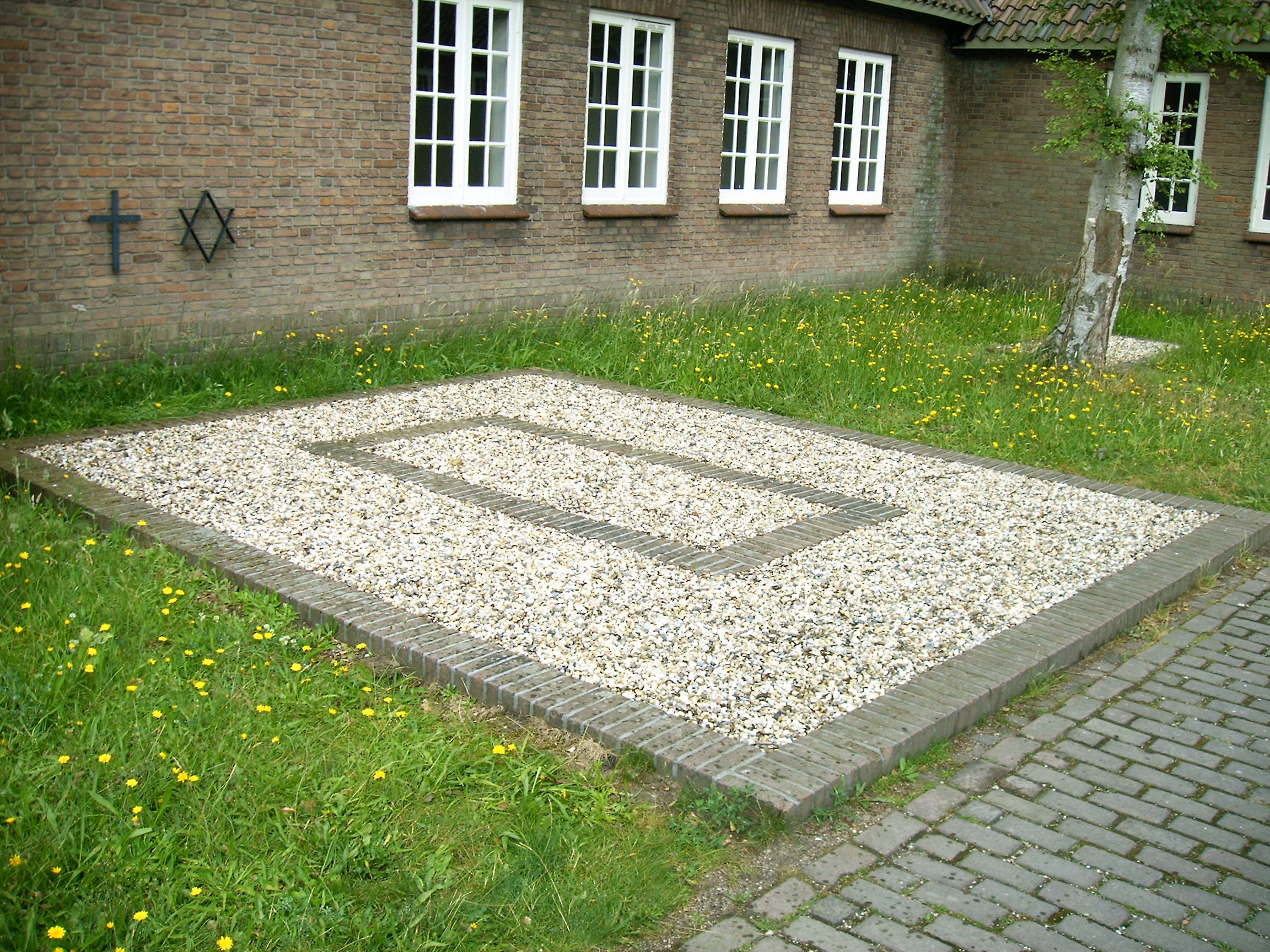
Ash pit near the crematorium

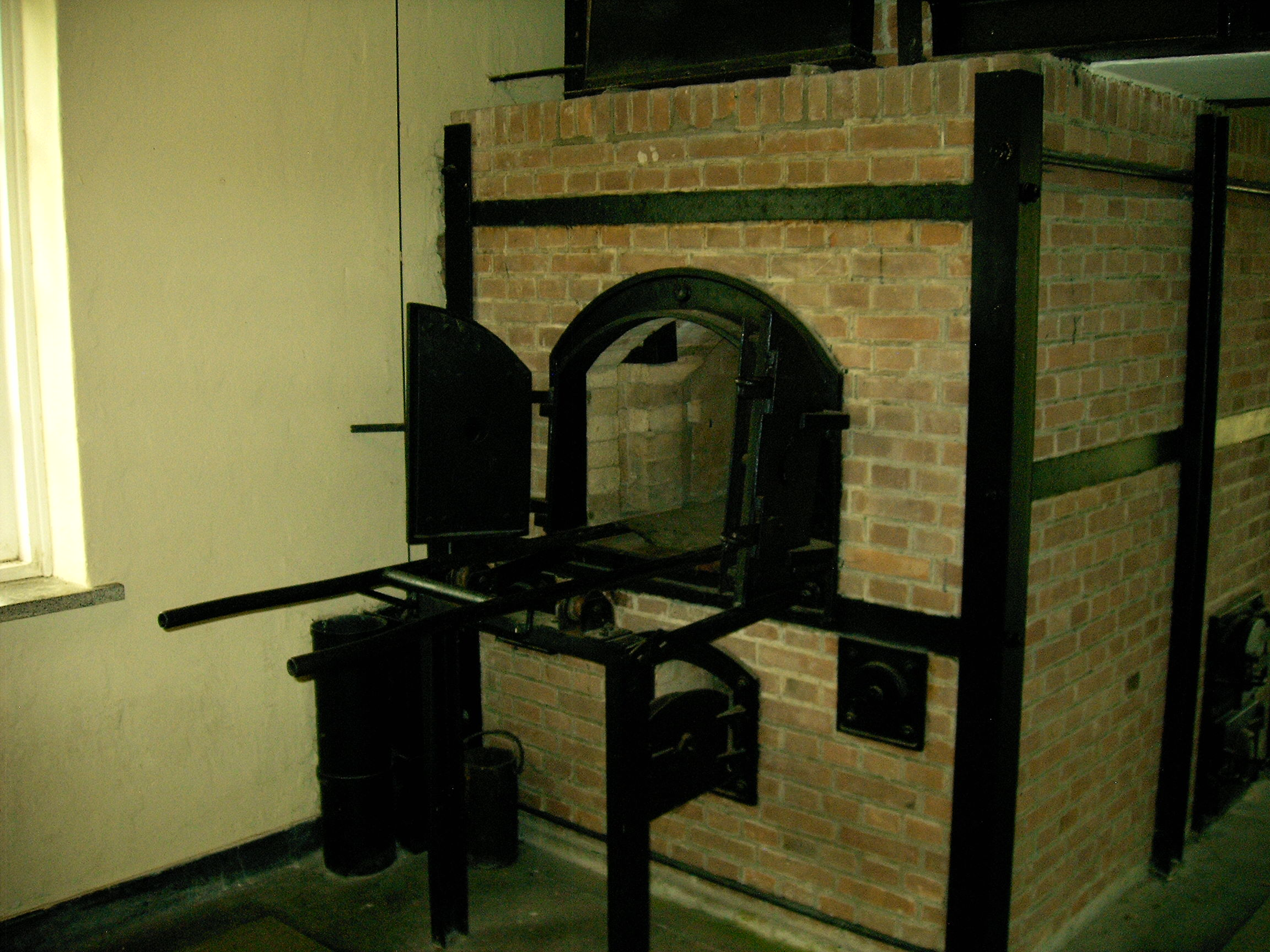
Oven in the crematorium

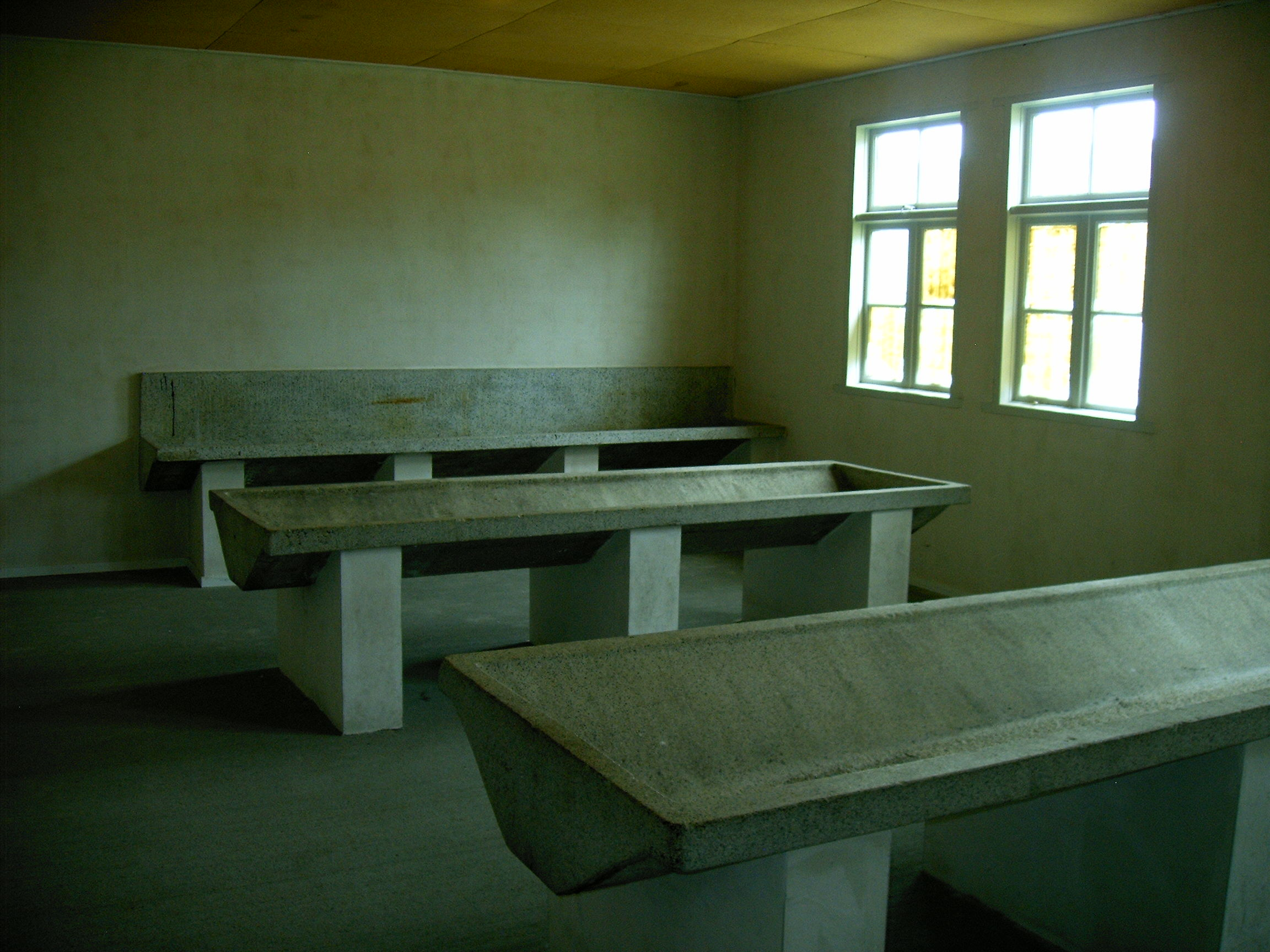
Washing area in the barrack

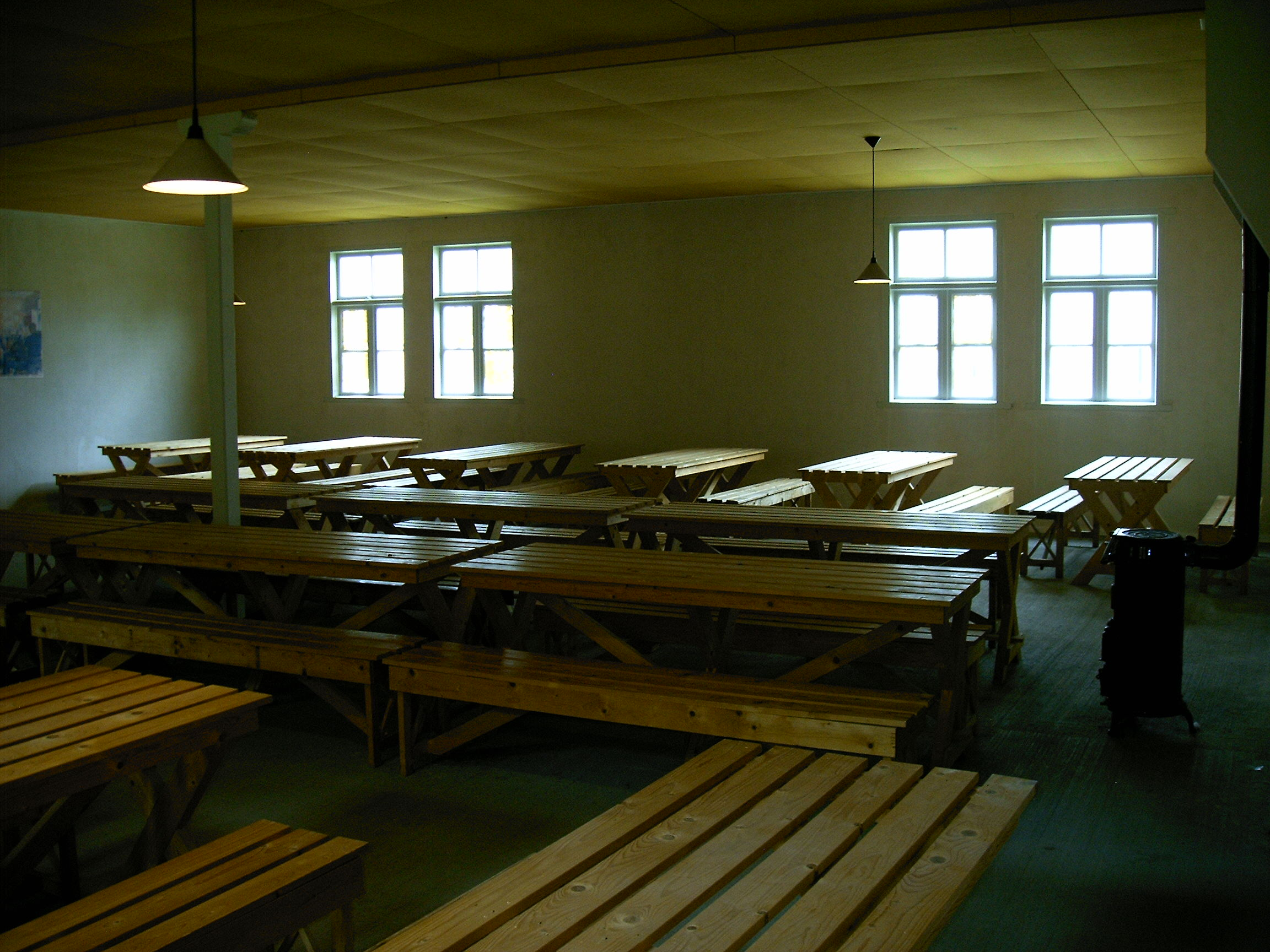
Living area in the barrack

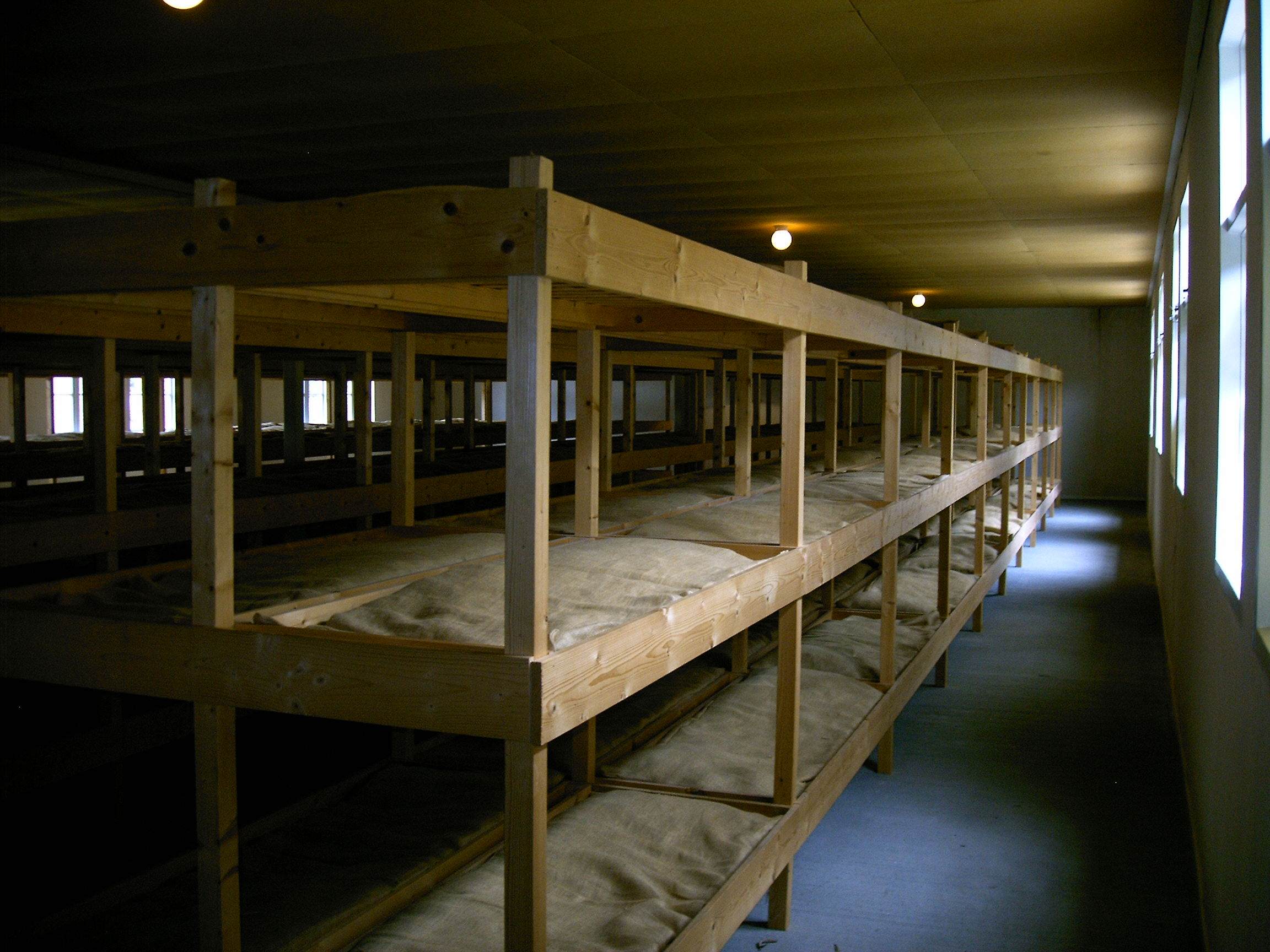
Beds in the barrack

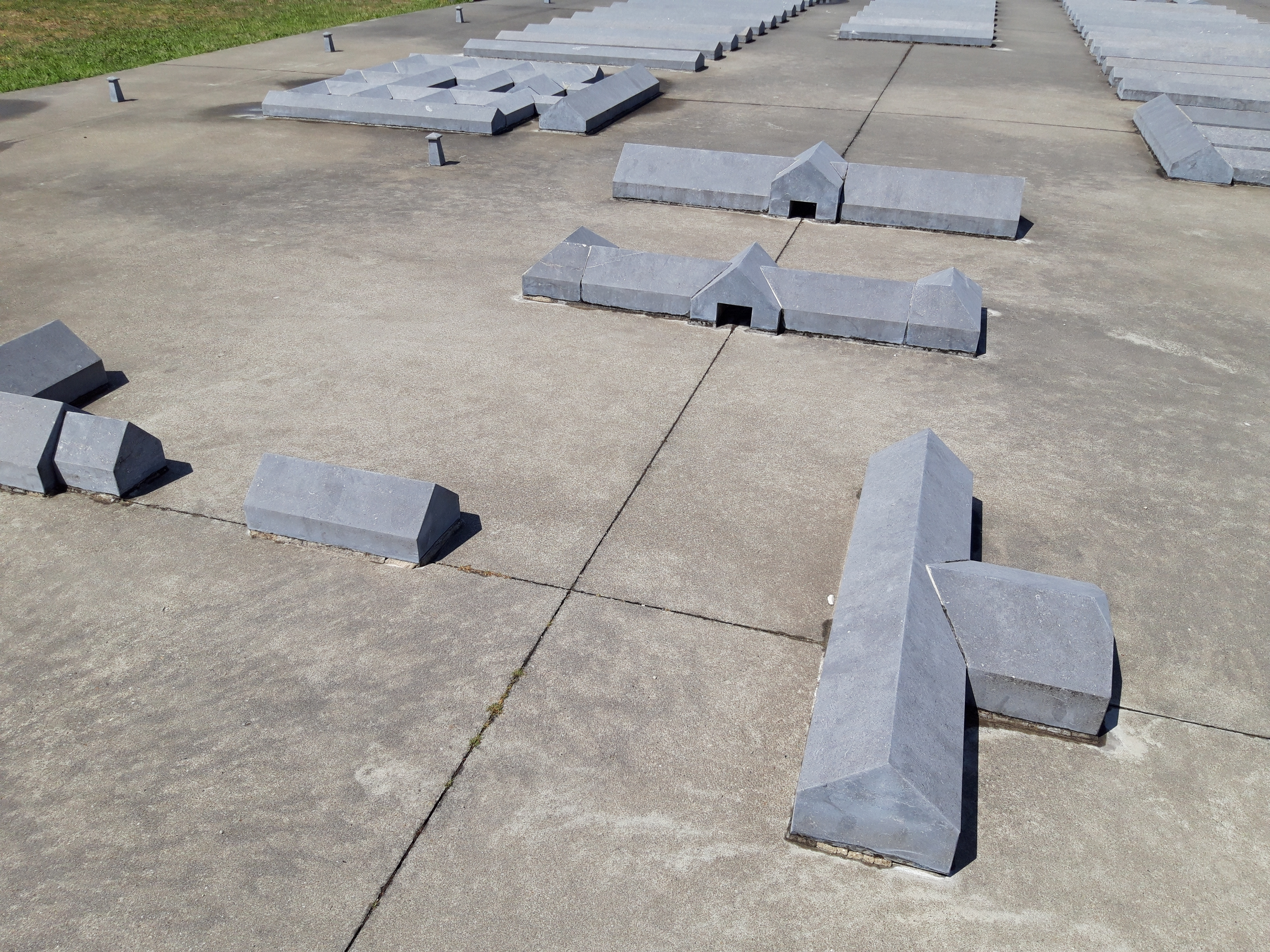
Model of the original complex

== Accessibility ==
The Memorial is connected to the bike network in Netherlands, and the Bus 207 connects the monument with the closest train station at Hertogenbosch (the Vught concentration camp was also named Hertogenbosch Kamp). There are parking spaces in front of the main building. There are also charging stations for cars and e-bikes.

== See also ==
- National Monument (Amsterdam)
- Kamp Erika
- Kamp Schoorl
